= Cornell University Brooks School of Public Policy =

School at Cornell University

Jeb E. Brooks School of Public Policy
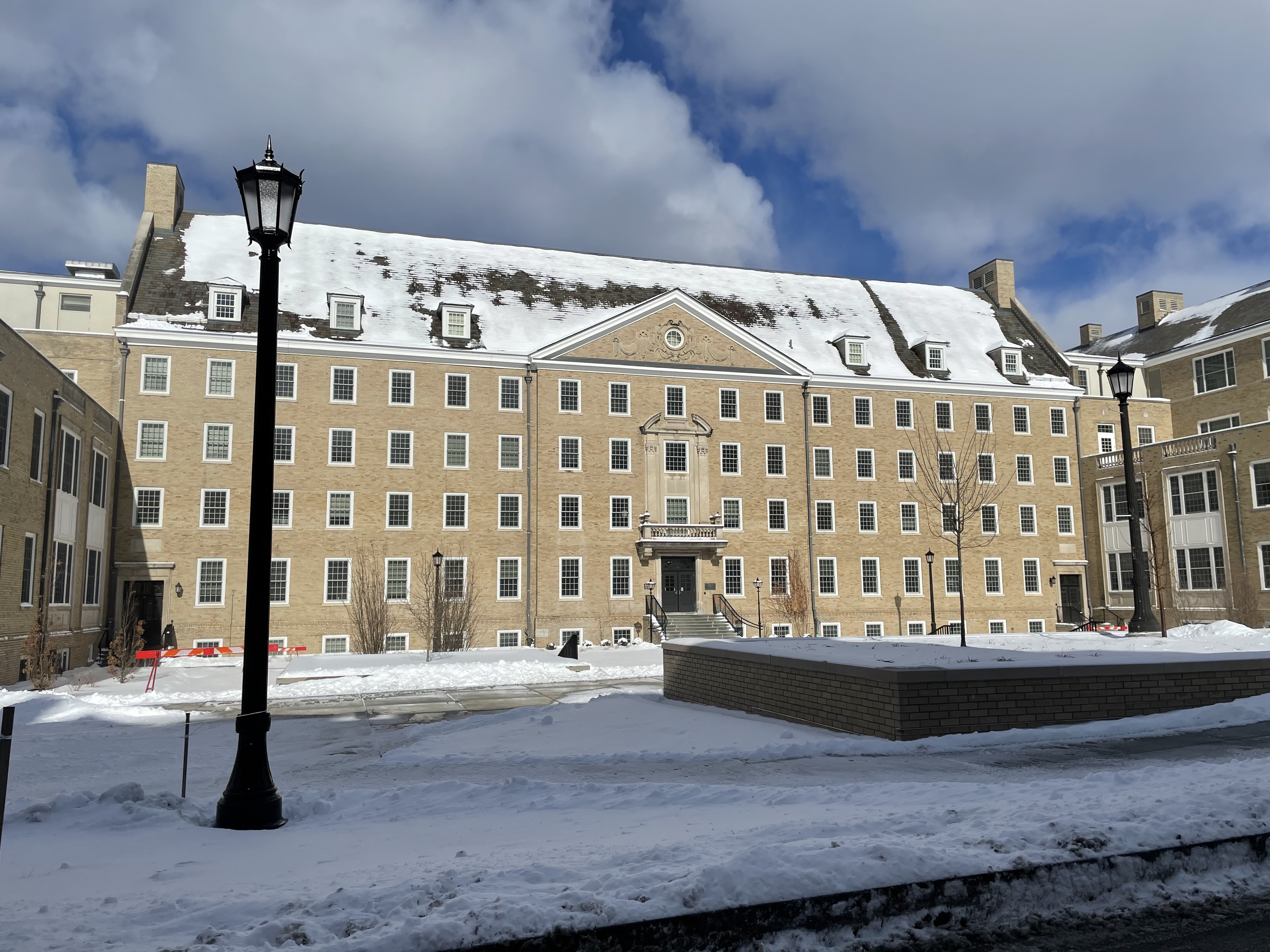
- Martha Van Rensselaer Hall, headquarters for the Cornell Institute for Public Affairs
- Type: Nonprofit hybrid academic unit
- Established: 2021
- Parent institution: Cornell University
- Dean: Colleen Barry
- Postgraduates: 197
- Location: Ithaca, New York, U.S. 42.4492°N 76.478276°W
- Website: publicpolicy.cornell.edu

The Jeb E. Brooks School of Public Policy is the public policy school of Cornell University, in Ithaca, New York. The school was founded in 2021, combining several existing programs at Cornell. Its dean is Colleen Barry.

== History ==
Master in Public Administration (MPA) degrees have been offered at Cornell University since 1946. They were originally offered through the Cornell Institute for Public Affairs. The Sloan Program in Health Administration was established in 1955, awarding Master of Health Administration (MHA) degrees, as part of the Johnson Graduate School of Management.

In fall 2021, the Jeb E. Brooks School of Public Policy was launched at Cornell, combining existing programs, including the MPA and MHA, and launching new ones, including an undergraduate public policy major. The school drew faculty from around the university, including the College of Human Ecology and Department of Government. Colleen Barry was named the school's first dean.

== Academics ==
=== Programs ===
The MPA Program in the Cornell Jeb E. Brooks School of Public Policy offers two options: a residential, two-year Master of Public Administration (MPA) degree, and an 18-month, online Executive Master of Public Administration (EMPA) degree program.

=== Publications ===
MPA and EMPA students produce Cornell Policy Review (CPR), an online academic journal focused on issues surrounding the field of public policy.

=== Rankings ===
According to Foreign Policy's Inside the Ivory Tower rankings of best international relations schools in the world, the school's undergraduate program is 18th, its master's program is 28th, and its PhD program is 13th.

== Notable faculty ==
- Colleen Barry, dean
- Richard Burkhauser, professor emeritus
- Peter K. Enns, professor
- Richard Geddes, professor
- Johannes Haushofer, professor
- Steve Israel, professor of practice
- Sarah Kreps, professor
- Catherine Kling, professor
- Thomas Pepinsky, professor
- Rachel Beatty Riedl, professor
- Laura Tach, professor
- Chantal J.M. Thomas, professor

== See also ==
- List of Ivy League public policy schools
