= List of Ivy League law schools =

This list of Ivy League law schools outlines the five universities of the Ivy League that host a law school. The three Ivy League universities that do not offer law degrees are Brown, Dartmouth and Princeton; they are the smallest universities in the Ivy League by enrollment. All five Ivy League law schools are consistently ranked among the top 14 law schools in the nation or T14.

The Law School at the College of New Jersey formerly existed at Princeton University from 1847 until 1852, officially closing in 1855.

== List ==
School name	Host institution	Image	Degree programs offered	Year founded	LSAT Median
Columbia Law School	Columbia University		J.D., LL.M., S.J.D.	1858	173
Cornell Law School	Cornell University		J.D., LL.M., M.S.L.S., S.J.D.	1887	173
Harvard Law School	Harvard University		J.D., LL.M., S.J.D.	1817	174
University of Pennsylvania Law School	University of Pennsylvania		J.D., LL.M., M.L., LL.C.M., S.J.D.	1850	173
Yale Law School	Yale University		J.D., LL.M., M.S.L., S.J.D., Ph.D.	1824	174

== See also ==
- List of Ivy League public policy schools
- List of Ivy League business schools
- List of Ivy League medical schools
