= List of Ivy League business schools =

Six of the eight Ivy League universities in the Northeastern United States have a business school that offers a Master of Business Administration degree, including Columbia University, Cornell University, Dartmouth College, Harvard University, the University of Pennsylvania, and Yale University. The Cornell SC Johnson College of Business and Wharton School at Pennsylvania also have undergraduate business programs.

== History ==
Although the Ivy League is a college athletic conference, Ivy League also refers to eight private research universities in the Northeastern United States. Six of the eight Ivy League universities have a business school that offers a Master of Business Administration degree, including Columbia University, Cornell University, Dartmouth College, Harvard University, the University of Pennsylvania, and Yale University.

Cappelli, Bonet, and Hamori note, "The Ivy League business schools, associated with higher social class in terms of the income and social status of their students, had a long head start on other MBA programs." The creation of business schools at Ivy League universities occurred over a century ago. Joseph Wharton established the first university-based business school at the Wharton School of the University of Pennsylvania in 1881. In 1900, the Tuck School of Business at Dartmouth College was founded as the world's first graduate school of business. The Harvard Business School became the first business school to offer the MBA degree in 1921. Because there were no textbooks for its new MBA program, Harvard pioneered the case study method of teaching which is still used by business schools today. In 1946, the Johnson School at Cornell became the first Ivy League business school to admit female students, with Jane Stevens ’45, MBA ’48, joining the inaugural class of 41 students in the Graduate School of Business and Public Administration (which later became the Johnson Graduate School of Management), graduating in 1948 as the first woman to earn a Cornell MBA.

In 1955, five Ivy League schools—Columbia, Cornell, Dartmouth, Harvard, and Pennsylvania—offered MBA degrees. These five business schools collectively graduated half of the MBA degrees awarded in the United States that year. Also in 1955, Wharton became the first Ivy League business school to admit female students at the undergraduate level. Yale added its MBA program in 1976. In 1990, Cornell Johnson invented the immersion learning method, creating a second semester curriculum bespoke to distinct, highly specialized industries to emulate real world working conditions prior to the summer internship. Today, all top business schools across the United States implement some form of experiential or immersive learning practicum into their curriculum.

By 2001, Ivy League MBA graduates constituted only five percent of all MBA degrees awarded in the United States but represented over 23 percent of the MBA qualifications held by top executives at Fortune 100 companies. In 2021, Ivy League business schools provided 3,680 MBA graduates, representing only 3.6% of the total MBAs awarded. However, the preference for Ivy League MBA graduates has increased, according to Cappelli, Bonet, and Hamori.

As of 2022, all of the Ivy League MBA programs are ranked in the top fifteen of US colleges by U.S. News & World Report. Forbes ranks the six programs in its top eleven. Of the Ivy League business schools, the Tuck School MBA program accepts the highest percentage of candidates, with an acceptance rate of 33 percent as of the 2023–24 academic year. Harvard and Columbia have the lowest acceptance rates, at 9.2 percent and 13.6 percent, respectively.

== Cost and outcomes ==
The average cost of an Ivy League MBA is $100,000 a year, with tuition averaging $78,000 a year as of 2022. BestColleges notes that despite the high tuition rates at Ivy League business schools, graduates from these programs have access to alumni and industry connections that can lead to middle management positions with high salaries. Ivy League MBA graduates from the class of 2021 had a median postgraduate base salary of $150,000 a year.

== Ivy League business schools ==
Six of the eight Ivy League universities have a business school that offers a Master of Business Administration degree. Of these six, only Johnson School at Cornell and Wharton School at Pennsylvania offer undergraduate business programs. The two remaining Ivy League schools, Brown University and Princeton University, lack both a graduate and undergraduate business program. However, Princeton does have Master of Finance degree and Brown offers a joint Executive MBA degree with IE Business School in Spain.

School name	Host institution	Year founded	Location	Image	Degrees offered	References
Columbia Business School	Columbia University	1916	New York City, New York		MPhil, MS, MBA, EMBA, PhD	
Harvard Business School	Harvard University	1908	Allston, Massachusetts		MBA, PhD, DBA	
Cornell SC Johnson College of Business	Cornell University	1909	Ithaca, New York		BS, MS, MPS, MBA, EMBA, PhD	
Tuck School of Business	Dartmouth College	1900	Hanover, New Hampshire		MBA	
Wharton School	University of Pennsylvania	1881	Philadelphia, Pennsylvania		BS, MBA, EMBA, PhD	
Yale School of Management	Yale University	1976	New Haven, Connecticut		MBA, EMBA, PhD	

== See also ==
- List of Ivy League law schools
- List of Ivy League public policy schools
- List of Ivy League medical schools
- List of United States graduate business school rankings
