= List of Ivy League public policy schools =

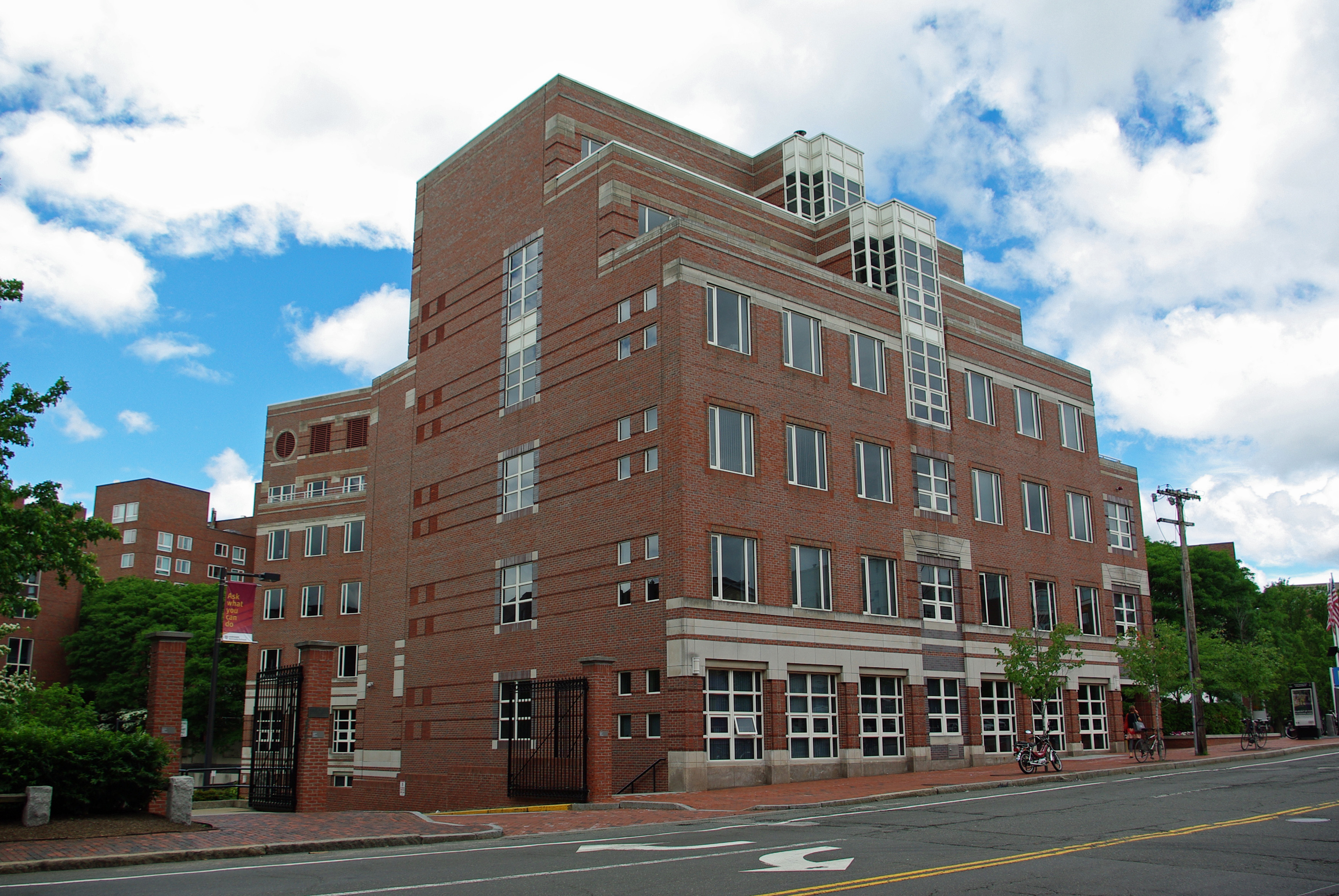
The John F. Kennedy School of Government is Harvard's school of government and international affairs.

The Ivy League public policy schools outlines the universities within the Ivy League that offer public policy or public administration degrees. These public policy schools often provide Bachelor of Arts (BA), Master of Public Policy (MPP), Master of Public Administration (MPA), Master of International Affairs, or Doctor of Philosophy in Public Policy and/or Administration degrees. The public policy programs at the Ivy League rank as some of the best in the world.

Many schools allow students to specialize in certain policy areas. Depending on the university's specialty, these fields may include domestic policy, foreign policy, health policy, urban policy, economic policy, international affairs, security studies, and more. Students who graduate these programs often work in various branches of government or at NGOs. Some graduates go on to work in the private sector or academia.

== History ==
The oldest program for the study of public policy and administration began at Princeton University in 1930, founded as the School of Public and International Affairs. The school's mission was to prepare students for "leadership in public and international affairs" in accordance with President Woodrow Wilson who desired a school that could train students for public service. Harvard University soon followed with their own school, the Graduate School of Public Administration, in 1936.

The most recently established school of government was at Yale University through the Jackson Institute for Global Affairs in 2010. The goal of the Jackson Institute was to enhance the university's current offerings of social science research and courses. The Institute currently specializes in international affairs, but is planning to expand to domestic policy in the near future.

== List ==
School name	Parent institution	Location	Image	Degree programs offered	Year founded
Princeton School of Public and International Affairs	Princeton University	Princeton, NJ		AB, MPA, MPP, PhD	1930
Harvard Kennedy School	Harvard University	Cambridge, MA		MPA, MPP, PhD	1936
Fels Institute of Government	University of Pennsylvania	Philadelphia, PA		MPA	1937
School of International and Public Affairs (SIPA)	Columbia University	New York, NY		MPA, MIA, PhD	1946
Jeb E. Brooks School of Public Policy	Cornell University	Ithaca, NY		BS, MPA/E-MPA, MHA/E-MHA, PhD	2021
Watson School of International and Public Affairs	Brown University	Providence, RI		BA, MPA, MPP	1979
Nelson A. Rockefeller Center for Public Policy and the Social Sciences	Dartmouth College	Hanover, NH		Undergraduate minor	1983
Yale Jackson School of Global Affairs	Yale University	New Haven, CT		BA, MA, MAS	2010

== Impact ==
These schools have served as the model for other programs around the world, most notably at Oxford University. The Blavatnik School of Government was founded in 2010 and is the first of its kind in Europe. It currently offers MPP and DPhil in Public Policy degrees. Pundits believe the Blavatnik School seeks to differentiate itself with a more well-rounded curriculum, thereby competing with the American monopoly on public policy schools.

== Rankings ==
Based on the volume of global leaders produced, research output, and brand recognition, Harvard's Kennedy School ranks as No. 1 out of all policy schools, followed by Princeton’s SPIA and Columbia's SIPA. Based on number of publications, the Kennedy School also ranks No. 1, followed again by SPIA and SIPA.

The Ivy League's international relations programs are ranked in Foreign Policy's "Best International Relations Schools in the World" article. The rankings provide a glimpse of international relations as an academic and professional discipline, aggregating responses from 1,514 international relations scholars at U.S. colleges and universities around the country.

University	School name	Foreign Policy undergraduate rankings	Foreign Policy master's rankings	Foreign Policy PhD rankings
University of Pennsylvania	Fels Institute of Government	19	N/A	27
Columbia University	School of International and Public Affairs	5	5	4
Princeton University	Princeton School of Public and International Affairs	2	4	4
Harvard University	John F. Kennedy School of Government	1	2	1
Dartmouth College	Nelson A. Rockefeller Center for Public Policy and the Social Sciences	12	N/A	N/A
Yale University	Jackson Institute for Global Affairs	6	13	6
Cornell University	Jeb E. Brooks School of Public Policy	18	28	13
Brown University	Watson School of International and Public Affairs	22	N/A	28

== See also ==
- Public policy school
- List of Ivy League law schools
- List of Ivy League business schools
- List of Ivy League medical schools
- Johns Hopkins University's School of Advanced International Studies
- Tufts University's Fletcher School of Law and Diplomacy
- Oxford University's Blavatnik School of Government
