= Political polarization in the United States =

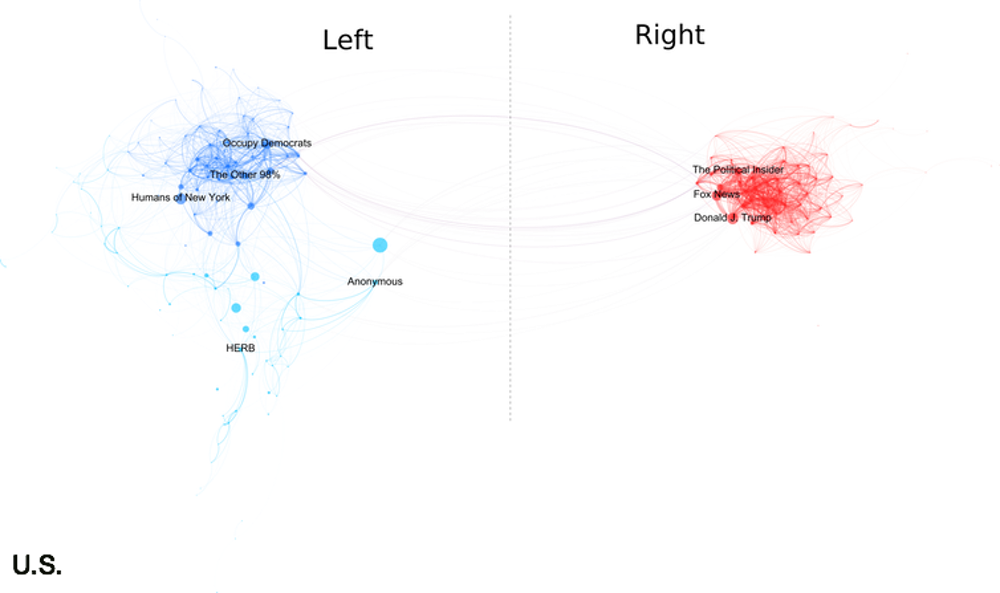
One year after the 2016 United States presidential election, American Facebook users on the political right and political left shared almost no common interests.

Political polarization is a prominent component of politics in the United States. Scholars distinguish between ideological polarization (differences between the policy positions) and affective polarization (a dislike and distrust of political out-groups), both of which are apparent in the United States. In the late 20th and early 21st century, the U.S. has experienced a greater surge in ideological polarization and affective polarization than comparable democracies.

Differences in political ideals and policy goals are indicative of a healthy democracy. Scholarly questions consider changes in the magnitude of political polarization over time, the extent to which polarization is a feature of American politics and society, and whether there has been a shift away from focusing on triumphs to dominating the perceived abhorrent supporters of the opposing party.

Polarization among U.S. legislators is asymmetric, as it has primarily been driven by a rightward shift among Republicans in Congress. Polarization has increased since the 1970s, with rapid increases in polarization during the 2000s onwards. According to the Pew Research Center, members of both parties who have unfavorable opinions of the opposing party doubled between 1994 and 2014, while those who have very unfavorable opinions of the opposing party are at record highs as of 2022.

== Definition and conceptualization ==
The Pew Research Center defines political polarization in the United States as "the vast and growing gap between liberals and conservatives, Republicans and Democrats". According to psychology professors Gordon Heltzel and Kristin Laurin, political polarization occurs when "subsets of a population adopt increasingly dissimilar attitudes toward parties and party members (i.e., affective polarization), as well as ideologies and policies (ideological polarization.)" Polarization has been defined as both a process and a state of being. A defining aspect of polarization, though not its only facet, is a bimodal distribution around conflicting points of view or philosophies. In general, defining a threshold at which an issue is "polarized" is imprecise; detecting the trend of polarization, however, (increasing, decreasing, or stable) is more straightforward.

The relationship between ideological and affective polarization is complicated and contested but, generally speaking, scholars recognize an increase in both ideological and affective polarization in the United States over time. Some research suggests that affective polarization is growing more rapidly than ideological polarization and perhaps even driving it. Political scientists debate the relationship between elite-driven polarization and mass polarization (among the general public). Morris Fiorina argues that the American public is not as polarized as is often assumed, suggesting that elite polarization is wrongly imputed to the general public. Conversely, Alan Abramowitz argues that mass polarization is actually imposing polarization upon elites through the electoral process.

Affective polarization is closely related to political tribalism and "us-them" thinking. There is mounting psychological evidence that humans are hardwired to display loyalty towards in-groups and hostility and distrust towards out-groups, however they are defined. One way to describe this is to say that humans evolved to be partial empathizers, ready to empathize with those from whom they can expect reciprocity, while being incredibly skeptical towards outsiders. Recent research has shown that the interplay between out-group hostility and in-group empathy can be the driver of ideological polarization. Many of our cognitive biases and failures of reason can be traced directly back to our apparent need to defend our group against threats, even when those threats consist mainly of ideas and words. Motivated reasoning and confirmation bias (or myside bias) help to explain the cognitive blindspots that lead us to dismiss or discredit challenging information while granting unwarranted credence to information that supports our pre-existing views.

For example, in one study, subjects were asked to evaluate "neutral" quantitative data regarding the efficacy of skin cream. In this treatment, subjects' performance was determined simply by their numeracy, that is, their mathematical skill level. In a second treatment, subjects were presented with data concerning the efficacy of gun control laws. Partisans performed much more poorly when asked to evaluate data that challenged their pre-existing views about gun control laws. High mathematical skill levels did not prevent this. Those who had the strongest mathematical skills were best able to rationalize a false interpretation of the data that conformed with their pre-existing views.

Similarly, Americans' views on gun control seem to stem almost entirely from their cultural worldview and how they position themselves in that cultural schema. Statistics do not persuade them to change their minds. Cognitive scientists Mercier and Sperber argue that human reason did not evolve in order to produce logical arguments, but rather to finesse social relationships. Within this view, the evolutionary purpose of reason is not truth, but persuasion and collaboration. These studies suggest that our social and partisan identities, often discussed in the context of identity politics, affect the ways in which we engage information, and may sometimes drive political polarization.

Sociologist Daniel DellaPosta introduced the concept of "pluralistic collapse" in a 2020 paper in the American Sociological Review. DellaPosta proposed that polarization was not merely a matter of people moving further apart on issues they already disagreed about. Instead, social, cultural, and political alignments have come to encompass an increasingly diverse array of opinions and attitudes. Analyzing 44 years of data from the General Social Survey, DellaPosta concluded that mass polarization had increased through a process of "belief consolidation," the collapse of previously cross-partisan alignments. Consequently, where citizens once held idiosyncratic combinations of views that cut across partisan lines, they now increasingly sort into two comprehensive worldview clusters. He likened the division to an oil spill: "...it's not just that the previously existing division is getting stronger, it's that other opinions that weren't even part of those division[s] to begin with are getting drawn in."

Although most studies have focused on survey data to quantify affective polarization, social media and social network based approaches have recently been proposed to estimate the affective polarization.

== History ==
=== Gilded Age ===
The Gilded Age of the late 19th century (c. 1870 – 1900) is considered to be one of the most politically polarized periods in American history, with open political violence and highly polarized political discourse. A key event during this era was the election of 1896, which some scholars say led to an era of one-party rule, created "safe seats" for elected officials to build careers as politicians, increased party homogeneity, and increased party polarization. Political polarization was overall heightened, with Republicans strengthening their hold on industrial areas, and Democrats losing ground in the North and upper Midwest.

=== 1950s and 1960s ===
The 1950s and 1960s were marked by high levels of political bipartisanship, the results of a post-World War II "consensus" in American politics, as well as ideological diversity within each of the two major parties.

=== 1990–present ===
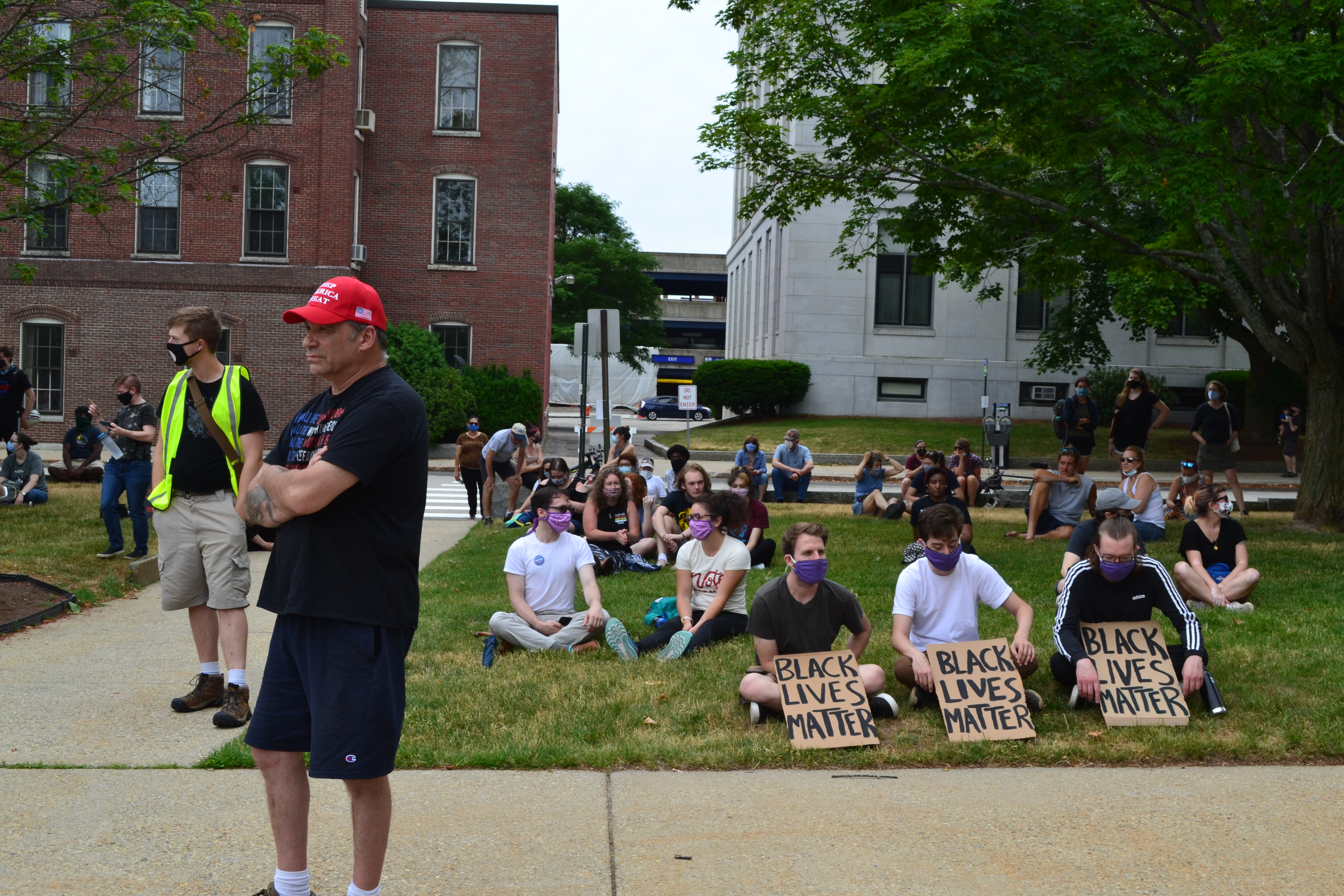
A crowd of protesters at a 2020 Black Lives Matter Rally, including an unimpressed man in a Make America Great Again hat. Political polarization during and after 2020 has been the subject of much scholarly debate.

In the 1990s, House Speaker Newt Gingrich's use of "asymmetric constitutional hardball" led to increasing polarization in American politics driven primarily by the Republican Party. Media and political figures began espousing the narrative of polarization in the early 1990s, with a notable example being Pat Buchanan's speech at the 1992 Republican National Convention. In the speech, he declared a culture war for the future of the country.

In 1994, the Democratic Party lost control of the House of Representatives for the first time in forty years. Congress went Republican for the first time since 1952. The narrative of political polarization became a recurring theme in the elections of 2000 and 2004. After President George W. Bush barely won reelection in 2004, English historian Simon Schama noted that the US had not been so polarized since the American Civil War, and that a more apt name might be the Divided States of America.

From 1994 to 2014, the share of Americans who expressed either "consistently liberal" or "consistently conservative" opinions doubled from 10% to 21%. In 1994, the average Republican was more conservative than 70% of Democrats, compared to more conservative than 94% of Democrats in 2014. The average Democrat went from more liberal than 64% of Republicans to more liberal than 92% of Republicans during the same era. In contrast, families are becoming more politically homogenous. As of 2018, 80% of marriages had spousal alignment on party affiliation. Parent-child agreement was 75%. Both of these represent significant increases from family homogeneity in the 1960s. A 2022 study found that there had been a substantial increase since 1980 in political polarization among adolescents, driven by parental influence.

A Brown University study released in 2020 found that the U.S. was polarizing faster compared to other democratic countries such as Canada, the United Kingdom, Germany, and Australia. According to Stony Brook University political scientists Yanna Krupnikov and John Barry Ryan, polarization in American politics is primarily a phenomenon among Americans who are deeply involved in politics and very expressive about their political views. Americans who are not as involved in politics are not as polarized.

Other research suggests that Americans are less polarized than they think, and that there is "significant ideological overlap and agreement on policies." Ideological polarization is felt most strongly among those who are the most politically engaged, such as progressive activists and extreme conservatives. Although Americans are less ideologically polarized than they believe, they are very emotionally polarized (also known as affective polarization). In other words, "they do not like members of the other party."

According to Gallup, in 2025 the percentage of Americans self-identifying as politically moderate reached a record low of 34%. Among Republicans, 77% self-identified as conservative, 18% as moderate, and 4% as liberal. Among Democrats, 55% self-identified as liberal, 34% as moderate, and 9% as conservative. In 2025, The Wall Street Journal described the American political system as having "a total breakdown in trust" between the two parties and among the general public.

== Politically polarizing issues ==
In February 2020, a Pew Research Center study highlighted the current political issues that have the most partisanship. By far, addressing climate change was the most partisan issue with only 21% of Republicans considering it a top policy priority as opposed to 78% of Democrats. Issues that are also extremely partisan include protecting the environment, reforming gun policy, and bolstering the country's military strength. These differences in policy priorities emerge as both Democrats and Republicans shift their focus away from improving the economy.

Since 2011, both parties have gradually placed economic stimulation and job growth lower on their priority list, with Democrats experiencing a sharper decline of importance when compared to Republicans. This is in stark contrast to the 1990s, when both Democrats and Republicans shared similar views on climate change and showed significantly more agreement.

A 2017 Gallup poll identified issues where the partisan gap has significantly increased over a period of about fifteen years. For Republicans, the most significant shift was the idea that the "federal government has too much power", with 39% of Republicans agreeing with that notion in 2002 as opposed to 82% agreeing in 2016. On the Democratic side, the largest shift was increasing favorability towards Cuba, changing from 32% in 2002 to 66% in 2017. Ultimately, as partisanship continues to permeate and dominate policy, citizens who adhere and align themselves with political parties become increasingly polarized.

On some issues with a wide public consensus, partisan politics still divides citizens. For instance, in 2018, even though 60% of Americans believed that the government should provide healthcare for its citizens, opinions were split among party lines with 85% of Democrats, including left-leaning independents, believing that healthcare is the government's responsibility and 68% of Republicans believing that it is not the government's responsibility. Likewise, on some prominent issues where the parties are broadly split, there is bipartisan support for specific policies. In 2020, for example, in health care, 79% of Americans think pre-existing conditions should be covered by health insurance; 60% think abortion should be broadly legal in the first trimester but only 28% in the second trimester and 13% in the third trimester.

In 2020, 77% of Americans thought legal immigration is good for the country. In 2019, on gun rights, 89% support more mental health funding, 83% support closing the gun show loophole, 72% support red flag laws, and 72% support requiring gun permits when purchasing. In 2017, in the federal budget, there is 80% or more support to retain funding for veterans, infrastructure, Social Security, Medicare, and education.

Political polarization shaped the public's reaction to COVID-19. A study that observed the online conversations surrounding the COVID-19 pandemic found that left-leaning individuals were more likely to criticize politicians compared to right-leaning users. Left-leaning social media accounts often shared disease prevention measures through hashtags. Right-leaning posts were more likely to spread conspiracies and retweet posts from the White House's Twitter account. The study continues to explain that, when considering geographic location, because individuals in conservative and right leaning areas are more likely to see COVID-19 as a non-threat, they are less likely to stay home and follow health guidelines.

== Potential causes ==
Many factors contribute to polarization in American society. While scholars disagree about which factors carry the most explanatory weight, each of the factors below provides a partial explanation of polarization.

=== Elite-driven polarization ===
==== Elite partisanship ====
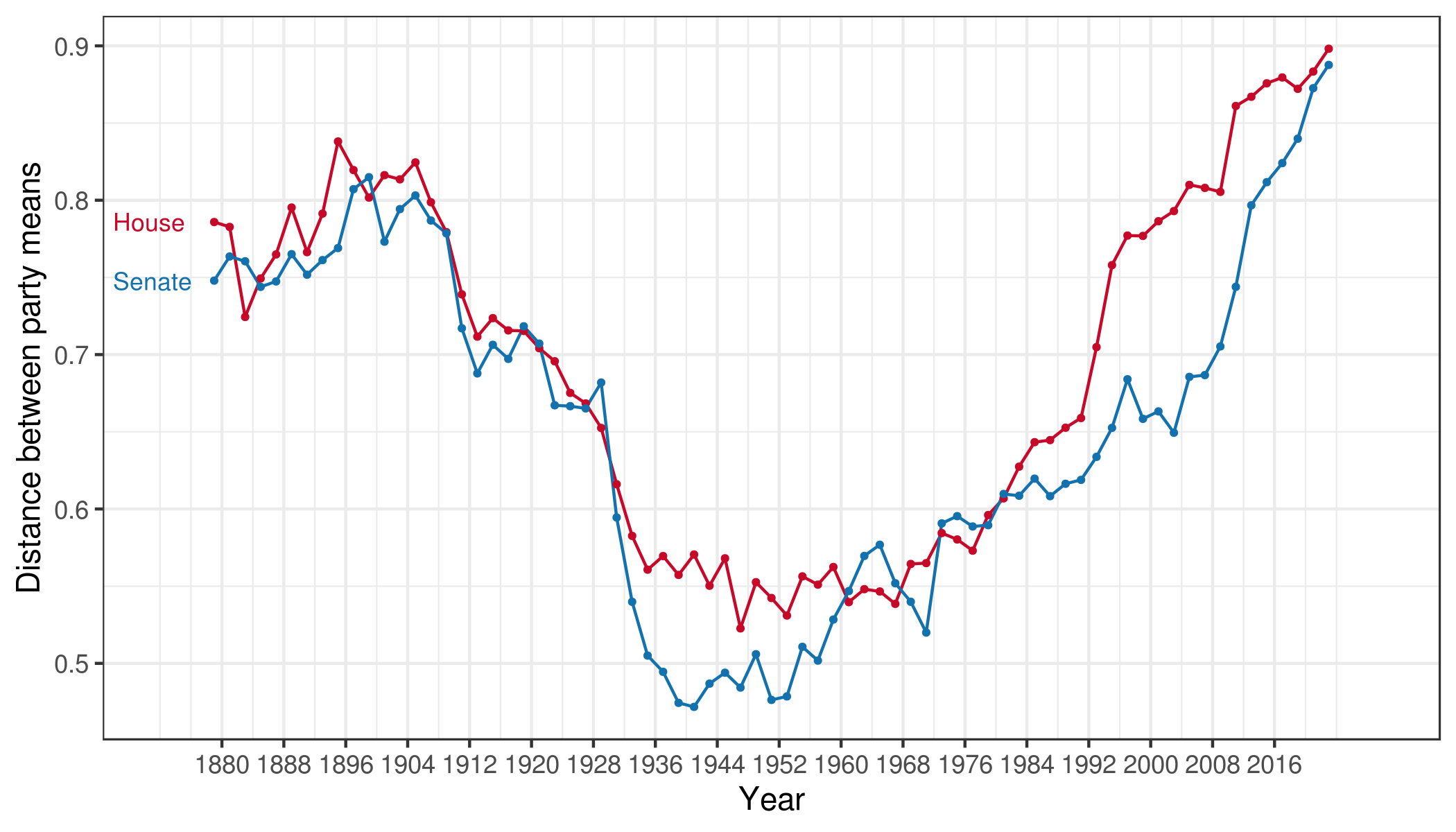
Party polarization in the House and Senate from 1879 to 2023, measured with the DW-NOMINATE scale: the closer to 1 a value is, the more polarized the Congress is at that point in time.

Elites are more polarized than the general public. High-information citizens tend to hold strong opinions, whereas low-information citizens have "fewer and weaker" opinions. When it comes to politics, many citizens are low-information. In one study, 35% of American voters could be classified as low-information "know-nothings."

Research on the relationship between elite and mass polarization has not settled the question of whether elite polarization drives mass polarization, or vice versa. Some studies suggest that ideological polarization among elites tends to increase affective polarization among the public. Other research suggests that elites are actually more ideologically and affectively polarized, and that it is their affective polarization that drives mass affective polarization. This implies that even though elites are better informed about politics and more ideologically consistent, they are also more emotional about politics.

Several institutional and structural features of the American electoral system contribute to elite-driven polarization, by selecting more ideologically extreme candidates and rewarding antagonistic legislative behavior over compromise. These are described below.

==== Party primaries ====
Primary elections select candidates for upcoming general elections. In many states, primaries are closed, which means that only registered party members may vote in that party's primary. Closed primaries exclude millions of independent voters. Because primary election turnout is quite low, their outcomes are generally determined by a committed core of partisans. Because closed primaries do not have to appeal to independent voters, they often produce more ideologically extreme (and hence polarized) candidates. For this reason, some good governance groups advocate for open, non-partisan primaries.

Political scientist Robert Boatright has shown how ideologically extreme groups have taken on a larger role in identifying and bankrolling more extreme candidates in primary elections in recent decades, leading to more moderate incumbents "getting primaried." In 2009 and 2010, for instance, many Republican incumbents lost to more extreme Tea Party candidates in their primaries, leading to a more conservative GOP regaining the House in 2010.

==== Nationalized elections ====
At the same time that primaries have drawn more media attention, elections have in general become more nationalized, that is, issues and candidates are often framed in national rather than local or regional terms. The nationalization of politics contributes to polarization by boiling local politics down to the same national, partisan issues everywhere.

==== Legislative incentives ====
In 2012, some scholars argued that diverging parties has been one of the major driving forces of polarization as policy platforms have become more distant. This theory is based on recent trends in the United States Congress, where the majority party prioritizes the positions that are most aligned with its party platform and political ideology. The adoption of more ideologically distinct positions by political parties can cause polarization among both elites and the electorate. For example, after the passage of the Voting Rights Act, the number of conservative Democrats in Congress decreased, while the number of conservative Republicans increased. Within the electorate during the 1970s, Southern Democrats shifted toward the Republican Party, showing polarization among both the elites and the electorate of both main parties.

In 2007, political scientists showed that politicians have an incentive to advance and support polarized positions. These argue that during the early 1990s, the Republican Party used polarizing tactics to become the majority party in the United States House of Representatives—which political scientists Thomas E. Mann and Norman Ornstein refer to as Newt Gingrich's "guerrilla war". What political scientists have found is that moderates are less likely to run than are candidates who are in line with party doctrine, otherwise known as "party fit".

Other theories state politicians who cater to more extreme groups within their party tend to be more successful, helping them stay in office while simultaneously pulling their constituency toward a polar extreme. A 2012 study by Nicholson found that voters are more polarized by contentious statements from leaders of the opposing party than from the leaders of their own party. As a result, political leaders may be more likely to take polarized stances.

Political fund-raisers and donors can also exert significant influence and control over legislators. Party leaders are expected to be productive fund-raisers, in order to support the party's campaigns. After Citizens United v. Federal Election Commission, special interests in the U.S. were able to greatly impact elections through increased undisclosed spending, notably through Super political action committees. Some, such as Washington Post opinion writer Robert Kaiser, argued this allowed wealthy people, corporations, unions, and other groups to push the parties' policy platforms toward ideological extremes, resulting in a state of greater polarization. Other scholars, such as Raymond J. La Raja and David L. Wiltse, note that this does not necessarily hold true for mass donors to political campaigns. These scholars argue a single donor who is polarized and contributes large sums to a campaign does not seem to usually drive a politician toward political extremes.

Polarization among U.S. legislators is asymmetric, as it has primarily been driven by a substantial rightward shift among congressional Republicans since the 1970s, alongside a much smaller leftward shift among congressional Democrats, which mainly occurred in the early 2010s and mostly on social, cultural, and religious issues.

=== Racial polarization ===
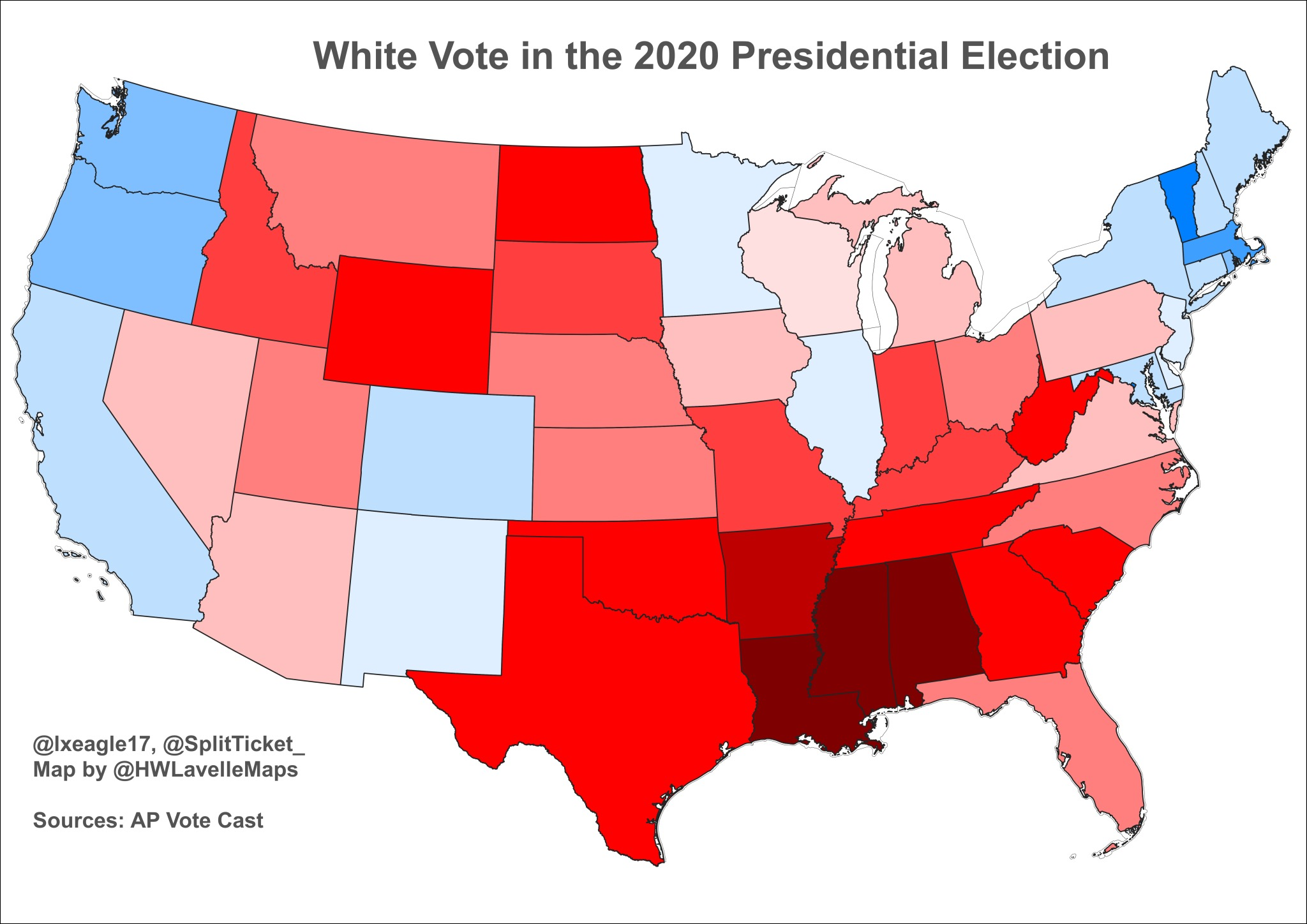
A map of the White vote in the 2020 presidential election by state

Racially polarized voting is extremely high in the Southern United States. In 2014, in some Deep South states, more than 80% of White Americans voted for Republicans, nearly identical to the share of African Americans that vote for Democrats.

=== Educational attainment ===
Thomas Piketty highlighted in his book Capital and Ideology the gradual shift since World War II of those with lower educational attainment increasingly voting for the Republican Party, while those with higher educational attainment increasingly voting for the Democratic Party. In the 1948 United States presidential election, Harry S. Truman received 51% of the vote from those with a high school education and 22% from college-educated voters.

In the 1976 United States presidential election, Jimmy Carter received 54% of the vote among high school graduates and 43% among college graduates. In the 2020 United States presidential election, Donald Trump received 54% of the vote from those with a high school diploma, 47% of the vote from those with a Bachelor's degree, and 37% of the vote from those with a graduate degree.

In 2024, according to political scientists Matt Grossmann and David A. Hopkins, the Republican Party's gains among white voters without college degrees contributed to the rise of right-wing populism.

=== Voting patterns ===
In democracies and other representative governments, citizens vote for the political actors who will represent them. Some scholars argue that political polarization reflects the public's ideology and voting preferences. Dixit and Weibull (2007) claim that political polarization is a natural and regular phenomenon. They argue that there is a link between public differences in ideology and the polarization of representatives, but that an increase in preference differences is usually temporary and ultimately results in compromise. Fernbach, Rogers, Fox and Sloman (2013) argue that it is a result of people having an exaggerated faith in their understanding of complex issues. Asking people to explain their policy preferences in detail typically resulted in more moderate views. Simply asking them to list the reasons for their preferences did not result in any such moderation.

Morris P. Fiorina (2006, 2008) posits the hypothesis that polarization is a phenomenon which does not hold for the public, and instead is formulated by commentators to draw further division in government. Others, such as social psychologist Jonathan Haidt and journalists Bill Bishop and Harry Enten, instead note the growing percentage of the U.S. electorate living in "landslide counties", counties where the popular vote margin between the Democratic and Republican candidate is 20 percentage points or greater.

In 1976, only 27 percent of U.S. voters lived in landslide counties, which increased to 39 percent by 1992. Nearly half of U.S. voters resided in counties that voted for George W. Bush or John Kerry by 20 percentage points or more in 2004. In 2008, 48 percent of U.S. voters lived in such counties, which increased to 50 percent in 2012 and increased further to 61 percent in 2016. In 2020, 58 percent of U.S. voters lived in landslide counties.

At the same time, the 2020 U.S. presidential election marked the ninth consecutive presidential election where the victorious major party nominee did not win a popular vote majority by a double-digit margin over the losing major party nominee(s), continuing the longest sequence of such presidential elections in U.S. history that began in 1988 and in 2016 eclipsed the previous longest sequences from 1836 through 1860 and from 1876 through 1900. (Note: In every presidential election from 1788–89 through 1828, multiple state legislatures selected their presidential electors by direct appointment rather than conducting a statewide poll, while the South Carolina General Assembly did so in every presidential election through 1860 and the Colorado General Assembly selected its state's electors by direct appointment in the 1876 election.) Other studies indicate that cultural differences focusing on ideological movements and geographical polarization within the United States constituency is correlated with rises in overall political polarization between 1972 and 2004.

=== Demographic changes ===
Religious, ethnic, and other cultural divides within the public have often influenced the emergence of polarization. According to Layman et al. (2005), the ideological split between U.S. Republicans and Democrats also crosses into the religious cultural divide. They claim that Democrats have generally become more moderate in religious views whereas Republicans have become more traditionalist. For example, political scientists have shown that in the United States, voters who identify as Republican are more likely to vote for a strongly evangelical candidate than Democratic voters. This correlates with the rise in polarization in the United States. Another theory contends that religion does not contribute to full-group polarization, but rather, coalition and party activist polarization causes party shifts toward a political extreme.

A 2020 paper studying polarization across countries found a correlation between increasing polarization and increasing ethnic diversity, both of which are happening in the United States.

=== Redistricting ===
The impact of redistricting—potentially through gerrymandering or the manipulation of electoral borders to favor a political party—on political polarization in the United States has been found to be minimal in research by leading political scientists. The logic for this minimal effect is twofold: first, gerrymandering is typically accomplished by packing opposition voters into a minority of congressional districts in a region, while distributing the preferred party's voters over a majority of districts by a slimmer majority than otherwise would have existed. The result of this is that the number of competitive congressional districts would be expected to increase, and in competitive districts representatives have to compete with the other party for the median voter, who tends to be more ideologically moderate. Second, political polarization has also occurred in the Senate, which does not experience redistricting because Senators represent fixed geographical units, i.e. states.

The argument that redistricting, through gerrymandering, would contribute to political polarization is based on the idea that new non-competitive districts created would lead to the election of extremist candidates representing the supermajority party, with no accountability to the voice of the minority. One difficulty in testing this hypothesis is to disentangle gerrymandering effects from natural geographical sorting through individuals moving to congressional districts with a similar ideological makeup to their own. Carson et al. (2007), has found that redistricting has contributed to the greater level of polarization in the House of Representatives than in the Senate, however that this effect has been "relatively modest". Politically motivated redistricting has been associated with the rise in partisanship in the U.S. House of Representatives between 1992 and 1994.

Majoritarian electoral institutions have been linked to polarization. However, ending gerrymandering practices in redistricting cannot correct for increased polarization due to the growing percentage of the U.S. electorate living in "landslide counties", counties where the popular vote margin between the Democratic and Republican candidate is 20 percentage points or greater. Of the 92 U.S. House seats ranked by The Cook Political Report as swing seats in 1996 that transitioned to being non-competitive by 2016, only 17 percent came as a result of changes to district boundaries while 83 percent came from natural geographic sorting of the electorate election to election.

=== Changes in the media ecosystem ===
A 2013 review concluded that there is no firm evidence that media institutions contributed to the polarization of average Americans in the last three decades of the 20th century. No evidence supports the idea that longstanding news outlets become increasingly partisan. Analyses confirm that the tone of evening news broadcasts remained unchanged from 1968 to 1996: largely centrist, with a small but constant bias towards Democratic Party positions. More partisan media pockets have emerged in blogs, podcasts, talk radio, websites, and cable news channels, which are much more likely to use insulting language, mockery, and extremely dramatic reactions, collectively referred to as "outrage".

People who have strongly partisan viewpoints are more likely to watch partisan news. A 2017 study found no correlation between increased media and Internet consumption and increased political polarization, although the data did confirm a larger increase in polarization among individuals over 65 compared to those aged 18–39. A 2020 paper comparing polarization across several wealthy countries found no consistent trend, prompting Ezra Klein to reject the theory that the Internet and social media were the underlying cause of the increase in the United States.

Along with political scientist Sam Abrams, social psychologist Jonathan Haidt argues that political elites in the United States became more polarized beginning in the 1990s as the Greatest Generation and the Silent Generation (fundamentally shaped by their living memories of World War I, World War II, and the Korean War) were gradually replaced with Baby boomers and Generation Jones (fundamentally shaped by their living memories of the U.S. culture war of the 1960s). Haidt argues that because of the difference in their life experience relevant to moral foundations, Baby boomers and Generation Jones may be more prone to what he calls "Manichean thinking," and along with Abrams and FIRE President Greg Lukianoff, Haidt argues that changes made by Newt Gingrich to the parliamentary procedure of the U.S. House of Representatives beginning in 1995 made the chamber more partisan.

Unlike the first half of the 20th century, protests of the 1960s civil rights movement (such as the Selma to Montgomery marches in 1965) were televised, along with police brutality and urban race rioting during the latter half of the decade. In 1992, 60 percent of U.S. households held cable television subscriptions in the United States, and Haidt, Abrams, and Lukianoff argue that the expansion of cable television, and Fox News in particular since 2015 in their coverage of student activism over political correctness at colleges and universities in the United States, is one of the principal factors amplifying political polarization since the 1990s.

Haidt and Lukianoff argue that the filter bubbles created by the News Feed algorithm of Facebook and other social media platforms are also one of the principal factors amplifying political polarization since 2000, when a majority of U.S. households first had at least one personal computer and then internet access in 2001. In 2002, a majority of U.S. survey respondents reported having a mobile phone.

Big data algorithms are used in personalized content creation and automatization; however, this method can be used to manipulate users in various ways. The problem of misinformation is exacerbated by the educational bubble, users' critical thinking ability and news culture. In a 2015 study, 62.5% of the Facebook users were oblivious to any curation of their News Feed. Scientists have started to investigate algorithms with unexpected outcomes that may lead to antisocial political, economic, geographic, racial, or other discrimination. Facebook has remained scarce in transparency of the inner workings of the algorithms used for News Feed correlation.

Algorithms use the past activities as a reference point for predicting users' taste to keep them engaged. This leads to the formation of a filter bubble that starts to refrain users from diverse information. Users are left with a skewed worldview derived from their own preferences and biases.

In 2015, researchers from Facebook published a study indicating that the Facebook algorithm perpetuates an echo chamber amongst users by occasionally hiding content from individual feeds that users potentially would disagree with: for example the algorithm removed one in every 13 diverse content from news sources for self-identified liberals. In general, the results from the study indicated that the Facebook algorithm ranking system caused approximately 15% less diverse material in users' content feeds, and a 70% reduction in the click-through-rate of the diverse material.

At least in the political field, Facebook has a counter-effect on being informed: in two studies from the US with a total of more than 2,000 participants, the influence of social media on the general knowledge on political issues was examined in the context of two US presidential elections. The results showed that the frequency of Facebook use was moderately negatively related to general political knowledge. This was also the case when considering demographic, political-ideological variables and previous political knowledge. According to the latter, a causal relationship is indicated: the higher the Facebook use, the more the general political knowledge declines. In 2019, social psychologist Jonathan Haidt argued that there is a "very good chance American democracy will fail, that in the next 30 years we will have a catastrophic failure of our democracy."

==== Influence operations ====
According to a report by Oxford by researchers including sociologist Philip N. Howard, social media played a major role in political polarization in the United States, due to computational propaganda -- "the use of automation, algorithms, and big-data analytics to manipulate public life"—such as the spread of fake news and conspiracy theories. The researchers highlighted the role of the Russian Internet Research Agency in attempts to undermine democracy in the US and exacerbate existing political divisions. The most prominent methods of misinformation were ostensibly organic posts rather than ads, and influence operation activity increased after, and was not limited to, the 2016 election.

During the Russian interference in the 2016 United States elections, examples of efforts included "campaigning for African American voters to boycott elections or follow the wrong voting procedures in 2016", "encouraging extreme right-wing voters to be more confrontational", and "spreading sensationalist, conspiratorial, and other forms of junk political news and misinformation to voters across the political spectrum." Sarah Kreps of Brookings Institution argue that in the wake of foreign influence operations which are nothing new but boosted by digital tools, the U.S. has had to spend exorbitantly on defensive measures "just to break even on democratic legitimacy."

According to the United States House Permanent Select Committee on Intelligence, by 2018 organic content created by Russia's Internet Research Agency reached at least 126 million US Facebook users, while its politically divisive ads reached 11.4 million US Facebook users. Tweets by the IRA reached approximately 288 million American users. According to committee chair Adam Schiff, "[The Russian] social media campaign was designed to further a broader Kremlin objective: sowing discord in the U.S. by inflaming passions on a range of divisive issues. The Russians did so by weaving together fake accounts, pages, and communities to push politicized content and videos, and to mobilize real Americans to sign online petitions and join rallies and protests."

In 2020, Michael McFaul, former U.S. Ambassador to Russia from 2012 to 2014, stated that he believes the U.S. has faced a democratic decline, stemming from elite polarization and damage done by President Donald Trump to trust in elections and bonds with democratic allies. McFaul states that the decline in democracy weakens national security and heavily restrains foreign policy. Portrayals of violence in the media can lead to fear of crime or terrorism or fear of "other" groups. These can appear out of proportion to their actual frequency, and due to the availability heuristic, these fears can be out of proportion to the actual threat from other groups.

=== Campaigning ===
A change in campaigning in 2022 that has been called "both a symptom of and a contributor to the ills" of American politics is a move away from participation in debates between candidates, in "retail politicking" that has been a political "cliché ... for generations" in American politics: pressing the flesh at "diners and state fairs ... town-hall-style meetings ... where citizens get to question their elected leaders and those running to replace them". Replacing these are "safer spaces" for candidates, "partisan news outlets, fund-raisers with supporters, friendly local crowds," where reporters and their challenging questions are "muscled away".

Candidates in ten of the most competitive contests in 2022 for Senate (Arizona, North Carolina, Ohio, Georgia and Wisconsin) and governor (Texas and Wisconsin) have "agreed to just one debate, where voters not long ago could have expected to watch two or three". Observers see a danger in candidates avoiding those tougher interactions cuts down on the opportunities for candidates' characters and limitations to be revealed, and for elected officials to be held accountable to those who elected them. For the politicians, it creates an artificial environment where their positions appear uniformly popular and opposing views are angrily denounced, making compromise seem risky.

"They run these campaigns in bubbles to these voters who are in bubbles", said former Representative Tom Davis, a moderate Republican who won seven terms in Congress in a Northern Virginia district and headed his party's congressional campaign committee.

Causes suggested for the disinterest include the fewer competitive House of Representative districts, and fewer "swing voters", making attempts to appeal to those voters not cost effective. According to journalists Lisa Lerer and Jazmine Ulloa, "the trend of avoiding the public was initially driven by Republicans" but has "seeped across party lines" so that now, Democrats also avoid voters.

=== Economic inequality, unemployment and cultural issues ===
Evidence suggests that there is a correlation between high levels of economic inequality and increased political polarization. According to Jonathan Hopkin in 2020, decades of neoliberal policies, which made the United States "the most extreme case of the subjection of society to the brute force of the market," resulted in unprecedented levels of inequality, and combined with an unstable financial system and limited political choices, paved the way for political instability and revolt, as evidenced by the resurgence of the American left as represented by Bernie Sanders’ 2016 presidential campaign and the rise of an "unlikely figure" like Donald Trump to the presidency of the United States. According to a 2020 study, "polarization is more intense when unemployment and inequality are high" and "when political elites clash over cultural issues such as immigration and national identity."

=== Absence of external threats ===
One common hypothesis for polarization in the United States is the end of the Cold War and a greater absence of severe security threats. A 2021 study disputed this, finding little evidence that external threats reduce polarization.

== Effects ==
=== Demonization ===
Potentially both a cause and effect of polarization is "demonization" of political opponents, such as accusing them not just of being wrong about certain legislation or policies but of hating their country, or the use of what are called 'devil terms' — defined by communications professor Jennifer Mercieca as "things that are so unquestionably bad that you can't have a debate about them". Some examples include the accusations that President Biden had a plan to "flood our country with terrorists, fentanyl, child traffickers, and MS-13 gang members", and that "Under President Biden's leadership ... We face an unprecedented assault on the American way of life by the radical left" (Mary E. Miller-IL), that "Democrats are so enamored of power that they want to legalize cheating in elections," (Andy Biggs-AZ), "America-hating Socialists seek to upend the American way of life based on freedom and liberty and replace it with dictatorial government that controls every aspect of our lives" (Mo Brooks-AL).

While "demonizing communication style" has been in use "for years" among "media personalities and the occasional firebrand lawmaker", its use became popular among high level politicians with the election of Donald Trump and with the 2022 election has become widespread among "the 139 House Republicans who challenged the Electoral College vote" in January 2021, according to a 2022 study of "divisive rhetoric" in 3.7 million "tweets, Facebook ads, newsletters and congressional speeches" by The New York Times. Checking the Congressional Record, the Times found Republicans have "more than quadrupled their use of divisive rhetoric" since the early 2010s.

An example of the escalation in aggressive attack is Republican House leader Kevin McCarthy, who after the January 6 protests "implored members of his party to tone down their speech", saying, 'We all must acknowledge how our words have contributed to the discord in America ... No more name calling, us versus them.'" However in "dozens of tweets since then" McCarthy has referred to "Democrats as 'radical' leftists" who "prefer China to the United States" and are "ruining America". A "few Democrats", such as former Representative Bill Pascrell of New Jersey, also have "frequently" used "demonizing speech on Twitter". Some political scientists have warned that "factionalism is alarming because it makes compromise harder and normalizes" divisive rhetoric throughout the country.

=== Political violence ===
Some authors have found a correlation between polarization of political discourse and the prevalence of political violence. For instance, Rachel Kleinfeld, an expert on the rule of law and post-conflict governance, writes that political violence is extremely calculated and, while it may appear "spontaneous," it is the culmination of years of "discrimination and social segregation." A 2021 analysis by Kleinfeld found that despite efforts to reduce affective polarization, there is little evidence that it correlates with political violence.

Hyper-partisanship can foster political violence. As polarization and partisanship grow, some individuals may resort to violence to further a political agenda, such as the January 6 United States Capitol attack. At other times, the violence may be aimed at punishing political enemies, such as the attack on Paul Pelosi. Today, most political violence emanates from the far-right, in contrast to the 1960s and 1970s. One can also find examples of political violence from the political left, such as the 2017 Congressional baseball shooting aimed at Republicans, and Floyd Corkins's attack and attempted mass murder of staff at the Family Research Council in protest of their opposition to LGBTQ+ rights.

American popular culture is fascinated with the prospects of political violence. The 2024 feature film Civil War explores the possibility of wide-scale political violence in the US today. The Twitter feed #secondcivilwar offers a more ambivalent, satirical perspective. There is mixed data regarding actual support for political violence among Americans today. In 2020, political scientists found that support for political violence had grown among both Democrats and Republicans: in 2017, only 8% of both Democrats and Republicans agreed that the use of political violence is at least "a little justified" if it advances their party's political agenda, but as of September 2020, that number jumped to 33% and 36%, respectively.

In 2024, according to the Polarization Research Lab, fewer than 4% of Americans support political violence. In any case, the current polarized climate may create conditions that lead to more support for political violence within the country, unless there is meaningful reform.

=== Trust in science ===
The General Social Survey periodically asks Americans whether they trust scientists. The proportion of American conservatives who say they place "a great deal of trust" in scientists fell from 48% in 1974 to 35% in 2010 and rose again to 39% in 2018. Instead, liberals and independents report different levels of trust in science. The COVID-19 pandemic brought these differences front and center, with partisanship often being an indicator of how a citizen saw the gravity of the crisis. In the early stages of the pandemic, Republican governors often went against the advice of infectious disease experts while most of their Democratic counterparts translated the advice into policies such as stay at home orders.

Similar to other polarizing topics in the United States, a person's attitude towards COVID-19 became a matter of political identity. While the crisis had very little precedent in U.S. history, reactions from both liberals and conservatives stemmed from long-held messaging cues among their parties. Conservatives responded to the anti-elite, states' rights, and small government messaging cues surrounding the virus. This then translated into avid hostility towards any measure that limited a person's autonomy (mask requirements, schools closing, lockdowns, vaccine mandates, etc.). Meanwhile, liberals' attitude towards science made them more likely to follow the guidance from institutions like the CDC and well-known medical experts, such as Dr. Anthony Fauci.

=== Congress ===
Political polarization among elites is negatively correlated with legislative efficiency, which is defined by the total number of laws passed, as well as the number of "major enactments" and "key votes". Evidence suggests that political polarization of elites may more strongly affect efficiency than polarization of Congress itself, with authors hypothesizing that the personal relationships among members of Congress may enable them to reach compromises on contentiously advocated legislation, though not if elites allow no leeway for such.

Negative effects of polarization on the United States Congress include increased gridlock and partisanship at the cost of quality and quantity of passed legislation. It also incentivizes stall tactics and closed rules, such as filibusters and excluding minority party members from committee deliberations. These strategies hamper transparency, oversight, and the government's ability to handle long-term domestic issues, especially those regarding the distribution of benefits. They foster animosity, as majority parties lose bipartisan and legislative coordination trying to expedite legislation to overcome them.

Some scholars claim that political polarization is not so pervasive or destructive in influence, contending that partisan agreement is the historical trend in Congress and still frequent in the modern era, including on bills of political importance. Some studies have found approximately 80% of House bills passed in the modern era to have had support from both parties.

The January 6 Capitol Attack and the associated election denialism among congressional Republicans contributed to a decline in bipartisan legislative collaboration in subsequent Congresses, in particular for the Republicans who voted not to certify the 2020 election.

=== The public ===
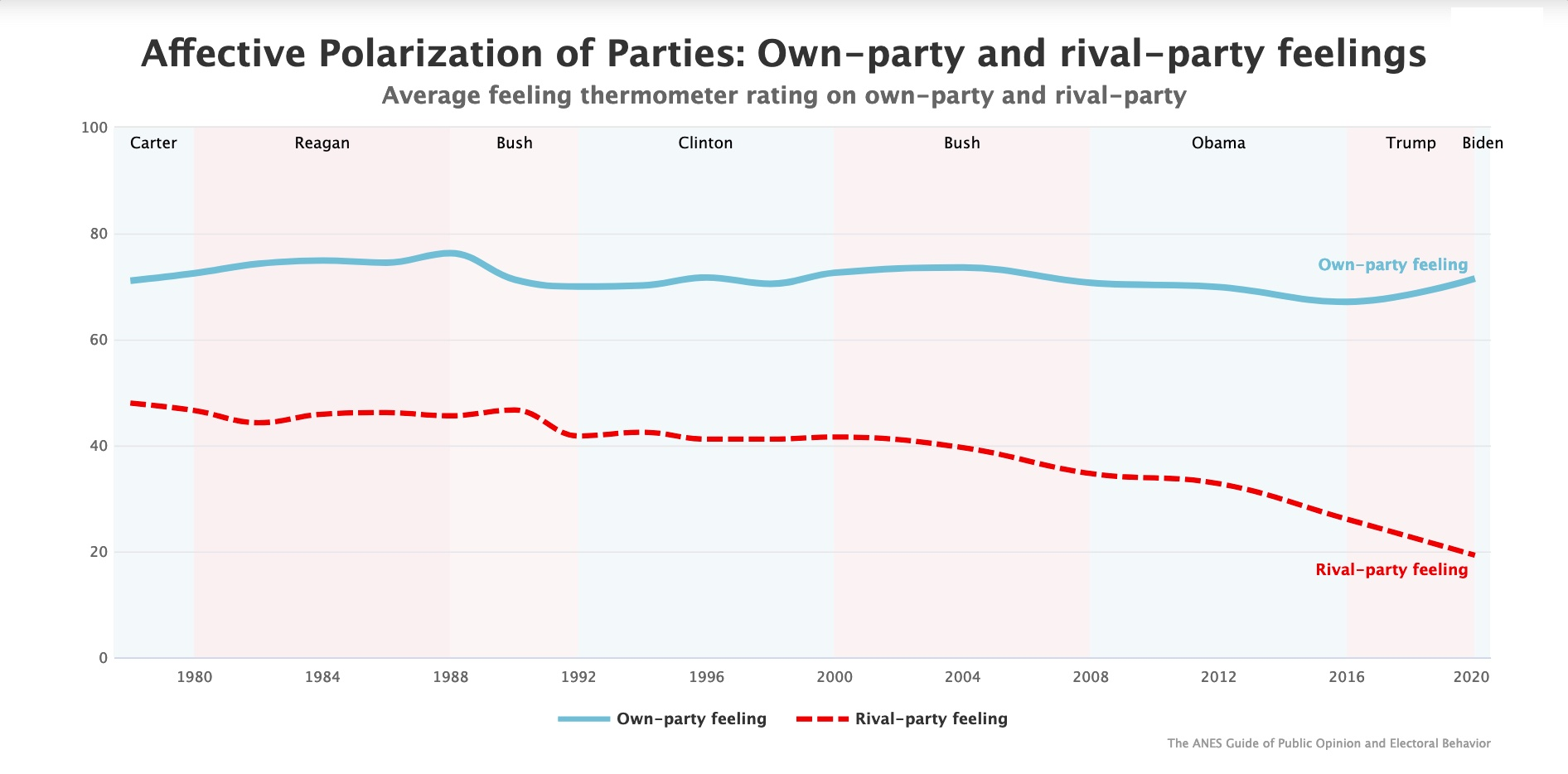
Feelings towards own political party and rival party in the U.S., 1976 to 2020.

Opinions on polarization's effects on the public are mixed. Some argue that the growing polarization in government has directly contributed to political polarization in the electorate, but this is not unanimous.

Some scholars argue that polarization lowers public interest in politics, party identification and voter turnout. It encourages confrontational dynamics between parties that can lower overall public trust and approval in government., and causes the public to perceive the general political debate as less civil, which can alienate voters. More polarized candidates, especially when voters aren't aware of the increase, also tend to be less representative of the public's wishes.

On the other hand, others assert that elite polarization has galvanized the public's political participation in the United States, citing greater voting and nonvoting participation, engagement and investment in campaigns, and increased positive attitude toward government responsiveness. Polarized parties become more ideologically unified, furthering voter knowledge about their positions and increasing their standard to similarly aligned voters.

Affective polarization has risen in the US, with members of the public likely to say that supporters of the other major political party are hypocritical, closed-minded, and selfish. Based on survey results by the American National Election Study, affective polarization has increased significantly since 1980. This was determined by the differences of views an individual had of their political party and the views they had of the other party. Americans have also gotten increasingly uncomfortable with the idea of their child marrying someone of another political party. In 1960, 4–5% of Americans said they were uncomfortable with the idea. By 2010, a third of Democrats would be upset at this outcome, and half of all Republicans. However, a recent study shows that affective polarization in Europe may not be primarily driven by outgroup derogation.

=== The media ===
As Mann and Ornstein argue, political polarization and the proliferation of media sources have "reinforce[d] tribal divisions, while enhancing a climate where facts are no longer driving the debate and deliberation, nor are they shared by the larger public." As other scholars have argued, the media often support and provoke the stall and closed rules tactics that disrupt regular policy procedure.

Media can give the illusion that the electorate is more polarized than it truly is, pushing each end farther from the middle. The digital environment allows for the customization of information, with individuals never seemingly being exposed to opposing viewpoints. There is a long-standing belief that exposure to both sides of an argument will moderate political attitudes, and there is empirical evidence that voters often do self-moderate, saying that internet users do also search for news in the opposing viewpoint.

The increased use of social media since 2008 has encouraged those who normally did not consume news coverage to now encounter headlines on their newsfeeds on a regular basis. The media has become more skilled about framing news stories to create the greatest outrage, regardless of their spot on the political spectrum. With the prevalence of "fake news", voters are more apt to cherry-pick between news sources as mistrust in the mainstream media rises. This mistrust stems from a number of factors, some of which include: political micro-targeting, bots, trolls, and digital algorithms – research having only just begun to name all of the factors at play. Allowing these perpetrators of political polarization to stand in the way of democracy is the biggest hindrance to healthy party disagreement.

A concern with the increasing trend of political polarization is the social stigma stemming from either side towards their perceived opposition. It contributes to the chronic lack of compromise and uncivilized discourse leading to both extremism and policy stalemates. The media takes advantage of such discord and shares anecdotal headlines meant to stoke the flames of polarization, rather than sharing generalized and subsequently tamer broad statistics.

While the media are not immune to general public opinion and reduced polarization allows them to appeal to a larger audience, polarized environments make it easier for the media and interest groups to hold elected officials more accountable for their policy promises and positions, which is generally healthy for democracy.

=== Trust in the democratic process ===
The issue of political polarization in the US has also had noticeable effects on how citizens view the democratic process. In both of the two last presidential elections, a large segment of voters among the losing party raised concerns about the fairness of the election. When Donald Trump won the 2016 election, the share of Democratic voters who were "not confident" in the election results more than doubled compared to pre-election day data (14% on October 15, 2016, versus 28% on January 28, 2017). In 2020, three-in-four Republicans doubted the fairness of the presidential election.

This narrative of a stolen election was in large part driven by Trump himself, who refused to concede the election up until less than two weeks before Joe Biden's inauguration. This took place after the events of January 6, 2021, when thousands of Trump's supporters stormed the United States Capitol in an attempt to overturn the results of the election. Trump has continued to claim the election was stolen in 2026, which many analyze he’s doing to cast doubt on the 2026 midterms.

=== Judicial systems ===
Judicial systems can also be affected by the implications of political polarization. For the United States, in particular, polarization lowers confirmation rates of judges; In 2012, the confirmation rate of presidential circuit court appointments was approximately 50% as opposed to the above 90% rate in the late 1970s and early 1980s. More polarized parties have more aggressively blocked nominees and used tactics to hinder executive agendas. Political scientist Sarah Binder (2000) argues that "senatorial intolerance for the opposing party's nominees is itself a function of polarization."

Negative consequences of this include higher vacancy rates on appellate courts, longer case-processing times and increased caseloads for judges. Voting margins have become much closer for filling vacancies on the Supreme Court. Justice Antonin Scalia was confirmed 98–0 in 1986; Ruth Bader Ginsburg was confirmed 96–3 in 1993. Samuel Alito was confirmed 58–42 in 2005, and Brett Kavanaugh was confirmed 50–48 in 2018. Additionally, the Republican Senate refused to vote on Merrick Garland's Supreme Court nomination, while rushing to confirm Amy Coney Barrett.

Political scientists argue that in highly polarized periods, nominees become less reflective of the moderate voter as "polarization impacts the appointment and ideological tenor of new federal judges." It also influences the politics of senatorial advice and consent, giving partisan presidents the power to appoint judges far to the left or right of center on the federal bench, obstructing the legitimacy of the judicial branch.

Ultimately, the increasing presence of ideology in a judicial system impacts the judiciary's credibility. Polarization can generate strong partisan critiques of federal judges, which can damage the public perception of the justice system and the legitimacy of the courts as nonpartisan legal arbiters.

=== Foreign policy ===
Political polarization can undermine the reliability of the US's alliance commitments, as well as undercut its credibility as an adversary. It makes it harder for the US to maintain a stable foreign policy and credibly signal its intentions. Political polarization can undercut unified agreement on foreign policy and harm a nation's international standing; divisiveness on foreign affairs strengthens enemies, discourages allies, and destabilizes a nation's determination.

Political scientists point to two primary implications of polarization with regard to the foreign policy of the United States. First, when the United States conducts relations abroad and appears divided, allies are less likely to trust its promises, enemies are more likely to predict its weaknesses, and uncertainty as to the country's position in world affairs rises. Second, elite opinion has a significant impact on the public's perception and understanding of foreign policy, a field where Americans have less prior knowledge to rely on.

=== Democratic backsliding ===
A 2021 study in Public Opinion Quarterly found evidence that polarization contributed to reductions in support for democratic norms.

In a 2021 report Freedom House said that political polarization was a cause of democratic backsliding in the U.S. since political polarization undermines the "idea of a common national identity" and impedes solutions to governance problems. Gerrymandering was singled out as a cause for this since it creates safe seats for one party that can lead it to become more radical so its candidates can win their primary elections.

== Proposed solutions ==
As polarization creates a less than ideal political climate, scholars have proposed multiple solutions to fix or mitigate the effects of the political polarization in the United States. As of 2025, polarization was higher than any point in current history, causing less collaboration and mutual understanding between Democrats and Republicans, and members of both political parties increasingly view each other in an extremely negative way.

As a result, partisan politics has begun to shape the relationships individuals have with others, with 50% of Republicans and 35% of Democrats likely to surround themselves with friends who share similar political views. Towards the respective ends of the political spectrum, nearly two-thirds (63%) of consistent conservatives and about half (49%) of consistent liberals say most of their close friends share their political views. Additionally, increased animosity and distrust among American politicians and citizens can be attributed to the increased skepticism of American institutions, which is a problem that is extremely catalyzed by political polarization and may lead to democratic backsliding.

=== Voting process reform ===
Various changes to voting procedures have been proposed to reduce political polarization. Two proposed reforms would potentially move the U.S. from a two-party system to a multi-party system. A form of proportional representation would divide Congressional seats based on the percentage of people who voted for a specific political party. For instance, if Democrats won 20% of the vote, they would receive roughly 20% of the Congressional seats.

Advocates of instant-runoff voting, or its multi-member equivalent, single transferable vote, say it encourages more moderation in political campaigns by allowing candidates to argue they should be the second choice for supporters of an opponent. It could potentially be used to replace the Electoral College with a less partisan popular vote.

Elaine Kamarck of the Brookings Institution suggest ways to work within the two-party system, such as taking measures to increase voter turnout to elect more moderate representatives in Congress. She reasons that abolishing closed primaries may invite independents or individuals from the opposing political party to vote for a representative other than their registered party's candidate. In doing so, the strict ideological divides may subside, allowing for more moderate representatives to be elected. As a result, there would be an increasing ideological overlap in Congress and less polarization.

Kamarck also proposes instituting a nationwide voting process like "California's top-two method," where there is only one general election for all political parties, and the top two candidates advance into the general election. Once again, this process is meant to elect more moderates into government, but there is no evidence that this has happened.

Advocates for setting fixed terms for selection of the justices of the Supreme Court of the United States argue it will reduce the partisanship of confirmation battles if both major parties are satisfied they will have the chance to make a certain number of appointments.

=== Intergroup contact ===
Shifting to a more societal-based solution, social psychologists state that more social contact with those holding opposing political views may help mitigate political polarization. Lawrence Lessig argues for citizens' assemblies to start to unwind polarization. Assemblies create a space where representatives and citizens are encouraged to discuss political topics and issues in a constructive fashion, hopefully resulting in compromise or mutual understanding. Yet, intergroup contact, as psychologists warn, must be created within specific parameters in order to create meaningful change. These boundaries, which make actual social implementation difficult, include a constant, meaningful dialogue between multiple members of each group.

Constructive conversations should focus on principles, legislation, and policies and avoid inflammatory trigger words such as left and right, blue and red, and liberal and conservative. These words can make people become emotional and defensive when supporting their own side and stop listening with an open mind to what those on the other side are saying. In short, conversations can be more productive and meaningful by avoiding contrasting tribal and political identities. In Talking Sense about Politics: How to Overcome Political Polarization in Your Next Conversation, Jack Meacham encourages having conversations based on four neutral, impartial perspectives—detached, loyal, caring, and tactful—that underlie how people think about and respond to political issues. A number of groups in the U.S. actively host interpartisan discussions in an attempt to promote understanding and social cohesion.

=== Social and historical complexity ===
A third solution recognizes that American society, history, and political thought are more complex than what can be conveyed by only two partisan positions. Joel Garreau's The Nine Nations of North America, first published in 1981, was an early attempt to analyse such multiple positions. Colin Woodard revisited Garreau's theories in his 2011 book American Nations. Frank Bruni wrote that America was emerging from the 2016 election with four political parties: Paul Ryan Republicans, a Freedom Caucus, establishment Democrats, and an Elizabeth Warren and Bernie Sanders party. Similarly, David Brooks in 2016 identified four political parties: Trump's populist nationalism, a libertarian Freedom Caucus, a Bernie Sanders and Elizabeth Warren progressive party, and a Chuck Schumer and Nancy Pelosi Democratic establishment party.

In Talking Sense about Politics: How to Overcome Political Polarization in Your Next Conversation, Jack Meacham argues that four fundamental, impartial perspectives have powered our economic and social progress and enabled Americans to better understand themselves and others. People holding the first of these four perspectives, the loyal perspective, aim to compete, be in charge, and win. The aim of people holding the second perspective, tactful, is to negotiate and get along with others. The third perspective, detached, is represented by people who want to disengage from others and work things out for themselves. People who reflect the fourth perspective, caring, aim to cooperate with and look out for others.

George Packer, in Last Best Hope: America in Crisis and Renewal, also argues that America can best be understood not as two polarities but instead as four American narratives:

- Free America, focuses on personal freedom, consumer capitalism, and hostility to government.
- The smart America narrative includes professionals who value novelty and diversity, embrace meritocracy, and welcome globalization.
- The real America narrative includes the working class—anti-intellectual, nationalist, religious, and white supremacist.
- And the just America narrative includes educated younger people for whom American institutions are unjust, corrupt, and fail to address issues of environment, race, and gender.

There are eight social classes in America, according to David Brooks.

- The four classes of a red hierarchy include (1) corporate executives and entrepreneurs; (2) large property-owning families; (3) middle managers and small-business owners; and (4) the rural working class.
- The four classes of a blue hierarchy include (5) tech and media executives, (6) foundation heads and highly successful doctors and lawyers; (7) a creative class of scientists, engineers, lawyers, professors, doctors, and other professionals; a younger educated elite with growing cultural power; and (8) low-paid members of the service sector.

The Pew Research Center's political typology, based on a survey of 10,221 adults in July 2021, includes nine groups. There are substantial divisions within both the Democratic and Republican parties.

- The Democrats include (a) progressive left, (b) establishment liberals, (c) democratic mainstays, and (d) outsider left.
- The Republicans include (e) faith and flag conservatives, (f) committed conservatives, (g) populist right, and (h) ambivalent right.
- Stressed sideliner is a ninth group with no partisan leaning.

Outsider left, ambivalent right, and stressed sideliners have low interest in politics and low rates of voting.

=== Accommodation ===
Some commentators propose accommodating partisan differences by taking advantage of federalism and moving more authority away from the federal government and into state and local governments. Ezra Klein proposes that having clear differences between the two main parties gives voters a better choice than having two political parties that have mostly the same views. But he suggests reducing the negative consequences of partisanship by eliminating "ticking time bombs" like fights over raising the federal debt ceiling.

=== Secession along party lines ===
Various editorials have proposed that states of the U.S. secede and then form federations only with states that have voted for the same political party. These editorials note the increasingly polarized political strife in the U.S. between Republican voters and Democratic voters. They propose partition of the U.S. as a way of allowing both groups to achieve their policy goals while reducing the chances of civil war. Red states and blue states are states that typically vote for the Republican and Democratic parties, respectively.

A 2021 poll found that 52% of Trump voters and 41% of Biden voters support partitioning the United States into multiple countries based on political party lines. A different poll that same year grouped the United States into five geographic regions, and found that 37% of Americans favored secession of their own region. 44% of Americans in the South favored secession, with Republican support at 66%; while Democratic support was 47% in the Pacific states.

== See also ==
- Cook Partisan Voting Index – Political statistical index
- Income inequality in the United States § Political polarization
- Pillarisation – Division of civil society along religio-political lines
- Problem Solvers Caucus – Bipartisan group of U.S. representatives
