= Wharton School =

Business school in Pennsylvania, US

The Wharton School of the University of Pennsylvania
- Other names: The Wharton School of Business, The Wharton School, Wharton
- Former names: Wharton School of Finance and Economy (1881–1902); Wharton School of Finance and Commerce (1902–1972)
- Motto: Knowledge for action
- Type: Private business school
- Established: 1881; 145 years ago
- Founder: Joseph Wharton
- Parent institution: University of Pennsylvania
- Accreditation: AACSB International
- Endowment: $21 billion (2023, parent)
- Dean: Erika H. James
- Faculty: 486 (2018) (Note: 241 standing faculty members plus 243 non-standing faculty members)
- Students: 5,063 (2018)
- Undergraduates: 2,617 (2018)
- Postgraduates: 1,784 MBA (2018); 463 EMBA (2018); 199 PhD (2018)
- Location: Philadelphia, Pennsylvania, US; 39°57′12″N 75°11′53″W
- Website: wharton.upenn.edu

The Wharton School (/ˈhwɔːrtən/ WHOR-tən) is the business school of the University of Pennsylvania, a private Ivy League research university in Philadelphia, Pennsylvania, United States. Established in 1881 through a donation from Joseph Wharton, a co-founder of Bethlehem Steel, the Wharton School is the world's oldest collegiate business school. It is one of six business schools in the Ivy League and the business school which has educated the highest number of billionaires in America, including Warren Buffett, Elon Musk, Sundar Pichai, and US president Donald Trump.

The Wharton School awards undergraduate and graduate degrees with a school-specific economics major and concentrations in 18 disciplines in Wharton's academic departments. The undergraduate degree is a general business degree focused on core business skills. At the graduate level, the Master of Business Administration program can be pursued by itself or along with dual studies leading to a joint degree from the University of Pennsylvania's law, engineering, and government schools.

In addition to its tracks in accounting, finance, operations, statistics, and other academic departments, the doctoral and post-doctoral programs co-sponsor several diploma programs in conjunction with other schools within the university.

== History ==
=== Founding ===
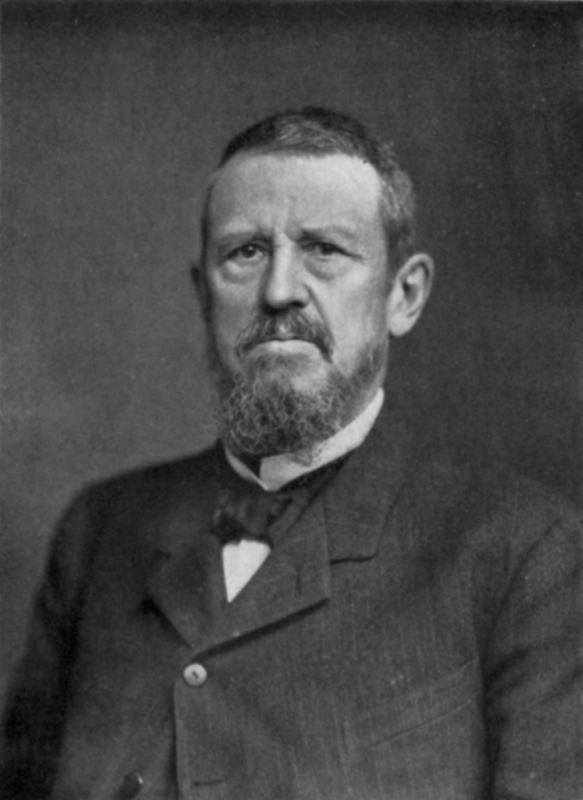
Joseph Wharton, the school's founder and namesake

Joseph Wharton, a native Philadelphian, was a leader in industrial metallurgy who built his fortune through the American Nickel Company and Bethlehem Steel Corporation. As Wharton's business grew, he recognized that business knowledge in the United States was only taught through an apprenticeship system, and such a system was not viable for creating a wider economy during the Second Industrial Revolution.

After two years of planning, Wharton in 1881 founded the Wharton School of Finance and Economy through a $100,000 initial pledge, making it the first business school established in the United States. ESCP Europe, established in 1819, and a few other business schools were established in Europe prior to Wharton's founding. The school was meant to train future leaders to conduct corporations and public organizations in a rapidly evolving industrial era. Wharton was quoted as saying that the school was meant to "instill a sense of the coming strife [in business life]: of the immense swings upward or downward that await the competent or the incompetent soldier in this modern strife."

From the founding of the school, he defined that its goal was "to provide for young men special means of training and of correct instruction in the knowledge and in the arts of modern Finance and Economy, both public and private, in order that, being well informed and free from delusions upon these important subjects, they may either serve the community skillfully as well as faithfully in offices of trust, or, remaining in private life, may prudently manage their own affairs and aid in maintaining sound financial morality: in short, to establish means for imparting a liberal education in all matters concerning Finance and Economy." The school was renamed the Wharton School of Finance and Commerce, in 1902, and formally changed its name to simply Wharton School in 1972.

=== Development ===
Early on, the Wharton School faculty was tightly connected to an influential group of businessmen, bankers, and lawyers that made up the larger Philadelphia School of Political Economy. The faculty incorporated social sciences into the Wharton curriculum, as the field of business was still under development. Albert S. Bolles, a lawyer, served as Wharton's first professor, and the school's Industrial Research Unit was established in 1921.

Wharton professor Simon Kuznets, who later won the Nobel Prize in Economics, created statistical data on national output, prices, investment, and capital stock and measured seasonability, cycles, and secular trends of these phenomena. His work laid out what became the standard procedure for measuring the gross national product and the gross domestic product, and he later led an international effort to establish the same statistical information for all national economies. Professor Lawrence Klein, who also won the Nobel Prize in Economics, developed the first econometric model of the U.S. economy, which combined economic theory with mathematics, providing another way to test theories and predict future economic trends.

Wharton professor George W. Taylor is credited with founding the academic field of study known as industrial relations. He served in several capacities in the federal government, most notably as a mediator and arbitrator. During his career, Taylor settled more than 2,000 strikes. In 1967, he helped draft the New York State civil service law that legalized collective bargaining in the state but that also banned strikes by public employees—legislation widely known today as the Taylor Law.

Wharton professor Wroe Alderson (1898–1964) is widely recognized as the most important marketing theorist of the twentieth century and the "father of modern marketing." Wharton professor Paul Green is considered to be the "father of conjoint analysis" for his discovery of the statistical tool for quantification of market research.

Wharton professor Solomon S. Huebner is known widely as "the father of insurance education." He originated the concept of "human life value," which became a standard method of calculating insurance value and need. He established the goal of professionalism in the field of insurance, developed the first collegiate-level program in insurance and chaired the Department of Insurance at Wharton, and contributed greatly to the progress of adult education in this area. Wharton professor Daniel M. McGill was widely regarded as the "dean of the pension industry," whose research contributed to shaping the modern retirement system both in the public and corporate sectors.

In 1946, after ENIAC was created at the University of Pennsylvania, Wharton created the first multidisciplinary programs in technology management with the School of Engineering and Applied Science. Wharton faculty began to work closely with AT&T, Merrill Lynch, MasterCard, Prudential Insurance, and the New York Stock Exchange in analyzing the strategic and commercial implications of information systems.

The Wharton School's first business professor was an attorney, Albert Bolles. At the time, there were no other business schools, and no business professors could be recruited elsewhere. Bolles, a lawyer by education and training, and business journalist by career seemed to be the best option for Joseph Wharton. Bolles started his career as a lawyer in Connecticut in the second half of the 19th century. After resigning from his law firm, he started pursuing a new career in business journalism and was promoted to the editor role of Bankers Magazine, a trade publication, in 1880. Upon joining the Wharton School, he began teaching business with classes on the law of governing finance and on the processes of commercial banking. Bolles' instruction in finance was influenced by his previous experience in Bankers Magazine: he stressed conservative business practices, drawing on business history as much as he could. In his classes, inflationist Congressmen were "self-interested debtors." Besides teaching, Bolles advocated for several national reforms, including the uniform banking law. Wharton historian Steven A. Sass wrote about him, "Bolles thus fulfilled Joseph Wharton's pedagogic expectations and…got the new school off to a respectable start by the spring of 1883." In 1884, the first five business students were awarded a Bachelor of Finance degree. One graduate, Shiro Shiba, returned to Japan where he would become a member of the Diet, the Japanese parliament, and another, Robert Adams Jr., later was named United States Ambassador to Brazil.

Classes in business and finance abounded at the Wharton School, but it lacked in any other areas of business interest. Edmund J. James, with a doctorate from the University of Halle in Germany, reinvigorated the school's curriculum, starting classes on political finance and administration. Later in 1885, James argued for redesigning the course of study at Wharton with elements of German higher education. He wanted to include training in banking, railroading, merchandising, manufacturing, and other similar branches, and expand the course's length to four years from the initial three. Joseph Wharton in November 1893 pledged an additional $75,000 to the school in order to implement James' ideas in the school's curriculum. A more comprehensive study plan was then rolled out. Between 1895 and 1915, James started teaching at Wharton the new fields of finance and management as they were developing in the business world. The Wharton School improved its reputation from a bunch of academic "misfits," and some of its alumni rose in the U.S. business world. During this period, the school continued to attract additional faculty members and expand its research programs.

Wharton began awarding MBA degrees in 1921. The first woman to earn an MBA at Wharton was Alma K. Ledig, in 1931. In 1942, during World War II, in the same fashion of other schools, Wharton's full-time faculty dropped dramatically from 165 to 39 by 1944. According to school historians, members of the faculty were called upon for special posts. In 1959, Wharton adopted the curriculum that is now taught in most major business schools: the program was changed with liberal arts education doubling to almost half of the curriculum. In 1974 the social sciences department, along with the rest of the university's liberal arts programs, was moved to the newly created University of Pennsylvania School of Arts and Sciences. Since then, Wharton faculty have focused exclusively on various aspects of business education.

Official historical names of the institution include the Wharton School of Finance and Economy, from 1881 to 1901, and the Wharton School of Finance and Commerce, from 1902 to 1971.

The Jay H. Baker Retailing Center at Wharton was permanently endowed by alumnus Jay H. Baker in 2010. It is an interdisciplinary industry research center which was originally established in 2002. The center brings together retail leaders, faculty, and students to discuss the opportunities and challenges of retailers. The Baker Retailing Center also hosts an annual CEO Summit in New York City.

On February 26, 2020, Erika H. James was named dean of the Wharton School, effective July 1, 2020. She is both the first woman and the first African-American to lead the business school.

In May 2024, the school announced the Wharton AI & Analytics Initiative, an investment to expand its research and teaching in artificial intelligence and data science, led by vice dean Eric Bradlow. As part of the initiative, Wharton began providing ChatGPT Enterprise licenses to full-time and executive MBA students, the first such arrangement between a business school and OpenAI.

== Campus ==
=== Philadelphia campus ===
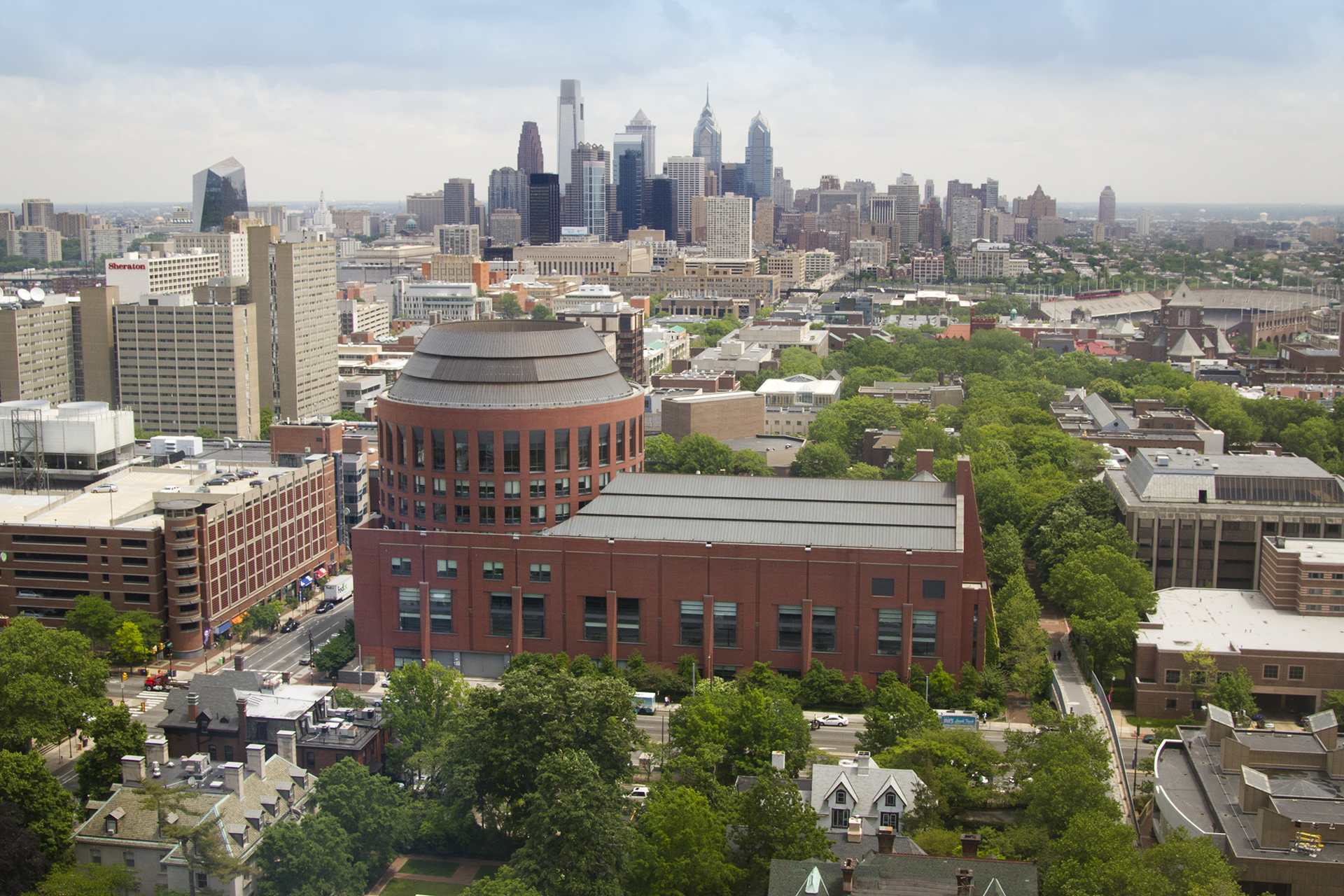
Huntsman Hall, the Wharton School's main building

The Philadelphia campus of the Wharton School has four primary buildings, Jon M. Huntsman Hall, Steinberg Hall-Dietrich Hall, Vance Hall, and Lauder-Fischer Hall. In addition, the Steinberg Conference Center houses the Aresty Institute of Executive Education.

Jon M. Huntsman Hall is the Wharton School's main building. The building is a 324,000-square-foot structure with 48 seminar and lecture halls, 57 group study rooms, and several auditoriums and conference rooms. It was constructed through a donation from Wharton alumnus Jon M. Huntsman. It also has a 4,000-square-foot forum, as well as a colloquium space on the top floor.

Steinberg Hall-Dietrich Hall is a joint 180,000-square-foot structure comprising two adjacent halls. It was built in 1952 and expanded in 1983 through a donation from Wharton alumnus Saul Steinberg, and houses the offices of several academic departments at the Wharton School. It also contains lecture halls, conference rooms and common areas for faculty and students.

Dinan Hall is a 107,000-square-foot structure built in 1972 to house Wharton's graduate programs, administrative offices, lecture halls, and meeting areas.

Lauder-Fischer Hall houses the Joseph H. Lauder Institute for Management and International Studies, and focuses mainly on international business teaching and research initiatives. The Lauder Institute was founded in 1983 by Wharton alumni Leonard Lauder and Ronald Lauder.

In 2014, the Wharton School launched the Student Life Space in Philadelphia's central business district. It is a 20,000-square-foot space with conference rooms, meeting rooms and over 20 group study rooms. It also serves as an incubator space for startup companies.

In 2018, it was announced that a new 70,000-square-foot campus building for student entrepreneurship would be constructed, following a $25 million donation from the hedge fund manager and philanthropist Nicolai Tangen. The building is located at 40th and Sansom Streets, and opened in 2020. The building currently houses the school's Venture Lab--a hub for students interested in becoming involved with startups.

=== San Francisco campus ===
In 2001, Wharton launched a satellite campus in San Francisco, California. The Bay Area campus was created to capitalize on the growing start-up culture and related financing sector of Silicon Valley. It serves as a hub on the West Coast for its students and alumni. As of 2012, the campus is open to executive MBA students and to full-time MBA students, who can decide to spend the spring semester of first year, or fall or spring semesters of second year of the MBA program in San Francisco in the Semester in San Francisco Program. For the full-time MBAs, the Semester in San Francisco Program focuses on entrepreneurship, technology, and venture capital.

== Undergraduate program ==
=== Admissions process ===
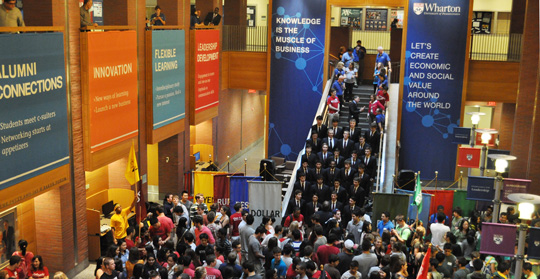
Wharton undergraduate students with cohort banners

Prospective Wharton candidates apply in their senior year of high school either through the early decision (ED) process or regular decision (RD) process. Unlike many other undergraduate business programs where students transfer in after their freshman or second year (University of Virginia's McIntire, Emory's Goizueta), Wharton applicants apply specifically for Wharton during their senior year of high school. These candidates are then grouped with a pool of applicants separate from those applying to the University of Pennsylvania's College of Arts and Sciences (CAS), School of Engineering and Applied Science (SEAS), or School of Nursing. Each of the other three schools also forms its own separate pool of applicants.

The legacy status of applicants, defined as having a parent or another direct relative who attended the same academic institution, may be considered in the admissions process. This correlation has been observed in a number of empirical studies conducted on the nation's most elite schools, with a particular focus on Ivy League universities. Leading universities in the United States cite stronger alumni connections and continued support as the primary reasons for this practice.

=== Graduation and employment ===
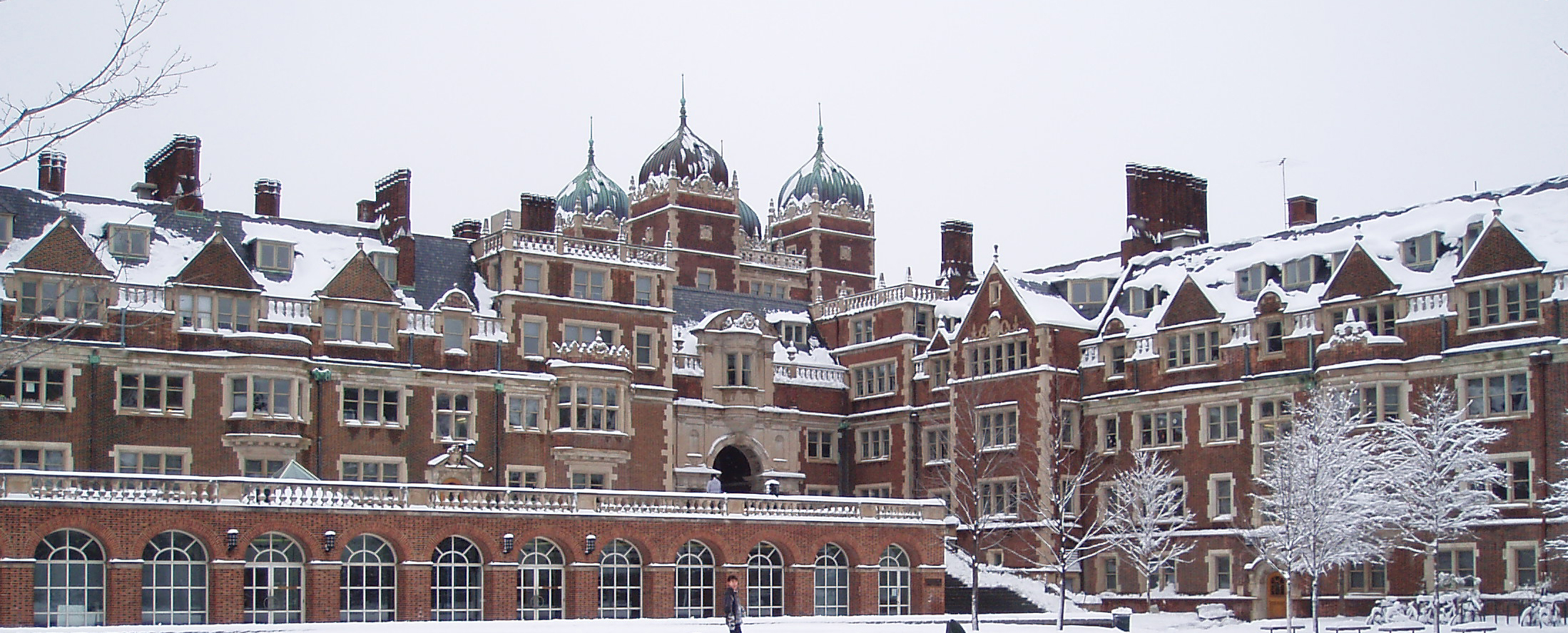
Quadrangle at the University of Pennsylvania

Wharton undergraduate students are required to graduate with a B.S. in economics with at least 1 of 21 current concentrations. Concentrations range from finance and accounting to lesser-known studies such as business analytics and Social Impact & Responsibility. Obtaining a concentration requires a student to take four classes outside of what is required in the core curriculum. Policy has recently changed such that Wharton students can graduate with a maximum of two concentrations rather than three. In the 2015–16 school year, 334 employers participated in the on-campus recruiting process; each student received an average of 7.6 first-round interviews and 1.8 job offers. About 48% of Wharton's typical undergraduate class of 650 students go into different services in the financial field, with the top sectors being investment banking, investment management, and private equity. The next most common industry after finance is management consulting, which hires approximately 22% of the students, while a significant number of students enter marketing, sales, and the technology industry, particularly in Silicon Valley.

For the Class of 2025, Wharton undergraduate students reported a median first-year base compensation of $110,000.

== Graduate programs ==
=== MBA program ===
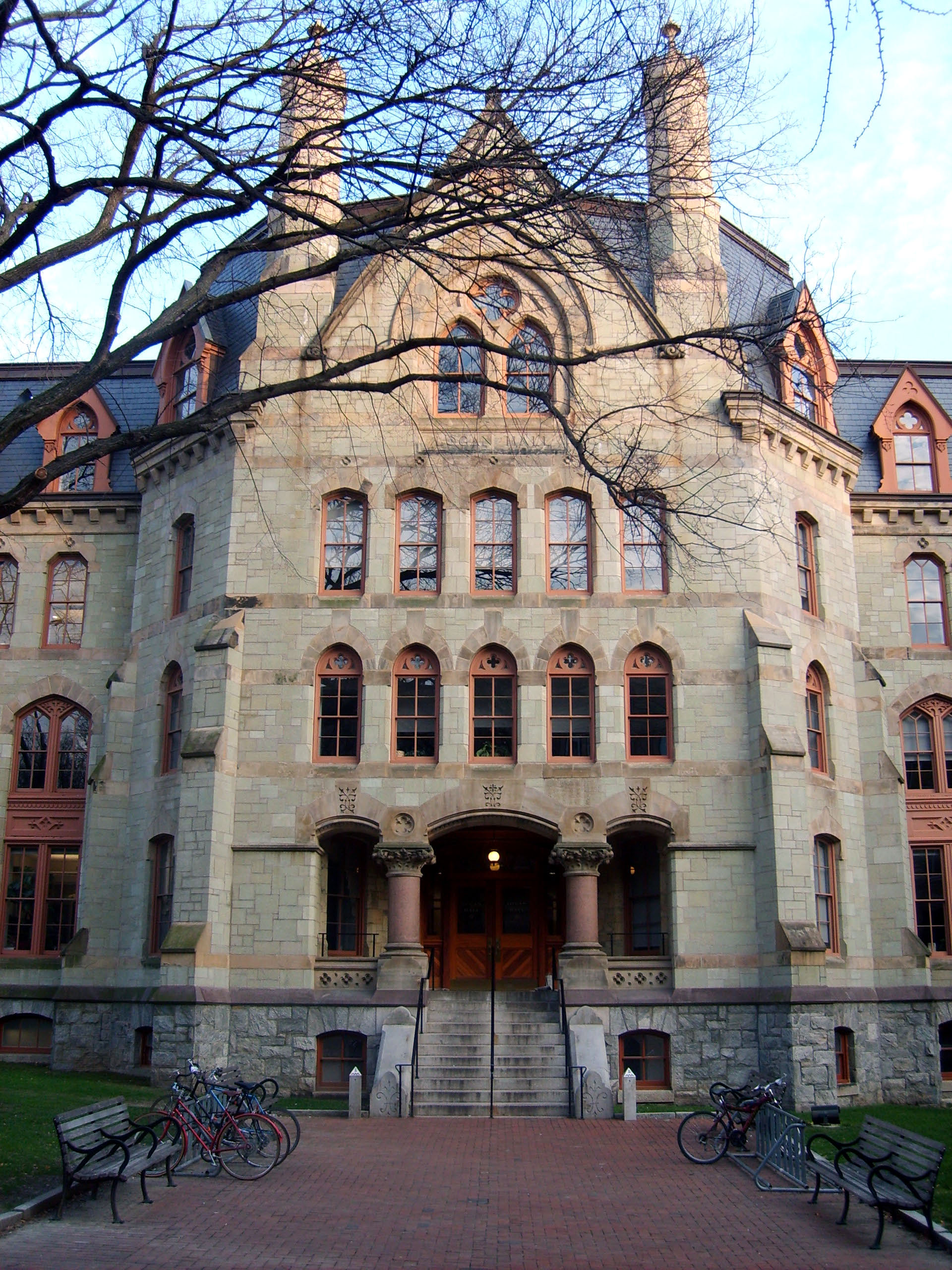
Cohen Hall served as the previous home of the Wharton School.

The school offers two paths, an MBA for full-time students and an MBA for executives. Students can elect to pursue double majors or individualized majors. During their first year, all students pursue a required core curriculum that covers traditional management disciplines—finance, marketing, statistics, and strategy—as well as the leadership, ethics, and communication skills needed at senior levels of management. Students pick electives in the second year.

Wharton MBA students may pursue a dual degree with the Lauder Institute, Johns Hopkins University's Paul H. Nitze School of Advanced International Studies (SAIS), Harvard Kennedy School at Harvard University, or with one of the graduate schools at the University of Pennsylvania.

MBA students from the Class of 2025 earn an average first-year salary and guaranteed compensation of $185,000. Additionally, the class reported a median sign-on bonus of $30,000 and a median guaranteed bonus of $25,357. The MBA program annually receives around 7,300 applications for the 850 places in the class.

Wharton co-sponsored the Executive Master's in Technology Management Program (EMTM) with the University of Pennsylvania School of Engineering and Applied Science. Graduates received a Master of Science in engineering (MSE) in the management of technology from the School of Engineering and Applied Science. The EMTM program ended in August 2014.

Wharton is also part of the Wharton-INSEAD Alliance. MBA students from each program can spend one period of study at the partner school, allowing Wharton students access to the INSEAD campuses in both Fontainebleau and Singapore. Students who are interested in careers in technology industries also regularly study at Wharton's San Francisco campus.

=== Doctoral programs ===
Wharton offers doctor of philosophy degrees in finance, applied economics, management, and other business fields (as opposed to some schools, which grant DBAs). It takes approximately four to six years to complete the doctoral program. Wharton also offers a dual master's degree in statistics and data science for students enrolled in other doctoral programs at the university.

Students who are interested in careers in technology industries also regularly study at Wharton's San Francisco campus.

== Executive education ==
Business school rankings

United States
- QS MBA: 4
- Financial Times MBA: 2
- Bloomberg MBA: 2
- USNWR MBA: 2
- USNWR Undergraduate: 1
- THE Business: 6

Global
- QS MBA: 4
- Financial Times MBA: 3
- THE Business: 10

The Wharton School pioneered so-called 'executive education' (open-admissions course enrichment for professionals) and operates the Aresty Institute of Executive Education, commonly known as "Wharton Executive Education", a center for continuing business education for senior executives. The institute is named in honor of brothers and Wharton alumni Joseph Aresty, president and majority owner of Alfred Dunner, and Julian Aresty, president of SP Dunham Department Stores, who together endowed the Aresty Institute of Executive Education in 1987.

Wharton Executive Education offers programs for executives in areas such as artificial intelligence and analytics, finance, marketing, strategy, and innovation. Each year, more than 10,000 professionals worldwide attend Wharton Executive Education programs in classes taught by full-time Wharton faculty.

Wharton offers more than 50 open enrollment programs for individuals on campuses in Philadelphia, San Francisco, and Beijing, China. Wharton also offers three long-duration open-enrollment programs that confer alumni status upon successful completion. These programs are the Advanced Finance Program, Advanced Management Program, and the General Management Program. Wharton also offers the Owner/President/CEO Program (OPC), a three-module, in-person program for owners and senior executives. Some programs eligible for alumni status, Wharton Programs for Working Professionals (WPWP), for example, are not offered anymore. However, graduates of these programs are still qualified for "Alumni, Non-Degreed" status by Penn.

In addition to a large portfolio of open-enrollment programs for individuals, Wharton Executive Education also offers customized programs for organizations. Custom program topic areas include Finance and Value Creation, Leadership Development, Marketing and Sales, and Strategy and Innovation. Industry areas of expertise include Consumer Products, Retail, Energy, Transportation, Financial Services, Health Care, Pharmaceuticals, Manufacturing and Industrials, Professional Services, Technology and Communications.

== Wharton online ==
Through its online division, Wharton offers massive open online courses on Coursera with specializations in business and financial modeling, business analytics, entrepreneurship, FinTech and business foundations. Wharton Online also offers a Leadership and Management Certificate and a Business Analytics Certificate. The division is accredited by the International Association for Continuing Education and Training (IACET); it was the first online business school to be accredited by this organization.

The COVID-19 pandemic meant a rapid shift towards online teaching, transforming some of the classroom courses into online courses. For years there has been a strong investment in online education, so the school has been able to adapt well to the new circumstances, according to the Financial Times analysis on the adaptation of business schools to COVID-19.

== Notable people ==
=== Alumni ===
Wharton School alumni include Tesla/SpaceX/Twitter CEO Elon Musk, U.S. president Donald Trump and investor Warren Buffett. Other alumni include the current and former CEOs of numerous Fortune 500 companies, including Alphabet Inc., Boeing, Comcast, General Electric, H-E-B, Johnson & Johnson, Oracle, Pfizer and PepsiCo.

== See also ==
- List of business schools in the United States
- List of Ivy League business schools
- List of United States business school rankings
- Outline of organizational theory
