= Erika H. James =

American academic

- Born: Bermuda
- Title: Dean of the Wharton School of the University of Pennsylvania

Academic background
- Education: Pomona College (BA); University of Michigan (MA, PhD)

Erika H. James is an American academic and businesswoman. She is the dean of the Wharton School of the University of Pennsylvania. She is both the first woman and the first Black person to lead the business school. James is known for her crisis leadership and workplace diversity research. James was named dean of the school in February 2020 and formally began on July 1.

== Early life and education ==
Born in Bermuda, James moved to the United States as a child. She lived in St. Louis, Missouri, as well as in Texas, where she graduated from high school. James' mother was an educator. Her stepfather was clinical psychologist Marshall Rosenberg, who influenced her choice to study psychology at Pomona College.

James received a Bachelor of Arts with a major in psychology from Pomona College in Claremont, California in 1991. She received a Master of Arts and a Doctor of Philosophy in the field of organizational psychology from the University of Michigan in 1995.

== Career ==
James' research included work on workplace diversity and managing through a crisis. During her graduate education, James took time away from school to work for American Express.

James has said that she did not expect to work in academia after graduation, but was influenced by an academic advisor to pursue a university job. Following graduation, James turned down a number of consulting offers to become an assistant professor at Tulane University's Freeman School of Business and a visiting professor at Harvard Business School.

James was the president and owner of the Crisis Management Institute, which reported on business crises and provided crisis management training courses for firms and organizations.

In 2001, James joined the faculty at the University of Virginia Darden School of Business, where she also led the creation of the role of Associate Dean of Diversity. She was promoted to Senior Associate Dean for Executive Education in 2012. As Senior Associate Dean at Darden, James introduced the Women's Leadership Program.

In 2014, James was named the John H. Harland Dean of Emory University's Goizueta Business School. James was the first African-American woman to be named dean in Emory's history. While she was dean of the Goizueta Business School, the Goizueta faculty body grew by 25%. That same year, James was included in the Ebony magazine Power 100 list of the "world's most inspiring African Americans."

In 2019, James was awarded the Earl Hill Jr. Faculty Achievement and Diversity Leadership Award by the Consortium for Graduate Study in Management.

James was elected to the board of directors of financial services company Morgan Stanley in November 2021. In 2022, she was named one of Barron's 100 Most Influential Women in Finance.

James is coauthor, with Simmons University President Lynn Perry Wooten, of The Prepared Leader: Emerge from Any Crisis More Resilient Than Before (Wharton School Press, 2022).
