= Cornell Policy Review =

- Discipline: Public policy
- Language: English

Publication details
- Former name: The Current
- Publisher: Cornell Institute for Public Affairs (United States)
- Frequency: Rolling

Standard abbreviations
- ISO 4: Cornell Policy Rev.

Indexing
- ISSN: 1934-0486 (print); 1934-0494 (web)
- OCLC no.: 987587574

Links
- Journal homepage

The Cornell Policy Review is an online academic journal published by the Cornell Institute for Public Affairs. It is verified by the Network of Schools of Public Policy, Affairs, and Administration and edited and run by the program's students. It was originally published biannually, but switched to a rolling online publication in the 2015–16 academic year. Formerly known as The Current, the journal publishes articles, commentaries, and interviews relating to public policy.
