= Laura Tach =

American professor

Laura Tach is an American professor of policy analysis and management and sociology at Cornell University. She is the co-director with Rachel Dunifon of Cornell Project 2Gen, a research initiative supporting disadvantaged caregivers and children. In collaboration with the Cornell Cooperative Extension of Tompkins County, Tach studies the relationship between opioid abuse and child maltreatment. The study was funded by a multi-year grant from the William T. Grant Foundation. Tach has studied the relationship between "microenvironments", or the neighborhood blocks where one resides, affect educational success.

She earned a PhD at Harvard University.

== Selected publications ==
- McLanahan, Sara; Tach, Laura; Schneider, Daniel (30 July 2013). "The Causal Effects of Father Absence". Annual Review of Sociology. 39 (1): 399–427. doi:10.1146/annurev-soc-071312-145704. PMC 3904543. PMID 24489431.
- Laura Tach; Ronald Mincy; Kathryn Edin (2010). "Parenting as a "Package Deal": Relationships, Fertility, and Nonresident Father Involvement Among Unmarried Parents". Demography. 47 (1): 181–204. doi:10.1353/dem.0.0096. PMC 3000012. PMID 20355690.
- Odgers, Candice L.; Moffitt, Terrie E.; Tach, Laura M.; Sampson, Robert J.; Taylor, Alan; Matthews, Charlotte L.; Caspi, Avshalom (2009). "The protective effects of neighborhood collective efficacy on British children growing up in deprivation: A developmental analysis". Developmental Psychology. 45 (4): 942–957. doi:10.1037/a0016162. hdl:2027.42/151342. PMC 4212822. PMID 19586172.
- Tach, Laura Marie; Farkas, George (December 2006). "Learning-related behaviors, cognitive skills, and ability grouping when schooling begins". Social Science Research. 35 (4): 1048–1079. doi:10.1016/j.ssresearch.2005.08.001.
