= Richard Geddes (academic) =

R. Richard Geddes
- Occupations: Professor, Cornell University
- Board member of: Hyperloop Advanced Research Partnership

Academic background
- Education: Towson State University (BS); University of Chicago (MA, PhD)

Academic work
- Discipline: Economist
- Sub-discipline: Transportation infrastructure
- Main interests: Public-private partnerships, rail, Postal Service

R. Richard Geddes is an American academic specializing in infrastructure policy. He is a professor of policy analysis and management at Cornell University, where he is director of its infrastructure program.

Geddes is an expert in public–private partnerships. He is a visiting scholar at the American Enterprise Institute.

== Education ==
Geddes was educated at Towson State University (BS 1984) and the University of Chicago (MA 1987, PhD 1991).

== Public Policy ==
Geddes is a recognized authority on transportation issues, being interviewed for NPR's On Point. He writes as well for the Wall Street Journal.

He has testified before House and Senate Committees ten times since 2008, most frequently about federal spending on railroads and the Postal Service.

Geddes has observed that public-private partnerships are unlikely to take hold in the United States, as long as less risky municipal bond funding for projects is common.

== Selected publications ==
- Richard Geddes; Benjamin Wagner (2017). "Do State Public-Private Partnership Enabling Laws Increase Investment in Transportation Infrastructure?" (PDF). Cornell University. Archived from the original (PDF) on October 31, 2017.
- Richard Geddes, R. (2005). Policy Watch: Reform of the U.S. Postal Service. Journal of Economic Perspectives. 19. 217–232. doi:10.1257/089533005774357879.
- Geddes, Rick; Lueck, Dean; Tennyson, Sharon (2012). "Human Capital Accumulation and the Expansion of Women's Economic Rights". The Journal of Law and Economics. 55 (4): 839–867. doi:10.1086/666086. ISSN 0022-2186. S2CID 155008483. SSRN 1117650.
- Richard R. Geddes (16 February 2011). The Road to Renewal: Private Investment in the U.S. Transportation Infrastructure. Government Institutes. ISBN 978-0-8447-4348-6.
