= Colleen Barry =

American health policy scholar and professor

Colleen L. Barry
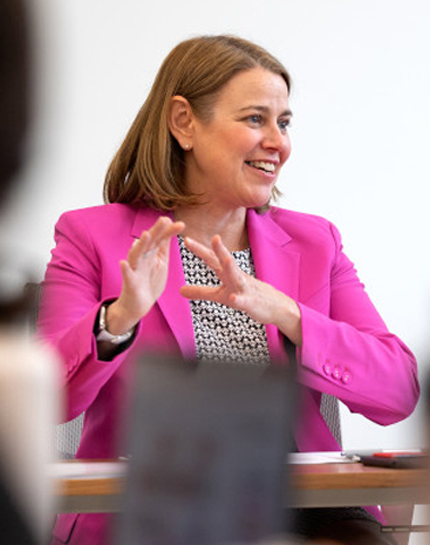
- Education: Drew University
- Alma mater: John F. Kennedy School of Government
- Occupation: Dean

Colleen L. Barry is an American researcher and educator in the areas of mental health and addiction policy and policy communication. She is the inaugural dean of the Cornell Jeb E. Brooks School of Public Policy at Cornell University.

== Education ==
Barry received her Ph.D. in health policy from Harvard University in 2004, her Master of Public Policy from the John F. Kennedy School of Government at Harvard University in 1999, and graduated summa cum laude with a bachelor's degree in political science and Russian language and literature from Drew University in 1992.

== Career ==
Barry formerly was the Fred and Julie Soper Professor and Chair of the Department of Health Policy and Management at the Johns Hopkins Bloomberg School of Public Health. Prior to joining Johns Hopkins, Barry was a faculty member at the Yale University School of Public Health from October 2004. She began her career in government and legislative affairs in Washington, D.C., and worked as a state health policy analyst in Massachusetts. Her tenure at Cornell University began on 15 September 2021.

== Service ==
Barry is an elected member of the National Academy of Medicine and the National Academy of Social Insurance. While at Johns Hopkins, she was founding director of the Center for Mental Health and Addiction Policy and the Johns Hopkins StigmaLab. She co-chaired the Forum on Mental Health and Substance Use Disorders of the National Academies of Sciences, Engineering and Medicine and has served as a board member and vice president for the Association of Public Policy and Management. She serves as Vice Chair of the Board of Directors of Sandy Hook Promise, an organization that seeks to protect children from gun violence.

== Research ==
Barry's research focuses on how health and social policies can affect a range of outcomes for individuals with mental illness and substance use and communities at risk for violence. She also studies how communication strategies can increase public support for evidence-based policies to improve the health and wellbeing of people with mental illness and substance use disorders and reduce stigma. She directed the National Institute of Mental Health funded pre- and post-doctoral mental health services and systems training program at Johns Hopkins. She has served as Principal Investigator of numerous large-scale research studies funded by the National Institutes of Health and health-oriented foundations.

In addition, Barry led major public opinion survey research projects including the bi-annual Johns Hopkins National Gun Policy Tracking Survey and the longitudinal Johns Hopkins COVID-19 Civic Life and Public Health Survey cohort study. Examples of her contributions include public opinion research in the wake of the Sandy Hook Elementary School shooting and research to build an evidence base for public policies to combat the opioid crisis in the U.S.

Most recently, Barry was the senior author of a study on public opinion concerning the harassment of public health officials. She is co-principal investigator on the 2022 Collaborative Midterm Survey funded by the National Science Foundation.

Barry has authored more than 240 peer-reviewed publications on a range of health policy topics in top policy and medical journals.
