= Rachel Beatty Riedl =

Political scientist

Rachel Beatty Riedl is a political scientist specializing in democracy and authoritarianism, especially in Africa. She is a professor of Politics at the Department of Government and in the Brooks School of Public Policy and the Peggy J. Koenig '78 Director of the Center on Democracy at Cornell University.

== Education ==
Riedl earned a B.A. in International Relations from the University of Wisconsin-Madison. Subsequently, she obtained an M.A. and Ph.D. in political science from Princeton University.

== Career ==
After an assistant and associate professorship in the Department of Political Science at Northwestern University, Riedl became a professor at Cornell University's Department of Government. She acted as the Director of the Einaudi Center at Cornell University from 2019 to 2024. Moreover, she serves on the advisory board of the Kellogg Institute for International Studies at the University of Notre Dame.

== Research ==
Riedl's research focuses on democracy and authoritarianism, including questions of participation, political parties, and governance. Her first book, Authoritarian origins of democratic party systems in Africa, was published in 2014 by Cambridge University Press.

== Awards ==
- Best Book Award, African Politics Conference Group, American Political Science Association (APSA)
- Best Book Award Honorable Mention, Democracy and Autocracy section, American Political Science Association (APSA)
