= Sarah Kreps =

American political scientist and analyst

Sarah E. Kreps
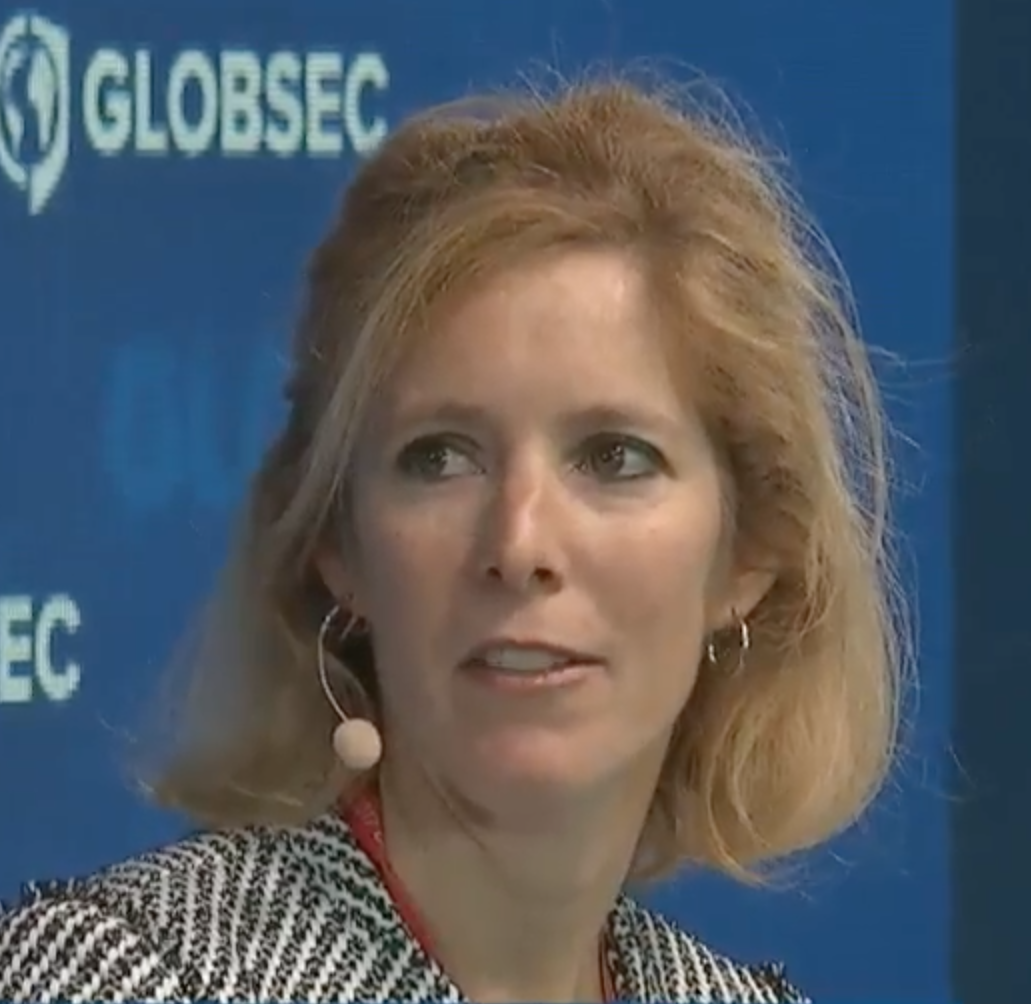
- Kreps speaking at GLOBSEC
- Born: May 10, 1976 (age 50); Alexandria, Virginia, U.S.
- Occupations: Political scientist, professor, author
- Awards: Choice Outstanding Academic Title (2015); Cornell Community-Engaged Practice and Innovation Award (2023); Cornell Veterans Continuation of Service Award (2024)

Academic background
- Education: Harvard University (BA); University of Oxford (MSc); Georgetown University (PhD)

Academic work
- Discipline: Political science
- Sub-discipline: International relations, security studies, technology policy
- Institutions: Cornell University
- Main interests: Emerging technology, national security, international politics, drone warfare, artificial intelligence, and democratic accountability
- Notable works: Drone Warfare; Drones: What Everyone Needs to Know; Taxing Wars; Social Media and International Relations
- Website: government.cornell.edu/sarah-kreps

Sarah E. Kreps (born May 10, 1976) is an American political scientist, author, and former United States Air Force officer whose research focuses on the relationship between emerging technology, international politics, and national security. She is the John L. Wetherill Professor in the Department of Government at Cornell University, an adjunct professor at Cornell Law School, and director of the Tech Policy Institute in the Cornell Jeb E. Brooks School of Public Policy.

Kreps is also a nonresident senior fellow in the Foreign Policy program at the Brookings Institution, a senior fellow at the Bitcoin Policy Institute, and a life member of the Council on Foreign Relations. Her scholarship has addressed unmanned aerial vehicles, military intervention, war finance, social media, artificial intelligence, cybersecurity, public opinion, semiconductor supply chains, and democratic accountability.

== Early life and education ==
Kreps earned a Bachelor of Arts in environmental science and public policy, magna cum laude, from Harvard University in 1998. She received a Master of Science in environmental change and management, with distinction, from the University of Oxford in 1999 and a PhD in government from Georgetown University in 2007. Her doctoral fields were international relations and security studies.

== Military and professional career ==
Kreps served as an active-duty officer in the United States Air Force from 1999 to 2003. She worked as an acquisition and procurement officer on advanced surveillance technology and as a foreign area officer specializing in European and Sub-Saharan African affairs.

From 2003 to 2004, she worked as a consultant on coalition and network-centric operations for the British Ministry of Defence and NATO. From 2003 to 2005, she worked at the National Reconnaissance Office, where she conducted analysis related to technological requirements for space-based intelligence. She subsequently served in the Air Force Reserve, working on political-military affairs and foreign military sales for Europe in the Office of the Secretary of the Air Force for International Affairs.

Kreps has also worked as a consultant on forecasting projects for the United States Department of State and the United States Department of Homeland Security. In 2008, she contributed to a handbook on post-conflict reconstruction and stability operations for the United States Institute of Peace.

== Academic career ==
Kreps joined Cornell University's Department of Government as an assistant professor in 2008. She became an associate professor in 2014 and a full professor in 2019. In 2020, she was appointed the John L. Wetherill Professor of Government. She served as chair of Cornell's Department of Government from 2021 to 2022.

In 2020, Kreps became director of Cornell's Tech Policy Lab. In 2022, she became director of the Tech Policy Institute in the Cornell Brooks School of Public Policy. The institute conducts research on the political and public-policy consequences of emerging technologies, including their effects on national security, democracy, public health, and financial systems.

Kreps became a nonresident senior fellow at the Brookings Institution in 2020. Her previous fellowships and academic affiliations have included the Belfer Center for Science and International Affairs at Harvard Kennedy School, the Miller Center of Public Affairs at the University of Virginia, the Council on Foreign Relations, the Hoover Institution, and the Modern War Institute at the United States Military Academy. She was a Stanton Nuclear Security Fellow at the Council on Foreign Relations from 2013 to 2014 and an adjunct scholar at the Modern War Institute from 2017 to 2018.

She is a faculty fellow in Cornell's Milstein Program in Technology and Humanity and has been affiliated with the Roper Center for Public Opinion Research and Cornell's Institute of Politics and Global Affairs.

== Research ==
=== Military intervention and drone warfare ===
Kreps's early research examined military coalitions and the circumstances in which the United States acts multilaterally. Her first book, Coalitions of Convenience: United States Military Interventions after the Cold War, analyzed variation in the composition and durability of military coalitions formed after the end of the Cold War.

She subsequently studied the military, legal, ethical, and political implications of remotely piloted aircraft. In Drone Warfare, written with philosopher John Kaag, Kreps examined the development of military drone programs, their relationship to public accountability, and proposals for the international regulation of drone warfare. The book was named a 2015 Choice Outstanding Academic Title.

Kreps expanded this work in Drones: What Everyone Needs to Know, which surveys the history, technology, strategic uses, legal status, and political consequences of drones.

=== War finance and democratic accountability ===
In Taxing Wars: The American Way of War Finance and the Decline of Democracy, Kreps examined changes in the way the United States finances military conflicts. She argued that the declining use of wartime taxation and greater reliance on borrowing have weakened the connection between military action and the financial sacrifices experienced by the public, thereby reducing incentives for public scrutiny of war.

Kreps and political scientist Douglas L. Kriner later edited Checking the Costs of War: Sources of Accountability in Post-9/11 US Foreign Policy. The volume examines how Congress, public opinion, political parties, government agencies, and other domestic institutions constrain—or fail to constrain—presidential uses of military power.

=== Technology and politics ===
Kreps's later research has focused increasingly on emerging technologies, including artificial intelligence, social media, cybersecurity, digital currencies, and semiconductor supply chains. Her book Social Media and International Relations examines how social-media platforms affect diplomacy, interstate competition, authoritarian governance, foreign interference, and political communication. The book argues that social media can give authoritarian governments advantages in regime preservation and in efforts to influence political discourse within democratic states.

Kreps has conducted experimental research on public trust in artificial intelligence, AI-generated political communication, government responsiveness, online misinformation, automated decision systems, and public attitudes toward surveillance following cyberattacks.

She has also participated in interdisciplinary research concerning public-health communication and vaccine acceptance during the COVID-19 pandemic.

In 2024, Kreps became a co-principal investigator on a United States Department of Defense-supported project studying threats to semiconductor supply chains. She has also participated in research concerning the relationship between digital currencies and financial freedom.

== Awards and honors ==
- 2015 – Choice Outstanding Academic Title for Drone Warfare, shared with John Kaag.
- 2023 – Community-Engaged Practice and Innovation Award, Cornell University David M. Einhorn Center for Community Engagement.
- 2024 – Veterans Colleague Network Group Continuation of Service Award, Cornell University, recognizing her work supporting student veterans.

== Selected bibliography ==
=== Books ===
- Kreps, Sarah E. (2011). Coalitions of Convenience: United States Military Interventions after the Cold War. Oxford University Press. ISBN 978-0-19-975380-2.
- Kaag, John; Kreps, Sarah (2014). Drone Warfare. Polity. ISBN 978-0-7456-8099-6.
- Kreps, Sarah E. (2016). Drones: What Everyone Needs to Know. Oxford University Press. ISBN 978-0-19-023535-2.
- Kreps, Sarah E. (2018). Taxing Wars: The American Way of War Finance and the Decline of Democracy. Oxford University Press. ISBN 978-0-19-086530-6.
- Kreps, Sarah (2020). Social Media and International Relations. Cambridge University Press. ISBN 978-1-108-81692-2.
- Pevehouse, Jon C. W.; Goldstein, Joshua S.; Kreps, Sarah E.; Mansfield, Edward D. (2025). International Relations (13th ed.). Pearson. ISBN 978-0-13-690160-0.
- Kreps, Sarah E.; Kriner, Douglas L., eds. (2026). Checking the Costs of War: Sources of Accountability in Post-9/11 US Foreign Policy. University of Chicago Press. ISBN 978-0-226-83955-4.
- Kreps, Sarah E. (2026). Harnessing Disruption: Building the Tech Future without Breaking Society. Oxford University Press. ISBN 978-0-19-780376-9.

=== Selected articles ===
- Kreps, Sarah E.; Wallace, Geoffrey P. R. (2016). "International law, military effectiveness, and public support for drone strikes". Journal of Peace Research. 53 (6): 830–844. doi:10.1177/0022343316657405. S2CID 147718139.
- Kreps, Sarah; McCain, Miles; Brundage, Miles (2022). "All the News That's Fit to Fabricate: AI-Generated Text as a Tool of Media Misinformation". Journal of Experimental Political Science. 9 (1): 104–117. doi:10.1017/XPS.2020.37. S2CID 225091608.
- Kreps, Sarah; Prasad, Sandip; Brownstein, John S.; Hswen, Yulin; Garibaldi, Brian T.; Zhang, Brian; Kriner, Douglas L. (2020). "Factors associated with US adults' likelihood of accepting COVID-19 vaccination". JAMA Network Open. 3 (10): e2025594. doi:10.1001/jamanetworkopen.2020.25594. PMC 7576409. PMID 33079199.
- Kreps, Sarah E.; Kriner, Douglas L. (2020). "Model uncertainty, political contestation, and public trust in science: Evidence from the COVID-19 pandemic". Science Advances. 6 (43) eabd4563. Bibcode:2020SciA....6.4563K. doi:10.1126/sciadv.abd4563. PMC 7582200. PMID 33115734.
- Rao, Adi; George, Julie; Lushenko, Paul; Kreps, Sarah (2023). "Exploring the artificial intelligence "trust paradox": Evidence from a survey experiment in the United States". PLOS ONE. 18 (11) e0293554. doi:10.1371/journal.pone.0293554. PMC 10636351. PMID 37948493.
