= Catherine Kling =

American economist

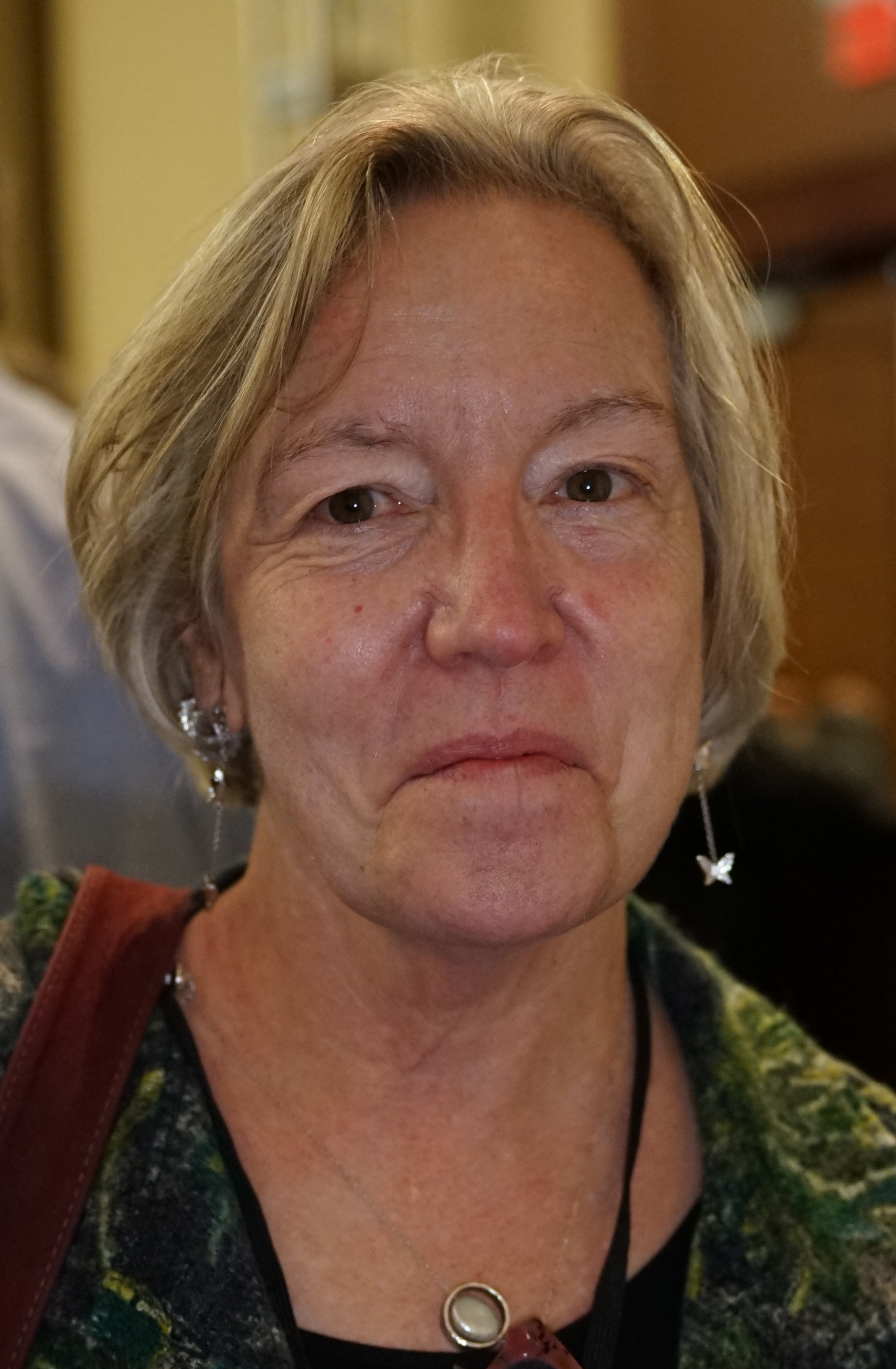
- Kling at ASSA 2026
- Born: August 19, 1960 (age 66)

Academic background
- Education: University of Iowa (BA); University of Maryland, College Park (PhD)

Academic work
- Discipline: Environmental economics, Agricultural economics
- Institutions: Cornell University; Iowa State University
- Notable ideas: Water quality modeling, Valuation of ecosystem services
- Awards: Member of the National Academy of Sciences (2015); Fellow of the American Agricultural Economics Association
- Website: dyson.cornell.edu/faculty-research/faculty/ck534/

Catherine L. Kling (born 1960) is an American economist, currently a Tisch University Professor in the Dyson School of Applied Economics and Management and Faculty Director at the Atkinson Center for a Sustainable Future at Cornell University. Her research focuses on water, ecosystems, carbon, agriculture, and the value of environmental amenities. In 2015, Kling was elected to the United States National Academy of Sciences. Kling has conducted research in the areas of environmental policy design and the valuation of environmental goods.

Until July 2018, Kling was the Charles F. Curtiss Distinguished Professor in Agriculture and Life Sciences at Iowa State University.

Additionally, she is a chair of the Water Science and Technology Board of the National Academy of Sciences as well as serving president of the Association of Environmental and Resource Economists.

Kling has published almost 100 journal articles and book chapters. She is also the editor of the Review of Environmental Economics and Policy.

On March 27, 2025, she delivered the annual lecture for the Center for Environmental and Resource Economic Policy (CEnREP) at North Carolina State University. The talk was titled “The Social Cost of Water Pollution" and focused on the economic consequences of water pollution from agricultural practices.
