= List of Ivy League medical schools =

This list of Ivy League medical schools outlines the seven universities of the Ivy League that host a medical school; only one Ivy League university, Princeton University, does not have a medical school. All Ivy League medical schools are located in the Northeastern United States and are privately owned and controlled.

== Medical schools ==
At two universities, Dartmouth College and the University of Pennsylvania, medical instruction takes place on a contiguous campus shared with undergraduate students. The medical schools of Brown University, Columbia University, Harvard University, and Yale University are located on independent campuses within the same metropolitan area as their parent institutions' primary campuses. Cornell University's school of medicine is located in New York City, at a distance from the university's main campus in Ithaca.

School name	Parent institution	Image	Founded	Location	Distance from main campus	Degrees offered
Perelman School of Medicine	University of Pennsylvania		1765	Philadelphia, PA	N/A	MD, DMD, PhD, MPH, MSCE, MTR
Vagelos College of Physicians and Surgeons	Columbia University		1767	New York, NY	2.5 mi (4.0 km)	MD, DDS, PhD, DPT
Harvard Medical School	Harvard University		1782	Boston, MA	4 mi (6.4 km)	MD, DMD, PhD
Geisel School of Medicine	Dartmouth College		1797, 1970 (Note: Dartmouth's School of Medicine did not award M.D. degrees between 1914 and 1970.)	Hanover, NH	N/A	MD, PhD, MSc, MPH, MHCDS (Note: Master of Health Care Delivery Science)
Yale School of Medicine	Yale University		1810 (Note: Medical instruction began in 1813)	New Haven, CT	1 mi (1.6 km)	MD, PhD, MSc, PA
Alpert Medical School	Brown University		1811, 1972 (Note: Medical instruction was suspended in 1827. Brown re-established a medical program in 1972.)	Providence, RI	0.5 mi (0.80 km)	MD, PhD, MSc
Weill Cornell Medicine	Cornell University		1898	New York, NY	230 mi (370 km)	MD, PhD, MSc, MSHS PA (Note: Master of Science in Health Sciences for Physician Assistants)

== Primary affiliated teaching hospitals ==
The Ivy League medical schools have historically been affiliated with many of the most renowned medical centers in the nation. Most of the schools have multiple primary teaching affiliates, although only the most notable ones are listed on this page. Two of the medical schools, Columbia and Cornell, share a medical campus at NewYork-Presbyterian Hospital, albeit in separate medical centers (Irving and Weill, respectively).

University	Primary teaching hospitals	City	Staffed beds	US News ranking
University of Pennsylvania	Hospital of the University of Pennsylvania	Philadelphia	839	1st in Pennsylvania
Columbia	NewYork-Presbyterian Hospital (Columbia University Irving Medical Center)	New York City	2,696	1st in New York
Harvard	Massachusetts General Hospital	Boston	1,019	1st in Massachusetts
Harvard	Brigham & Women's Hospital	Boston	812	1st in Massachusetts
Harvard	Beth Israel Deaconess Medical Center	Boston	743	3rd in Massachusetts
Dartmouth	Dartmouth-Hitchcock Medical Center	Lebanon	507	1st in New Hampshire
Yale	Yale New Haven Hospital	New Haven	1,567	1st in Connecticut
Brown	Rhode Island Hospital	Providence	704	unranked
Cornell	NewYork-Presbyterian Hospital (Weill Cornell Medical Center)	New York City	2,696	1st in New York

== Rankings ==
Ivy League medical schools have some of the best reputations among medical schools in the United States. They are some of the oldest institutions of medical education. In 2023, many of the Ivy League schools (as part of a national trend) stopped sending information to the U.S. News medical school rankings; as of 2024 all but Yale and Dartmouth chose to withdraw and are currently unranked. Current rankings are listed below.

School name	U.S. News - research (2024)	U.S. News - primary care (2024)
Perelman School of Medicine at the University of Pennsylvania	Unranked	Unranked
Columbia University Vagelos College of Physicians and Surgeons	Unranked	Unranked
Harvard Medical School	Unranked	Unranked
Geisel School of Medicine at Dartmouth	Tier 2	Tier 2
Yale School of Medicine	Tier 1	Tier 3
Alpert Medical School (Brown University)	Unranked	Unranked
Weill Cornell Medicine	Unranked	Unranked
