= Little Ivies =

Unofficial group of American liberal arts colleges

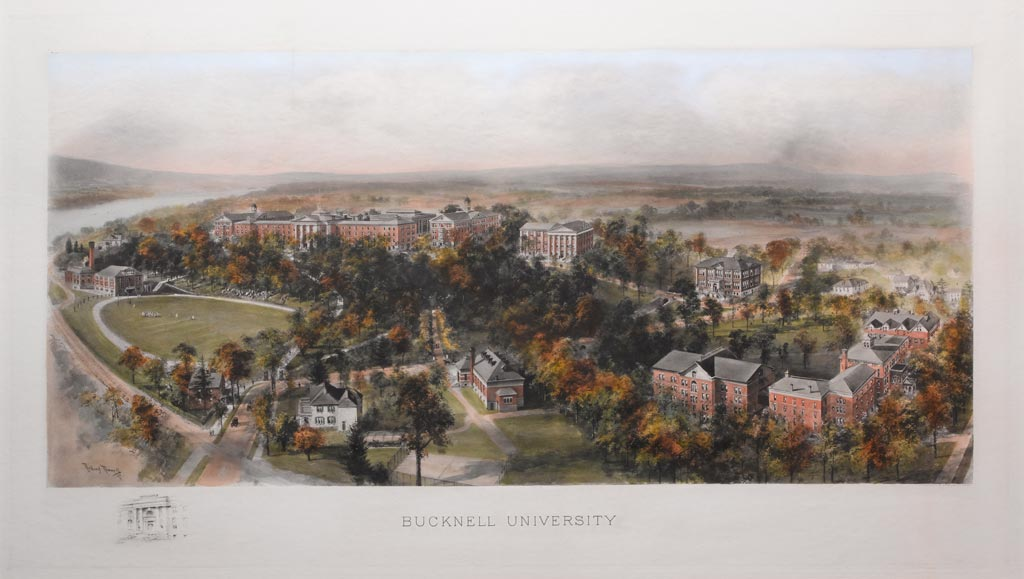
Painting of the campus of Bucknell University, a member of the Little Ivies, as it appeared in 1907

The Little Ivies are an unofficial group of small, academically competitive private liberal arts colleges in the Northeastern United States. The term Little Ivy derives from these schools' small student bodies, standards of academic excellence, associated historic social prestige, and highly selective admissions comparable to the Ivy League. According to Bloomberg, the Little Ivies are known for their large financial endowments, both in absolute terms and relative to their size.

The term is generally and most associated with the colleges of the New England Small College Athletic Conference (NESCAC), with select schools from the Liberty League, Patriot League and the Centennial Conference. The term was in active circulation to depict the original "Little Ivy" schools as schools and not merely athletic rivals at least as early as 1955. The New York Times quotes the president of Swarthmore College saying at the time, "We not only have the Ivy League, and the pretty clearly understood though seldom mentioned gradations within the Ivy League, but we have the Little Ivy League, and the jockeying for position within that."

== List of Little Ivies ==
A 2016 article by Bloomberg Businessweek lists the members of the Little Ivies as:

- Amherst College
- Bates College
- Bowdoin College
- Bucknell University
- Colby College
- Colgate University
- Connecticut College
- Hamilton College
- Haverford College
- Lafayette College
- Middlebury College
- Swarthmore College
- Trinity College
- Tufts University
- Union College
- Vassar College
- Wesleyan University
- Williams College

== See also ==
- Black Ivy League: Informal list of colleges known for their African American student body and alumni
- Maine Big Three: Three small liberal arts colleges that are part of a broader consortium
- The Hidden Ivies: 63 American colleges and universities that offer selective admissions
- Ivy League: Eight larger research universities similarly in the Northeastern United States
- Ivy Plus: Informal group of universities considered peers of the eight Ivy league institutions
- Little Three: Three small liberal arts colleges in Massachusetts and Connecticut
- Public Ivies: Group of public U.S. universities that "provide an Ivy League collegiate experience"
- Seven Sisters: Historically-women's colleges founded as an answer to the then-all male Ivy League
- Southern Ivies: Use of "Ivy" to characterize selective universities in the Southern United States
