= New England Small College Athletic Conference =

American collegiate athletic conference

- Association: NCAA
- Founded: 1971; 55 years ago
- Commissioner: Andrea Savage (since 1999)
- Sports fielded: 27; men's: 13; women's: 14
- Division: Division III
- No. of teams: 11
- Headquarters: Hadley, Massachusetts, U.S.
- Region: Northeastern; New England; Mid-Atlantic
- Website: nescac.com

Locations
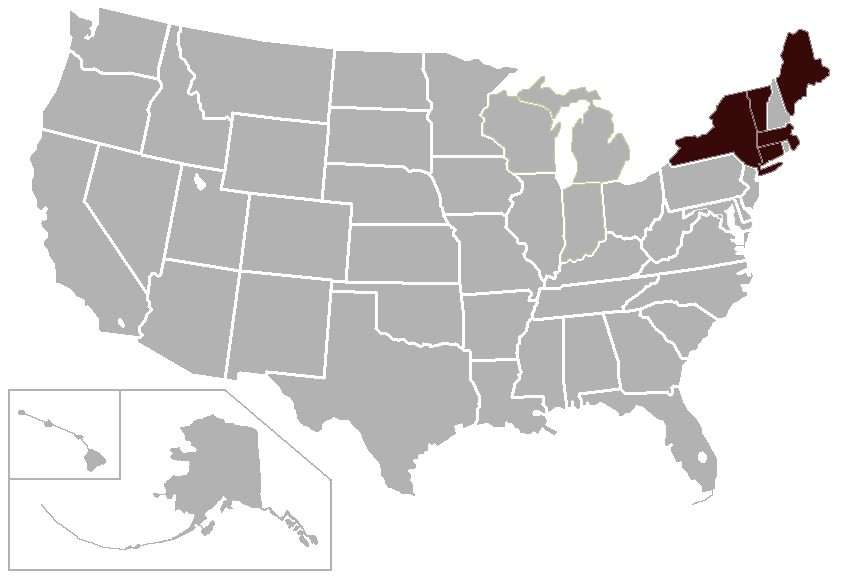

The New England Small College Athletic Conference (NESCAC) is an intercollegiate athletic conference that competes in the National Collegiate Athletic Association (NCAA) Division III comprising sports teams from eleven highly selective liberal arts institutions of higher education in the Northeastern United States. The eleven institutions are Amherst College, Bates College, Bowdoin College, Colby College, Connecticut College, Hamilton College, Middlebury College, Tufts University, Trinity College, Wesleyan University, and Williams College.

The conference originated with an agreement among Amherst, Bowdoin, Wesleyan and Williams in 1955. In 1971, Bates, Colby, Hamilton, Middlebury, Trinity, Tufts, and Union College joined and the NESCAC was officially formed. Union withdrew in 1977 and was replaced by Connecticut College in 1982. NESCAC members maintain some of the largest financial endowments among liberal arts colleges and some of the highest endowment per student among institutions of higher education in the world.

== History ==
Williams began its inaugural football season in 1881 and its rivalry with Amherst College is one of the longest at any level of college football. Bates and Bowdoin have competed against each other athletically since the 1870s and subsequently share one of the ten oldest NCAA Division III football rivalries; there is a long history of athletic competition between the two colleges and Colby. Colby began its a notable hockey rivalry with Bowdoin in 1922.

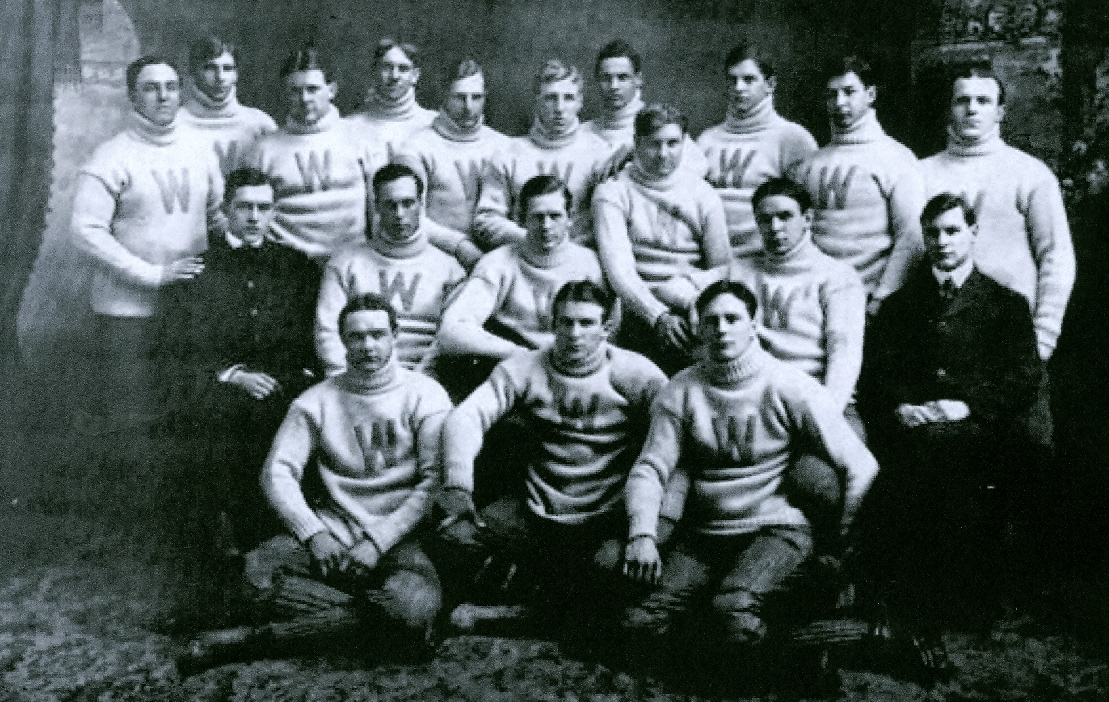
Williams College football team, 1901

In 1899, Amherst, Wesleyan and Williams schools first began to compete together as the "Triangular League". Since then they have continued to play each other in most sports on a regular basis. The conference originated with an agreement among Amherst, Bowdoin, Wesleyan and Williams in 1955. Later, Bates, Colby, Connecticut College, Hamilton, Middlebury, Trinity, Tufts joined and the NESCAC was officially formed. The Conference was created out of a concern for the direction of intercollegiate athletic programs and remains committed to keeping a proper perspective on the role of sport in higher education.

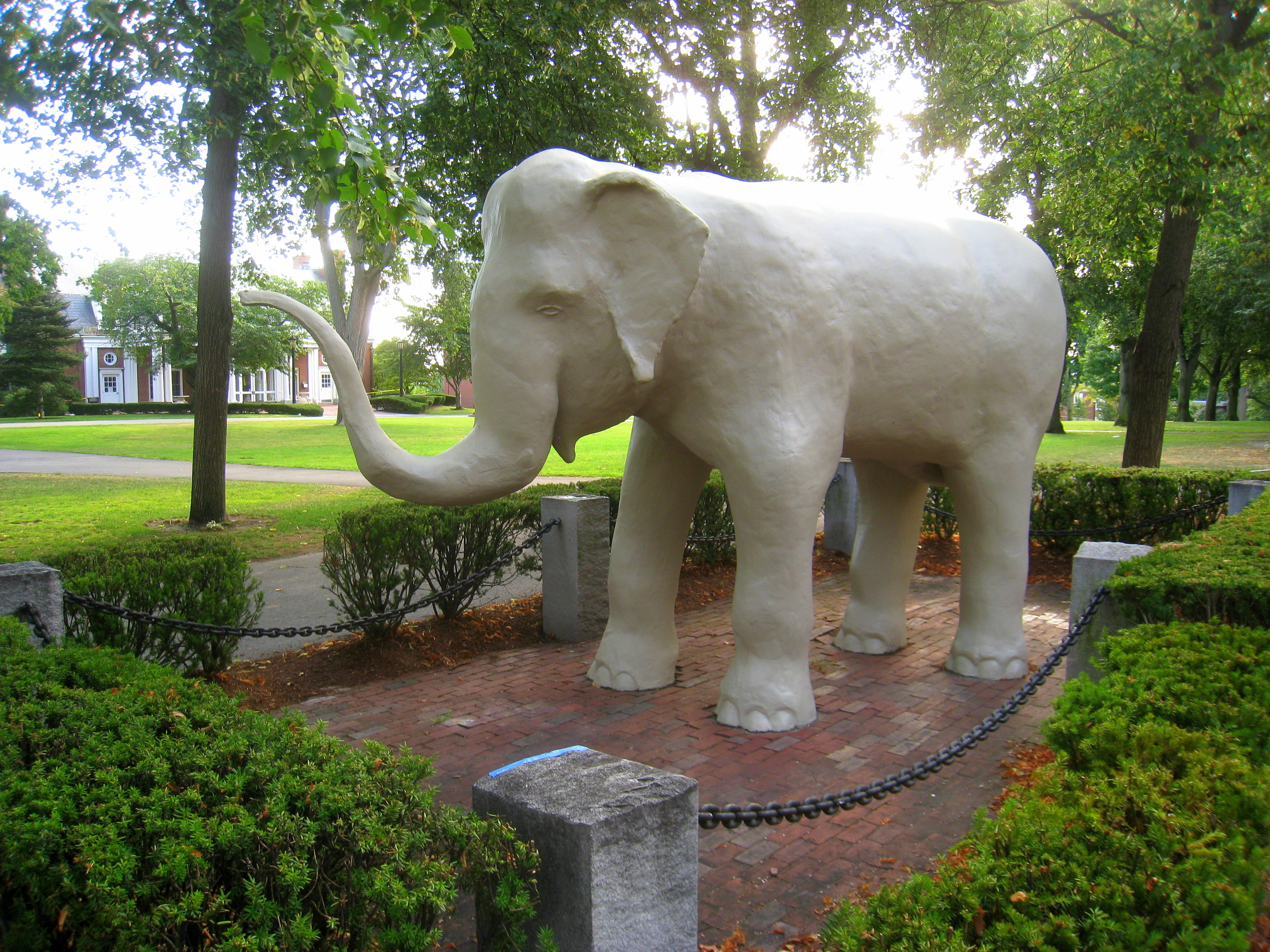
The mascot of Tufts University is Jumbo, the elephant, 2010

Member institutions believe athletic teams should be representative of school's entire student bodies and hew to NCAA Division III admissions and financial policies prohibiting athletic scholarships while awarding financial aid solely on the basis of need. Presidents of each NESCAC institution control intercollegiate athletic policy. Conference tenets are usually more restrictive than those of the NCAA Division III regarding season length, number of contests and post-season competition.

Four NESCAC institutions are among the 39 that founded the NCAA in 1905: Amherst, Tufts, Wesleyan, and Williams. Prior to 1993 NESCAC generally did not allow member schools to send teams to NCAA championships. Since then all sports except football have had this freedom, many excelling in the NCAA Division III championships. The NACDA Directors' Cup, awarded since 1996 to the college or university in each NCAA Division that wins the most college championships, has been claimed at the Division III level by a NESCAC institution every year except 1998. In the 2012–13 season, four of the top ten NACDA Director's Cup institutions were from NESCAC: Williams (1), Middlebury (3), Amherst (6), and Tufts (8).

=== Chronological timeline ===
- 1971 – The New England Small College Athletic Conference (NESCAC) was founded. Charter members included Amherst College, Bates College, Bowdoin College, Colby College, Hamilton College, Middlebury College, Trinity College, Tufts University, Union College, Wesleyan University and Williams College, beginning the 1971–72 academic year.
- 1977 – Union left the NESCAC after the 1976–77 academic year.
- 1982 – Connecticut College joined the NESCAC in the 1982–83 academic year.

== Member schools ==
Locations of NESCAC members geographically

=== Current members ===
The NESCAC currently has 11 full members, all of which are private institutions of higher education. Admission to NESCAC institutions is highly competitive, with admit rates consistently below 15% for the majority of the conference. Some member schools are among the oldest institutions of higher education in the U.S., with Williams, Bowdoin and Middlebury being among the 40 oldest institutions in the country.

NESCAC members maintain some of the largest financial endowments among liberal arts colleges in the world. The largest endowments within the NESCAC belong to the three based in Massachusetts: Amherst, Tufts, and Williams. All members of the NESCAC coordinate fundraising cycles, financing for athletic programs as well as share sporting facilities.

Institution	Location	Est.	Enr.	A.R.	Endowment (Note: US$ billions – Fiscal Year 2024. Endowment data provided by the National Association of College and University Business Officers (NACUBO) as self-reported by member schools.)	Nickname	Joined (Note: Represents the calendar year when fall sports competition begins.)	Colors
Amherst College	Amherst, MA	1821	1,907	7%	$3.549	Mammoths	1971	
Bates College	Lewiston, ME	1855	1,800	13%	$0.447	Bobcats	1971	
Bowdoin College	Brunswick, ME	1794	2,052	8.8%	$2.423	Polar Bears	1971	
Colby College	Waterville, ME	1813	2,300	7.5%	$1.160	Mules	1971	
Connecticut College	New London, CT	1911	1,990	36%	$0.482	Camels	1982	
Hamilton College (Note: Hamilton also competed in the Liberty League from 1995–96 to 2010–11 before leaving the Liberty in order to fully align with the NESCAC. The school previously held dual membership with both the Liberty and NESCAC conferences.)	Clinton, NY	1793	2,053	12%	$1.361	Continentals	1971	
Middlebury College	Middlebury, VT	1800	2,600	10.4%	$2.370	Panthers	1971	
Trinity College	Hartford, CT	1823	2,159	36%	$0.834	Bantams	1971	
Tufts University	Medford, MA	1852	6,635	9%	$2.533	Jumbos	1971	
Wesleyan University	Middletown, CT	1831	3,064	13.9%	$1.583	Cardinals	1971	
Williams College	Williamstown, MA	1793	2,250	8%	$3.655	Ephs	1971	

=== Former member ===
The NESCAC had one former full member, which was a private institution.

Institution	Location	Founded	Affiliation	Enrollment	Nickname	Joined (Note: Represents the calendar year when fall sports competition begins.)	Left (Note: Represents the calendar year when spring sports competition ends.)	Colors	Current conference
Union College	Schenectady, NY	1795	Nonsectarian	2,197	Dutchmen & Dutchwomen (Note: Current nickname is the Garnet Chargers since the 2023–24 school year.)	1971	1977		Liberty (LL)

=== Membership timeline ===
Full member (all sports) Full member (non-football) Associate member (football) Associate member (sport)

== Academics ==
Reaching the ivory tower: systemic grade deflation (2005)
School	Grade deflation score	Source
Amherst	84.5/100	
Bates	85.5/100	
Bowdoin	83.5/100	
Colby	81.5/100	
Connecticut	N/A	
Hamilton	83.0/100	
Middlebury	86.0/100	
Trinity	77.5/100	
Tufts	N/A	
Wesleyan	87.0/100	
Williams	89.0/100	

The NESCAC is known for low grade inflation, grade deflation, and rigorous academic standards. The conference's schools have received media attention over both perceived grade inflation and deflation.

The colleges are also known for a range of high and relatively low tuition rates and comprehensive fees. Some of the colleges have been named the most expensive in the United States.

=== Association of American Universities ===
Tufts University is a member of the Association of American Universities.

=== Geographic distribution ===
Most applicants to schools in the NESCAC come from the Northeast, largely from the New York City, Boston, and Philadelphia areas. As all NESCAC schools are located on the East Coast, and all but one are in New England, most graduates end up working and residing in the Northeast after graduation.

== Revenue ==
Total revenue includes ticket sales, contributions and donations, rights/licensing, student fees, school funds, and all other sources including TV income, camp income, food, and novelties. Total expenses includes coaching/staff, buildings/grounds, maintenance, utilities and rental fees, and all other costs including recruiting, team travel, equipment and uniforms, conference dues, and insurance costs.

Conference rank (2020)	Institution	2020 total revenue from athletics	2020 total expenses on athletics
1	Bowdoin College	$14,192,310	$14,192,310
3	Trinity College	$9,361,541	$7,767,209
2	Wesleyan University	$9,463,205	$7,475,961
5	Colby College	$8,768,711	$8,768,711
6	Williams College	$8,272,501	$8,272,501
4	Tufts University	$9,206,611	$7,635,731
7	Amherst College	$7,990,643	$7,505,943
8	Bates College	$6,524,589	$6,302,982
9	Middlebury College	$5,924,584	$5,924,584
10	Hamilton College	$5,848,366	$5,848,366
11	Connecticut College	$4,619,333	$4,619,333

== Facilities ==
School	Football		Soccer		Basketball		Ice hockey	
School	Stadium	Capacity	Stadium	Capacity	Arena	Capacity	Arena	Capacity
Amherst	Pratt Field	2,500	Hitchcock Field	6,000	LeFrak Gymnasium	2,450	Orr Rink	N/A
Bates	Garcelon Field	3,000	Russel Street Field	4,000	Alumni Gymnasium	750	Underhill Arena	1,000
Bowdoin	Whittier Field	9,000	Pickard Field	4,500	Morrell Gymnasium	2,000	Sidney J. Watson Arena	1,900
Colby	Harold Alfond Stadium	5,000	Colby Soccer Field	3,700	Wadsworth Gymnasium	2,500	Jack Kelley Rink	1,800
Connecticut	Non-football school	N/A	Freeman Field	1,000	Luce Fieldhouse	800	Dayton Arena	N/A
Hamilton	Steuben Field	2,500	Love Field	2,500	Margaret Bundy Scott Field House	2,500	Russell Sage Rink	600
Middlebury	Youngman Field at Alumni Stadium	3,500	Middlebury Soccer Field	1,200	Pepin Gymnasium	1,200	Chip Kenyon Arena	2,300
Trinity	Jessee/Miller Field	5,500	Jessee/Miller Field	6,500	Oosting Gym	2,000	Koeppel Community Sports Center	3,400
Tufts	Ellis Oval	4,000	Ellis Oval	4,000	Cousens Gym	1,000	Malden Valley Forum	500
Wesleyan	Andrus Field	3,000	Jackson Field	1,200	Silloway Gymnasium	1,200	Spurrier-Snyder Rink	1,500
Williams	Weston Field	6,000	Weston Field	6,000	Chandler Gymnasium	2,900	Lansing Chapman Rink	2,500

== Sports ==
The NESCAC sponsors championship competition in 13 men's and 14 women's NCAA sanctioned sports.

Conference Sports
Sport	Men's	Women's
Baseball	✓	
Basketball	✓	✓
Cross Country	✓	✓
Field Hockey		✓
Football	✓	
Golf	✓	✓
Ice Hockey	✓	✓
Lacrosse	✓	✓
Rowing	✓	✓
Soccer	✓	✓
Softball		✓
Squash	✓	✓
Swimming & Diving	✓	✓
Tennis	✓	✓
Track & Field (Outdoor)	✓	✓
Volleyball		✓

=== Men's Sports ===
✓ Yes | ✗ No | * Funded as club team but competes with NESCAC

School	Baseball	Basketball	Cross Country	Football	Golf	Ice Hockey	Lacrosse	Rowing	Soccer	Squash (Note: Non NCAA sport)	Swimming & Diving	Tennis	Track & Field (Outdoor)	Total NESCAC Sports
Amherst	✓	✓	✓	✓	✓	✓	✓	Orange tick	✓	✓	✓	✓	✓	13*
Bates	✓	✓	✓	✓	✓	✗	✓	✓	✓	✓	✓	✓	✓	12
Bowdoin	✓	✓	✓	✓	✓	✓	✓	Orange tick	✓	✓	✓	✓	✓	13*
Colby	✓	✓	✓	✓	✓	✓	✓	✓	✓	✓	✓	✓	✓	13
Connecticut College	✗	✓	✓	✗	✗	✓	✓	✓	✓	✓	✓	✓	✓	10
Hamilton	✓	✓	✓	✓	✓	✓	✓	✓	✓	✓	✓	✓	✓	13
Middlebury	✓	✓	✓	✓	✓	✓	✓	Orange tick	✓	✓	✓	✓	✓	13*
Trinity	✓	✓	✓	✓	✓	✓	✓	✓	✓	✓	✓	✓	✓	13
Tufts	✓	✓	✓	✓	✓	✓	✓	✓	✓	✓	✓	✓	✓	13
Wesleyan	✓	✓	✓	✓	✓	✓	✓	✓	✓	✓	✓	✓	✓	13
Williams	✓	✓	✓	✓	✓	✓	✓	✓	✓	✓	✓	✓	✓	13
Totals	10	11	11	10	10	10	11	11*	11	11	11	11	11	139

Men's varsity sports not sponsored by the NESCAC that are played by NESCAC schools

School	Alpine Skiing	Fencing	Nordic Skiing	Rowing*	Sailing	Track & Field (Indoor)	Water Polo	Wrestling
Amherst				ACRA		IND		
Bates	EISA		EISA			IND		
Bowdoin			EISA	ACRA	NEISA	IND		
Colby	EISA		EISA			IND		
Connecticut College					NEISA	IND	MPSF	
Hamilton						IND		
Middlebury	EISA		EISA	ACRA		IND		
Trinity		2028-29				IND		NEWA
Tufts					NEISA	IND		
Wesleyan						IND		NEWA
Williams	EISA		EISA			IND		NEWA

Notes

*Rowing at Amherst, Bowdoin, and Middlebury is funded as club sport (versus varsity), so is sponsored by ACRA rather than NESCAC. However, all three teams compete against NESCAC schools and in NESCAC regattas.

=== Women's Sports ===
✓ Yes | ✗ No | * Funded as club team but competes with NESCAC

School	Basketball	Cross Country	Field Hockey	Golf	Ice Hockey	Lacrosse	Rowing	Soccer	Softball	Squash (Note: Non NCAA sport)	Swimming & Diving	Tennis	Track & Field (Outdoor)	Volleyball	Total NESCAC Sports
Amherst	✓	✓	✓	✓	✓	✓	Orange tick	✓	✓	✓	✓	✓	✓	✓	14*
Bates	✓	✓	✓	✓	✗	✓	✓	✓	✓	✓	✓	✓	✓	✓	13
Bowdoin	✓	✓	✓	✓	✓	✓	Orange tick	✓	✓	✓	✓	✓	✓	✓	14*
Colby	✓	✓	✓	✗	✓	✓	✓	✓	✓	✓	✓	✓	✓	✓	13
Connecticut College	✓	✓	✓	✗	✓	✓	✓	✓	✗	✓	✓	✓	✓	✓	12
Hamilton	✓	✓	✓	✓	✓	✓	✓	✓	✓	✓	✓	✓	✓	✓	14
Middlebury	✓	✓	✓	✓	✓	✓	Orange tick	✓	✓	✓	✓	✓	✓	✓	14*
Trinity	✓	✓	✓	✓	✓	✓	✓	✓	✓	✓	✓	✓	✓	✓	14
Tufts	✓	✓	✓	✗	✗	✓	✓	✓	✓	✓	✓	✓	✓	✓	12
Wesleyan	✓	✓	✓	✓	✓	✓	✓	✓	✓	✓	✓	✓	✓	✓	14
Williams	✓	✓	✓	✓	✓	✓	✓	✓	✓	✓	✓	✓	✓	✓	14
Totals	11	11	11	8	9	11	11*	11	10	11	11	11	11	11	148

Women's varsity sports not sponsored by the NESCAC that are played by NESCAC schools

School	Alpine Skiing	Fencing	Nordic Skiing	Rowing*	Rugby	Sailing	Track & Field (Indoor)	Water Polo
Amherst				ACRA			IND	
Bates	EISA		EISA				IND	
Bowdoin			EISA	ACRA	NIRA	NEISA	IND	
Colby	EISA		EISA				IND	
Connecticut College						NEISA	IND	CWPA
Hamilton							IND	
Middlebury	EISA		EISA	ACRA			IND	
Trinity		2027-28					IND	
Tufts		NFC				NEISA	IND	
Wesleyan							IND	
Williams	EISA		EISA				IND	

Notes
*Rowing at Amherst, Bowdoin, and Middlebury is funded as club sport (versus varsity), so is sponsored by ACRA rather than NESCAC. However, all three teams compete against NESCAC schools and in NESCAC regattas.

== Football ==
Until the 2017 season, the 10 football-playing NESCAC schools only played 8 regular season games. On April 27, 2017, the NESCAC announced that it would adopt a full 9-game round robin schedule. The NESCAC football league is notable for member teams playing conference games only, and until the 2026 season the conference had a ban on post-season play. While some Division II and Division III teams play only conference schedules, NESCAC is unique in all of its members playing only within conference games. Every institution fields a football team except for Connecticut College.

== Baseball ==
NESCAC Baseball is the only men's sport to utilize divisions. Bates, Bowdoin, Colby, Tufts, and Trinity compete in the East Division, while Amherst, Hamilton, Middlebury, Wesleyan, and Williams compete in the West Division. Connecticut College does not sponsor baseball. The NESCAC has won the College World Series once: by the Trinity Bantams in 2008. Current member schools have appeared in the College World Series a combined total of 5 times.

College World Series / NCAA Tournament History
School	College World Series Championships	College World Series Appearances	Last CWS Appearance	NCAA Tournament Appearances	Last NCAA Appearance
Trinity	2008	4	2009	10	2019
Wesleyan		1	1994	3	2015
Tufts		0 (Note: Tufts made the 1950 College World Series; however, for the purpose of this list only NCAA Division III statistics are included.)	n/a	10	2023
Amherst		0	n/a	7	2018
Williams		0	n/a	3	2007
Bowdoin		0	n/a	2	2012
Middlebury		0	n/a	4	2024
Bates		0	n/a	0	n/a
Colby		0	n/a	1	2024
Hamilton		0	n/a	0	n/a

== NCAA championships ==
The Middlebury Panthers lead the NESCAC in NCAA men's titles with 15 and in overall NCAA titles with 45, while the Williams Ephs and Middlebury Panthers are tied for the lead in women's titles with 30. Excluded from this list are all national championships earned outside the scope of NCAA competition, including women's AIAW championships.

School	Total	Men	Women	Co-ed	Nickname	Most successful sport (titles)
Middlebury	45	15	30	0	Panthers	Women's lacrosse (12)
Williams	38	8	30	0	Ephs	Women's tennis (10)
Tufts	19	11	8	0	Jumbos	Men's lacrosse (6)
Amherst	14	6	8	0	Mammoths	Women's basketball (3)
Bates	5	0	5	0	Bobcats	Women's rowing (5)
Bowdoin	5	1	4	0	Polar Bears	Field hockey (4)
Trinity	5	3	2	0	Bantams	Baseball (1), Men's Basketball (1), Women's lacrosse (1), Women's rowing (1), Men's ice hockey (1)
Wesleyan	3	1	2	0	Cardinals	Women's tennis (2)
Hamilton	2	1	1	0	Continentals	Women's lacrosse (1), Men's ice hockey (1)
Colby	1	0	1	0	Mules	Women's rowing (1)
Connecticut College	1	1	0	0	Camels	Men's soccer (1)
Total	137	46	91	0		

The following is a list of NCAA-recognized national team championships by NESCAC schools.

Baseball (1):

- 2008 – Trinity

Men's basketball (4):

- 2003 – Williams
- 2007 – Amherst
- 2013 – Amherst
- 2025 – Trinity

Women's basketball (3):

- 2011 – Amherst
- 2017 – Amherst
- 2018 – Amherst

Men's cross country (2):

- 1994 – Williams
- 1995 – Williams

Women's cross country (10):

- 2000 – Middlebury
- 2001 – Middlebury
- 2002 – Williams
- 2003 – Middlebury
- 2004 – Williams
- 2006 – Middlebury
- 2007 – Amherst
- 2008 – Middlebury
- 2010 – Middlebury
- 2015 – Williams

Field hockey (15):

- 1998 – Middlebury
- 2007 – Bowdoin
- 2008 – Bowdoin
- 2010 – Bowdoin
- 2012 – Tufts
- 2013 – Bowdoin
- 2015 – Middlebury
- 2017 – Middlebury
- 2018 – Middlebury
- 2019 – Middlebury
- 2021 – Middlebury
- 2022 – Middlebury
- 2023 – Middlebury
- 2024 – Middlebury
- 2025 – Tufts

Women's golf (1):

- 2015 – Williams

Men's ice hockey (10):

- 1995 – Middlebury
- 1996 – Middlebury
- 1997 – Middlebury
- 1998 – Middlebury
- 1999 – Middlebury
- 2004 – Middlebury
- 2005 – Middlebury
- 2006 – Middlebury
- 2015 – Trinity
- 2026 – Hamilton

Women's ice hockey (5):

- 2004 – Middlebury
- 2005 – Middlebury
- 2006 – Middlebury
- 2009 – Amherst
- 2010 – Amherst
- 2022 - Middlebury

Men's lacrosse (10):

- 2000 – Middlebury
- 2001 – Middlebury
- 2002 – Middlebury
- 2010 – Tufts
- 2014 – Tufts
- 2015 – Tufts
- 2018 – Wesleyan
- 2024 – Tufts
- 2025 – Tufts
- 2026 – Tufts

Women's lacrosse (15):

- 1997 – Middlebury
- 1999 – Middlebury
- 2001 – Middlebury
- 2002 – Middlebury
- 2003 – Amherst
- 2004 – Middlebury
- 2008 – Hamilton
- 2012 – Trinity
- 2016 – Middlebury
- 2019 – Middlebury
- 2022 – Middlebury
- 2023 – Middlebury
- 2024 – Middlebury
- 2025 – Middlebury
- 2026 – Middlebury

Women's rowing (19)

- 2002 – Williams
- 2003 – Colby
- 2006 – Williams
- 2007 – Williams
- 2008 – Williams
- 2009 – Williams
- 2010 – Williams
- 2011 – Williams
- 2012 – Williams
- 2013 – Williams
- 2014 - Trinity
- 2015 – Bates
- 2017 – Bates
- 2018 – Bates
- 2019 – Bates
- 2021 – Bates
- 2024 – Tufts
- 2025 – Tufts
- 2026 – Tufts

Men's soccer (10):

- 1995 – Williams
- 2007 – Middlebury
- 2014 – Tufts
- 2015 – Amherst
- 2016 – Tufts
- 2018 – Tufts
- 2019 – Tufts
- 2021 – Connecticut College
- 2024 – Amherst
- 2025 – Tufts

Women's soccer (3):

- 2015 – Williams
- 2017 – Williams
- 2018 – Williams

Softball (3):

- 2013 – Tufts
- 2014 – Tufts
- 2015 – Tufts

Women's swimming & diving (2):

- 1982 – Williams
- 1983 – Williams

Men's tennis (10):

- 1999 – Williams
- 2001 – Williams
- 2002 – Williams
- 2004 – Middlebury
- 2010 – Middlebury
- 2011 – Amherst
- 2013 – Williams
- 2014 – Amherst
- 2016 – Bowdoin
- 2018 – Middlebury

Women's tennis (13):

- 1999 – Amherst
- 2001 – Williams
- 2002 – Williams
- 2008 – Williams
- 2009 – Williams
- 2010 – Williams
- 2011 – Williams
- 2012 – Williams
- 2013 – Williams
- 2015 – Williams
- 2017 – Williams
- 2019 – Wesleyan
- 2026 – Wesleyan

Women's indoor track (2):

- 2007 – Williams
- 2019 – Williams

== See also ==
- The Little Ivies: small liberal arts colleges, in the Northeastern United States, comparable to Ivy League
- The Little Three: three small liberal arts colleges in Massachusetts and Connecticut
- The Colby-Bates-Bowdoin Consortium: three small liberal arts colleges known as the "Maine Big Three"
- The Ivy League: eight larger research universities similarly in the Northeastern United States
