= The Hidden Ivies =

Book by Howard Greene and Matthew Green

- First edition (2000)
- Author: Howard Greene; Matthew Greene
- Language: English
- Subject: Education
- Publisher: Cliff Street Books
- Publication date: 2000 (first); 2009 (second); 2016 (third)
- Publication place: United States
- Media type: Print (paperback)
- Pages: 317
- ISBN: 978-0-06-095362-1
- Dewey Decimal: 378.1/61 21
- LC Class: LB2350.5 G74 2000

Hidden Ivies is a college educational guide with the most recent edition, The Hidden Ivies, 3rd Edition: 63 of America's Top Liberal Arts Colleges and Universities, published in 2016, by educational consultants Howard and Matthew Greene.

== Overview ==
Howard and Matthew Greene's Hidden Ivies focuses on college admissions in the United States. According to Union College, "the authors contend that students who attend one of the 'Hidden Ivies' are likely to acquire critical skills or instincts, including cooperation, leadership, collaboration, mentoring, appreciating personal, religious and cultural differences, and 'learning the truth that intelligence without character, personal integrity and a working set of values can be a dangerous thing.'"

The authors define both the title of this book as well as their goals in writing it as: "to create greater awareness of the small, distinctive cluster of colleges and universities of excellence that are available to gifted college-bound students." In the introduction, the authors further explain their aim by referring specifically to "the group historically known as the 'Little Ivies' (including Amherst, Bowdoin, Middlebury, Swarthmore, Wesleyan, and Williams)" which the authors say have "scaled the heights of prestige and selectivity and also turn away thousands of our best and brightest young men and women."

== Inclusions ==
=== Northeast ===
- Amherst College
- Barnard College
- Bates College
- Boston College
- Bowdoin College
- Brandeis University
- Bryn Mawr College
- Bucknell University
- Colby College
- Colgate University
- College of the Holy Cross
- Connecticut College
- Dickinson College
- Fordham University
- Franklin & Marshall College
- Hamilton College
- Haverford College
- Johns Hopkins University
- Lafayette College
- Lehigh University
- Middlebury College
- Mount Holyoke College
- Skidmore College
- Smith College
- Swarthmore College
- Trinity College
- Tufts University
- Union College
- University of Rochester
- Vassar College
- Villanova University
- Wellesley College
- Wesleyan University
- Williams College

=== South ===
- Davidson College
- Duke University
- Emory University
- Georgetown University
- Rice University
- Sewanee: The University of the South
- Southern Methodist University
- Tulane University
- University of Richmond
- Vanderbilt University
- Wake Forest University
- Washington and Lee University

=== Midwest ===
- Carleton College
- Case Western Reserve University
- Denison University
- Grinnell College
- Kenyon College
- Macalester College
- Northwestern University
- Oberlin College
- University of Chicago
- University of Notre Dame
- Washington University in St. Louis

=== West ===
- Claremont McKenna College
- Colorado College
- Pomona College
- Reed College
- Stanford University
- University of Southern California

== See also ==
- Black Ivy League—A list of historically black colleges or universities that provide Ivy quality education in a predominantly black environment
- Public Ivies—Group of public US universities thought to "provide an Ivy League collegiate experience at a public school price"
- Southern Ivies—Complimentary use of "Ivy" to characterize excellent universities in the US South
- Little Ivies—An unofficial group of small, academically competitive private liberal arts colleges in the Northeastern United States.
- Jesuit Ivy—Use of "Ivy" to characterize Boston College and other prominent American Jesuit colleges
- Seven Sisters—Seven highly selective liberal arts colleges in the Northeastern United States that are historically women's colleges, intended as the educational equivalent to the (traditionally male) Ivy League colleges
