= Colby Mules =

Intercollegiate sports teams of Colby College

- University: Colby College
- Conference: NESCAC (primary); EISA (skiing)
- NCAA: Division III
- Athletic director: Amanda V. DeMartino
- Location: Waterville, Maine
- Varsity teams: 32 varsity
- Mascot: Morty the Mule
- Nickname: Mules
- Colors: Colby blue and Priscilla gray
- Website: colbyathletics.com
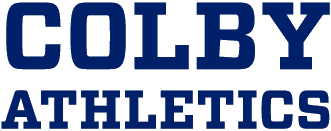

The Colby Mules (formerly known as the White Mules prior to 2002) are the varsity and club athletic teams of Colby College, a liberal arts college located in Waterville, Maine. Colby's varsity teams compete in the New England Small College Athletic Conference of the National Collegiate Athletic Association (NCAA) Division III. The college offers 32 varsity teams, plus club sports, intramural sports called I-play.

== Varsity sports ==
Men's sports	Women's sports
Alpine skiing	Alpine skiing
Baseball	Basketball
Basketball	Cross country
Cross country	Field hockey
Football	Ice hockey
Golf	Lacrosse
Ice hockey	Nordic skiing
Lacrosse	Rowing
Nordic skiing	Soccer
Rowing	Softball
Soccer	Squash
Squash	Swimming
Swimming	Tennis
Tennis	Track and field
Track and field	Volleyball

=== Alpine skiing ===
The Colby alpine ski team received varsity status in 1986 and won five Eastern Intercollegiate Ski Association (EISA) Division II titles between 1987 and 1992. That success prompted the college to upgrade the program to Division I status in 1993. Abbi Lapthrop '06 captured the NCAA giant slalom title at the NCAA Skiing Championships at Steamboat Springs, Colorado, in 2006. Lathrop is the first Colby athlete to compete against Division I schools and win a national title.

=== Basketball ===
The men's basketball team were the 1990, 1991, 1993, and 1998 Eastern College Athletic Conference men's basketball tournament champions. The Mules were featured by the Bleacher Report in 2014 for their bench celebrations. The 2019–20 team finished the season ranked 21st nationally.

=== Football ===
The Colby-Bates-Bowdoin rivalry in gridiron football dates back to the 1870s.

In 2000, the Mules won the first ever NESCAC Championship-the only time in school history this has happened.

On November 28, 2017, 6 year coach Jonathan Michaeles resigned after leading the Mules through a tough 1–8 season. Colby recently announced UMaine Veteran Jack Cosgrove as the new head coach.

On November, 10th, 2018, during the Colby vs Bowdoin game, there was a reunion of the 2000 NESCAC Champion Mules, the only team in school history to have claimed the title. At half-time of the game, there was a ring ceremony celebrating the 18-year anniversary of the all-time greatest team.

The team plays at the Harold Alfond Stadium in Waterville.

=== Ice Hockey ===
The ice hockey teams formerly competed in the ECAC Hockey conference (men from 1961 to 1964 and women from 1993 to 1999); now both teams compete in the New England Small College Athletic Conference.

=== Nordic skiing ===
The cross country ski teams compete in the Eastern Intercollegiate Ski Association.

=== Rowing ===
The women's rowing team was the 2003 winner of the NCAA Division III Rowing Championship. Men and women compete in the New England Rowing Championship.

== Club teams ==
Separate from the Colby Mules, club sports are recognized but not directly supported by the college.

- Cycling team rides in the Eastern Collegiate Cycling Conference.
- Equestrian competes in the Intercollegiate Horse Show Association.
- Fencing competes in the United States Fencing Association.
- Men's water polo competes in the North Atlantic Division of the Collegiate Water Polo Association.
- Rugby team competes in the New England Rugby Football Union.
- Sailing team participates in the New England Intercollegiate Sailing Association,
- Ultimate Frisbee
- Woodsmen's Team competes against other schools in the Northeast and Canada

== Nickname, symbol, and mascot ==
The White Mule was adopted as Colby's mascot in 1923 when Colby Echo editor Joseph Coburn Smith '24 suggested in an editorial that the success of the football team had made its customary "dark horse" label obsolete. In 2002, the name was shortened to Mules. As for a mascot, currently there's a costume with a giant mule's head, known to students as "Morty".

== Facilities ==
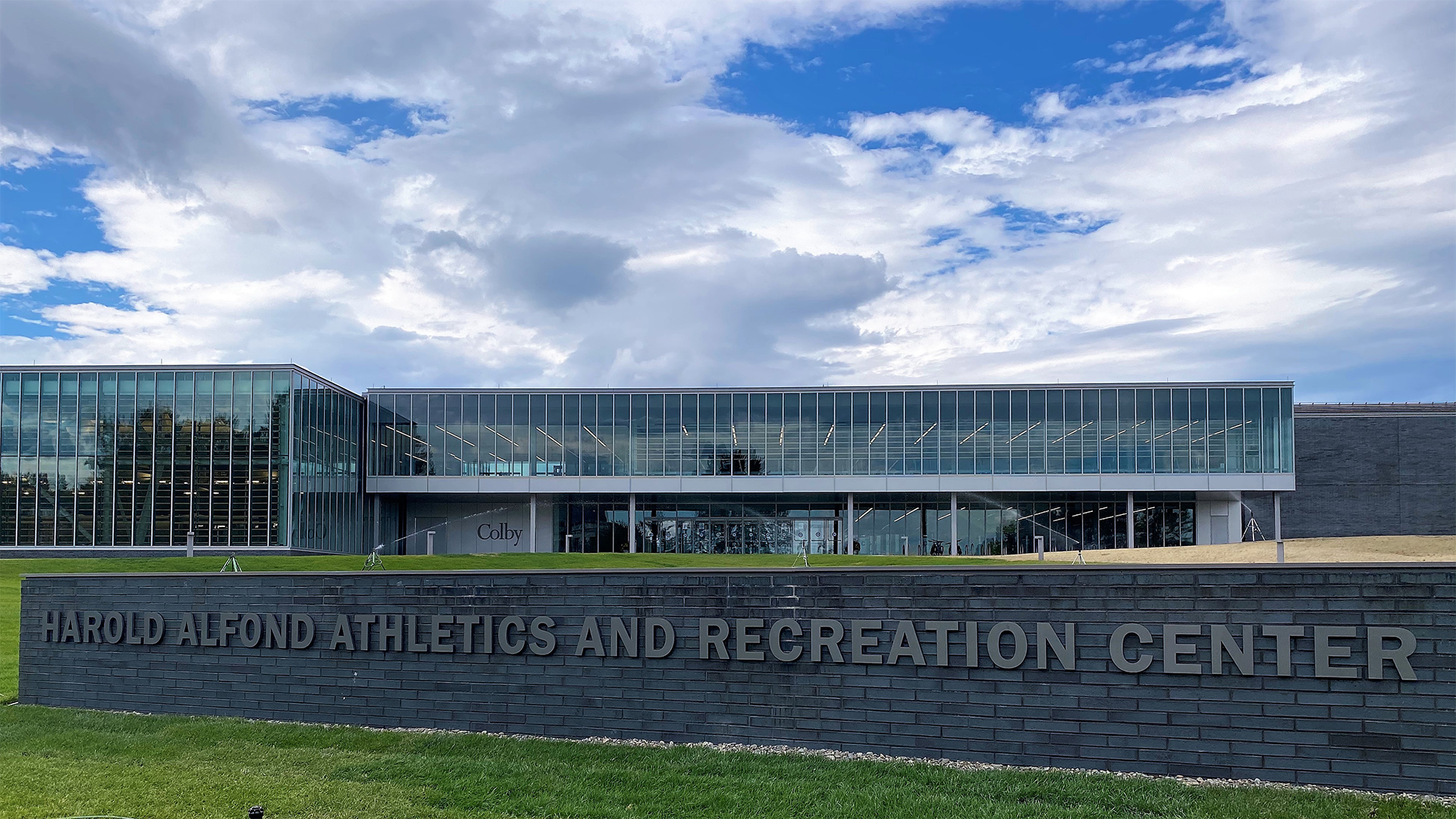
Harold Alfond Athletics and Recreation Center, opened in 2020

The Harold Alfond Athletics and Recreation Center is the center of athletic life at Colby, and home to the Colby Mules. In addition to athletic offices, it contains:

- The Margaret M. Crook Center (Men's and Women's Basketball, Volleyball)
- The Jack Kelley Rink at the O'Neil|O'Donnell Forum (Men's and Women's Ice Hockey)
- The Boulos Family Fitness Center
- Aquatics Center
- Squash Center
- Indoor Competition Center
- Aidan's Climbing and Bouldering Wall

Colby Outdoor Venues:

- Harold Alfond Stadium new in 2008, contains an illuminated 400-meter, 8-lane track, with area for the long and triple jump, new discus and hammer cage and separate areas for shot put and javelin competition.
- Seaverns Field, inside the stadium, is an illuminated synthetic turf field used by the football, soccer, and lacrosse teams.
- Bill Alfond Field is an illuminated synthetic turf field for field hockey and men's and women's lacrosse.
- The Alfond-Wales Tennis Courts – 10 hard-surface courts, including the Klein Tennis Pavilion
- The Colby soccer field and Loebs Field, two full-size playing fields west of the soccer field for soccer practice as well as intramural sports and summer sports camps.
- Crafts Field (Softball) and Coombs Field (Baseball) make up the Baseball and Softball Complex.
- The Campbell Cross Country Trails are used for cross-country running and skiing.

In addition to the on-campus facilities, the Mules also utilize:

- The Colby-Hume Center, located on Messalonskee Lake for Colby's crew and sailing teams. It is also open to the Colby community.
- The Sugarloaf Ski Resort is home to the Alpine Ski Team, and is used extensively by recreational skiers from Colby because of its proximity to campus, about 50 miles away.
- Quarry Road Trails for Nordic Skiing, Cross Country.
- The Waterville Country Club for golf.
