= Bates Bobcats =

Athletic teams of Bates College

- College: Bates College
- NCAA: Division III
- Conference: New England Small College Athletic Conference (NESCAC)
- Athletic director: Stacey Bunting
- Location: Lewiston, Maine, U.S.
- Varsity teams: 16 men's; 16 women's
- Football stadium: Garcelon Field
- Basketball arena: Alumni Gymnasium
- Baseball stadium: Leahey Baseball Field
- Softball stadium: Lafayette Street Pitch
- Soccer stadium: Russell Street Field
- Lacrosse stadium: Campus Avenue Field
- Colors: Garnet and gray
- Mascot: Bobcat
- Website: gobatesbobcats.com
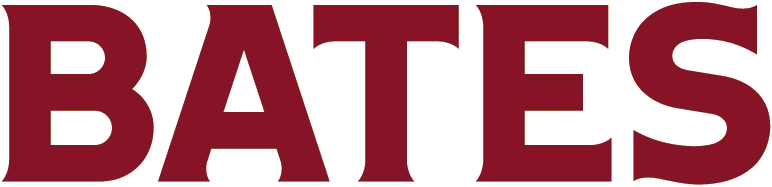

The Bates Bobcats are the athletic teams of Bates College largely based in Lewiston, Maine and the surrounding areas. The college's official mascot has been the bobcat since 1924, and maintains garnet as its official color. The school sponsors 32 varsity sports (16 men's, 16 women's), most of which compete in the Division III as a member of the New England Small College Athletic Conference (NESCAC). Bates has rivalries with Princeton in Squash and Dartmouth in Skiing and selected hockey bouts. The college competes with its Maine rivals Bowdoin and Colby in the Colby-Bates-Bowdoin Consortium (CBB). This is one of the oldest football rivalries in the United States. The three colleges contest the Chase Regatta with the CBB. The college is the all-time leader of the Chase Regatta with a total of 14 wins.

Bates maintains 31 varsity teams, and 9 club teams, including sailing, cycling, ice hockey, rugby, and water polo. According to U.S. Rowing, the Women's rowing team was ranked first in the NESCAC, and first overall in NCAA Division III rowing in 2016. In April 2005, the college's athletic program was ranked in the top 5% of national athletics programs. As of 2026, the college has graduated a total of 12 Olympians, one of whom won the Olympic gold medal rowing for Canada. The Bobcats have broken records on the state, regional and national level. In the 2015 season, the women's rowing team was the most decorated rowing team in collegiate racing. Bates has the 5th highest NESCAC title hold, and holds the top titles in women's and men's rowing. Bates follows Bowdoin's 30 NESCAC titles with its 16, and its followed by Colby's 9 titles.

== Men's sports ==
=== Men's football ===
The men's football team competes in NCAA Division III as a member of the New England Small College Athletic Conference (NESCAC). The football team is led by head coach Matt Coyne.

Year	Competition	Record	Result	Cite
2016	CBB Championship	Bates won with a 24–7 win over Bowdoin, after their 29–19 victory over Colby.	Won	
2015	CBB Championship	Bates won with a 31–0 win over Bowdoin, after their 10–9 overtime home victory over Colby.	Won	
2014	CBB Championship	Bates won with a 10–7 win over Bowdoin, after their 34–28 win over Colby.	Won	
2012	CBB Championship	Bates won with a 14–6 win over Bowdoin, after their 31–6 win over Colby.	Won	
2002	CBB Championship	Bates won with a 48–28 win over Bowdoin after their 19–14 win over Colby.	Won	
1999	CBB Championship	Bates won with a 38–7 win over Bowdoin after an overtime victory of 20–17 with Colby.	Won	
1986	CBB Championship	Bates won with 36–0 shutout over Bowdoin, after a 21–6 win over Colby.	Won	
1981	CBB Championship	Bates won with a 23–1 win over Bowdoin after their 10–6 win over Colby.	Won	
1978	CBB Championship	Bates won with a 24–14 win over Bowdoin after their 27–20 win over Colby.	Won	
1974	CBB Championship	Bates won with an 18–7 win over Bowdoin after a 16–14 victory over Colby.	Won	
1970	CBB Championship	Bates won with a 21–3 win over Bowdoin after a 14–7 win over Colby.	Won	
1968	CBB Championship	Bates won with a 41–14 win over Bowdoin after a 28–12 victory over Colby.	Won	
1967	CBB Championship	Bates won with a 38–24 victory over Bowdoin after a 38–14 win over Colby.	Won	
1966	CBB Championship	Bates won with a 35–13 win over Bowdoin, after a win over 28-7 Colby.	Won	
1956	Maine State Series	Bates won five straight games to capture the state title.	Won	

=== Men's basketball ===
The men's basketball team is led by head coach Jon Furbush, and in 2015 he led the team to the semi-finals of the NCAA Division III Basketball Championships. He is the youngest head coach in the history of the team and was named the 2014–15 Maine Coach of the Year by the Maine Men's Basketball Coaches and Writers Association.

Year	Competition	Record	Result	Cite
2015	Charlie Ryan Classic Championship	Hosted in Waterville, Maine.	Won	
2015	Naismith Classic Championship	Hosted in Springfield, Massachusetts.	Won	
2014	Babson Invitational	Hosted on the Babson College Campus	Won	
2014	Salem State Holiday Classic Championship	Hosted in Salem, Massachusetts.	Won	
2012	Chuck Resler Tournament Championship	Hosted in Rochester, Massachusetts.	Won	

=== Men's baseball ===
Year	Competition	Record	Result	Cite
2015	RussMatt Invitational	Second game, win over Babson College hosted at Leahey Baseball Pitch in Lewiston, Maine	Won	

=== Men's golf ===
Year	Competition	Record	Result	Cite
2015	CBB Tournament	At the Martindale C.C. in Auburn, Maine, first out of 3 DIII schools	Won	
2014	Maine State Championship	At the Bangor Municipal G.C. in Bangor, Maine	Won	
2014	CBB Tournament	At the Waterville G.C. in Waterville, Maine, first out of 3 DIII schools	Won	
2012	Sid Farr Invitational	At the Waterville G.C. in Waterville, Maine. Score: 5–5	Won	

=== Men's lacrosse ===
The men's lacrosse team is led by head coach, Dan Annino. Peter Lasagna was head for the past 22 seasons. In 2015, Lasagna won a third NESCAC Coach of the Year and led the Bobcats to five appearances in the NESCAC Championship. In 2015, the team reported 156 points scored, ranking them 6th in-conference, and 5th overall.

=== Men's rowing ===
The Men's rowing team is headed by Peter Steenstra, who was awarded the 2015 Division III Coach of the Year Award by the College Rowing Coaches Association, after also receiving Men's and Women's Coach of the Year honors from both the New England Small College Athletic Conference (NESCAC) and the Eastern College Athletic Conference (ECAC). Alumni, Andrew Byrnes (class of 2005), won the Olympic Gold Medal while rowing for the Canadian National Team, in 2008 in the Beijing Olympics.

Year	Competition	Record	Result	Cite
2016	President's Cup Regatta	Final: 1st out of 3, in Green, Maine	Won	
2015	ECAC/NIRC Regatta	Final: 10–6	Won	
2015	President's Cup Regatta	Final: 8–6	Won	
2015	ECAC National Invitational Rowing Championship	Lead the athletic conference.	Won	
2015	Bates' Invitational	Final: 12–1	Won	
2015	NESCAC Men's Rowing Championship	First top ten breakthrough	Won	
2014	CBB Chase Regatta	Final: 7–2	Won	
2013	New England Rowing Championship	In Worcester, Massachusetts	Won	
2011	CBB Chase Regatta	Final: 1/2	Won	
2011	Quinsigamond Regatta	Placed 3rd out of 24 boats	Won	
2011	President's Cup Regatta	The college's first President's Cup Regatta win	Won	
2010	Quinsigamond Regatta	The first placing at the Quinsigamond Regatta, and first appearance.	Won	
2010	CBB Chase Regatta	Final: 1/2	Won	

=== Men's tennis ===
Year	Competition	Record	Result	Cite
2009	NCAA Division III Tennis Doubles Championship	Hosted in Claremont, California. The men's team also made it to the finals for singles tennis in 2009.	Won	
1988	NESCAC Men's Tennis Championship	The first and most recent conference win for tennis.	Won	

=== Men's rugby ===
Year	Competition	Record	Result	Cite
1997	National Rugby Championship	The team has made it to regionals or nationals all but one year.	Won	

=== Men's Nordic skiing ===
Year	Competition	Record	Result	Cite
2008	NCAA Skiing Championship	The college's Nordic skiing team sent students that were the highest ranked skiers in the Eastern Intercollegiate Ski Association	4th	

=== Men's cross country ===
Year	Competition	Record	Result	Cite
1989	NESCAC Men's Cross Country Championship	The conclusion of the streak starting from 1983, was the record streak until William's 00' streak. The fifth consecutive win of any NESCAC college.	Won	
1986	NESCAC Men's Cross Country Championship	The fourth consecutive win of any NESCAC college.	Won	
1985	NESCAC Men's Cross Country Championship	The third consecutive win of any NESCAC college.	Won	
1984	NESCAC Men's Cross Country Championship	The second consecutive win of any NESCAC college.	Won	
1983	NESCAC Men's Cross Country Championship	The first overall NESCAC win for men's cross-country.	Won	

=== Men's track & field ===
Year	Competition	Record	Result	Cite
2016	Maine State Men's Outdoor Championship	This is the first 7 time back-to-back consecutive win of any college in this competition.	Won	
2016	Bates' Invitational	1st out of 5 Division III schools.	Won	
2015	Maine State Men's Outdoor Championship	1st out of 5 Division III schools.	Won	
2015	Bates' Invitational	1st out of 5 Division III schools.	Won	
2015	Maine State Meet	1st out of 5 Division III schools.	Won	
2015	New England Division III Outdoor Championship	2nd out of 29 Division III schools.	2nd place	
2015	New England Division III Indoor Championship	2nd out of 26 Division III schools.	2nd place	
2014	Maine State Men's Outdoor Championship	1st out of 5 Division III schools.	Won	
2014	Maine State Men's Outdoor Championship	1st out of 5 Division III schools.	Won	
2013	Maine State Men's Outdoor Championship	1st out of 5 Division III schools.	Won	
2013	Tufts Invitational	1st out of 10 Division III schools.	Won	
2013	Maine State Championship	1st out of 5 Division III schools.	Won	
2013	New England Division III Indoor Championship	2nd out of 26 Division III schools.	2nd place	
2013	New England Division III Outdoor Championship	2nd out of 26 Division III schools.	2nd place	
2013	ECAC Division III Outdoor Championship	1st out of 59 Division III schools.	Won	
2012	USM Invitational	1st out of 8 Division III schools.	Won	
2012	New England Division III Outdoor Championship	1st out of 26 Division III schools.	Won	
2012	Maine State Men's Outdoor Championship	1st out of 5 Division III schools.	Won	
2012	NESCAC Men's Track & Field Championship	The 12 years that transpired between the college's first win is the longest time a college has won a title, after its first win, in the NESCAC.	Won	
2012	ECAC Division III Indoor Championship	1st out of 62 Division III schools.	Won	
2012	ECAC Division III Outdoor Championship	1st out of 59 Division III schools.	Won	
2011	Maine State Men's Indoor Championship	1st out of 4 Division III schools.	Won	
2011	Maine State Men's Outdoor Championship	1st out of 5 Division III schools.	Won	
2011	USM Invitational	1st out of 5 Division III schools.	Won	
2011	Bates Invitational	1st out of 5 Division III schools.	Won	
2011	Colby Invitational	1st out of 5 Division III schools.	Won	
2011	NESCAC Men's Track & Field Championship	2nd out of 11 Division III schools in the NESCAC.	2nd place	
2011	ECAC Division III Outdoor Championship	1st out of 59 Division III schools.	Won	
2010	Maine State Men's Outdoor Championship	This was the highest scoring championship game in its history (300-2 aggr. score.)	Won	
2010	USM Invitational	1st out of 6 Division III schools.	Won	
2000	NESCAC Men's Track & Field Championship	The college's first NESCAC title for track& field.	Won	

=== Men's squash ===
Year	Competition	Record	Result	Cite
2016	NESCAC Men's Squash Championship	The competition has been won by Trinity College for every year it has been in the athletic conference, competing against Williams College for first spot. In 2016, breaking the pattern, Bates defeated Williams and secured the second place after a loss to Trinity.	2nd place	
2015	National Squash Championship	The winning student being the first in the history of the athletic conference, to be named the All American all four years he played for the college.	Won	
2015	DIII Men's Individual Squash Championship	The first national squash title for the college.	Won	
2015	Boston Round Robin	vs. Stanford University held at Harvard University, in Cambridge, Massachusetts. Score: 9 – 0; vs. Wesleyan University, Score: 9 – 0	Won	
2015	Pioneer Valley Invitational	vs. Amherst College in Amherst, Massachusetts. Score: 8–1	Won	
2014	CSA Individual Squash Championship	vs. Columbia University, at Princeton University, in Princeton, New Jersey. Score: 3–2	Won	
2013	CSA Team Squash Championship	vs. Williams College, at Northeastern University, in Boston. Score: 6–3	Won	
2012	Boston Round Robin	vs. Wesleyan University, at Massachusetts Institute of Technology, in Boston. Score: 5–4	Won	
2011	CSA Team Squash Championship	vs. Brown University, at Princeton University, in Princeton, New Jersey. Score: 7–2	Won	

== Women's sports ==
=== Women's rowing ===
The Women's Rowing team is headed by Peter Steenstra, who was awarded the 2015 Division III Coach of the Year Award by the College Rowing Coaches Association, after also receiving Men's and Women's Coach of the Year honors from both the New England Small College Athletic Conference (NESCAC) and the Eastern College Athletic Conference (ECAC). The women's rowing team is the first rowing team to sweep every major rowing competition in its athletic conference in the history of Division III athletics, a feat completed in 2015. According to U.S. Rowing, the Women's Rowing Team is ranked 1st in the New England Small College Athletic Conference, and 1st overall in NCAA Division III Rowing, as of 2016.

Year	Competition	Record	Result	Cite
2023	New England Rowing Championship	1st out of 25 teams	Won	
2016	ECAC National Invitational Rowing Championship	Placed 2nd out of 21 boats	2nd place	-
2016	President's Cup Regatta	Final: 1st out of 3, in Green, Maine	Won	
2015	NCAA Division III Women's Rowing Championship	At the Sacramento State Aquatic Center.	Won	
2015	NESCAC Women's Rowing Championship	This is the first consecutive win of the championship.	Won	
2015	New England Rowing Championship	Final: 7–1	Won	
2015	ECAC National Invitational Rowing Championship	Lead the athletic conference.	Won	
2015	President's Cup Regatta	Final: 11–1	Won	
2015	Head of the Charles Regatta	1st out of 30 teams	Won	
2015	Bates' Invitational	Final: 12–1	Won	
2014	NESCAC Women's Rowing Championship	The college's first rowing championship.	Won	
2014	Head of the Charles Regatta	1st out of 30 teams	Won	
2014	CBB Chase Regatta	Final: 8–0	Won	
2014	New England Rowing Championship	Placed 2nd out of 28 boats	2nd place	
2014	NCAA Division III Women's Rowing Championship	Indianapolis at Eagle Creek Park	Won	
2013	NCAA Division III Women's Rowing Championship	Placed 2nd out of 28 boats	2nd place	
2012	NCAA Division III Women's Rowing Championship	Placed 2nd out of 6 boats	2nd place	
2011	CBB Chase Regatta	Final: 1/2	Won	
2011	Head of the Charles Regatta	Placed 2nd out of 29 boats	2nd place	
2011	Quinsigamond Regatta	Placed 1st out of 39 boats	Won	
2011	NCAA Division III Women's Rowing Championship	Placed 2nd out of 6 boats	2nd place	
2011	President's Cup Regatta	The college's first President's Cup Regatta win	Won	
2010	CBB Chase Regatta	Final: 1/2	Won	
2010	Quinsigamond Regatta	The college's first Quinsigamond Regatta win	Won	

=== Women's track & field ===
Year	Competition	Record	Result	Cite
2016	Bates' Invitational	1st out of 4 Division III schools.	Won	
2016	Maine State Meet	1st out of 6 Division III schools, at Bowdoin College, in Brunswick, Maine.	Won	
2015	Bates' Invitational	1st out of 6 Division III schools.	Won	
2015	USM Invitational	2nd out of 10 Division III schools.	2nd place	
2015	Aloha Relays	2nd out of 8 Division III schools, at Bowdoin College, in Brunswick, Maine.	2nd place	
2015	Maine State Meet	1st out of 6 Division III schools, at Bates College, in Lewiston, Maine.	Won	
2014	Bates' Invitational	1st out of 6 Division III schools.	Won	
2014	USM Invitational	2nd out of 11 Division III schools.	2nd place	
2015	Snowflake Classic	2nd out of 24 DIII schools, at Tufts University, in Medford, Massachusetts.	2nd place	
2014	Maine State Indoor Championship	1st out of 6 Division III schools.	Won	
2013	Bates' Invitational	1st out of 6 Division III schools.	Won	
2013	Maine State Championship	2nd out of 6 DIII schools, at Bowdoin College, in Brunswick, Maine.	2nd place	
2013	Aloha Relays	2nd out of 7 Division III schools, at Bowdoin College, in Brunswick, Maine.	2nd place	
2013	Fitchburg State Meet	1st out of 11 Division III schools, in Fitchburg, Massachusetts.	Won	
2012	Colby Invitational	2nd out of 5 Division III schools.	2nd place	
2012	Maine State Indoor Championship	2nd out of 6 Division III schools.	2nd place	
2011	Colby Invitational	2nd out of 5 Division III schools.	2nd place	
2010	USM Invitational	1st out of 6 Division III schools.	Won	

=== Women's squash ===
Year	Competition	Record	Result	Cite
2016	Walker Cup	vs. Amherst College, in New Haven, Connecticut. Score: 5–4	Won	
2015	Boston Round Robin	vs. Wesleyan University, at Harvard University, in Cambridge, Massachusetts. Score: 6–3	Won	

=== Women's soccer ===
Year	Competition	Record	Result	Cite
2005	NESCAC Women's Soccer Championship	4-2 win over Tufts with 2 uses of OT	Won	

=== Women's basketball ===
The 2004 women's basketball team was ranked first in the United States for most of February 2005 and finished the year ranked number six by the USA Today/ESPN Today 25 National Coaches' Poll. The women's basketball team earned the top seed in the NESCAC in 2005, and competed in the finals with Bowdoin for three consecutive years until 2008.

=== Women's cross country ===
Year	Competition	Record	Result	Cite
2014	Bowdoin Invitational	At Bowdoin College, in Brunswick, Maine, 1st out of 7	Won	
2013	Roy Griak Invitational	2nd out of 29 Division III schools, in St. Paul, Minnesota.	2nd place	
2013	Maine State Championship	1st out of 10 Division III schools, in Waterville, Maine.	Won	
2012	RPI Invitational	1st out of 12 Division III schools, in Troy, New York.	Won	
2012	Maine State Championship	1st out of 10 Division III schools, at the Narragansett School in Gotham, Maine	Won	
2010	Codfish Bowl	1st out of 21 Division III schools, in Franklin Park, Boston	Won	

== Club sports ==
=== Volleyball ===
Year	Competition	Record	Result	Cite
1993	NESCAC Volleyball Championship	The winning streak is tied with Williams College for four consecutive wins.	Won	
1992	NESCAC Volleyball Championship		Won	
1991	NESCAC Volleyball Championship		Won	
1990	NESCAC Volleyball Championship	The first overall NESCAC win for volleyball.	Won	

=== Ice hockey ===
As of 2016, the men's club ice hockey team is ranked #5 in the Northeast, and #25 overall in the NESCHA rankings.

Year	Competition	Record	Result	Cite
2009	NESCAC Club Ice Hockey Championship	The win marks the fourth consecutive win of the championship.	Won	
2009	NECHA Cup	The second win of the cup for the college.	Won	
2008	NESCAC Club Ice Hockey Championship	The win marks the third consecutive win of the championship.	Won	
2008	NECHA Cup	The first win of the cup by the college.	Won	
2007	NESCAC Club Ice Hockey Championship	The win marks the second consecutive win of the championship.	Won	
2006	NESCAC Club Ice Hockey Championship	The first time the college has ever won an ice hockey championship.	Won	

=== Sailing team ===
The college's sailing team is based at the Taylor Pond Yacht Club, in Auburn, Maine. The team sails in the New England Intercollegiate Sailing Association (NEISA) conference with its main competitors being Bowdoin, Tufts, and Massachusetts Institute of Technology, among the other 40 schools in the conference.

Year	Competition	Record	Result	Cite
2018	New England Dinghy Tournament (NEISA Club Team Championship)		1st place	
2004	NCAA National Sailing Championship	Second to Hamilton College	2nd place	
2003	NCAA National Sailing Championship	Second to Bowdoin College	2nd place	
2002	NCAA National Sailing Championship	Second to Amherst College	2nd place	
2001	NCAA National Sailing Championship	Second to Williams College	2nd place	
2000	NCAA National Sailing Championship	Second to Amherst College	2nd place	

== Olympians ==
As of 2026, the college has graduated a total of 12 Olympians, one of whom won the Olympic Gold Medal rowing for Canada.

Years	Competition	Record	Country	Cite
2018 – present	Dinos Lefkaritis	N/A	Cyprus	
2014 – present	Emily Bamford	Quarterfinals	Australia	
2012 – present	Andrew Byrnes	Gold	Canada	
2010 – present	Hayley Johnson	Quarterfinals	United States	
2006 –present	Justin Freeman	Quarterfinals	United States	
2000–2005	Mike Ferry	Quarterfinals	United States	
1988–1995	Nancy Fiddler	Quarterfinals	United States	
1926–1933	Arnold Adams	Quarterfinals	United States	
1932–1939	Art Sager	N/A	United States	
1924–1920	Ray Buker	Quarterfinals	United States	
1912–1920	Harlan Holden	Quarterfinals	Sweden	
1912–1920	Vaughn Blanchard	Quarterfinals	United States	

== Athletic facilities ==
Venue	Capacity	Sport	Year	Notes	Cite
Alumni Gymnasium	1,200	Basketball, Volleyball	1928	The Alumni Gymnasium is 34,000 square feet.	
Merrill Gymnasium	N/A	Track & Field	1980	The field house has a 200-meter track which encloses four tennis and volleyball courts.	
Russell Street Track & Field	N/A	Track & Field, Soccer	2001	The track has an eight-lane European bi-radial track with a 10-lane straightaway.	
Bates Squash Center	N/A	Squash	2004	The center features five international-sized courts.	
Wallach Tennis Center	500	Tennis	2000	The center is used for men's and women's tennis.	
Campus Avenue Field	N/A	Field hockey, Lacrosse	2000	The Campus Avenue has internal lighting structures allowing play day or night.	
Garcelon Field	3,000	Soccer, Football	2010	The field was originally constructed in 1899, and is one of the oldest football pitches in the United States; it had a major renovation in 2010.	
Clifton Daggett Gray Athletic Building	N/A	Multi-purpose	1927	Informally known as the "Gray Cage", the building is the second largest athletic facility on campus, which has a batting cage and room for a full infield baseball practice.	
Davis Fitness Center	N/A	Fitness	1926	Full service weight room located beneath Underhill Ice Arena.	
Leahey Baseball Pitch	N/A	Baseball	2003	Outdoor baseball field.	
Lafayette Street Pitch	N/A	Softball	2001	Outdoor softball field.	
Underhill Arena Ice Rink	N/A	Ice hockey	1995	The ice rink features "a 200-by-85-foot ice surface."	
Rowing Boathouse	N/A	Rowing	1988	Houses women's and men's rowing teams.	
Tarbell Pool	300	Swimming & Diving	1980	The pool features "eight lanes and an underwater window, and can be configured into 25-meter or 25-yard lane lengths."	
Sailing Boathouse	N/A	Sailing	2003	The boat houses the college's 13 Dinghy fleet.	
