= The Real HU =

American college football rivalry

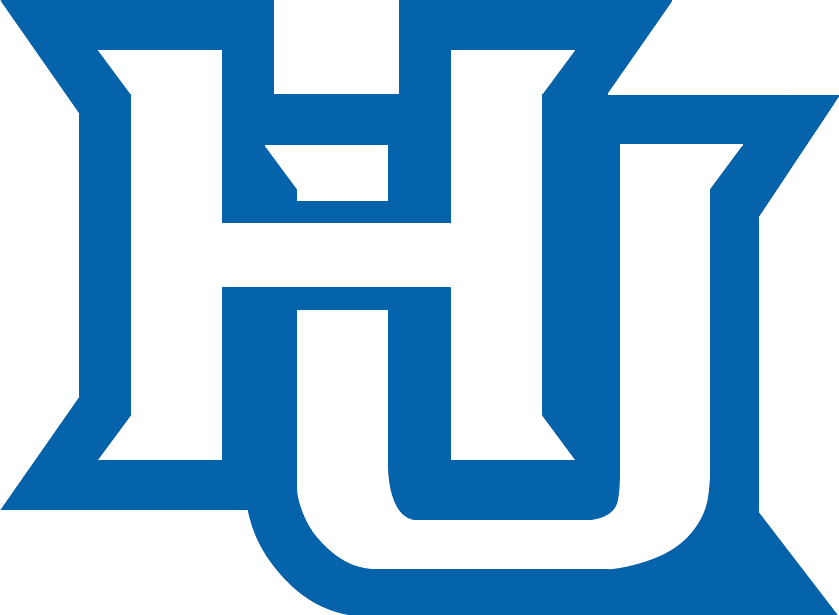
- Hampton Pirates Howard Bison
- Sport: Football
- First meeting: 1908; Hampton 6, Howard 0
- Latest meeting: October 3, 2026; Howard 27, Hampton 13

Statistics
- Total meetings: 101
- All-time series: Hampton leads, 55–45–1
- Largest victory: Hampton, 52–2 (2002); Howard, 51–0 (1973)
- Longest win streak: Hampton, 14 (1997–2010); Howard, 12 (1969–1980)
- Current win streak: Howard, 2 (2025–present)

Locations of Hampton and Howard

The Real HU is an American college football rivalry game played annually by the Bison of Howard University and the Pirates of Hampton University. The series started in 1908 and is driven by several factors, which include the close proximity of the two Mid-Atlantic schools, the historically high academic standing of both these private institutions as Howard and Hampton are considered Black Ivy League universities and have student-alumni populations from similar backgrounds, and that the two schools have competed in the same athletic conferences for approximately a century.

Previously the two schools competed in the Central Intercollegiate Athletic Association (CIAA) and Mid-Eastern Athletic Conference (MEAC). On November 16, 2017, Hampton announced that they were becoming a member of the Big South Conference in 2018. Due to scheduling reasons, Hampton was to remain in the MEAC for 2018, but the MEAC refused to allow Hampton to play MEAC opponents in 2018, as punishment for leaving the MEAC for the Big South. The rivalry resumed in 2019, with Hampton facing Howard on September 14 in the 22nd Annual Chicago Football Classic at Soldier Field.

The annual football contest has primarily been played at the two respective campus facilities: Armstrong Stadium for Hampton, and Howard's Greene Stadium, although the contest has been played at other locations such as Polo Grounds in New York City, old Giants Stadium in East Rutherford, New Jersey, RFK Stadium in Washington, DC and Audi Field also in Washington, DC.

== President Obama's "Real HU" remarks ==
The rivalry is well-known and has been referenced by President Barack Obama. During his 2010 commencement address at Hampton, President Obama quipped, "Now, before we get started, I just want to say, I’m excited the Battle of the Real H.U. will be taking place in Washington this year. (laughter) You know I am not going to pick sides. (laughter) But my understanding is it's been 13 years since the Pirates lost. (applause) As one Hampton alum on my staff put it, the last time Howard beat Hampton, The Fugees were still together." At the time, Hampton was in the midst of a series long 14-game win streak.

== Vice President Kamala Harris ==
U.S. Vice President Kamala Harris attended the 2021 Football Game between Howard & Hampton. Vice President Harris is a Howard University Alum, Class of 1986.

Hampton won the game 48–32.

== Game results ==
Hampton victories	Howard victories	Tie games	Vacated wins

No.	Date	Location	Winner	Score
1	1908		Howard	2–0
2	November 13, 1909	Hampton, VA	Howard	5–0
3	November 19, 1910	Washington, D.C.	Howard	32–0
4	October 19, 1911		Howard	11–0
5	November 9, 1912	Washington, D.C.	Howard	13–7
6	1913		Hampton	8–6
7	November 26, 1914	Washington, D.C.	Howard	6–0
8	1915		Hampton	18–0
9	November 30, 1916	Washington, D.C.	Hampton	12–3
10	November 29, 1917	Hampton, VA	Hampton	37–0
11	1918		Hampton	6–2
12	1919		Howard	12–7
13	November 13, 1920	Washington, D.C.	Howard	18–0
14	November 5, 1921	Hampton, VA	Howard	34–0
15	November 18, 1922	Washington, D.C.	Hampton	13–0
16	November 17, 1923	Hampton, VA	Howard	19–6
17	November 15, 1924	Washington, D.C.	Hampton	13–0
18	October 5, 1929	Hampton, VA	Hampton	6–0
19	November 15, 1930	Hampton, VA	Hampton	13–6
20	November 14, 1931	Washington, D.C.	Hampton	25–0
21	November 12, 1932	New York City, NY	Hampton	19–6
22	November 11, 1933	Washington, D.C.	Hampton	28–0
23	November 11, 1934	Hampton, VA	Howard	7–0
24	November 9, 1935	Washington, D.C.	Hampton	26–0
25	November 7, 1936	Hampton, VA	Hampton	35–0
26	November 6, 1937	Washington, D.C.	Howard	13–6
27	November 5, 1938	Hampton, VA	Hampton	13–12
28	November 11, 1939	Washington, D.C.	Hampton	25–6
29	November 9, 1940	Hampton, VA	Hampton	25–0
30	November 8, 1941	Washington, D.C.	Hampton	19–6
31	November 7, 1942	Hampton, VA	Hampton	12–0
32	November 11, 1944	Hampton, VA	Hampton	7–0
33	November 10, 1945	Washington, D.C.	Howard	19–6
34	November 9, 1946	Hampton, VA	Howard	9–6
35	November 8, 1947	Washington, D.C.	Hampton	19–13
36	November 6, 1948	Hampton, VA	Howard	6–0
37	November 5, 1949	Washington, D.C.	Howard	7–0
38	November 4, 1950	Hampton, VA	Howard	12–7
39	November 3, 1951	Washington, D.C.	Howard	7–0
40	November 8, 1952	Hampton, VA	Hampton	34–7
41	November 7, 1953	Washington, D.C.	Howard	11–7
42	November 6, 1954	Hampton, VA	Tie	13–13
43	November 5, 1955	Washington, D.C.	Hampton	14–0
44	November 3, 1956	Hampton, VA	Hampton	20–0
45	November 9, 1957	Washington, D.C.	Hampton	19–6
46	November 8, 1958	Hampton, VA	Howard	18–12
47	November 7, 1959	Washington, D.C.	Howard	14–7
48	November 5, 1960	Hampton, VA	Hampton	24–20
49	October 28, 1961	Washington, D.C.	Hampton	37–0
50	October 27, 1962	Hampton, VA	Hampton	33–14
51	November 2, 1963	Washington, D.C.	Howard	32–14

No.	Date	Location	Winner	Score
52	October 31, 1964	Hampton, VA	Howard	14–6
53	October 30, 1965	Washington, D.C.	Howard	26–8
54	October 29, 1966	Hampton, VA	Hampton	32–19
55	October 28, 1967	Washington, D.C.	Hampton	14–8
56	November 2, 1968	Hampton, VA	Hampton	37–6
57	November 1, 1969	Washington, D.C.	Howard	16–0
58	October 31, 1970	Hampton, VA	Howard	41–14
59	October 30, 1971	Washington, D.C.	Howard	35–0
60	October 28, 1972	Hampton, VA	Howard	21–3
61	October 27, 1973	Washington, D.C.	Howard	51–0
62	November 2, 1974	Hampton, VA	Howard	27–12
63	November 1, 1975	Washington, D.C.	Howard	19–15
64	October 30, 1976	Hampton, VA	Howard	28–7
65	October 29, 1977	Washington, D.C.	Howard	20–14
66	October 28, 1978	Hampton, VA	Howard	17–6
67	October 27, 1979	Washington, D.C.	Howard	28–12
68	November 1, 1980	Hampton, VA	Howard	38–21
69	September 8, 1984	Washington, D.C.	Hampton	13–7
70	September 13, 1986	Hampton, VA	Howard	21–7
71	September 10, 1994	Washington, D.C.	Hampton	21–20
72	September 8, 1995	Washington, D.C.	Howard	34–22
73	September 13, 1996	Washington, D.C.	Howard	26–7
74	September 13, 1997	East Rutherford, NJ	Hampton	49–21
75	September 12, 1998	Washington, D.C.	Hampton	38–31
76	September 11, 1999	Washington, D.C.	Hampton	28–27
77	September 9, 2000	East Rutherford, NJ	Hampton	28–24
78	September 8, 2001	Washington, D.C.	Hampton	27–20
79	September 14, 2002	Hampton, VA	Hampton	51–2
80	September 13, 2003	Washington, D.C.	Hampton	17–14
81	September 11, 2004	Hampton, VA	Hampton	47–14
82	September 10, 2005	Washington, D.C.	Hampton	22–12
83	September 9, 2006	Hampton, VA	Hampton	46–7
84	September 8, 2007	Washington, D.C.	Hampton	31–24
85	September 13, 2008	Hampton, VA	Hampton	38–27
86	October 13, 2009	Hampton, VA	Hampton	37–0
87	September 11, 2010	Washington, D.C.	Hampton	31–21
88	November 5, 2011	Hampton, VA	Howard	10–7
89	November 3, 2012	Washington, D.C.	Howard	20–10
90	November 23, 2013	Hampton, VA	Howard	42–39
91	November 22, 2014	Washington, D.C.	Howard	30–29
92	September 18, 2015	Washington, D.C.	Hampton	37–19
93	September 17, 2016	Washington, D.C.	Hampton	34–7
94	November 18, 2017	Hampton, VA	Hampton	20–17
95	September 14, 2019	Chicago, IL	Hampton	41–20
96	September 18, 2021	Washington, D.C.	Hampton	48–32
97	September 3, 2022	Hampton, VA	Hampton	31–28
98	September 16, 2023	Washington, D.C.	Hampton	35–34
99	September 21, 2024	Washington, D.C.	Hampton	27–20
100	September 20, 2025	Washington, D.C.	Howard	34–7
101	October 3, 2026	Washington, D.C.	Howard	27–13
Series: Hampton leads 55–45–1

== See also ==
- List of NCAA college football rivalry games
- List of most-played college football series in NCAA Division I
- List of black college football classics
