= Black Ivy League =

Term for some US historically black colleges

The Black Ivy League refers to a segment of the historically black colleges (HBCUs) in the United States that attract the majority of high-performing or affluent black students.

The actual Ivy League is an eight-member athletic conference, however, Black Ivy schools are neither organized as an official group nor affiliated with the NCAA Ivy League sports conference. At one point in history, some of these institutions debated forming a Black Ivy League athletic conference, but did not reach an agreement. Similar other terms include: Public Ivies, Southern Ivies, and the Little Ivies among others, none of which have canonical definitions. Generally, the institutions themselves avoid using the term Black Ivy to describe themselves.

== Members ==
There is no agreement as to which schools are included in the "Black Ivy League", and sources list different possible members. The 1984 book Blacks in Colleges by Jacqueline Fleming states that the schools that make up the Black Ivy league are (in no particular order):

- Fisk University
- Hampton University
- Howard University
- Morehouse College
- Spelman College
- Tuskegee University
- Dillard University

Fleming further notes that "[t]he presence of Black Ivy League colleges pull the best and most privileged black students... [A]ll seven are unique schools, with little overlap among them."

Bill Maxwell, in a 2003 series on Historically Black Colleges and Universities (HBCUs), coincides with Fleming in describing the Black Ivy League institutions as being those seven.

The North Star News described Fisk, Hampton, Howard, Morehouse, Tuskegee as well as Cheyney University of Pennsylvania and Morgan State University as the equivalent of a Black Ivy League. Lincoln University has also been mentioned as being included in the group.

In 1976, the Chicago Tribune referred to the schools of the Atlanta University Center (Morehouse, Spelman, Atlanta University and Clark College [the latter merged and became Clark Atlanta University], Morris Brown College, and Interdenominational Theological Center) as a veritable group of Black Ivies.

== Description and legacy ==
Although there is a debate about the composition of the group, they shared certain historic characteristics. During the late 20th century, students who attended these schools were able to learn trades and acquire skills and status which put them in a distinctly different social class of black Americans. While these institutions were the favorites for upper-class blacks who chose to attend HBCUs prior to 1970, after 1970, a larger number of affluent blacks decided to attend predominantly white colleges and universities. Many of these students recreated and patronized "HBCU experiences" at their predominately white institutions.

Six of these institutions are located in the South, while Howard, Hampton, Lincoln, Cheyney, and Morgan are located in the Mid-Atlantic states.

Each of these institutions are co-educational with the exception of Morehouse College, which is an all-male institution and Spelman College, an all-female institution. All institutions are currently accredited by such organizations as the Middle States Association of Colleges and Schools and Southern Association of Colleges and Schools.

== History ==
The founding of two members, Lincoln University and Cheyney University of Pennsylvania, predate the American Civil War. The remaining members were founded in the late 19th century except for Xavier University of Louisiana, which was founded in 1915 by Saint Katharine Drexel.

During the relevant time period, these institutions upheld a tradition of academic excellence. In 1952, Fisk was the first historically black institution to charter a chapter of Phi Beta Kappa. Morehouse continues to be the top baccalaureate-origin institutions of black men who earned doctoral degrees. Howard continually leads all universities in producing the highest number of black doctorate recipients and has the highest endowment of any HBCU in the nation. Spelman College has consistently been recognized as one of the top ten women's college in the nation. George Washington Carver conducted many of his noteworthy peanut experiments while a professor at Tuskegee. Similarly, the largest percentage of African-Americans holding graduate and professional degrees, attended these colleges as undergraduates. From 1897 – 1909, W.E.B. Du Bois conducted the Atlanta University Studies, a “systematic, social-scientific inquiries into the condition and lives of African Americans” and penned The Souls of Black Folk (1903) “perhaps the most influential work of his generation on the African American experience” during his first term as a professor of economics, history and sociology at what was at the time Atlanta University (now Clark Atlanta). Dubois left Atlanta University in 1909, the same year that he co-founded the NAACP and returned to Atlanta University in 1934, where he published his last major work, Black Reconstruction in America (1935) and remained until his retirement in 1944.

=== Current status ===
Prior to the 1960s, all majority-white southern colleges and universities excluded people of color. During that era, a handful of black elite schools attracted the best African-American students and faculty. However, since the 1960s, these institutions have had great difficulty in competing with Ivy League and other historically white colleges for top students and faculty The North Star News notes, "As Blacks enrolled in predominantly white colleges and southern states did not invest in Black colleges, HBCU’s were put at a distinct disadvantage. Today, many of these institutions are struggling to keep pace with white institutions in terms of course offerings, facilities, athletics, and student services." Yet, Black Ivy League schools enroll more black National Merit Scholars than elite schools, such as Harvard, Yale, and Stanford, perhaps because these students have financial aid independent of the school they attend. As reported by The Washington Post, "Top-tier schools—including Howard, Hampton University, and Spelman and Morehouse colleges—vie with Harvard and Princeton for top black students and faculty."

Morehouse College drew national publicity in 2008, when its valedictorian, Joshua Packwood, a white student, explained that he opted to attend Morehouse, when he had received full scholarship offers from both Morehouse and Columbia University.

The relative size of the institutions and their respective endowments also affect each school's relative ability to provide elite instruction. For example, Cornell University's freshman class included 371 black and multiracial students, which is more than the freshman class of Dillard. From 1999 to 2007, Ivy League colleges launched initiatives to make higher education more affordable, to the point that students from low income families can graduate debt-free. The University of Pennsylvania has expanded its financial aid program to the point that all students qualifying for financial aid can graduate debt-free. The Journal of Blacks in Higher Education notes that the significant increase in financial aid by Harvard and other Ivy League schools will make it difficult for other schools to compete for top African-American students. A study of the average wages of alumni conducted by Roland G. Fryer Jr. and Michael Greenstone, found that between the 1970s and the 1990s, "there is a wage penalty" in attending a HBCU over those attending historically white colleges, "resulting in a 20% decline in the relative wages of HBCU graduates between the two decades."

Unlike the Ivy League, the main focus of the Black Ivy League has been on undergraduate education. However, Howard University has several graduate-level professional programs, including a medical school, and Morehouse at one time had its own medical school, which has since become the independent Morehouse School of Medicine. There are two other historically black medical schools not affiliated with Black Ivy League-identified colleges, located in Nashville, Tennessee, and Los Angeles, California. As of 2003, these four medical schools "reportedly account[ed] for more than half of all Black medical school graduates" in the United States. Tuskegee has had a School of Veterinary Medicine since the 1930s and began awarding PhDs in the 1980s.

Regarding extension and outreach, many of the HBCUs which are not in the Black Ivy League are land grant universities, founded in response to the Second Morrill Act of 1890. As a result, those institutions receive annual federal and state appropriations to conduct extension activities, which are not available to the Black Ivy League schools, except for Tuskegee University, which began to receive Cooperative Extension funding in 1972. However, the Black Ivy League schools have received Part B federal aid under the Higher Education Act of 1965 as HBCUs.

== See also ==
- Historically Black Colleges and Universities (HBCUs)
- List of black college football classics
