= NCAA Division III rowing championship =

American collegiate rowing tournament

- Association: NCAA
- Sport: College rowing
- Founded: 2002; 24 years ago
- Division: Division III
- No. of teams: 8
- Country: United States
- Most recent champion: Tufts (3rd)
- Most titles: Williams (9)
- Website: NCAA.com

The NCAA Division III rowing championship is the annual rowing regatta hosted by the National Collegiate Athletic Association to determine the champions of women's collegiate heavyweight (or openweight) rowing among its Division III member programs in the United States.

The most successful program has been Williams, with nine titles.

Tufts are the defending champions, winning their third national title in 2026.

== Format ==
Each championship tournament consists of eight teams, and each team is required to field two boats of eight rowers and a coxswain.

The following are the berths that are allocated:

- Pool A – four (Pool A consists of conferences that have been awarded automatic qualification ("AQ")):
  - Liberty League
  - Mid-Atlantic Rowing Conference
  - New England Small College Athletic Conference
  - New England Women's and Men's Athletic Conference
- Pool B/C – four (Pools B and C include independents, institutions from conferences that do not meet automatic-qualification standards, and Pool A institutions that did not receive their conference’s AQ). Independents and institutions from conferences that do not meet AQ standards are:
  - Massachusetts Maritime Academy
  - D’Youville College
  - Sarah Lawrence College
  - State University of New York Maritime College
  - Lewis & Clark College
  - Mills College
  - Pacific University
  - Pacific Lutheran University
  - University of Puget Sound

== Results ==
NCAA Division III Rowing Championships
| Year | Site (Host Team) | Team Results | | | |
| Year | Site (Host Team) | Champion | Score | Runner-up | Score |
|---|---|---|---|---|---|
| 2002; Details | Indianapolis, IN | Williams | 9 | Colby | 11 |
| 2003; Details | Indianapolis, IN | Colby | 10 | Puget Sound | 12 |
| 2004; Details | Gold River, CA | Ithaca | 7 | Smith | 10 |
| 2005; Details | Gold River, CA | Ithaca (2) | 10 | Smith | 10 |
| 2006; Details | West Windsor, NJ | Williams (2) | 21 | Ithaca | 15 |
| 2007; Details | Oak Ridge, TN | Williams (3) | 18 | Trinity (CT) | 16 |
| 2008; Details | Gold River, CA | Williams (4) | 25 | Trinity (CT) | 21 |
| 2009; Details | Cherry Hill, NJ | Williams (5) | 24 | Bates | 19 |
| 2010; Details | Gold River, CA | Williams (6) | 26 | Bates | 19 |
| 2011; Details | Gold River, CA | Williams (7) | 19 | Bates | 16 |
| 2012; Details | West Windsor, NJ | Williams (8) | 42 | Bates | 37 |
| 2013; Details | Indianapolis, IN | Williams (9) | 43 | Bates | 35 |
| 2014; Details | Indianapolis, IN | Trinity (CT) | 40 | Williams | 33 |
| 2015; Details | Gold River, CA | Bates | 39 | Trinity (CT) | 38 |
| 2016; Details | Gold River, CA | Wellesley | 40 | Bates | 36 |
| 2017; Details | West Windsor, NJ | Bates (2) | 39 | Williams | 38 |
| 2018; Details | Sarasota, FL | Bates (3) | 56 | Wellesley | 45 |
| 2019; Details | Indianapolis, IN | Bates (4) | 46 | WPI | 41 |
| 2020 | Cancelled due to the coronavirus pandemic | | | | |
| 2021; Details | Sarasota, FL | Bates (5) | 42 | Hamilton | 33 |
| 2022; Details | Sarasota, FL | Wellesley (2) | 51 | Bates | 50 |
| 2023; Details | Pennsauken, NJ (Temple) | Wellesley (3) | 54 | Wesleyan | 45 |
| 2024; Details | Bethel, OH (Marietta) | Tufts | 54 | Wesleyan, Williams | 47 |
| 2025; Details | West Windsor, NJ (Ivy & MAAC) | Tufts (2) | 56 | Williams | 49 |
| 2026; Details | Gainesville, GA (North Georgia) | Tufts (3) | 56 | Bates | 45 |

=== Notes ===
- In 2005, Ithaca and Smith tied in total points for the team title, which was awarded to Ithaca based on a better overall finish in the Varsity 8+ race.
- In 2006 and 2008, Williams won the team title by placing second and third in the grand final.
- In 2015, total points for team title was awarded to Bates, but Trinity won the Varsity 8+ grand final.
- In 2017, Bates again won the team title, although Williams placed first in the Varsity 8+ grand final.
- In 2022, Wellesley won the team title, despite WPI winning the Varsity 8+ grand final.
- In all other years, the winner of the Varsity 8+ race also won the NCAA Division III team title.

== Champions ==
| Team | Titles | Years |
|---|---|---|
| Williams | 9 | 2002, 2006, 2007, 2008, 2009, 2010, 2011, 2012, 2013 |
| Bates | 5 | 2015, 2017, 2018, 2019, 2021 |
| Tufts | 3 | 2024, 2025, 2026 |
| Wellesley | 3 | 2016, 2022, 2023 |
| Ithaca | 2 | 2004, 2005 |
| Trinity (CT) | 1 | 2014 |
| Colby | 1 | 2003 |

== Individual events ==
=== Varsity 8+ ===
| Year | School | Crew |
|---|---|---|
| 2026 | Tufts | Rose Tinkjian (8), Sami Haynes (7), Josie Monroe (6), Sydney Barr (5), Sonia Haynes (4), Aubyn Mackey (3), Saskia Petitt (2), Emma Lyle (1), Hannah Jiang (Cox), Head Coach: Lily Siddall |
| 2025 | Tufts | Rose Tinkjian (8), Sami Haynes (7), Stella Shen (6), Emma Lyle (5), Lucy Howell (4), Reilly Uiterwyk (3), Josie Monroe (2), Sydney Barr (1), Hannah Jiang (Cox), Head Coach: Lily Siddall |
| 2024 | Tufts | Rose Tinkjian (8), Janna Moore (7), Shira Roberts (6), Emma Mahoney (5), Summer Maxwell (4), Samara Haynes (3), Karen Dooley (2), Emma Lyle (1), Hannah Jiang (Cox), Head Coach: Lily Siddall |
| 2023 | Wellesley | Anya Hanichak (8), Anneka Hallstrom (7), Katherine Moeser (6), Kaitlyn Severin (5), Sage Gilbert-Diamond (4), Hannah Bates (3), Emma Anghel (2), Kaylee Liu (1), Isabella Santos (Cox), Head Coach: Tessa Spillane |
| 2022 | WPI | Melissa Bazakas-Chamberlain (8), Alexandra Heline (7), Megan Tupaj (6), Caitlin Kean (5), Jillian Early (4), Maren Cork (3), Emily Adams (2), Ashley Schuliger (1), Logan Rinaldi (Cox) |
| 2021 | Bates | Grace Bake (8), Carla Guichard (7), Sally Harris Porter (6), Hannah Beams (5), Elizabeth Fischer (4), Lillian Kinder (3), Catharine Berry-Toon (2) and Saylor Strugar (1), Elizabeth Folsom (Cox) |
| 2020 | Cancelled due to the coronavirus pandemic | |
| 2019 | Bates | Head coach: Peter Steenstra |
| 2018 | Bates | Head coach: Peter Steenstra |
| 2017 | Williams | Clara Beery (8), Bertie Miller (7), Eileen Russell (6), Gabrielle Markel (5), Rebecca Smith (4), Maddy Boutet (3), Emory Strawn (2), Emily Burch (1), Louisa Abel (cox), Head Coach: Kate Maloney |
| 2016 | Wellesley | Emilia Ball (8), Kathryn Barth (7), Sydney Dollmeyer (6), Loren Lock (5), Molly Hoyer (4), Olivia Duggan (3), Lauren Bazley (2), Katie Livingston (1), Alessandra Zaldívar-Giuffredi (cox), Head Coach: Tessa Spillane |
| 2015 | Trinity | Chanel Erasmus, Kiely MacMahon, Georgia Wetmore, Madeleine Boudreau, Claudia Jensen, Cristina Pretto, Jennifer Sager, Antonia Bowden, Sarah Keane (cox), Head Coach: Wesley Ng |
| 2014 | Trinity | Jillian Zieff (8), Renee Swetz (7), Madeleine Boudreau (6), Kathryn Hibbard (5), Julia Kelling (4), Catherine Guariglia (3), Rose Lichtenfels (2), Claire Barkin (1), Gwendolyn Schoch (cox), Head Coach: Wesley Ng |
| 2013 | Williams | Katie Westervelt, Meg Steer, Andrea Remec, Stephanie Neul, Emma Laukitis, Piper Sallquist, Annie Haley, Dana Golden, Anna Hopkins (cox), Head Coach: Kate Maloney |
| 2012 | Williams | Dana Golden, Annie Haley, Jane McClellan, Lindsay Olsen, Abbie Deal, Emma Pelegri-O'Day, Julia May, Dorothy MacAusland, Fiona Wilkes (cox), Head Coach: Kate Maloney |
| 2011 | Williams | Anna Soybel, Adrienne Darrow, Dana Golden, Annie Haley, Abbie Deal, Lindsay Olsen, Kate Shaper, Emma Pelegri-O'Day, Becca Licht (cox), (Interim) Head Coach: Brad Hemmerly |
| 2010 | Williams | Emma Pelegri-O'Day, Sarah Ginsberg, Madeline Berky, Dana Golden, Lindsay Olsen, Kate Shaper, Dorothy MacAusland, Julia Haltermann, Becca Licht (cox), Head Coach: Justin Moore |
| 2009 | Williams | Julia Haltermann, Emma Pelegri-O'Day, Kate Shaper, Dorothy MacAusland, Meg Conan, Samantha Smith, Sarah Ginsberg, Katherine Robinson, Allison Prevatt (cox), Head Coach: Justin Moore |
| 2008 | Trinity | Ellie Wierzbowski, Amory Minot, Ali Schmidt, Deede Dixon, Ashley Swiggett, Loren Massimino, Carmel Zahran, Natalie Jones, Stephanie Apstein (cox), Head Coach: Wesley Ng |
| 2007 | Williams | Katherine Robinson, Katie Quayle, Carolyn Skudder, Louisa Berky, Kate Sortun, Julia Haltermann, Abby Weir, Emily Cheston, Allison Prevatt (cox), Head Coach: Pat Tynan |
| 2006 | Ithaca | Sarah Kuebler, Emma Flemer, Kaitlin Veninsky, Stephanie Knabe, Kelsey Schaeffer, Stacey Bowen, Jane Semiz, Heather Luke, Melanie Pessin (cox), Head Coach: Becky Robinson |
| 2005 | Trinity | Tara Maciog, Hadley Wilmerding, Elizabeth Guernsey, Sarah Carter, Katie Gordon, Loren Massimino, Ali Schmidt, Carmel Zahran, Emily McLean (cox), Head Coach: Marina Traub |
| 2004 | Ithaca | Jill Moler, Nora Lahr, Jessie Selock, Megan Musnicki, Stephanie Knabe, Stacey Bowen, Heather Luke, Leslie Nichols, Catie Gloo (cox), Head Coach: Becky Robinson |
| 2003 | Colby | Leah Hagamen, Emily Allen, Laura Mistretta, Annie Szender, Leah Robertson, Andrea Piekarski, Megan Loosigian, Ellie Boyce, Vivienne Ho (cox), Head Coach: Stew Stokes |
| 2002 | Williams | Anne Rutherford, Anne Lewis, Liz Mygatt, Rachel DeSouza, Laura Spero, Shoshana Clark, Izzy Lowell, Emma Herries, Rachel Outman (cox), Head Coach: Justin Moore |

== See also ==
- NCAA Division I rowing championship
- NCAA Division II rowing championship
- Intercollegiate Women's Varsity Eights
- Intercollegiate Rowing Association Women's Varsity Lightweight Eights Champions
- http://www.ncaa.com/news/rowing/article/2016-05-28/wellesley-captures-its-first-division-iii-rowing-national-title
