= Ivy Plus =

Term for a group of American universities

In the United States, "Ivy Plus" is an informal term that refers to the Ivy League universities and a small group of non-Ivy private universities regarded as their peers in prestige and academic standing.

== Background ==
The Ivy League is a university athletic league comprising eight universities in the Northeastern United States that, according to U.S. News and World Report, "are considered the most sought-after institutions of higher learning in the country". Its members are Brown University, Cornell University, Columbia University, Dartmouth College, Harvard University, Princeton University, the University of Pennsylvania, and Yale University.

== Included universities ==
The Massachusetts Institute of Technology, Stanford University, Duke University, the University of Chicago, and Johns Hopkins University are the most commonly cited Ivy Plus universities. (Note: Stanford University, UChicago, and MIT are consistently referred to as 'Ivy Plus', while Duke, JHU and others are more variably included) Other institutions such as Northwestern University, Georgetown University, Washington University in St. Louis, and Vanderbilt University, have occasionally been referred to as Ivy Plus or Ivy-calibre.

=== Formal grouping ===
The Ivy Plus Libraries Confederation, an interlibrary loan service maintained by a consortium of university libraries, includes Duke University, Johns Hopkins University, MIT, Stanford University, and the University of Chicago among its non-Ivy League members.

The Ivy Plus Sustainability Consortium, established in 2007 to "advance sustainability in higher education," includes the University of Chicago, Duke University, Georgetown University, Johns Hopkins University, MIT, and Stanford University alongside the eight Ivy League institutions.

The Ivy Plus Exchange Scholars Program, an institutionally-recognized graduate exchange program operated by a consortium of universities, includes the University of California, Berkeley, the University of Chicago, MIT, and Stanford University among its non-Ivy League members.

In 2017, following the United States withdrawal from the Paris Agreement under the first Trump administration, the presidents of eight Ivy League universities, Duke, Georgetown, Johns Hopkins, UChicago and MIT, referring to themselves as the "Ivy Plus Group", co-signed a joint statement to affirm their commitment to tackling climate change.

=== Peer self-selection ===
Since 2005, the U.S. Department of Education's National Center for Education Statistics has published the Integrated Postsecondary Education Data System (IPEDS) Data Feedback Report (DFR), in which each institution of higher education can define a "custom comparison group" for the purpose of "benchmarking and peer analysis." Private non-Ivy colleges considered as peers by at least one member of the Ivy League (Note: Columbia University and Princeton University did not define a custom comparison group for the NCES report) included the University of Chicago, Stanford University, MIT, Johns Hopkins University, Duke University, Washington University in St. Louis, Northwestern University, Vanderbilt University, Rice University, Georgetown University and the University of Rochester.

=== Social club ===
Various "Ivy-plus"-termed alumni events and social clubs have included Carnegie Mellon University, Georgetown University, Northwestern University, Johns Hopkins University, MIT, Stanford, the University of Chicago and others alongside the Ivy League universities.

=== Studies and research ===
A 2023 study by the National Bureau of Economic Research found that, while "less than half of one percent of Americans attend Ivy-Plus colleges", they "account for more than 10 percent of Fortune 500 CEOs, a quarter of U.S. senators, and three-fourths of Supreme Court justices appointed in the last half-century". The study defined "Ivy Plus" as the Ivy League institutions plus Chicago, Duke, MIT, and Stanford.

Since 2023, TIME and Statista has published an annual listicle of "Best Colleges for Future Leaders", which analyzed the alma mater of the "top 2,000 leaders in the U.S.", including "politicians, CEOs, union leaders, Nobel winners, and more across sectors." The list, "which is weighted for school size, is led by so-called Ivy Plus schools," with the Top 15 including the Ivy League plus MIT, Stanford, New York University, Georgetown University, Northwestern University and the University of Chicago.

=== Forbes' New Ivies List ===
Since 2024, Forbes has published a "New Ivies" list of non-Ivy League universities based on exclusivity and surveys of hiring managers. Carnegie Mellon University, Emory University, Georgetown University, Northwestern University, Rice University, University of Notre Dame, and Vanderbilt University have been consistently included in every edition of the list. (Note: Forbes' 2026 'New Ivies' list excluded the eight members of the Ivy League and what it terms 'Ivy Plus', which included Stanford, MIT, Duke, the University of Chicago, and Johns Hopkins University. JHU was included in the 'New Ivies' list for 2024 and 2025 but was reclassified as an "Ivy Plus' since 2026.)

== See also ==
- Colonial colleges
- Public Ivies
