= Garcelon Field =

Stadium in Lewiston, Maine

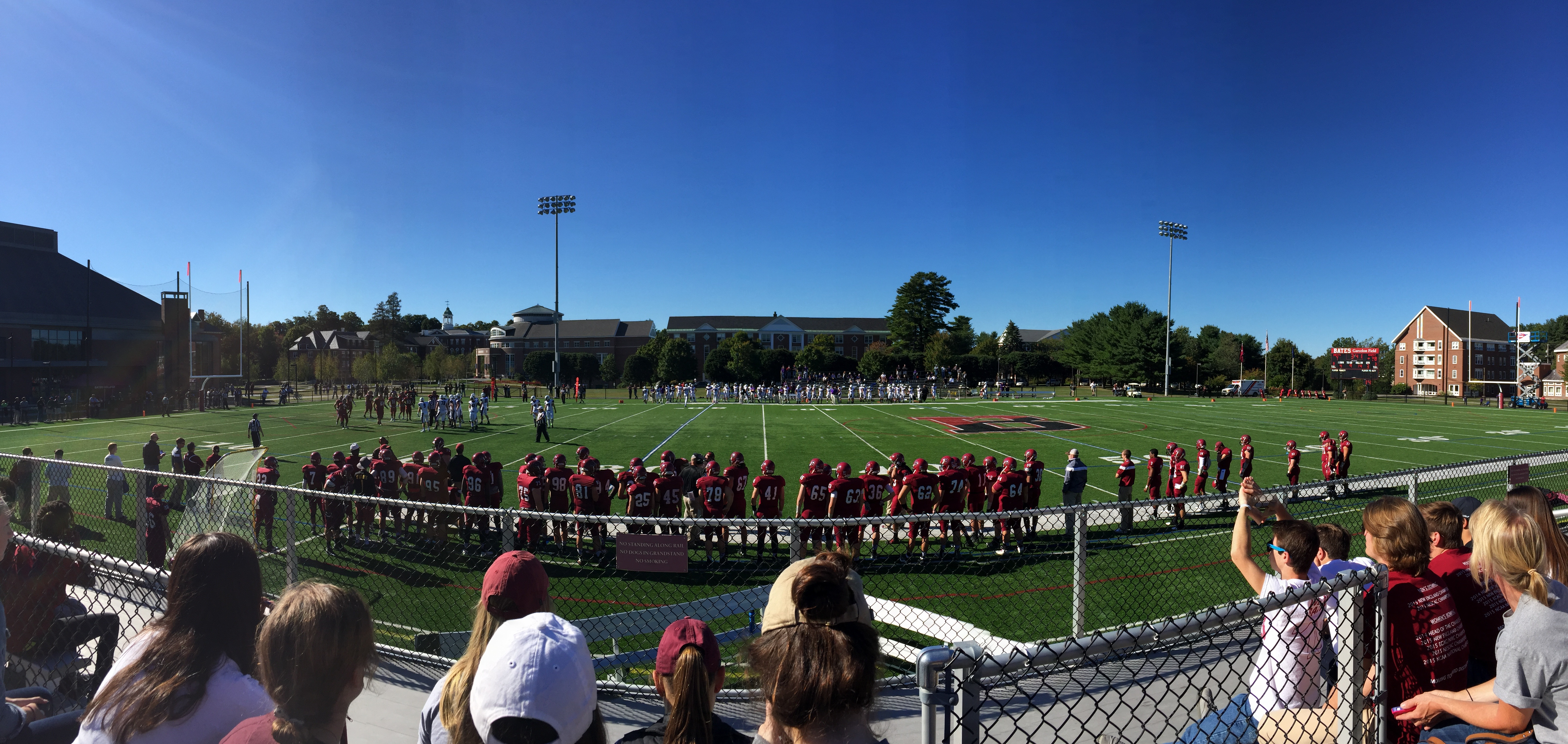
- A Bates football game against Amherst
- Interactive map of Garcelon Field
- Location: Lewiston, Maine, U.S.
- Coordinates: 44.1062°N 70.2010°W
- Operator: Bates College
- Capacity: 3,000

Construction
- Built: 1899; 127 years ago
- Expanded: 2010

Tenant
- Bates Bobcats (NCAA)

Garcelon Field is the outdoor stadium and field of Bates College, located in Lewiston, Maine. It is the home field for the Bates Bobcats football, soccer, and lacrosse teams, and is also used for various other sports.

== History ==
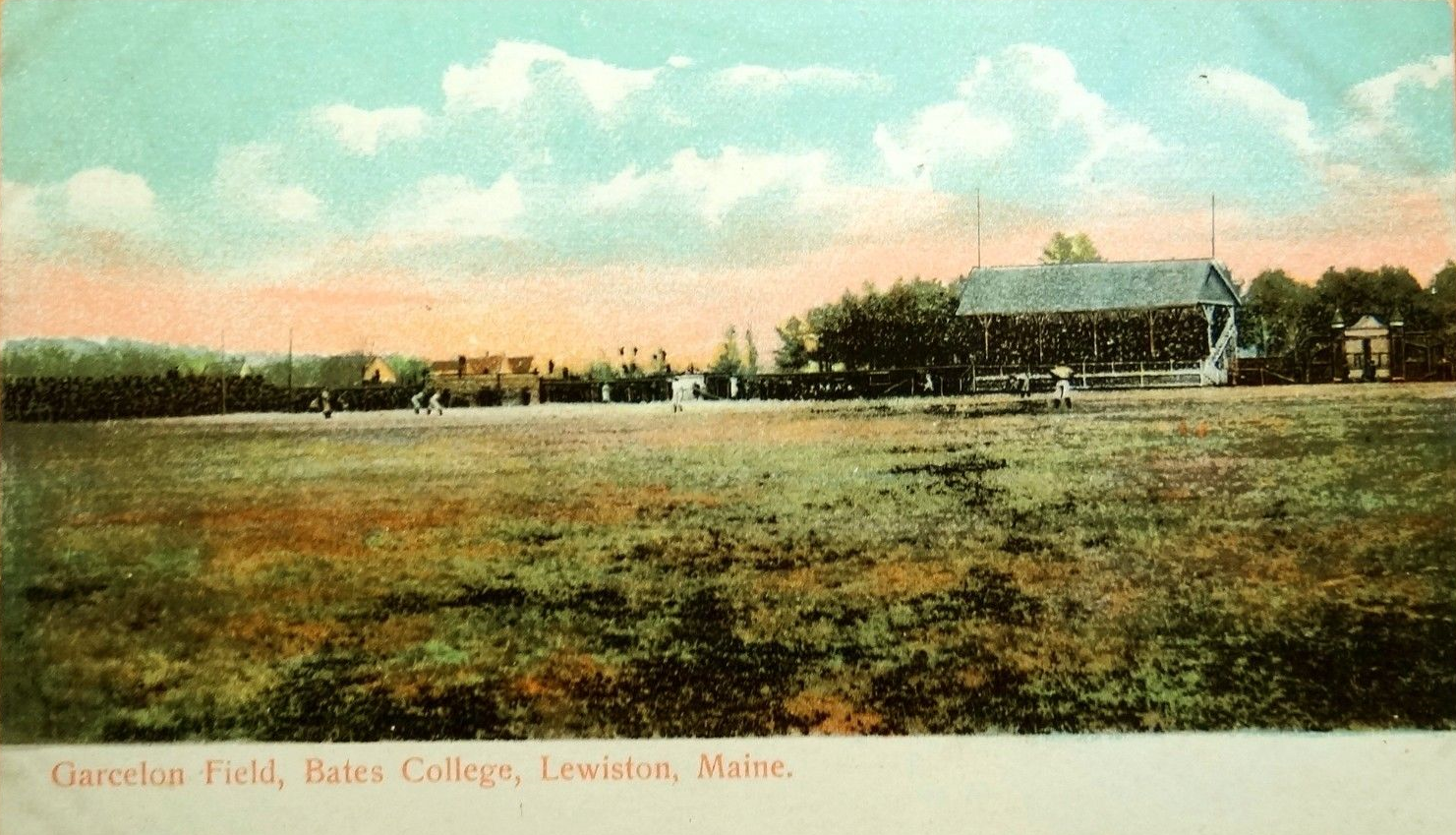
Garcelon Field in the early 20th century, with the original grandstand

The field was completed in 1899, and is one of the oldest football pitches in the United States. It was named after the 36th Governor of Maine and American Civil War surgeon general, Alonzo Garcelon. He was an early benefactor of the college.

In 1875, prior to the completion of Garcelon Field, Bates played Tufts at a field adjacent to Rand Hall on the Bates campus for the first organized intercollegiate football game played in Maine.

== Development ==
In 2010, Garcelon Field had a renovation that featured a new FieldTurf surface with an aluminum grandstand for an added 1,500 fans including stadium seats in the center section. Soon after a larger press box was created and four Musco light towers for nighttime play were incorporated.
