= Colby-Bates-Bowdoin Consortium =

Academic consortium and athletic conference

Locations of Colby, Bates, and Bowdoin

The Colby-Bates-Bowdoin Consortium (CBB) is an athletic conference and academic consortium between three private liberal arts colleges in the U.S. state of Maine. The group consists of Colby College in Waterville, Bates College in Lewiston, and Bowdoin College in Brunswick. In allusion to the Big Three of the Ivy League, they are collectively known the "Maine Big Three", a play on words with the words "Maine" and "main". The school names are ordered by their geographical organization in Maine (north to south).

The colleges contest a variety of college sports between themselves, primarily in football and rowing. On the former, they compete for a CBB Championship Trophy in three-way football games in the Fall of their respective academic years. As of the 2023–24 season, Bowdoin leads the conference in wins, with 20; Colby has 17 and Bates has won 13. There have been eight three-way-ties: 1965, 1979, 1993, 1995, 2009, 2011, 2013, and 2022. For rowing, the schools contest the CBB Chase Regatta, an annual up-and-down river tourney for the President's Cup. The all-time leader of the Chase Regatta is Bates with a total of 18 composite wins, followed by Colby's 5 wins, concluding with Bowdoin's 1 win.

== History ==
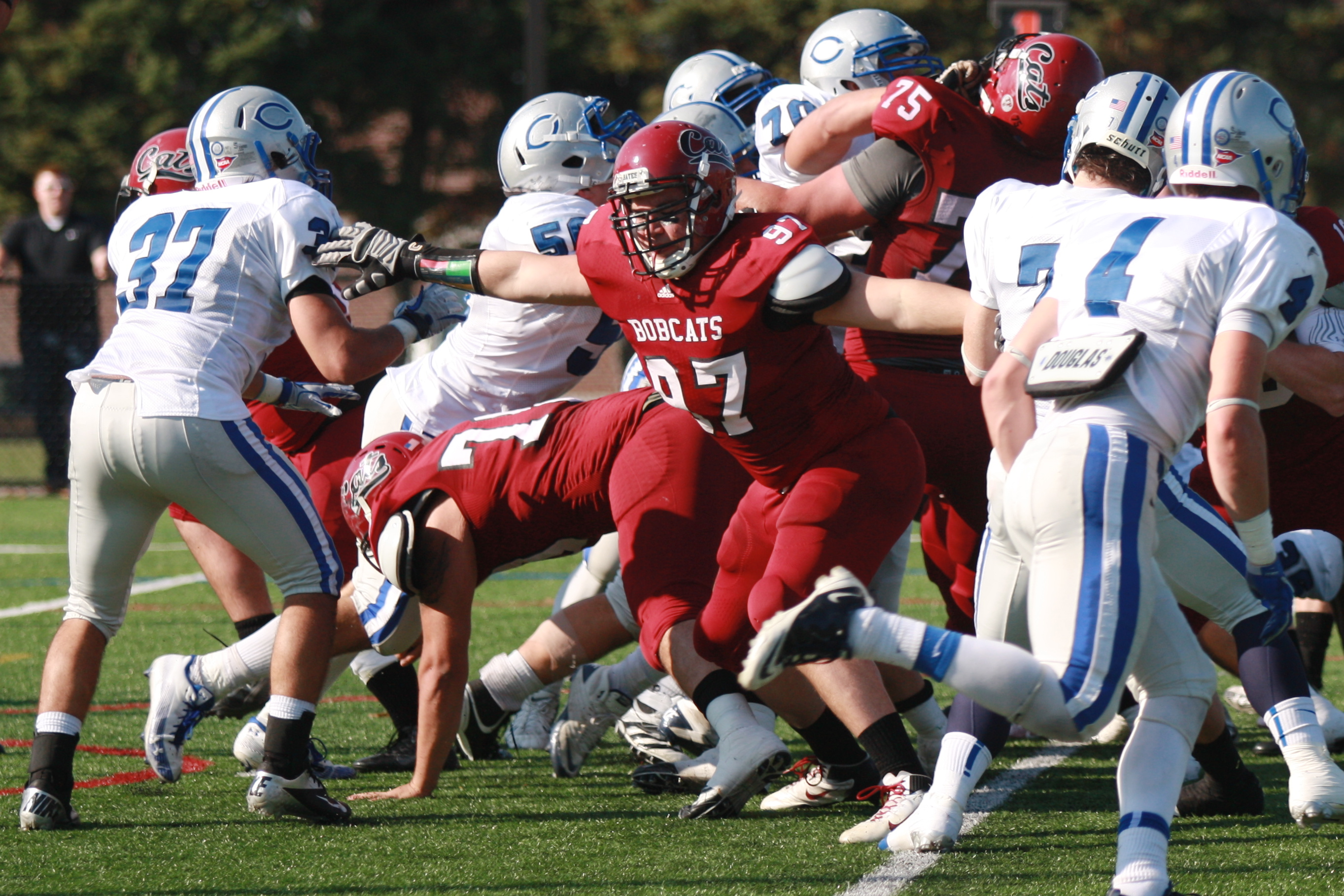
Colby playing Bates at their homecoming game, 2012

From its inception, Bates College served as an alternative to a more traditional and historically conservative Bowdoin College. There is a long tradition of rivalry and competitiveness between the two colleges, revolving around socioeconomic class, academic quality, and collegiate athletics. The two colleges have competed against each other athletically since the 1870s, and subsequently share one of the ten oldest NCAA Division III football rivalries, in the United States. The Bates-Bowdoin Game is the most attended football game every academic year at both colleges. Bowdoin developed a "football fight song" entitled, "Forward the White" in 1913. All football games between the two occurred on Bowdoin's Whittier Field, until the development of Bates' Garcelon Field.

Colby remained isolated from neighboring Bates, and the Colby-Bates-Bowdoin Consortium because of its location in Waterville as well as socioeconomic and political differences. The CBB Games was created for the 1965 college football season. Previously, Bates and Bowdoin have competed since 1870s against the University of Maine in the Maine State Series or Maine State Championship. When the University of Maine moved to a higher division in 1965, Colby joined and the rivalry took its current name. In the 1940s, Colby began competing with the two colleges and in the first game, had a three-way tie. In 1988, Bates president Thomas Hedley Reynolds began the Chase Regatta, a rowing competition, which features the President's Cup, which is contested annually. Since August 3, 1997, when Reynolds instated the President's Cup to be contested by all three for rowing. Rowing is the most active boat sport of Bates and Colby, with Bowdoin being more active in Sailing. Bowdoin is the only college in the CBB to maintain a Club Rowing team, and suspended its varsity team at its founding.

== Football ==
=== Series results ===
Season	Result	Colby–Bates Score	Bates–Bowdoin Score	Bowdoin–Colby Score
1965	3-way tie	Colby, 39–20	Bates, 10–0	Bowdoin, 28–21
1966	Bates	Bates, 28–7	Bates, 35–13	Bowdoin, 15–6
1967	Bates	Bates, 38–14	Bates, 38–24	Bowdoin, 7–0
1968	Bowdoin	Bates, 28–12	Bowdoin, 41–14	Bowdoin, 17–0
1969	Bowdoin	Colby, 14–13	Bowdoin, 13–10	Bowdoin, 38–14
1970	Bowdoin	Bates, 14–7	Bowdoin, 21–3	Bowdoin, 31–17
1971	Bowdoin	Colby, 17–8	Bowdoin, 42–15	Bowdoin, 30–27
1972	Colby	Colby, 35–21	Bowdoin, 37–10	Colby, 28–22
1973	Bowdoin	Colby, 14–0	Bowdoin, 20–12	Bowdoin, 28–20
1974	Bates	Bates, 16–14	Bates, 18–7	Bowdoin, 27–6
1975	Bowdoin	Colby, 21–12	Bowdoin, 19–6	Bowdoin, 41–13
1976	Bowdoin	Bates, 38–16	Bowdoin, 20–14	Bowdoin, 37–19
1977	Bowdoin	Bates, 25–14	Bowdoin, 21–17	Bowdoin, 15–14
1978	Bates	Bates, 27–20	Bates, 24–14	Bowdoin, 27–10
1979	3-way tie	Bates, 20–7	Bowdoin, 14–0	Colby, 21–20
1980	Bowdoin	Bates, 14–13	Bowdoin, 13–0	Bowdoin, 8–0
1981	Bates	Bates, 10–6	Bates, 23–13	Colby, 17–13
1982	Bowdoin	Colby, 28–21	Bowdoin, 33–14	Bowdoin, 18–0
1983	Colby	Colby, 20–13	Bates, 33–15	Colby, 15–14
1984	Bowdoin	Bates, 31–21	Bowdoin, 28–23	Bowdoin, 20–14
1985	Bowdoin	Bates, 51–0	Bowdoin, 24–21	Bowdoin, 24–0
1986	Bates	Bates, 21–6	Bates, 36–0	Bowdoin, 21–14
1987	Bowdoin	Bates, 46–28	Bowdoin, 20–19	Bowdoin, 14–10
1988	Colby	Colby, 19–3	Bowdoin, 10–6	Colby, 24–0
1989	Colby	Colby, 30–0	Bates, 10–0	Colby, 38–20
1990	Colby	Colby, 9–3	Bates, 19–14	Colby, 23–20
1991	Colby	Colby, 41–7	Bowdoin, 34–13	Colby, 28–13
1992	Colby	Colby, 50–0	Bowdoin, 35–14	Colby, 26–18
1993	2-way tie: Colby and Bowdoin	Colby, 53–14	Bowdoin, 34–6	Tie, 21–21
1994	Colby	Colby, 28–6	Bates, 33–14	Colby, 34–13
1995	3-way tie	Colby, 26–6	Bates, 33–29	Bowdoin, 24–3
1996	Colby	Colby, 28–21	Bowdoin, 35–16	Colby, 39–15
1997	Bowdoin	Bates, 22–21	Bowdoin, 28–19	Bowdoin, 27–19
1998	Bowdoin	Bates, 13–7	Bowdoin, 49–14	Bowdoin, 10–7
1999	Bates	Bates, 20–17 (OT)	Bates, 38–7	Colby, 20–0
2000	Colby	Colby, 14–0	Bates, 44–13	Colby, 34–7
2001	Colby	Colby, 42–0	Bates, 38–35 (OT)	Colby, 41–13
2002	Bates	Bates, 19–14	Bates, 48–28	Colby, 32–27
2003	Colby	Colby, 27–14	Bates, 20–17	Colby, 7–6
2004	Colby	Colby, 17–16	Bowdoin, 21–0	Colby, 23–0
2005	Colby	Colby, 24–17	Bowdoin, 21–14	Colby, 28–3
2006	Bowdoin	Colby, 10–7 (4OT)	Bowdoin, 23–14	Bowdoin, 13–10
2007	Bowdoin	Colby, 20–13	Bowdoin, 31–7	Bowdoin, 20–17
2008	Bowdoin	Bates, 31–21	Bowdoin, 55–14	Bowdoin, 20–6
2009	3-way tie	Colby, 34–27	Bates, 28–24	Bowdoin, 32–27
2010	Bowdoin	Colby, 10–6	Bowdoin, 21–20	Bowdoin, 26–21
2011	3-way tie	Colby, 37–13	Bates, 24–2	Bowdoin, 20–10
2012	Bates	Bates, 31–6	Bates, 14–6	Colby, 17–0
2013	3-way tie	Colby, 21–3	Bates, 17–10	Bowdoin, 32–22
2014	Bates	Bates, 34–28 (OT)	Bates, 10–7	Colby, 14–7
2015	Bates	Bates, 10–9	Bates, 31–0	Bowdoin, 35–13
2016	Bates	Bates, 21–19	Bates, 24–7	Colby, 32–16
2017	Bates	Bates, 27–24	Bates, 24–17	Colby, 31–20
2018	Colby	Colby, 21–6	Bowdoin, 31–14	Colby, 30–14
2019	Colby	Colby, 23–20	Bates, 30–5	Colby, 47–34
2021	Colby	Colby, 10–2	Bates, 25–24	Colby, 21–10
2022	3-way tie	Colby, 38–17	Bates, 21–14	Bowdoin, 21–14
2023	Bowdoin	Colby, 30–24	Bowdoin, 35–20	Bowdoin, 35–14
2024	Colby	Colby, 28–26	Bowdoin, 35–24	Colby, 34–10
2025	Colby	Colby, 13–6	Bowdoin, 17–9	Colby, 16–6
2026	Colby	Colby, 21–19	Bates, 10–7	Colby, 19–13
Season	Winner	Colby – Bates score	Bates – Bowdoin score	Bowdoin – Colby score

Note: Source of wins and losses: games between 1966 and 1978, games between 1979 and 1998, and for all other games not specified in aforementioned years: The highest scoring game was the 1987 Colby-Bates with a total of 74 points. The lowest scoring game was the 1967 Bowdoin-Colby game with a total of 7 points. The biggest shutout was Bates' 51–0 game against Colby in 1985. The longest consecutive streak of games won is Colby with 5 championships in a row (1988–1992). There have been 7 three-way-ties, 1 two-way tie, and 4 uses of overtime, (the 2006 Colby-Bates game required overtime to be issued four times for a winner to be determined).

=== Statistics ===
Statistic	Colby	Bates	Bowdoin
Games played	114		
Series Wins	17	13	20
Highest series streak	5	4	4
Current series streak	L1	L1	W1
Total points scored in the series	2294	2105	2285
Most points scored in a winning game	53	51	55
Most points scored in a losing game	28	27	35
Fewest points scored in a winning game	10	10	7
Most points scored in a shutout win	50	51	24
Overtime wins	1	3	0
Largest margin of victory	50	51	41
Smallest margin of victory	1	1	1

== Rowing ==
=== Series results ===
No.	Date	Site	Overall winner	President's Cup	Composite time	Bates total	Bowdoin total	Colby total	Cite
1	1997	Kennebec River	Bowdoin	Colby	—	—	1	—	
2	1998	Messalonskee Stream	Colby	Colby	—	—	—	1	
3	1999	Messalonskee Stream	Colby	Colby	—	—	—	2	
4	2000	Kennebec River	Bates	Bates	—	1	—	—	
5	2001	Messalonskee River	Colby	Colby	—	—	—	3	
6	2002	Kennebec River	Colby	Colby	—	—	—	4	
7	2003	Messalonskee River	Bates	Colby	—	2	—	—	
8	2004	Messalonskee River	Bates	Colby	—	3	—	—	
9	2005	Kennebec River	Colby	Colby	—	—	—	5	
10	2006	Kennebec River	Bates	Bates	—	4	—	—	
11	2007	Messalonskee Stream	Bates	Colby	—	5	—	—	
12	2008	Messalonskee Stream	Bates	Bates	—	6	—	—	
13	2009	Kennebec River	Bates	Bates	—	7	—	—	
14	2010	Messalonskee Stream	Bates	Bowdoin	MV8 (10:11.1) WV8 (11:43.0)	8	—	—	
15	2011	Androscoggin River	Bates	Bates	MV8 (6:41.1) WV8 (7:26.3)	9	—	—	
16	2012	Messalonskee Stream	Bates	Cancelled	MV8 (8:57.7) WV8 (9:41.9)	10	—	—	
17	2013	Messalonskee Stream	Bates	Bates	MV8 (6:45.6) WV8 (7:27.3)	11	—	—	
18	2014	Androscoggin River	Bates	Bates	MV8 (6:18.9) WV8 (7:02.3)	12	—	—	
19	2015	Kennebec River	Bates	Bates	MV8 (5:30.1) WV8 (5:53.0)	13	—	—	
20	2016	Kennebec River	Bates	Bates	MV8 (5:53.0) WV8 (6:39.0)	14	—	—	
21	2017	Androscoggin River	Bates	Bates	MV8 (7:17.2) WV8 (8:16.2)	15	—	—	
22	2018	Androscoggin River	Bates	Bates	MV8 (6:37.2) WV8 (7:35.7)	16	—	—	
23	2019	Androscoggin River	Bates	Bates	MV8 (6:38.6) WV8 (7:32.1)	17	—	—	
24	2022	Androscoggin River	Bates	Bates	MV8 (6:28.1) WV8 (7:16.0)	18	—	—	
25	2023	Androscoggin River	Bates	Bates	MV8 (6:02.5) WV8 (6:57.2)	19	—	—	
26	2024	Androscoggin River	Bates	Bates	MV8 (5:41.5) WV8 (6:39.9)	20	—	—	
27	2025	Androscoggin River	Bates	Bates	MV8 (5:59.4) WV8 (7:01.0)	21	—	—	

Note: The President's Cup is given to the team that has won the most overall heats and races, while the overall winner is determined by who won the most varsity and heavyweight competitions in the regatta.

The all-time leader of the Chase Regatta is Bates with a total of 18 composite wins, followed by Colby's 5 wins, concluding with Bowdoin's 1 win. The regatta has been held on various waters, and is hosted by all three of the colleges; the most frequent waters occupied are: the Androscoggin River (Bates and Bowdoin), the Kennebec River (Colby), and Messalonskee River (Colby).

=== Records ===
- Number of wins: (Bates) — 18 composite wins
- Most consecutive victories: (Bates, 2006 - 2022 — overall winner), (Bates, 2011-2022)
- Smallest winning margin: (Bowdoin, 1997) — .9-second margin over Colby
- Largest winning margin: (Bates, 2013) — 59-second margin ahead of runner-up Colby.

=== Trophies ===
The President's Cup — instated to be contested by all three of the schools in rowing.

== In fiction ==
In 1999, all three colleges were prominently featured in The Sopranos. In the episode entitled, "College", Tony Soprano takes his daughter, Meadow on a trip to Maine to tour the Colby-Bates-Bowdoin Consortium.

== See also ==
- List of college athletic programs in Maine
