= Public Ivy =

United States public universities comparable to Ivy League schools

"Public Ivy" is an informal term that refers to public universities in the United States that are perceived to provide a collegiate experience on the level of Ivy League universities. There is no trademark for the term, and the list of schools associated with the classification has changed over time.

The term was coined in 1985 by Yale University admissions officer Richard Moll, who published Public Ivies: A Guide to America's Best Public Undergraduate Colleges and Universities. That initial list included eight universities and nine runners-up. In 2001, college guide authors Howard Greene and Matthew Greene, released their own book, The Public Ivies: The Great State Colleges and Universities, which included 30 schools. The term has continued to evolve in the 21st century; since 2024, Forbes has published an annual list of "New Ivies" that included ten public institutions considered by employers to be among the most prestigious and desirable in the United States.

Debates about Public Ivies have centered on whether state budgetary cuts are undermining their future; whether raising tuition at Public Ivies has "gentrified" the schools; whether states should be subsidizing higher education in the first place; whether graduates of Public Ivies are able to pay back student loans as quickly as their Ivy League counterparts; and whether out-of-state tuition is too high.

== History ==
The term first appeared in the Public Ivies: A Guide to America's Best Public Undergraduate Colleges and Universities, published in 1985. The author, Richard Moll, graduated with a master's degree from Yale University in 1959 and served as an admissions officer as well as a director of admissions at several universities in the United States. He traveled the nation examining higher education institutions, and selected eight that were comparable to the Ivy League.

Moll's original ranking methodology included factors such as academic rigor, quality of faculty, and cost of tuition, as well as assessments of campus facilities, available resources, age, and major cultural traditions celebrated at each institution.

=== Original list published in 1985 ===
A map of the original "Public Ivies" (in red) and the worthy runners-up (in blue) from 1985.
- College of William & Mary (Williamsburg, Virginia)
- Miami University (Oxford, Ohio)
- University of California (applies to the campuses as of 1985: Berkeley, Los Angeles, San Diego, Irvine, Davis, Santa Barbara, Santa Cruz, and Riverside)
- University of Michigan (Ann Arbor)
- University of North Carolina at Chapel Hill
- University of Texas at Austin
- University of Vermont (Burlington)
- University of Virginia (Charlottesville)

==== Runners-up ====
As part of the initial 1985 publication, Moll also selected nine "worthy runner-up" universities:

- University of Colorado Boulder
- Georgia Institute of Technology (Atlanta)
- University of Illinois Urbana–Champaign
- New College of Florida (formerly New College of the University of South Florida, it became an independent part of Florida's State University System in 2001)
- Pennsylvania State University (University Park)
- University of Pittsburgh
- State University of New York at Binghamton (also known as Binghamton University)
- University of Washington (Seattle)
- University of Wisconsin–Madison

== Notable updates ==
=== Greenes' Guides list (2001) ===
The list of "public Ivy" institutions has gone through several revisions over the years, much like other university rankings and conferences. A notable update was published in 2001, when Howard and Matthew Greene included the following 30 colleges and universities in The Public Ivies: America's Flagship Public Universities.

A map of colleges listed as public ivies in the 2001 version of The Public Ivies: America's Flagship Public Universities by Howard and Matthew Greene.

==== Northeastern ====
- Pennsylvania State University (University Park)
- Rutgers University (New Brunswick, New Jersey)
- State University of New York at Binghamton
- University of Connecticut (Storrs)

==== Mid-Atlantic ====
- College of William & Mary (Williamsburg, Virginia)
- University of Delaware (Newark)
- University of Maryland, College Park
- University of Virginia (Charlottesville)

==== Western ====
- University of Arizona (Tucson)
- University of California, Berkeley
- University of California, Davis
- University of California, Irvine
- University of California, Los Angeles
- University of California, San Diego
- University of California, Santa Barbara
- University of Colorado Boulder
- University of Washington (Seattle)

==== Great Lakes and Midwest ====
- Indiana University Bloomington
- Miami University (Oxford, Ohio)
- Michigan State University (East Lansing)
- Ohio State University (Columbus)
- University of Illinois Urbana-Champaign
- University of Iowa (Iowa City)
- University of Michigan (Ann Arbor)
- University of Minnesota, Twin Cities
- University of Wisconsin–Madison

==== Southern ====
- University of Florida (Gainesville)
- University of Georgia (Athens)
- University of North Carolina at Chapel Hill
- University of Texas at Austin

== List of Public Ivies ==
Institution	Location	Founded	Enrollment (fall 2023)	Endowment (FY23)	Ranking		Admit rate	Athletics		Colors
Institution	Location	Founded	Enrollment (fall 2023)	Endowment (FY23)	USNWR Public	USNWR National	Admit rate	Affiliation	Nickname	Colors
University of Arizona	Tucson, Arizona	1885	53,001	$1.29 billion	52	109	86%	NCAA Div I Big 12	Wildcats	
Binghamton University	Vestal, New York	1946	18,456	$182.7 million	34 (tie)	73 (tie)	38%	NCAA Div I America East	Bearcats	
University of California, Berkeley	Berkeley, California	1868	45,699	$2.91 billion	2	17	12%	NCAA Div I ACC	Golden Bears	
University of California, Davis	Davis, California	1905	39,707	$678.0 million	9 (tie)	33 (tie)	42%	NCAA Div I Big West	Aggies	
University of California, Irvine	Irvine, California	1965	36,582	$795.9 million	9 (tie)	33 (tie)	26%	NCAA Div I Big West	Anteaters	
University of California, Los Angeles	Los Angeles, California	1919	46,678	$3.87 billion	1	15	9%	NCAA Div I Big Ten	Bruins	
University of California, San Diego	La Jolla, California	1960	42,376	$1.36 billion	6	29	25%	NCAA Div I Big West	Tritons	
University of California, Santa Barbara	Santa Barbara, California	1891	26,068	$578.8 million	13 (tie)	39 (tie)	28%	NCAA Div I Big West	Gauchos	
University of Colorado Boulder	Boulder, Colorado	1876	41,432	$2.10 billion (system-wide)	46 (tie)	98 (tie)	83%	NCAA Div I Big 12	Buffaloes	
University of Connecticut	Storrs, Connecticut	1881	27,364	$577.3 million	32	70	54%	NCAA Div I Big East	Huskies	
University of Delaware	Newark, Delaware	1743	24,221	$1.82 billion	44	86	65%	NCAA Div I CAA	Fightin' Blue Hens	
University of Florida	Gainesville, Florida	1853	54,814	$2.34 billion	7 (tie)	30 (tie)	24%	NCAA Div I SEC	Gators	
University of Georgia	Athens, Georgia	1785	41,615	$1.81 billion	18 (tie)	46 (tie)	37%	NCAA Div I SEC	Bulldogs	
University of Illinois Urbana-Champaign	Urbana-Champaign, Illinois	1867	56,563	$3.38 billion (system-wide)	9 (tie)	33 (tie)	44%	NCAA Div I Big Ten	Fighting Illini	
Indiana University Bloomington	Bloomington, Indiana	1820	47,527	$3.56 billion (system-wide)	34 (tie)	73 (tie)	80%	NCAA Div I Big Ten	Hoosiers	
University of Iowa	Iowa City, Iowa	1847	30,042	$3.26 billion	46 (tie)	98 (tie)	85%	NCAA Div I Big Ten	Hawkeyes	
University of Maryland	College Park, Maryland	1856	40,813	$2.10 billion (system-wide)	17	44	45%	NCAA Div I Big Ten	Terrapins	
Miami University	Oxford, Ohio	1809	18,618	$741.2 million	69	136	82%	NCAA Div I MAC	RedHawks	
University of Michigan	Ann Arbor, Michigan	1817	52,065	$17.88 billion	3	21	18%	NCAA Div I Big Ten	Wolverines	
Michigan State University	East Lansing, Michigan	1855	51,316	$4.50 billion	30 (tie)	63 (tie)	84%	NCAA Div I Big Ten	Spartans	
University of Minnesota	Minneapolis–St Paul, Minnesota	1851	54,890	$5.50 billion (system-wide)	23 (tie)	54 (tie)	77%	NCAA Div I Big Ten	Golden Gophers	
University of North Carolina at Chapel Hill	Chapel Hill, North Carolina	1789	32,234	$5.20 billion	5	27	19%	NCAA Div I ACC	Tar Heels	
Ohio State University	Columbus, Ohio	1870	60,046	$7.38 billion	15 (tie)	41 (tie)	51%	NCAA Div I Big Ten	Buckeyes	
Pennsylvania State University	University Park, Pennsylvania	1855	50,399	$4.44 billion	30 (tie)	63 (tie)	54%	NCAA Div I Big Ten	Nittany Lions	
Rutgers University	New Brunswick, New Jersey	1766	50,617	$1.99 billion (system-wide)	15 (tie)	41 (tie)	65%	NCAA Div I Big Ten	Scarlet Knights	
University of Texas at Austin	Austin, Texas	1883	53,082	$44.97 billion (system-wide)	7 (tie)	30 (tie)	29%	NCAA Div I SEC	Longhorns	
University of Virginia	Charlottesville, Virginia	1819	25,924	$9.80 billion	4	24	17%	NCAA Div I ACC	Cavaliers	
University of Washington	Seattle, Washington	1861	55,620	$4.94 billion	18 (tie)	46 (tie)	43%	NCAA Div I Big Ten	Huskies	
College of William & Mary	Williamsburg, Virginia	1693	9,762	$1.36 billion	23 (tie)	54 (tie)	33%	NCAA Div I CAA	Tribe	
University of Wisconsin–Madison	Madison, Wisconsin	1848	49,605	$3.84 billion	13 (tie)	39 (tie)	43.3%	NCAA Div I Big Ten	Badgers	

== Forbes list of "New Ivies" ==
Since 2024, Forbes published a list titled "The New Ivies," naming 10 public and 10 private U.S. institutions considered by surveyed employers to produce graduates who are especially in demand in the workforce. The ranking was based on a survey of hundreds of employers, including C-suite executives and hiring managers, as well as admissions metrics such as test scores and selectivity. In 2025, Forbes also reported that 37% of surveyed employers said they were less likely to hire an Ivy League graduate than they had been five years earlier.

=== Public institutions on the list ===
The following public universities have included among the "New Ivies" lists published by Forbes:

- Binghamton University (2024)
- University of Florida (2024, 2026)
- Georgia Institute of Technology (2024, 2025, 2026)
- University of Illinois Urbana-Champaign (2024, 2025)
- University of Maryland, College Park (2024)
- University of Michigan, Ann Arbor (2024, 2025, 2026)
- University of North Carolina at Chapel Hill (2024, 2025, 2026)
- University of Pittsburgh (2025)
- Purdue University (2025, 2026)
- University of Texas at Austin (2024, 2025, 2026)
- United States Air Force Academy (2026)
- United States Military Academy (2025)
- University of Virginia (2024, 2025, 2026)
- College of William & Mary (2025, 2026)
- University of Wisconsin–Madison (2024, 2026)

=== Relation to the Public Ivy concept ===
Several of the institutions on the Forbes list overlap with historical lists of Public Ivies. However, the Forbes methodology emphasized current employer demand, admissions metrics, and student selectivity rather than tradition or historical comparisons to the Ivy League. Notably, institutions that do not report standardized test scores—such as campuses of the University of California—were excluded from consideration despite often being cited as top public universities.

=== Criticism and observations ===
Commentators have noted that the list’s reliance on standardized test reporting may disadvantage universities that have adopted test-optional or test-free admissions policies. Others view the ranking as evidence of shifting priorities in higher education, with employers placing greater emphasis on workforce readiness and skills rather than institutional prestige alone.

== See also ==
- Colonial colleges
- Flagship universities
- IvyPlus
