= Southern Ivy =

Informal term referring to universities in the Southern United States

Southern Ivy is a term used to describe a university in the Southern United States that is comparable to a university in the Ivy League, usually from the perspective of having a similar level of academic quality or social prestige. Unlike the Ivy League, which is an established group of eight universities in the Northeastern United States, there is not a fixed standard for what constitutes a Southern Ivy, and different sources list different universities depending on their criteria. The term "Southern Ivy League" is also used to refer to a proposed athletic conference that would have included several Southern Ivies.

== List of universities ==
The following universities have appeared in lists of Southern Ivies.

College	State	Governance	References
Duke University	North Carolina	Private	
Emory University	Georgia	Private	
Rice University	Texas	Private	
Southern Methodist University	Texas	Private	
Tulane University	Louisiana	Private	
Vanderbilt University	Tennessee	Private	
University of Virginia	Virginia	Public	
Wake Forest University	North Carolina	Private	
College of William & Mary	Virginia	Public	

== Proposed athletic conference ==
Universities considered at various times during the 1950s and 1960s for a "Southern Ivy League" athletic conference

Following World War II, many small private universities, such as Vanderbilt, began to struggle to compete against larger public universities in American football. In the Southeastern Conference (SEC), the Vanderbilt Commodores, which had fielded competitive teams in the early 20th century, struggled against other teams and by the 1940s was running a deficit in its athletics department. In the late 1940s, Vanderbilt Chancellor Harvie Branscomb hoped to reposition the university's football team as a more low-budget program by creating rivalries with Ivy League universities, and to this end he scheduled a 1948 game against the Yale Bulldogs football team. However, when Vanderbilt beat the Bulldogs by a score of 35–0, Yale declined to play any further games against the Commodores.

Around 1951, Branscomb attempted to organize a new athletic conference that would have been a Southern equivalent of the Ivy League with universities such as Duke, Rice, Tulane, Virginia, and Washington University in St. Louis joining Vanderbilt, though the effort failed, prompting Branscomb to remark that his university was "located in a spot where ivy does not seem to flourish." Later that year, Branscomb proposed a series of changes to the SEC's regulations that would have helped Vanderbilt's teams, but these were rejected by the administrators of the other universities in the conference. In the late 1950s, Branscomb secretly held a meeting with the presidents of five other Southern universities (Duke, Georgia Tech, Rice, Southern Methodist, and Tulane) to discuss forming a new conference, referred to as either the "Southern Ivy League" or the "Magnolia Conference." However, the proposed conference never came to fruition. In the cases of Duke and Georgia Tech, the two universities did not want to jeopardize their in-state rivalries against the University of North Carolina and the University of Georgia, respectively, while Rice and Southern Methodist did not want to give up their share of income from the Cotton Bowl Classic. While discussions of a Southern Ivy League persisted, often including Duke, Rice, Southern Methodist, Tulane, and Vanderbilt, the conference never materialized, and by the early 1960s, the plan had been retired.

== Sources ==
- Ainsworth, James, ed. (2013). Sociology of Education: An A-to-Z Guide. Vol. 1. Thousand Oaks, California: SAGE Publications. p. 873. ISBN 978-1-4522-7614-4. OCLC 847526825.
- Carey, Bill (2003). "Harvie Versus the Football Team". Chancellors, Commodores, and Coeds: A History of Vanderbilt University (1st ed.). Nashville, Tennessee: Clearbook Press. pp. 219–223. ISBN 978-0-9725680-0-5. LCCN 2002096716. OCLC 51755981.
- Carlton, Genevieve (August 16, 2024). Miller, Danika (ed.). "The Public Ivies, Little Ivies, and Other Ivy League Equivalents". BestColleges. Red Ventures. Archived from the original on December 17, 2024.
- Delery, Clayton (2017). Out for Queer Blood: The Murder of Fernando Rios and the Failure of New Orleans Justice. Foreword by Robert L. Camina. Jefferson, North Carolilna: Exposit Books. ISBN 978-1-4766-6884-0. OCLC 1007499105.
- Mohr, Clarence L. (1997). "World War II and the Transformation of Southern Higher Education". In McMillen, Neil R. (ed.). Remaking Dixie: The Impact of World War II on the American South. Jackson, Mississippi: University Press of Mississippi. pp. 33–55. ISBN 978-0-585-03304-4. OCLC 42330019.
- Morgan, Genevieve (2014). Undecided: Navigating Life and Learning After High School. San Francisco: Zest Books. ISBN 978-1-936976-32-4. OCLC 856567356.
- Walsh, Christopher J. (2006). Where Football is King: A History of the SEC (First Taylor Trade Publishing ed.). Lanham, Maryland: Taylor Trade Publishing. ISBN 978-1-58979-355-2. OCLC 64335804.
- Papillion, Jude (September 23, 2022). "Why Tulane left the SEC". Tulane Hullabaloo. Archived from the original on December 11, 2023.
- Saul, Derek (April 14, 2022) [August 15, 2019]. "25 Top Colleges And Universities In The South 2019, Ranked By Academics And Outcomes". Forbes. ISSN 0015-6914. OCLC 6465733. Archived from the original on April 21, 2024.
- "What Are the Southern Ivies? Is this the right place for you?". Crimson Education.
