= Eastern Intercollegiate Ski Association =

The Eastern Intercollegiate Ski Association (EISA) is an NCAA skiing-only conference. As the NCAA does not have divisions in skiing, it is composed of NCAA Division I, Division II, and Division III schools.

== Current members ==
- Bates College
- Boston College (Alpine only)
- Bowdoin College (Nordic only)
- Colby College
- Colby-Sawyer College (Alpine only)
- Dartmouth College
- Harvard University
- Middlebury College
- Plymouth State University (Alpine only)
- St. Lawrence University
- Saint Michael's College
- University of New Hampshire
- University of Vermont
- Williams College
