= 1942 Amherst Lord Jeffs football team =

American college football season

1942 Amherst Lord Jeffs football

Little Three champion
- Conference: Little Three Conference
- Record: 7–0 (2–0 Little Three)
- Head coach: Lloyd Jordan (11th season)
- Home stadium: Pratt Field

The 1942 Amherst Lord Jeffs football team was an American football team that represented Amherst College as a member of the Little Three Conference during the 1942 college football season. In their 11th year under head coach Lloyd Jordan, the Lord Jeffs compiled a 7–0 record, won the Little Three championship, shut out four of seven opponents, and outscored all opponents by a total of 175 to 31.

The 1942 season was the first perfect season in the history of Amherst's football program. Others followed in 1964, 1984, 2009, 2011, 2014, and 2015.

The team played its home games at Pratt Field in Amherst, Massachusetts.

== Schedule ==
| Date | Opponent | Site | Result | Attendance | Source |
|---|---|---|---|---|---|
| October 3 | Springfield* | Pratt Field; Amherst, MA | W 27–19 | | |
| October 10 | at Bowdoin* | Brunswick, ME | W 25–0 | | |
| October 17 | Rochester* | Pratt Field; Amherst, MA | W 6–0 | | |
| October 24 | at Wesleyan | Andrus Field; Middletown, CT | W 27–0 | 5,000 | |
| October 31 | Massachusetts State* | Pratt Field; Amherst, MA | W 43–0 | | |
| November 7 | at Trinity (CT)* | Trinity Field; Hartford, CT | W 35–6 | | |
| November 14 | Williams | Pratt Field; Amherst, MA (The Biggest Little Game in America) | W 12–6 | 10,000 | |
*Non-conference game
