= 1964 Amherst Lord Jeffs football team =

American college football season

1964 Amherst Lord Jeffs football

Little Three champion
- Conference: Little Three Conference
- Record: 8–0 (2–0 Little Three)
- Head coach: Jim Ostendarp (6th season)
- Home stadium: Pratt Field

The 1964 Amherst Lord Jeffs football team was an American football team that represented Amherst College as a member of the Little Three Conference during the 1964 college football season. In their sixth year under head coach Jim Ostendarp, the Lord Jeffs compiled an 8–0 record, won the Little Three championship, and outscored opponents by a total of 180 to 73.

The 1964 season was the second perfect season in the history of Amherst's football program. The first was 1942, and others followed in 1984, 2009, 2011, 2014, and 2015.

The team played its home games at Pratt Field in Amherst, Massachusetts.

== Schedule ==
Date	Opponent	Site	Result	Attendance	Source
September 26	Springfield	Pratt Field; Amherst, MA	W 28–12	3,000–4,000	
October 3	at American International	Springfield, MA	W 14–13	3,000	
October 10	at Bowdoin	Brunswick, ME	W 19–18	3,500–4,200	
October 17	Coast Guard	Pratt Field; Amherst, MA	W 34–7	4,325	
October 24	at Wesleyan	Middletown, CT	W 24–8	4,000	
October 31	Tufts	Pratt Field; Amherst, MA	W 14–8	3,300	
November 7	at Trinity (CT)	Trinity Field; Hartford, CT	W 27–0	4,500	
November 14	Williams	Pratt Field; Amherst, MA (The Biggest Little Game in America)	W 20–7	12,000–13,000	
