= List of Hampden–Sydney Tigers football seasons =

The first football team representing Hampden–Sydney in 1892

The Hampden–Sydney Tigers college football team compete in the National Collegiate Athletic Association's (NCAA) Division III, representing Hampden–Sydney College in the Old Dominion Athletic Conference. Hampden–Sydney has played their home games at Everett Stadium in Hampden–Sydney, Virginia since 2007, replacing the 40-year-old Hundley Stadium. Hampden–Sydney's playing surface, originally named Venable Field, was built on a former frog pond dredged by students in 1896. In 1915, according to tradition, the field was nicknamed "Death Valley" by a defeated Richmond College player because Hampden–Sydney so frequently trounced opposing teams at home.

The Tigers have had seven undefeated regular seasons, is tied with Randolph–Macon for second in the ODAC with 9 total conference championships behind only Emory & Henry (11), and has an overall record of 545–452–38 in 122 seasons of football. During the undefeated 1900 football season, the Tigers were not once scored upon, posting shutouts in every single game that they played. The College's largest margin of victory was 110–0 over Virginia Medical College in 1913; largest margin of victory over a conference foe was 70–0 over Richmond in 1901; and largest margin of defeat was 0–136 to VMI in 1920.

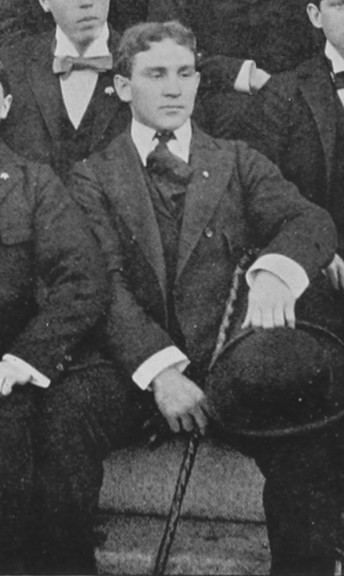
Billy Bull, 1896.

Football was introduced to the college by William Ford "Billy" Bull in 1892 after he matriculated as a freshman. Bull was also the captain of the squad for the team's first match up against Randolph–Macon College in 1893, a bitter rivalry known as The Game – the oldest small-school rivalry in the South – which has been contested 119 times. Bull led the Tigers to a record of one win and two losses over his three seasons as head coach, earning the College's first victory in 1894 with a 28–0 win over William & Mary.

The Tigers' first winning season came in 1896 under the tutelage George H. Denny, an alumnus of H–SC. Denny would later go on to be the president of the University of Alabama and the original namesake of Bryant–Denny Stadium. The only years that H–SC did not field a football team were in 1904 and 1943 due to a large percentage of the student body being drafted into the war.

Coach Fulton in Death Valley, 1972.

Hampden–Sydney was an independent from 1892 through 1899. In 1900, the school joined together with William & Mary, Richmond, and Randolph–Macon to form the Eastern Division of the Intercollegiate Association until 1921. In 1946, the Tigers joined the Mason–Dixon Conference and remained a member until the conference disbanded in 1975. In 1975, H–SC joined as a charter member of the Virginia College Conference which was quickly renamed the Old Dominion Athletic Conference (ODAC) in 1976.

The College's first long-term coach was alumnus "Yank" Bernier, who coached the team from 1912 to 1916 and again from 1923 to 1938. Bernier also holds the distinction of being the first athletic director for the college. The school saw its first real success in football when another alumnus, J. Stokeley Fulton, became the head coach in 1960, serving in that role until 1984 when he succumbed to cancer. Fulton is the longest tenured Hampden–Sydney head coach with 25 seasons and is the all-time winningest coach in school history compiling a 143–99–5 record. Fulton, inducted into the Virginia Sports Hall of Fame in 1977, lead his team to 9 conference championships, back-to-back Knute Rockne Bowls in 1971 and 1972, and was voted as the ODAC coach of the year 3 times.

The Tigers are currently coached by Vince Luvara, who is in his second season as head coach. The success that his predecessor, Marty Favret, had on the field (compiling a 151-90 record and 63% winning percentage over 24 seasons) has resulted in Tiger home football games becoming one of the most highly attended sporting events in all of Division III athletics – in 2012 Hampden–Sydney averaged 6723 fans per game, ranking 3rd nationally.

Through the 2025 season, Hampden–Sydney has compiled an official overall record of 584 wins, 497 losses, 38 ties; won 32 conference titles; appeared in 2 bowl games; and earned its way into 7 Division III tournament appearances with the most recent being in 2014.

== Seasons ==
Year	Coach	Overall	Conference	Standing	Bowl/playoffs	Rank^{#}	The Game
Independent (1892–1899)
1892	William Ford Bull	0–1					No Game
1893	William Ford Bull	0–1					Loss
1894	William Ford Bull	1–0					No Game
1895	William Ford Bull	0–0–1					No Game
1896	George H. Denny	2–1					Win
1897	David Todd Stuart	2–4					No Game
1898	James Sloan Kuykendall	2–0–1					Win
1899	Harry L. Shaner	4–1					No Game
Independent:		11–8–2					
Eastern Virginia Intercollegiate Athletic Association (1900–1921)
1900	Harry L. Shaner	4–0	3–0	1st			Win
1901	Harry L. Shaner	3–3	3–0	1st			Win
1902	Jason B. Parrish	3–2	3–1				Win, Win
1903	Unknown	1–1	1–1	2nd			Win
1904	No team	N/A	N/A				No Game
1905	Russel James	0–1–1					No Game
1906	Oliver Max Gardner	1–1	0–1				Loss
1907	James A. Nutter	3–4	1–2				Win
1908	L. W. Riess	5–4	2–2				Win
1909	L. W. Riess	3–4	2–1	2nd			Win
1910	Kemper Yancey	4–3	2–1	2nd			Loss
1911	B. R. Cecil	3–5	2–1	2nd			Loss
1912	Charles A. Bernier	1–6	1–1	2nd			Loss
1913	Charles A. Bernier	2–5	2–1	1st			Win
1914	Charles A. Bernier	3–3	2–1	1st			Loss, Win
1915	Charles A. Bernier	6–3	5–1	1st			Loss, Win
1916	Charles A. Bernier	4–3–3	4–1–3	1st			Tie, Tie
1917	Marvin C. Bowling	5–2–2	5–0–1	1st			Win, Win
1918	No coach	2–1	2–1	2nd			Win
1919	William L. Younger	4–3–1	4–1–1	T–1st			Win, Win
1920	Eddie Roundy	5–3	2–1	1st			Win
1921	Eddie Roundy	6–2–1	2–0	1st			Win
EVIAA:		68–59–8	48–19–6				
Independent (1922–1923)
1922	Eddie Roundy	1–8					No Game
1923	Charles A. Bernier	3–6					Win
Independent:		4–14					
Virginia–North Carolina Intercollegiate Athletic Conference (1924)
1924	Charles A. Bernier	3–4–2	1–0–2	1st			Tie
VNCIAC:		3–4–2	1–0–2				
Independent (1925–1927)
1925	Charles A. Bernier	3–5–1					Win
1926	Charles A. Bernier	5–2–3					Win
1927	Charles A. Bernier	4–5					Loss
Independent:		12–12–4					
Virginia Conference (1928–1932)
1928	Charles A. Bernier	3–6	2–3	T–6th			Win
1929	Charles A. Bernier	4–5	4–1	2nd			No Game
1930	Charles A. Bernier	2–6–1	2–3–1	6th			Loss
1931	Charles A. Bernier	3–6	2–3	T–4th			Loss
1932	Charles A. Bernier	3–4–2	1–1–2	4th			Tie, Tie
Virginia:		15–27–3	11–11–3				
Chesapeake Conference (1933–1936)
1933	Charles A. Bernier	3–4–2	2–1	2nd			Loss
1934	Charles A. Bernier	4–4–2	2–0–1	T–1st			Tie
1935	Charles A. Bernier	5–5	2–1	2nd			Loss
1936	Charles A. Bernier	3–5–1	1–1–1	4th			Loss
Chesapeake:		15–18–5	7–3–2				
Independent (1937–1945)
1937	Charles A. Bernier	2–8					Loss
1938	Charles A. Bernier	2–6					Loss
1939	Red Smith	4–5					Win
1940	Red Smith	4–5					Win
1941	Red Smith	2–6					Win
1942	Frank Summers	1–6–1					Tie
1943	No team	N/A	N/A				No Game
1944	Frank Summers	1–3–1					No Game
1945	Frank Summers	0–0–1					Tie
Independent:		16–39–3					
Mason–Dixon Conference (1946–1974)
1946	Frank Summers	2–7	2–2	4th			Loss, Win
1947	Morgan Tiller	1–8	1–2	5th			Loss
1948	Morgan Tiller	6–2–1	2–0	1st (Little Six)			Win
1949	Morgan Tiller	5–4	2–1	T–2nd			Win
1950	Morgan Tiller	4–5	1–3	7th			Loss
1951	Jim Hickey	4–3–2	1–1–2	4th			Tie
1952	Jim Hickey	5–3–1	2–1–1	2nd			Tie
1953	Jim Hickey	5–1–1	3–0–1	1st (Little Seven)			Win
1954	Jim Hickey	5–3	5–1	1st			Win
1955	Jim Hickey	8–1	6–1	T–1st (Little Seven)			Loss
1956	Bob Thalman	7–2	3–1	1st (Little Eight)			Win
1957	Bob Thalman	8–1	4–0	1st (Little Eight)			Win
1958	Bob Thalman	6–3	3–1	2nd			Loss
1959	Bob Thalman	5–3–1	2–1–1	T–2nd			Tie
1960	Stokeley Fulton	2–6	2–1	3rd			Loss
1961	Stokeley Fulton	3–6	2–2	2nd			Win
1962	Stokeley Fulton	6–4	3–1	2nd			Win
1963	Stokeley Fulton	6–3	2–1	2nd			Win
1964	Stokeley Fulton	6–4	3–0	1st			Win
1965	Stokeley Fulton	6–3	3–1	2nd			Loss
1966	Stokeley Fulton	5–4–1	5–0	1st			Win
1967	Stokeley Fulton	5–5	3–1	2nd			Loss
1968	Stokeley Fulton	3–5–2	1–3	T–5th			Loss
1969	Stokeley Fulton	6–4	3–1	2nd			Loss
1970	Stokeley Fulton	9–2	4–0	1st	L 6–7 Knute Rockne		Win
1971	Stokeley Fulton	10–1	4–0	1st	L 12–17 Knute Rockne		Win
1972	Stokeley Fulton	8–2	3–1	1st			Loss
1973	Stokeley Fulton	7–3	3–1	1st			Win
1974	Stokeley Fulton	6–4	2–2	3rd			Loss
Mason–Dixon:		159–102–9	79–30–5				
Independent (1975)
1975	Stokeley Fulton	7–2					Win
Independent:		7–2					
Old Dominion Athletic Conference (1976–present)
1976	Stokeley Fulton	7–4	3–1	T–1st			Loss
1977	Stokeley Fulton	9–2	4–0	1st	L NCAA D III Quarterfinal		Win
1978	Stokeley Fulton	5–5	2–2	T–2nd			Loss
1979	Stokeley Fulton	4–6	2–2	T–2nd			Loss
1980	Stokeley Fulton	3–7	2–3	T–3rd			Loss
1981	Stokeley Fulton	2–7–1	2–2–1	3rd			Tie
1982	Stokeley Fulton	4–4–1	4–1	1st			Win
1983	Stokeley Fulton	6–4	5–1	1st			Win
1984	Stokeley Fulton	8–2	3–2	T–2nd			Loss
1985	Carmen Palladino	5–5	2–3	2nd			Loss
1986	Joe Bush	8–2	4–1	2nd			Win
1987	Joe Bush	5–5	4–1	T–1st			Loss
1988	Joe Bush	6–4	2–2	2nd			Loss
1989	Joe Bush	6–4	2–2	2nd			Loss
1990	Joe Bush	6–4	2–2	3rd			Win
1991	Joe Bush	7–2–1	3–2	T–2nd			Win
1992	Joe Bush	6–4	3–2	2nd			Win
1993	Joe Bush	6–4	3–2	3rd			Loss
1994	Joe Bush	4–6	3–2	T–2nd			Win
1995	Joe Bush	4–6	2–3	3rd			Loss
1996	Joe Bush	3–7	1–4	5th			Loss
1997	Phil Culicerto	0–10	0–5	5th			Loss
1998	Phil Culicerto	3–7	2–3	4th			Loss
1999	Phil Culicerto	1–9	0–6	6th			Loss
2000	Marty Favret	4–6	2–4	5th			Loss
2001	Marty Favret	5–5	3–3	3rd			Win
2002	Marty Favret	8–2	5–1	2nd			Win
2003	Marty Favret	9–1	5–1	2nd		21	Win
2004	Marty Favret	8–2	5–1	2nd			Win
2005	Marty Favret	8–2	4–2	2nd			Win
2006	Marty Favret	4–6	4–2	4th			Win
2007	Marty Favret	9–2	6–0	1st	L NCAA D III First Round		Win
2008	Marty Favret	8–2	4–2	2nd			Loss
2009	Marty Favret	10–1	6–0	1st	L NCAA D III First Round	25	Win
2010	Marty Favret	9–2	5–1	2nd	L NCAA D III First Round	25	Win
2011	Marty Favret	8–3	5–1	T–1st	L NCAA D III First Round		Loss
2012	Marty Favret	6–4	4–3	4th			Loss
2013	Marty Favret	9–3	6–1	1st	L NCAA D III Second Round	18	Win
2014	Marty Favret	7–4	5–2	1st	L NCAA D III First Round		Loss
2015	Marty Favret	6–4	4–3	T–3rd			Loss
2016	Marty Favret	3–7	3–4	6th			Loss
2017	Marty Favret	6–4	4–2	T–2nd			Loss
2018	Marty Favret	4–5	4–3	T–2nd			Loss
2019	Marty Favret	1–9	0–8	9th			Loss
2020–21	Marty Favret	4–1	3–1	3rd			Loss
2021	Marty Favret	5–5	4–2	3rd			Loss
2022	Marty Favret	5–5	4–3	4th			Loss
2023	Marty Favret	6–4	4–3	4th			Loss
2024	Vince Luvara	5–5	3–4	T–5th			Loss
2025	Vince Luvara	4–0	2–0	T–1st			No Game
ODAC:		264–204–3	153–102–1				
Total:		573–488–38					
National championship Conference title Conference division title or championship game berth
