= 1984 Amherst Lord Jeffs football team =

American college football season

1984 Amherst Lord Jeffs football

Little Three champion
- Conference: Little Three Conference
- Record: 8–0 (2–0 Little Three)
- Head coach: Jim Ostendarp (26th season)
- Home stadium: Pratt Field

The 1984 Amherst Lord Jeffs football team was an American football team that represented Amherst College as a member of the Little Three Conference during the 1984 NCAA Division III football season. In their 26th year under head coach Jim Ostendarp, the Lord Jeffs compiled an 8–0 record, won the Little Three championship, and outscored opponents by a total of 192 to 56.

The 1984 season was the third perfect season in the history of Amherst's football program. The first was 1942, the second was 1964, and others followed in 2009, 2011, 2014, and 2015.

The team played its home games at Pratt Field in Amherst, Massachusetts.

== Schedule ==
Date	Opponent	Site	Result	Attendance	Source
September 22	at Bates	Lewiston, ME	W 21–5		
September 29	Bowdoin	Pratt Field; Amherst, MA	W 43–0		
October 6	at Middlebury	Middlebury, VT	W 28–10		
October 13	Colby	Pratt Field; Amherst, MA	W 19–7		
October 20	at Wesleyan	Andrus Field; Middletown, CT	W 6–0	7,200	
October 27	Tufts	Pratt Field; Amherst, MA	W 30–7	3,663	
November 3	at Trinity (CT)	Jessee Field; Hartford, CT	W 22–21	7,727	
November 10	Williams	Pratt Field; Amherst, MA (The Biggest Little Game in America)	W 23–3	10,000	
