= 2015 Amherst Lord Jeffs football team =

American college football season

2015 Amherst Lord Jeffs football

NESCAC champion
- Conference: New England Small College Athletic Conference
- Record: 8–0 (8–0 NESCAC)
- Head coach: E. J. Mills (19th season)
- Home stadium: Pratt Field

2015 New England Small College Athletic Conference football standings
	Conf.			Overall
Team	W		L	W		L
Amherst $	8	–	0	8	–	0
Trinity (CT)	7	–	1	7	–	1
Tufts	6	–	2	6	–	2
Middlebury	5	–	3	5	–	3
Wesleyan	5	–	3	5	–	3
Bates	2	–	6	2	–	6
Bowdoin	2	–	6	2	–	6
Hamilton	2	–	6	2	–	6
Williams	2	–	6	2	–	6
Colby	1	–	7	1	–	7
$ – Conference champion

The 2015 Amherst Lord Jeffs football team was an American football team that represented Amherst College as a member of the New England Small College Athletic Conference (NESCAC) during the 2015 NCAA Division III football season. In their 19th year under head coach E. J. Mills, the Lord Jeffs compiled an 8–0 record, won the NESCAC championship, and outscored opponents by a total of 221 to 79.

Key players included Anthony Bongiorno and Jaymie Spears. Jimmy Fairfield-Sonn received the 20th annual Joseph P. Zabilski Award, recognizing the top odffensive and defensive players in New England for Divisions II and III.

The 2015 season was one of seven perfect seasons in the history of Amherst's football program, the others coming in 1942, 1964, 1984, 2009, 2011, and 2014.

During the 2015 football season, the Amherst faculty and student body voted to remove "Lord Jeff" as the school's mascot. The school's trustees affirmed the decision in January 2016. The decision was based on the historical namesake (Jeffery Amherst, 1st Baron Amherst) actions against indigenous people in the 18th century. The school's athletic teams became known as the "Amherst Mammoths" starting with the 2016 football season.

The team played its home games at Pratt Field in Amherst, Massachusetts.

== Schedule ==
Date	Time	Opponent	Site	Result	Attendance	Source
September 26	1:00 p.m.	at Bates	Garcelon Field; Lewiston, ME	W 37–14	1,800	
October 3	1:00 p.m.	Bowdoin	Pratt Field; Amherst, MA	W 37–6	760	
October 10	2:00 p.m.	Middlebury	Pratt Field; Amherst, MA	W 24–7	712	
October 17	1:00 p.m.	at Colby	Harold Alfond Stadium; Waterville, ME	W 31–13	1,200	
October 24	1:00 p.m.	Wesleyan	Pratt Field; Amherst, MA	W 27–18	2,127	
October 31	1:00 p.m.	at Tufts	Ellis Oval; Somerville, MA	W 32–7	2,500	
November 7	1:00 p.m.	Trinity (CT)	Pratt Field; Amherst, MA	W 16–7	2,271	
November 14	12:00 p.m.	at Williams	Farley-Lamb Field; Williamstown, MA (The Biggest Little Game in America)	W 17–7	3,218	
All times are in Eastern time
