= 2011 Amherst Lord Jeffs football team =

American college football season

2011 Amherst Lord Jeffs football

NESCAC champion
- Conference: New England Small College Athletic Conference
- Record: 8–0 (8–0 NESCAC)
- Head coach: E. J. Mills (15th season)
- Home stadium: Pratt Field

2011 New England Small College Athletic Conference football standings
	Conf.			Overall
Team	W		L	W		L
Amherst $	8	–	0	8	–	0
Trinity (CT)	7	–	1	7	–	1
Williams	5	–	3	5	–	3
Bowdoin	4	–	4	4	–	4
Middlebury	4	–	4	4	–	4
Bates	3	–	5	3	–	5
Colby	3	–	5	3	–	5
Hamilton	3	–	5	3	–	5
Wesleyan	3	–	5	3	–	5
Tufts	0	–	8	0	–	8
$ – Conference champion

The 2011 Amherst Lord Jeffs football team was an American football team that represented Amherst College as a member of the New England Small College Athletic Conference (NESCAC) during the 2011 NCAA Division III football season. In their 15th year under head coach E. J. Mills, the Lord Jeffs compiled an 8–0 record, won the NESCAC championship, and outscored opponents by a total of 239 to 101.

The 2011 season was one of seven perfect seasons in the history of Amherst's football program, the others coming in 1942, 1964, 1984, 2009, 2014, and 2015.

The team played its home games at Pratt Field in Amherst, Massachusetts.

== Schedule ==
Date	Time	Opponent	Site	Result	Attendance	Source
September 24	1:00 p.m.	at Bates	Garcelon Field; Lewiston, ME	W 20–7	2,100	
October 1	1:00 p.m.	Bowdoin	Pratt Field; Amherst, MA	W 20–3		
October 8	1:30 p.m.	Middlebury	Pratt Field; Amherst, MA	W 48–28	450	
October 15	1:00 p.m.	at Colby	Harold Alfond Stadium; Waterville, ME	W 31–7	300	
October 22	1:00 p.m.	Wesleyan	Pratt Field; Amherst, MA	W 24–10	1,100	
October 29	1:00 p.m.	at Tufts	Ellis Oval; Somerville, MA	W 30–0	750	
November 5	1:00 p.m.	Trinity (CT)	Pratt Field; Amherst, MA	W 35–28	850	
November 12	12:00 p.m.	at Williams	Williamstown, MA (The Biggest Little Game in America)	W 31–18	8,914	
All times are in Eastern time
