= 2009 Amherst Lord Jeffs football team =

American college football season

2009 Amherst Lord Jeffs football

NESCAC champion
- Conference: New England Small College Athletic Conference
- Record: 8–0 (8–0 NESCAC)
- Head coach: E. J. Mills (13th season)
- Home stadium: Pratt Field

2009 New England Small College Athletic Conference football standings
	Conf.			Overall
Team	W		L	W		L
Amherst $	8	–	0	8	–	0
Trinity (CT)	6	–	2	6	–	2
Williams	6	–	2	6	–	2
Middlebury	5	–	3	5	–	3
Colby	4	–	4	4	–	4
Bowdoin	3	–	5	3	–	5
Wesleyan	3	–	5	3	–	5
Hamilton	2	–	6	2	–	6
Tufts	2	–	6	2	–	6
Bates	1	–	7	1	–	7
$ – Conference champion

The 2009 Amherst Lord Jeffs football team was an American football team that represented Amherst College as a member of the New England Small College Athletic Conference (NESCAC) during the 2009 NCAA Division III football season. In their 13th year under head coach E. J. Mills, the Lord Jeffs compiled an 8–0 record, won the NESCAC championship, and outscored opponents by a total of 162 to 83.

The 2009 season was Amherst's first outright NESCAC championship. It was also one of seven perfect seasons in the history of Amherst's football program, along with 1942, 1964, 1984, 2011, 2014, and 2015.

Key players included quarterback Alex Vetras and linebacker Sam Clark, both of whom received NESCAC player of the week honors during the 2009 season.

The team played its home games at Pratt Field in Amherst, Massachusetts.

== Schedule ==
Date	Opponent	Site	Result	Attendance	Source
September 26	at Hamilton	Clinton, NY	W 21–12		
October 3	Bowdoin	Pratt Field; Amherst, MA	W 13–12		
October 10	Middlebury	Pratt Field; Amherst, MA	W 20–10		
October 17	at Colby	Waterville, ME	W 23–13		
October 24	Wesleyan	Pratt Field; Amherst, MA	W 23–0		
October 31	at Tufts	Meford, MA	W 13–3		
November 7	Trinity (CT)	Pratt Field; Amherst, MA	W 23–12		
November 14	at Williams	Williamstown, MA (The Biggest Little Game in America)	W 26–21		
