= 2014 Amherst Lord Jeffs football team =

American college football season

2014 Amherst Lord Jeffs football

NESCAC champion
- Conference: New England Small College Athletic Conference
- Record: 8–0 (8–0 NESCAC)
- Head coach: E. J. Mills (18th season)
- Home stadium: Pratt Field

2014 New England Small College Athletic Conference football standings
	Conf.			Overall
Team	W		L	W		L
Amherst $	8	–	0	8	–	0
Wesleyan	7	–	1	7	–	1
Middlebury	6	–	2	6	–	2
Trinity (CT)	5	–	3	5	–	3
Bates	4	–	4	4	–	4
Tufts	4	–	4	4	–	4
Bowdoin	2	–	6	2	–	6
Colby	2	–	6	2	–	6
Williams	2	–	6	2	–	6
Hamilton	0	–	8	0	–	8
$ – Conference champion

The 2014 Amherst Lord Jeffs football team was an American football team that represented Amherst College as a member of the New England Small College Athletic Conference (NESCAC) during the 2014 NCAA Division III football season. In their 18th year under head coach E. J. Mills, the Lord Jeffs compiled an 8–0 record, won the NESCAC championship, and outscored opponents by a total of 173 to 71.

Key players included linebackers Chris Tamasi and Ned Deane and offensive tackle Sam Hart.

The 2014 season was one of seven perfect seasons in the history of Amherst's football program, along with 1942, 1964, 1984, 2009, 2011, and 2015.

The team played its home games at Pratt Field in Amherst, Massachusetts.

== Schedule ==
Date	Time	Opponent	Site	Result	Attendance	Source
September 20	1:00 p.m.	Bates	Pratt Field; Amherst, MA	W 14–6	815	
September 27	12:30 p.m.	at Bowdoin	Whittier Field; Brunswick, ME	W 30–7	2,036	
October 4	1:30 p.m.	at Middlebury	Alumni Stadium; Middlebury, VT	W 7–0	550	
October 11	1:00 p.m.	Colby	Pratt Field; Amherst, MA	W 35–10	950	
October 18	1:30 p.m.	at Wesleyan	Andrus Field; Middletown, CT	W 33–30 ^{OT}	3,750	
October 25	1:00 p.m.	Tufts	Pratt Field; Amherst, MA	W 30–3	1,345	
November 1	12:30 p.m.	at Trinity (CT)	Jessee/Miller Field; Hartford, CT	W 7–6	2,912	
November 8	4:00 p.m.	Williams	Pratt Field; Amherst, MA (The Biggest Little Game in America)	W 17–9	11,500	
All times are in Eastern time
