= Jim Ostendarp =

American gridiron football player and coach (1923–2005)

Biographical details
- Born: February 15, 1923; Baltimore, Maryland, U.S.
- Died: December 15, 2005 (aged 82); Holyoke, Massachusetts, U.S.

Playing career

Football
- 1946–1947: Drexel
- 1948–1949: Bucknell
- 1950–1951: New York Giants
- 1952: Montreal Alouettes
- Position: Halfback

Coaching career (HC unless noted)

Football
- 1953–1954: Bucknell (assistant)
- 1955–1957: Williams (assistant)
- 1958: Cornell (assistant)
- 1959–1991: Amherst

Wrestling
- 1953–1955: Bucknell

Head coaching record
- Overall: 168–91–5 (football)

James E. Ostendarp (February 15, 1923 – December 15, 2005) was an American gridiron football player and coach. He played professional football for the New York Giants of the National Football League (NFL) from 1950 to 1951 and the Montreal Alouettes of the Interprovincial Rugby Football Union—a forerunner of the Canadian Football League (CFL)—in 1952. Ostendarp was the head football coach at Amherst College for 33 years, from 1959 to 1991, compiling a record of 168–91–5. He also served as president of the American Football Coaches Association in 1982.

== Early years ==
Ostendarp was born in Baltimore, Maryland in 1923. He began playing football at age eight and later recalled his early years playing the game as follows:

I grew up in Baltimore and all the kids play football in that city. On a Sunday afternoon there must be 50 kids' games going on there. They're all neighborhood teams. I started playing first for a team that was formed by the kids on the street I lived on. We played against kids from the nearby streets. When I was 10 I played for a club team. I mean we just got together and formed a club and gave it a name. We sold fruit and held raffles to get the money to buy uniforms.

Ostendarp later attended Baltimore Polytechnic Institute, where coaches told him he was too small to play high school football. Refusing to accept their decision, Ostendarp established his ability by playing semi-professional football on Sundays. He made the Polytechnic high school football team as a senior and earned All-State honors.

He received a scholarship to the University of Maryland and played one year of football there. With the outbreak of World War II, he joined the U.S. Army and served as a paratrooper in the 82nd Airborne Division. He fought in the European Theater of Operations and played football with the 7th Army team.

After the war, in 1946, Ostendarp enrolled and participated in football, baseball, basketball, and track at Drexel University. Ostendarp transferred to Bucknell University in Lewisburg, Pennsylvania in 1948, where he set the football team's rushing record in 1949 with an average of 6.9 yards per carry.

== Professional football ==
In July 1950, Osetendarp signed with the New York Giants of the National Football League. He played as a halfback for the Giants during the 1950 and 1951 NFL seasons. The Giants were 19–4–1 in 1950 and 1951, with Ostendarp serving as a backup to the team's leading rushers Eddie Price and Choo Choo Roberts. Ostendarp appeared in seven games for the 1950 Giants and scored two touchdowns, including one against his hometown Baltimore Colts on November 19, 1950. He also rushed for 144 yards in 1950, including a career-long 55-yard run against the New York Yankees on December 3, 1950. Ostendarp also returned nine punts for 117 yards and four kickoffs for 83 yards.

During the 1952 season, Ostendarp played halfback for the Montreal Alouettes in the Canadian Football League. In an interview with The Montreal Gazette, Ostendarp discussed the process of adjusting to Canadian rules:

When I first came up here and learned that you only had three downs in which to make 10 yards. I wondered if a team ever moved the sticks. All I could think of is how difficult it is in American football where there are four downs. But I soon saw that it could be done. In fact, I think three downs makes it a better game for the crowd.

Ostendarp made the adjustment to Canadian rules, led the Big Four in rushing yards, and received the Lord Calvert Trophy as the Most Valuable Player on the 1952 Alouettes team.

Following the 1952 season, Ostendarp was reported to have had a contract disagreement with Montreal's team management. In early June 1953, The Montreal Gazette reported that Ostendarp had agreed to salary terms with the Alouettes, but Ostendarp announced a short time later that he had accepted a coaching position at Bucknell University and would not be returning to the Alouettes.

== Early coaching career ==
Ostendarp began an informal coaching career in 1952 while playing for the Montreal Alouettes. While walking near the campus of McGill University, he was approached by a group of ten- to twelve-year-olds who were playing football. He recalled his introduction to coaching as follows:

I showed them a few fundamental things like how to carry the ball and how to hold it for a kick or a pass. A few days later I was up there again and they said they were going to form a team and would I coach them. I taught them one formation and gave them a few plays -- a smash off tackle, an end sweep and a couple of pass patterns. A couple of Sundays later they waited for me after the game at the stadium to tell me they'd won their first game.

He began his formal coaching career as an assistant football coach at Bucknell from 1953 to 1954. He later served as an assistant coach at Williams College (1955–57) and Cornell University (1958).

== Amherst College ==
=== Coaching and awards ===
In March 1959, Ostendarp was hired as the head football coach at Amherst College. He held that position for 33 years from 1959 to 1991. He led the Amherst Lord Jeffs to undefeated, untied seasons in 1964 and 1984. He also led his teams to 13 Little Three (Amherst, Williams and Wesleyan) championships and nine one-loss seasons. In his 33 years as head coach, Ostendarp compiled an overall record of 168–91–5 and a .646 winning percentage. Four of Ostendarp's Amherst players went on to play in the NFL: Sean Clancy '78, Doug Swift '70, Jean Fugett '72 and Freddie Scott '74.

Ostendarp received the Kodak AFCA New England Coach of the Year award in 1961 and 1964; the UPI Small College Coach of the Year award in 1964; the New England Football Writers' Division II and III Coach of the Year award in 1984; and the Gridiron Club of Boston's New England Division II and III Coach of the Year award in 1984.

Ostendarp was also one of the first football coaches to use computerized statistics to develop his game strategy for opposing teams. In the early 1960s, some of Ostendarp's players used a computer at the University of Massachusetts to compile opponents' statistics to help their coach plan for upcoming games.

Ostendarp announced his resignation as Amherst's head coach in March 1992 at age 68.

=== Influence on players ===
Ostendarp also served on Amherst's faculty as a professor of physical education. He became known for the influence he had on players beyond the football field. Asked by a reporter whether he was interested in coaching at a bigger school, Ostendarp replied, "Where would you go after Amherst?" His players referred to him affectionately as "the Darp" and considered him "one part football coach and one part professor." According to a tribute published by Amherst College following Ostendarp's death, his attire at football games was legendary: "It was easy to spot him on the sidelines. Regardless of the weather, Jim always wore his dark three-piece suit and Fedora."

One of Ostendarp's former players noted, "He was a professor who happened to teach football." He emphasized balance and making time for family. One of his former players recalled that Coach Ostendarp "made a point of introducing his players to classical music and art, sometimes taking them to the Mead Art Museum during afternoon practice time." The Boston Globe cited the following incident as an example of Ostendarp's balanced approach to athletics:

During a practice session one afternoon in the 1980s, Amherst College football coach James E. Ostendarp stopped his players' drills so they could pause and appreciate the beauty of a sunset over the Berkshires. The moment was indicative of Mr. Ostendarp's approach to the game, his former players said, as he instructed them to appreciate more than just football in their lives."

Joe Schell, who played for Ostendarp in the late 1960s, recalled that Ostendarp made sure his players were good students and good citizens. Schell, who went on to become an investment banker, recalled, "For me, next to my father, he was the most influential man in my life."

=== ESPN controversy ===
When ESPN sought to televise the 100th annual game between Amherst and Williams College, Ostendarp refused to accommodate the network's demand to change the kickoff. The national broadcast would have generated substantial revenue for the school, but Ostendarp held firm, telling The Wall Street Journal, "We're in education. We aren't in the entertainment business. ... We don't have the stadiums, the crowds, the bands, the cheerleaders or the teams to play on television. We're No. 1 in the country in small academics. To put us on TV and say, 'This is Amherst,' well, it just doesn't measure up." When some Amherst alumni protested his decision, Ostendarp said he couldn't care less, adding, "I've got tenure. I'm a full professor." Ostendarp's decision drew national media coverage. The Boston Globe called it "A Glorious Blackout" and added: "When the Man-of-the-Year and Coach-of-the-Year awards are considered, every list should contain the name of Jim Ostendarp. The football coach of Amherst College represents values that have almost disappeared."

== Family ==
Ostendarp married Shirley Reidinger in 1953. They lived in Sunderland, Massachusetts, and had three sons, Jim, Jan, and Carl, and four daughters, Teresa, Anne, Beth, and Heidi. In 1981, Ostendarp's son, Jan Ostendarp, returned a punt 92 yards for a touchdown against Williams to lead Amherst to its first Little Three championship since 1968. In December 2005, Ostendarp died at the Soldier's Home in Holyoke, Massachusetts, of complications from Alzheimer's disease.

On October 20, 2007, at Amherst's homecoming football game, Amherst President Anthony W. Marx and former Amherst players spoke about Ostendarp and unveiled a bronze plaque (pictured above) dedicated in his honor.

== Head coaching record ==
=== Football ===
Year	Team	Overall	Conference	Standing	Bowl/playoffs
Amherst Lord Jeffs (Little Three) (1959–1991)
1959	Amherst	4–3–1			
1960	Amherst	5–3			
1961	Amherst	7–1	1–1	2nd	
1962	Amherst	7–1			
1963	Amherst	7–1			
1964	Amherst	8–0	2–0	1st	
1965	Amherst	7–1			
1966	Amherst	6–2	1–1	2nd	
1967	Amherst	3–4–1	1–1	2nd	
1968	Amherst	7–1	2–0	1st	
1969	Amherst	6–2	1–1	2nd	
1970	Amherst	3–5	1–1	2nd	
1971	Amherst	6–2	1–1	2nd	
1972	Amherst	7–1	1–1	2nd	
1973	Amherst	7–1	1–1	2nd	
1974	Amherst	5–3	1–1	2nd	
1975	Amherst	4–4	0–2	3rd	
1976	Amherst	3–5			
1977	Amherst	5–2			
1978	Amherst	3–5			
1979	Amherst	3–5			
1980	Amherst	2–6			
1981	Amherst	5–3			
1982	Amherst	7–1			
1983	Amherst	5–2–1			
1984	Amherst	8–0			
1985	Amherst	7–1			
1986	Amherst	6–3			
1987	Amherst	6–2			
1988	Amherst	4–4			
1989	Amherst	4–4			
1990	Amherst	1–7			
1991	Amherst	0–7–1			
Amherst:		168–91–5			
Total:		168–91–5			
National championship Conference title Conference division title or championship game berth
