= Marty Favret =

American athletic director and football coach (born c. 1962)

Current position
- Title: Athletic director
- Team: Lees–McRae
- Conference: Conference Carolinas

Biographical details
- Born: c. 1962 (age 63–64); Washington, D.C., U.S.
- Education: Catholic University of America (1984)

Playing career

Basketball
- 1981–1984: Catholic University
- Position: Shooting guard

Coaching career (HC unless noted)

Football
- 1989: Gonzaga HS (DC) (JV)
- 1991–1993: Gonzaga HS (DC) (OC/JV)
- 1994–1999: Catholic University (AHC/OC)
- 2000–2023: Hampden–Sydney

Administrative career (AD unless noted)
- 2000–2024: Hampden–Sydney (assoc. AD)
- 2024–present: Lees–McRae

Head coaching record
- Overall: 151–90
- Tournaments: 1–6 (NCAA D-III playoffs)

Accomplishments and honors

Championships
- 6 ODAC (2007–2009, 2011, 2013–2014)

Marty Favret (born c. 1962) is an American athletic director and former college football coach. He is the athletic director for Lees–McRae College, a position he has held since 2024. He was the head football coach for Hampden–Sydney College from 2000 to 2023. He also coached for Gonzaga College High School and Catholic University of America. He played college basketball for Catholic University as a shooting guard.

== Head coaching record ==
Year	Team	Overall	Conference	Standing	Bowl/playoffs	D3^{#}
Hampden–Sydney Tigers (Old Dominion Athletic Conference) (2000–2023)
2000	Hampden–Sydney	4–6	2–4	T–4th		
2001	Hampden–Sydney	5–5	3–3	T–2nd		
2002	Hampden–Sydney	8–2	5–1	2nd		
2003	Hampden–Sydney	9–1	5–1	2nd		21
2004	Hampden–Sydney	8–2	5–1	2nd		
2005	Hampden–Sydney	8–2	4–2	T–2nd		
2006	Hampden–Sydney	4–6	4–2	T–2nd		
2007	Hampden–Sydney	8–3	5–1	T–1st	L NCAA Division III First Round	
2008	Hampden–Sydney	8–2	4–2	T–1st		
2009	Hampden–Sydney	10–1	6–0	1st	L NCAA Division III First Round	25
2010	Hampden–Sydney	9–2	5–1	2nd	L NCAA Division III First Round	25
2011	Hampden–Sydney	8–3	5–1	T–1st	L NCAA Division III First Round	25
2012	Hampden–Sydney	6–4	4–3	T–3rd		
2013	Hampden–Sydney	9–3	6–1	1st	L NCAA Division III Second Round	18
2014	Hampden–Sydney	7–4	5–2	T–1st	L NCAA Division III First Round	
2015	Hampden–Sydney	6–4	4–3	T–3rd		
2016	Hampden–Sydney	3–7	3–4	6th		
2017	Hampden–Sydney	6–4	4–2	T–2nd		
2018	Hampden–Sydney	4–5	4–3	T–2nd		
2019	Hampden–Sydney	1–9	0–8	9th		
2020–21	Hampden–Sydney	4–1	3–1	3rd		
2021	Hampden–Sydney	5–5	4–2	3rd		
2022	Hampden–Sydney	5–5	4–3	4th		
2023	Hampden–Sydney	6–4	4–3	4th		
Hampden–Sydney:		151–90	98–54			
Total:		151–90				
National championship Conference title Conference division title or championship game berth
