= E. J. Mills (American football) =

American football coach

Current position
- Title: Head coach
- Team: Amherst
- Conference: NESCAC
- Record: 158–74

Biographical details
- Born: c. 1966 (age 59–60)

Playing career

Baseball
- 1984–1987: Dayton

Coaching career (HC unless noted)

Football
- 1988–1989: Midlakes HS (NY) (assistant)
- 1990: Albany (GA)
- 1991: Albany (DB)
- 1992: Ramapo (DC)
- 1993–1996: Amherst (DC)
- 1997–present: Amherst

Softball
- 1995–1996: Amherst

Head coaching record
- Overall: 158–74 (football); 26–22–1 (softball)

Accomplishments and honors

Championships
- Football; 6 NESCAC (2000, 2009, 2011, 2013–2015)

E. J. Mills (born c. 1966) is an American college football coach. He is the head football coach for Amherst College, a position he has held since 1997.

== Head coaching record ==
=== Football ===
Year	Team	Overall	Conference	Standing	Bowl/playoffs
Amherst Lord Jeffs / Mammoths (New England Small College Athletic Conference) (1997–present)
1997	Amherst	7–1	7–1	T–1st	
1998	Amherst	5–3	5–3	T–4th	
1999	Amherst	5–3	5–3	T–3rd	
2000	Amherst	7–1	7–1	T–1st	
2001	Amherst	7–1	7–1	2nd	
2002	Amherst	6–2	6–2	3rd	
2003	Amherst	4–4	4–4	T–5th	
2004	Amherst	6–2	6–2	T–2nd	
2005	Amherst	5–3	5–3	5th	
2006	Amherst	5–3	5–3	4th	
2007	Amherst	4–4	4–4	T–5th	
2008	Amherst	5–3	5–3	T–3rd	
2009	Amherst	8–0	8–0	1st	
2010	Amherst	6–2	6–2	3rd	
2011	Amherst	8–0	8–0	1st	
2012	Amherst	6–2	6–2	4th	
2013	Amherst	7–1	7–1	T–1st	
2014	Amherst	8–0	8–0	1st	
2015	Amherst	8–0	8–0	1st	
2016	Amherst	4–4	4–4	5th	
2017	Amherst	7–2	7–2	T–2nd	
2018	Amherst	8–1	8–1	2nd	
2019	Amherst	4–5	4–5	T–5th	
2020–21	No team—COVID-19				
2021	Amherst	5–4	5–4	4th	
2022	Amherst	2–7	2–7	T–9th	
2023	Amherst	4–5	4–5	6th	
2024	Amherst	2–7	2–7	T–8th	
2025	Amherst	5–4	5–4	T–4th	
2026	Amherst	0–0	0–0		
Amherst:		158–74	158–74		
Total:		158–74			
National championship Conference title Conference division title or championship game berth
