= 2014 Hampden–Sydney Tigers football team =

American college football season

2014 Hampden–Sydney Tigers football

ODAC champion

Division III Playoffs First Round, L 7–52 vs. Wesley (DE)
- Conference: Old Dominion Athletic Conference
- Record: 7–4 (5–2 ODAC)
- Head coach: Marty Favret (15th season)
- Offensive scheme: Spread
- Defensive coordinator: Wes Dodson (8th season)
- Base defense: 3–3–5
- Home stadium: Everett Stadium

Uniform

2014 Old Dominion Athletic Conference football standings
	Conf.			Overall
Team	W		L	W		L
Bridgewater +	5	–	2	8	–	2
Emory & Henry +	5	–	2	8	–	2
Guilford +	5	–	2	8	–	2
Hampden–Sydney +^	5	–	2	7	–	4
Randolph–Macon	3	–	4	5	–	5
Shenandoah	2	–	5	4	–	6
Washington and Lee	2	–	5	2	–	8
Catholic University	1	–	6	3	–	7
+ – Conference co-champions; ^ – NCAA Division III playoff participant

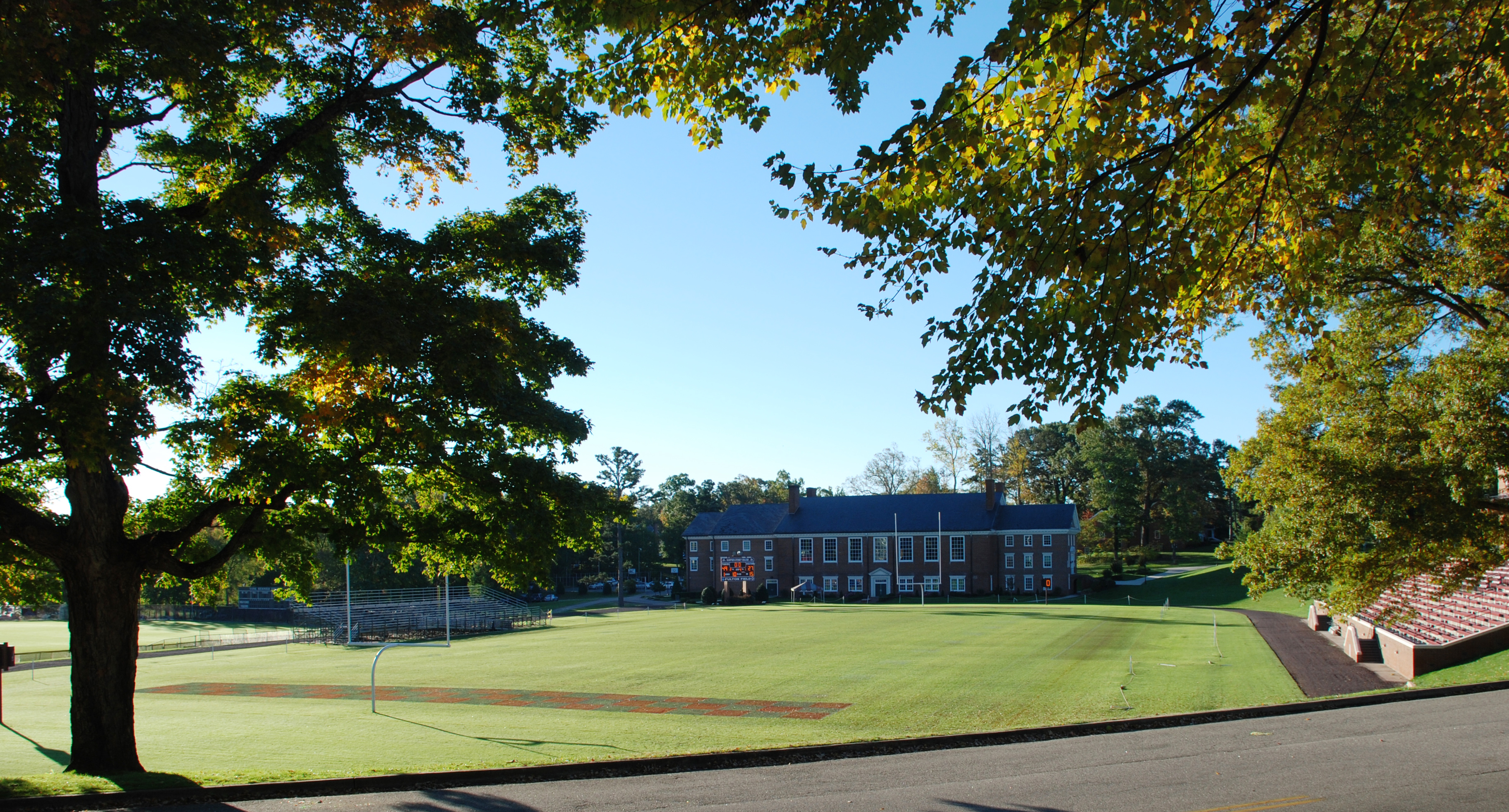
Fulton Field at Hampden–Sydney

The 2014 Hampden–Sydney Tigers football team represented Hampden–Sydney College in the 2014 NCAA Division III football season. It was the Tigers' 120th overall, the 39th as a member of the Old Dominion Athletic Conference. The team was led by Marty Favret, in his fifteenth year as head coach, and played its home games at Lewis C. Everett Stadium in Death Valley, Hampden–Sydney, Virginia. They finished the season 7–4, 5–2 in ODAC play to finish in first place in the conference. They received an automatic bid to the Division III Playoffs where they lost to #4 Wesley (DE) in the first round.

== Schedule ==
Date	Time	Opponent	Rank	Site	Result	Attendance
September 6	1:00 pm	at No. 16 Wabash*	No. 21	Hollett Stadium; Crawfordsville, IN (Gentlemen's Classic)	L 21–34	4,638
September 13	1:00 pm	Christopher Newport*	No. 24	Everett Stadium; Hampden–Sydney, VA	W 35–30	7,420
September 20	1:00 pm	Coast Guard*	No. 25	Everett Stadium; Hampden–Sydney, VA	W 56–0	8,004
October 4	1:00 pm	at Catholic		DuFour Field; Washington, D.C.	W 62–14	865
October 11	1:00 pm	at Washington & Lee		Wilson Field; Lexington, VA	W 55–32	2,845
October 18	1:00 pm	Emory & Henry^{†}	No. 25	Everett Stadium; Hampden–Sydney, VA	W 49–27	5,113
October 25	1:00 pm	at Shenandoah	No. 24	Shentel Stadium; Winchester, VA	W 45–27	3,087
November 1	1:00 pm	at Bridgewater	No. 22	Jopson Athletic Complex; Bridgewater, VA	L 9–34	1,359
November 8	1:00 pm	Guilford^{Δ}		Everett Stadium; Hampden–Sydney, VA	W 35–28 ^{OT}	4,200
November 15	1:00 pm	Randolph–Macon		Everett Stadium; Hampden–Sydney, VA (The Game)	L 10–24	11,525
November 22	12:00 pm	at No. 4 Wesley (DE)*		Miller Stadium; Dover, DE	L 7–52	985
*Non-conference game; ^{†}Homecoming; ^{Δ} Hall of Fame Game; Rankings from D3football.com poll released prior to the game; All times are in Eastern time

== Game summaries ==
=== Wabash ===
Gentlemen's Classic

Team	1	2	3	4	Total
#21 Hampden–Sydney	7	7	0	7	21
• #16 Wabash	7	10	10	7	34

- Location: Crawfordsville, IN
- Game start: 1:02 p.m. EST
- Game attendance: 4,638
- Game weather: 68°, mostly cloudy, winds WNW 7 mph
- Referee: Dalon Myricks

The Tigers' opened the 2014 season on the road against Wabash, who they lost to in Crawfordsville, Indiana 20–40. The game was the inaugural playing of the "Gentlemen's Classic", a match-up between both all-men's colleges. Hampden–Sydney hit the scoreboard first, using a 60-yard strike from Nash Nance to Holton Walker to go up 7–0 on its second possession. The Little Giants scored quickly, using 11 plays on a 69-yard drive that led to Tyler Holmes four-yard run. After traded punts, Hampden-Sydney took its fourth drive into the second quarter, and finished off a six play drive with Nance scoring on a goal line push.

The Tiger defense forced a three-and-out on the ensuing drive, but four plays later, Ethan Buresh picked off Nance and returned the turnover 41 yards for the game-tying touchdown. Wabash's defense then forced a punt from the Tigers on the next drive, which was downed at the Wabash 49-yard line. Wabash drove to the red zone but the Tiger defense held and forced a 39-yard field goal from Andrew Tutsie to give the Little Giants a 17–14 lead going into halftime.

The Little Giants controlled the third quarter, scoring ten points while possessing the ball for just over 13 minutes. The Tigers, behind Freddie Potter, had a fourth-and-one stop on Wabash's first drive, but the Little Giants scored a touchdown on its second drive – a 26-yard touchdown pass from Michael Putko to Houston Hodges. Hampden–Sydney fumbled on its next drive, and Wabash capitalized with a 29-yard field goal from Tutsie. Wabash again scored on its first drive of the fourth quarter, going up 34–14 while driving 68 yards in 11 plays. Two drives later, the Tigers scored again, with Walker catching his second touchdown of the day, this time from 34 yards out.

=== Christopher Newport ===
Team	1	2	3	4	Total
Christopher Newport	6	15	7	2	30
• #24 Hampden–Sydney	0	21	7	7	35

- Location: Hampden–Sydney, VA
- Game start: 1:00 p.m. EST
- Game attendance: 7,420
- Game weather: high 60°s, rainy, winds NW 3.5 mph
- Referee: Ben Smith

=== Coast Guard ===
Team	1	2	3	4	Total
Coast Guard	0	0	0	0	0
• #25 Hampden–Sydney	14	14	14	14	56

- Location: Hampden–Sydney, VA
- Game start: 1:00 p.m. EST
- Game attendance: 8,004
- Game weather: 77°, very sunny, winds S 4.6 mph
- Referee: Pat Ryan

=== Catholic ===
Team	1	2	3	4	Total
• Hampden–Sydney	10	31	14	7	62
Catholic	0	0	0	14	14

- Location: Washington, D.C.
- Game start: 1:00 p.m. EST
- Game attendance: 865
- Game weather: 80°s, overcast and warm, winds NNW 18.4 mph

=== Washington & Lee ===
Team	1	2	3	4	Total
• Hampden–Sydney	14	21	10	10	55
Washington & Lee	3	14	7	8	32

- Location: Lexington, VA
- Game start: 1:00 p.m. EST
- Game attendance: 2,845
- Game weather: 62°, rain, winds NNE 3.5 mph
- Referee: Moe Rummel

=== Emory & Henry ===
Team	1	2	3	4	Total
Emory & Henry	7	6	0	14	27
• #25 Hampden–Sydney	14	21	7	7	49

- Location: Hampden–Sydney, VA
- Game start: 1:00 p.m. EST
- Game attendance: 5,113
- Game weather: 70°, sunny, winds WNW 8.1 mph
- Referee: Pat Ryan

=== Shenandoah ===
Team	1	2	3	4	Total
• #24 Hampden–Sydney	7	10	14	14	45
Shenandoah	10	3	0	14	27

- Location: Winchester, VA
- Game start: 1:00 p.m. EST
- Game attendance: 3,087
- Game weather: 71°, winds WSW 10.4 mph
- Referee: Ben Smith

=== Bridgewater ===
Team	1	2	3	4	Total
Hampden–Sydney	6	0	3	0	9
• #22 Bridgewater	7	7	13	7	34

- Location: Bridgewater, VA
- Game start: 1:00 p.m. EST
- Game attendance: 1,357
- Game weather: 46°, rainy and cloudy, winds NNW 19 mph
- Referee: Dick Foster

=== Guilford ===
Team	1	2	3	4	OT	Total
Guilford	7	0	3	18	0	28
• Hampden–Sydney	7	7	7	7	7	35

- Location: Hampden–Sydney, VA
- Game start: 1:00 p.m. EST
- Game attendance: 4,200
- Game weather: 53°, sunny, winds SSW 1 mph
- Referee: Mike Shepherd

=== Randolph–Macon ===
The Game

Team	1	2	3	4	Total
• Randolph–Macon	0	7	7	10	24
Hampden–Sydney	0	0	7	3	10

- Location: Hampden–Sydney, VA
- Game start: 1:00 p.m. EST
- Game attendance: 11,525
- Game weather: 45°, sunny, winds E 1 mph

=== Wesley (DE) ===
Division III Playoffs Round 1

Team	1	2	3	4	Total
Hampden–Sydney	0	7	0	0	7
• #4 Wesley (DE)	42	7	0	3	52

- Location: Dover, DE
- Game start: 12:00 p.m. EST
- Game attendance: 985
- Game weather: 47°, winds SSW 7 mph
- Referee: Brian McGrath

== Ranking movements ==
Ranking movements Legend: ██ Increase in ranking ██ Decrease in ranking — = Not ranked RV = Received votes
	Week												
Poll	Pre	1	2	3	4	5	6	7	8	9	10	11	Final
D3Football.com	21	24	25	24	RV	RV	25	24	22	RV	RV	RV	—
AFCA Coaches	Not released			RV	RV	RV	RV	25	22	RV	RV	RV	RV
BennetRank	12	16	19	20	17	10	16	18	15	26	24	31	44

== Personnel ==
=== Coaching staff ===
Name	Position	Seasons at Hampden–Sydney	Alma mater
Marty Favret	Head coach	15th	Catholic (1984)
Wes Dodson	Defensive coordinator	8th	Western Michigan (2002)
Zeke Traylor	Offensive Line	7th	Hampden–Sydney (2006)
Nick Goins	Linebackers	2nd	Hanover (2001)
Joey Partin	Tight Ends/H-Backs	2nd	Hampden–Sydney (2013)
Scott Riddle	Quarterbacks	3rd	Elon (2011)
Troy Shaffer	Special Teams Coordinator/Wide Receivers	3rd	Bridgewater (1997)
Ahmaad Smith	Defensive Backs	4th	Tennessee State (2006)
Joe Freeland	Defensive Line	3rd	Bridgewater (1980)
Penn Stephenson	Defensive Line/Video Coordinator	2nd	Hampden–Sydney (2010)
Reference: 2014 Hampden–Sydney Tigers football coaching staff

=== Roster ===
2014 Hampden–Sydney Tigers roster
Quarterbacks: 4 Kyle Farlow Junior; 6 Nash Nance Senior; 9 Neal Reynolds Freshman; 14 Tyler Doane Freshman; 15 Edgar Moore Sophomore; 17 Bailey Tyner Freshman; Running backs: 26 Ronnie Stringfield Freshman; 28 Tyler Fowler Junior; 29 Jovan Burton Sophomore; 34 Jay Evans Freshman; 37 Brady Macko Senior; 43 Blake Henderson Freshman; 45 Mike Demasi Freshman; H-Backs: 22 Craig Sprouse Senior; 23 Carter Cunningham Sophomore; 39 Austin Seay Sophomore; Wide receivers: 2 Cam Johnson Freshman; 5 Joey Kernan Senior; 13 Holton Walker Senior; 18 Michael Mey Junior; 20 Marshall Bagley Junior; 21 Owen Costello Sophomore; 25 Jeff Rowell Junior; 31 Austin Perryman Junior; 35 Kolin Atkinson Senior; 46 Mitchell Pereira – Senior; 80 Fuller Clark Senior; 82 Kyle Deivert Junior; 85 Cole Drennan Sophomore; 88 Tyler Dobrucky Freshman; Tight ends: 42 Patrick Kline Freshman; 83 Mel Savarese Junior; 86 Joey Druhan Senior	Offensive line: 53 P.J. Melnick Junior; 56 Coleman Epps Freshman; 59 Thomas Vinyard Sophomore; 60 Tyler Ritter Senior; 62 J.G. Jones Sophomore; 63 Hayes Donahue Freshman; 64 Dalton Lee Junior; 65 Scott McCombs Freshman; 67 Zach Criswell Freshman; 68 Jordan Parke Sophomore; 69 Franklin Markley Sophomore; 70 Luke Fussy Sophomore; 72 Todd Edstrom Junior; 73 Wesley Spencer Freshman; 74 Taz DelDonna Sophomore; 75 Daniel Fogleman Sophomore; 76 Connor Kearney Sophomore; 78 Will Moore Freshman; 79 Brian Mahan Sophomore; Defensive line: 52 Joe Everette Freshman; 55 Freddie Potter Senior; 91 Scott Markland Senior; 94 Michael Bazemore Senior; 96 Kordell Strauss Junior; 97 Tyler Palmer Junior; 98 Ryan Jones Sophomore; 99 Nick Manuel Senior; Defensive backs: 39 Ford Scott Junior; Defensive ends: 47 Kamron White Junior; 54 Benjamin Carson Sophomore; 58 A.J. Eubank Junior; 70 John Brennan Sophomore; 92 Matthew Dirr Freshman; 95 William Murray Junior	Linebackers: 7 Nolan Groce Freshman; 8 Robert Stack Senior; 11 Ryan Maddox Sophomore; 22 Kellen Winningham Freshman; 28 Marcus Goodman Sophomore; 30 Justin DeChirico Senior; 33 Nick Browning Sophomore; 34 Jay Brooks Junior; 35 Henry O'Neal Freshman; 37 Marcus Wakelyn Freshman; 41 Christian Wilder Sophomore; 42 Josh Doggett Senior; 43 Robert Rhyne Sophomore; 46 Ethan Johnson Freshman; 48 James Evans Freshman; 48 Alex Sefton Junior; 50 Nick Martin Junior; 57 Matt Watson Senior; Safeties: 6 Kyler Vela Freshman; 9 Shreve Rohle Senior; 17 Jordan Beck Freshman; 19 Bo Gilbertson Sophomore; 27 Jake Edmonds Freshman; 29 Korbin Bordonie Freshman; 31 Harry Smith Senior; 32 John Regan Sophomore; 40 Jamal Woolridge Sophomore; 45 John Moore Senior; Free safeties: 3 Larry Haskins Junior; 14 Will Banning Senior; 21 Kendall Blankenship Freshman; Punters: 90 Jordan Chalkley Junior; Kickers: 87 Will Estes Junior; 89 Max Antwerpes Senior
Reference: 2014 Hampden–Sydney Tigers football roster

== After the season ==
=== Awards ===
After the end of the regular season, multiple Hampden–Sydney players were recognized for their on-field performance with a variety of recognitions. The ODAC recognized several players for their individual performances with various awards. On November 25, 2014, senior receiver Holton Walker, senior linebacker Josh Doggett, and senior defensive back John Moore were all selected to the ODAC First Team. Earning Second Team honors were senior quarterback Nash Nance, junior offensive lineman P.J. Melnick, senior defensive lineman Freddie Potter, senior linebacker Robert Stack, and junior defensive back Sidney Henry. Additionally, senior slot receiver Joey Kernan, senior tight end Joey Druhan, and senior place kicker Max Antwerpes earned Third Team accolades.

On December 3, 2014, the Touchdown Club of Richmond announced its player of the year awards for each football position, awarded to the best players from all of Division II, Division III, the NAIA and the USCAA in the Commonwealth of Virginia. Two Tigers won player of the year awards: Holton Walker for best wide receiver and Josh Doggett for best linebacker.

On December 10, 2014, Nash Nance was awarded The Lanier Award (named in honor of Willie Lanier), which is presented annually to the top football player in either Division II or Division III in the Commonwealth of Virginia. Nance was the first Hampden–Sydney athlete to win the award since Drew Smith was named the top player in the Commonwealth in 2007.
