= Hampden–Sydney vs. Randolph–Macon rivalry =

American college sports rivalry

Randolph–Macon vs. Hampden-Sydney rivalry
- Hampden–Sydney Tigers Randolph–Macon Yellow Jackets
- Sport: Football & Basketball
- First meeting: 1893
- Latest meeting: November 14, 2026; Hampden–Sydney 36, Randolph–Macon 27
- Next meeting: November 13, 2027
- Trophy: The Game Ball

Statistics
- Total meetings: 130
- All-time series: Randolph–Macon leads 60–59–11
- Largest victory: Hampden–Sydney, 62–0 (1917)
- Longest win streak: Randolph–Macon, 12 (2014–Present)
- Current win streak: Hampden–Sydney, 1 (2026–Present)

Locations of Hampden–Sydney and Randolph–Macon

The Randolph-Macon vs. Hampden–Sydney rivalry is a sports rivalry between the Hampden–Sydney College Tigers and the Randolph–Macon College Yellow Jackets. The college football rivalry between the NCAA Division III schools, often known simply as "The Game", dates to 1893 and has been called the oldest small-school rivalry in the Southern United States. The rivalry now crosses all sports, with the men's basketball series in particular gaining national attention.

== Football ==
The college football rivalry between Hampden–Sydney College and Randolph–Macon College dates to 1893. The game was played on Hampden–Sydney's campus, as the previous year President Richard McIlwaine had banned the team from traveling to keep them from "vicious temptations and surroundings"; Randolph–Macon was one of the only teams willing to travel to Hampden–Sydney without potential reciprocation. Randolph–Macon won the game 12–6. Since then, the two teams have met 126 times (no games were played in 1943 and 1944) in what has been called the South's oldest small-school rivalry. Hampden–Sydney's longest streak without losing is 14 games, from 1915 through 1926. Randolph–Macon's longest streak without losing is 12 games, from 2014 to 2025. Hampden–Sydney has won 8 of the top 10 largest point-differential games with the widest margin being by 62 points and the lowest being 32; Randolph–Macon has won by over 30 points twice—in 1997 by 31 and in 2019 by 42. (Note: Hampden–Sydney won 62–0 (62) in 1917; 36–0 (36) in 1962; 36–0 (36) in 1902; 33–0 (33) in 1917; 50–16 (34) in 2004; 50–17 (33) in 2005; 39–6 in 1928 (33); and 53–21 (32) in 2003. Randolph–Macon won 49–18 (31) in 2003.) Since 2011, the Yellow Jackets have won 14 games and the Tigers 1. Randolph–Macon leads the series 60–59–11 with Hampden–Sydney winning the most recent matchup on November 14, 2026, to snap Randolph–Macon's twelve game winning streak.

Known to fans simply as "The Game", it is by far the highest profile matchup on either team's schedule. It is played in November as the final game of each team's regular football season. It often decides the champion of the ODAC. Being only 78 miles from each other and within an hour of Richmond, Virginia, the two NCAA Division III non-scholarship schools overlap in their recruiting pool, heightening the rivalry particularly in Richmond, where thousands of alumni from both colleges reside. The year-round nature of the rivalry has led fans to consider "The Game" the highlight of the schedule.

On November 24, 2020, the 1984 football victory over Hampden Sydney was voted by Randolph Macon alumni and fans as the greatest football game in the history of Randolph Macon dating back to 1891. In this game, Randolph Macon’s defense forced five turnovers which allowed the explosive and record breaking offense to score 31 points in a 31–10 victory. This win allowed Randolph Macon Macon to advance to the NCAA playoffs for the first time in the school’s history finishing the regular season ranked #5 in the nation and #1 in the NCAA South Region. During the historic 1984 season, Randolph Macon wide receiver Keith Gilliam broke the all time NCAA record by having nine consecutive receptions for touchdowns.

=== Game results ===
Hampden–Sydney victories	Randolph–Macon victories	Ties

No.	Date	Location	Winning Team	Score
1	1893	Hampden–Sydney	Randolph–Macon	12–6
2	1896	Hampden–Sydney	Hampden–Sydney	24–0
3	1898	Ashland	Hampden–Sydney	18–0
4	1900	Hampden–Sydney	Hampden–Sydney	11–0
5	1901	Ashland	Hampden–Sydney	22–6
6	1902	Ashland	Hampden–Sydney	36–0
7	1902	Hampden–Sydney	Hampden–Sydney	5–0
8	1903	Ashland	Hampden–Sydney	12–0
9	1906	Hampden–Sydney	Randolph–Macon	6–0
10	1907	Ashland	Hampden–Sydney	11–5
11	1908	Petersburg	Randolph–Macon	5–0
12	1909	Ashland	Randolph–Macon	8–5
13	1910	Hampden–Sydney	Randolph–Macon	10–3
14	1911	Richmond	Randolph–Macon	6–2
15	1912	Ashland	Randolph–Macon	3–0
16	1913	Hampden–Sydney	Hampden–Sydney	13–0
17	1914	Ashland	Randolph–Macon	21–0
18	1914	Hampden–Sydney	Hampden–Sydney	6–0
19	1915	Ashland	Randolph–Macon	26–0
20	1915	Hampden–Sydney	Hampden–Sydney	6–0
21	1916	Ashland	Tie	14–14
22	1916	Richmond	Tie	0–0
23	1917	Boulevard Park	Hampden–Sydney	33–0
24	1917	Petersburg	Hampden–Sydney	62–0
25	1918	Hampden–Sydney	Hampden–Sydney	28–7
26	1919	Mayo Island Park	Hampden–Sydney	19–14
27	1919	Lynchburg	Hampden–Sydney	10–0
28	1920	Ashland	Hampden–Sydney	28–0
29	1921	Mayo Island Park	Hampden–Sydney	21–0
30	1923	Mayo Island Park	Hampden–Sydney	25–6
31	1924	Mayo Island Park	Tie	0–0
32	1925	Mayo Island Park	Hampden–Sydney	26–0
33	1926	Hampden–Sydney	Hampden–Sydney	19–0
34	1927	Petersburg	Randolph–Macon	6–0
35	1928	Hampden–Sydney	Hampden–Sydney	39–6
36	1930	Hampden–Sydney	Randolph–Macon	6–0
37	1931	Ashland	Randolph–Macon	7–0
38	1932	Hampden–Sydney	Tie	0–0
39	1933	Ashland	Randolph–Macon	21–20
40	1934	Hampden–Sydney	Tie	0–0
41	1935	Ashland	Randolph–Macon	14–6
42	1936	Petersburg	Randolph–Macon	21–7
43	1937	Petersburg	Randolph–Macon	3–0
44	1938	Richmond	Randolph–Macon	9–7
45	1939	Ashland	Hampden–Sydney	12–0
46	1940	Lynchburg	Hampden–Sydney	27–7
47	1941	Ashland	Hampden–Sydney	14–0
48	1942	Hampden–Sydney	Tie	6–6
49	1945	Hampden–Sydney	Tie	7–7
50	1946	Hampden–Sydney	Randolph–Macon	6–0
51	1947	Ashland	Randolph–Macon	13–7
52	1948	Hampden–Sydney	Hampden–Sydney	20–6
53	1949	Ashland	Hampden–Sydney	22–15
54	1950	Hampden–Sydney	Randolph–Macon	21–13
55	1951	Ashland	Tie	20–20
56	1952	Richmond	Tie	26–26
57	1953	Ashland	Hampden–Sydney	20–12
58	1954	Hampden–Sydney	Hampden–Sydney	23–0
59	1955	Ashland	Randolph–Macon	7–6
60	1956	Hampden–Sydney	Hampden–Sydney	27–7
61	1957	Ashland	Hampden–Sydney	26–19
62	1958	Hampden–Sydney	Randolph–Macon	23–20
63	1959	Richmond	Tie	0–0
64	1960	Richmond	Randolph–Macon	10–7
65	1961	Ashland	Hampden–Sydney	13–6
66	1962	Hampden–Sydney	Hampden–Sydney	36–0

No.	Date	Location	Winning Team	Score
67	1963	Ashland	Hampden–Sydney	14–7
68	1964	Hampden–Sydney	Hampden–Sydney	20–0
69	1965	Ashland	Randolph–Macon	7–0
70	1966	Hampden–Sydney	Hampden–Sydney	15–14
71	1967	Randolph-Macon	Randolph–Macon	24–14
72	1968	Hampden–Sydney	Randolph–Macon	36–8
73	1969	Randolph-Macon	Randolph–Macon	22–19
74	1970	Hampden-Sydney	Hampden–Sydney	14–6
75	1971	Hampden–Sydney	Hampden–Sydney	17–13
76	1972	Hampden–Sydney	Randolph–Macon	35–10
77	1973	Ashland	Hampden–Sydney	21–0
78	1974	Hampden–Sydney	Randolph–Macon	7–3
79	1975	Ashland	Hampden–Sydney	23–19
80	1976	Hampden–Sydney	Randolph–Macon	28–23
81	1977	Ashland	Hampden–Sydney	35–7
82	1978	Hampden–Sydney	Randolph–Macon	27–14
83	1979	Ashland	Randolph–Macon	9–7
84	1980	Hampden–Sydney	Randolph–Macon	16–15
85	1981	Ashland	Tie	10–10
86	1982	Hampden–Sydney	Hampden–Sydney	6–3
87	1983	Ashland	Hampden–Sydney	24–20
88	1984	Hampden–Sydney	Randolph–Macon	31–10
89	1985	Ashland	Randolph–Macon	12–7
90	1986	Hampden–Sydney	Hampden–Sydney	21–7
91	1987	Ashland	Randolph–Macon	25–18
92	1988	Hampden–Sydney	Randolph–Macon	23–10
93	1989	Ashland	Randolph–Macon	21–14
94	1990	Hampden–Sydney	Hampden–Sydney	28–7
95	1991	Ashland	Hampden–Sydney	29–28
96	1992	Hampden–Sydney	Hampden–Sydney	26–22
97	1993	Ashland	Randolph–Macon	17–10
98	1994	Hampden–Sydney	Hampden–Sydney	24–10
99	1995	Ashland	Randolph–Macon	35–14
100	1996	Hampden–Sydney	Randolph–Macon	20–10
101	1997	Ashland	Randolph–Macon	49–18
102	1998	Hampden–Sydney	Randolph–Macon	45–42
103	1999	Ashland	Randolph–Macon	33–7
104	2000	Hampden–Sydney	Randolph–Macon	26–17
105	2001	Ashland	Hampden–Sydney	38–26
106	2002	Hampden–Sydney	Hampden–Sydney	7–0
107	2003	Ashland	Hampden–Sydney	53–21
108	2004	Hampden–Sydney	Hampden–Sydney	50–16
109	2005	Ashland	Hampden–Sydney	50–17
110	2006	Hampden–Sydney	Hampden–Sydney	46–21
111	2007	Ashland	Hampden–Sydney	31–13
112	2008	Hampden–Sydney	Randolph–Macon	31–21
113	2009	Ashland	Hampden–Sydney	34–27
114	2010	Hampden–Sydney	Hampden–Sydney	31–28
115	2011	Ashland	Randolph–Macon	48–34
116	2012	Hampden–Sydney	Randolph–Macon	41–31
117	2013	Ashland	Hampden–Sydney	28–26
118	2014	Hampden–Sydney	Randolph–Macon	24–10
119	2015	Ashland	Randolph–Macon	14–9
120	2016	Hampden-Sydney	Randolph–Macon	48–23
121	2017	Ashland	Randolph–Macon	56–28
122	2018	Hampden-Sydney	Randolph–Macon	48–35
123	2019	Ashland	Randolph–Macon	45–3
124	2020	Hampden-Sydney	Randolph–Macon	28–0
125	2021	Ashland	Randolph–Macon	37–14
126	2022	Hampden-Sydney	Randolph–Macon	38–17
127	2023	Ashland	Randolph–Macon	49–10
128	2024	Hampden-Sydney	Randolph–Macon	27–6
129	2025	Ashland	Randolph–Macon	42–14
130	2026	Hampden-Sydney	Hampden–Sydney	36–27
Series: Randolph–Macon leads 60–59–11

== Men's basketball ==
While the football matchup has the most history, the rivalry has extended across all sports in which the schools compete, and since the 1990s the men's basketball series has gained national attention. Since that time both schools have been national Division III contenders, with both ranked in the top ten in multiple years. As such, the games often have championship implications for one or both teams. In 2003 the #1 Yellow Jackets beat the #3 Tigers in a game that sold out weeks prior; in 2007 Hampden–Sydney derailed Randolph–Macon's postseason hopes with a playoff victory after being swept in the regular season. Both teams were in the top ten in 2004 when the #8 Yellow Jackets upset the undefeated, first-ranked Tigers. In 2021, #1 ranked Randolph-Macon defeated Hampden-Sydney 79-65, but the return contest was cancelled due to COVID-19. The Yellow Jackets finished the season with a 12-0 record, an ODAC championship, and the #1 ranking in the final D3Hoops.com poll. The following season, Randolph-Macon defeated Hampden-Sydney twice, en route to a perfect 16-0 ODAC record. The Yellow Jackets won the ODAC tournament and the Division III national championship with a 33-1 overall record, the first national title in school history. Since the 2023-2024 season, Hampden-Sydney Basketball has seen extensive growth, winning two of the last three meetings between the rivals, losing by just 2 points. This loss would be their last until the 2024 NCAA Division III tournament, in which they were bested by just 8 points.
