= 2014 NCAA Division III football season =

American college football season

- Regular season: September 5 – November 15, 2014
- Playoffs: November 22 – December 19, 2014
- National championship: Salem Football Stadium; Salem, VA
- Champion: Wisconsin–Whitewater (6)
- Gagliardi Trophy: Kevin Burke, Mount Union (QB)

The 2014 NCAA Division III football season, play of college football in the United States organized by the National Collegiate Athletic Association at the Division III level, was the most recent season of NCAA Division III football. The season began on September 4 and concluded on December 19 with title game of the NCAA Division III Football Championship. Wisconsin–Whitewater won their sixth Division III title with a 43–34 win over Mount Union at Salem Football Stadium in Salem, Virginia. This was the ninth time in ten seasons that Mount Union and Wisconsin–Whitewater met in the title game.

== Conference changes and new programs ==
School	2013 conference	2014 conference
Mississippi College	American Southwest (Division III)	Gulf South (Division II)
George Fox	Program established	Northwest Conference

== Conference standings ==
2014 American Southwest Conference football standings
	Conf.			Overall
Team	W		L	W		L
No. 6 Mary Hardin–Baylor $^	5	–	0	11	–	1
Louisiana College	4	–	1	6	–	4
Hardin–Simmons	3	–	2	6	–	3
East Texas Baptist	1	–	4	4	–	6
Sul Ross	1	–	4	4	–	6
Howard Payne	1	–	4	2	–	8
$ – Conference champion; ^ – NCAA Division III playoff participant; Rankings from D3football.com

2014 Centennial Conference football standings
	Conf.			Overall
Team	W		L	W		L
No. 10 Johns Hopkins $^	9	–	0	11	–	1
No. 23 Muhlenberg ^	8	–	1	9	–	2
Ursinus	6	–	3	7	–	3
Gettysburg	5	–	4	5	–	5
Franklin & Marshall	4	–	5	5	–	5
Juniata	4	–	5	5	–	5
Moravian	4	–	5	5	–	5
Dickinson	3	–	6	3	–	7
Susquehanna	2	–	7	2	–	8
McDaniel	0	–	9	1	–	9
$ – Conference champion; ^ – NCAA Division III playoff participant; Rankings from D3football.com

2014 College Conference of Illinois and Wisconsin football standings
	Conf.			Overall
Team	W		L	W		L
No. 8 Wheaton (IL) $^	7	–	0	11	–	1
No. 15 North Central (IL)	6	–	1	8	–	2
Augustana (IL)	4	–	3	5	–	5
Elmhurst	4	–	3	5	–	5
Illinois Wesleyan	2	–	5	4	–	6
Carthage	2	–	5	3	–	7
North Park	2	–	5	2	–	8
Millikin	1	–	6	3	–	7
$ – Conference champion; ^ – NCAA Division III playoff participant; Rankings from D3football.com

2014 Eastern Collegiate Football Conference standings
	Conf.			Overall
Team	W		L	W		L
Husson $^	7	–	0	8	–	2
Castleton	5	–	2	7	–	3
Norwich	5	–	2	7	–	4
Mount Ida	5	–	2	5	–	5
SUNY Maritime	3	–	4	4	–	6
Gallaudet	2	–	5	2	–	7
Becker	1	–	6	1	–	9
Anna Maria	0	–	7	0	–	10
$ – Conference champion; ^ – NCAA Division III playoff participant

2014 Empire 8 Athletic Conference football standings
	Conf.			Overall
Team	W		L	W		L
No. 21 St. John Fisher +	6	–	2	9	–	2
Ithaca +^	6	–	2	7	–	4
Buffalo State	5	–	3	8	–	3
Salisbury	5	–	3	7	–	4
Utica	5	–	3	7	–	4
Alfred	3	–	5	5	–	5
Brockport	3	–	5	5	–	5
Frostburg State	2	–	6	4	–	6
Hartwick	1	–	7	2	–	8
+ – Conference co-champions; ^ – NCAA Division III playoff participant; Rankings from D3football.com

2014 Heartland Collegiate Athletic Conference football standings
	Conf.			Overall
Team	W		L	W		L
Franklin (IN) $^	8	–	0	8	–	3
Mount St. Joseph	7	–	1	8	–	2
Bluffton	6	–	2	6	–	4
Rose–Hulman	5	–	3	7	–	3
Manchester	3	–	5	4	–	6
Defiance	3	–	5	3	–	7
Anderson (IN)	2	–	6	2	–	8
Hanover	2	–	6	2	–	8
Earlham	0	–	8	0	–	10
$ – Conference champion; ^ – NCAA Division III playoff participant

2014 Iowa Intercollegiate Athletic Conference football standings
	Conf.			Overall
Team	W		L	W		L
No. 4 Wartburg $^	7	–	0	12	–	1
Central (IA)	6	–	1	8	–	2
Buena Vista	4	–	3	5	–	5
Coe	4	–	3	5	–	5
Dubuque	3	–	4	4	–	6
Luther	2	–	5	5	–	5
Loras	2	–	5	3	–	7
Simpson (IA)	0	–	7	3	–	7
$ – Conference champion; ^ – NCAA Division III playoff participant; Rankings from D3football.com

2014 Liberty League football standings
	Conf.			Overall
Team	W		L	W		L
No. 9 Hobart $^	7	–	0	12	–	1
St. Lawrence	6	–	1	8	–	2
RPI	4	–	3	6	–	5
Rochester (NY)	3	–	4	5	–	4
Springfield	3	–	4	5	–	5
WPI	3	–	4	4	–	6
Union (NY)	2	–	5	2	–	8
Merchant Marine	0	–	7	2	–	8
$ – Conference champion; ^ – NCAA Division III playoff participant; Rankings from D3football.com

2014 Massachusetts State Collegiate Athletic Conference football standings
	Conf.			Overall
Team	W		L	W		L
Framingham State $	8	–	0	10	–	1
Western Connecticut	6	–	2	7	–	4
Worcester State	5	–	3	7	–	3
Fitchburg State	4	–	4	6	–	4
Westfield State	4	–	4	5	–	5
Bridgewater State	3	–	5	4	–	6
Massachusetts Maritime	3	–	5	4	–	6
UMass Dartmouth	3	–	5	4	–	6
Plymouth State	0	–	8	1	–	9
$ – Conference champion

2014 Michigan Intercollegiate Athletic Association football standings
	Conf.			Overall
Team	W		L	W		L
Adrian $^	5	–	1	8	–	3
Albion	4	–	2	6	–	4
Trine	4	–	2	6	–	4
Hope	3	–	3	6	–	4
Olivet	3	–	3	6	–	4
Kalamazoo	2	–	4	2	–	8
Alma	0	–	6	2	–	8
$ – Conference champion; ^ – NCAA Division III playoff participant

2014 Middle Atlantic Conference football standings
	Conf.			Overall
Team	W		L	W		L
No. 11 Widener $^	9	–	0	12	–	1
No. 25 Delaware Valley ^	8	–	1	9	–	2
Lycoming	7	–	2	8	–	2
Stevenson	6	–	3	8	–	3
Albright	5	–	4	6	–	5
King's	4	–	5	4	–	6
Lebanon Valley	3	–	6	3	–	7
Wilkes	2	–	7	2	–	8
Misericordia	1	–	8	1	–	9
FDU Florham	0	–	9	0	–	10
$ – Conference champion; ^ – NCAA Division III playoff participant; Rankings from D3football.com

2014 Midwest Conference football standings
	Conf.			Overall
Team	W		L	W		L
North
Macalester xy$^	5	–	0	9	–	2
Carroll (WI)	4	–	1	8	–	2
St. Norbert	3	–	2	6	–	4
Ripon	2	–	3	3	–	7
Lawrence	1	–	4	2	–	8
Beloit	0	–	5	3	–	7
South
Illinois College xy	5	–	0	7	–	3
Monmouth (IL)	4	–	1	8	–	2
Cornell (IA)	3	–	2	5	–	4
Lake Forest	2	–	3	4	–	6
Grinnell	1	–	4	3	–	7
Knox	0	–	5	2	–	8
Championship: Macalester 30, Illinois College 27
$ – Conference champion; x – Division champion/co-champions; y – Championship game participant; ^ – NCAA Division III playoff participant

2014 Minnesota Intercollegiate Athletic Conference football standings
	Conf.			Overall
Team	W		L	W		L
No. 12 Saint John's (MN) $^	7	–	1	10	–	2
Concordia–Moorhead	6	–	2	8	–	2
No. 16 St. Thomas (MN) ^	6	–	2	8	–	3
Bethel (MN)	6	–	2	7	–	3
Gustavus Adolphus	4	–	4	6	–	4
Augsburg	3	–	5	4	–	6
Hamline	2	–	6	4	–	6
Carleton	1	–	7	2	–	8
St. Olaf	1	–	7	1	–	9
$ – Conference champion; ^ – NCAA Division III playoff participant; Rankings from D3football.com

2014 New England Football Conference standings
	Conf.			Overall
Team	W		L	W		L
MIT $^	7	–	0	10	–	1
Western New England	5	–	2	8	–	2
Salve Regina	5	–	2	7	–	4
Endicott	4	–	3	5	–	5
Curry	3	–	4	3	–	7
Maine Maritime	2	–	5	3	–	6
Coast Guard	2	–	5	3	–	7
Nichols	0	–	7	1	–	9
$ – Conference champion; ^ – NCAA Division III playoff participant

2014 New England Small College Athletic Conference football standings
	Conf.			Overall
Team	W		L	W		L
Amherst $	8	–	0	8	–	0
Wesleyan	7	–	1	7	–	1
Middlebury	6	–	2	6	–	2
Trinity (CT)	5	–	3	5	–	3
Bates	4	–	4	4	–	4
Tufts	4	–	4	4	–	4
Bowdoin	2	–	6	2	–	6
Colby	2	–	6	2	–	6
Williams	2	–	6	2	–	6
Hamilton	0	–	8	0	–	8
$ – Conference champion

2014 New Jersey Athletic Conference football standings
	Conf.			Overall
Team	W		L	W		L
Morrisville State +	6	–	1	9	–	2
Montclair State +	6	–	1	8	–	2
Rowan +^	6	–	1	7	–	4
Cortland	4	–	3	5	–	5
William Paterson	2	–	5	4	–	6
Kean	2	–	5	2	–	8
TCNJ	1	–	6	2	–	8
Southern Virginia #	1	–	6	1	–	9
+ – Conference co-champions; ^ – NCAA Division III playoff participant; # – Provisional NCAA Division III member

2014 North Coast Athletic Conference football standings
	Conf.			Overall
Team	W		L	W		L
No. 17 Wittenberg $^	9	–	0	9	–	2
No. 13 Wabash ^	8	–	1	10	–	2
DePauw	6	–	3	7	–	3
Denison	5	–	4	6	–	4
Ohio Wesleyan	5	–	4	6	–	4
Hiram	4	–	5	5	–	5
Wooster	4	–	5	4	–	6
Oberlin	2	–	7	2	–	8
Allegheny	1	–	8	1	–	9
Kenyon	1	–	8	1	–	9
$ – Conference champion; ^ – NCAA Division III playoff participant; Rankings from D3football.com

2014 Northern Athletics Collegiate Conference football standings
	Conf.			Overall
Team	W		L	W		L
Wisconsin Lutheran +	5	–	1	7	–	3
Lakeland +	5	–	1	6	–	4
Benedictine (IL) +^	5	–	1	6	–	5
Concordia (WI)	3	–	3	5	–	5
Rockford	1	–	5	2	–	8
Concordia (IL)	1	–	5	1	–	8
Aurora	1	–	5	1	–	9
+ – Conference co-champions; ^ – NCAA Division III playoff participant

2014 Northwest Conference football standings
	Conf.			Overall
Team	W		L	W		L
No. 3 Linfield +^	6	–	1	11	–	2
Pacific (OR) +	6	–	1	6	–	3
Pacific Lutheran	5	–	2	7	–	2
Whitworth	4	–	3	6	–	4
Willamette	3	–	4	5	–	4
Puget Sound	3	–	4	4	–	5
George Fox	1	–	6	1	–	8
Lewis & Clark	0	–	7	0	–	9
+ – Conference co-champions; ^ – NCAA Division III playoff participant; Rankings from D3football.com

2014 Ohio Athletic Conference football standings
	Conf.			Overall
Team	W		L	W		L
No. 2 Mount Union $^	9	–	0	14	–	1
No. 5 John Carroll ^	8	–	1	11	–	2
Heidelberg	7	–	2	8	–	2
Ohio Northern	6	–	3	7	–	3
Otterbein	5	–	4	5	–	5
Baldwin Wallace	4	–	5	5	–	5
Muskingum	3	–	6	3	–	7
Capital	2	–	7	3	–	7
Marietta	1	–	8	2	–	8
Wilmington (OH)	0	–	9	0	–	10
$ – Conference champion; ^ – NCAA Division III playoff participant; Rankings from D3football.com

2014 Old Dominion Athletic Conference football standings
	Conf.			Overall
Team	W		L	W		L
Bridgewater +	5	–	2	8	–	2
Emory & Henry +	5	–	2	8	–	2
Guilford +	5	–	2	8	–	2
Hampden–Sydney +^	5	–	2	7	–	4
Randolph–Macon	3	–	4	5	–	5
Shenandoah	2	–	5	4	–	6
Washington and Lee	2	–	5	2	–	8
Catholic University	1	–	6	3	–	7
+ – Conference co-champions; ^ – NCAA Division III playoff participant

2014 Presidents' Athletic Conference football standings
	Conf.			Overall
Team	W		L	W		L
No. 14 Washington & Jefferson +^	7	–	1	10	–	2
Thomas More +	7	–	1	8	–	2
Waynesburg	6	–	2	8	–	3
Bethany (WV)	5	–	3	6	–	5
Saint Vincent	4	–	4	4	–	6
Westminster (PA)	4	–	4	4	–	6
Carnegie Mellon	3	–	5	4	–	6
Thiel	3	–	5	4	–	6
Case Western Reserve	3	–	5	3	–	7
Geneva	2	–	6	3	–	7
Grove City	0	–	8	0	–	10
+ – Conference co-champions; ^ – NCAA Division III playoff participant; Rankings from D3football.com

2014 Southern Athletic Association football standings
	Conf.			Overall
Team	W		L	W		L
No. 22 Centre $^	6	–	0	10	–	1
Rhodes	5	–	1	8	–	2
Hendrix	3	–	3	6	–	4
Birmingham–Southern	3	–	3	3	–	7
Millsaps	2	–	4	3	–	6
Berry	1	–	5	2	–	8
Sewanee	1	–	5	2	–	8
$ – Conference champion; ^ – NCAA Division III playoff participant; Rankings from D3football.com

2014 Southern California Intercollegiate Athletic Conference football standings
	Conf.			Overall
Team	W		L	W		L
No. 18 Chapman $^	7	–	0	8	–	2
Redlands	6	–	1	6	–	3
Claremont–Mudd–Scripps	4	–	3	5	–	4
Occidental	4	–	3	5	–	4
Cal Lutheran	4	–	3	4	–	5
La Verne	1	–	6	2	–	7
Whittier	1	–	6	2	–	7
Pomona–Pitzer	1	–	6	1	–	8
$ – Conference champion; ^ – NCAA Division III playoff participant; Rankings from D3football.com

2014 Southern Collegiate Athletic Conference football standings
	Conf.			Overall
Team	W		L	W		L
No. 19 Texas Lutheran $^	3	–	0	9	–	2
Trinity (TX)	2	–	1	4	–	6
Austin	1	–	2	5	–	5
Southwestern (TX)	0	–	3	1	–	8
$ – Conference champion; ^ – NCAA Division III playoff participant; Rankings from D3football.com

2014 Upper Midwest Athletic Conference football standings
	Conf.			Overall
Team	W		L	W		L
St. Scholastica $^	9	–	0	10	–	1
Northwestern (MN)	7	–	2	8	–	2
Greenville	7	–	2	7	–	3
Iowa Wesleyan #	6	–	3	6	–	4
Westminster (MO)	6	–	3	6	–	4
Crown	4	–	5	4	–	6
MacMurray	3	–	6	3	–	7
Eureka	2	–	7	2	–	8
Martin Luther	1	–	8	2	–	8
Minnesota–Morris	0	–	9	0	–	10
$ – Conference champion; ^ – NCAA Division III playoff participant; # – Provisional NCAA Division III member

2014 USA South Athletic Conference football standings
	Conf.			Overall
Team	W		L	W		L
No. 24 Christopher Newport $^	7	–	1	8	–	4
Huntingdon	6	–	2	7	–	3
Maryville (TN)	6	–	2	7	–	3
Methodist	5	–	3	6	–	4
North Carolina Wesleyan	4	–	4	5	–	5
LaGrange	3	–	5	5	–	5
Greensboro	3	–	5	3	–	7
Averett	1	–	7	2	–	8
Ferrum	1	–	7	1	–	9
$ – Conference champion; ^ – NCAA Division III playoff participant; Rankings from D3football.com

2014 Wisconsin Intercollegiate Athletic Conference football standings
	Conf.			Overall
Team	W		L	W		L
No. 1 Wisconsin–Whitewater $^	7	–	0	15	–	0
No. 20 Wisconsin–Oshkosh	6	–	1	6	–	4
Wisconsin–Platteville	5	–	2	7	–	3
Wisconsin–Stevens Point	4	–	3	7	–	3
Wisconsin–La Crosse	2	–	5	3	–	7
Wisconsin–River Falls	2	–	5	3	–	7
Wisconsin–Stout	1	–	6	2	–	8
Wisconsin–Eau Claire	1	–	6	1	–	9
$ – Conference champion; ^ – NCAA Division III playoff participant; Rankings from D3football.com

2014 NCAA Division III independents football records
	Conf.			Overall
Team	W		L	W		L
Chicago		–		8	–	1
No. 7 Wesley ^		–		12	–	2
Washington University		–		4	–	6
Alfred State #		–		1	–	7
Maranatha Baptist		–		0	–	6
^ – NCAA Division III playoff participant; # – Provisional Division III member; Rankings from D3football.com

== Conference summaries ==
Conference champions
- American Southwest Conference – Mary Hardin–Baylor (9–0, 4–0)
- Centennial Conference – Johns Hopkins (9–0, 8–0)
- College Conference of Illinois and Wisconsin – Wheaton (IL) (9–0, 6–0)
- Eastern Collegiate Football Conference – Husson (8–2, 7–0)
- Empire 8 Conference – Ithaca (7–2, 6–2)
- Heartland Collegiate Athletic Conference – Franklin (7–0, 7–2)
- Iowa Intercollegiate Athletic Conference – Wartburg (9–0, 6–0)
- Liberty League – Hobart (9–0, 6–0)
- Massachusetts State Collegiate Athletic Conference – Framingham State (10–1, 8–0)
- Michigan Intercollegiate Athletic Association – Adrian (8–3, 5–1)
- Middle Atlantic Conference – Widener (12–0, 9–0)
- Midwest Conference – Macalester (9–2, 5–0)
- Minnesota Intercollegiate Athletic Conference – Saint John's (MN) (10–2, 7–1)
- New England Football Conference – MIT (8–3, 7–0)
- New England Small College Athletic Conference – Amherst (8–0, 8–0)
- New Jersey Athletic Conference – Morrisville State (9–2, 6–1), Montclair State (8–2, 6–1), and Rowan (7–4, 6–1)
- North Coast Athletic Conference – Wittenberg (8–1, 8–0)
- Northern Athletics Collegiate Conference – Wisconsin Lutheran (7–3, 5–1)
- Northwest Conference – Linfield (10–1, 6–1)
- Ohio Athletic Conference – Mount Union (12–0, 9–0)
- Old Dominion Athletic Conference – Hampden–Sydney (7–4, 5–2)
- Presidents' Athletic Conference – Thomas More (8–2, 7–1) and Washington & Jefferson (9–1, 7–1)
- Southern Athletic Association – Centre (10–1, 6–0)
- Southern California Intercollegiate Athletic Conference – Chapman (7–1, 6–0)
- Southern Collegiate Athletic Conference – Texas Lutheran (8–1, 2–0)
- University Athletic Association – Chicago (8–1, 3–0)
- Upper Midwest Athletic Conference – St. Scholastica (10–0, 9–0)
- United States South Athletic Conference – Christopher Newport (8–2, 6–1)
- Wisconsin Intercollegiate Athletic Conference – Wisconsin–Whitewater (9–0, 6–0)

== Headlines ==
- October 18
  - Lance Leipold, head coach at Wisconsin–Whitewater, sets an all-divisions NCAA record for the fewest games required to reach 100 career wins, doing so in his 106th career game, a 52–3 blowout of Wisconsin–Eau Claire. The previous record was set by Hall of Fame coach Gil Dobie, who reached the 100-win mark in his 108th game at Cornell in 1921.

== Postseason ==
Twenty-four conferences met the requirements for an automatic ("Pool A") bid to the playoffs. Besides the NESCAC, which does not participate in the playoffs, three conferences had no Pool A bid. The MASCAC and SAA were in the second year of the two-year waiting period; the SCAC had only four members, three short of the requirement. The American Southwest, which had fallen below seven members in 2013, was in the second year of the two-year grace period.

Schools not in Pool A conferences were eligible for Pool B. The number of Pool B bids was determined by calculating the ratio of Pool A conferences to schools in those conferences and applying that ratio to the number of Pool B schools. The 24 Pool A conferences contained 207 schools, an average of 8.6 teams per conference. Twenty-four schools were in Pool B, enough for two bids.

The remaining six playoff spots were at-large ("Pool C") teams.

=== Playoff bracket ===
First Round; November 22; Campus Sites
Wisconsin–Whitewater*	55
Macalester	2
Wabash*	33
Franklin	14
Saint John's (MN)*	35
St. Scholastica	7
Wartburg*	37
St. Thomas (MN)	31
Widener*	36
Muhlenberg	35
Delaware Valley*	26
Christopher Newport	29
Linfield*	55
Chapman	24
Mary Hardin–Baylor*	27
Texas Lutheran	20
Wesley*	52
Hampden–Sydney	7
Husson*	20
MIT	27*
Johns Hopkins*	24
Rowan	16
Hobart*	22
Ithaca	15
Wheaton (IL)*	43
Benedictine (IL)	14
John Carroll*	63
Centre	28
Wittenberg*	25
Washington & Jefferson	41
Mount Union*	63
Adrian	3

Second Round; November 29; Campus Sites
Wisconsin–Whitewater*	38
Wabash	14
St. John's (MN)	10
Wartburg*	21
Widener*	37
Christopher Newport	27
Linfield	31
Mary Hardin–Baylor*	28
Wesley*	59
MIT	0
Johns Hopkins	21
Hobart*	24
Wheaton (IL)*	12
John Carroll	14
Washington & Jefferson	0
Mount Union*	67

Quarterfinals; December 6 Campus Sites
Wisconsin–Whitewater*	37
Wartburg	33
Widener*	7
Linfield	45
Wesley*	41
Hobart	13
John Carroll	28
Mount Union*	36

Semifinals; December 13; Campus Sites
Wisconsin–Whitewater*	20
Linfield	14
Wesley	21
Mount Union*	70

National Championship Game; December 19
Wisconsin-Whitewater	43
Mount Union	34

* Home team † Overtime Winner

== See also ==
- 2014 NCAA Division I FBS football season
- 2014 NCAA Division I FCS football season
- 2014 NCAA Division II football season
