= Hampden–Sydney Tigers =

Collegiate sports club in the United States

- University: Hampden–Sydney College
- Conference: Old Dominion Athletic Conference
- NCAA: Division III
- Athletic director: Chad Eisele
- Location: Hampden Sydney, Virginia
- Varsity teams: 9
- Football stadium: Lewis C. Everett Stadium
- Basketball arena: Kirby Fieldhouse
- Baseball stadium: Ty Cobb Ballpark
- Soccer stadium: Miller Field
- Nickname: Tigers
- Colors: Garnet and gray
- Website: hscathletics.com
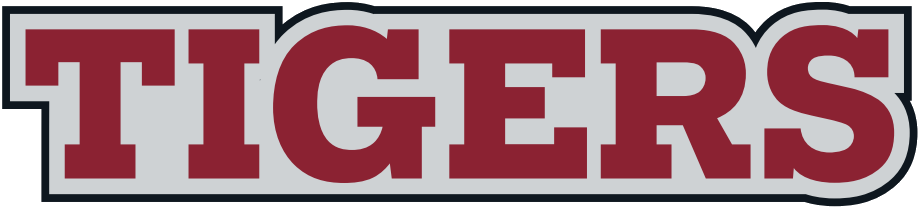

The Hampden–Sydney Tigers are the athletic teams that represent Hampden–Sydney College, located in Hampden Sydney, Virginia, in NCAA Division III intercollegiate sports. The Tigers compete as members of the Old Dominion Athletic Conference for all sports. The Tigers were one of the founding members of the ODAC in 1976. Hampden–Sydney sponsors 9 sporting activities for its male students.

== History ==
Hampden–Sydney's rivalry with Randolph–Macon College is one of the longest-running college rivalries in the United States. "The Game" is often referred to as the oldest small-school football rivalry in the South, with the first match up having been played in 1893. Athletic events involving the two schools are fiercely competitive, and the week prior to "The Game" between Hampden–Sydney and Randolph-Macon is known as "Beat Macon Week".

== Varsity teams ==
Sports
Baseball	Basketball
Cross country	Football
Golf	Lacrosse
Rugby (Note: Club sport.)	Soccer
Swimming	Tennis
Track and field	

=== Football ===
The first football team representing Hampden–Sydney in 1892

The Hampden–Sydney football team compete in the National Collegiate Athletic Association's (NCAA) Division III, representing Hampden–Sydney College in the Old Dominion Athletic Conference. Hampden–Sydney has played their home games at Everett Stadium in Hampden–Sydney, Virginia since 2007, replacing the 40-year-old Hundley Stadium. Hampden–Sydney's playing surface, originally named Venable Field, was built on a former frog pond dredged by students in 1896. In 1915, according to tradition, the field was nicknamed "Death Valley" by a defeated Richmond College player because Hampden–Sydney so frequently trounced opposing teams at home.

Football was introduced to the college by William Ford "Billy" Bull in 1892 after he matriculated as a freshman. Bull was also the captain of the squad for the team's first match up against Randolph–Macon College in 1893, a bitter rivalry known as The Game – the oldest small-school rivalry in the South – which has been contested 119 times. Bull led the Tigers to a record of one win and two losses over his three seasons as head coach, earning the College's first victory in 1894 with a 28–0 win over William & Mary.

== Facilities ==
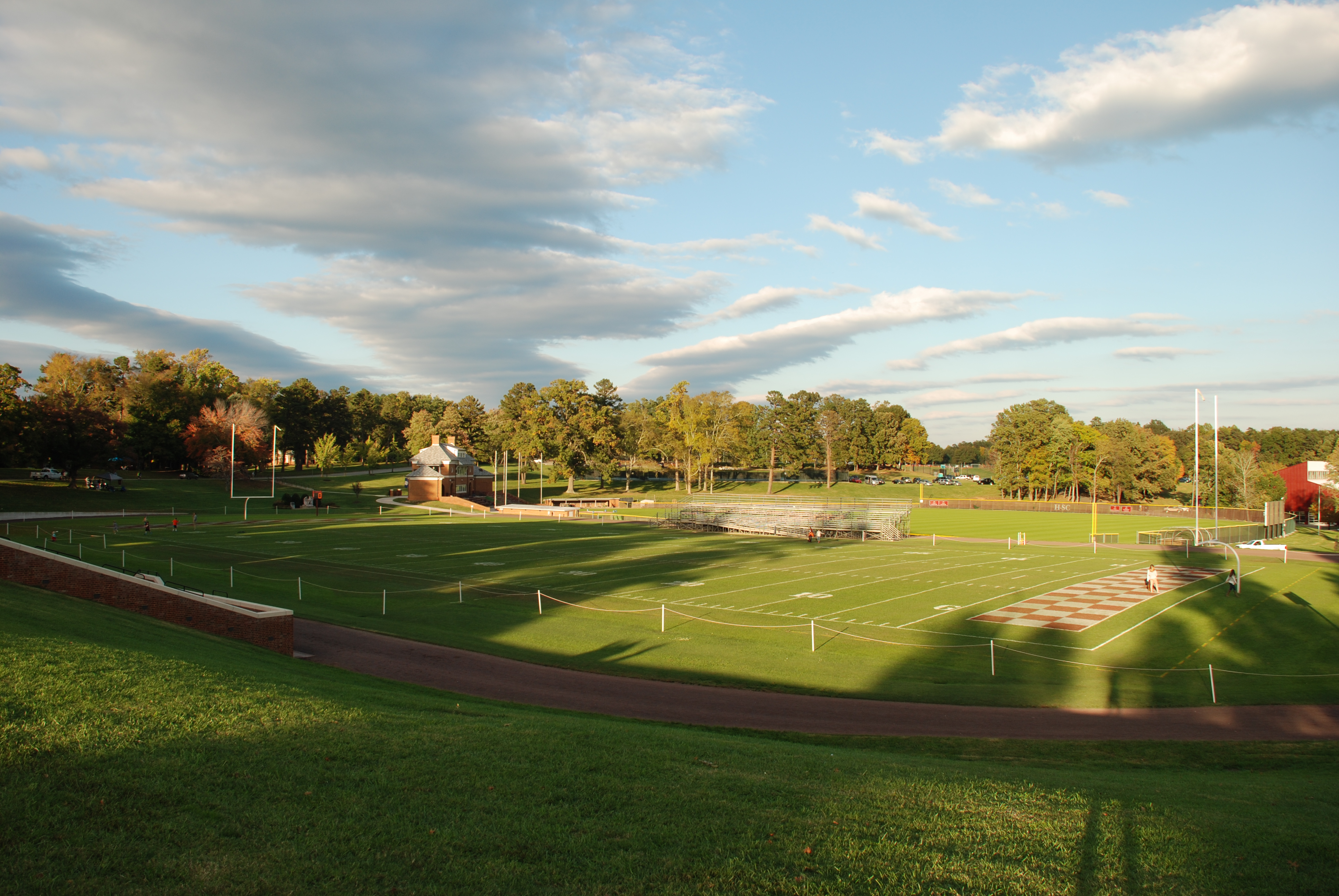
Lewis Everett stadium, home to the football team

Venue	Sport(s)	Ref.
Lewis C. Everett Stadium	Football	
Ty Cobb Ballpark	Baseball	
Kirby Field House	Basketball	
Hellmuth-Gibson Field	Soccer; Lacrosse	
Harold Leggett Pool	Swimming	
H-SC Courts	Tennis	
John Ellis Pitch	Rugby	

== Notable athletes ==
- Ryan Odom, head coach of Virginia Cavaliers men's basketball
- Russell Turner, head coach of UC Irvine Anteaters men's basketball
