= Little Three =

New England agglomeration of colleges

Locations of Amherst, Wesleyan, and Williams

Little Three is a term started by and used in reference to athletic competition between three private liberal arts colleges in the New England region of the United States: Amherst College in Amherst, Massachusetts; Wesleyan University in Middletown, Connecticut; and Williams College in Williamstown, Massachusetts.

The exact origin of the term Little Three is lost to history, but was used by the three colleges in an allusion to the Big Three, coined in the 1880s to describe the three big universities—Harvard, Princeton, and Yale—which dominated football in the Ivy League.

The earliest known reference appeared in John Hallahan's Football in New England Colleges in 1923: "Williams College again won the championship of the Little Three, which includes Wesleyan and Amherst . . ." Little Three championships are contested in 24 sports throughout the academic year. Before forming the current Little Three, Amherst, Dartmouth, and Williams were part of the New England Intercollegiate Triangular League, founded in 1882. This league lasted until 1899 when Dartmouth withdrew, paving the way for Wesleyan to join Amherst and Williams in forming the Triangular League. They first joined as the Triangular League athletic conference in 1899, which lasted only three years before breaking up over an argument concerning the eligibility of college baseball players who received pay during summer league play. In 1910, they formed what is believed to be "America’s oldest, continuous intercollegiate athletic conference without a membership change," which earned another moniker, The Triumvirate.

== See also ==
- The Biggest Little Game in America
- Colby-Bates-Bowdoin Consortium
- New England Small College Athletic Conference
