= The Biggest Little Game in America =

American college football rivalry

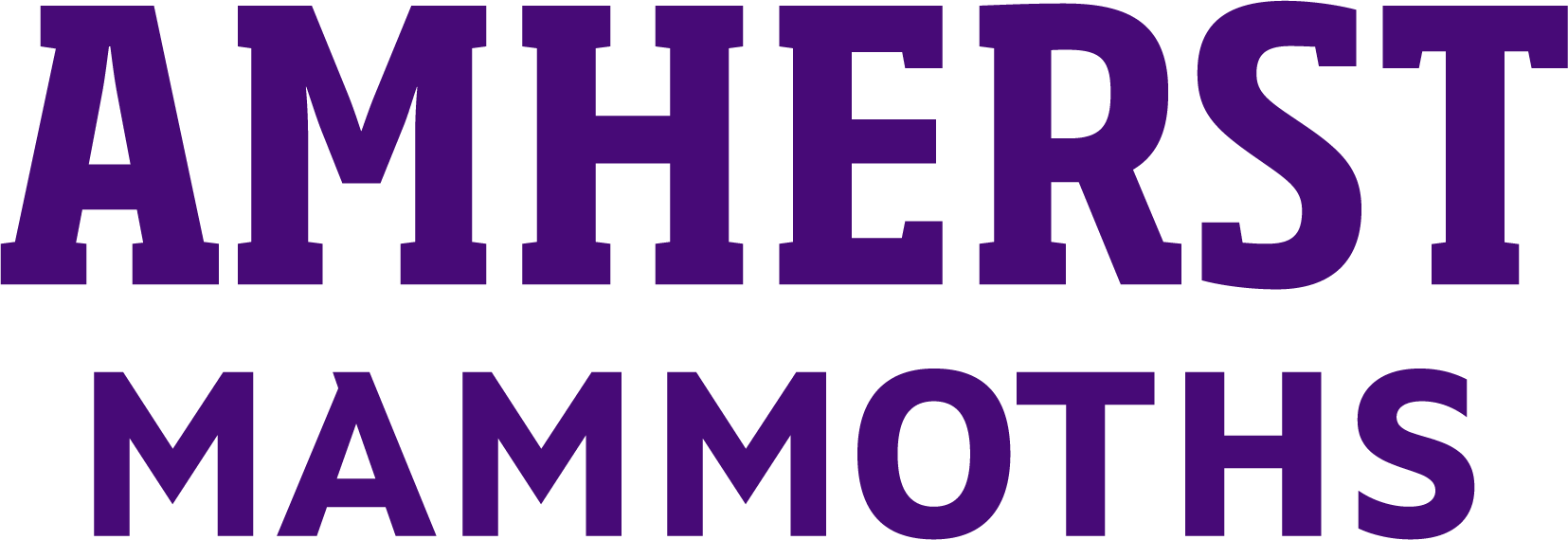
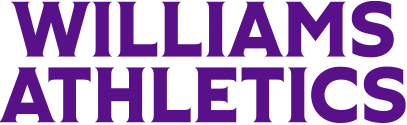
- Amherst Mammoths Williams Ephs
- Sport: Football
- First meeting: November 1, 1884; Williams, 15–2
- Latest meeting: November 14, 2026; Amherst, 16–7
- Next meeting: November 13, 2027

Statistics
- Total meetings: 140
- All-time series: Williams leads, 76–59–5
- Largest victory: Amherst, 60–0 (1892)
- Longest win streak: Williams, 8 (1987–1994)
- Longest unbeaten streak: Williams, 13 (1987–1999)
- Current win streak: Amherst, 2 (2025–present)
- Locations in Massachusetts

The Biggest Little Game in America is an American college football rivalry featuring the Amherst Mammoths and the Williams Ephs. Both programs play in the Division III New England Small College Athletic Conference. Except for a few hiatuses, the series has been played annually since 1884, making it the most-played Division III rivalry game, and the fourth-most played NCAA game at any level. Williams leads the all-time series 76–59–5.

== History ==
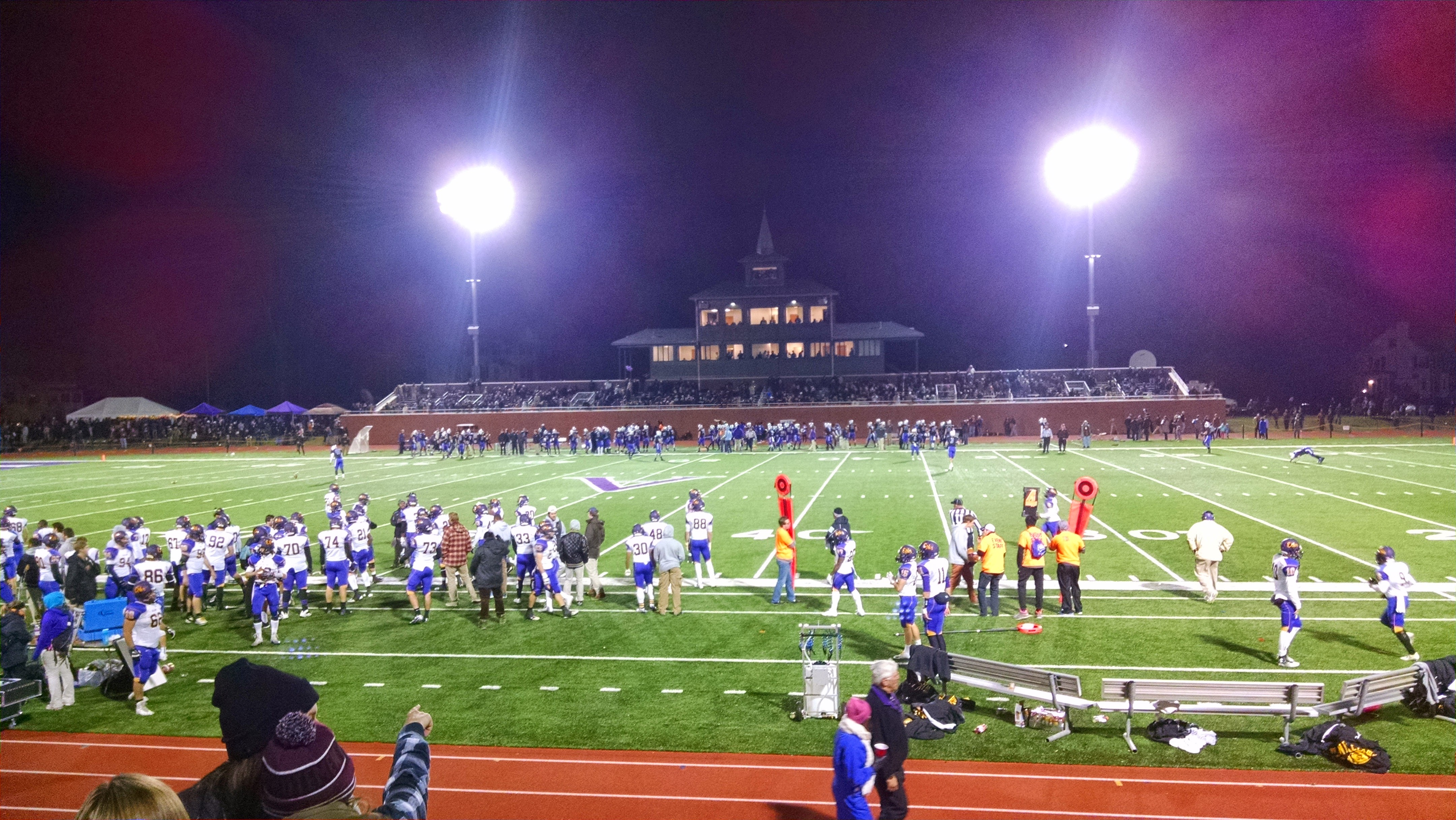
The 2014 game at Amherst's Pratt Field.

The rivalry between Amherst College and Williams College predates the advent of American football, having its roots in the early 19th century with the establishment of Amherst College in 1821. The rivalry was started by the actions of Zephaniah Swift Moore, who served as the president of Williams College at the time. Moore's persistent belief that Williamstown, the location of Williams College, was too remote led to the inception of this competition. Failing to orchestrate the relocation of Williams College, President Moore opted to embark on the formation of a new educational institution in Amherst. In doing so, a faction of professors and students from Williams College joined him in this endeavor, subsequently leading to the establishment of Amherst College. This turn of events created a long-standing rivalry between the two institutions, which has persisted to this day.

This rivalry extends beyond football, and tensions between Amherst College and Williams College have consistently remained high over the years. To further emphasize the significance of this competition, both institutions, in conjunction with Wesleyan University, partake in the "Little Three" series. This series serves as a deliberate nod to the more renowned "Big Three" grouping that traditionally comprises Harvard, Yale, and Princeton.

Notably, the November 10, 2007, contest between Amherst College and Williams College, hosted in Williamstown, achieved recognition as the selected location for ESPN's College GameDay. This particular event holds historical significance as the first instance in which the program visited and highlighted a Division III school. Moreover, in 2003, the Amherst–Williams rivalry earned its place of distinction when it was included in ESPN's Page 2 bracket, celebrating the best college football rivalries.

On November 11, 2017, another memorable chapter was added to the rivalry's annals, as Williams College defeated Amherst in a game held in Williamstown. The victory was secured in overtime culminating in a score of 31–24. This overtime outcome marked only the second occurrence of overtime play in the rivalry.

The first intercollegiate baseball game was played between Amherst and Williams in 1859. In that game, which lasted nearly four hours, Amherst defeated Williams by the score of 73–32.

== Game results ==
Amherst victories	Williams victories	Tie games

No.	Date	Location	Winner	Score
1	November 1, 1884	Williamstown, MA	Williams	15–2
2	November 15, 1884	Amherst, MA	Williams	11–0
3	October 31, 1885	Williamstown, MA	Williams	53–0
4	November 18, 1885	Amherst, MA	Williams	18–15
5	October 30, 1886	Amherst, MA	Amherst	6–4
6	November 20, 1886	Williamstown, MA	Williams	30–0
7	October 8, 1887	Amherst, MA	Williams	54–0
8	November 7, 1888	Amherst, MA	Williams	53–0
9	October 5, 1889	Amherst, MA	Tie	10–10
10	November 15, 1890	Williamstown, MA	Williams	6–0
11	November 20, 1891	Amherst, MA	Tie	0–0
12	November 18, 1892	Williamstown, MA	Amherst	60–0
13	November 18, 1893	Amherst, MA	Williams	30–12
14	November 17, 1894	Williamstown, MA	Williams	34–10
15	November 2, 1895	Amherst, MA	Amherst	16–4
16	November 7, 1896	Williamstown, MA	Amherst	6–4
17	November 6, 1897	Amherst, MA	Tie	6–6
18	November 19, 1898	Williamstown, MA	Amherst	16–5
19	November 11, 1899	Williamstown, MA	Williams	38–0
20	November 10, 1900	Amherst, MA	Williams	16–5
21	November 16, 1901	Williamstown, MA	Williams	21–5
22	October 26, 1904	Williamstown, MA	Amherst	22–6
23	November 18, 1905	Williamstown, MA	Amherst	17–0
24	November 17, 1906	Amherst, MA	Tie	0–0
25	November 16, 1907	Williamstown, MA	Williams	26–6
26	November 21, 1908	Amherst, MA	Amherst	4–0
27	November 13, 1909	Williamstown, MA	Williams	17–0
28	November 12, 1910	Amherst, MA	Amherst	9–0
29	November 18, 1911	Williamstown, MA	Williams	8–0
30	November 16, 1912	Amherst, MA	Williams	19–0
31	November 15, 1913	Williamstown, MA	Amherst	12–0
32	November 14, 1914	Amherst, MA	Williams	14–6
33	November 13, 1915	Williamstown, MA	Amherst	31–0
34	November 18, 1916	Amherst, MA	Williams	26–0
35	November 17, 1917	Williamstown, MA	Williams	20–0
36	November 16, 1918	Amherst, MA	Amherst	20–0
37	November 15, 1919	Williamstown, MA	Williams	30–0
38	November 20, 1920	Amherst, MA	Amherst	14–7
39	November 12, 1921	Williamstown, MA	Williams	20–0
40	November 18, 1922	Amherst, MA	Williams	27–0
41	November 17, 1923	Williamstown, MA	Williams	23–7
42	November 15, 1924	Amherst, MA	Williams	27–6
43	November 14, 1925	Williamstown, MA	Amherst	13–7
44	November 13, 1926	Amherst, MA	Amherst	20–6
45	November 12, 1927	Williamstown, MA	Amherst	7–6
46	November 17, 1928	Amherst, MA	Williams	40–15
47	November 16, 1929	Williamstown, MA	Williams	19–0
48	November 15, 1930	Amherst, MA	Williams	16–13
49	November 14, 1931	Williamstown, MA	Williams	33–7
50	November 12, 1932	Amherst, MA	Amherst	31–7
51	November 18, 1933	Williamstown, MA	Williams	14–0
52	November 17, 1934	Amherst, MA	Amherst	19–7
53	November 16, 1935	Williamstown, MA	Williams	13–0
54	November 14, 1936	Amherst, MA	Amherst	14–13
55	November 13, 1937	Williamstown, MA	Amherst	13–6
56	November 12, 1938	Amherst, MA	Amherst	41–0
57	November 18, 1939	Williamstown, MA	Williams	16–8
58	November 16, 1940	Amherst, MA	Williams	19–6
59	November 15, 1941	Williamstown, MA	Williams	28–6
60	November 14, 1942	Amherst, MA	Amherst	12–6
61	November 16, 1946	Amherst, MA	Williams	84–0
62	November 15, 1947	Williamstown, MA	Amherst	14–6
63	November 13, 1948	Amherst, MA	Amherst	13–7
64	November 12, 1949	Williamstown, MA	Williams	19–13
65	November 18, 1950	Amherst, MA	Williams	27–13
66	November 17, 1951	Williamstown, MA	Williams	40–7
67	November 15, 1952	Amherst, MA	Amherst	21–19
68	November 14, 1953	Williamstown, MA	Amherst	28–14
69	November 13, 1954	Amherst, MA	Amherst	21–14
70	November 12, 1955	Williamstown, MA	Amherst	13–6
71	November 17, 1956	Amherst, MA	Williams	27–12

No.	Date	Location	Winner	Score
72	November 16, 1957	Williamstown, MA	Williams	39–14
73	November 15, 1958	Amherst, MA	Williams	12–7
74	November 14, 1959	Williamstown, MA	Amherst	13–0
75	November 12, 1960	Amherst, MA	Amherst	21–6
76	November 18, 1961	Williamstown, MA	Williams	12–0
77	November 17, 1962	Amherst, MA	Amherst	7–0
78	November 16, 1963	Williamstown, MA	Amherst	19–13
79	November 14, 1964	Amherst, MA	Amherst	20–7
80	November 13, 1965	Williamstown, MA	Amherst	42–8
81	November 12, 1966	Amherst, MA	Amherst	54–21
82	November 18, 1967	Williamstown, MA	Williams	14–10
83	November 16, 1968	Amherst, MA	Amherst	24–17
84	November 15, 1969	Williamstown, MA	Amherst	56–25
85	November 14, 1970	Amherst, MA	Amherst	35–7
86	November 13, 1971	Williamstown, MA	Williams	31–14
87	November 18, 1972	Amherst, MA	Williams	21–12
88	November 17, 1973	Williamstown, MA	Williams	30–14
89	November 16, 1974	Amherst, MA	Williams	17–14
90	November 15, 1975	Williamstown, MA	Williams	25–6
91	November 13, 1976	Amherst, MA	Amherst	16–0
92	November 12, 1977	Williamstown, MA	Williams	21–13
93	November 11, 1978	Amherst, MA	Williams	7–2
94	November 10, 1979	Williamstown, MA	Williams	19–13
95	November 8, 1980	Amherst, MA	Williams	10–3
96	November 14, 1981	Williamstown, MA	Amherst	21–17
97	November 13, 1982	Amherst, MA	Amherst	52–26
98	November 12, 1983	Williamstown, MA	Amherst	14–13
99	November 10, 1984	Amherst, MA	Amherst	23–6
100	November 9, 1985	Williamstown, MA	Amherst	35–20
101	November 8, 1986	Amherst, MA	Amherst	10–7
102	November 14, 1987	Williamstown, MA	Williams	25–7
103	November 12, 1988	Amherst, MA	Williams	21–0
104	November 11, 1989	Williamstown, MA	Williams	17–14
105	November 10, 1990	Amherst, MA	Williams	46–18
106	November 9, 1991	Williamstown, MA	Williams	37–0
107	November 14, 1992	Amherst, MA	Williams	41–6
108	November 13, 1993	Williamstown, MA	Williams	31–2
109	November 12, 1994	Amherst, MA	Williams	48–14
110	November 11, 1995	Williamstown, MA	Tie	0–0
111	November 9, 1996	Amherst, MA	Williams	19–13
112	November 8, 1997	Williamstown, MA	Williams	48–46
113	November 14, 1998	Amherst, MA	Williams	35–16
114	November 13, 1999	Williamstown, MA	Williams	10–7
115	November 11, 2000	Amherst, MA	Amherst	20–12
116	November 10, 2001	Williamstown, MA	Williams	23–20
117	November 9, 2002	Amherst, MA	Amherst	45–35
118	November 8, 2003	Williamstown, MA	Williams	14–10
119	November 13, 2004	Amherst, MA	Amherst	13–10
120	November 12, 2005	Williamstown, MA	Williams	34–23
121	November 11, 2006	Amherst, MA	Williams	37–7
122	November 10, 2007	Williamstown, MA	Williams	20–0
123	November 8, 2008	Amherst, MA	Williams	24–23
124	November 14, 2009	Williamstown, MA	Amherst	26–21
125	November 13, 2010	Amherst, MA	Williams	31–16
126	November 12, 2011	Williamstown, MA	Amherst	31–18
127	November 10, 2012	Amherst, MA	Amherst	23–20
128	November 9, 2013	Williamstown, MA	Amherst	20–7
129	November 8, 2014	Amherst, MA	Amherst	17–9
130	November 14, 2015	Williamstown, MA	Amherst	17–7
131	November 12, 2016	Amherst, MA	Amherst	28–3
132	November 11, 2017	Williamstown, MA	Williams	31–24^{OT}
133	November 10, 2018	Amherst, MA	Amherst	45–14
134	November 9, 2019	Williamstown, MA	Williams	31–9
135	November 13, 2021	Amherst, MA	Williams	24–19
136	November 12, 2022	Williamstown, MA	Williams	20–10
137	November 11, 2023	Amherst, MA	Amherst	21–14
138	November 9, 2024	Williamstown, MA	Williams	21–0
139	November 8, 2025	Amherst. MA	Amherst	14–13
140	November 14, 2026	Williamstown, MA	Amherst	16–7
Series: Williams leads 76–59–5

== See also ==
- List of NCAA college football rivalry games
