= Amherst Mammoths football =

Football team of Amherst College

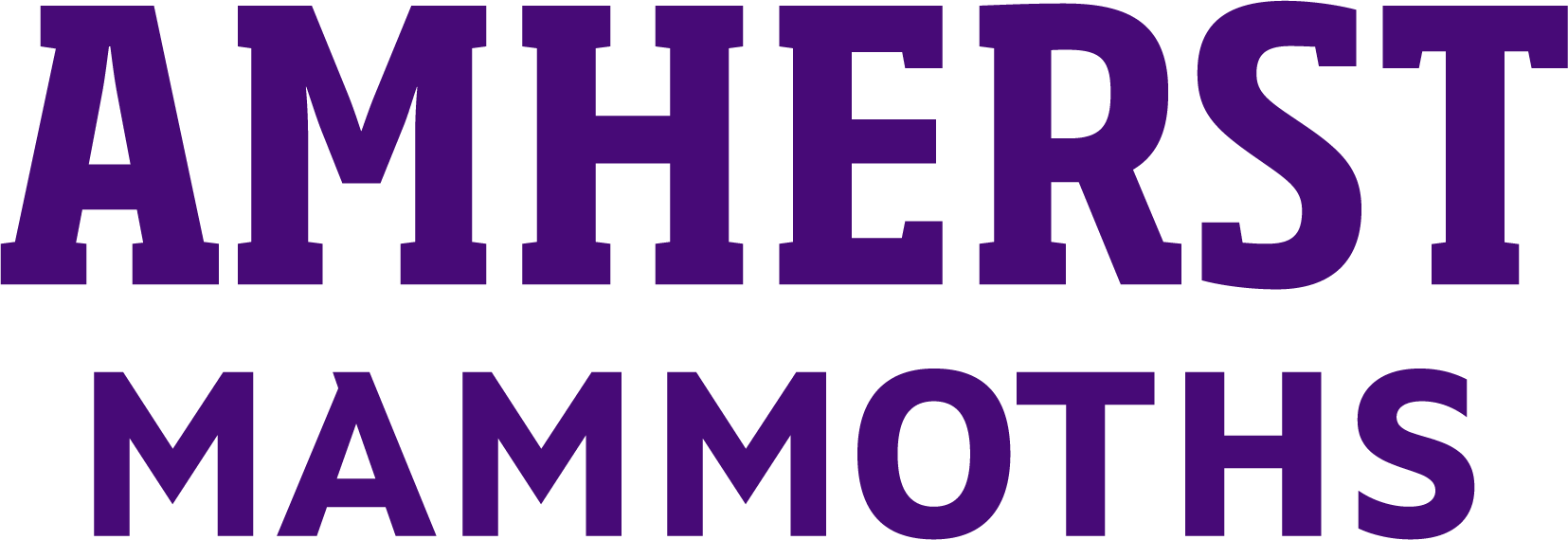
- First season: 1877; 149 years ago
- Athletic director: Don Faulstick
- Head coach: E. J. Mills; 28th season, 153–70 (.686)
- Location: Amherst, Massachusetts
- Stadium: Pratt Field (capacity: 2,500)
- NCAA division: Division III
- Conference: NESCAC
- Colors: Purple and white
- Rivalries: Williams (rivalry)
- Website: athletics.amherst.edu

The Amherst Mammoths represent Amherst College of Amherst, Massachusetts in the sport of college football. The football team is coached by E. J. Mills. Amherst is one of the "Little Three" along with Williams and Wesleyan.

== History ==
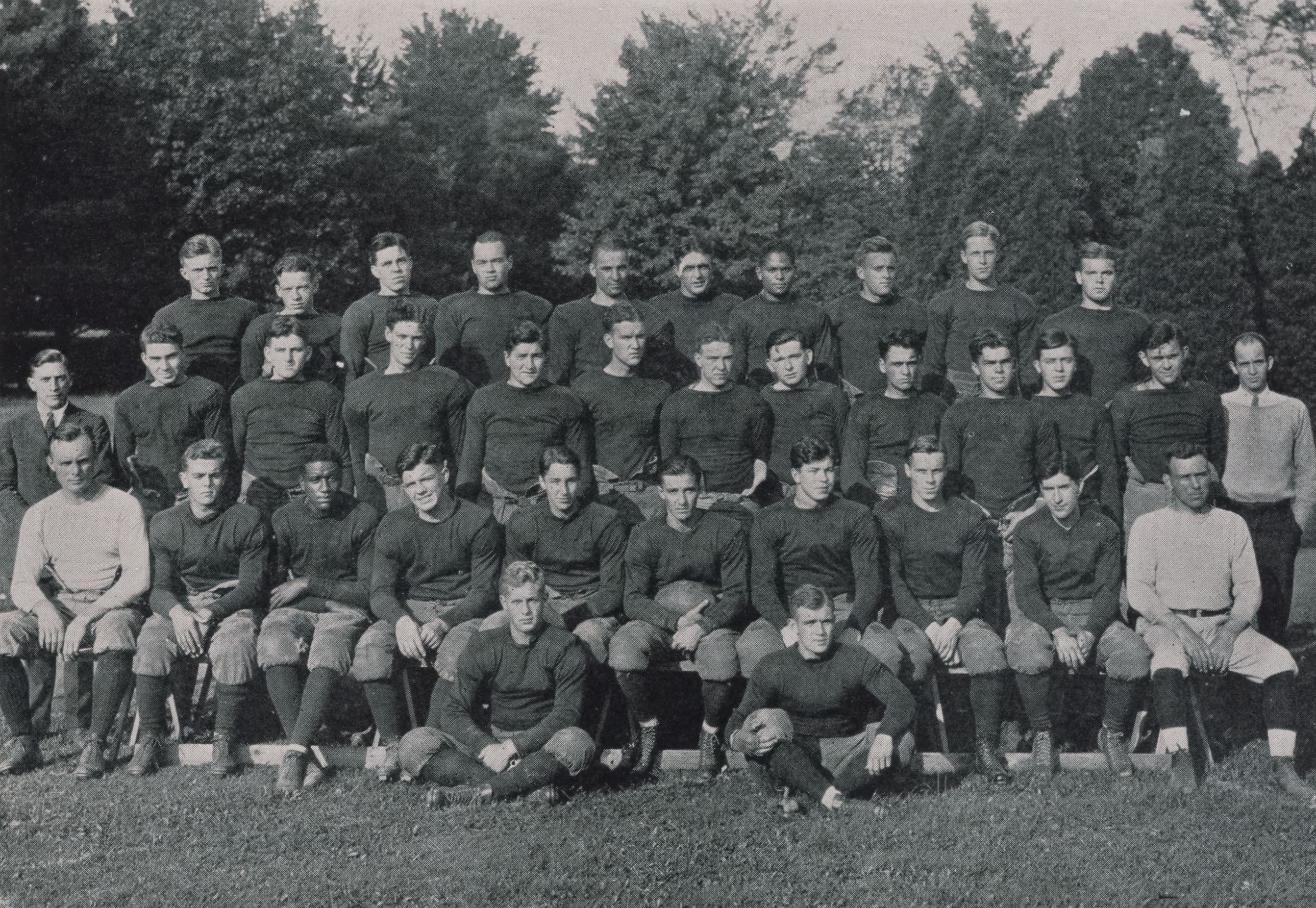
The Amherst Varsity Football Squad, 1923. In the front row, third from left, is future New York City Councilman Benjamin J. Davis Jr.

Amherst claims its athletics program as the oldest in the nation, pointing to its compulsory physical fitness regimen put in place in 1860 (the mandate that all students participate in sports or pursue physical education has been discontinued). One-third of the student body participates in sports at the intercollegiate level, and eighty percent participate in intramural and club sports teams.

The game between Amherst College and Wesleyan University during the 2021 season has been coined as "The Mud-Bowl Miracle." In the 4th overtime of the game, after a fourth down conversion by junior RB Louis Eckelkamp, junior QB Brad Breckenridge completed a one-handed lob over his head to his favorite wideout junior Carson Ochsenhirt to score the winning touchdown. 5th year CB Ricky Goodson sealed the win shortly thereafter.

== Postseason appearances ==
=== NCAA Division III playoffs ===
The Mammoths will make their first appearance in the NCAA Division III playoffs in 2026, the first year of NESCAC participation.

Year	Round	Opponent	Result
2026	First Round	Bridgewater State	TBP
