= Pratt Field (Massachusetts) =

Football field in Amherst, Massachusetts, US

Coordinates: 42.36901°N 72.52432°W

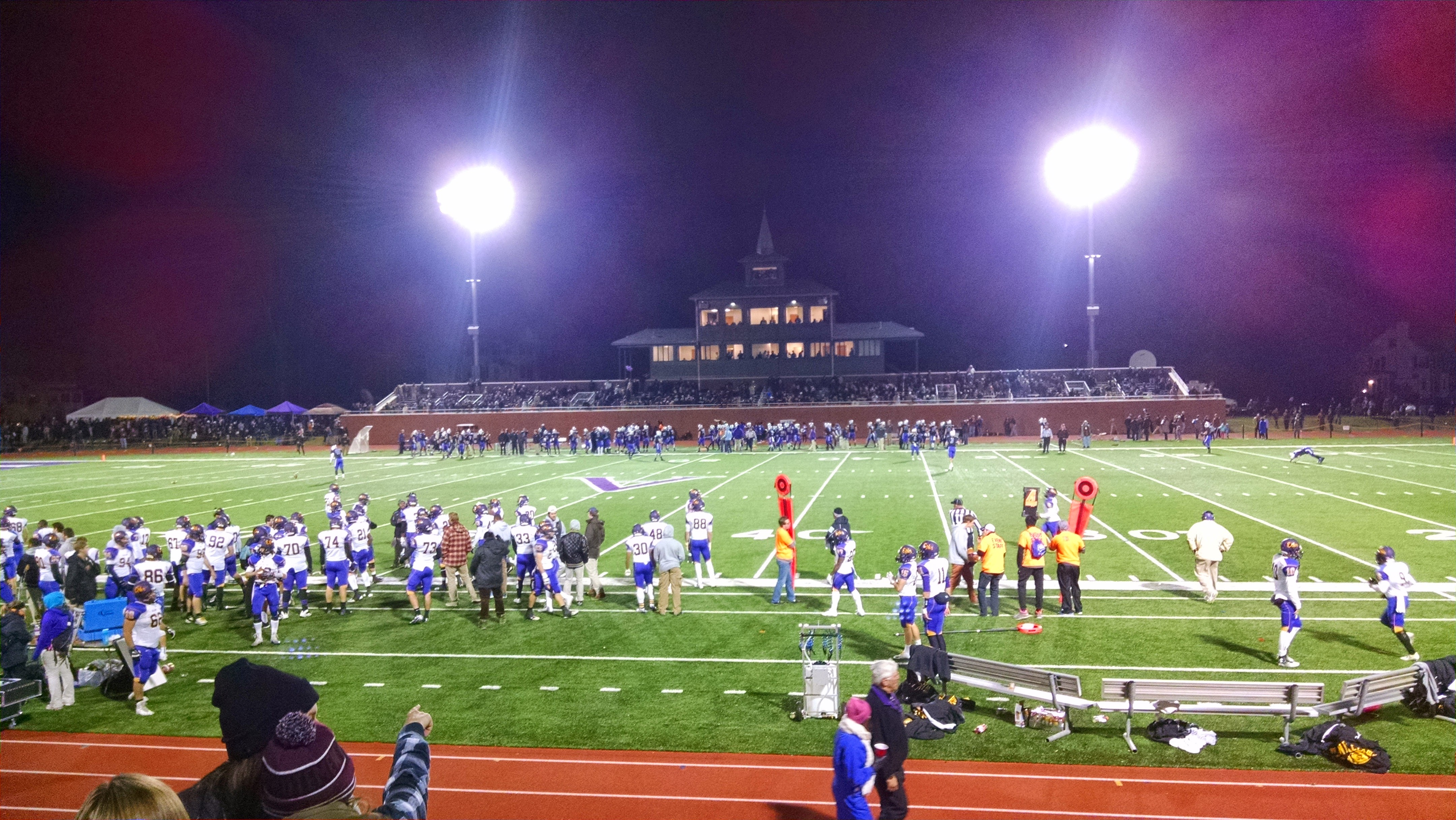
The field during the 2014 Biggest Little Game in America between Amherst and Williams.

Pratt Field at Lehrman Stadium is the football field of Amherst College, constructed in 1891. Considered the third-oldest college NCAA football site in the nation, the field was renovated in 2015 to include a new field house, track, and a shifted playing field. It previously served as the seasonal home for the college's ice hockey team.
