= List of NCAA Division II men's basketball tournament bids by school =

This is a list of NCAA Division II men's basketball tournament bids by school, as of the conclusion of the 2026 tournament. As of 2026, there are a total of 64 bids possible (23 automatic qualifiers, 41 at-large).

== Division II members ==
- Teams in **bold** are currently competing in the 2026 NCAA Division II men's basketball tournament.
- Appearances include those made by schools in the NCAA College Division Men's Basketball Tournament, the direct predecessor to the current Division II and Division III tournaments. The NCAA did not adopt its current three-division alignment until the 1973–74 school year, when the College Division was split into Divisions II and III.
- School names reflect those in current use by their respective athletic programs, not necessarily those used when a school made an appearance in the Division II tournament. For example, Jefferson was known as Philadelphia College of Textiles & Science (athletically "Philadelphia Textile") when it won its NCAA title in 1970, Utah Tech was known as Dixie State during its Division II tenure, and Omaha used its institutional identity of Nebraska–Omaha when it made all of its D-II tournament appearances.
- Vacated appearances are not included in the standings.

Bids by school		First bid	Most recent		Sweet 16		Elite 8		Final 4		Finals		Champions	
#	School	First bid	Bid	Win	Last	#	Last	#	Last	#	Last	#	Last	#
39	Kentucky Wesleyan	1957	2024	2012	2012	24	2002	19	2002	18	2002	12	2001	8
38	Jefferson (Note: The team qualified for the 2020 NCAA Division II men's basketball tournament before it was canceled due to the COVID-19 pandemic. However, appearances in said tournament are still counted in the standings.) (Philadelphia Textile, Philadelphia)	1958	2024	2010	2010	15	1993	5	1970	1	1970	1	1970	1
35	Florida Southern	1972	2026	2025	2024	12	2015	10	2015	7	2015	3	2015	2
31	Virginia Union	1961	2026	2026	2007	14	2006	8	2006	7	2006	4	2005	3
29	Assumption	1960	2026	2025	2025	13	2025	6	1975	3				
29	Seattle Pacific	1962	2025	2019	2013	12	2006	3	2006	2				
28	**Gannon**	1962	2026	2026	2026	9	2026	7	2026	2	2026	2	2026	1
26	Saint Anselm	1960	2026	2026	2026	8	2019	2	2019	1				
24	Bridgeport	1968	2025	2013	2013	7	1992	5	1992	3	1992	2		
24	Northwest Missouri State	1982	2024	2024	2024	12	2022	6	2022	4	2022	4	2022	4
23	Central Missouri	1965	2026	2026	2014	10	2014	5	2014	4	2014	2	2014	2
23	Southern New Hampshire (New Hampshire College)	1980	2025	2024	2024	11	2024	8	1994	2				
22	West Texas A&M (West Texas State)	1987	2025	2024	2024	7	2024	5	2024	3	2021	1		
21	Bentley	1972	2026	2023	2023	11	2022	4	2010	2				
20	Indiana (PA)	1994	2026	2026	2026	12	2022	7	2022	5	2015	2		
19	Adelphi	1958	2026	2012	2002	6	2002	3						
19	MSU Denver (Metropolitan State (CO), Metro State)	1990	2015	2014	2014	10	2014	8	2014	5	2013	4	2002	2
18	Alabama–Huntsville	2000	2026	2026	2026	9	2012	2						
18	Cal State San Bernardino	1999	2025	2025	2024	7	2024	5	2024	3				
18	Chico State	1958	2025	2024	2022	3	2022	3						
18	Ferris State	1983	2025	2024	2024	7	2024	3	2018	1	2018	1	2018	1
18	Washburn	1992	2026	2025	2025	5	2025	4	2025	3	2001	1		
18	West Liberty	2007	2026	2025	2025	11	2025	8	2023	5	2023	2		
17	Alaska Anchorage	1982	2026	2012	2008	6	2008	2	2008	2	1988	1		
17	Cal Poly Pomona	1962	2022	2015	2010	6	2010	5	2010	2	2010	2	2010	1
17	Lewis	1982	2021	2009	2002	2								
17	Tampa	1984	2025	2008	2001	8	2001	1	2001	1				
16	Augusta	1978	2025	2023	2022	6	2022	4	2022	3	2022	2		
16	California (PA)	1985	2026	2026	2022	7	2008	3	1996	2				
16	Columbus State	1978	2026	2026	2000	2								
16	Delta State	1972	2019	2014	2014	7	1998	2	1987	1				
16	Fairmont State	1996	2026	2017	2017	3	2017	2	2017	1	2017	1		
16	Minnesota State–Mankato (Mankato State)	1964	2024	2024	2024	6	2024	2	2024	2	2024	1	2024	1
16	St. Cloud State	1974	2026	2026	2010	4	2010	2	2010	1				
16	Winston–Salem State	1966	2023	2002	2001	4	1967	1	1967	1	1967	1	1967	1
15	Augustana (SD)	1975	2022	2022	2022	5	2016	1	2016	1	2016	1	2016	1
15	Cal Poly Humboldt (Humboldt State)	1983	2026	2007	2007	3	2004	1	2004	1				
15	Catawba	1998	2026	2024	1998	1								
15	Findlay	2002	2022	2019	2018	5	2009	2	2009	1	2009	1	2009	1
15	Fort Hays State	1995	2025	2011	1997	3	1996	1	1996	1	1996	1	1996	1
15	Lincoln Memorial	2011	2026	2023	2023	5	2023	4	2021	3	2016	1		
15	Northern State (SD)	1996	2023	2021	2021	5	2018	2	2018	1	2018	1		
14	Central Oklahoma	1992	2023	2011	2011	5	2008	1						
14	Colorado Mines	2010	2025	2025	2025	4	2021	2						
14	Indianapolis	1996	2024	2024	2015	1								
14	Rollins	1974	2017	2017	2017	4	2017	2						
14	Saint Michael's	1957	2026	2026	2024	8	1965	4	1965	2	1958	1		
14	Valdosta State	1976	2025	2010	2010	4	2010	1						
13	Eckerd	1973	2018	2018	2018	3	2003	1						
13	Fort Lewis	2002	2024	2024	2011	1								
13	Lincoln (MO)	1959	2025	1978	1978	6	1978	1						
13	Michigan Tech	1963	2026	2026	2026	3	2026	1						
13	Montevallo	2004	2026	2026	2015	8	2012	3	2012	1	2012	1		
13	Wayne State (MI)	1970	2021	2005	2004	6	1993	2	1993	1				
12	Ashland	1968	2026	2021	1991	5	1991	3	1969	2				
12	Colorado Mesa (Mesa State)	1994	2026	2024	2024	2								
12	Grand Valley State	1985	2026	2026	2008	4	2008	2						
12	Johnson C. Smith	1960	2009	2002	2001	2	2001	1						
12	Midwestern State	1999	2025	2025	2014	5	2012	3						
12	Millersville	1985	2024	2008	2008	6	1989	1						
12	Missouri Western	1990	2026	1998	1990	1								
12	Montana State Billings (Eastern Montana)	1981	2024	1997	1997	2	1987	1	1987	1				
12	Northern Michigan	1979	2026	2026	1993	3	1981	2						
12	Wingate	1999	2024	2016	2007	1	2007	1						
11	Angelo State	1988	2024	2023	2016	2								
11	Benedict (SC)	1980	2024	2013	2008	1								
11	Drury	2000	2019	2014	2014	3	2014	2	2013	1	2013	1	2013	1
11	Nebraska–Kearney	1991	2016	2016	2004	3	2003	1						
11	St. Mary's (TX)	2001	2026	2026	2013	1								
11	Truman (Northeast Missouri State)	1960	2022	2021	2021	5	2021	3	1999	1				
11	UNC Pembroke	2011	2025	2025	2025	1								
11	USC Aiken	1998	2025	2025	2023	4	2014	2	2014	1				
11	Winona State	2001	2025	2025	2013	4	2013	4	2008	3	2008	3	2008	2
10	American International	1966	2015	2015	1985	3	1985	2						
10	Central Washington	1999	2025	2025	2000	1								
10	Charleston (WV)	1999	2026	2024	2024	1								
10	Dallas Baptist	2009	2026	2026	2026	2	2025	1	2025	1				
10	Lenoir–Rhyne	1995	2026	2026	2026	3	2025	1						
10	Minnesota State–Moorhead (Moorhead State)	1965	2025	2025	2025	3	2015	1						
10	St. Thomas Aquinas	2016	2025	2025	2025	5	2017	1						
10	San Francisco State	1960	2017	1969	1969	1	1969	1						
10	West Chester	1983	2025	2018										
9	Albany State (GA)	1973	2007	1998										
9	Arkansas Tech	2009	2024	2012	2012	1								
9	Barry	2005	2022	2018	2018	2	2018	2						
9	Belmont Abbey	1959	2022	2002	1961	1								
9	East Stroudsburg	1990	2025	2018	2018	3	2018	1						
9	Minnesota–Duluth	1957	2026	2026	2026	2	2023	1						
9	Salem (WV) (Salem–Teikyo, Salem International)	1997	2006	2005	2005	6	1999	2	1997	1				
9	Southern Connecticut	1982	2024	2015	2015	4	2014	2						
9	Western Washington	2001	2020	2013	2013	4	2013	3	2013	3	2012	1	2012	1
8	Bloomsburg	1963	1996	1989	1989	5	1983	3						
8	Cal State Dominguez Hills	1981	2026	2026	2025	2	2025	1	2025	1	2025	1		
8	Edinboro	1982	2008	1998										
8	Harding	2003	2026	2013										
8	Henderson State	1999	2020	2007	2003	3								
8	Hillsdale	1995	2023	2022	2022	2	2022	1						
8	Lander	1995	2026	2026	2026	3	2026	2	2026	1	2026	1		
8	Lubbock Christian	2016	2026	2022	2021	1								
8	Missouri Southern	1993	2020	2019	2019	2	2000	1	2000	1				
8	Morehouse	1981	2026	1990	1990	1	1990	1	1990	1				
8	Point Loma (Point Loma Nazarene)	2018	2026	2026	2026	4	2019	1	2019	1	2019	1		
8	Texas A&M–Kingsville (Texas A&I)	1992	2023	2017										
8	West Alabama	1978	2026	2026	1982	1								
7	Barton	1997	2013	2013	2013	3	2007	2	2007	1	2007	1	2007	1
7	Dominican (NY)	2013	2025	2025										
7	Franklin Pierce	1991	2022	2013	2013	3	2013	1						
7	Georgia College	1997	2022	2006	2006	2	2000	1						
7	Lake Superior State	1996	2025	2025	2025	2	2025	1						
7	Lynn	1997	2025	2025	2019	5	2005	2	2005	2				
7	Mount Olive	2004	2015	2015	2015	2	2015	2						
7	Nova Southeastern	2019	2026	2026	2026	6	2026	6	2026	4	2025	3	2025	2
7	Pace	1992	2025	2022										
7	Parkside (Wisconsin–Parkside)	2007	2023	2016										
7	Pittsburg State	1997	2024	2005	1997	1								
7	Quincy (IL)	1995	2017	2010	2010	1								
7	St. Edward's	2006	2026	2026	2019	1								
7	Southwest Minnesota State (Southwest State)	2001	2025	2018	2017	3	2009	2						
7	Virginia State	1982	2025	2025										
7	West Virginia State	2004	2024	2022										
6	Bowie State	2003	2017	2005	2005	2	2003	1	2003	1				
6	Cal State East Bay (Cal State Hayward)	1977	2026	2026	2026	4	2026	3						
6	Cal State Los Angeles	1957	2024	1998	1959	2	1959	2	1959	2				
6	Carson–Newman	2002	2025	2002	2002	1								
6	Chaminade	2006	2019	2008										
6	Clark Atlanta	1996	2024											
6	Daemen	2019	2026	2026	2026	2	2026	2						
6	Elizabeth City State	1978	2007	1997	1997	3	1997	2						
6	Regis (CO)	1957	2025	2018	1958	2								
6	UMSL	1972	2025	2025	2025	5	2023	2						
6	Wheeling (Wheeling Jesuit)	2005	2018	2017	2017	1								
5	Alaska	1989	2022	2022	2022	3								
5	Anderson (SC)	2010	2026	2012	2012	2	2011	1						
5	Christian Brothers	2008	2017	2012	2012	2	2009	1						
5	Colorado State–Pueblo (Southern Colorado)	1967	1998	1972	1972	1	1972	1						
5	District of Columbia	1982	2012	2004	1983	2	1983	2	1983	2	1983	2	1982	1
5	Fayetteville State	1973	2026	2025										
5	Kutztown	1988	2017	2016	2016	2								
5	Miles	1974	2023											
5	Northeastern State	2000	2013	2003	2003	1	2003	1	2003	1	2003	1	2003	1
5	Pittsburgh–Johnstown	1997	2023	2008										
5	Queens (NY)	2001	2017											
5	Shaw	1995	2012	2012	2012	2	2002	1	2002	1				
5	Shippensburg	1991	2020	2018	2018	1								
5	Slippery Rock	1990	2015	2015										
5	Southwest Baptist	1990	2009	2009	2009	2	1991	1						
5	Tuskegee	1959	2023	2014	2014	1	2014	1						
5	Walsh	2019	2026	2026	2026	1								
4	Adams State	2007	2013											
4	Arkansas–Fort Smith	2014	2018											
4	Eastern New Mexico	1993	2026	1993	1993	1								
4	Embry–Riddle (FL)	2020	2024	2024	2022	1								
4	Emmanuel (GA)	2019	2024	2024	2021	1								
4	Lee	2020	2024	2021										
4	Missouri S&T	1975	2025	2025	1996	1								
4	Northwest Nazarene	2021	2026	2021	2021	1								
4	Rockhurst	2002	2026	2002	2002	1								
4	Saint Augustine's	1983	2010	2010	1997	3	1984	1	1984	1	1984	1		
4	Saint Leo	2012	2016	2014										
4	Saint Martin's	2018	2026	2026	2019	1								
4	Southern Nazarene	2018	2023	2023	2023	1								
4	Union (TN)	1962	2022	2022	1968	1								
4	Upper Iowa	2013	2024	2024										
4	Western Oregon	2015	2019	2018	2018	2	2016	1	2016	1				
3	Arkansas–Monticello	2006	2021	2006	2006	1								
3	Black Hills State	2022	2026	2026	2026	3	2026	3	2023	2				
3	Caldwell	2007	2023	2023										
3	Clayton State	2007	2018	2018	2008	1								
3	Concord (WV)	1997	2024	1997	1997	1								
3	Emporia State	2004	2023	2023										
3	Felician	2010	2026	2026										
3	Florida Tech	1989	2012	2012	1990	1								
3	Francis Marion	2004	2019	2004	2004	1								
3	Georgia Southwestern	2011	2021											
3	Hawaii Pacific	1999	2026	2017										
3	King (TN)	2012	2018											
3	LeMoyne–Owen	1999	2009											
3	Livingstone	2013	2015											
3	Mansfield	1984	2011	1984										
3	North Georgia	2023	2026	2024	2024	1	2024	1						
3	Oklahoma Baptist	2020	2026	2026	2026	1	2026	1	2026	1				
3	Southeastern Oklahoma State	2007	2020	2019	2007	1								
3	Tusculum	2005	2021	2021										
3	Wayne State (NE)	1999	2021	2000	2000	1								
3	West Virginia Wesleyan	2002	2012	2012										
2	Bemidji State	2004	2012											
2	Biola	2021	2025	2021										
2	Bluefield State	1996	2025											
2	Cal State San Marcos	2022	2023	2023										
2	Central State (OH)	1982	2010	1982	1982	1								
2	Claflin	2009	2018	2018										
2	Clarion	1981	2001	1981	1981	1								
2	Colorado Christian	1993	2008											
2	Flagler	2021	2022	2021	2021	1	2021	1	2021	1				
2	Glenville State	2014	2015											
2	Hawaii–Hilo	2003	2005	2005										
2	Holy Family	2008	2016											
2	Kentucky State	1962	2001	1962										
2	Lock Haven	1987	1989	1989										
2	Malone	2021	2025											
2	Mississippi Christian (Mississippi College)	1978	1995	1995										
2	New Mexico Highlands	2010	2019											
2	Ouachita Baptist	2008	2016	2008										
2	Palm Beach Atlantic	2020	2026											
2	Rogers State	2020	2026											
2	Savannah State	2022	2025											
2	Southern Arkansas	2021	2023											
2	Southwestern Oklahoma State	2005	2022											
2	Texas A&M International	2011	2014											
2	UC Colorado Springs	2014	2015	2015										
2	UT Permian Basin	2017	2018	2018	2018	1								
2	William Jewell	2024	2026											
1	Cameron (OK)	2013	2013											
1	Cedarville	2022	2022											
1	Concordia–Irvine	2019	2019											
1	Concordia–St. Paul	2025	2025	2025										
1	Davenport	2022	2022											
1	East Central (OK)	2017	2017	2017										
1	Fort Valley State	1998	1998											
1	Fresno Pacific	2021	2021											
1	Goldey–Beacom	2026	2026											
1	Lake Erie	2026	2026											
1	Lane	2005	2005											
1	Lees–McRae	2018	2018											
1	Lincoln (PA)	2024	2024											
1	Mary (ND)	2011	2011											
1	McKendree	2023	2023	2023	2023	1								
1	Minot State	2025	2025											
1	Molloy	2019	2019											
1	Newman	2013	2013											
1	North Greenville	2015	2015											
1	Northwood (MI)	1999	1999											
1	Ohio Dominican	2018	2018											
1	Post (CT)	2024	2024	2024										
1	Saginaw Valley State	2016	2016	2016	2016	1	2016	1						
1	Southern Wesleyan	2020	2020											
1	Stanislaus State	2014	2014	2014	2014	1								
1	Western Colorado	1993	1993	1993										
1	Western New Mexico	2026	2026											
1	Young Harris	2026	2026	2026										

=== Teams with no appearances ===
The following active Division II teams are still awaiting their first tournament bids, as of 2026. Conference affiliations are for the upcoming 2026–27 season.

- **California Collegiate Athletic Association** (3) – Cal State Monterey Bay, Menlo, UC Merced
- **Central Atlantic Collegiate Conference** (3) – Chestnut Hill, Georgian Court, Wilmington (DE)
  - Monroe joins in 2027–28 but is not eligible for the NCAA tournament until 2029–30 or 2030–31.
- **Conference Carolinas** (5) – Chowan, Converse, Erskine, Ferrum, Shorter
  - Ferrum is not eligible for the NCAA tournament until 2027–28.
- **East Coast Conference** (4) – D'Youville, Mercy, Roberts Wesleyan, Staten Island
- **Great American Conference** (1) – Northwestern Oklahoma State
- **Great Lakes Intercollegiate Athletic Conference** (2) – Purdue Northwest, Roosevelt
- **Great Lakes Valley Conference** (2) – Maryville (MO), UIS
- **Great Midwest Athletic Conference** (2) – Thomas More, Tiffin
- **Great Northwest Athletic Conference** (1) – Simon Fraser
  - Simon Fraser plans to leave the NCAA after the 2026–27 season and rejoin Canada's governing body of U Sports.
- **Gulf South Conference** (2) – Auburn Montgomery, Trevecca Nazarene
  - Loyola New Orleans joins in 2027–28 but is not eligible for the NCAA tournament until 2029–30 or 2030–31.
- **Lone Star Conference** (4) – Oklahoma Christian, Sul Ross State, UT Dallas, UT Tyler
  - Texas A&M–Texarkana joins in 2027–28 and Texas Wesleyan in 2028–29, but are ineligible for the NCAA tournament until 2030–31 and 2031–32 respectively.
- **Mountain East Conference** (4) – Davis & Elkins, Frostburg State, Point Park, Shawnee State
  - Shawnee State is not eligible for the NCAA tournament until no later than 2029–30.
- **Northern Sun Intercollegiate Conference** (3) – Jamestown, Minnesota–Crookston, Sioux Falls
- **Pacific West Conference** (4) – Dominican (CA), Jessup, Vanguard, Westmont
- **Peach Belt Conference** (2) – Middle Georgia, USC Beaufort
  - Middle Georgia is not eligible for the NCAA tournament until 2028–29.
- **Pennsylvania State Athletic Conference** (2) – Seton Hill, Shepherd
  - Lackawanna joins in 2027–28 but is not eligible until for the NCAA tournament until 2029–30 or 2030–31.
- **Rocky Mountain Athletic Conference** (3) – Chadron State, South Dakota Mines, Westminster (UT)
- **South Atlantic Conference** (5) – Coker, Emory & Henry, Mars Hill, Newberry, UVA Wise
- **Southern Intercollegiate Athletic Conference** (3) – Allen, Edward Waters, Spring Hill

== Former Division II members ==
Bids by school		Current level	First bid	Most recent		Sweet 16		Elite 8		Final 4		Finals		Champions	
#	School	Current level	First bid	Bid	Win	Last	#	Last	#	Last	#	Last	#	Last	#
29	Southern Indiana (Note: The team qualified for the 2020 NCAA Division II men's basketball tournament before it was canceled due to the COVID-19 pandemic. However, appearances in said tournament are still counted in the standings.) (Indiana State–Evansville)	Division I	1978	2021	2021	2019	11	2019	4	2019	4	2004	3	1995	1
24	South Dakota State	Division I	1959	2004	2004	2002	15	1997	8	1985	3	1985	2	1963	1
21	Bellarmine	Division I	1963	2020	2019	2019	9	2017	4	2017	4	2011	1	2011	1
21	Cal State Bakersfield	Division I	1973	2006	2006	1997	12	1997	9	1997	8	1997	4	1997	3
20	Cheyney	Independent	1965	2008	2004	1986	11	1986	8	1986	3	1978	1	1978	1
19	North Dakota	Division I	1965	2000	2000	1993	10	1991	8	1990	3				
19	West Georgia	Division I	1975	2024	2024	2002	4	2002	1						
17	LIU Post (C.W. Post)	Division I (Note: LIU Brooklyn and LIU Post ceased to exist as separate programs in 2019 when Long Island University merged the two campuses' athletic programs, creating the current LIU Sharks. The Sharks inherited Brooklyn's Division I membership.)	1962	2012	2009	2009	6	2009	2						
17	UC Riverside	Division I	1970	1997	1995	1995	11	1995	7	1995	3	1995	1		
15	Evansville	Division I	1957	1976	1976	1976	13	1971	8	1971	6	1971	5	1971	5
15	Le Moyne	Division I	1959	2020	2018	2018	3	2018	1						
15	Norfolk State	Division I	1965	1995	1995	1995	8	1995	5	1995	1				
15	Stonehill	Division I	1971	2020	2016	2016	4	2016	3	2012	2				
14	Mount St. Mary's	Division I	1957	1987	1987	1987	9	1985	5	1985	5	1981	2	1962	1
14	North Alabama	Division I	1977	2014	2014	2008	9	1996	8	1991	5	1991	2	1991	2
14	Queens (NC)	Division I	1996	2022	2022	2022	7	2019	4	2018	2				
14	Saint Rose	Defunct	1992	2018	2018	2017	4	1999	3	1998	1				
14	Tarleton	Division I	2002	2017	2016	2016	6	2016	4	2015	2				
13	Northern Kentucky	Division I	1978	2012	2011	2007	5	1997	2	1997	2	1997	2		
13	Sacred Heart	Division I	1971	1989	1989	1989	9	1989	7	1986	2	1986	1	1986	1
13	South Dakota	Division I	1957	2008	2005	2005	5	1994	4	1958	1	1958	1	1958	1
13	Southeast Missouri State	Division I	1961	1990	1990	1990	11	1990	10	1989	3	1989	3		
12	Omaha (Nebraska–Omaha)	Division I	1975	2010	2008	1982	2								
12	UC Davis	Division I	1967	2000	2000	1998	1	1998	1	1998	1	1998	1	1998	1
11	BYU–Hawaii	Defunct	2000	2015	2011	2011	4	2011	1	2011	1	2011	1		
11	Hartwick	Division III	1965	1980	1980	1980	6	1971	1						
11	Merrimack	Division I	1977	2019	2018	1978	2								
11	Puget Sound	Division III	1970	1984	1984	1984	8	1981	4	1976	1	1976	1	1976	1
11	St. Joseph's (IN)	Defunct	1970	2010	2010	2010	5	2010	4						
11	Springfield	Division III	1961	1986	1980	1980	3								
10	Alabama A&M	Division I	1985	1997	1997	1997	5	1996	4						
10	Bloomfield	USCAA	2005	2024	2021	2018	3	2011	1						
10	Missouri State (Southwest Missouri State)	Division I	1958	1978	1978	1978	9	1974	5	1974	4	1974	4		
10	New Haven	Division I	1987	2023	2023	2023	2	2023	1						
10	UMass Lowell (Lowell)	Division I	1988	2012	2006	2006	4	2004	2	1988	1	1988	1	1988	1
9	Abilene Christian	Division I	1959	1999	1999	1999	5	1966	1						
9	Akron	Division I	1958	1975	1975	1975	8	1975	6	1972	3	1972	2		
9	Alderson Broaddus	Defunct	2002	2010	2009	2006	2								
9	Chapman	Division III	1957	1984	1983	1983	5	1960	2	1960	1	1960	1		
9	East Texas A&M (East Texas State, Texas A&M–Commerce)	Division I	1996	2022	2019	2005	2	1997	1						
9	Grand Canyon	Division I	1992	2013	2007										
9	Randolph–Macon	Division III	1965	1985	1977	1977	2	1977	1	1977	1	1977	1		
9	Utah Tech (Dixie State)	Division I	2010	2020	2011	2011	1								
9	Youngstown State	Division I	1961	1977	1972	1972	1								
8	Armstrong State (Armstrong Atlantic)	Defunct	1975	2009	1995										
8	Jacksonville State	Division I	1980	1992	1992	1992	5	1992	4	1989	2	1985	1	1985	1
8	North Dakota State	Division I	1971	1997	1997	1994	2								
8	Tennessee State	Division I	1963	1975	1975	1975	6	1975	4	1975	4	1973	2		
8	Wright State	Division I	1976	1986	1986	1986	4	1986	2	1983	1	1983	1	1983	1
7	Azusa Pacific	Division III	2015	2024	2024	2024	2	2015	1						
7	Bryant	Division I	1978	2008	2008	2007	3	2005	1	2005	1	2005	1		
7	Cal Poly	Division I	1971	1986	1982	1982	4	1981	2	1981	1				
7	Fresno State	Division I	1958	1966	1966	1966	6	1966	2						
7	Mercyhurst	Division I	2015	2023	2023	2019	1	2019	1						
7	North Carolina Central	Division I	1957	1997	1993	1993	5	1993	3	1989	1	1989	1	1989	1
7	Old Dominion	Division I	1969	1976	1976	1976	5	1976	3	1976	3	1975	2	1975	1
7	Sonoma State	Defunct	1973	2017	1974	1974	1								
7	Southern Illinois	Division I	1959	1966	1966	1966	6	1966	4	1966	4	1966	2		
7	Wittenberg	Division III	1959	1974	1974	1974	5	1963	3	1963	2	1963	2	1961	1
6	Arkansas State	Division I	1958	1967	1962	1962	1								
6	Buffalo	Division I	1957	1965	1965	1965	2	1957	1						
6	Buffalo State	Division III	1967	1976	1971	1971	3	1970	1	1970	1				
6	Central Connecticut	Division I	1966	1984	1971	1971	2	1966	1						
6	Eastern Illinois	Division I	1975	1980	1980	1980	4	1978	2	1978	2				
6	Green Bay (Wisconsin–Green Bay)	Division I	1974	1981	1981	1981	5	1981	3	1981	3	1979	2		
6	Northeastern	Division I	1962	1968	1964	1964	3	1963	2						
6	Roanoke	Division III	1968	1979	1973	1973	2	1973	2	1972	1	1972	1	1972	1
6	UC San Diego	Division I	2008	2020	2019	2017	2								
6	UCF	Division I	1976	1982	1981	1981	4	1978	1	1978	1				
6	USC Upstate (USC Spartanburg)	Division I	1991	2006	2005	1992	2								
5	Albright	Division III	1961	1974	1974	1974	2								
5	California Baptist	Division I	2014	2018	2018	2018	2	2018	1						
5	Chattanooga (UT Chattanooga, Tennessee–Chattanooga)	Division I	1961	1977	1977	1977	3	1977	2	1977	2	1977	2	1977	1
5	Illinois State	Division I	1957	1969	1969	1969	3	1969	2	1967	1				
5	Jackson State	Division I	1957	1968	1957	1957	1								
5	Lamar	Division I	1960	1966	1963	1963	1								
5	Pfeiffer	Division III	1996	2017	2005	2004	2	2004	1						
5	San Diego	Division I	1966	1979	1978	1978	1	1978	1						
5	SIU Edwardsville	Division I	1986	2006	2006	2006	3	2006	1						
5	South Carolina State	Division I	1958	1967	1967	1967	2								
5	Troy	Division I	1977	1993	1993	1993	4	1993	2	1993	2	1993	1		
5	Valparaiso	Division I	1962	1973	1973	1973	5	1967	2						
4	Augustana (IL)	Division III	1959	1971											
4	Austin Peay	Division I	1958	1963	1961	1961	2	1961	1						
4	Concordia Chicago (Concordia [IL])	Division III	1962	1969	1962	1962	1								
4	Cornell College	Division III	1960	1970	1960	1960	1	1960	1	1960	1				
4	Drexel	Division I	1957	1967											
4	Florida A&M	Division I	1957	1978	1978	1978	3								
4	Hartford	Division III	1972	1975	1974	1974	2								
4	Hofstra	Division I	1959	1964	1964	1964	3	1964	1						
4	Limestone	Defunct	2011	2017	2017										
4	Nevada	Division I	1957	1966											
4	New Orleans (LSU–New Orleans)	Division I	1971	1975	1975	1975	2	1975	2	1975	2	1975	1		
4	North Carolina A&T	Division I	1958	1964	1964	1964	3	1964	2	1964	2				
4	Northern Colorado	Division I	1964	1989	1989	1989	1								
4	Oakland	Division I	1994	1997	1997	1997	1								
4	Oglethorpe	Division III	1963	1969	1969	1969	3	1969	2	1963	1				
4	Presbyterian	Division I	1996	2006	2006	2003	1								
4	Quinnipiac	Division I	1976	1988											
4	Rochester (NY)	Division III	1961	1968	1968										
4	Sacramento State	Division I	1959	1988	1962	1962	1	1962	1	1962	1	1962	1		
4	Transylvania	Division III	1969	1973	1973										
4	UC Irvine	Division I	1968	1975	1968	1968	1								
4	UNLV	Division I	1965	1969	1969	1969	3	1968	1						
4	Wabash	Division III	1958	1961	1961	1961	2								
4	Wagner	Division I	1958	1969	1969	1969	3								
4	Wartburg	Division III	1957	1960											
4	Wheaton (IL)	Division III	1957	1960	1960	1960	4	1960	3	1958	2	1957	1	1957	1
3	American	Division I	1958	1960	1960	1960	3	1960	3						
3	Baltimore	Defunct	1975	1977	1977	1977	2								
3	Bethune–Cookman	Division I	1965	1980											
3	Cal State Northridge	Division I	1978	1985	1985	1985	2								
3	Capital (OH)	Division III	1957	1973											
3	Centenary (LA)	Division III	1957	1959	1959	1959	1								
3	Central Michigan	Division I	1965	1971	1971	1971	3								
3	Fairfield	Division I	1960	1962	1962	1962	2								
3	Franciscan (Steubenville)	Division III	1965	1973	1973	1973	2								
3	Incarnate Word	Division I	2002	2010	2002										
3	Indiana State	Division I	1966	1968	1968	1968	2	1968	1	1968	1	1968	1		
3	Kennesaw State	Division I	2003	2005	2004	2004	1	2004	1	2004	1	2004	1	2004	1
3	LIU Brooklyn	Division I	1965	1967	1967	1967	3	1967	2						
3	Longwood	Division I	1994	2001	2001										
3	Montclair State	Division III	1969	1971	1970	1970	2	1969	1						
3	Morgan State	Division I	1974	1976	1974	1974	1	1974	1	1974	1	1974	1	1974	1
3	Morningside	NAIA	1983	1995	1995	1995	3	1995	3	1983	1				
3	Nebraska Wesleyan	Division III	1962	1964	1963	1963	2	1962	1	1962	1				
3	Nicholls	Division I	1976	1980	1980	1980	3	1979	2						
3	Northern Iowa	Division I	1962	1979	1979	1979	3	1964	1	1964	1				
3	NYIT	On hiatus	1978	2004	2004	1980	1	1980	1	1980	1	1980	1		
3	Paine	NCCAA	1994	2002	1994										
3	St. Olaf	Division III	1969	1972	1972										
3	St. Thomas (FL)	NAIA	1972	1982	1972	1972	1								
3	San Diego State	Division I	1957	1968	1967	1967	2	1967	2						
3	Southern	Division I	1974	1977											
3	Stetson	Division I	1967	1971	1970	1970	1	1970	1						
3	Stillman	NAIA	2006	2016	2016	2011	1								
3	SUNY Potsdam (Potsdam State)	Division III	1966	1974	1974										
3	Trinity (TX)	Division III	1960	1968	1968	1968	1	1968	1	1968	1				
3	Washington–St. Louis	Division III	1963	1965	1965	1965	2	1965	1						
3	Western Illinois	Division I	1959	1981	1981	1981	2								
2	Academy of Art	Defunct	2022	2023	2023										
2	Alabama State	Division I	1972	1975											
2	Chicago	Division III	1961	1974	1961	1961	1	1961	1						
2	Coe	Division III	1973	1974	1973	1973	1	1973	1						
2	Colorado College	Division III	1960	1961											
2	Denver	Division I	1992	1996	1992	1992	1								
2	DePauw	Division III	1957	1968											
2	Dowling	Defunct	1995	1998											
2	Fisk	NAIA	1964	1974	1974	1974	2								
2	Grambling State	Division I	1958	1976	1976	1976	2	1958	1						
2	Hampton	Division I	1983	1991											
2	High Point	Division I	1996	1997	1997										
2	Hiram	Division III	1973	1974	1974										
2	Hope	Division III	1958	1959	1959	1959	2	1959	1						
2	Ithaca	Division III	1964	1972											
2	James Madison (Madison)	Division I	1974	1976											
2	Knox	Division III	1958	1959	1959	1959	2								
2	Linfield	Division III	1957	1958	1957	1957	1								
2	Louisiana Tech	Division I	1967	1971	1967	1967	1								
2	Milwaukee (Wisconsin–Milwaukee)	Division I	1960	1989	1989	1989	1	1989	1						
2	Monmouth (IL)	Division III	1957	1974											
2	Monmouth (NJ)	Division I	1981	1982											
2	New Jersey City (Jersey City State)	Division III	1973	1974											
2	Philander Smith	NAIA	1957	1958											
2	Prairie View A&M	Division I	1960	1961	1961	1961	2								
2	RPI	Division III	1958	1973											
2	Towson	Division I	1977	1978	1978	1978	2	1977	1						
2	UC Santa Barbara	Division I	1961	1963	1961	1961	1	1961	1						
2	UMBC	Division I	1979	1980	1980	1980	2	1979	1						
2	UT Martin	Division I	1982	1983	1982	1982	1								
2	West Florida	Division I	2018	2026											
2	Williams	Division III	1959	1961	1961	1961	1	1961	1						
2	Wisconsin–Superior	Division III	1957	1961											
2	Wooster	Division III	1971	1973											
1	Albany	Division I	1969	1969											
1	Alcorn State	Division I	1969	1969	1969	1969	1								
1	Alliance (Nyack)	Defunct	2021	2021											
1	Amherst	Division III	1957	1957											
1	Arkansas–Pine Bluff (Arkansas AM&N)	Division I	1967	1967											
1	Baldwin Wallace	Division III	1967	1967											
1	Ball State	Division I	1964	1964											
1	Bates	Division III	1961	1961	1961	1961	1								
1	Beloit	Division III	1957	1957	1957	1957	1								
1	Benedictine (IL)	Division III	1966	1966											
1	Boise State	Division I	1970	1970											
1	Brandeis	Division III	1958	1958											
1	Brevard	Division III	2010	2010											
1	Catholic	Division III	1964	1964											
1	CCNY	Division III	1957	1957											
1	Central Arkansas	Division I	2005	2005	2005										
1	Centre (KY)	Division III	1964	1964											
1	Denison	Division III	1968	1968											
1	Doane	NAIA	1965	1965											
1	East Tennessee State	Division I	1957	1957	1957	1957	1								
1	Eastern Michigan	Division I	1972	1972	1972	1972	1	1972	1	1972	1				
1	Elizabethtown	Division III	1964	1964	1964	1964	1								
1	Elon	Division I	1997	1997											
1	Fairleigh Dickinson	Division I	1963	1963											
1	Florida Gulf Coast	Division I	2005	2005											
1	Gardner–Webb	Division I	2000	2000											
1	Georgia Southern	Division I	1970	1970	1970	1970	1								
1	Grinnell	Division III	1962	1962											
1	Gustavus Adolphus	Division III	1958	1958											
1	Hamline	Division III	1962	1962											
1	Johns Hopkins	Division III	1974	1974											
1	King's (PA)	Division III	1974	1974											
1	Lebanon Valley	Division III	1973	1973											
1	Long Beach State	Division I	1961	1961	1961	1961	1								
1	Loras	Division III	1959	1959											
1	Loyola (MD)	Division I	1973	1973	1973										
1	Luther (IA)	Division III	1967	1967											
1	MacMurray	Defunct	1961	1961											
1	McNeese	Division I	1968	1968											
1	Mercer	Division I	1972	1972											
1	Muhlenberg	Division III	1968	1968											
1	North Park	Division III	1969	1969											
1	Northern Illinois	Division I	1958	1958											
1	Notre Dame (OH)	Defunct	2019	2019											
1	Ohio Northern	Division III	1974	1974											
1	Pacific (OR)	Division III	1957	1957											
1	Parsons	Defunct	1967	1967											
1	Portland State	Division I	1967	1967											
1	Purdue Fort Wayne (IPFW)	Division I	1993	1993											
1	Rider	Division I	1957	1957	1957	1957	1	1957	1						
1	St. Andrews (St. Andrews Presbyterian)	Defunct	2000	2000											
1	St. Lawrence	Division III	1974	1974											
1	St. Norbert	Division III	1958	1958											
1	Sam Houston	Division I	1986	1986											
1	Seattle	Division I	2007	2007	2007										
1	Siena	Division I	1974	1974	1974										
1	Southampton	Defunct	1972	1972	1972	1972	1	1972	1						
1	Southeastern Louisiana	Division I	1973	1973	1973	1973	1								
1	Stephen F. Austin	Division I	1983	1983											
1	Stony Brook	Division I	1970	1970											
1	SUNY Brockport (Brockport State)	Division III	1973	1973	1973	1973	1	1973	1	1973	1				
1	Upsala	Defunct	1960	1960											
1	USciences	Defunct	2015	2015	2015										
1	UTRGV (UTPA)	Division I	1968	1968	1968										
1	Wesleyan (CT)	Division III	1959	1959											
1	Widener	Division III	1972	1972											
1	Willamette	Division III	1959	1959											
0*	Louisiana (Southwestern Louisiana)	Division I	1971	1971											

== See also ==
- NCAA Division I men's basketball tournament
- NCAA Division III men's basketball tournament
- NAIA men's basketball championship
- NAIA women's basketball championship
- NCAA Division I men's basketball tournament bids by school
- List of NCAA Division III men's basketball tournament bids by school
