= Herb Magee =

American basketball player and coach

Biographical details
- Born: June 21, 1941 (age 84); Philadelphia, Pennsylvania, U.S.

Playing career
- 1960–1963: Philadelphia Textile

Coaching career (HC unless noted)
- 1963–1967: Philadelphia Textile (assistant)
- 1967–2022: Philadelphia Textile/Philadelphia/Jefferson

Head coaching record
- Overall: 1,144–450 (.718)

Accomplishments and honors

Championships
- NCAA College Division II tournament (1970); 5× CACC tournament (2008, 2009, 2014, 2015, 2018); CACC regular season (2007); 6× CACC South Division regular season (2008–2010, 2012, 2014, 2017)
- Basketball Hall of Fame; Inducted in 2011 (profile)
- College Basketball Hall of Fame; Inducted in 2023

Herb Magee (born June 21, 1941), commonly referred to as the Shot Doctor, is an American former men's college basketball coach, who coached for 54 seasons at NCAA Division II Thomas Jefferson University. The school was established in its current form when Philadelphia University, Magee's alma mater, merged with the original Thomas Jefferson University in 2017. The former Philadelphia University was known as Philadelphia College of Textiles & Science and athletically branded as "Philadelphia Shoptile" when Magee first became head coach in 1967, becoming Philadelphia University in 1999. He has spent 54 years as head coach, and 62 years as either a player or coach at the school as of 2021. In 2015, he achieved his 1,000th win as a head coach, becoming one of only four college coaches to achieve that milestone. On August 12, 2011, Magee was inducted into the Naismith Memorial Basketball Hall of Fame.

== Career ==
=== Playing ===
Magee, an Irish American, played his high school basketball at Philadelphia's famed West Catholic High, where his teammates included former Philadelphia 76ers head coach Jim Lynam and former St. Joseph's coach Jim Boyle.

As a five-foot-ten inch, 150-pound player for the Philadelphia Rams, Magee scored 2,235 points (before the introduction of the 3-point shot), leading his team to 75 victories. Magee was a two-time All-American and drafted by the Boston Celtics (the 62nd pick of the 1963 NBA draft). However, he broke his fingers before training camp, and opted instead to return to his alma mater as an assistant coach under Buckey Harris. When Harris retired in 1967, Magee became head coach at the age of 25. He has spent his entire adult life at the East Falls school as either a player, assistant coach, or head coach.

=== Accomplishments ===
Magee has earned many awards during his coaching career. The Kodak District Coach of the Year in 1993, Magee was also tabbed New York Collegiate Athletic Conference Coach of the Year that season and again in 1994. In addition, he has been honored as regional Coach of the Year four times, national Coach of the Year twice, and Co-Coach of the Year in the Mideast Collegiate Conference twice. He was also inducted into the Pennsylvania Sports Hall of Fame in 1979. He led the Rams to the College Division National Championship in 1970.

Coach Magee was inducted into the Philadelphia Sports Hall of Fame (2008), Pennsylvania Sports Hall of Fame (1979), Philadelphia University and West Catholic High School Halls of Fame, and honored by numerous organizations throughout his career. He coached the Olympic Festive team along with John Calipari and was co-coach of the Year in the Mideast Collegiate Conference (twice). The NABC honored him with the Guardian of the Game Award. Coach Magee was awarded the honorary degree Doctor of Humane Letters by President Stephen Spinelli Jr. at Philadelphia University's 125th Commencement on May 17, 2009, in recognition of his accomplishments and years of dedication and service. Known as "shot Doctor" because of his ability to teach basketball shot-making through unforgettable clinics held thousands of times during his career. In one such clinic, he parked his car, entered onto the court and without any warmup, hit 25 in a row from the top of the key.

Magee received a Bachelor of Science in marketing from Philadelphia University in 1963 and a Master's in Education from St. Joseph's University in 1969.

On September 7, 2021, Magee announced that he would retire following the 2021–22 season.

== Personal life ==
Magee has been married twice and has two daughters.

== Head coaching record ==
Record table
Season	Team	Overall	Conference	Standing	Postseason
Philadelphia Textile Rams () (1967–1984)
1967–68	Philadelphia Textile	21–6			NCAA College Division first round
1968–69	Philadelphia Textile	20–5			NCAA College Division first round
1969–70	Philadelphia Textile	29–2			NCAA College Division champions
1970–71	Philadelphia Textile	22–6			NCAA College Division Regional Final
1971–72	Philadelphia Textile	22–7			NCAA College Division Regional Third Place
1972–73	Philadelphia Textile	25–4			NCAA College Division Regional Fourth Place
1973–74	Philadelphia Textile	10–14			
1974–75	Philadelphia Textile	21–6			NCAA Division II Regional Third Place
1975–76	Philadelphia Textile	25–3			NCAA Division II Regional Final
1976–77	Philadelphia Textile	22–6			NCAA Division II Regional Fourth Place
1977–78	Philadelphia Textile	18–10			NCAA Division II Regional Final
1978–79	Philadelphia Textile	20–8			NCAA Division II Regional Fourth Place
1979–80	Philadelphia Textile	13–13			
1980–81	Philadelphia Textile	15–12			
1981–82	Philadelphia Textile	13–14			
1982–83	Philadelphia Textile	23–7			NCAA Division II Regional Final
1983–84	Philadelphia Textile	21–8			
Philadelphia Textile Rams (Mideast Collegiate Conference) (1984–1991)
1984–85	Philadelphia Textile	24–7			NCAA Division II Regional Final
1985–86	Philadelphia Textile	16–14			
1986–87	Philadelphia Textile	16–14			
1987–88	Philadelphia Textile	20–10			
1988–89	Philadelphia Textile	24–7			NCAA Division II Regional Fourth Place
1989–90	Philadelphia Textile	22–8			
1990–91	Philadelphia Textile	24–8			NCAA Division II Quarterfinal
Philadelphia Textile / Philadelphia Rams (New York Collegiate Athletic Conference) (1991–2005)
1991–92	Philadelphia Textile	28–4			NCAA Division II Regional Final
1992–93	Philadelphia Textile	30–2			NCAA Division II Quarterfinal
1993–94	Philadelphia Textile	29–2			NCAA Division II Regional Final
1994–95	Philadelphia Textile	26–5			NCAA Division II Regional Final
1995–96	Philadelphia Textile	19–9			
1996–97	Philadelphia Textile	13–14			
1997–98	Philadelphia Textile	18–10			
1998–99	Philadelphia	21–6			
1999–00	Philadelphia	17–10			
2000–01	Philadelphia	24–7			NCAA Division II Regional semifinal
2001–02	Philadelphia	19–9			
2002–03	Philadelphia	16–12			
2003–04	Philadelphia	26–8			NCAA Division II Regional Quarterfinal
2004–05	Philadelphia	21–9			
Philadelphia/Jefferson Rams (Central Atlantic Collegiate Conference) (2005–2022)
2005–06	Philadelphia	20–11	15–7	2nd	
2006–07	Philadelphia	20–10	14–6	T–1st	NCAA Division II Regional Quarterfinal
2007–08	Philadelphia	22–12	16–0	1st (South)	NCAA Division II Regional Quarterfinal
2008–09	Philadelphia	25–6	14–2	1st (South)	NCAA Division II first round
2009–10	Philadelphia	27–8	16–1	1st (South)	NCAA Division II Regional Final
2010–11	Philadelphia	15–12	10–7	2nd (South)	
2011–12	Philadelphia	19–10	13–4	T–1st (South)	NCAA Division II first round
2012–13	Philadelphia	19–10	12–5	2nd (South)	
2013–14	Philadelphia	25–7	16–3	1st (South)	NCAA Division II first round
2014–15	Philadelphia	24–8	15–4	T–2nd (South)	NCAA Division II first round
2015–16	Philadelphia	23–9	14–5	2nd (South)	NCAA Division II first round
2016–17	Philadelphia	21–9	16–3	1st (South)	
2017–18	Jefferson	21–14	13–6	2nd (South)	NCAA Division II first round
2018–19	Jefferson	22–8	16–3	1st (South)	
2019–20	Jefferson	27–4	18–1	1st (South)	
2020–21	Jefferson	0–0	0–0		Jefferson did not play in 2020–21 due to COVID-19 concerns.
2021–22	Jefferson	21–6	16–2	1st (South)	
Philadelphia Textile / Philadelphia / Jefferson:		1,144–450			
Total:		1,144–450			
National champion Postseason invitational champion Conference regular season champion Conference regular season and conference tournament champion Division regular season champion Division regular season and conference tournament champion Conference tournament champion

== See also ==
- List of college men's basketball career coaching wins leaders
