= Ray Mears (basketball) =

American basketball coach (1926–2007)

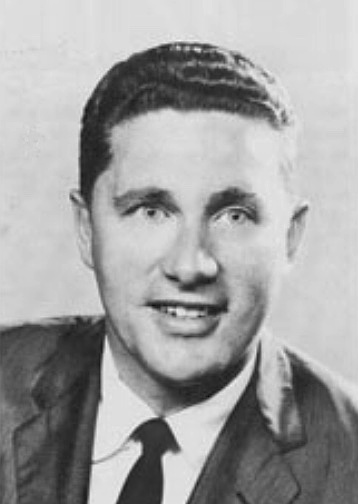
- Mears from the 1967 Volunteer

Biographical details
- Born: November 8, 1926; Dover, Ohio, U.S.
- Died: June 11, 2007 (aged 80); Knoxville, Tennessee, U.S.

Playing career
- 1946–1948: Miami (OH)

Coaching career (HC unless noted)
- 1949–1950: Cadiz HS (OH)
- 1952–1956: West Technical HS (OH)
- 1956–1962: Wittenberg
- 1962–1977: Tennessee

Head coaching record
- Overall: 399–135 (college)
- Tournaments: 7–3 (NCAA College Division); 0–4 (NCAA University Division / Division I 4–2 (NIT); 0–2 (CCA/NCI)

Accomplishments and honors

Championships
- NCAA College Division tournament (1961); 3 OAC regular season (1959–1961); 3 OAC tournament (1960–1962); 3 SEC regular season (1967, 1972, 1977)

Awards
- 2× SEC Coach of the Year (1967, 1977)

Ramon Asa Mears (November 8, 1926 – June 11, 2007) was an American college basketball coach. He served as the head basketball coach at Wittenberg University from 1956 to 1962 and the University of Tennessee from 1962 to 1977. His career record of 399–135 (.747) still ranks among the top 15 all-time NCAA coaching records for those with a minimum of 10 seasons. Mears is largely regarded as the father of Tennessee Volunteers basketball, and was known for his trademark orange blazer, which he wore during games. Mears is also credited with coining the phrase "Big Orange Country." Mears was born in Dover, Ohio and was married to the former Dana Davis. They had three sons: Steve, Mike, and Matt. Ray Mears Boulevard in Knoxville, Tennessee, the city where he died, is named for him.

== Early years ==
Mears played college basketball at Miami University as a walk-on, graduating from there in 1949 with a bachelor's degree in education. He was also a member of the Delta Tau Delta International Fraternity. He earned his master's degree at Kent State University while coaching at West Tech High School in Cleveland, Ohio. He is a member of the Miami University Athletics Hall of Fame and contributed to Miami University's national reputation as the "Cradle of Coaches."

== Coaching start ==
Mears first coached at Cadiz High School in Harrison County, Ohio in 1949, where he doubled as head basketball coach and assistant football coach. In 1950, he left Cadiz for a two-year stint in the United States Army, returning to the head basketball coaching position at West Tech in 1952. That team won the district championship and finished second in the city of Cleveland. Mears spent four successful years at West Tech.

Mears next moved to Wittenberg University in Springfield, Ohio as head basketball coach, assistant football, and head tennis coach. In six seasons at Wittenberg, he led the Tigers to four Ohio Athletic Conference (OAC) titles and a 121–23 record. It was at Wittenberg where Mears developed his reputation as a great teacher of team defense. For three seasons, Wittenberg was ranked No. 1 in defense in the country and produced two first-team All-Americans. In 1960–61, the Tigers won the NCAA College Division basketball tournament. Mears was named the Ohio Coach of the Year in 1960.

== The move to "Big Orange Country" ==
From Wittenberg, the 35-year-old Mears traveled to the University of Tennessee, becoming one of the NCAA's most successful coaches during his 15-year stint there. He compiled three Southeastern Conference championships between 1962 and 1977 and an overall winning percentage of .713. Mears was twice named the SEC Coach of the Year in 1967 and 1977. He coached 12 All-Americans at UT, including NBA stars Bernard King and Ernie Grunfeld.

After King and Grunfeld left in 1977, Mears, who had battled depression for several years, sat out the 1977–78 season. Under the watch of interim coach Cliff Wettig, the Volunteers struggled to an 11–16 record, and Mears officially retired for health reasons after the season.

He retired in 1977 after 21 years of college coaching and a 399–135 record with no losing seasons and a .747 winning percentage. After leaving coaching, he served for 10 years as athletic director at the University of Tennessee at Martin (UT-Martin).

One of the prime achievements of Mears' tenure at Tennessee was the introduction of the phrase "Big Orange Country" to the Volunteer fans. Before his arrival, Tennessee fans almost never wore orange away from the field or court. As an Ohio native, Mears recalled the Steubenville "Big Red" and liked the name and all it implied. The Volunteers, Knoxville, and the rest of the state took the concept to heart.

Indeed, years later, longtime Vols radio voice John Ward said that many of Tennessee's athletic traditions originated with Mears. For instance, the longstanding tradition of the football team running through a "Power T" formed by the Pride of the Southland Band originated with Mears having the basketball team run through a giant "T" as they took the court. He was also responsible for "Rocky Top" becoming Tennessee's de facto secondary fight song.

Mears was also known for his innovative pregame shows. Mears would often, particularly for important away games, walk the perimeter of the floor in his Big Orange sportcoat, both engaging and enraging opposing teams' fans. He also demanded green jello for his pre-game meal. One time before an away game, Mears and the team were eating at a restaurant and the restaurant, as a joke, served Mears orange jello. The coach became quite angry and demanded the restaurant serve him his customary green jello. They did (at great trouble to their staff) and UT narrowly won the game. Afterward, Mears attributed the victory to the green jello.

== Head coaching record ==
Record table
Season	Team	Overall	Conference	Standing	Postseason
Wittenberg Tigers (Ohio Athletic Conference) (1956–1962)
1956–57	Wittenberg	15–6	10–3	3rd	
1957–58	Wittenberg	19–3	14–1	2nd	
1958–59	Wittenberg	19–3	13–1	1st	NCAA College Division Regional Final
1959–60	Wittenberg	22–2	12–0	1st	
1960–61	Wittenberg	25–4	10–0	1st	NCAA College Division Champion
1961–62	Wittenberg	21–5	10–2	2nd	NCAA College Division Quarterfinals
Wittenberg:		121–23	69–7		
Tennessee Volunteers (Southeastern Conference) (1962–1977)
1962–63	Tennessee	13–11	6–8	7th	
1963–64	Tennessee	16–8	9–5	2nd	
1964–65	Tennessee	20–5	12–4	2nd	
1965–66	Tennessee	19–8	10–6	T–3rd	
1966–67	Tennessee	21–7	15–3	1st	NCAA University Division Regional Semifinals
1967–68	Tennessee	20–6	13–5	2nd	
1968–69	Tennessee	21–7	13–5	2nd	NIT Third Place
1969–70	Tennessee	16–9	10–8	5th	
1970–71	Tennessee	21–7	13–5	2nd	NIT quarterfinal
1971–72	Tennessee	19–6	14–4	T–1st	
1972–73	Tennessee	15–9	13–5	T–2nd	
1973–74	Tennessee	17–9	12–6	2nd	CCA first round
1974–75	Tennessee	18–8	12–6	T–3rd	NCI first round
1975–76	Tennessee	21–6	14–4	2nd	NCAA Division I first round
1976–77	Tennessee	22–6	16–2	T–1st	NCAA Division I first round
Tennessee:		278–112	182–76		
Total:		399–135			
National champion Postseason invitational champion Conference regular season champion Conference regular season and conference tournament champion Division regular season champion Division regular season and conference tournament champion Conference tournament champion
