= Evansville Purple Aces =

Sports teams the University of Evansville

- University: University of Evansville
- Nickname: Aces
- NCAA: Division I
- Conference: Missouri Valley Conference
- Athletic director: Dr. Kenneth "Ziggy" Siegfried
- Location: Evansville, Indiana
- Varsity teams: 18
- Basketball arena: Ford Center (men); Meeks Family Fieldhouse at Carson Center (women)
- Baseball stadium: Charles H. Braun Stadium
- Soccer stadium: Arad McCutchan Stadium
- Colors: Purple, white, and orange
- Mascot: Ace Purple
- Website: gopurpleaces.com

The Evansville Purple Aces are the intercollegiate sports teams and players of the University of Evansville, located in Evansville, Indiana. The Aces athletic program is a member of the Missouri Valley Conference and competes at the NCAA's Division I level. Evansville's mascot is Ace Purple, and the school colors are purple, white and orange.

Prior to joining Division I in 1977, the Aces were in the Division II men's basketball championship tournaments 15 of 20 years and won the title in 1959, 1960, 1964, 1965, and 1971.

== Sports sponsored ==
Men's sports	Women's sports
Baseball	Basketball
Basketball	Cross country
Cross country	Golf
Golf	Soccer
Soccer	Softball
Swimming and diving	Swimming and diving
Track and field^{†}	Track and field^{†}
	Volleyball
† – Track and field includes both indoor and outdoor

Moores Hill College moved to Evansville and became Evansville College in 1919. The athletics program was begun with the opening of the new campus.

A member of the Missouri Valley Conference, the University of Evansville sponsors teams in seven men's and nine women's NCAA-sanctioned sports.

=== Baseball ===
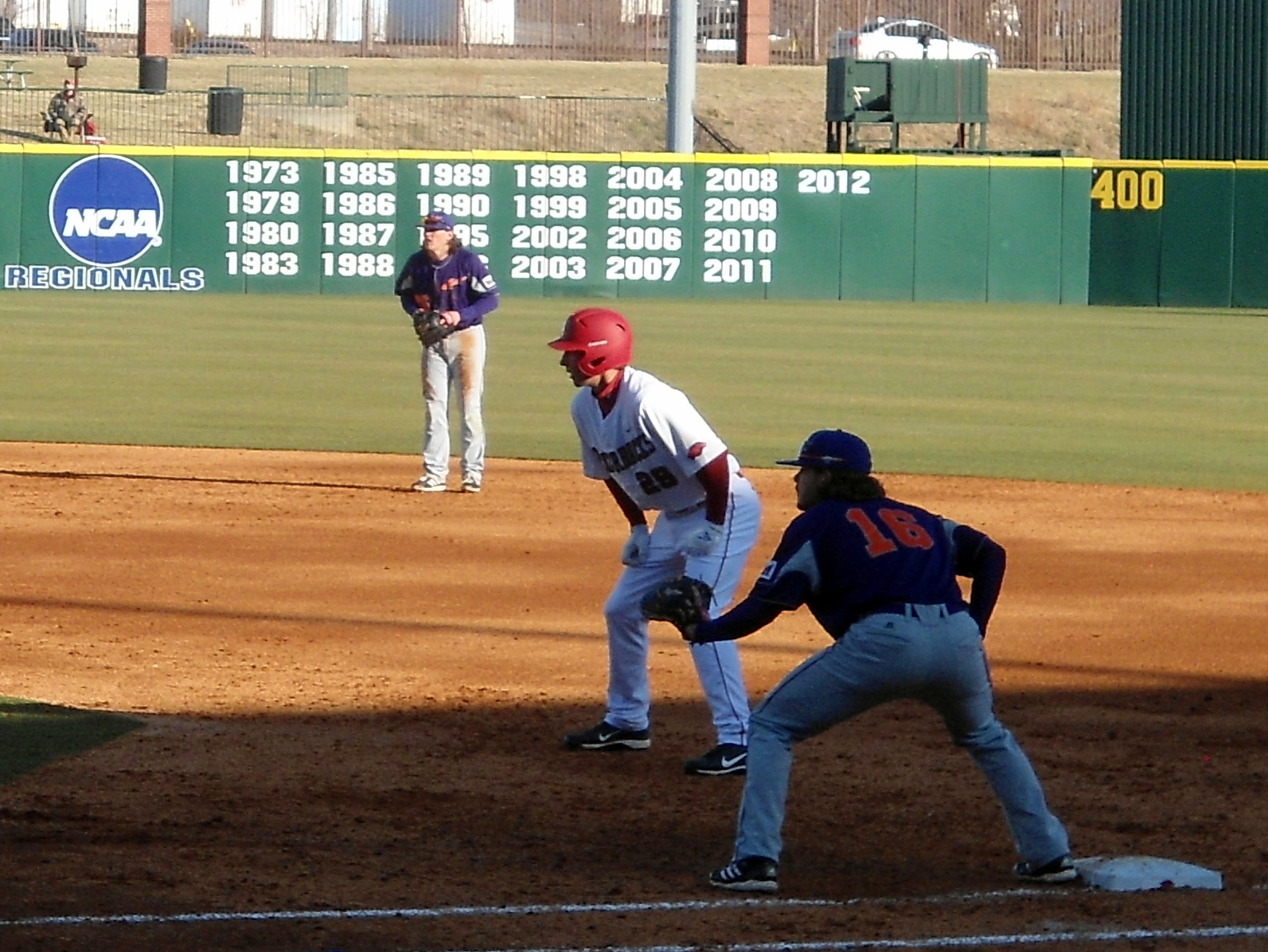
Evansville first baseman John Day holds an Arkansas runner on first base in Baum Stadium.

The first officially sanctioned Evansville College baseball team was formed in 1924. John Harmon was hired as the first head coach of the then-Evansville College Pioneers. Their first game was against Bethel College, which led to a 5–4 Pioneers victory, marking their first in school history.

The Purple Aces have competed in the Missouri Valley Conference since 1995. The Purple Aces play all home games on German American Bank Field at Charles H. Braun Stadium. The team competed in two NCAA Division II baseball tournaments before they started competing in Division I in 1995. Since then they have competed in four NCAA Division I baseball tournaments and have won one regional championship.

Five players from the Purple Aces baseball team have appeared in Major League Baseball: Andy Benes, Sal Fasano, Jamey Carroll, Kyle Freeland, and Rob Maurer.

=== Men's basketball ===
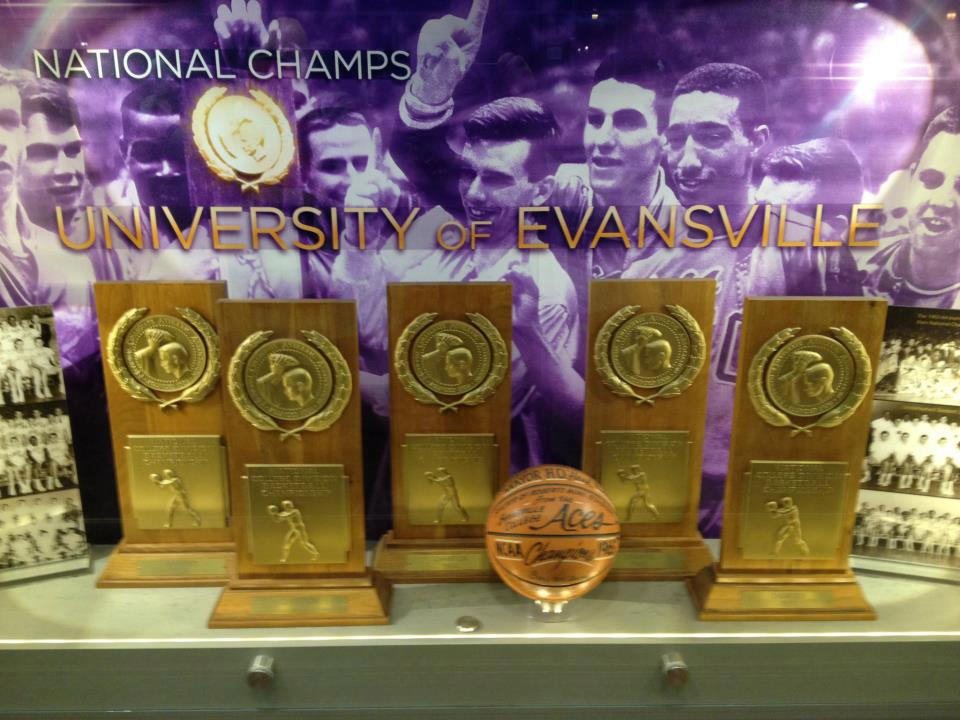
The memorial display case at the Ford Center honoring UE's championship tradition

The University of Evansville athletics department was built upon a foundation of success in men's basketball. In the early years of the men's basketball program the Purple Aces appeared in the NAIA national tournament. The Purple Aces appeared 4 times in the NAIA tournament (1941, 1942, 1951, and 1955). The Purple Aces had a NAIA tournament record of 3–4. The furthest distance Evansville got in the NAIA tournaments was in third round (NAIA quarterfinals) in 1951, only to lose to Regis University (Colo.) 70–68.

Shortly after the 1955 season the Purple Aces would move up to the NCAA College Division, now called NCAA Division II. The Evansville Purple Aces won five national championships in the NCAA College Division: 1959, 1960, 1964, 1965 (29–0 record) and 1971. This ranks second all-time.

In 1977 UE began playing in NCAA Division I athletics. That same year on December 13, a chartered DC-3 carrying the entire UE basketball team crashed in a field near the Evansville Regional Airport en route to a game against Middle Tennessee State. Every member of the team and coaching staff on the plane was killed. Legendary Aces coach Arad McCutchan had retired after the previous season and was not on the plane. McCutchan was the first NCAA College Division coach selected to the Naismith Basketball Hall of Fame. One player was not able to attend the game and thus was not on the plane; not long after the plane crash, however, the player who was not on the plane was killed in a car accident along with his younger brother.

Tremendous community support brought back the basketball program the next year. Brad Leaf played for the Evansville Purple Aces from 1979 to 1982, and was a co-captain in his last year. As a sophomore, he set the then-Evansville season free throw percentage record at 81.1%. In 1981–82, he led the school to its first NCAA Division I tournament. He was the school's first All-American in NCAA Division I. Leaf was 5th in school history in field goals (621), 6th in field goal percentage (52.2%), 7th in points (1,605), and 9th in free throws (363).

Evansville was a charter member of the Midwest Collegiate Conference, now known as the Horizon League. The Aces won or shared the MCC regular season title in 1982, 1987, 1989, 1992, and 1993. They also won the conference tournament title in 1982, 1992, and 1993. The Aces are now a member of the Missouri Valley Conference, and won the 1999 regular season title.

The Purple Aces have made five trips to the NCAA Men's basketball tournament (1982, 1989, 1992, 1993, 1999), two trips to the NIT (1988, 1994), three trips to the CollegeInsider.com (CIT) tournament (2009, 2013, and champions in 2015), and two trips to the College Basketball Invitational (CBI) tournament (2011 and 2012).

On November 12, 2019, the Evansville team took down the #1 ranked University of Kentucky basketball team in UK's home of Rupp Arena, gaining national and global prestige for the upset.

=== Women's basketball ===
The University of Evansville women's basketball team (historically the Lady Aces, though now also known as Purple Aces) have made two trips to the NCAA basketball tournament (1999, 2009).

=== Football ===
The University of Evansville first fielded a football team in 1898. Known early on as the 49ers, Evansville played in the NCAA College Division through 1975, after which they played as an NCAA Division III non-scholarship program. They were champions of the Ohio Valley Conference in 1948 (shared with Morehead State) with a 6–3 (3–1 OVC) record and 1949 with an 8–2–1 (3–1–1 OVC) mark.

Following new NCAA regulations requiring university football and basketball teams to compete at the same division, Evansville became a charter member of the Pioneer Football League (PFL), an NCAA Division I non-scholarship league. They remained PFL members until their shut down following the 1997 season. Citing financial difficulties and a belief that the PFL was not sustainable, the Purple Aces closed the doors on their football program after almost a century on the gridiron. Evansville's all-time record stands at 268–381–26.

Talk has existed since about 2007 about upgrading football again to a fully funded NCAA Division I team, but, after a year of investigation, the board of trustees voted against this in October 2012 as being too expensive.

=== Postseason games ===
Season	Game	Opponent	Result
1948	Refrigerator Bowl	Missouri Valley	W 13–7
1949	Refrigerator Bowl	Hillsdale	W 22–7
1974	NCAA Division III semifinal	Central (IA)	L 16–17

== See also ==
- Sports in Evansville, Indiana
