= Abilene Christian Wildcats men's basketball =

Abilene Christian Wildcats
2026–27 Abilene Christian Wildcats men's basketball team
- University: Abilene Christian University
- Head coach: Brette Tanner (6th season)
- Location: Abilene, Texas
- Arena: Moody Coliseum (capacity: 4,600)
- Conference: UAC
- Nickname: Wildcats
- Colors: Purple and white
- Student section: Wildcat Reign

NCAA Division I tournament round of 32
- 2021

NCAA Division I tournament appearances
- 2019, 2021

NCAA Division II tournament Elite Eight
- 1966
Other NCAA Division II tournament results
Sweet Sixteen	1960, 1964, 1965, 1966, 1999
Appearances	1959, 1960, 1962, 1964, 1965, 1966, 1986, 1987, 1999

Conference tournament champions
- Lone Star: 1985, 1986, 1987; Southland Conference: 2019, 2021

Uniforms
Home	Away

The Abilene Christian Wildcats men's basketball team represents Abilene Christian University (ACU) in Abilene, Texas, United States. The Wildcats joined the United Athletic Conference (UAC) on July 1, 2021, after having spent the previous eight years in the Southland Conference. Before this move, ACU's most recent conference change was in the 2013 offseason, when the Wildcats made the jump to NCAA Division I and rejoined the Southland Conference after a 40-year absence. They are led by head coach Brette Tanner and play their home games at Moody Coliseum.

In 2019, the Wildcats won the Southland Conference and earned their first Division I NCAA Tournament appearance. The Wildcats recorded their first tournament win in 2021, upsetting #3 seeded Texas 53–52.

== Postseason ==
=== NCAA Division I Tournament results ===
The Wildcats have appeared in the NCAA Division I tournament twice. Their record is 1–2.

Year	Seed	Round	Opponent	Result
2019	#15	First Round	#2 Kentucky	L 44–79
2021	#14	First Round; Second Round	#3 Texas #11 UCLA	W 53–52; L 47–67

=== NCAA Division II Tournament results ===
The Wildcats have appeared in the NCAA Division II tournament nine times. Their combined record is 9–11.

Year	Round	Opponent	Result
1959	Regional semifinals Regional 3rd-place game	Southwest Missouri State; Western Illinois	L 67–87; W 85–81 ^{OT}
1960	Regional semifinals Regional Finals	Colorado College; Northeast Missouri State	W 109–65; L 76–79
1962	Regional semifinals Regional 3rd-place game	Southeast Missouri State; Lamar Tech	L 55–57; L 74–83
1964	Regional semifinals Regional Finals	Lamar Tech; Southeast Missouri State	W 73–71; L 87–90
1965	Regional semifinals Regional Finals	Doane; Washington (MO)	W 91–50; L 66–69
1966	Regional semifinals Regional Finals; Elite Eight	Jackson State; Southwest Missouri State; North Dakota	W 94–79; W 63–58; L 62–63
1986	Regional semifinals Regional 3rd-place game	Southwest Missouri State; Sam Houston State	L 72–94; W 76–60
1987	Regional semifinals Regional 3rd-place game	Delta State; West Texas State	L 71–88; L 63–67
1999	Regional Quarterfinals; Regional semifinals Regional Finals	West Texas A&M; Pittsburg State; Truman State	W 102–96 ^{3OT} W 79–59; L 69–76

=== CBI results ===
The Wildcats have appeared in the College Basketball Invitational (CBI) one time. Their record is 2–1.

Year	Seed	Round	Opponent	Result
2022	#6	First round Quarterfinals; Semifinals	#11 Troy #3 Ohio #2 Middle Tennessee	W 82–70; W 91–86; L 69–85

=== CIT results ===
The Wildcats have appeared in the CollegeInsider.com Postseason Tournament (CIT) two times. Their record is 1–2.

Year	Round	Opponent	Result
2018	First round	Drake	L 73–80 ^{OT}
2024	First round Quarterfinals	Texas A&M–Corpus Christi; Tarleton	W 73–63; L 59–86
