= 1974 NCAA Division II basketball tournament =

- Teams: 44
- Finals site: , Evansville, Indiana
- Champions: Morgan State Bears (1st title)
- Runner-up: SW Missouri State Bears (4th title game)
- Semifinalists: Assumption Greyhounds (2nd Final Four); New Orleans Privateers (1st Final Four)
- Winning coach: Nat Frazier (1st title)
- MOP: Marvin Webster (Morgan State)
- Attendance: 14,207

The 1974 NCAA Division II basketball tournament involved 44 schools playing in a single-elimination tournament to determine the national champion of men's NCAA Division II college basketball as a culmination of the 1973–74 NCAA Division II men's basketball season. It was won by Morgan State University and Morgan State's Marvin Webster was the Most Outstanding Player.

This was the first tournament to be officially designated as a Division II basketball championship. The NCAA first split into competitive divisions for the 1956–57 school year, creating the top-level University Division and second-tier College Division. Effective with the 1973–74 school year, the NCAA adopted the three-division system that exists to this day. The University Division was renamed Division I, while the College Division was split into Division II and the non-scholarship Division III. Since the Division III basketball tournament would not be played until 1975, the 1974 Division II tournament included Division III teams despite the name.

1974 NCAA Division II Men's sites - first round (white) regionals (cyan) Elite Eight (red)

}

== Regional participants ==
School	Outcome
Miles	Fifth Place*
Norfolk State	Regional Champion
Old Dominion	Runner-up
Randolph–Macon	Fifth Place*
Roanoke	Third Place
Rollins	Fourth Place

School	Outcome
Assumption	Regional Champion
Bentley	Fourth Place
Hartford	Runner-up
St. Michael's	Third Place

School	Outcome
Hartwick	Runner-up
Morgan State	Regional Champion
New Jersey City	Fifth Place*
Potsdam State	Fourth Place
Siena	Third Place
St. Lawrence	Fifth Place*

School	Outcome
Albright	Runner-up
Bloomsburg	Regional Champion
Hiram	Fourth Place
Johns Hopkins	Fifth Place*
King's (PA)	Third Place
Ohio Northern	Fifth Place*

School	Outcome
Chicago	Fifth Place*
Coe	Fifth Place*
Evansville	Third Place
Wisconsin–Green Bay	Fourth Place
St. Joseph's (IN)	Regional Champion
Wittenberg	Runner-up

School	Outcome
Kentucky Wesleyan	Runner-up
Monmouth (IL)	Fifth Place*
North Dakota	Third Place
North Dakota State	Fifth Place*
St. Cloud State	Fourth Place
SW Missouri State	Regional Champion

School	Outcome
Fisk	Runner-up
Madison	Fifth Place
New Orleans	Regional Champion
Southern	Fourth Place
Tennessee State	Third Place

School	Outcome
Cal Poly	Third Place
Chico State	Fourth Place
San Diego	Fifth Place
Sonoma State	Runner-up
UC Riverside	Regional Champion

*denotes tie

== Regionals ==
=== South Atlantic – Norfolk, Virginia ===
Location: Norfolk Scope Host: Old Dominion University

First round – Norfolk, VA; Round of 44; March 5
Norfolk State	74
Randolph-Macon	72

First round – Winter Park, FL; Round of 44; March 5
Rollins	76
Miles	67

Regional semifinals Round of 32; March 8
Roanoke	75
Norfolk State	84
Rollins	77
Old Dominion	80

Regional Final; Sweet 16; March 9
Norfolk State	89
Old Dominion	76

- Third Place – Roanoke 88, Rollins 77

=== New England – Waltham, Massachusetts ===
Location: Dana Center Host: Bentley College

Regional semifinals Round of 32; March 8
Hartford	102
St. Michael's	93
Assumption	85
Bentley	83

Regional Final; Sweet 16; March 9
Hartford	68
Assumption	84

- Third Place – St. Michael's 95, Bentley 91

=== East – Canton, New York ===
Location: Burkman Gymnasium Host: Saint Lawrence University

First round – Canton, NY; Round of 44; March 5
Potsdam State	65
St. Lawrence	49

First round – Albany, NY; Round of 44; March 4
Siena	87
New Jersey City	64

Regional semifinals Round of 32; March 8
Morgan State	54
Potsdam State	43
Siena	72
Hartwick	81

Regional Final; Sweet 16; March 9
Morgan State	68
Hartwick	64

- Third Place – Siena 82, Potsdam State 74

=== Mideast – Reading, Pennsylvania ===
Location: Bollman Center Host: Albright College

First round – Chester, PA; Round of 44; March 5
Bloomsburg	78
Johns Hopkins	63

First round – Hiram, OH; Round of 44; March 5
Hiram	56
Ohio Northern	50

Regional semifinals Round of 32; March 8
King's (PA)	65
Bloomsburg	66
Hiram	79
Albright	93

Regional Final; Sweet 16; March 9
Bloomsburg	92
Albright	78

- Third Place – King's 111, Hiram 81

=== Great Lakes – Evansville, Indiana ===
Location: Roberts Municipal Stadium Host: University of Evansville

First round – Rensselaer, IN; Round of 44; March 5
St. Joseph's (IN)	91
Coe	76

First round – Springfield, OH; Round of 44; March 5
Wittenberg	82
Chicago	58

Regional semifinals Round of 32; March 8
UW–Green Bay	54
St. Joseph's	70
Wittenberg	59*
Evansville	55

Regional Final; Sweet 16; March 9
St. Joseph's	75
Wittenberg	60

- Third Place – Evansville 87, Wisconsin–Green Bay 75

=== Midwest – Springfield, Missouri ===
Location: Hammons Center Host: Southwest Missouri State University

First round – St. Cloud, MN; Round of 44; March 5
St. Cloud State	77
North Dakota State	62

First round – Grand Forks, ND; Round of 44; March 5
North Dakota	73
Monmouth (IL)	67

Regional semifinals Round of 32; March 8
Kentucky Wesleyan	74
St. Cloud State	72
North Dakota	63
SW Missouri State	71

Regional Final; Sweet 16; March 9
Kentucky Wesleyan	66
SW Missouri State	69

- Third Place – North Dakota 75, St. Cloud State 71

=== South – Nashville, Tennessee ===
Location: Kean Hall Host: Tennessee State University

First round Round of 44; March 5
Fisk	59
Madison	54

Regional semifinals Round of 32; March 8
Tennessee State	54
Fisk	65
New Orleans	85
Southern	80

Regional Final; Sweet 16; March 9
Fisk	63
New Orleans	78

- Third Place – Tennessee State 98, Southern 88

=== West – San Luis Obispo, California ===
Location: Mott Gym Host: California Polytechnic State University, San Luis Obispo

First round Round of 44; March 5
Sonoma State	60
San Diego	54

Regional semifinals Round of 32; March 8
Cal Poly	66
Sonoma State	73
UC Riverside	62
Chico State	51

Regional Final; Sweet 16; March 9
Sonoma State	56
UC Riverside	71

- Third Place – Cal Poly 81, Chico State 63

*denotes each overtime played

== National Finals – Evansville, Indiana ==
Location: Roberts Municipal Stadium Host: University of Evansville

National Quarterfinals; Elite Eight; March 13
Norfolk State	79
Assumption	89
Morgan State	71
Bloomsburg	57
St. Joseph's (IN)	78
SW Missouri State	80
New Orleans	83
UC Riverside	78

National semifinals Final Four; March 14
Assumption	70
Morgan State	73
SW Missouri State	68
New Orleans	63

National Championship; March 15
Morgan State	67
SW Missouri State	52

- Third Place – Assumption 115, New Orleans 103

*denotes each overtime played

== All-tournament team ==
- William Doolittle (Southwest Missouri State)
- John Grochowski (Assumption)
- Randy Magers (Southwest Missouri State)
- Alvin O'Neal (Morgan State)
- Marvin Webster (Morgan State)

== See also ==
- 1974 NCAA Division I basketball tournament
- 1974 NAIA Basketball Tournament

== Sources ==
- 2010 NCAA Men's Basketball Championship Tournament Records and Statistics: Division II men's basketball Championship
- 1974 NCAA Division II men's basketball tournament jonfmorse.com
