= South Carolina State Bulldogs basketball =

2026–27 South Carolina State Bulldogs basketball team
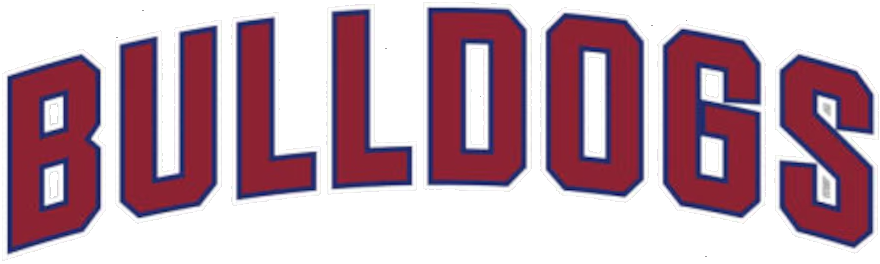
- University: South Carolina State University
- Head coach: Erik Martin (5th season)
- Location: Orangeburg, South Carolina
- Arena: SHM Memorial Center (capacity: 3,200)
- Conference: MEAC
- Nickname: Bulldogs
- Colors: Garnet and blue

NCAA Division I tournament appearances
- NCAA Division II; 1958, 1961, 1963, 1966, 1967 NCAA Division I 1989, 1996, 1998, 2000, 2003

Conference tournament champions
- SIAC; 1943, 1964, 1966 MEAC; 1989, 1996, 1998, 2000, 2003

Conference regular-season champions
- 1977, 1989, 1996, 1999, 2000, 2003, 2004, 2025

The South Carolina State Bulldogs men's basketball team is the basketball team that represents South Carolina State University in Orangeburg, South Carolina, United States. The school's team currently competes in the Mid-Eastern Athletic Conference. The Bulldogs have appeared five times in the NCAA tournament, most recently in 2003. South Carolina State has never won a game at the NCAA tournament.

== Postseason results ==
=== NCAA Division I tournament results ===
The Bulldogs have appeared in the NCAA Division I Tournament five times. Their combined record is 0–5.

Year	Seed	Round	Opponent	Result
1989	#15	First round	#2 Duke	L 69–90
1996	#15	First round	#2 Kansas	L 54–92
1998	#15	First round	#2 Kentucky	L 67–82
2000	#16	First round	#1 Stanford	L 65–84
2003	#16	First round	#1 Oklahoma	L 54–71

=== NCAA Division II tournament results ===
The Bulldogs have appeared in the NCAA Division II Tournament five times. Their combined record is 3–7.

Year	Round	Opponent	Result
1958	Regional semifinals Regional 3rd-place game	Grambling State; Philader Smith	L 79–104; W 80–70
1961	Regional semifinals Regional 3rd-place game	Wabash; Youngstown State	L 83–94; L 82–96
1963	Regional semifinals Regional Finals	Buffalo; Wittenburg	W 80–63; L 63–70
1966	Regional semifinals Regional 3rd-place game	Kentucky Wesleyan; Winston-Salem State	L 73–81 ^{OT} L 81–85
1967	Regional semifinals Regional 3rd-place game	Tennessee State; Kentucky Wesleyan	W 66–59; L 70–87

=== CIT results ===
The Bulldogs have appeared in one CollegeInsider.com Postseason Tournament in 2016. Their record is 0–1.

Year	Round	Opponent	Result
2016	First round	Grand Canyon	L 74–78

=== NAIA results ===
The Bulldogs have appeared in one NAIA Tournament (NAIA). Their NAIA record is 1–1.

Year	Round	Opponent	Result
1973	First round	Hastings College (Neb.); Guilford	W 82–71; L 81–98
