= 1958 NCAA College Division basketball tournament =

Edition of USA college basketball tournament

- Teams: 32
- Finals site: Roberts Municipal Stadium, Evansville, Indiana
- Champions: South Dakota Coyotes (1st title)
- Runner-up: St. Michael's Purple Knights (1st title game)
- Semifinalists: Evansville Purple Aces (1st Final Four); Wheaton Thunder (2nd Final Four)
- Winning coach: Dwane Clodfelter (1st title)
- MOP: Ed Smallwood (Evansville)
- Attendance: 16,007

The 1958 NCAA College Division basketball tournament involved 32 schools playing in a single-elimination tournament to determine the national champion of men's basketball in the NCAA College Division, predecessor to today's NCAA Divisions II and III, as a culmination of the 1957–58 NCAA College Division men's basketball season. It was won by the University of South Dakota, and Ed Smallwood of the University of Evansville was named the Most Outstanding Player.

1958 NCAA Division II Men's sites - regionals (cyan) Elite Eight (red)

== Regional participants ==
School	Outcome
Adelphi	Runner-up
Brandeis	Third Place
RPI	Fourth Place
St. Michael's	Regional Champion

School	Outcome
Grambling	Regional Champion
North Carolina A&T	Runner-up
Philander Smith	Fourth Place
South Carolina State	Third Place

School	Outcome
American	Regional Champion
Buffalo	Third Place
Philadelphia Textile	Fourth Place
Wagner	Runner-up

School	Outcome
Akron	Runner-up
Austin Peay	Fourth Place
Evansville	Regional Champion
Wabash	Third Place

School	Outcome
Hope	Runner-up
Northern Illinois	Third Place
St. Norbert	Fourth Place
Wheaton (IL)	Regional Champion

School	Outcome
Chico State	Third Place
Chapman	Regional Champion
Fresno State	Runner-up
Linfield	Fourth Place

School	Outcome
Arkansas State	Third Place
Centenary (LA)	Fourth Place
Regis (CO)	Runner-up
SW Missouri State	Regional Champion

School	Outcome
Gustavus Adolphus	Fourth Place
Knox	Runner-up
South Dakota	Regional Champion
Wartburg	Third Place

== Regionals ==
=== Northeast - Waltham, Massachusetts ===
Location: Shapiro Gym Host: Brandeis University

Regional semifinals Round of 32; March 7
Adelphi	90
Brandeis	72
St. Michael's	72
RPI	56

Regional final Sweet 16; March 8
Adelphi	58
St. Michael's	97

- Third Place - Brandeis 71, RPI 69

=== South Central - Grambling, Louisiana ===
Location: Tiger Memorial Gym Host: Grambling College

Regional semifinals Round of 32; March 7
Grambling	104
South Carolina State	79
North Carolina A&T	68
Philander Smith	64

Regional final Sweet 16; March 8
Grambling	88
North Carolina A&T	73

- Third Place - South Carolina State 80, Philander Smith 70

=== East - Staten Island, New York ===
Location: Sutter Gym Host: Wagner College

Regional semifinals Round of 32; March 7
Wagner	94
Philadelphia Textile	77
American	77
Buffalo	60

Regional final Sweet 16; March 8
Wagner	65
American	72

- Third Place - Buffalo 77, Philadelphia Textile 73

=== Mideast - Evansville, Indiana ===
Location: Roberts Municipal Stadium Host: Evansville College

Regional semifinals Round of 32; March 6
Evansville*	70
Wabash	68
Akron	76
Austin Peay	61

Regional final Sweet 16; March 7
Evansville	82
Akron	70

- Third Place - Wabash 72, Austin Peay 69

=== Great Lakes - Aurora, Illinois ===
Location: Aurora East High School Gym Host: Wheaton College

Regional semifinals Round of 32; March 7
Wheaton (IL)	68
St. Norbert	66
Hope	101
Northern Illinois	95

Regional final Sweet 16; March 8
Wheaton	104
Hope	93

- Third Place - St. Norbert 76, Northern Illinois 70

=== Pacific Coast - Santa Ana, California ===
Location: Cook Gymnasium Host: Chapman College

Regional semifinals Round of 32; March 7
Fresno State	69
Chico State	56
Chapman	78
Linfield	57

Regional final Sweet 16; March 8
Fresno State	49
Chapman	52

- Third Place - Chico State 76, Linfield 62

=== Southwest - Springfield, Missouri ===
Location: McDonald Hall and Arena Host: Southwest Missouri State College

Regional semifinals Round of 32; March 7
SW Missouri State	74
Centenary (LA)	69
Regis (CO)	48
Arkansas State	47

Regional final Sweet 16; March 8
SW Missouri State	73
Regis	65

- Third Place - Arkansas State 83, Centenary 70

=== Midwest - Vermillion, South Dakota ===
Location: South Dakota Armory Host: University of South Dakota

Regional semifinals Round of 32; March 7
South Dakota	67
Wartburg	65
Knox	76
Gustavus Adolphus	65

Regional final Sweet 16; March 8
South Dakota	102
Knox	51

- Third Place - Wartburg 83, Gustavus Adolphus 73

*denotes each overtime played

== National Finals - Evansville, Indiana ==
Location: Roberts Municipal Stadium Host: Evansville College

National Quarterfinals; Elite Eight; March 12
St. Michael's	84
Grambling	76
American	72
Evansville	82
Wheaton	81
Chapman	64
SW Missouri State	58
South Dakota	63

National semifinals Final Four; March 13
St Michael's	78
Evansville	70
Wheaton	60
South Dakota	64

National championship March 14
St. Michael's	53
South Dakota	75

- Third Place - Evansville 95, Wheaton 93

*denotes each overtime played

== All-tournament team ==
- Jim Browne (Saint Michael's)
- Jim Daniels (South Dakota)
- Mel Peterson (Wheaton)
- Ed Smallwood (Evansville)
- Dick Zeitler (Saint Michael's)

== See also ==
- 1958 NCAA University Division basketball tournament
- 1958 NAIA Basketball Tournament

== Sources ==
- 2010 NCAA Men's Basketball Championship Tournament Records and Statistics: Division II men's basketball Championship
- 1958 NCAA College Division Men's Basketball Tournament jonfmorse.com
