= Evansville Purple Aces men's basketball =

American college basketball team

2026–27 Evansville Purple Aces men's basketball team
- University: University of Evansville
- Head coach: David Ragland (5th season)
- Location: Evansville, Indiana
- Arena: Ford Center (capacity: 10,000)
- Conference: Missouri Valley
- Nickname: Purple Aces
- Colors: Purple, white, and orange

NCAA Division I tournament champions
- 1959*, 1960*, 1964*, 1965*, 1971*
Other NCAA Division I tournament results
Final Four	1958*, 1959*, 1960*, 1964*, 1965*, 1971*
Elite Eight	1958*, 1959*, 1960*, 1963*, 1964*, 1965*, 1968*, 1971*
Sweet Sixteen	1957*, 1958*, 1959*, 1960*, 1962*, 1963*, 1964*, 1965*, 1966*, 1968*, 1971*, 1972*, 1976*
Appearances	1957*, 1958*, 1959*, 1960*, 1961*, 1962*, 1963*, 1964*, 1965*, 1966*, 1968*, 1971*, 1972*, 1974*, 1976*, 1982, 1989, 1992, 1993, 1999

Conference tournament champions
- Midwestern Collegiate Conference; 1982, 1992, 1993

Conference regular-season champions
- Midwestern Collegiate Conference; 1982, 1987, 1989, 1992, 1993 Missouri Valley Conference; 1999

Uniforms
Home	Away	Alternate
- * at Division II level

The Evansville Purple Aces men's basketball team represents the Purple Aces of the University of Evansville, located in Evansville, Indiana, in NCAA Division I basketball competition. They play their home games at the Ford Center. Evansville's athletics teams were originally known as the Pioneers in the early part of the 1900s. In the 1920s, the name Aces arose after a local sports writer wrote in a game story of the men's basketball team, "They played like Aces." The team has been known as the Aces and/or Purple Aces ever since. Evansville has won five Division II national championships (1959, 1960, 1964, 1965, 1971).

On November 12, 2019, the Aces earned one of the biggest victories in their Division I history, upsetting top-ranked Kentucky at Rupp Arena. Since joining Division I in 1977-78, the Purple Aces have appeared in five NCAA tournaments, making their most recent appearance in 1999. In 1989, Evansville upset Oregon State and advanced to the Round of 32 of the 1989 NCAA tournament.

== History ==
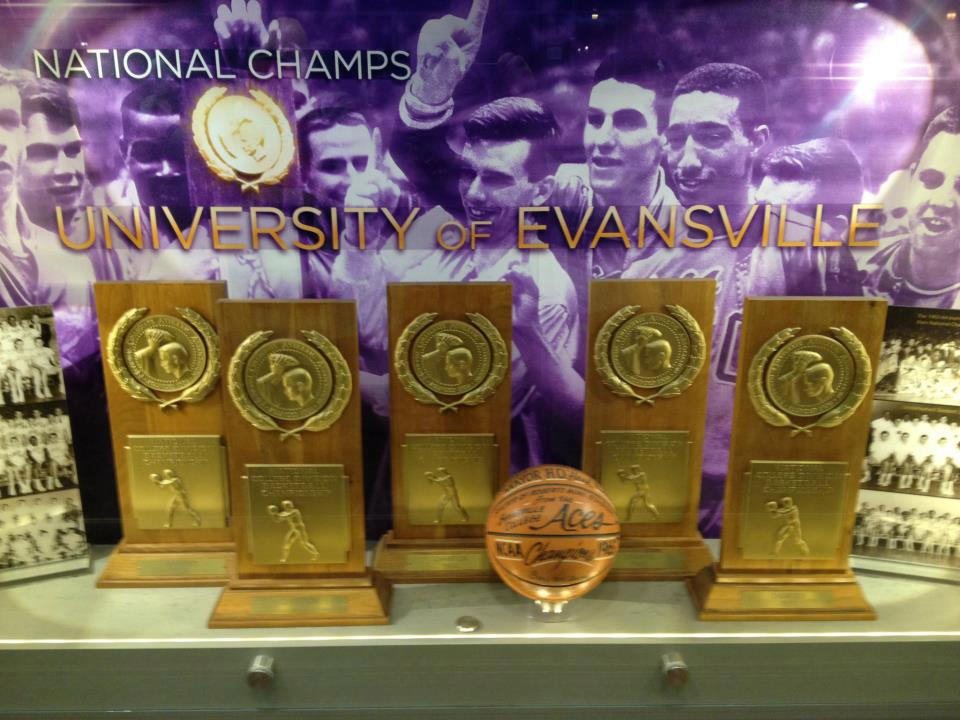
The memorial display case at the Ford Center honoring UE's championship tradition

In the early years of the men's basketball program the Purple Aces appeared in the NAIA national tournament. The Purple Aces appeared 4 times in the NAIA Tournament (1941, 1942, 1951, and 1955). The Purple Aces had a NAIA tournament record of 3–4. The furthest Evansville got in the NAIA tournaments was in third round (NAIA Quarterfinals) in 1951, only to lose to Regis University (Colo.) 70–68.

Shortly after the 1955 season the Purple Aces moved up to the NCAA College Division, now called NCAA Division II. The Evansville Purple Aces rank second all-time in NCAA College Division national championships with five: 1959, 1960, 1964, 1965 (29–0 record) and 1971. The 1964 and 1965 teams starred NBA Legend Jerry Sloan, the 1971 team featured future NBA star Don Buse and future NCAA referee Steve Welmer.

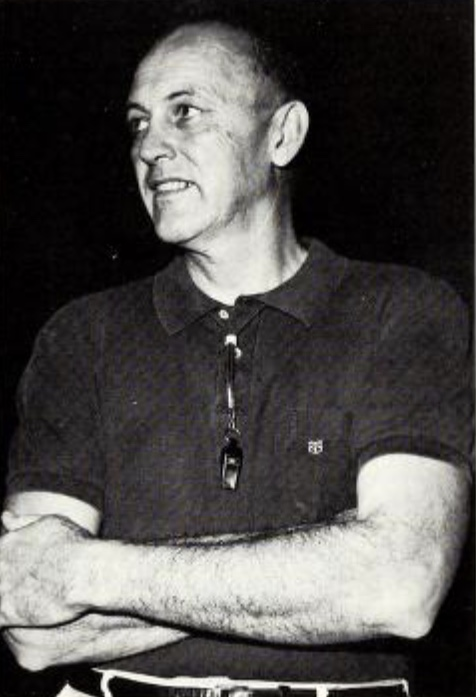
Coach Arad McCutchan won five national championships in his tenure.

In 1977, UE began playing in NCAA Division I athletics. That same year on December 13, a chartered DC-3 carrying the entire UE basketball team crashed in a field near the Evansville Regional Airport en route to a game against Middle Tennessee State. Every member of the team and coaching staff on the plane was killed. David Furr, who was a member of the 1977–78 Purple Aces squad, did not die in the crash, as he was out for the season with an ankle injury and thus was not on the plane that day. However, only just two weeks later after the crash, Furr and his younger brother Byron were killed in a car accident near Newton, Illinois, leaving the entire 1977–78 Purple Aces team dead.

Tremendous community support brought back the basketball program the next year. Evansville was a charter member of the Midwest Collegiate Conference, now known as the Horizon League. The Aces won or shared the MCC regular season title in 1982, 1987, 1989, 1992, and 1993. They also won the conference tournament title in 1982, 1992, and 1993. The Aces are now a member of the Missouri Valley Conference, and won the 1999 regular season title.

Legendary Aces coach Arad McCutchan was the first NCAA College Division coach selected to the Naismith Basketball Hall of Fame.

The Purple Aces have made five trips to the NCAA Men's basketball tournament (1982, 1989, 1992, 1993, 1999) and two trips to the NIT (1988, 1994).

== Seasonal records ==
Season	Team	W	L	PCT	Conf. record	Postseason	Head coach
Independent
1977–78	Evansville	1	3	.250			Bobby Watson
1978–79	Evansville	13	16	.448			Dick Walters
Midwestern Collegiate Conference
1979–80	Evansville	18	10	.643	1–4		Dick Walters
1980–81	Evansville	19	9	.679	6–5		Dick Walters
1981–82	Evansville	23	6	.793	10–2	NCAA first round	Dick Walters
1982–83	Evansville	13	16	.448	6–8		Dick Walters
1983–84	Evansville	15	14	.517	7–7		Dick Walters
1984–85	Evansville	13	16	.448	4–10		Dick Walters
1985–86	Evansville	8	19	.296	3–9		Jim Crews
1986–87	Evansville	16	12	.571	8–4		Jim Crews
1987–88	Evansville	21	8	.724	6–4	NIT Sweet Sixteen	Jim Crews
1988–89	Evansville	25	6	.806	10–2	NCAA Second Round	Jim Crews
1989–90	Evansville	17	15	.531	8–6		Jim Crews
1990–91	Evansville	14	14	.500	7–7		Jim Crews
1991–92	Evansville	24	6	.800	8–2	NCAA first round	Jim Crews
1992–93	Evansville	23	7	.767	12–2	NCAA first round	Jim Crews
1993–94	Evansville	21	11	.656	6–4	NIT first round	Jim Crews
Missouri Valley Conference
1994–95	Evansville	18	9	.667	11–7		Jim Crews
1995–96	Evansville	13	14	.481	9–9		Jim Crews
1996–97	Evansville	17	14	.548	11–7		Jim Crews
1997–98	Evansville	15	15	.500	9–9		Jim Crews
1998–99	Evansville	23	10	.697	13–5	NCAA first round	Jim Crews
1999–2000	Evansville	18	12	.600	9–9		Jim Crews
2000–01	Evansville	14	16	.467	9–9		Jim Crews
2001–02	Evansville	7	21	.250	4–14		Jim Crews
2002–03	Evansville	12	16	.429	8–10		Steve Merfeld
2003–04	Evansville	7	22	.241	5–13		Steve Merfeld
2004–05	Evansville	11	17	.393	5–13		Steve Merfeld
2005–06	Evansville	10	19	.345	5–13		Steve Merfeld
2006–07	Evansville	14	17	.452	6–12		Steve Merfeld
2007–08	Evansville	9	21	.300	3–15		Marty Simmons
2008–09	Evansville	17	14	.548	8–10	CIT first round	Marty Simmons
2009–10	Evansville	9	21	.300	3–15		Marty Simmons
2010–11	Evansville	16	16	.500	9–9	CBI Second Round	Marty Simmons
2011–12	Evansville	16	15	.516	9–9	CBI first round	Marty Simmons
2012–13	Evansville	21	15	.583	10–8	CIT Semifinals	Marty Simmons
2013–14	Evansville	14	19	.424	6–12		Marty Simmons
2014–15	Evansville	24	12	.613	9–9	CIT Champions	Marty Simmons
2015–16	Evansville	25	9	.735	12–6		Marty Simmons
2016–17	Evansville	16	17	.485	6–12		Marty Simmons
2017–18	Evansville	17	15	.531	7–11		Marty Simmons
2018–19	Evansville	11	21	.343	5–13		Walter McCarty
2019–20	Evansville	9	23	.281	0–18		Walter McCarty; Todd Lickliter
2020–21	Evansville	9	16	.360	7–11		Todd Lickliter
2021–22	Evansville	6	24	.360	2–16		Todd Lickliter
2022–23	Evansville	5	27	.185	1–19		David Ragland
Totals		672	633	.517			

== Postseason results ==
=== Division I NCAA tournament results ===
The Purple Aces have appeared in five NCAA Division I Tournaments. Their combined record is 1–5.

Year	Round	Opponent	Result
1982	First round	Marquette	L 62–67
1989	First round Second Round	Oregon State; Seton Hall	W 94–90 ^{OT} L 73–87
1992	First round	UTEP	L 50–55
1993	First round	Florida State	L 70–82
1999	First round	Kansas	L 74–95

=== Division II NCAA tournament results ===
The Purple Aces have appeared in 14 NCAA Division II Tournaments. Their combined record is 39–9. They are five time national champions (1959, 1960, 1964, 1965, 1971).

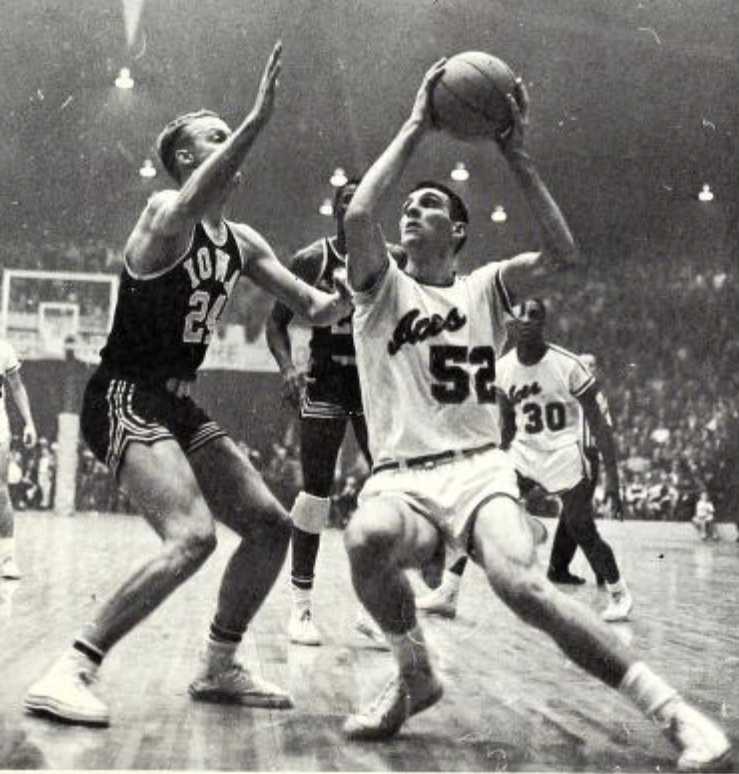
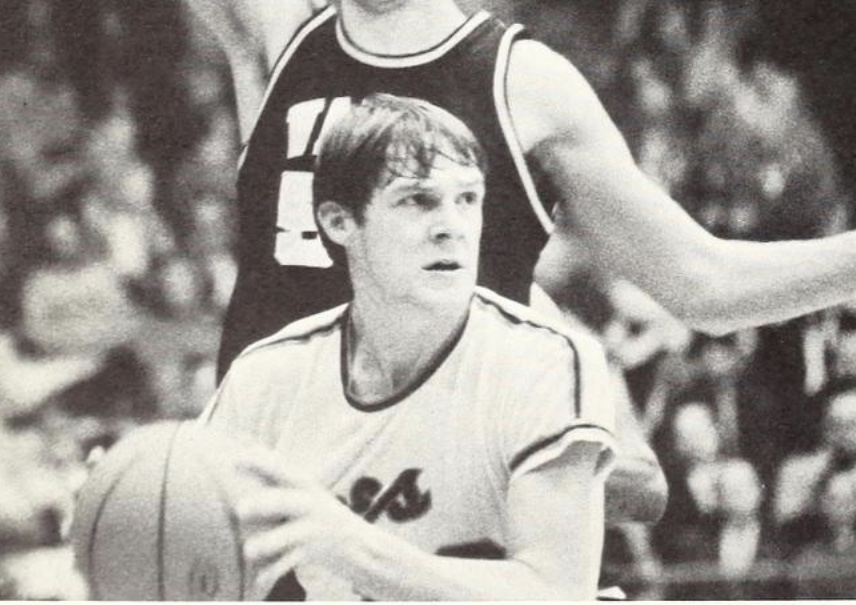
Jerry Sloan (top) and Don Buse (bottom) won a combined three national championships.

Year	Round	Opponent	Result
1957	Regional Seminfinals; Regional Finals	Illinois State; Buffalo	W 108–96; L 75–77
1958	Regional semifinals Regional Finals; Elite Eight; Final Four; National 3rd-place game	Wabash; Akron; American; St Michael's; Wheaton	W 70–68 ^{OT} W 82–70; W 82–72; L 70–78; W 95–93
1959	Regional semifinals Regional Finals; Elite Eight; Final Four; National Championship Game	Belmont Abbey; Wittenberg; St. Michael's; North Carolina A&T; SW Missouri State	W 66–54; W 56–50; W 82–63; W 110–92; W 83–67
1960	Regional semifinals Regional Finals; Elite Eight; Final Four; National Championship Game	Arkansas State; Wabush; American; Kentucky Wesleyan; Chapman	W 91–74; W 89–68; W 101–91; W 76–69; W 90–69
1961	Regional Seminfinals; Regional 3rd-place game	Lincoln (MO); MacMurray	L 90–77; W 98–97 ^{OT}
1962	Regional Seminfinals; Regional Finals	North Carolina A&T; Southern Illinois	W 97–82; L 83–88
1963	Regional Seminfinals; Regional Finals; Elite Eight	Concordia (IL); Washington-St. Louis; Southern Illinois	W 66–56; W 85–76; L 73–86
1964	Regional semifinals Regional Finals; Elite Eight; Final Four; National Championship Game	Jackson State; Southern Illinois; Cal Poly Pomona; Northern Iowa; Akron	W 97–69; W 64–59; W 95–73; W 82–67; W 72–59
1965	Regional semifinals Regional Finals; Elite Eight; Final Four; National Championship Game	Bethune-Cookman; Bellarmine; Philadelphia; St. Michael's; Southern Illinois	W 116–77; W 81–74; W 92–76; W 93–70; W 85–82 ^{OT}
1966	Regional Seminfinals; Regional Finals	Lamar; Southern Illinois	W 111–103; L 77–90
1968	Regional Seminfinals; Regional Finals; Elite Eight	Lincoln (MO); SW Missouri State; Trinity	W 95–80; W 79–73; L 77–93
1971	Regional semifinals Regional Finals; Elite Eight; Final Four; National Championship Game	Ashland; Central Michigan; Hartwick; Southwestern Louisiana; Old Dominion	W 72–64; W 78–60; W 105–69; W 93–74; W 97–82
1972	Regional Seminfinals; Regional Finals	Wittenberg; Eastern Michigan	W 81–73; L 88–93
1976	Regional Seminfinals; Regional Finals	Wright State; Eastern Illinois	W 85–75; L 73–75

=== NAIA tournament results ===
The Purple Aces have appeared in four NAIA Division I Tournaments. Their combined record is 3–4.

Year	Round	Opponent	Result
1941	First round	Texas Wesleyan	L 62–71
1942	First round Second Round	Peru State; East Central	W 73–50; L 30–42
1951	First round Second Round; Quarterfinals	Westminster; Morningside; Regis	W 85–74; W 75–62; L 68–70
1955	First round	Atlantic Christian	L 88–95

=== NIT results ===
The Purple Aces have appeared in two National Invitation Tournaments (NIT). Their combined record is 1–2.

Year	Round	Opponent	Result
1988	First round Sweet Sixteen	Utah; Boston College	W 66–55; L 81–88
1994	First round	Tulane	L 63–76

=== CBI results ===
The Purple Aces have appeared in two College Basketball Invitationals (CBI). Their combined record is 1–2.

Year	Round	Opponent	Result
2011	First round Quarterfinals	Hofstra; Boise State	W 77–70; L 69–75
2012	First round	Princeton	L 86–95

=== CIT results ===
The Purple Aces have appeared in three CollegeInsider.com Postseason Tournaments (CIT). Their combined record is 8–2. They were CIT champions in 2015

Year	Round	Opponent	Result
2009	First round	Belmont	L 72–92
2013	First round Second Round; Quarterfinals; Semifinals	Tennessee State; Eastern Kentucky; Canisius; East Carolina	W 84–72; W 86–72; W 84–83; L 58–81
2015	First round Second Round; Quarterfinals; Semifinals; Championship Game	IPFW; Eastern Illinois; Louisiana–Lafayette; UT Martin; Northern Arizona	W 82–77; W 83–68; W 89–82; W 79–66; W 71–65

== Retired jerseys ==
Twelve players and two coaches have had their jerseys retired by the school. Nevertheless, numbers remain active and can be worn by future players.

No.	Player	Year honored
3	Scott Haffner	1986–1989
5	Marcus Wilson	1995–1999
10	Don Buse	1969–1972
15	Brad Leaf	1979–1982
19	Gus Doerner	1939–1942
20	Hugh Ahlering	1957–1959
20	Scott Shreffler	1989–1993
31	Andy Elkins	1991–1995
40	Ed Smallwood	1958–1960
50	Larry Humes	1963–1966
50	Marty Simmons	1986–1988
52	Jerry Sloan	1962–1965
—	Arad McCutchan	1946–1977
—	Jim Crews	1985–2002
