= 1984 NCAA Division II men's basketball tournament =

- Teams: 32
- Finals site: , Springfield, Massachusetts
- Champions: Central Missouri State Mules (1st title)
- Runner-up: St. Augustine's (NC) Falcon (1st title game)
- Semifinalists: Kentucky Wesleyan Panthers (10th Final Four); North Alabama Lions (4th Final Four)
- Winning coach: Lynn Nance (1st title)
- MOP: Ron Nunnelly (Central Missouri State)
- Attendance: 67,392

The 1984 NCAA Division II men's basketball tournament involved 32 schools playing in a single-elimination tournament to determine the national champion of men's NCAA Division II college basketball as a culmination of the 1983-4 NCAA Division II men's basketball season. It was won by Central Missouri State (now known as the University of Central Missouri) and Central Missouri State's Ron Nunnally was the Most Outstanding Player.

San Francisco State's participation in the tournament was later vacated by the NCAA.

1984 NCAA Division II Men's sites - regionals (cyan) Quarterfinals (orange) Final Four (red)

== Regional participants ==
School	Outcome
C. W. Post	Runner-up
Gannon	Fourth Place
Mansfield	Third Place
St. Augustine's	Regional Champion

School	Outcome
American International	Fourth Place
Central Connecticut	Third Place
Sacred Heart	Regional Champion
South Dakota State	Runner-up

School	Outcome
Bellarmine	Third Place
Cal State Bakersfield	Fourth Place
Kentucky Wesleyan	Regional Champion
Lewis	Runner-up

School	Outcome
Norfolk State	Runner-up
Randolph–Macon	Third Place
Virginia Union	Regional Champion
Winston-Salem State	Fourth Place

School	Outcome
Morningside	Regional Champion
Nebraska–Omaha	Third Place
Northern Michigan	Fourth Place
Wayne State (MI)	Runner-up

School	Outcome
Central Missouri State	Regional Champion
Columbus State	Third Place
Jacksonville State	Runner-up
NW Missouri State	Fourth Place

School	Outcome
Chapman	Third Place
Puget Sound	Runner-up
San Francisco State	Regional Champion
UC Riverside	Fourth Place

School	Outcome
Albany State	Fourth Place
North Alabama	Regional Champion
Tampa	Third Place
West Georgia	Runner-up

*denotes tie

== Regionals ==
=== East - Erie, Pennsylvania ===
Location: Hammermill Center Host: Gannon University

Regional semifinals Round of 32; March 9
St. Augustine's	66
Mansfield	65
C. W. Post	65
Gannon	62

Regional Final; Sweet 16; March 10
St. Augustine's	86
C. W. Post	80

- Third Place - Mansfield 94, Gannon 78

=== New England - New Britain, Connecticut ===
Location: Kaiser Hall Host: Central Connecticut State University

Regional semifinals Round of 32; March 9
Sacred Heart	72**
American International	69
South Dakota State	74
Central Connecticut	59

Regional Final; Sweet 16; March 10
Sacred Heart	88*
South Dakota State	81

- Third Place - Central Connecticut 102, American International 90

=== Great Lakes - Owensboro, Kentucky ===
Location: Owensboro Sportscenter Host: Kentucky Wesleyan College

Regional semifinals Round of 32; March 10
Lewis	93
Bellarmine	87
Kentucky Wesleyan	96
Cal State Bakersfield	85

Regional Final; Sweet 16; March 11
Lewis	70
Kentucky Wesleyan	72

- Third Place - Bellarmine 81, Cal State Bakersfield 71

=== South Atlantic - Norfolk, Virginia ===
Location: Norfolk Scope Host: Norfolk State University

Regional semifinals Round of 32; March 9
Virginia Union	45
Randolph–Macon	30
Norfolk State	70
Winston-Salem State	61

Regional Final; Sweet 16; March 10
Virginia Union	58
Norfolk State	56

- Third Place - Randolph–Macon 69, Winston-Salem State 54

=== North Central - Omaha, Nebraska ===
Location: UNO Fieldhouse Host: University of Nebraska at Omaha

Regional semifinals Round of 32; March 9
Morningside	86
Northern Michigan	76
Wayne State	82
Nebraska–Omaha	70

Regional Final; Sweet 16; March 10
Morningside	75
Wayne State	73

- Third Place - Nebraska–Omaha 84, Northern Michigan 81

=== South Central - Warrensburg, Missouri ===
Location: CMSU Fieldhouse Host: Central Missouri State University

Regional semifinals Round of 32; March 8
Jacksonville State	78
NW Missouri State	75
Central Missouri State	50
Columbus State	47

Regional Final; Sweet 16; March 9
Jacksonville State	72
Central Missouri State	79

- Third Place - Columbus State 65, NW Missouri State 63

=== West - Tacoma, Washington ===
Location: Memorial Fieldhouse Host: University of Puget Sound

Regional semifinals Round of 32; March 9
~~San Francisco State~~	65
UC Riverside	57
Puget Sound	57
Chapman	52

Regional Final; Sweet 16; March 10
~~San Francisco State~~	59
Puget Sound	55

- Third Place - Chapman 74, UC Riverside 71

=== South - Florence, Alabama ===
Location: Flowers Hall Host: University of North Alabama

Regional semifinals Round of 32; March 8
West Georgia	64
Tampa	63
North Alabama	86
Albany State	73

Regional Final; Sweet 16; March 9
West Georgia	65
North Alabama	66

- Third Place - Tampa 87, Albany State 77

*denotes each overtime played

== National Quarterfinals ==
Quarterfinal - New Haven, CT; Elite Eight; March 17
St. Augustine's	107
Sacred Heart	92

Quarterfinal - Owensboro, KY; Elite Eight; March 15
Kentucky Wesleyan	72
Virginia Union	71

Quarterfinal - Warrensburg, MO; Elite Eight; March 16
Morningside	60
Central Missouri State	74

Quarterfinal - Florence, AL; Elite Eight; March 17
~~San Francisco State~~	68
North Alabama	76

== National Finals - Springfield, Massachusetts ==
Location: Springfield Civic Center Hosts: American International College and Springfield College

National semifinals Final Four; March 23
St. Augustine's	89
Kentucky Wesleyan	80
Central Missouri State	89*
North Alabama	85

National Championship; March 24
St. Augustine's	77
Central Missouri State	81

*denotes each overtime played

== All-tournament team ==
- Ken Bannister (Saint Augustine's)
- Rod Drake (Kentucky Wesleyan)
- Robert Harris (North Alabama)
- Ron Nunnelly (Central Missouri State)
- Brian Pesko (Central Missouri State)

== See also ==
- 1984 NCAA Division I men's basketball tournament
- 1984 NCAA Division III men's basketball tournament
- 1984 NCAA Division II women's basketball tournament
- NAIA Men's Basketball Championships
