= 1961 NCAA College Division basketball tournament =

Edition of USA college basketball tournament

- Teams: 32
- Finals site: Roberts Municipal Stadium, Evansville, Indiana
- Champions: Wittenberg Tigers (1st title)
- Runner-up: Southeast Missouri State Bears (1st title game)
- Semifinalists: South Dakota State Jackrabbits (1st Final Four); Mount St. Mary's Mountaineers (2nd Final Four)
- Winning coach: Ray Mears (1st title)
- MOP: Don Jacobson (South Dakota State)
- Attendance: 13,002

The 1961 NCAA College Division basketball tournament involved 32 schools playing in a single-elimination tournament to determine the national champion of men's NCAA College Division college basketball as a culmination of the 1960-61 NCAA College Division men's basketball season. It was won by Wittenberg University and South Dakota State's Don Jacobson was the Most Outstanding Player.

1961 NCAA Division II Men's sites - regionals (cyan) Elite Eight (red)

== Regional participants ==
School	Outcome
Austin Peay	Regional Champion
Belmont Abbey	Runner-up
Chattanooga	Fourth Place
Kentucky Wesleyan	Third Place

School	Outcome
Albright	Runner-up
Fairfield	Fourth Place
Mount St. Mary's	Regional Champion
Virginia Union	Third Place

School	Outcome
Bates	Runner-up
Rochester	Third Place
Springfield	Fourth Place
Williams	Regional Champion

School	Outcome
South Carolina State	Fourth Place
Wabash	Runner-up
Wittenberg	Regional Champion
Youngstown State	Third Place

School	Outcome
Chicago	Regional Champion
Evansville	Third Place
Lincoln (MO)	Runner-up
MacMurray	Fourth Place

School	Outcome
Colorado College	Fourth Place
SE Missouri State	Regional Champion
Southern Illinois	Runner-up
Trinity (TX)	Third Place

School	Outcome
Cornell (IA)	Third Place
Prairie View	Runner-up
South Dakota State	Regional Champion
Wisconsin–Superior	Fourth Place

School	Outcome
Chapman	Third Place
Long Beach State	Runner-up
Nevada	Fourth Place
UC Santa Barbara	Regional Champion

== Regionals ==
=== South – Clarksville, Tennessee ===
Location: Memorial Health Building Host: Austin Peay State College

Regional semifinals Round of 32; March 10
Belmont Abbey	74
Kentucky Wesleyan	62
Austin Peay	77
Chattanooga	69

Regional final Sweet 16; March 11
Belmont Abbey	63
Austin Peay	70

- Third place – Kentucky Wesleyan 111, Chattanooga 80

=== East – Reading, Pennsylvania ===
Location: Bollman Center Host: Albright College

Regional semifinals Round of 32; March 10
Mount St. Mary's	83
Virginia Union	80
Albright	85
Fairfield	67

Regional final Sweet 16; March 11
Mount St. Mary's	82
Albright	76

- Third place – Virginia Union 70, Fairfield 66

=== Northeast – Springfield, Massachusetts ===
Location: Judd Gymnasia Host: Springfield College

Regional semifinals Round of 32; March 10
Williams	74
Rochester	72
Bates	75
Springfield	63

Regional final Sweet 16; March 11
Williams	75
Bates	68

- Third place – Rochester 82, Springfield 68

=== Mideast – Crawfordsville, Indiana ===
Location: Chadwick Court Host: Wabash College

Regional semifinals Round of 32; March 10
Wittenberg	43
Youngstown State	28
Wabash	94
South Carolina State	83

Regional final Sweet 16; March 11
Wittenberg	48
Wabash	42

- Third place – Youngstown State 96, South Carolina State 82

=== Great Lakes – Chicago, Illinois ===
Location: Henry Crown Field House Host: University of Chicago

Regional semifinals Round of 32; March 10
Lincoln (MO)	90
Evansville	77
Chicago	64
MacMurray	59

Regional final Sweet 16; March 11
Lincoln	42
Chicago	55

- Third place – Evansville 98, MacMurray 97*

=== Southwest – Cape Girardeau, Missouri ===
Location: Houck Field House Host: Southeast Missouri State College

Regional semifinals Round of 32; March 10
SE Missouri State	99
Colorado College	68
Southern Illinois	96
Trinity (TX)	82

Regional final Sweet 16; March 11
SE Missouri State	88
Southern Illinois	84

- Third place – Trinity 75, Colorado College 58

=== Midwest – Brookings, South Dakota ===
Location: The Barn Host: South Dakota State College

Regional semifinals Round of 32; March 10
Prairie View	79
Wisconsin–Superior	68
South Dakota State	90
Cornell (IA)	71

Regional final Sweet 16; March 11
Prairie View	84
South Dakota State	88

- Third place – Cornell 83, Wisconsin–Superior 72

=== Pacific Coast – Santa Barbara, California ===
Location: Robertson Gymnasium Host: University of California, Santa Barbara

Regional semifinals Round of 32; March 10
Long Beach State	70
Chapman	66
UC Santa Barbara	78
Nevada	57

Regional final Sweet 16; March 11
Long Beach State	54
UC Santa Barbara	58

- Third place – Chapman 68, Nevada 63

*denotes each overtime played

== National finals – Evansville, Indiana ==
Location: Roberts Municipal Stadium Host: Evansville College

National quarterfinals Elite Eight; March 16
Austin Peay	78
Mount St. Mary's	96
Williams	51
Wittenberg	64
Chicago	41
SE Missouri State	67
South Dakota State	79
UC Santa Barbara	65

National semifinals Final Four; March 17
Mount St. Mary's	49
Wittenberg	65
SE Missouri State	81
South Dakota State	69

National championship March 18
Wittenberg	42
SE Missouri State	38

- Third place – South Dakota State 77, Mount St. Mary's 76

*denotes each overtime played

== All-tournament team ==
- George Fisher (Wittenberg)
- Don Jacobsen (South Dakota State)
- John O'Reilly (Mount Saint Mary's)
- Vivian Reed (Southeast Missouri State)
- Carl Ritter (Southeast Missouri State)

== See also ==
- 1961 NCAA University Division basketball tournament
- 1961 NAIA Basketball Tournament

== Sources ==
- 2010 NCAA Men's Basketball Championship Tournament Records and Statistics: Division II men's basketball Championship
- 1961 NCAA College Division Men's Basketball Tournament jonfmorse.com
