= 1989 NCAA Division II men's basketball tournament =

- Teams: 32
- Finals site: Springfield Civic Center, Springfield, Massachusetts
- Champions: North Carolina Central Eagles (1st title)
- Runner-up: SE Missouri State Indians (3rd title game)
- Semifinalists: UC Riverside Highlanders (2nd Final Four); Jacksonville State Gamecocks (2nd Final Four)
- Winning coach: Michael Bernard (1st title)
- MOP: Miles Clark (North Carolina Central)
- Attendance: 56,890

The 1989 NCAA Division II men's basketball tournament involved 32 schools playing in a single-elimination tournament to determine the national champion of men's NCAA Division II college basketball as a culmination of the 1988–89 NCAA Division II men's basketball season. It was won by North Carolina Central University, with North Carolina Central's Miles Clark named the Most Outstanding Player.

This was the first Division II men's tournament to adopt the current Elite Eight format, in which all eight regional winners advance to the championship site.

1989 NCAA Division II Men's sites - regionals (cyan) Elite Eight (red)

== Regional participants ==
School	Outcome
Bentley	Third Place
Bridgeport	Runner-up
Sacred Heart	Regional Champion
Stonehill	Fourth Place

School	Outcome
Alabama A&M	Third Place
Norfolk State	Fourth Place
North Carolina Central	Regional Champion
Virginia Union	Runner-up

School	Outcome
Bellarmine	Runner-up
Ferris State	Fourth Place
Kentucky Wesleyan	Regional Champion
SIU Edwardsville	Third Place

School	Outcome
Florida Southern	Third Place
Florida Tech	Fourth Place
Jacksonville State	Regional Champion
Tampa	Runner-up

School	Outcome
Alaska–Fairbanks	Fourth Place
Augustana (SD)	Third Place
Northern Colorado	Runner-up
Wisconsin–Milwaukee	Regional Champion

School	Outcome
Angelo State	Third Place
Central Missouri State	Runner-up
Northwest Missouri State	Fourth Place
Southeast Missouri State	Regional Champion

School	Outcome
Bloomsburg	Runner-up
Lock Haven	Third Place
Millersville	Regional Champion
Philadelphia U	Fourth Place

School	Outcome
Cal State Bakersfield	Runner-up
Cal State Dominguez Hills	Third Place
Sonoma State	Fourth Place
UC Riverside	Regional Champion

*denotes tie

== Regionals ==
=== New England - Waltham, Massachusetts ===
Location: Dana Center Host: Bentley College

Regional semifinals Round of 32; March 17
Bridgeport	132*
Stonehill	127
Sacred Heart	103
Bentley	88

Regional Final; Sweet 16; March 18
Bridgeport	67
Sacred Heart	69

- Third Place - Bentley 129, Stonehill 118

=== South Atlantic - Norfolk, Virginia ===
Location: Joseph G. Echols Memorial Hall Host: Norfolk State University

Regional semifinals Round of 32; March 17
Virginia Union	116
Alabama A&M	80
North Carolina Central	67
Norfolk State	64

Regional Final; Sweet 16; March 18
Virginia Union	55
North Carolina Central	60

- Third Place - Alabama A&M 93, Norfolk State 80

=== Great Lakes - Owensboro, Kentucky ===
Location: Owensboro Sportscenter Host: Kentucky Wesleyan College

Regional semifinals Round of 32; March 16
Kentucky Wesleyan	100*
SIU Edwardsville	87
Bellarmine	108
Ferris State	92

Regional Final; Sweet 16; March 17
Kentucky Wesleyan	84
Bellarmine	77

- Third Place - SIU Edwardsville 102, Ferris State 92

=== South - Jacksonville, Alabama ===
Location: Pete Mathews Coliseum Host: Jacksonville State University

Regional semifinals Round of 32; March 18
Tampa	90
Florida Southern	86
Jacksonville State	94
Florida Tech	70

Regional Final; Sweet 16; March 19
Tampa	67
Jacksonville State	89

- Third Place - Florida Southern 85, Florida Tech 75

=== North Central - Greeley, Colorado ===
Location: Butler-Hancock Sports Pavilion Host: University of Northern Colorado

Regional semifinals Round of 32; March 17
Wisconsin–Milwaukee	99
Augustana (SD)	95
Northern Colorado	92
Alaska–Fairbanks	70

Regional Final; Sweet 16; March 18
Wisconsin–Milwaukee	89*
Northern Colorado	88

- Third Place - Augustana (SD) 112, Alaska–Fairbanks 107**

=== South Central - Cape Girardeau, Missouri ===
Location: Show Me Center Host: Southeast Missouri State University

Regional semifinals Round of 32; March 17
Central Missouri State	78
NW Missouri State	74
SE Missouri State	65
Angelo State	60

Regional Final; Sweet 16; March 18
Central Missouri State	73
SE Missouri State	88

- Third Place - Angelo State 89, NW Missouri State 80

=== East - Millersville, Pennsylvania ===
Location: Pucillo Gymnasium Host: Millersville University of Pennsylvania

Regional semifinals Round of 32; March 16
Bloomsburg	74*
Philadelphia U	73
Millersville	97
Lock Haven	84

Regional Final; Sweet 16; March 17
Bloomsburg	71
Millersville	87

- Third Place - Lock Haven 82, Philadelphia U 78

=== West - Bakersfield, California ===
Location: CSUB Student Activities Center Host: California State University, Bakersfield

Regional semifinals Round of 32; March 17
UC Riverside	79
Sonoma State	65
Cal State Bakersfield	64
Cal State Dominguez Hills	61

Regional Final; Sweet 16; March 18
UC Riverside	63
Cal State Bakersfield	60

- Third Place - Cal State Dominguez Hills 98, Sonoma State 77

*denotes each overtime played

== Elite Eight - Springfield, Massachusetts ==
Location: Springfield Civic Center Hosts: American International College and Springfield College

National Quarterfinals; Elite Eight; March 23
Sacred Heart	57
North Carolina Central	58
Kentucky Wesleyan	70
Jacksonville State	107
Wisconsin–Milwaukee	84
SE Missouri State	93
Millersville	86
UC Riverside	92

National semifinals Final Four; March 24
North Carolina Central	90
Jacksonville State	70
SE Missouri State	84*
UC Riverside	83

National Championship; March 25
North Carolina Central	73
SE Missouri State	46

- Third Place - UC Riverside 90, Jacksonville State 81

*denotes each overtime played

== All-tournament team ==
- Miles Clarke (North Carolina Central)
- Maurice Pullum (UC Riverside)
- Antoine Sifford (North Carolina Central)
- Dominique Stevens (North Carolina Central)
- Earnest Taylor (Southeast Missouri State)
