= 1976 NCAA Division II basketball tournament =

Edition of USA college basketball tournament

- Teams: 32
- Finals site: , Evansville, Indiana
- Champions: Puget Sound Loggers (1st title)
- Runner-up: Chattanooga Mocs (1st title game)
- Semifinalists: Eastern Illinois Panthers (1st Final Four); Old Dominion Monarchs (2nd Final Four)
- Winning coach: Don Zech (1st title)
- MOP: Curt Peterson (Puget Sound)
- Attendance: 70,149

The 1976 NCAA Division II basketball tournament involved 32 schools playing in a single-elimination tournament to determine the national champion of men's NCAA Division II college basketball as a culmination of the 1975–76 NCAA Division II men's basketball season. It was won by the University of Puget Sound and Puget Sound's Curt Peterson was the Most Outstanding Player.

1976 NCAA Division II Men's sites - regionals (cyan) Quarterfinals (orange) Final Four (red)

== Regional participants ==
School	Outcome
Eastern Illinois	Regional Champion
Evansville	Runner-up
St. Joseph's (IN)	Fourth Place
Wright State	Third Place

School	Outcome
Chattanooga	Regional Champion
FTU	Fourth Place
Rollins	Third Place
Valdosta State	Runner-up

School	Outcome
Cal Poly Pomona	Third Place
Cal State Bakersfield	Runner-up
Puget Sound	Regional Champion
UC Davis	Fourth Place

School	Outcome
Baltimore	Runner-up
Madison	Fourth Place
Morgan State	Third Place
Old Dominion	Regional Champion

School	Outcome
Assumption	Runner-up
Bentley	Third Place
Bridgeport	Regional Champion
Quinnipiac	Fourth Place

School	Outcome
Grambling State	Runner-up
Lincoln (MO)	Third Place
Missouri–Rolla	Fourth Place
Nicholls State	Regional Champion

School	Outcome
Green Bay	Runner-up
Minnesota State	Third Place
Nebraska–Omaha	Fourth Place
North Dakota	Regional Champion

School	Outcome
Buffalo State	Third Place
Cheyney	Regional Champion
Hartwick	Fourth Place
Philadelphia U	Runner-up

*denotes tie

== Regionals ==
=== Great Lakes - Evansville, Indiana ===
Location: Roberts Municipal Stadium Host: University of Evansville

Regional semifinals Round of 32; March 10
Evansville	85
Wright State	75
Eastern Illinois	65
St. Joseph's (IN)	56

Regional Final; Sweet 16; March 11
Evansville	73
Eastern Illinois	75

- Third Place - Wright State 72, St. Joseph's 68

=== New England - Fairfield, Connecticut ===
Location: Alumni Hall Host: University of Bridgeport

Regional semifinals Round of 32; March 12
Bridgeport	93
Bentley	86
Assumption	64
Quinnipiac	60

Regional Final; Sweet 16; March 13
Bridgeport	86
Assumption	84

- Third Place - Bentley 83, Quinnipiac 77

=== South - Chattanooga, Tennessee ===
Location: Maclellan Gymnasium Host: University of Tennessee at Chattanooga

Regional semifinals Round of 32; March 11
Valdosta State	95
FTU	82
Chattanooga	86
Rollins	62

Regional Final; Sweet 16; March 12
Valdosta State	66
Chattanooga	86

- Third Place - Rollins 101, Florida Tech 91

=== South Central - Thibodeaux, Louisiana ===
Location: Stopher Gym Host: Nicholls State University

Regional semifinals Round of 32; March 11
Nicholls State	97
Lincoln (MO)	79
Grambling	67
Missouri-Rolla	61

Regional Final; Sweet 16; March 12
Nicholls State	90
Grambling	89

- Third Place - Lincoln 86, Missouri-Rolla 84*

=== West - Tacoma, Washington ===
Location: Memorial Fieldhouse Host: University of Puget Sound

Regional semifinals Round of 32; March 10
Puget Sound	80
Cal Poly Pomona	65
Cal State Bakersfield	87
UC Davis	65

Regional Final; Sweet 16; March 11
Puget Sound	75
Cal State Bakersfield	65

- Third Place - Cal Poly Pomona 84, UC Davis 82*

=== North Central - Grand Forks, North Dakota ===
Location: Hyslop Sports Center Host: University of North Dakota

Regional semifinals Round of 32; March 10
North Dakota	86*
Nebraska-Omaha	74
Green Bay	72**
Minnesota State	67

Regional Final; Sweet 16; March 11
North Dakota	65
Green Bay	61

- Third Place - Minnesota State 95, Nebraska-Omaha 73

=== South Atlantic - Norfolk, Virginia ===
Location: Norfolk Scope Host: Old Dominion University

Regional semifinals Round of 32; March 11
Baltimore	85
Morgan State	65
Old Dominion	86
Madison	77

Regional Final; Sweet 16; March 12
Baltimore	58
Old Dominion	73

- Third Place - Morgan State 86, Madison 81

=== East - Villanova, Pennsylvania ===
Location: Villanova Field House Host: Philadelphia College of Textiles and Science

Regional semifinals Round of 32; March 10
Philadelphia U	89
Buffalo State	69
Cheyney	73*
Hartwick	72

Regional Final; Sweet 16; March 11
Philadelphia U	59
Cheyney	60

- Third Place - Buffalo State 69, Hartwick 67

*denotes each overtime played

== National Quarterfinals ==
Quarterfinal; Elite Eight; March 15
Eastern Illinois	81
Bridgeport	66

Quarterfinal - Chattanooga, TN; Elite Eight; March 15
Chattanooga	107
Nicholls State	78

Quarterfinal - Tacoma, WA; Elite Eight; March 15
Puget Sound	80
North Dakota	77

Quarterfinal - Norfolk, VA; Elite Eight; March 15
Old Dominion	90
Cheyney	85

== National Finals - Evansville, Indiana ==
Location: Roberts Municipal Stadium Host: University of Evansville

National semifinals Final Four; March 18
Eastern Illinois	84
Chattanooga	93
Puget Sound	83
Old Dominion	78

National Championship; March 19
Chattanooga	74
Puget Sound	83

- Third Place - Eastern Illinois 78, Old Dominion 74

*denotes each overtime played

== All-tournament team ==
- Jeff Fuhrmann (Old Dominion)
- Jeff Furry (Eastern Illinois)
- Brant Gibler (Puget Sound)
- Wayne Golden (Tennessee-Chattanooga)
- Curt Peterson (Puget Sound)

== See also ==
- 1976 NCAA Division I basketball tournament
- 1976 NCAA Division III basketball tournament
- 1976 NAIA Basketball Tournament

== Sources ==
- 2010 NCAA Men's Basketball Championship Tournament Records and Statistics: Division II men's basketball Championship
- 1976 NCAA Division II men's basketball tournament jonfmorse.com
