= 1959 NCAA College Division basketball tournament =

Edition of USA college basketball tournament

- Teams: 32
- Finals site: Roberts Municipal Stadium, Evansville, Indiana
- Champions: Evansville Purple Aces (1st title)
- Runner-up: Missouri State Bears (1st title game)
- Semifinalists: North Carolina A&T Aggies (1st Final Four); Los Angeles State Golden Eagles (2nd Final Four)
- Winning coach: Arad McCutchan (1st title)
- MOP: Hugh Ahlering (Evansville)
- Attendance: 22,287

The 1959 NCAA College Division basketball tournament involved 32 schools playing in a single-elimination tournament to determine the national champion of men's basketball in the NCAA College Division, predecessor to today's NCAA Divisions II and III, as a culmination of the 1958–59 NCAA College Division men's basketball season. It was won by the University of Evansville, and Evansville's Hugh Ahlering was named Most Outstanding Player.

1959 NCAA Division II Men's sites - regionals (cyan) Elite Eight (red)

== Regional participants ==
| School | Outcome |
|---|---|
| Florida A&M | Runner-up |
| Lincoln (MO) | Third Place |
| North Carolina A&T | Regional Champion |
| Tuskegee | Fourth Place |

| School | Outcome |
|---|---|
| Adelphi | Third Place |
| American | Regional Champion |
| Hofstra | Runner-up |
| Wesleyan (CT) | Fourth Place |

| School | Outcome |
|---|---|
| Buffalo | Third Place |
| Le Moyne | Runner-up |
| St. Michaels | Regional Champion |
| Williams | Fourth Place |

| School | Outcome |
|---|---|
| Belmont Abbey | Third Place |
| Evansville | Regional Champion |
| Southern Illinois | Fourth Place |
| Wittenberg | Runner-up |

| School | Outcome |
|---|---|
| Hope | Regional Champion |
| Loras | Fourth Place |
| Wabash | Third Place |
| Wheaton (IL) | Runner-up |

| School | Outcome |
|---|---|
| Abilene Christian | Third Place |
| Centenary (LA) | Runner-up |
| SW Missouri State | Regional Champion |
| Western Illinois | Fourth Place |

| School | Outcome |
|---|---|
| Augustana (IL) | Fourth Place |
| Knox | Runner-up |
| South Dakota State | Regional Champion |
| Wartburg | Third Place |

| School | Outcome |
|---|---|
| Cal State Los Angeles | Regional Champion |
| Chapman | Runner-up |
| Sacramento State | Fourth Place |
| Willamette | Third Place |

== Regionals ==
=== South Central - Tuskegee, Alabama ===
Location: Logan Hall Host: Tuskegee Institute

Regional semifinals Round of 32; March 6
North Carolina A&T | 107
Tuskegee | 87
Florida A&M | 90
Lincoln (MO) | 73

Regional Final; Sweet 16; March 7
North Carolina A&T | 98
Florida A&M | 75

- Third Place - Lincoln 88, Tuskegee 64

=== East - Garden City, New York ===
Location: Woodruff Hall Host: Adelphi College

Regional semifinals Round of 32; March 6
American | 80
Adelphi | 73
Hofstra | 67
Wesleyan (CT) | 48

Regional Final; Sweet 16; March 7
American | 66
Hofstra | 65

- Third Place - Adelphi 69, Wesleyan 63

=== Northeast - Burlington, Vermont ===
Location: Burlington Memorial Auditorium Host: Saint Michael's College

Regional semifinals Round of 32; March 6
St. Michael's | 53
Buffalo | 51
Le Moyne | 72
Williams | 66

Regional Final; Sweet 16; March 7
St. Michael's | 71
Le Moyne | 70

- Third Place - Buffalo 78, Williams 53

=== Mideast - Evansville, Indiana ===
Location: Roberts Municipal Stadium Host: Evansville College

Regional semifinals Round of 32; March 5
Evansville | 66
Belmont Abbey | 54
Wittenberg | 80
Southern Illinois | 70

Regional Final; Sweet 16; March 6
Evansville | 56
Wittenberg | 50

- Third Place - Belmont Abbey 79, Southern Illinois 70

=== Great Lakes - Glen Ellyn, Illinois ===
Location: Glenbard High School Gym Host: Wheaton College

Regional semifinals Round of 32; March 6
Wheaton (IL) | 102
Wabash | 83
Hope | 102
Loras | 73

Regional Final; Sweet 16; March 7
Wheaton | 76
Hope | 93

- Third Place - Wabash 100, Loras 79

=== Southwest - Springfield, Missouri ===
Location: McDonald Hall and Arena Host: Southwest Missouri State College

Regional semifinals Round of 32; March 6
SW Missouri State | 87
Abilene Christian | 67
Centenary (LA) | 84
Western Illinois | 76

Regional Final; Sweet 16; March 7
SW Missouri State | 65
Centenary | 62

- Third Place - Abilene Christian 85, Western Illinois 81*

=== Midwest - Brookings, South Dakota ===
Location: The Barn Host: South Dakota State College

Regional semifinals Round of 32; March 6
South Dakota State | 73
Augustana (IL) | 56
Knox | 88
Wartburg | 84

Regional Final; Sweet 16; March 7
South Dakota State | 106
Knox | 80

- Third Place - Wartburg 69, Augustana 66*

=== Pacific Coast - Los Angeles, California ===
Location: Eagle's Nest Host: California State University, Los Angeles

Regional semifinals Round of 32; March 6
Cal State Los Angeles | 83
Sacramento State | 57
Chapman | 73
Willamette | 52

Regional Final; Sweet 16; March 7
Cal State Los Angeles | 86
Chapman | 82

- Third Place - Willamette 76, Sacramento State 57

*denotes each overtime played

== National Finals - Evansville, Indiana ==
Location: Roberts Municipal Stadium Host: Evansville College

National Quarterfinals; Elite Eight; March 11
North Carolina A&T | 87
American | 70
St. Michael's | 63
Evansville | 82
Hope | 74
SW Missouri State | 76
South Dakota State | 67
Cal State Los Angeles | 92

National semifinals Final Four; March 12
North Carolina A&T | 92
Evansville | 110
SW Missouri State | 72
Cal State Los Angeles | 59

National Championship; March 13
Evansville | 83
SW Missouri State | 67

- Third Place - North Carolina A&T 101, Cal State Los Angeles 84

*denotes each overtime played

== All-tournament team ==
- Hugh Ahlering (Evansville)
- Paul Benes (Hope)
- Joe Cotton (North Carolina A&T)
- Leo Hill (Cal State-Los Angeles)
- Jack Israel (Southwest Missouri State)

== See also ==
- 1959 NCAA University Division basketball tournament
- 1959 NAIA Basketball Tournament

== Sources ==
- 2010 NCAA Men's Basketball Championship Tournament Records and Statistics: Division II men's basketball Championship
- 1959 NCAA College Division Men's Basketball Tournament jonfmorse.com
