= 1971 NCAA College Division basketball tournament =

Edition of USA college basketball tournament

- Teams: 32
- Finals site: Roberts Municipal Stadium, Evansville, Indiana
- Champions: Evansville Purple Aces (5th title)
- Runner-up: Old Dominion Monarchs (1st title game)
- Semifinalists: Southwestern Louisiana Ragin' Cajuns (Vacated Final Four); Kentucky Wesleyan Panthers (7th Final Four)
- Winning coach: Arad McCutchan (5th title)
- MOP: Don Buse (Evansville)
- Attendance: 35,812

The 1971 NCAA College Division basketball tournament involved 32 schools playing in a single-elimination tournament to determine the national champion of men's NCAA College Division college basketball as a culmination of the 1970-71 NCAA College Division men's basketball season. It was won by the University of Evansville, with Evansville's Don Buse named the Most Outstanding Player.

Southwestern Louisiana's tournament and semifinal appearances were later vacated due to NCAA rules violations.

1971 NCAA Division II Men's sites - regionals (cyan) Elite Eight (red)

== Regional participants ==
School	Outcome
Kentucky Wesleyan	Regional Champion
North Dakota State	Third Place
Northeast Missouri State	Runner-up
St. Olaf	Fourth Place

School	Outcome
Akron	Third Place
Cheyney	Regional Champion
Philadelphia Textile	Runner-up
Wooster	Fourth Place

School	Outcome
Norfolk State	Runner-up
Old Dominion	Regional Champion
Roanoke	Fourth Place
Stetson	Third Place

School	Outcome
Cal Poly	Third Place
Puget Sound	Regional Champion
San Francisco State	Fourth Place
Seattle Pacific	Runner-up

School	Outcome
Assumption	Regional Champion
Central Connecticut State	Runner-up
Sacred Heart	Third Place
Stonehill	Fourth Place

School	Outcome
Louisiana Tech	Third Place
LSU–New Orleans	Fourth Place
Southwestern Louisiana*	Vacated
Tennessee State	Runner-up

School	Outcome
Ashland	Third Place
Augustana (IL)	Fourth Place
Central Michigan	Runner-up
Evansville	Regional Champion

School	Outcome
Buffalo State	Runner-up
C. W. Post	Fourth Place
Hartwick	Regional Champion
Montclair State	Third Place

*tournament appearance vacated

== Regionals ==
=== Midwest - Kirksville, Missouri ===
Location: Pershing Arena Host: Northeast Missouri State University

Regional semifinals Round of 32; March 11
Kentucky Wesleyan	94
St. Olaf	79
Northeast Missouri State	75
North Dakota State	66

Regional Final; Sweet 16; March 12
Kentucky Wesleyan	60
Northeast Missouri State	48

- Third Place - North Dakota State 96, St. Olaf 94

=== Mideast - Reading, Pennsylvania ===
Location: Bollman Center Host: Cheyney State College

Regional semifinals Round of 32; March 12
Philadelphia Textile	83*
Wooster	81
Cheyney	100
Akron	89

Regional Final; Sweet 16; March 13
Philadelphia Textile	58
Cheyney	60

- Third Place - Akron 77, Wooster 68

=== South Atlantic - Norfolk, Virginia ===
Location: Old Dominion University Fieldhouse Host: Old Dominion University

Regional semifinals Round of 32; March 12
Norfolk State	97
Roanoke	77
Old Dominion	89
Stetson	65

Regional Final; Sweet 16; March 13
Norfolk State	97
Old Dominion	102

- Third Place - Stetson 91, Roanoke 72

=== West - Tacoma, Washington ===
Location: Memorial Fieldhouse Host: University of Puget Sound

Regional semifinals Round of 32; March 11
Seattle Pacific	75
San Francisco State	68
Puget Sound	81
Cal Poly	69

Regional Final; Sweet 16; March 12
Seattle Pacific	78
Puget Sound	85

- Third Place - Cal Poly 70, San Francisco State 68

=== New England - Worcester, Massachusetts ===
Location: Andrew Laska Gymnasium Host: Assumption College

Regional semifinals Round of 32; March 12
Assumption	106
Sacred Heart	83
Central Connecticut State	111
Stonehill	99

Regional Final; Sweet 16; March 13
Assumption	105
Central Connecticut State	77

- Third Place - Sacred Heart 86, Stonehill 81

=== South - Lafayette, Louisiana ===
Location: Blackham Coliseum Host: University of Southwestern Louisiana

Regional semifinals Round of 32; March 12
Tennessee State	92*
Louisiana Tech	91
~~Southwestern Louisiana~~	113
LSU–New Orleans	107

Regional Final; Sweet 16; March 13
Tennessee State	82
~~Southwestern Louisiana~~	86

- Third Place - Louisiana Tech 107, LSU–New Orleans 88

=== Great Lakes - Evansville, Indiana ===
Location: Roberts Municipal Stadium Host: University of Evansville

Regional semifinals Round of 32; March 11
Central Michigan	63
Augustana (IL)	59
Evansville	72
Ashland	64

Regional Final; Sweet 16; March 12
Central Michigan	60
Evansville	78

- Third Place - Ashland 88, Augustana 65

=== East - Buffalo, New York ===
Location: unknown Host: Buffalo State College

Regional semifinals Round of 32; March 11
Hartwick	77
C. W. Post	50
Buffalo State	103
Montclair State	93

Regional Final; Sweet 16; March 12
Hartwick	71
Buffalo State	70

- Third Place - Montclair State 80, C. W. Post 68

*denotes each overtime played

== National Finals - Evansville, Indiana ==
Location: Roberts Municipal Stadium Host: University of Evansville

National Quarterfinals; Elite Eight; March 17
Kentucky Wesleyan	89
Cheyney	83
Old Dominion	81*
Puget Sound	80
Assumption	99
~~Southwestern Louisiana~~	110
Evansville	105
Hartwick	69

National semifinals Final Four; March 18
Kentucky Wesleyan	83
Old Dominion	97
~~Southwestern Louisiana~~	74
Evansville	93

National Championship; March 19
Old Dominion	82
Evansville	97

- Third Place - ~~Southwestern Louisiana~~ 105, Kentucky Wesleyan 83

*denots each overtime played

== All-tournament team ==
- Don Buse (Evansville)
- Rick Coffey (Evansville)
- John Duncan (Kentucky Wesleyan)
- Dwight Lamar (Southwestern Louisiana)
- Skip Noble (Old Dominion)

== See also ==
- 1971 NCAA University Division basketball tournament
- 1971 NAIA Basketball Tournament

== Sources ==
- 2010 NCAA Men's Basketball Championship Tournament Records and Statistics: Division II men's basketball Championship
- 1971 NCAA College Division Men's Basketball Tournament jonfmorse.com
