= 1962 NCAA College Division basketball tournament =

Edition of USA college basketball tournament

- Teams: 32
- Finals site: Roberts Municipal Stadium, Evansville, Indiana
- Champions: Mount St. Mary's Mountaineers (1st title)
- Runner-up: Sacramento State Hornets (1st title game)
- Semifinalists: Southern Illinois Salukis (1st Final Four); Nebraska Wesleyan Plainsmen (1st Final Four)
- Winning coach: Jim Phelan (1st title)
- MOP: Ron Roohrer (Sacramento State)
- Attendance: 7,749

The 1962 NCAA College Division basketball tournament involved 32 schools playing in a single-elimination tournament to determine the national champion of men's NCAA College Division college basketball as a culmination of the 1961–62 NCAA College Division men's basketball season. It was won by Mount St. Mary's University and Sacramento State's Ron Rohrer was the Most Outstanding Player.

1962 NCAA Division II Men's sites - regionals (cyan) Elite Eight (red)

== Regional participants ==
School	Outcome
Fairfield	Runner-up
Northeastern	Regional Champion
Rochester	Fourth Place
St. Anselm	Third Place

School	Outcome
Evansville	Runner-up
North Carolina A&T	Third Place
Southern Illinois	Regional Champion
Union (TN)	Fourth Place

School	Outcome
Albright	Third Place
C. W. Post	Fourth Place
Hofstra University	Runner-up
Mount St. Mary's	Regional Champion

School	Outcome
Florida A&M	Runner-up
Gannon	Fourth Place
Wittenberg	Regional Champion
Youngstown State	Third Place

School	Outcome
Cal Poly Pomona	Runner-up
Fresno State	Fourth Place
Sacramento State	Regional Champion
Seattle Pacific	Third Place

School	Outcome
Concordia (IL)	Runner-up
Illinois State	Fourth Place
Kentucky State	Third Place
Valparaiso	Regional Champion

School	Outcome
Abilene Christian	Fourth Place
Arkansas State	Runner-up
Lamar	Third Place
SE Missouri State	Regional Champion

School	Outcome
Grinnell	Fourth Place
Hamline	Third Place
Nebraska Wesleyan	Regional Champion
Northern Iowa	Runner-up

== Regionals ==
=== Northeast - Rochester, New York ===
Location: Louis Alexander Palestra Host: University of Rochester

Regional semifinals Round of 32; March 9
Northeastern	88
St. Anselm	78
Fairfield	86
Rochester	75

Regional Final; Sweet 16; March 10
Northeastern	80
Fairfield	69

- Third Place - St. Anselm 83, Rochester 64

=== South Central - Evansville, Indiana ===
Location: Roberts Municipal Stadium Host: Evansville College

Regional semifinals Round of 32; March 8
Southern Illinois	70
Union (TN)	56
Evansville	97
North Carolina A&T	82

Regional Final; Sweet 16; March 9
Southern Illinois	88
Evansville	83

- Third Place - North Carolina A&T 84, Union 80

=== East - Reading, Pennsylvania ===
Location: Bollman Center Host: Albright College

Regional semifinals Round of 32; March 8
Mount St. Mary's	67*
Albright	64
Hofstra	56
C. W. Post	55

Regional Final; Sweet 16; March 9
Mount St. Mary's	66
Hofstra	54

- Third Place - Albright 65, C. W. Post 59

=== Mideast - Akron, Ohio ===
Location: Memorial Hall Host: Municipal University of Akron

Regional semifinals Round of 32; March 8
Florida A&M	74
Youngstown State	60
Wittenberg	69
Gannon	43

Regional Final; Sweet 16; March 9
Florida A&M	33
Wittenberg	35

- Third Place - Youngstown State 58, Gannon 52

=== Pacific Coast - Sacramento, California ===
Location: Hornet Gym Host: Sacramento State College

Regional semifinals Round of 32; March 8
Cal Poly Pomona	88
Fresno State	81
Sacramento State	68
Seattle Pacific	57

Regional Final; Sweet 16; March 9
Cal Poly Pomona	65
Sacramento State	73

- Third Place - Seattle Pacific 73, Fresno State 68

=== Great Lakes - Valparaiso, Indiana ===
Location: Athletics-Recreation Center Host: Valparaiso University

Regional semifinals Round of 32; March 8
Concordia (IL)	79
Illinois State	61
Valparaiso	75
Kentucky State	61

Regional Final; Sweet 16; March 9
Concordia	72
Valparaiso	75

- Third Place - Kentucky State 77, Illinois State 72

=== Southwest - Jonesboro, Arkansas ===
Location: Indian Fieldhouse Host: Arkansas State College

Regional semifinals Round of 32; March 8
SE Missouri State	57
Abilene Christian	55
Arkansas State	66
Lamar	65

Regional Final; Sweet 16; March 9
SE Missouri State	76
Arkansas State	64

- Third Place - Lamar 83, Abilene Christian 74

=== Midwest - Lincoln, Nebraska ===
Location: Ira J. Taylor Gymnasium Host: Nebraska Wesleyan College

Regional semifinals Round of 32; March 9
Northern Iowa	81
Hamline	68
Nebraska Wesleyan	71
Grinnell	65

Regional Final; Sweet 16; March 10
Northern Iowa	77
Nebraska Wesleyan	78

- Third Place - Hamline 76, Grinnell 68

*denotes each overtime played

== National Finals - Evansville, Indiana ==
Location: Roberts Municipal Stadium Host: Evansville College

National Quarterfinals; Elite Eight; March 15
Northeastern	57
Southern Illinois	73
Mount St. Mary's	43
Wittenberg	39
Sacramento State	61
Valparaiso	54
SE Missouri State	61
Nebraska Wesleyan	71*

National semifinals Final Four; March 16
Southern Illinois	57
Mount St. Mary's	58
Sacramento State	74**
Nebraska Wesleyan	73

National Championship; March 17
Mount St. Mary's	58*
Sacramento State	57

- Third Place - Southern Illinois 98, Nebraska Wesleyan 81

*denotes each overtime played

== All-tournament team ==
- Jim Mumford (Nebraska Wesleyan)
- John O'Reilly (Mount Saint Mary's)
- Ed Pfeiffer (Mount Saint Mary's)
- Ron Rohrer (Sacramento State)
- Ed Spila (Southern Illinois)

== See also ==
- 1962 NCAA University Division basketball tournament
- 1962 NAIA Basketball Tournament

== Sources ==
- 2010 NCAA Men's Basketball Championship Tournament Records and Statistics: Division II men's basketball Championship
- 1962 NCAA College Division Men's Basketball Tournament jonfmorse.com
