= List of NCAA Division III men's basketball tournament bids by school =

This is a list of NCAA Division III men's basketball tournament bids by school, as of the start of the 2026 tournament. As of 2026, there are a total of 64 bids possible.

== Division III members ==
- Teams in **bold** competed in the 2026 NCAA Division III men's basketball tournament.
- These do not include appearances made by these teams in either the Division I (University Division) or Division II (College Division) tournaments before the establishment of the Division III tournament in 1975.
- School names reflect those in current use by their respective athletic programs, not necessarily those used when a school made an appearance in the Division III tournament.

Bids by school		First bid	Most recent		Sweet 16		Elite 8		Final 4		Finals		Champions	
#	School	First bid	Bid	Win	Last	#	Last	#	Last	#	Last	#	Last	#
31	Hope	1982	2026	2024	2017	11	2008	4	2008	3	1998	2		
30	Wittenberg (Note: The team qualified for the Sweet 16 (third round) in 2020 but the 2020 tournament was canceled before the third round due to the COVID-19 pandemic.)	1975	2020	2020	2020	17	2012	12	2006	7	2006	4	1977	1
29	Christopher Newport	1986	2026	2026	2026	13	2026	7	2026	4	2023	1	2023	1
29	Scranton	1975	2023	2023	2012	12	2012	6	1988	4	1988	3	1983	2
29	Wooster	1978	2020	2019	2016	11	2016	5	2011	3	2011	1		
28	Illinois Wesleyan	1984	2026	2026	2026	21	2026	13	2014	6	1997	1	1997	1
27	Franklin & Marshall	1975	2026	2018	2018	17	2012	10	2009	5	1991	1		
27	Washington–St. Louis	1987	2026	2026	2026	12	2025	6	2025	4	2009	2	2009	2
25	Salem State	1980	2019	2009	2009	7	2000	1	2000	1				
24	Calvin	1980	2025	2024	2024	10	2024	7	2005	4	2000	2	2000	2
23	Wisconsin–Whitewater	1983	2026	2026	2023	8	2023	6	2023	6	2014	4	2014	4
22	Randolph–Macon	1990	2026	2026	2026	12	2022	3	2022	2	2022	1	2022	1
21	Amherst	1994	2026	2026	2019	14	2016	10	2016	7	2013	3	2013	2
20	Maryville (TN)	1991	2019	2007	2004	3	1992	1						
20	Stockton (Stockton State, Richard Stockton)	1987	2025	2023	2023	11	2009	4	2009	2	2009	1		
20	Williams	1994	2024	2024	2024	14	2019	10	2017	8	2014	4	2003	1
19	John Carroll	1983	2026	2026	2018	7	2004	3	2004	1				
18	Augustana (IL)	1975	2019	2019	2019	13	2018	10	2017	6	2017	4		
18	Nebraska Wesleyan	1977	2024	2024	2024	11	2024	8	2018	5	2018	2	2018	1
18	Rochester (NY)	1981	2023	2022	2017	11	2017	6	2005	4	2005	3	1990	1
18	St. John Fisher	1992	2023	2023	2015	4	2006	1						
18	Whitworth	2003	2026	2024	2020	6	2011	1						
18	Widener	1975	2024	2024	2006	7	1987	3	1985	2	1978	1		
17	Catholic	1993	2026	2026	2025	6	2025	3	2001	1	2001	1	2001	1
17	Centre (KY)	1979	2020	2014	1989	5	1989	3	1989	2				
17	Claremont–Mudd–Scripps	1984	2026	2026	2024	1								
17	Clark (MA)	1978	2025	2010	2002	10	2002	8	1987	2	1987	2		
17	Hampden–Sydney	1989	2025	2025	2025	8	2024	4	2024	3	2024	2		
17	Wisconsin–Platteville	1991	2026	2025	2024	9	2024	7	1999	5	1999	4	1999	4
16	Rowan (Glassboro State)	1975	2024	2024	2024	10	1997	5	1996	4	1996	2	1996	1
16	Virginia Wesleyan	1978	2024	2015	2015	7	2015	4	2015	3	2007	2	2006	1
16	William Paterson	1975	2015	2015	2006	10	2006	5	2001	2	2001	1		
16	Wisconsin–Stevens Point	1997	2026	2018	2018	10	2015	6	2015	4	2015	4	2015	4
16	WPI	1982	2026	2025	2025	4	2022	2						
15	Gustavus Adolphus	1987	2026	2026	2026	8	2003	3	2003	1	2003	1		
15	Johns Hopkins	1990	2026	2023	2023	3								
15	Pomona–Pitzer	1986	2023	2022	2020	1								
15	Roanoke	1981	2026	2026	2025	5	1983	2	1983	1				
15	SUNY Potsdam (Potsdam State)	1978	2005	2005	2005	11	2005	10	1986	5	1986	5	1986	2
15	UMass Dartmouth (Southeastern Massachusetts)	1976	2022	2022	2022	11	1993	2	1993	1				
14	Babson	1992	2026	2026	2017	4	2017	2	2017	2	2017	1	2017	1
14	NYU	1986	2026	2026	2025	3	2025	2	2025	2	2025	2		
14	Otterbein	1978	2026	2026	2002	7	2002	6	2002	3	2002	1	2002	1
14	Ripon	1978	2020	2000	1986	1								
14	St. Lawrence	1975	2023	2009	2009	5	1998	1						
14	Western Connecticut	1986	2026	2012	1990	2	1990	1						
13	Buffalo State	1984	2011	2011	2011	6								
13	DePauw	1978	2015	2015	2002	4	2002	3	1990	2	1990	1		
13	Emory	1990	2026	2026	2026	7	2026	3	2026	1	2026	1		
13	Hamilton	1995	2025	2023	2019	6								
13	Saint John's (MN)	1985	2025	2025	2020	2								
13	Trinity (TX)	1998	2026	2026	2005	1	2005	1						
13	Wheaton (IL)	1995	2023	2023	2023	7	2023	3	2019	1				
12	Aurora	1998	2026	2018										
12	Central (IA)	1977	2025	2014	1985	3								
12	Ithaca	1977	2025	2025	2013	1								
12	Middlebury	2008	2023	2023	2018	5	2017	3	2011	1				
12	North Central (IL)	1984	2020	2020	2020	4	2013	1	2013	1				
12	SUNY Brockport (Brockport State)	1975	2020	2020	2020	7	2007	3	1975	1				
12	Trinity (CT)	1995	2026	2026	2026	6	2026	6	2026	4	2025	1	2025	1
12	Wisconsin–Oshkosh	1996	2023	2023	2023	5	2023	4	2019	2	2019	2	2019	1
11	Rhode Island College	1975	2014	2013	2011	4	2007	2						
11	Rose–Hulman	1977	2014	1997	1977	1	1977	1						
11	St. Norbert	1984	2025	2025	2016	2								
11	SUNY Plattsburgh (Plattsburgh State)	1976	2019	2018	2018	4	1976	1	1976	1				
11	Transylvania	1975	2026	2006	2006	3	2006	1						
10	Alvernia	1997	2015	2013	1997	1	1997	1	1997	1				
10	Capital (OH)	1982	2019	2019	2009	2	1982	1						
10	Husson	2009	2025											
10	Keene State	2004	2025	2025	2024	6	2017	2						
10	Marietta	1975	2022	2022	2022	6	2022	3	2022	1				
10	North Park	1978	2023	2023	2023	6	1987	5	1987	5	1987	5	1987	5
10	Ohio Northern	1980	2001	2001	2001	3	2001	2	2001	2	1993	1	1993	1
10	Ramapo	1991	2025	2025	2018	4	2018	3	2018	2				
10	Springfield	1996	2020	2020	2018	2	2018	1	2018	1				
10	Susquehanna	1984	2026	2022	2017	3	1986	1						
10	TCNJ (Trenton State)	1985	2026	2026	1989	3	1989	2	1989	1	1989	1		
10	Tufts	1995	2026	2026	2026	6	2026	2						
9	Allegheny	1975	1999	1998										
9	Beloit	1977	1995	1981	1981	1								
9	Benedictine (IL)	1991	2020	2016	2016	2	2016	2	2016	1	2016	1		
9	Buena Vista	1997	2012	2008	2008	3								
9	Endicott	2000	2026	2026	2026	2								
9	Hanover	1995	2019	2017	2017	3	2017	1						
9	Mary Hardin–Baylor	2007	2026	2026	2023	4	2022	2	2013	1	2013	1		
9	MIT	2009	2019	2019	2018	2	2018	2	2012	1				
9	Montclair State	1981	2026	2025	2003	3	1984	1						
9	Nazareth	1984	2022	2022	1987	2	1984	1						
9	Northwestern–St. Paul	2011	2022	2019	2015	1								
9	Penn State Behrend	2000	2026	2014	2000	1	2000	1						
9	Salisbury (Salisbury State)	1985	2019	2015	1997	2	1997	2						
9	SUNY Oswego (Oswego State)	2011	2024	2024	2023	4	2023	1						
8	Albertus Magnus	2010	2023	2015	2014	1								
8	Baruch	2000	2024											
8	Bethany (WV)	1978	2012	2002	1978	1								
8	Bridgewater State	1983	2018	2009	2009	2								
8	Chicago	1997	2026	2026	2026	5	2026	2						
8	Dubuque	1981	2024	1990	1988	2								
8	Eastern Connecticut	1992	2018	2018	2012	3	1993	1						
8	Elmhurst	1992	2024	2022	2022	3	2022	1	2022	1	2022	1		
8	Farmingdale State	2006	2024	2024	2009	1	2009	1						
8	Guilford	2007	2025	2024	2024	5	2024	5	2024	3				
8	Hartwick	1983	2016	1988	1988	2	1988	1	1988	1				
8	Lycoming	1985	2020	2017										
8	Merchant Marine (Kings Point)	1989	2010	2010	2001	1								
8	SUNY Cortland (Cortland State)	1997	2026	2026	2000	2								
8	SUNY Geneseo (Geneseo State)	1991	2014	1996	1995	3								
8	Wabash	1980	2024	2022	2022	2	2022	2	2022	2	1982	1	1982	1
8	York (PA)	1995	2025	2025	2005	1	2005	1	2005	1				
7	Baldwin Wallace	1979	2019	2019	1995	2	1979	1						
7	Brandeis	1975	2010	2010	2010	5	2010	4						
7	Cal Lutheran	1992	2025	1994	1994	2								
7	DeSales (Allentown)	1996	2024	2014	2010	2	2009	1						
7	Dickinson	1980	2015	2015	2015	2	2014	1						
7	Elms	2005	2013	2008										
7	Franklin	1998	2025	2025	1999	1								
7	Gettysburg	1996	2026	2025	2008	1								
7	Lebanon Valley	1993	2018	2005	1994	1	1994	1	1994	1	1994	1	1994	1
7	North Carolina Wesleyan	1983	2026	1987	1987	2	1987	1						
7	Ohio Wesleyan	1988	2016	2016	2016	3	1988	1	1988	1	1988	1	1988	1
7	RIT	1976	2009	1997	1997	1								
7	RPI	1975	2022	2022	2022	2								
7	Swarthmore	2017	2024	2024	2023	4	2023	3	2023	2	2019	1		
7	UMass Boston	1975	2006	1983	1978	2	1977	1						
7	Ursinus	1980	2008	2008	2008	3	2008	3	2008	2				
7	Wartburg	1975	2017	2017	2017	4	1987	1						
6	Albright	1977	2018	2005	1980	2	1980	1						
6	Bethany Lutheran	2018	2026	2018										
6	Grove City	1976	2020	2020										
6	Gwynedd Mercy	2004	2019	2019	2004	1								
6	Hobart	2001	2024	2020	2020	1								
6	Hunter	1990	1998	1998	1998	2	1998	1						
6	King's (PA)	1990	2008	2008	2005	1	2005	1						
6	Lawrence	1997	2009	2006	2006	2	2004	1						
6	Methodist	1975	2020	1997	1997	2	1997	1						
6	Mount Union	1997	2026	2023	2023	4	2023	1	2023	1	2023	1		
6	Nichols	2017	2023	2023	2023	2	2023	2						
6	Sewanee	1975	2023	1997										
6	Skidmore	2011	2019	2017										
6	Stevens	2007	2026	2022	2007	1								
6	Wesleyan (CT)	2015	2026	2026	2026	2	2025	1	2025	1				
6	Westfield State	1985	2025											
6	Wilkes	1995	2001	1999	1999	4	1998	3	1998	1				
6	York (NY)	1995	2014	2014										
5	Albion	1978	2019	2005	2005	2	2005	2	1978	1				
5	Alfred	1985	2019	2019	1986	1								
5	Averett	1990	2022	2009	1990	1								
5	Brooklyn	1982	2020	1982	1982	1	1982	1	1982	1				
5	Carthage	2000	2025	2010	2010	3	2002	2	2002	1				
5	Chapman	2010	2022	2011										
5	Elizabethtown	1979	2004	2002	2002	2	2002	1	2002	1	2002	1		
5	Heidelberg	1984	2026	1984	1984	1								
5	La Roche	2011	2024											
5	Loras	2007	2026	2024	2019	1								
5	Manchester (IN)	1993	2011	2011	1999	2	1995	1	1995	1	1995	1		
5	**Mary Washington**	2003	2026	2026	2026	3	2026	2	2026	1	2026	1	2026	1
5	Millsaps	1984	2008	2008	2008	2	2008	1						
5	Monmouth (IL)	1985	2018	1989										
5	Muskingum	1977	1990	1990	1981	1								
5	Neumann	2015	2026											
5	Occidental	1980	2008	2008	2003	1	2003	1						
5	Redlands	1985	2026	2026	2025	1	2025	1						
5	Rhodes (Southwestern)	1980	2026	1993	1981	1								
5	St. Mary's (MD)	2008	2013	2013	2013	4	2013	2						
5	Suffolk	1975	2002	1977	1975	1								
5	SUNY Morrisville (Morrisville State)	2012	2019	2014	2014	2	2014	1						
5	Union (NY)	1983	2018	2018										
5	Webster	2000	2020											
5	Westminster (MO)	1995	2017											
5	Whitman	2016	2020	2019	2019	4	2018	2	2017	1				
5	Wisconsin–La Crosse	2006	2026	2026	2026	2	2025	1						
5	Worcester State	1977	2026											
5	Yeshiva	2018	2026	2026	2026	2								
4	Augsburg	1985	2018	1999										
4	Berry	2018	2025	2025										
4	Bowdoin	1996	2014	2008										
4	Carnegie Mellon	1977	2024	2009										
4	Coast Guard	1979	2020	2008	2008	1	2008	1						
4	Coe	1975	2024	2024	1976	1								
4	Colby	1994	2020											
4	Colby–Sawyer	2001	2015											
4	Concordia Wisconsin	2000	2020											
4	Cornell College	1976	2022											
4	Delaware Valley	2011	2025											
4	Grinnell	1996	2026											
4	Hood	2007	2026	2026	2026	1								
4	Johnson & Wales (RI)	2004	2018	2016	2016	1								
4	LaGrange	2014	2017											
4	Lasell	2002	2008											
4	Lewis & Clark	2000	2025	2002	2002	2	2002	1						
4	MCLA (North Adams State)	1987	1990	1990	1990	1	1990	1						
4	McMurry	2000	2012	2001	2001	2	2000	1						
4	Misericordia	2012	2018											
4	Mitchell	2014	2023											
4	Moravian	1983	2019	2019										
4	Norwich	1984	2006	2006										
4	Penn State Harrisburg	2020	2026	2024										
4	Puget Sound	2004	2009	2009	2009	4	2006	1						
4	Saint Joseph (CT)	2020	2024	2024	2023	1								
4	Saint Joseph's (ME)	2003	2026											
4	St. Olaf	2014	2018	2018	2015	1								
4	St. Thomas (TX) (Note: St. Thomas (TX) won the 2022 SCAC tournament and would have received an automatic bid to the NCAA tournament, but was ineligible to participate in the postseason at that time due to its transition to the NCAA from the NAIA.)	2023	2026	2026	2026	1	2026	1						
4	Saint Vincent	2013	2016											
4	Simpson (IA)	1976	1996	1976										
4	Southern Maine	1988	1991	1990	1989	1	1989	1	1989	1				
4	SUNY Purchase	2010	2014	2014										
4	Texas Lutheran	2015	2019											
4	Utica	2006	2025	2023	2006	1								
4	Washington & Jefferson	1985	2026	2026	1994	1	1994	1						
4	Washington and Lee	1975	1980	1978	1978	1								
4	Washington College	1984	1990	1990	1990	2	1990	1	1990	1				
4	Western New England	1990	2025	2025	2025	1								
3	Anderson (IN)	2010	2024	2010										
3	Blackburn	2003	2022											
3	Bridgewater (VA)	1988	1997	1997	1997	1								
3	Carleton	2006	2023											
3	Carroll (WI)	2006	2012	2012	2007	1								
3	Case Western Reserve	2022	2024	2024	2024	2								
3	CCNY	1976	2003	1976	1976	1								
3	Chatham	2019	2025											
3	Denison	1997	2025											
3	Edgewood	2002	2012	2012										
3	Framingham State	1979	1984	1984	1984	2								
3	Gordon	2006	2014	2014										
3	Goucher	1995	1999	1997										
3	Greensboro	1985	1995	1995	1994	1	1994	1						
3	Hardin–Simmons	2016	2025	2025	2025	2								
3	Hendrix	1995	2015	1996										
3	Hiram	1975	1984	1984										
3	Illinois College	2003	2024	2024										
3	Kean	1978	1992	1992	1991	2	1991	2						
3	Lancaster Bible	2016	2023	2023										
3	Luther	1982	2011	2011	1982	1								
3	Lynchburg	1976	2016	2016										
3	Manhattanville	1978	2007											
3	Marian (WI)	2001	2022											
3	Marymount	2000	2024											
3	Messiah	2006	2012	2006										
3	Millikin	1983	1989	1988	1988	2								
3	Pittsburgh–Bradford	2002	2025	2025										
3	Shenandoah	1989	1996	1989										
3	Whittier	1979	1982	1981	1981	2	1981	1						
3	Wisconsin Lutheran	2006	2025	2025	2025	1								
3	Wisconsin–Eau Claire	2000	2020	2020	2000	1	2000	1	2000	1	2000	1		
3	Wisconsin–River Falls	2011	2017	2017										
2	Arcadia	2019	2023	2019										
2	Bates	2015	2026	2015	2015	1								
2	Bethel (MN)	1991	2017											
2	Castleton (Castleton State)	2004	2012											
2	Centenary (LA)	2020	2024											
2	Colorado College	1992	2004	1992										
2	Connecticut College	1998	1999	1999	1999	2	1999	1	1999	1				
2	Curry	2008	2013											
2	East Texas Baptist	2015	2023	2023	2015	1	2015	1						
2	Eastern	2022	2024	2024										
2	Emerson	2019	2022											
2	FDU Florham (FDU Madison)	1990	1998											
2	Fitchburg State	2013	2016	2016										
2	Greenville	2018	2025											
2	Hamline	1975	1977	1977	1977	2	1977	2	1977	1				
2	John Jay	2008	2025	2008										
2	Kenyon	1994	1995	1995	1995	1								
2	Lehman	2004	2026											
2	LeTourneau	2018	2020	2018										
2	Maine–Farmington	2010	2026	2026										
2	Minnesota–Morris	1978	1979	1978	1978	1								
2	Mount Saint Mary	2000	2005											
2	Mount Saint Vincent	1996	1997											
2	Muhlenberg	1995	1998											
2	New England College	2018	2020											
2	Oglethorpe	1994	1995											
2	Plymouth State	1996	2004	2004										
2	Rutgers–Newark	2010	2013											
2	St. Joseph's (LI)	2009	2012											
2	Salve Regina	1995	2011											
2	Schreiner	2018	2023											
2	Spalding	2013	2015											
2	Stevenson (Villa Julie)	2006	2007	2006										
2	SUNY Old Westbury	2004	2016											
2	SUNY Oneonta (Oneonta State)	1977	2010	1977	1977	1	1977	1	1977	1	1977	1		
2	SUNY Poly (SUNYIT)	2009	2010	2010	2010	1								
2	Vassar	2022	2026											
2	Wentworth	1997	2007											
2	Wilmington (OH)	2010	2014	2010										
2	Wilson	2022	2023											
1	Adrian	2020	2020											
1	Alma	2016	2016	2016	2016	1	2016	1						
1	Belhaven	2026	2026											
1	Cairn	2020	2020											
1	Clarkson	2008	2008											
1	Concordia Texas	2013	2013	2013										
1	Concordia–Moorhead	1996	1996											
1	Covenant	2016	2016											
1	Dallas	2004	2004											
1	Drew	2025	2025											
1	Eastern Mennonite	2010	2010	2010	2010	1	2010	1						
1	Elmira	1995	1995											
1	Eureka	2019	2019											
1	Geneva	2024	2024											
1	Huntingdon	2025	2025											
1	Immaculata	2008	2008											
1	Kalamazoo	1996	1996											
1	Keuka	2026	2026											
1	Knox	1975	1975											
1	La Verne	1993	1993	1993	1993	1								
1	Lake Forest	2019	2019											
1	Lakeland	2004	2004											
1	Linfield	2001	2001	2001										
1	Mary Baldwin	2024	2024											
1	Medgar Evers	2011	2011											
1	Mount St. Joseph	2016	2016											
1	MSOE	2003	2003											
1	MUW	2026	2026											
1	New England	2009	2009											
1	Oberlin	1976	1976	1976										
1	Pacific (OR)	2000	2000											
1	Pfeiffer	2025	2025											
1	Pittsburgh–Greensburg	2016	2016											
1	Randolph	2013	2013											
1	Regis (MA)	2015	2015											
1	Rivier	2007	2007											
1	Rockford	2003	2003											
1	Roger Williams	2024	2024											
1	Russell Sage (Sage)	2015	2015											
1	SUNY Canton	2020	2020											
1	SUNY Cobleskill	2015	2015											
1	SUNY Delhi	2023	2023											
1	SUNY Fredonia (Fredonia State)	1993	1993											
1	SUNY New Paltz	2024	2024											
1	Trine	2024	2024	2024	2024	1	2024	1	2024	1	2024	1	2024	1
1	Westminster (PA)	2007	2007											
1	Wisconsin–Stout	2006	2006	2006										

=== Teams with no appearances ===
Conference alignments are for the coming NCAA basketball season of 2026–27.

- **Allegheny Mountain Collegiate Conference** (5) – Alfred State, Carlow, Hilbert, Mount Aloysius, Penn State Altoona
  - Carlow is not eligible to compete for the national title until 2027–28.
- **American Southwest Conference** (1) – Howard Payne
- **Atlantic East Conference** (4) – Centenary (NJ), Marywood, Pratt, Saint Elizabeth (NJ)
- **Centennial Conference** (2) – Haverford, McDaniel
- **Coast to Coast Athletic Conference** (4) – Johnson & Wales (NC), Regent, UC Santa Cruz, Warren Wilson
  - Johnson & Wales (NC) and Regent are not eligible to compete for the national title until 2028–29.
- **Collegiate Conference of the South** (2) – Asbury, Piedmont
- **Conference of New England** (1) – Hartford
- **Empire 8** (1) – Houghton
- **Great Northeast Athletic Conference** (2) – Dean, Emmanuel (MA)
- **Heartland Collegiate Athletic Conference** (3) – Berea, Bluffton, Earlham
- **Independents** (1) – Maranatha Baptist
- **Landmark Conference** (1) – Juniata
- **Liberty League** (1) – Bard
- **Michigan Intercollegiate Athletic Association** (1) – Olivet
- **Minnesota Intercollegiate Athletic Conference** (3) – Macalester, Saint Mary's (MN), St. Scholastica
- **New England Women's and Men's Athletic Conference** (1) – Wheaton (MA)
  - Saint Anselm joins in 2027–28 but is ineligible to compete for the national title until 2029–30.
- **New Jersey Athletic Conference** (1) – Rutgers–Camden
- **North Atlantic Conference** (6) – Lesley, Maine Maritime, Maine–Presque Isle, Thomas (ME), Vermont State–Johnson, Vermont State–Lyndon
- **Northern Athletics Collegiate Conference** (3) – Concordia Chicago, Dominican (IL), Illinois Tech
- **Northwest Conference** (3) – George Fox, Pacific Lutheran, Willamette
- **Presidents' Athletic Conference** (4) – Franciscan, Saint Francis, Thiel, Waynesburg
  - Saint Francis is not eligible to compete for the national title until 2028–29.
- **Skyline Conference** (3) – St. Joseph's (Brooklyn), Sarah Lawrence, SUNY Maritime
- **Southern California Intercollegiate Athletic Conference** (2) – Azusa Pacific, Caltech
  - Azusa Pacific is not eligible for a tournament bid until 2028–29.
- **Southern Collegiate Athletic Conference** (3) – Austin, Ozarks, Southwestern (TX)
- **St. Louis Intercollegiate Athletic Conference** (2) – Lyon, Principia
- **United East Conference** (8) – Gallaudet, Keystone, Notre Dame (MD), Penn College, Penn State Abington, Penn State Berks, Penn State Brandywine, Valley Forge
  - Penn State Brandywine is not eligible for a tournament bid until 2027–28.
- **Upper Midwest Athletic Conference** (4) – Crown, Martin Luther, North Central (MN), Wisconsin–Superior
- **USA South Athletic Conference** (3) – Brevard, Southern Virginia, William Peace

== Former Division III members ==
Bids by school		Current level	First bid	Most recent		Sweet 16		Elite 8		Final 4		Finals		Champions	
#	School	Current level	First bid	Bid	Win	Last	#	Last	#	Last	#	Last	#	Last	#
20	St. Thomas (MN) (Note: The team qualified for the Sweet 16 (third round) in 2020 but the 2020 tournament was canceled before the third round due to the COVID-19 pandemic.)	Division I	1990	2020	2020	2020	9	2016	5	2016	4	2016	2	2016	2
19	New Jersey City (Jersey City State)	USCAA	1978	2019	2004	2004	6	1992	4	1992	2				
14	Cabrini	Defunct	1988	2018	2018	2013	4	2013	2	2012	1	2012	1		
13	Staten Island	Division II	1981	2018	2012	2012	3								
10	Albany (NY) (Albany State [NY])	Division I	1975	1995	1995	1994	5	1994	1						
9	Mississippi College	Division II	1998	2007	2007	2007	4								
8	UT Dallas	Division II	2005	2024	2024	2014	3	2009	1						
8	Upsala	Defunct	1978	1986	1986	1986	6	1984	3	1984	2	1980	1		
6	Fontbonne	Defunct	1996	2024											
6	Emory & Henry	Division II	1988	2018	1993	1993	2								
6	LeMoyne–Owen	Division II	1975	1986	1986	1986	5	1986	4	1986	2	1986	2	1975	1
6	Medaille	Defunct	2009	2022	2010										
6	Stony Brook	Division I	1977	1991	1987	1978	1	1978	1	1978	1				
5	NJIT	Division I	1991	1996	1995	1995	1	1995	1						
5	Defiance	NAIA	1993	2015	2015										
5	Rust	NAIA	1983	1997	1988										
5	Stanislaus State	Division II	1981	1989	1989	1989	4	1989	3	1982	1				
5	Wesley (DE)	Defunct	2009	2020	2014										
4	UC San Diego	Division I	1990	1994	1994	1991	1								
3	Ashland	Division II	1976	1978	1977	1978	3								
3	Becker	Defunct	2011	2017	2012										
3	Bishop (TX)	Defunct	1977	1983	1983	1982	2								
3	Cal Poly Humboldt (Humboldt State)	Division II	1978	1980	1980	1980	2	1978	1						
3	Maryville (MO)	Division II	1997	2006											
3	Savannah State	Division II	1979	1981	1981	1981	3	1981	1						
3	SCAD	NAIA (Note: SCAD discontinued its men's and women's basketball teams in 2009.)	2000	2003	2003										
3	Southern Vermont	Defunct	2003	2018	2003										
3	St. Andrews (NC)	Defunct	1981	1983	1983	1983	2								
3	Thomas More	Division II	2009	2018											
3	William Penn	NAIA	1979	1983	1983										
2	Birmingham–Southern	Defunct	2012	2016	2016										
2	Knoxville	Defunct	1977	1978	1978	1978	1	1978	1						
2	Lake Erie	Division II	2006	2007											
2	Lane (TN)	Division II	1979	1980	1980	1980	1	1980	1						
2	Lincoln (PA)	Division II	2006	2007	2007	2007	2								
2	Mansfield (Mansfield State)	Division II	1975	1976	1976	1975	1	1975	1						
2	Miles	Division II	1975	1976	1976	1976	2	1976	1						
2	Sul Ross State	Division II	2004	2018	2004	2004	1								
2	Upper Iowa	Division II	1996	1999											
1	Anna Maria	Defunct	1996	1996	1996	1996	1								
1	Bryn Athyn	Defunct	2025	2025											
1	Buffalo	Division I	1982	1982											
1	Cal State San Bernardino	Division II	1989	1989											
1	Cazenovia	Defunct	2002	2002											
1	Chaminade	Division II	1979	1979	1979	1979	1	1979	1						
1	City Tech (NY)	On hiatus	2005	2005	2005										
1	Clark Atlanta	Division II	1977	1977											
1	Clarks Summit (Baptist Bible Seminary)	Defunct	2008	2008											
1	Doane	NAIA	1975	1975		1975	1								
1	Ferrum	Division II	1992	1992	1992										
1	Longwood	Division I	1980	1980	1980	1980	1	1980	1	1980	1				
1	MacMurray	Defunct	2001	2001											
1	Milwaukee	Division I	1982	1982	1982										
1	Monmouth (NJ)	Division I	1976	1976	1976	1976	1								
1	Rosemont (PA)	Defunct	2019	2019											
1	Shepherd	Division II	1976	1976	1976	1976	1	1976	1						
1	Slippery Rock (Slippery Rock State)	Division II	1978	1978	1978	1978	1								
1	Sonoma State	Defunct	1983	1983	1983	1983	1								
1	Stillman	NAIA	1996	1996											
1	UNC Greensboro	Division I	1980	1980											
1	Wells	Defunct	2011	2011											

== Droughts ==
List of schools with the longest time between NCAA tournament appearances (minimum 20-year drought). Bold indicates an active current streak as of the 2026 tournament:

School	Appearance	Next appearance	Years
**Knox**	**1975**	–	**51 years**
**Oberlin**	**1976**	–	**50 years**
**Hamline**	**1977**	–	**49 years**
Coe	1976	2023	47 years
**Minnesota–Morris**	**1979**	–	**47 years**
**Washington & Lee**	**1980**	–	**46 years**
**Whittier**	**1982**	–	**44 years**
**Framingham State**	**1984**	–	**42 years**
**Hiram**	**1984**	–	**42 years**
Lynchburg	1979	2016	37 years
**Millikin**	**1989**	–	**37 years**
Marietta	1975	2011	36 years
**MCLA**	**1990**	–	**36 years**
**Muskingum**	**1990**	–	**36 years**
**Washington College**	**1990**	–	**36 years**
**Southern Maine**	**1991**	–	**35 years**
**Kean**	**1992**	–	**34 years**
SUNY Oneonta	1977	2010	33 years
North Park	1990	2023	33 years
**La Verne**	**1993**	–	**33 years**
**SUNY Fredonia**	**1993**	–	**33 years**
**Beloit**	**1995**	–	**31 years**
**Elmira**	**1995**	–	**31 years**
**Greensboro**	**1995**	–	**31 years**
**Kenyon**	**1995**	–	**31 years**
**Oglethorpe**	**1995**	–	**31 years**
**Anna Maria**	**1996**	–	**30 years**
**Concordia–Moorhead**	**1996**	–	**30 years**
**Kalamazoo**	**1996**	–	**30 years**
**Shenandoah**	**1996**	–	**30 years**
**Simpson (IA)**	**1996**	–	**30 years**
Carnegie Mellon	1977	2006	29 years
Brandeis	1978	2007	29 years
Worcester State	1994	2023	29 years
**Bridgewater (VA)**	**1997**	–	**29 years**
**Mount Saint Vincent**	**1997**	–	**29 years**
Transylvania	1978	2006	28 years
Coast Guard	1979	2007	28 years
Manhattanville	1979	2007	28 years
Rhode Island College	1979	2007	28 years
Monmouth (IL)	1990	2018	28 years
Washington & Jefferson	1994	2022	28 years
**FDU Florham**	**1998**	–	**28 years**
**Hunter**	**1998**	–	**28 years**
**Muhlenberg**	**1998**	–	**28 years**
Brooklyn	1982	2009	27 years
Luther	1984	2011	27 years
**Allegheny**	**1999**	–	**27 years**
**Connecticut College**	**1999**	–	**27 years**
**Goucher**	**1999**	–	**27 years**
Redlands	1985	2011	26 years
Bethel (MN)	1991	2017	26 years
**Pacific (OR)**	**2000**	–	**26 years**
CCNY	1976	2001	25 years
Albright	1980	2005	25 years
Moravian	1983	2008	25 years
Emory & Henry	1993	2018	25 years
**Linfield**	**2001**	–	**25 years**
**Ohio Northern**	**2001**	–	**25 years**
**Wilkes**	**2001**	–	**25 years**
Suffolk	1978	2002	24 years
Rhodes	1993	2017	24 years
Wabash	1998	2022	24 years
Grinnell	2001	2025	24 years
Roanoke	2001	2025	24 years
Western New England	2001	2025	24 years
Otterbein	2002	2026	24 years
**Suffolk**	**2002**	–	**24 years**
Occidental	1980	2003	23 years
UMass Boston	1983	2006	23 years
Dubuque	1990	2013	23 years
Emory	1990	2013	23 years
Colby	1997	2020	23 years
Marymount	2000	2023	23 years
Lewis & Clark	2002	2025	23 years
**CCNY**	**2003**	–	**23 years**
**MSOE**	**2003**	–	**23 years**
**Rockford**	**2003**	–	**23 years**
Westfield State	1993	2015	22 years
Susquehanna	1994	2016	22 years
Alfred	1997	2019	22 years
TCNJ	1998	2020	22 years
Cal Lutheran	2001	2023	22 years
Pittsburgh–Bradford	2003	2025	22 years
Lehman	2004	2026	22 years
**Colorado College**	**2004**	–	**22 years**
**Dallas**	**2004**	–	**22 years**
**Elizabethtown**	**2004**	–	**22 years**
**Lakeland**	**2004**	–	**22 years**
**Plymouth State**	**2004**	–	**22 years**
Sewanee	1976	1997	21 years
Ursinus	1982	2003	21 years
Grove City	1989	2010	21 years
Sewanee	1998	2019	21 years
**Mount Saint Mary**	**2005**	–	**21 years**
**SUNY Potsdam**	**2005**	–	**21 years**
Methodist	1977	1997	20 years
Bethany (WV)	1982	2002	20 years
WPI	1985	2005	20 years
Ohio Wesleyan	1988	2008	20 years
Illinois College	2003	2023	20 years
Montclair State	2003	2023	20 years
**Norwich**	**2006**	–	**20 years**
**UMass Boston**	**2006**	–	**20 years**
**Wisconsin–Stout**	**2006**	–	**20 years**

== See also ==
- NCAA Division III men's basketball tournament
- NCAA Division I men's basketball tournament
- NCAA Division II men's basketball tournament
- NAIA men's basketball championship
- NCAA Division I men's basketball tournament bids by school
- List of NCAA Division II men's basketball tournament bids by school
