= Glenn Robinson (coach) =

American basketball coach (born 1944)

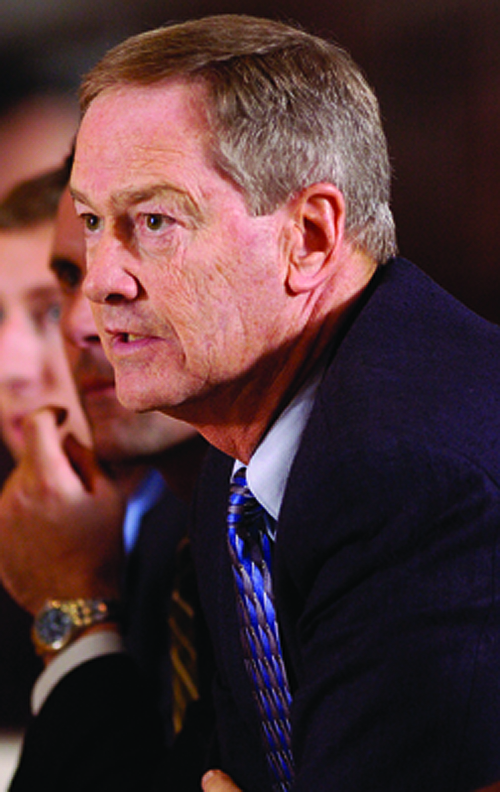
- Robinson in 2008

Biographical details
- Born: November 13, 1944 (age 81); Yeadon, Pennsylvania, U.S.
- Education: West Chester ('67)

Coaching career (HC unless noted)
- 1968–1971: Franklin & Marshall (assistant)
- 1971–2019: Franklin & Marshall

Head coaching record
- Overall: 967–359 (.729)
- Tournaments: 45–28 NCAA; 19–9 CC; 22–7 MAC

Accomplishments and honors

Championships
- 5 NCAA Division III Regional—Final Four (1979, 1991, 1996, 2000, 2009)

Glenn R. Robinson (born November 13, 1944) is a retired American basketball coach who coached the men's team at Franklin and Marshall College in Lancaster, Pennsylvania for 48 years. He is the all-time wins leader in Division III men's basketball history with over 900 career victories. He announced his retirement on November 5, 2019.

== Early life ==
Robinson grew up in Yeadon, Pennsylvania. He played high school basketball and baseball at Lansdowne-Aldan High School and then attended West Chester University, where he continued a standout career in both sports. Robinson graduated from West Chester in 1967 and was inducted into the school's Athletic Hall of Fame in 2004.

== Coaching career ==
Robinson came to Franklin and Marshall in 1968 as an assistant coach and became the head coach in 1971. Robinson's first season saw Franklin and Marshall improve to 7–14 and then again to 11–13 in his second season at the helm. The 1974 team achieved a record of 13–11, the program's best season since 1959. Robinson led the Diplomats to a school record 17 wins in 1976. He would go on to reset that record again in 1977 with 22 wins, 1979 with 27, 1991 with 28, and finally in 1996 with 29 victories.

Throughout his tenure, Robinson has coached numerous All-Americans. Former player and All-American Donnie Marsh is currently an assistant coach at UAB. Marsh also served as an assistant under Mike Davis at Indiana University from 2004–2006. Chris Finch, another one of Robinson's 15 All-Americans, is currently the head coach of the Minnesota Timberwolves of the NBA. Finch also played professionally and coached in Europe for several seasons and serves as the head coach for Great Britain men's national team.

Robinson has coached the Diplomats to the NCAA Division III Tournament 23 times, most recently in 2012, when the team reached the Elite Eight and finished with a 28-3 record. His teams have advanced to the Sweet 16 on 16 occasions and to the Elite Eight 10 times. Robinson has also led the Diplomats to five Final Fours, in 1979, 1991, 1996, 2000, and 2009. His 1991 team finished as National Runner-Up after falling to Wisconsin-Platteville in the national championship. He was named the Basketball Times Division III "Coach of the Year" in 1991 and has been named National Association of Basketball Coaches "Coach of the Year" 12 times, most recently in 2004, after guiding the Diplomats to a 26–4 record, Centennial Conference title, and Elite Eight appearance.

Robinson's success reached a high point when he became the all-time wins leader in Division III history by winning his 667th game against Muhlenberg College on February 14, 2004. Robinson is one of only four coaches in NCAA history to amass 900 career wins, putting him on the list with coaches like Mike Krzyzewski, Herb Magee and Bobby Knight.

On January 9, 2016, Robinson led his F&M Diplomats to a dramatic 57–54 victory over conference-rival Swarthmore at the Mayser Center to secure his 900th all-time win. He ended his career strong with some of his most successful seasons occurring in the final decade of his time at the helm. The Diplomats finished eight of the last 11 seasons with 20 or wins, advanced to the conference tournament in all 11 seasons, the conference finals six times and won four conference titles. The Diplomats also advanced to the NCAA Tournament on five occasions with a Final Four run, three Elite Eight showings and four Sweet 16 appearances.

Beyond the wins, Robinson has achieved a large graduation rate of his players. Of all the players to play for Robinson and earn a varsity letter, all but three have gone on to earn their degrees.

== Personal ==
Robinson has been married to Kathy for over 40 years. He is a Presbyterian.

== Head coaching record ==
Record table
Season	Team	Overall	Conference	Standing	Postseason
Franklin & Marshall (Middle Atlantic Conferences) (1974–1993)
1971–72	Franklin & Marshall	7–14	--	--	None
1972–73	Franklin & Marshall	10–12	6–4	--	None
1973–74	Franklin & Marshall	13–11	7–4	--	MAC 0–1
1974–75	Franklin & Marshall	16–11	8–3	--	NCAA Division III Regional Fourth Place
1975–76	Franklin & Marshall	17–8	9–3	--	MAC 1–1
1976–77	Franklin & Marshall	21–6	11–0	--	NCAA Division III Regional Third Place
1977–78	Franklin & Marshall	16–10	8–4	--	MAC 0–1
1978–79	Franklin & Marshall	27–5	11–1	--	NCAA Division III Final Four
1979—80	Franklin & Marshall	18–7	8–4	--	None
1980–81	Franklin & Marshall	26–3	9–2	--	NCAA Division III Regional Third Place
1981–82	Franklin & Marshall	17–9	9–3	--	MAC 0–1
1982–83	Franklin & Marshall	15–10	6–6	--	None
1983–84	Franklin & Marshall	21–8	10–2	--	NCAA Division III Regional Fourth Place
1984–85	Franklin & Marshall	8–17	3–9	--	None
1985–86	Franklin & Marshall	19–10	9–3	--	NCAA Division III Sweet Sixteen
1986–87	Franklin & Marshall	22–7	10–2	--	NCAA Division III Sweet Sixteen
1987–88	Franklin & Marshall	24–5	10–2	--	NCAA Division III Sweet Sixteen
1988–89	Franklin & Marshall	27–3	12–0	--	NCAA Division III Elite Eight
1989–90	Franklin & Marshall	24–4	10–2	--	NCAA Division III Second Round
1990–91	Franklin & Marshall	28–3	11–1	--	NCAA Division III Runner-Up
1991–92	Franklin & Marshall	26–4	10–2	--	NCAA Division III Elite Eight
1992–93	Franklin & Marshall	24–4	11–1	--	NCAA Division III Sweet Sixteen
(Centennial Conference) (1993–present)
1993–94	Franklin & Marshall	26–2	13–0	--	NCAA Division III Sweet Sixteen
1994–95	Franklin & Marshall	27–2	13–0	--	NCAA Division III Sweet Sixteen
1995–96	Franklin & Marshall	29–3	12–1	--	NCAA Division III Final Four
1996–97	Franklin & Marshall	11–13	5–8	--	None
1997–98	Franklin & Marshall	14–11	9–4	--	CC 0–1
1998–99	Franklin & Marshall	22–5	12–1	--	NCAA Division III Second Round
1999–00	Franklin & Marshall	25–7	11–2	--	NCAA Division III Final Four
2000–01	Franklin & Marshall	18–7	10–3	--	CC 0–1
2001–02	Franklin & Marshall	24–5	11–2	--	CC 1–1, ECAC South Region Champions
2002–03	Franklin & Marshall	25–5	10–3	--	CC 1–1, ECAC South Region Champions
2003–04	Franklin & Marshall	26–4	17–1	--	NCAA Division III Elite Eight
2004–05	Franklin & Marshall	23–7	14–4	--	CC 1–1, ECAC South Region Champions
2005–06	Franklin & Marshall	13–12	8–10	--	None
2006–07	Franklin & Marshall	8–17	7–11	--	None
2007–08	Franklin & Marshall	12–13	7–11	--	None
2008–09	Franklin & Marshall	26–7	14–4	--	NCAA Division III Final Four
2009–10	Franklin & Marshall	26–5	15–3	--	NCAA Division III Elite Eight
2010–11	Franklin & Marshall	23–6	15–3	--	NCAA Division III Second Round
2011–12	Franklin & Marshall	28–3	16–2	--	NCAA Division III Elite Eight
2012–13	Franklin & Marshall	20–7	14–4	--	CC 1–1
2013–14	Franklin & Marshall	17–9	13–5	--	
2014–15	Franklin & Marshall	20–6	13–5	--	
2015–16	Franklin & Marshall	22–6	15–3	--	NCAA Division III First Round
2016–17	Franklin & Marshall	18–8	12–6	--	
2017–18	Franklin & Marshall	22–7	14–4	--	NCAA Division III Sweet Sixteen
2018–19	Franklin & Marshall	15–11	9–9	--	
Total:		967–359			
National champion Postseason invitational champion Conference regular season champion Conference regular season and conference tournament champion Division regular season champion Division regular season and conference tournament champion Conference tournament champion

== Career highlights ==
- 12-time NABC Coach of the Year
- 1991 Basketball Times Division III Coach of the Year
- 2009 D3Hoops.com Coach of the Year
- 43 NCAA Tournament victories
- 24 seasons with 21 or more wins
- 23 NCAA DIII Tournament Appearances
- 16 trips to the Sweet 16
- 10 trips to the Elite Eight
- 5 trips to the Final Four
- One NCAA title game appearance

== See also ==
- List of college men's basketball career coaching wins leaders
