= Glenn Van Wieren =

American college basketball coach

Biographical details
- Born: August 17, 1942 (age 84)
- Education: Hope College (B.A., 1964); Western Michigan University (M.A.,); Brigham Young University (Ed.D.,)

Playing career

Basketball
- 1960–1964: Hope

Coaching career (HC unless noted)

Basketball
- ?–?: Grand Haven (MI) HS
- 1977–2010: Hope

Head coaching record
- Overall: 660–219 (college basketball)

Accomplishments and honors

Championships
- 17 MIAA

Glenn Lee Van Wieren (born August 17, 1942) is an American former college basketball coach who served as the head coach of the Hope Flying Dutchmen men's basketball team for 33 seasons spanning from 1977 to 2010.

== Head coaching record ==
Record table
Season	Team	Overall	Conference	Standing	Postseason
Hope Flying Dutchmen (Michigan Intercollegiate Athletic Association) (1977–2010)
1977–78	Hope	11–10	5–7	5th	
1978–79	Hope	5–17	2–10	7th	
1979–80	Hope	16–6	10–2	2nd	
1980–81	Hope	14–9	9–3	T–1st	
1981–82	Hope	19–5	10–2	1st	NCAA Sweet Sixteen
1982–83	Hope	19–4	11–1	1st	NCAA Sweet Sixteen
1983–84	Hope	22–2	12–0	1st	NCAA Sweet Sixteen
1984–85	Hope	22–4	11–1	1st	NCAA Sweet Sixteen
1985–86	Hope	15–9	8–4	2nd	
1986–87	Hope	21–5	11–1	1st	NCAA Sweet Sixteen
1987–88	Hope	19–8	10–2	1st	NCAA Sweet Sixteen
1988–89	Hope	19–5	9–3	2nd	NCAA first round
1989–90	Hope	22–4	10–2	2nd	NCAA second round
1990–91	Hope	24–2	12–0	1st	NCAA second round
1991–92	Hope	23–6	10–2	2nd	NCAA second round
1992–93	Hope	18–8	7–5	T–3rd	
1993–94	Hope	16–10	7–5	T–3rd	
1994–95	Hope	26–1	12–0	1st	NCAA first round
1995–96	Hope	27–5	11–1	1st	NCAA Runner–up
1996–97	Hope	26–3	12–0	1st	NCAA Sweet Sixteen
1997–98	Hope	26–5	10–2	1st	NCAA Runner–up
1998–99	Hope	15–11	10–4	T–1st	
1999–2000	Hope	15–11	9–5	3rd	
2000–01	Hope	16–10	8–4	2nd	
2001–02	Hope	21–9	8–4	T–2nd	NCAA second round
2002–03	Hope	23–5	10–2	T–1st	NCAA second round
2003–04	Hope	21–5	10–2	1st	
2004–05	Hope	15–12	10–4	3rd	
2005–06	Hope	28–3	12–2	2nd	NCAA Sweet Sixteen
2006–07	Hope	26–5	13–1	1st	NCAA Elite Eight
2007–08	Hope	28–4	13–1	1st	NCAA final Four
2008–09	Hope	21–8	11–3	2nd	NCAA first round
2009–10	Hope	21–8	11–3	2nd	NCAA first round
Hope:		660–219 (.751)	327–88 (.788)		
Total:		660–219 (.751)			
National champion Postseason invitational champion Conference regular season champion Conference regular season and conference tournament champion Division regular season champion Division regular season and conference tournament champion Conference tournament champion

== See also ==
- List of college men's basketball coaches with 600 wins
