= Claremont-Mudd-Scripps Stags basketball =

Claremont-Mudd-Scripps Stags men's basketball
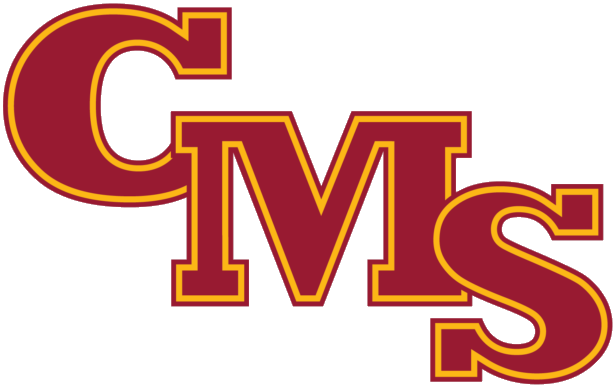
- University: Claremont Colleges
- Head coach: Ken Scalmanini
- Location: Claremont, California
- Arena: Roberts Pavilion (capacity: 2,200)
- Conference: SCIAC
- Nickname: Stags
- Colors: Cardinal and Gold

NCAA Division I tournament round of 32
- 1996, 2015, 2017, 2018, 2024, 2026

NCAA Division I tournament appearances
- 1984, 1987, 1988, 1990, 1991, 1996, 2002, 2006, 2009, 2010, 2012, 2015, 2017, 2018, 2024, 2025, 2026

Conference tournament champions
- 2009, 2010, 2012, 2015, 2017, 2018, 2024, 2025

Conference regular-season champions
- 1966, 1967, 1970, 1972, 1984, 1987, 1988, 1990, 1991, 1996, 2002, 2006, 2009, 2010, 2011, 2012, 2014, 2015, 2017, 2018, 2026

The Claremont-Mudd-Scripps men's basketball program was established in 1958. CMS teams coached by Ken Scalmanini have won 9 conference titles in 18 seasons, including 4 straight from 2009 to 2013. Former coach David Wells led CMS to their first NCAA Tournament victory in 1996. The CMS program comprises students from Claremont McKenna College, Harvey Mudd College and Scripps College, and participates in Division III (NCAA) for the Southern California Intercollegiate Athletic Conference (SCIAC).

== Season-by-season results ==
Statistics overview
Season	Coach	Overall	Conference	Standing	Postseason
Reel/Lepp (1958–1959)
1958–59	Reel/Lepp	1–20			
Reel/Lepp:		1–20			
Ted Ducey (1959–1974)
1959–60	Ted Ducey	7–18	1–9	6	
1960–61	Ted Ducey	11–16	4–6	3	
1961–62	Ted Ducey	9–16	3–7	5	
1962–63	Ted Ducey	8–13	1–9	6	
1963–64	Ted Ducey	11–12	5–5	3	
1964–65	Ted Ducey	9–12	4–6	5	
1965–66	Ted Ducey	18–11	7–3	1	
1966–67	Ted Ducey	23–7	9–1	1	
1967–68	Ted Ducey	13–10	4–6	4	
1968–69	Ted Ducey	8–16	4–6	4	
1969–70	Ted Ducey	20–6	8–2	1	
1970–71	Ted Ducey	16–9	6–4	3	
1971–72	Ted Ducey	16–9	10–2	1	
1972–73	Ted Ducey	6–20	5–7	5	
1973–74	Ted Ducey	6–18	4–8	5	
Ted Ducey:		181–193	75–81		
David Wells (1974–1999)
1974–75	David Wells	9–15	4–8	6	
1975–76	David Wells	4–21	2–10	6	
1976–77	David Wells	12–13	6–6	3	
1977–78	David Wells	8–17	5–7	4	
1978–79	David Wells	10–15	6–6	4	
1979–80	David Wells	13–12	8–4	3	
1980–81	David Wells	9–17	5–7	5	
1981–82	David Wells	10–16	5–7	5	
1982–83	David Wells	14–11	7–5	4	
1983–84	David Wells	17–10	12–0	1	NCAA First Round
1984–85	David Wells	14–12	7–5	3	
1985–86	David Wells	13–11	6–4	3	
1986–87	David Wells	21–7	8–2	1	NCAA First Round
1987–88	David Wells	19–8	7–3	1	NCAA First Round
1988–89	David Wells	14–11	7–3	2	
1989–90	David Wells	19–8	8–4	1	NCAA First Round
1990–91	David Wells	22–5	10–2	1	NCAA First Round
1991–92	David Wells	16–9	9–5	2	
1992–93	David Wells	10–14	6–8	5	
1993–94	David Wells	12–12	8–6	3	
1994–95	David Wells	15–10	10–4	2	
1995–96	David Wells	19–8	12–2	1	NCAA Second Round
1996–97	David Wells	10–15	9–5	2	
1997–98	David Wells	13–12	8–6	4	
1998–99	David Wells	16–9	11–3	2	
David Wells:		324–292	175–119		
Ken Scalmanini (1999–present)
1999-00	Ken Scalmanini	16–9	10–4	2	
2000–01	Ken Scalmanini	13–12	10–4	2	
2001–02	Ken Scalmanini	21–5	13–1	1	NCAA First Round
2002–03	Ken Scalmanini	15–10	8–6	3	
2003–04	Ken Scalmanini	14–11	10–4	2	
2004–05	Ken Scalmanini	14–11	10–4	2	
2005–06	Ken Scalmanini	19–7	13–1	1	NCAA First Round
2006–07	Ken Scalmanini	15–10	7–7	5	
2007–08	Ken Scalmanini	15–12	8–6	3	
2008–09	Ken Scalmanini	21–7	11–3	1	NCAA First Round
2009–10	Ken Scalmanini	21–7	11–3	1	NCAA first round
2010–11	Ken Scalmanini	16–10	11–3	1st	
2011–12	Ken Scalmanini	25–3	12–2	1st	NCAA first round
2012–13	Ken Scalmanini	18–8	13–3	2nd	
2013–14	Ken Scalmanini	20–6	15–1	1st	
2014–15	Ken Scalmanini	22–7	12–4	1st	NCAA second round
2015–16	Ken Scalmanini	13-12	8–8	4th	
2016–17	Ken Scalmanini	23–5	13–3	1st	NCAA Second Round
2017–18	Ken Scalmanini	20–8	15–1	1st	NCAA Second Round
2018–19	Ken Scalmanini	19–7	13–3	2nd	
2019–20	Ken Scalmanini	19–7	11–5	3rd	
2021–22	Ken Scalmanini	17–8	10–6	3rd	
2022–23	Ken Scalmanini	21–5	13–3	2nd	
2023–24	Ken Scalmanini	22–7	13–3	2nd	NCAA sectional semifinals
2024–25	Ken Scalmanini	20–8	12–4	3rd	NCAA First round
2025–26	Ken Scalmanini	23–5	13–3	T–1st	NCAA Second round
Ken Scalmanini:		497–213	303–101		
Total:		1003–718			
National champion Postseason invitational champion Conference regular season champion Conference regular season and conference tournament champion Division regular season champion Division regular season and conference tournament champion Conference tournament champion

== Postseason results ==
=== NCAA tournament results ===
The Stags have appeared in the NCAA Division III Tournament 14 times. Their combined record is 4–14.

Year	Round	Opponent	Result
1984	First Round	Nebraska Wesleyan	L 47–62
1987	First Round	Wartburg	L 81–91
1988	First Round	Dubuque	L 78–80
1990	First Round	Dubuque	L 77–84
1991	First Round	UC San Diego	L 72–76
1996	First Round; Second Round	Upper Iowa; UW-Whitewater	W 70–58; L 62–63
2002	First Round	Lewis & Clark	L 59–81
2006	First Round	Occidental	L 41–48
2009	First Round	Whitworth	L 63–81
2010	First Round	Chapman	L 47–58
2012	First Round	St Thomas	L 74–76 OT
2015	First Round; Second Round	Texas Lutheran; East Texas Baptist	W 79–55; L 75–80
2017	First Round; Second Round	Whitworth; Whitman	W 78–73; L 73–79
2018	First Round; Second Round	Whitworth; Whitman	W 83–82; L 84–89 OT
2024	First Round; Second Round; Sectional semifinals	St. Thomas (TX); Whitworth; Nebraska Wesleyan	W 78–71; W 69–67; L 70–74
2025	First Round	Ramapo	L 84–89 2OT
2026	First Round; Second Round	Aurora; UW–La Crosse	W 84–60; L 62–79

== Awards ==
=== SCIAC Player of the Year (since 1981) ===
Year	Name
1984	Rich Davis
1987	Todd Thomas
1988	Todd Thomas
1990	Henry Albrecht
1991	Chris Greene
1996	Kevin Zitar
2002	Bob Donlan
2006	Miles Taylor
2009	Chris Blees
2010	Chris Blees
2012	Chris Blees
2014	Tyler Gaffaney
2015	Tyler Gaffaney
2017	Michael Scarlett
2018	Michael Scarlett
2024	Josh Angle

=== SCIAC Coach of the Year (since 2015) ===
Year	Name
2015	Ken Scalmanini
2017	Ken Scalmanini
2018	Ken Scalmanini
