= John Bates (basketball) =

American basketball coach (1938–2015)

Biographical details
- Born: December 13, 1938; Union, South Carolina, U.S.
- Died: December 16, 2015 (aged 77); Ellicott City, Maryland, U.S.
- Education: Allen University

Coaching career (HC unless noted)
- 1971–1974: Maryland Eastern Shore
- 1974–1986: Coppin State

Accomplishments and honors

Championships
- NAIA (1976); 2 MEAC regular season (1973, 1974); MEAC tournament (1974)

Awards
- 3 MEAC Coach of the Year (1972–1974)

John H. Bates (December 13, 1938 – December 16, 2015) was an American college basketball coach, known for his time at Coppin State University, where he coached the team to a National Association of Intercollegiate Athletics (NAIA) championship and led the program's transition to NCAA Division I status.

Bates was born in Union, South Carolina, and attended Allen University. He started his coaching career at the high school level in his home state before ultimately becoming head coach at Maryland Eastern Shore in 1971. In three seasons with The Hawks, Bates compiled a 73–14 (.830) record. AT UMES, Bates led the school to the 1974 National Invitation Tournament, becoming the first historically black university to gain an berth in this tournament. Following the 1973–74 season, Bates moved to Coppin State, taking star center Joe Pace with him. The duo combined to lead the Eagles to the 1976 NAIA championship. Bates led the Coppin State program for 12 seasons, finishing with a record of 209–121. He is enshrined in the school's athletic hall of fame.

Bates died of an apparent heart attack on December 16, 2015, at 77.
