= 1977 NAIA basketball tournament =

College basketball tournament

1977 NAIA men's basketball tournament
- Season: 1976–77
- Teams: 32
- Finals site: Kemper Arena; Kansas City, Missouri
- Champions: Texas Southern (2 title, 1 title game, 3 Final Four)
- Runner-up: Campbell (1 title game, 1 Final Four)
- Semifinalists: Grand Valley State (1 Final Four); Henderson State (1 Final Four)
- Charles Stevenson Hustle Award: Don Laird (Campbell)
- MVP: Alonzo Bradley (Texas Southern)

The 1977 NAIA men's basketball tournament was held in March at Kemper Arena in Kansas City, Missouri. The 40th annual NAIA basketball tournament featured 32 teams playing in a single-elimination format.

== Awards and honors ==
- Leading scorer:
- Leading rebounder:
- Player of the Year: est. 1994

== 1977 NAIA bracket ==
First round	Second round
1	Newberry (S.C.)	84
-	Hastings (Neb.)	81
1	Newberry	57
16	Central Washington State	58
-	Keene State (N.H.)	56
16	Central Washington State	72
TOP TIER
9	Clarion State (Pa.)	88
-	Augsburg (Minn.)	84
9	Clarion State	65
8	Grand Valley State	79
-	Missouri-Kansas City	88
8	Grand Valley State (Mich.)	94
5	Texas Southern	89
-	Central State (Ohio)	65
5	Texas Southern	82
12	Wisconsin-Parkside	80
-	Paine (Ga.)	65
12	Wisconsin-Parkside	112
TOP TIER
13	East Texas State	70
-	Briar Cliff (Iowa)	59
13	East Texas State	92
-	Emporia State	89
-	Emporia State (Kan.)	76
4	Fairmont State (W.Va.)	71
3	Kentucky State	63
-	Alabama-Huntsville	72
-	Alabama-Huntsville	75
14	Alcorn State	76
-	Mount Marty (S.D.)	54
14	Alcorn State (Miss.)	90
BOTTOM TIER
11	Southwestern Oklahoma State	99
-	Southern Utah State	89
11	Southwestern Oklahoma State	56
-	Campbell	71
-	Campbell (N.C.)	76
6	Lincoln Memorial (Tenn.)	75
7	Henderson State (Ark.)	64
-	Tri-State (Ind.)	54
7	Henderson State	63
-	Dowling	59
-	Dowling (N.Y.)	75
10	Whittier (Calif.)	66
BOTTOM TIER
15	Hawaii-Hilo	81
-	Spring Garden (Pa.)	66
15	Hawaii-Hilo	74*
2	Illinois Wesleyan	85
-	St. Augustine's (N.C.)	67
2	Illinois Wesleyan	87

Elite Eight
16	Central Washington State	71
8	Grand Valley State	75
13	East Texas State	68
5	Texas Southern	87
-	Campbell	77
14	Alcorn State	63
7	Henderson State	87
2	Illinois Wesleyan	73

NAIA national semifinals
8	Grand Valley State	62
5	Texas Southern	69
-	Campbell	76
7	Henderson State	52

NAIA national championship
5	Texas Southern	71
-	Campbell	44

- * denotes overtime.

=== Third-place game ===
The third-place game featured the losing national semifinalist teams to determine 3rd and 4th places in the tournament. This game was played until 1988.

NAIA third-place game
8	Grand Valley State	73
7	Henderson State	96

== See also ==
- 1977 NCAA Division I basketball tournament
- 1977 NCAA Division II basketball tournament
- 1977 NCAA Division III basketball tournament
