= 1979 NAIA basketball tournament =

College basketball tournament

1979 NAIA men's basketball tournament
- Season: 1978–79
- Teams: 32
- Finals site: Kemper Arena; Kansas City, Missouri
- Champions: Drury (1 title, 1 title game, 1 Final Four)
- Runner-up: Henderson State (2 title game, 3 Final Four)
- Semifinalists: Southwest Texas State (4 Final Four); Midwestern State (2 Final Four)
- Charles Stevenson Hustle Award: Mike Carter (Drury)
- MVP: Lawrence Washington (Drury)

The 1979 NAIA men's basketball tournament was held in March at Kemper Arena in Kansas City, Missouri. The 42nd annual NAIA basketball tournament featured 32 teams playing in a single-elimination format.

== Awards and honors ==
- Leading scorer:
- Leading rebounder:
- Player of the Year: est. 1994

== 1979 NAIA bracket ==
First round	Second round
1	Cameron (Okla.)	76
-	Central State (Ohio)	69
1	Cameron	74*
16	Tri-State	73
-	Southern Maine	61
16	Tri-State (Ind.)	84
TOP TIER
9	St. John's (Minn.)	83*
-	West Virginia Wesleyan	81
9	St. John's	75
8	Southwest Texas State	79
-	Kentucky State	74
8	Southwest Texas State	78
5	Henderson State (Ark.)	70
-	Point Park (Pa.)	69
5	Henderson State	84*
12	Wisconsin-Eau Claire	78
-	Central Wesleyan (S.C.)	48
12	Wisconsin-Eau Claire	84
TOP TIER
13	Southern Tech (Ga)	75
-	California State-Dominguez Hills	66
13	Southern Tech	57
-	Quincy	61
-	Quincy (Ill.)	77
4	Birmingham–Southern (Ala.)	75
3	Drury (Mo.)	69
-	Hanover (Ind.)	60
3	Drury	72
14	Kearney State	69
-	LeMoyne-Owen (Tenn.)	79
14	Kearney State (Neb.)	98
BOTTOM TIER
11	High Point (N.C.)	91
-	Oregon Tech	62
11	High Point	65
6	Briar Cliff	76
-	Louisiana College	69
6	Briar Cliff (Iowa)	83
7	Central Washington	83
-	Dakota Wesleyan (S.D.)	62
7	Central Washington	66
-	Midwestern State	73
-	Midwestern State (Tex.)	64
10	Grand Valley State (Mich.)	63
BOTTOM TIER
15	Norfolk State (Virginia)	64
-	St. John Fisher(N.Y.)	57
15	Norfolk State	77
-	Marymount	87
-	Marymount (Kan.)	79
2	Grand Canyon (Ariz.)	74

Elite Eight
1	Cameron	73
8	Southwest Texas State	77*
5	Henderson State	70
-	Quincy	69
3	Drury	89
6	Briar Cliff	84
-	Midwestern State	77*
-	Marymount	76

NAIA national semifinals
8	Southwest Texas State	57
5	Henderson State	58
3	Drury	77
-	Midwestern State	59

NAIA national championship
5	Henderson State	54
3	Drury	60

- * denotes overtime.

=== Third-place game ===
The third-place game featured the losing national semifinalist teams to determine 3rd and 4th places in the tournament. This game was played until 1988.

NAIA third-place game
8	Southwest Texas State	101
-	Midwestern State	88

== See also ==
- 1979 NCAA Division I basketball tournament
- 1979 NCAA Division II basketball tournament
- 1979 NCAA Division III basketball tournament
