= 1980 NCAA Division III basketball tournament =

American collegiate men's basketball tournament (1980)

- Teams: 32
- Finals site: , Rock Island, Illinois
- Champions: North Park Vikings (3rd title)
- Runner-up: Upsala Vikings (1st title game)
- Semifinalists: Wittenberg Tigers (2nd Final Four); Longwood Lancers (1st Final Four)

The 1980 NCAA Division III men's basketball tournament was the sixth annual single-elimination tournament, held during March 1980, to determine the national champions of National Collegiate Athletic Association (NCAA) men's Division III collegiate basketball in the United States.

The tournament field included 32 teams with the national championship rounds contested at Augustana College in Rock Island, Illinois.

Two-time defending champions North Park defeated Upsala, 83–76, in the championship game to claim their third overall title.

== Bracket ==
=== Regionals ===
First round
Longwood	73
Framingham State	63
Clark (MA)	90
Salem State	71

Regional Championship
Longwood	70
Clark (MA)	60
Regional Third-place
Framingham State	82
Salem State	84

First round
Potsdam	93
Stony Brook	75
Albany	75
St. Lawrence	66

Regional Championship
Potsdam	87
Albany	72
Regional Third-place
Stony Brook	85
St. Lawrence	70

First round
North Park	91
Ripon	73
Augustana (IL)	76
Central	74

Regional Championship
North Park	72
Augustana (IL)	60
Regional Third-place
Ripon	81
Central	71

First round
Jersey City State	66
Beloit	55
Humboldt State	66
Occidental	54

Regional Championship
Jersey City State	74
Humboldt State	73
Regional Third-place
Beloit	69
Occidental	57

First round
Upsala	78
Washington & Lee	70
William Paterson	81
Allegheny	74

Regional Championship
Upsala	104
William Paterson	79
Regional Third-place
Washington & Lee	80
Allegheny	103

First round
Albright	88
Ursinus	72
Scranton	51
Dickinson	48

Regional Championship
Albright	81
Scranton	73
Regional Third-place
Ursinus	64
Dickinson	77

First round
Wittenberg	76
Wabash	68
Ohio Northern	92
Calvin	80

Regional Championship
Wittenberg	59
Ohio Northern	51
Regional Third-place
Wabash	76
Calvin	88

First round
Lane	57
Southwestern (TN)	54
Savannah State	61
UNC Greensboro	58

Regional Championship
Lane	87
Savannah State	70
Regional Third-place
Southwestern (TN)	88
UNC Greensboro	80

=== National finals ===
- Site: Rock Island, Illinois

National quarterfinals
Longwood	78
Potsdam	61
North Park	86
Jersey City State	63
Upsala	71
Albright	58
Wittenberg	69
Lane	59

National semifinals
Longwood	55
North Park	57
Upsala	67
Wittenberg	63

National championship
North Park	83
Upsala	76
National third-place game
Longwood	47
Wittenberg	48

== See also ==
- 1980 NCAA Division I basketball tournament
- 1980 NCAA Division II basketball tournament
- 1980 NAIA basketball tournament
