= 1981 NCAA Division III basketball tournament =

American collegiate men's basketball tournament (1981)

- Teams: 32
- Finals site: , Rock Island, Illinois
- Champions: Potsdam State Bears (1st title)
- Runner-up: Augustana Vikings (1st title game)
- Semifinalists: Ursinus Bears (1st Final Four); Otterbein Cardinals (1st Final Four)
- Winning coach: Jerry Welsh (Potsdam State)

The 1981 NCAA Division III men's basketball tournament was the seventh annual single-elimination tournament, held during March 1981, to determine the national champions of National Collegiate Athletic Association (NCAA) men's Division III collegiate basketball in the United States.

The tournament field included 32 teams with the national championship rounds contested at Augustana College in Rock Island, Illinois.

SUNY Potsdam defeated hosts Augustana (IL), 67–65 (in overtime), in the championship game to claim their first national title.

== Bracket ==
=== Regionals ===
First round
Clark (MA)	109
UMass Boston	69
Rochester (NY)	75
Salem State	62

Regional Championship
Clark (MA)	78
Rochester (NY)	74
Regional Third-place
UMass Boston	90
Salem State	91

First round
Potsdam State	80
Staten Island	57
Albany (NY)	45
St. Lawrence	44

Regional Championship
Potsdam State	68*
Albany (NY)	63
Regional Third-place
Staten Island	60
St. Lawrence	62

First round
Ursinus	69
Franklin & Marshall	58
William Paterson	87
Scranton	70

Regional Championship
Ursinus	66
William Paterson	64
Regional Third-place
Franklin & Marshall	73
Scranton	68

First round
Upsala	73
Allegheny	66
Montclair State	57
Roanoke	55

Regional Championship
Upsala	86
Montclair State	64
Regional Third-place
Allegheny	75
Roanoke	84

First round
Beloit	68
William Penn	58
Augustana (IL)	81
North Park	68

Regional Championship
Beloit	53
Augustana (IL)	56
Regional Third-place
William Penn	85
North Park	81

First round
Whittier	103
Stanislaus State	95
Muskingum	75
Dubuque	61

Regional Championship
Whittier	66*
Muskingum	61
Regional Third-place
Stanislaus State	73
Dubuque	86

First round
Wittenberg	72
Calvin	50
Otterbein	81
Wabash	69

Regional Championship
Wittenberg	68
Otterbein	72
Regional Third-place
Calvin	71
Wabash	93

First round
Savannah State	76
Rose–Hulman	62
Southwestern (TN)	72
St. Andrews	70

Regional Championship
Savannah State	76
Southwestern (TN)	75
Regional Third-place
Rose–Hulman	80
St. Andrews	84

=== National finals ===
National quarterfinals
Clark (MA)	81
Potsdam State	87
Ursinus	71
Upsala	69
Augustana (IL)	69
Whittier	67
Otterbein	67*
Savannah State	64

National semifinals
Potsdam State	63
Ursinus	61
Augustana (IL)	93
Otterbein	81

National championship
Potsdam State	67*
Augustana (IL)	65
National third-place game
Ursinus	82
Otterbein	79

== See also ==
- 1981 NCAA Division I basketball tournament
- 1981 NCAA Division II basketball tournament
- 1981 NAIA men's basketball tournament
