= 1980 NCAA Division II basketball tournament =

Edition of USA college basketball tournament

- Teams: 32
- Finals site: , Springfield, Massachusetts
- Champions: Virginia Union Panthers (1st title)
- Runner-up: New York Tech Bears (1st title game)
- Semifinalists: Florida Southern Moccasins (1st Final Four); North Alabama Lions (2nd Final Four)
- Winning coach: Dave Robbins (1st title)
- MOP: Keith Valentine (Virginia Union)
- Attendance: 44,815

The 1980 NCAA Division II basketball tournament involved 32 schools playing in a single-elimination tournament to determine the national champion of men's NCAA Division II college basketball as a culmination of the 1979–80 NCAA Division II men's basketball season. It was won by Virginia Union University and Virginia Union's Keith Valentine was the Most Outstanding Player.

1980 NCAA Division II Men's sites - regionals (cyan) Quarterfinals (orange) Final Four (red)

== Regional participants ==
School	Outcome
Benedict	Fourth Place
Mount St. Mary's	Third Place
UMBC	Runner-up
Virginia Union	Regional Champion

School	Outcome
Bryant	Fourth Place
New Hampshire College	Regional Champion
Quinnipiac	Third Place
Springfield	Runner-up

School	Outcome
North Dakota	Fourth Place
South Dakota State	Regional Champion
Stonehill	Third Place
Western Illinois	Runner-up

School	Outcome
Bethune–Cookman	Fourth Place
Florida Southern	Regional Champion
UCF	Runner-up
West Georgia	Third Place

School	Outcome
Cal Poly	Runner-up
Puget Sound	Third Place
San Francisco State	Fourth Place
UC Riverside	Regional Champion

School	Outcome
Central Missouri State	Third Place
Jacksonville State	Fourth Place
Nicholls State	Runner-up
North Alabama	Regional Champion

School	Outcome
Cheyney	Third Place
Gannon	Fourth Place
Hartwick	Runner-up
NYIT	Regional Champion

School	Outcome
Eastern Illinois	Runner-up
Indiana State–Evansville	Fourth Place
Northern Michigan	Regional Champion
Wright State	Third Place

*denotes tie

== Regionals ==
=== South Atlantic - Catonsville, Maryland ===
Location: UMBC Fieldhouse Host: University of Maryland, Baltimore County

Regional semifinals Round of 32; February 29
UMBC	86
Benedict	69
Virginia Union	72
Mount St. Mary's	70

Regional Final; Sweet 16; March 1
UMBC	65
Virginia Union	80

- Third Place - Mount St. Mary's 84, Benedict 82

=== New England - Smithfield, Rhode Island ===
Location: Bryant Gymnasium Host: Bryant College

Regional semifinals Round of 32; February 29
Springfield	91
Bryant	78
New Hampshire College	98
Quinnipiac	89

Regional Final; Sweet 16; March 1
Springfield	80
New Hampshire College	89

- Third Place - Quinnipiac 102, Bryant 97

=== North Central - Brookings, South Dakota ===
Location: Frost Arena Host: South Dakota State University

Regional semifinals Round of 32; February 29
South Dakota State	74
Stonehill	51
Western Illinois	102
North Dakota	79

Regional Final; Sweet 16; March 1
South Dakota State	98
Western Illinois	86

- Third Place - Stonehill 70, North Dakota 57

=== South - Lakeland, Florida ===
Location: Jenkins Fieldhouse Host: Florida Southern College

Regional semifinals Round of 32; February 28
Florida Southern	81
Bethune–Cookman	72
UCF	81
West Georgia	78

Regional Final; Sweet 16; February 29
Florida Southern	71
UCF	64

- Third Place - West Georgia 75, Bethune-Cookman 63

=== West - Tacoma, Washington ===
Location: Memorial Fieldhouse Host: University of Puget Sound

Regional semifinals Round of 32; March 1
UC Riverside	65
Puget Sound	61
Cal Poly	66
San Francisco State	46

Regional Final; Sweet 16; March 2
UC Riverside	62
Cal Poly	53

- Third Place - Puget Sound 93, San Francisco State 86

=== South Central - Warrensburg, Missouri ===
Location: CMSU Fieldhouse Host: Central Missouri State University

Regional semifinals Round of 32; February 29
North Alabama	98
Central Missouri State	86
Nicholls State	78
Jacksonville State	76

Regional Final; Sweet 16; March 1
North Alabama	77
Nicholls State	68

- Third Place - Central Missouri State 112, Jacksonville State 91

=== East - Erie, Pennsylvania ===
Location: Hammermill Center Host: Gannon University

Regional semifinals Round of 32; February 29
NYIT	81
Gannon	59
Hartwick	67
Cheyney	64

Regional Final; Sweet 16; March 1
NYIT	80
Hartwick	78

- Third Place - Cheyney 87, Gannon 86

=== Great Lakes - Dayton, Ohio ===
Location: Physical Education Building Host: Wright State University

Regional semifinals Round of 32; February 29
Eastern Illinois	74
Wright State	63
Northern Michigan	93
Indiana State–Evansville	82

Regional Final; Sweet 16; March 1
Eastern Illinois	56
Northern Michigan	58

- Third Place - Wright State 88, Indiana State–Evansville 85

*denotes each overtime played

== National Quarterfinals ==
Quarterfinal - Richmond, VA; Elite Eight; March 8
Virginia Union	108
New Hampshire College	91

Quarterfinal - Lakeland, FL; Elite Eight; March 8
South Dakota State	71
Florida Southern	81

Quarterfinal - Florence, AL; Elite Eight; March 8
UC Riverside	69
North Alabama	76

Quarterfinal - Marquette, MI; Elite Eight; March 8
NYIT	58
Northern Michigan	57

== National Finals - Springfield, Massachusetts ==
Location: Springfield Civic Center Hosts: American International College and Springfield College

National semifinals Final Four; March 14
Virginia Union	78
Florida Southern	71
North Alabama	66
NYIT	72

National Championship; March 15
Virginia Union	80
NYIT	74

- Third Place - Florida Southern 68, North Alabama 67

*denotes each overtime played

== All-tournament team ==
- Johnny Buckman (North Alabama)
- John Ebeling (Florida Southern)
- Larry Holmes (Virginia Union)
- Bobby Jones (New York Tech)
- Keith Valentine (Virginia Union)

== See also ==
- 1980 NCAA Division I basketball tournament
- 1980 NCAA Division III basketball tournament
- 1980 NAIA Basketball Tournament

== Sources ==
- 2010 NCAA Men's Basketball Championship Tournament Records and Statistics: Division II men's basketball Championship
- 1980 NCAA Division II men's basketball tournament jonfmorse.com
