= 1978 NAIA basketball tournament =

College basketball tournament

1978 NAIA men's basketball tournament
- Season: 1977–78
- Teams: 32
- Finals site: Kemper Arena; Kansas City, Missouri
- Champions: Grand Canyon (2 title, 2 title game, 2 Final Four)
- Runner-up: Kearney State (1 title game, 1 Final Four)
- Semifinalists: Quincy (1 Final Four); East Texas State (3 Final Four)
- Charles Stevenson Hustle Award: Randy Cipriano (Kearney State)
- MVP: Tom Ritzdorf (Kearney State)

The 1978 NAIA men's basketball tournament was held in March at Kemper Arena in Kansas City, Missouri, the United States. The 41st annual NAIA basketball tournament featured 32 teams playing in a single-elimination format.

== Awards and honors ==
- Leading scorer:
- Leading rebounder:
- Player of the Year: est. 1994

== 1978 NAIA bracket ==
First round	Second round
1	Winston-Salem State (N.C.)	77
-	Bethany Nazarene (Okla.)	61
1	Winston-Salem State	64
16	Briar Cliff	63
-	Maine Portland-Gorham	78
16	Briar Cliff (Iowa)	115
TOP TIER
9	Wisconsin–Parkside	72*
-	Dowling (N.Y.)	67
9	Kearney State	84*
-	Wisconsin–Parkside	80
-	Kearney State (Neb.)	70
8	Mercyhurst (Pa.)	69
5	Quincy (Ill.)	70
-	Southern Tech (Ga.)	63
5	Quincy	85
-	Erskine	84*
-	Erskine (S.C.)	74
12	Lake Superior State (Mich)	69
TOP TIER
13	Missouri Southern State	78
-	Mississippi Valley State	59
13	Missouri Southern State	69
4	Ouachita Baptist	56
-	Eastern Montana	67
4	Ouachita Baptist (Ark.)	76
3	Drury (Mo.)	90
-	Midwestern State (Tex.)	70
3	Drury	86
-	St. John's	79
-	St. John's (Minn.)	83
14	Central Washington	65
BOTTOM TIER
11	Birmingham Southern (Ala.)	92
-	LeMoyne-Owen (Tenn.)	77
11	Birmingham–Southern	72
6	East Texas State	78
-	Kansas Newman	65
6	East Texas State	81
7	Fairmont State(W.Virginia)	55
-	Westmont (CA)	65
-	Westmont	91**
-	Central State	92
-	Central State (Ohio)	76
10	Hampton Institute (Virginia)	64
BOTTOM TIER
15	Hawaii–Hilo	76
-	Franklin (Ind.)	74
15	Hawaii–Hilo	67
2	Grand Canyon	83
-	Cumberland (Ky.)	64
2	Grand Canyon (Ariz.)	70

Elite Eight
1	Winston-Salem State	76
-	Kearney State	89
5	Quincy	73
13	Missouri Southern State	66
3	Drury	77
6	East Texas State	79
-	Central State	82^
2	Grand Canyon	88

NAIA national semifinals
-	Kearney State	76
5	Quincy	74
6	East Texas State	69
2	Grand Canyon	74

NAIA national championship
-	Kearney State	75
2	Grand Canyon	79

- * denotes overtimes.
- ^ denotes 5 overtimes.

=== Third-place game ===
The third-place game featured the losing national semifinalist teams to determine 3rd and 4th places in the tournament. This game was played until 1988.

NAIA third-place game
5	Quincy	87
6	East Texas State	73

== See also ==
- 1978 NCAA Division I basketball tournament
- 1978 NCAA Division II basketball tournament
- 1978 NCAA Division III basketball tournament
