= 2001 NCAA Division III men's basketball tournament =

American collegiate men's basketball tournament (2001)

- Teams: 48
- Finals site: , Salem, Virginia
- Champions: Catholic (1st title)
- Runner-up: William Paterson (1st title game)
- Semifinalists: Illinois Wesleyan (3rd Final Four); Ohio Northern (2nd Final Four)
- Winning coach: Mike Lonergan (Catholic)
- MOP: Pat Maloney (Catholic)
- Attendance: 57,784

The 2001 NCAA Division III men's basketball tournament was the 27th annual single-elimination tournament to determine the national champions of National Collegiate Athletic Association (NCAA) men's Division III collegiate basketball in the United States.

The field contained forty-eight teams, and each program was allocated to one of four sectionals. All sectional games were played on campus sites, while the national semifinals, third-place final, and championship finals were contested at the Salem Civic Center in Salem, Virginia.

Catholic defeated William Paterson, 76–62, in the championship, clinching their first national title.

The Cardinals (28–5) were coached by Mike Lonergan. Lonergan would later coach at Division I programs Vermont and George Washington.

Pat Maloney, also from Catholic, was named Most Outstanding Player.

== Bracket ==
=== Top left sectional ===
First round
Salem State	96
Western New England	71
Carthage	83
Marian (WI)	65
Maryville (TN)	85
MacMurray	69
Calvin	89
Defiance	78

Second round
UMass Dartmouth	86
Salem State	64
Carthage	88
Wooster	80
Wittenberg	71
Maryville (TN)	51
Calvin	68
Ohio Northern	79

Sectional semifinals
UMass Dartmouth	41
Carthage	90
Wittenberg	66
Ohio Northern	82

Sectional finals
Carthage	64
Ohio Northern	66

=== Bottom left sectional ===
First round
Cabrini	96
Kings Point	106
Amherst	89
St. John Fisher	76
Catholic	82
CCNY	65
Colby–Sawyer	59
Brockport State	65

Second round
Wilkes	98
Kings Point	100*
Amherst	76
Clark (MA)	89
Widener	67
Catholic	69
Brockport State	77
Hobart	75

Sectional semifinals
Kings Point	69
Clark (MA)	75
Catholic	69
Brockport State	64

Sectional finals
Clark (MA)	78
Catholic	82

=== Top right sectional ===
First round
Benedictine (IL)	55
UW–Eau Claire	66
Linfield	85
Cal Lutheran	66
Washington–St. Louis	101
Aurora	84
Illinois Wesleyan	132
Grinnell	91

Second round
Chicago	74
UW–Eau Claire	67
Linfield	89
Lewis & Clark	101
Elmhurst	78
Washington–St. Louis	77
Illinois Wesleyan	65
Wartburg	60

Sectional semifinals
Chicago	62
Lewis & Clark	52
Elmhurst	60
Illinois Wesleyan	63

Sectional finals
Chicago	68
Illinois Wesleyan	77

=== Bottom right sectional ===
First round
Roanoke	70
SCAD	62
Gustavus Adolphus	69
Nebraska Wesleyan	60
Millsaps	45
Mississippi College	61
Hampden–Sydney	60
Gettysburg	52

Second round
Christopher Newport	84
Roanoke	54
Gustavus Adolphus	75
St. John's (MN)	84
McMurry	86
Mississippi College	82
Hampden–Sydney	65
William Paterson	84

Sectional semifinals
Christopher Newport	71
St. John's (MN)	65
McMurry	59
William Paterson	77

Sectional finals
Christopher Newport	75
William Paterson	86

=== National finals ===
- Site: Salem Civic Center, Salem, Virginia

National semifinals
Ohio Northern	77
Catholic	82
Illinois Wesleyan	52
William Paterson	67

National championship
Catholic	76
William Paterson	62
National third-place
Ohio Northern	73
Illinois Wesleyan	76

== See also ==
- 2001 NCAA Division I men's basketball tournament
- 2001 NCAA Division II men's basketball tournament
- 2001 NCAA Division III women's basketball tournament
- 2001 NAIA Division I men's basketball tournament
