= 1980 NAIA basketball tournament =

College basketball tournament

1980 NAIA men's basketball tournament
- Teams: 32
- Finals site: Kemper Arena; Kansas City, Missouri
- Champions: Cameron (1 title, 1 title game, 1 Fab Four)
- Runner-up: Alabama State (1 title game, 1 Fab Four)
- Semifinalists: Huron (1 Final Four); Wisconsin-Eau Claire (3 Final Four)
- Charles Stevenson Hustle Award: Terry DuPris (Huron)
- Chuck Taylor MVP: LeRoy Jackson (Cameron)

The 1980 NAIA men's basketball tournament was held in March at Kemper Arena in Kansas City, Missouri. The 43rd annual NAIA basketball tournament featured 32 teams playing in a single-elimination format. Cameron became the champions.

== Awards and honors ==
- Leading scorer:
- Leading rebounder:
- Player of the Year: est. 1994

== 1980 NAIA bracket ==
First round	Second round
1	Alabama State	103
-	Dowling (N.Y.)	57
1	Alabama State	103
-	South Carolina-Aiken	78
-	South Carolina-Aiken	74
16	Hampton Institute (Va.)	73
TOP TIER
9	Rockhurst (Mo.)	78
-	Defiance (Ohio)	69
9	Rockhurst	53
-	Central Arkansas	54
-	Central Arkansas	67
8	Augsburg (Minn)	61
5	Kearney State (Neb.)	85
-	Franklin (Ind.)	86
-	Franklin	71
-	Huron	73
-	Huron (S.D.)	82
12	Paul Quinn (Tex.)	72
TOP TIER
13	Hawaii-Hilo	70
-	Loras (Iowa)	72
-	Loras	71
-	Clarion State	79
-	Clarion State (Pa.)	83
4	Grand Canyon (Ariz.)	75
3	Cameron (Okla.)	72
-	Saginaw Valley (Mich.)	69
3	Cameron	120
14	St. Augustine's	86
-	Southern Tech (Ga.)	63
14	St. Augustine's (N.C.)	66
BOTTOM TIER
11	Fairmont State (W.Va.)	82
-	LeMoyne-Owen (Tenn.)	84*
-	LeMoyne-Owen	56
6	Abilene Christian	55
-	Illinois Wesleyan	55
6	Abilene Christian (Tex.)	75
7	Central Washington	89
-	Moorhead State (Minn.)	73
7	Central Washington	66
10	Biola	64
-	Franklin Pierce (N.H.)	64
10	Biola (Calif.)	76
BOTTOM TIER
15	Marymount (Kan.)	99*
-	Dillard (La.)	88
15	Marymount	49
2	Wisconsin-Eau Claire	56
-	Cumberland (Ky.)	61
2	Wisconsin-Eau Claire	84

Elite Eight
1	Alabama State	67
-	Central Arkansas	53
-	Huron	61
-	Clarion State	52
3	Cameron	76
-	LeMoyne-Owen	65
7	Central Washington	61
2	Wisconsin-Eau Claire	68*

NAIA national semifinals
1	Alabama State	72
-	Huron	58
3	Cameron	71
2	Wisconsin-Eau Claire	64

NAIA national championship
1	Alabama State	77
3	Cameron	84

- * denotes overtime.

=== Third-place game ===
The third-place game featured the losing national semifinalist teams to determine 3rd and 4th places in the tournament. This game was played until 1988.

NAIA third-place game
-	Huron	59
2	Wisconsin-Eau Claire	54

== See also ==
- 1980 NCAA Division I basketball tournament
- 1980 NCAA Division II basketball tournament
- 1980 NCAA Division III basketball tournament
