= 1978 NCAA Division II basketball tournament =

Edition of USA college basketball tournament

- Teams: 32
- Finals site: , Springfield, Missouri
- Champions: Cheyney State Wolves (1st title)
- Runner-up: Green Bay Phoenix (1st title game)
- Semifinalists: Eastern Illinois Panthers (2nd Final Four); Florida Tech Knights (1st Final Four)
- Winning coach: John Chaney (1st title)
- MOP: Andrew Fields (Cheyney)
- Attendance: 67,966

The 1978 NCAA Division II men's basketball tournament involved 32 schools playing in a single-elimination tournament to determine the national champion of men's NCAA Division II college basketball as a culmination of the 1977-78 NCAA Division II men's basketball season. It was won by Cheyney State of Pennsylvania and Cheyney's Andrew Fields was the Most Outstanding Player.

1978 NCAA Division II Men's sites - regionals (cyan) Quarterfinals (orange) Final Four (red)

== Regional participants ==
School	Outcome
Adelphi	Fourth Place
Cheyney State	Regional Champion
Hartwick	Third Place
Philadelphia College	Runner-up

School	Outcome
Bridgeport	Third Place
Bryant	Fourth Place
Merrimack	Runner-up
Sacred Heart	Regional Champion

School	Outcome
Augusta College	Fourth Place
Florida A&M	Runner-up
Florida Tech	Regional Champion
Livingston	Third Place

School	Outcome
Cal State Northridge	Runner-up
Puget Sound	Fourth Place
San Diego	Regional Champion
UC Davis	Fourth Place

School	Outcome
Eastern Illinois	Regional Champion
Indiana State–Evansville	Runner-up
Northern Kentucky	Fourth Place
St. Joseph's (IN)	Third Place

School	Outcome
Albany State	Third Place
Elizabeth City State	Regional Champion
NYIT	Fourth Place
Towson	Runner-up

School	Outcome
Columbus College	Fourth Place
Lincoln (MO)	Regional Champion
Mississippi College	Third Place
SW Missouri State	Runner-up

School	Outcome
Augustana (SD)	Runner-up
Chapman	Fourth Place
UW–Green Bay	Regional Champion
South Dakota State	Third Place

*denotes tie

== Regionals ==
=== East - Cheyney, Pennsylvania ===
Location: Cope Hall Host: Cheyney State College

Regional semifinals Round of 32; March 3
Cheyney State	78
Adelphi	64
Philadelphia College	73
Hartwick	62

Regional Final; Sweet 16; March 4
Cheyney State	73
Philadelphia College	60

- Third Place - Hartwick 77, Adelphi 74

=== New England - North Andover, Massachusetts ===
Location: Volpe Center Host: Merrimack College

Regional semifinals Round of 32; March 3
Merrimack	116
Bryant	91
Sacred Heart	73
Bridgeport	70

Regional Final; Sweet 16; March 4
Merrimack	83
Sacred Heart	84*

- Third Place - Bridgeport 89, Bryant 85

=== South - Orlando, Florida ===
Location: Florida Tech Fieldhouse Host: Florida Technological University

Regional semifinals Round of 32; March 3
Florida Tech	86
Augusta College	66
Florida A&M	72
Livingston	69

Regional Final; Sweet 16; March 4
Florida Tech	85
Florida A&M	78

- Third Place - Livingston 91, Augusta State 90

=== West - Northridge, California ===
Location: Matador Gymnasium Host: California State University, Northridge

Regional semifinals Round of 32; March 2
Cal State Northridge	79
UC Davis	73
San Diego	91
Puget Sound	85

Regional Final; Sweet 16; March 3
Cal State Northridge	67
San Diego	70

- Third Place - Puget Sound 96, UC Davis 73

=== Great Lakes - Charleston, Illinois ===
Location: Lantz Arena Host: Eastern Illinois University

Regional semifinals Round of 32; March 5
Eastern Illinois	100
St. Joseph's (IN)	93
Indiana State-Evansville	86
Northern Kentucky	78

Regional Final; Sweet 16; March 6
Eastern Illinois	79
Indiana State-Evansville	67

- Third Place - St. Joseph's 93, Northern Kentucky 87

=== South Atlantic - Towson, Maryland ===
Location: Towson Center Host: Towson State University

Regional semifinals Round of 32; March 3
Towson	106
Albany State	89
Elizabeth City State	64
NYIT	62

Regional Final; Sweet 16; March 4
Towson	73
Elizabeth City State	84

- Third Place - Albany State 81, NYIT 78

=== South Central - Springfield, Missouri ===
Location: Hammons Center Host: Southwest Missouri State University

Regional semifinals Round of 32; March 3
SW Missouri State	69
Columbus College	67
Lincoln (MO)	82
Mississippi College	73

Regional Final; Sweet 16; March 4
SW Missouri State	83
Lincoln	84

- Third Place - Mississippi College 96, Columbus State 75

=== North Central - Green Bay, Wisconsin ===
Location: Brown County Veterans Memorial Arena Host: University of Wisconsin at Green Bay

Regional semifinals Round of 32; March 2
UW–Green Bay	80
South Dakota State	57
Augustana (SD)	78
Chapman	66

Regional Final; Sweet 16; March 3
UW–Green Bay	72
Augustana (SD)	60

- Third Place - South Dakota State 61, Chapman 59

*denotes each overtime played

== National Quarterfinals ==
Quarterfinal - New Haven, CT; Elite Eight; March 11
Cheyney State	59
Sacred Heart	57

Quarterfinal - Orlando, FL; Elite Eight; March 11
Florida Tech	77
San Diego	71

Quarterfinal - Charleston, IL; Elite Eight; March 11
Eastern Illinois	84
Elizabeth City State	71

Quarterfinal - Green Bay, WI; Elite Eight; March 11
Lincoln (MO)	61
UW–Green Bay	63

== National Finals - Springfield, Missouri ==
Location: Hammons Center Host: Southwest Missouri State University

National semifinals Final Four; March 17
Cheyney State	79
Florida Tech	63
Eastern Illinois	43
UW–Green Bay	58

National Championship; March 18
Cheyney State	47
UW–Green Bay	40

- Third Place - Eastern Illinois 77, Florida Tech 67

*denotes each overtime played

== All-tournament team ==
- Tom Anderson (Wisconsin-Green Bay)
- Andrew Fields (Cheyney)
- Kenneth Hynson (Cheyney)
- Jerry Prather (Florida Tech†)
- Charlie Thomas (Eastern Illinois)

† Florida Tech is now known as University of Central Florida, as opposed to the current Florida Institute of Technology.

== See also ==
- 1978 NCAA Division I basketball tournament
- 1978 NCAA Division III basketball tournament
- 1978 NAIA Basketball Tournament

== Sources ==
- 2010 NCAA Men's Basketball Championship Tournament Records and Statistics: Division II men's basketball Championship
- 1978 NCAA Division II men's basketball tournament jonfmorse.com
