= 1979 NCAA Division II basketball tournament =

Edition of USA college basketball tournament

- Teams: 32
- Finals site: , Springfield, Missouri
- Champions: North Alabama Lions (1st title)
- Runner-up: Green Bay Phoenix (2nd title game)
- Semifinalists: Cheyney (PA) Wolves (2nd Final Four); Bridgeport Knights (1st Final Four)
- Winning coach: Bill Jones (1st title)
- MOP: Perry Oden (North Alabama)
- Attendance: 47,907

The 1979 NCAA Division II basketball tournament involved 32 schools playing in a single-elimination tournament to determine the national champion of men's NCAA Division II college basketball as a culmination of the 1978–79 NCAA Division II men's basketball season. It was won by the University of North Alabama and North Alabama's Perry Oden was the Most Outstanding Player.

1979 NCAA Division II Men's sites - regionals (cyan) Quarterfinals (orange) Final Four (red)

== Regional participants ==
School	Outcome
Eastern Illinois	Third Place
Northern Michigan	Fourth Place
St. Joseph's (IN)	Regional Champion
Wright State	Runner-up

School	Outcome
Assumption	Runner-up
Bentley	Third Place
Bridgeport	Regional Champion
Quinnipiac	Fourth Place

School	Outcome
Nicholls State	Regional Champion
Rollins	Runner-up
SE Missouri State	Third Place
NE Missouri State	Fourth Place

School	Outcome
Florida Southern	Fourth Place
North Alabama	Regional Champion
Tuskegee	Third Place
Valdosta State	Runner-up

School	Outcome
Cal State Northridge	Fourth Place
Puget Sound	Regional Champion
San Diego	Third Place
UC Riverside	Runner-up

School	Outcome
Green Bay	Regional Champion
Nebraska-Omaha	Third Place
North Dakota	Fourth Place
Northern Iowa	Runner-up

School	Outcome
Albany State	Third Place
Cheyney	Regional Champion
Hartwick	Runner-up
Philadelphia U	Fourth Place

School	Outcome
Mount St. Mary's	Third Place
Roanoke	Fourth Place
UMBC	Regional Champion
Virginia Union	Runner-up

*denotes tie

== Regionals ==
=== Great Lakes - Fairborn, Ohio ===
Location: Physical Education Building Host: Wright State University

Regional semifinals Round of 32; March 2
Wright State	75
Northern Michigan	66
St. Joseph's (IN)	76
Eastern Illinois	66

Regional Final; Sweet 16; March 3
Wright State	68
St. Joseph's	73

- Third Place - Eastern Illinois 65, Northern Michigan 58

=== New England - Waltham, Massachusetts ===
Location: Dana Center Host: Bentley College

Regional semifinals Round of 32; March 2
Bridgeport	92
Quinnipiac	75
Assumption	89
Bentley	78

Regional Final; Sweet 16; March 3
Bridgeport	85
Assumption	75

- Third Place - Bentley 104, Quinnipiac 93

=== South Central - Kirksville, Missouri ===
Location: Pershing Arena Host: Northeast Missouri State University

Regional semifinals Round of 32; March 2
Nicholls State	89
SE Missouri State	74
Rollins	97*
NE Missouri State	88

Regional Final; Sweet 16; March 3
Nicholls State	100
Rollins	87

- Third Place - SE Missouri State 86, NE Missouri State 82

=== South - Lakeland, Florida ===
Location: Jenkins Fieldhouse Host: Florida Southern College

Regional semifinals Round of 32; March 1
Valdosta State	102
Tuskegee	93
North Alabama	75
Florida Southern	67

Regional Final; Sweet 16; March 2
Valdosta State	101
North Alabama	110

- Third Place - Tuskegee 107, Florida Southern 102

=== West - Tacoma, Washington ===
Location: Memorial Fieldhouse Host: University of Puget Sound

Regional semifinals Round of 32; March 3
Puget Sound	81
Cal State Northridge	67
UC Riverside	62
San Diego	48

Regional Final; Sweet 16; March 4
Puget Sound	77
UC Riverside	52

- Third Place - San Diego 74, Cal State Northridge 69*

=== Central - Omaha, Nebraska ===
Location: UNO Fieldhouse Host: University of Nebraska at Omaha

Regional semifinals Round of 32; March 2
Northern Iowa	84
Nebraska-Omaha	72
Green Bay	63
North Dakota	48

Regional Final; Sweet 16; March 3
Northern Iowa	50
Green Bay	56

- Third Place - Nebraska-Omaha 86, North Dakota 75

=== East - Oneonta, New York ===
Location: Binder Physical Education Center Host: Hartwick College

Regional semifinals Round of 32; March 1
Cheyney	82
Albany State	61
Hartwick	49
Philadelphia U	48

Regional Final; Sweet 16; March 2
Cheyney	72
Hartwick	63

- Third Place - Albany State 72, Philadelphia U 61

=== South Atlantic - Catonsville, Maryland ===
Location: UMBC Fieldhouse Host: University of Maryland, Baltimore County

Regional semifinals Round of 32; March 2
UMBC	79
Mount St. Mary's	74
Virginia Union	68
Roanoke	67

Regional Final; Sweet 16; March 3
UMBC	58
Virginia Union	56

- Third Place - Mount St. Mary's 93, Roanoke 89

*denotes each overtime played

== National Quarterfinals ==
Quarterfinal - New Haven, CT; Elite Eight; March 10
St. Joseph's (IN)	82
Bridgeport	92

Quarterfinal - Thibodaux, LA; Elite Eight; March 10
Nicholls State	97
North Alabama	103

Quarterfinal - Green Bay, WI; Elite Eight; March 10
Puget Sound	53
Green Bay	65

Quarterfinal - Catonsville, MD; Elite Eight; March 10
Cheyney	65
UMBC	62

== National Finals - Springfield, Missouri ==
Location: Hammons Center Host: Southwest Missouri State University

National semifinals Final Four; March 16
Bridgeport	82
North Alabama	85
Green Bay	46
Cheyney	45

National Championship; March 17
North Alabama	64
Green Bay	50

- Third Place - Cheyney 81, Bridgeport 78

*denotes each overtime played

== All-tournament team ==
- Ron Darby (North Alabama)
- Carlton Hurdle (Bridgeport)
- Rory Lindgren (Wisconsin-Green Bay)
- Perry Oden (North Alabama)
- Ron Ripley (Wisconsin-Green Bay)

== See also ==
- 1979 NCAA Division I basketball tournament
- 1979 NCAA Division III basketball tournament
- 1979 NAIA Basketball Tournament

== Sources ==
- 2010 NCAA Men's Basketball Championship Tournament Records and Statistics: Division II men's basketball Championship
- 1979 NCAA Division II men's basketball tournament jonfmorse.com
