= 1989 NCAA Division III men's basketball tournament =

American collegiate men's basketball tournament (1989)

- Teams: 40
- Finals site: , Springfield, Ohio
- Champions: UW–Whitewater (2nd title)
- Runner-up: Trenton State (1st title game)
- Semifinalists: Southern Maine (1st Final Four); Centre (KY) (2nd Final Four)
- Winning coach: Dave Vander Meulen (UWW)
- MOP: Greg Grant (TSC)
- Attendance: 37,396

The 1989 NCAA Division III men's basketball tournament was the 15th annual single-elimination tournament to determine the national champions of National Collegiate Athletic Association (NCAA) men's Division III collegiate basketball in the United States.

Held during March 1989, the field included forty teams, an increase of eight from 1988. For the first time, the championship rounds were contested in Springfield, Ohio.

Wisconsin–Whitewater defeated Trenton State (now TCNJ), 94–86, to clinch their second NCAA Division III national title. The Warhawks' previous title came in 1984.

== Bracket ==
=== Regionals ===
First Round
North Adams State	80
Southern Maine	88
Salem State	84
Western Connecticut State	89

Regional Championship
Southern Maine	90
Western Connecticut State	88
Regional Third-place
North Adams State	112
Salem State	78

First Round
Franklin & Marshall	59
Susquehanna	54
Grove City	69
Washington College	82

Regional Championship
Franklin & Marshall	96
Washington College	76
Regional Third-place
Susquehanna	60
Grove City	74

First Round
Alfred	72
Staten Island	96

Regional semifinals
Buffalo State	76
Staten Island	51
Merchant Marine	68
Potsdam	80

Regional finals
Buffalo State	60
Potsdam	74
Regional Third-place
Staten Island	54
Merchant Marine	69

First Round
Shenandoah	74
Stockton State	64

Regional semifinals
Trenton State	96
Shenandoah	74
Hampden-Sydney	84
Jersey City State	94

Regional finals
Trenton State	78
Jersey City State	77
Regional Third-place
Shenandoah	78
Hampden-Sydney	80

First Round
Beloit	70
Monmouth (IL)	82

Regional semifinals
Wisconsin–Whitewater	112
Monmouth (IL)	76
Millikin	59
North Central (IL)	63

Regional finals
Wisconsin–Whitewater	95
North Central (IL)	83
Regional Third-place
Millikin	84
Monmouth (IL)	87

First Round
Allegheny	71
Hope	69
Calvin	69
Capital	64

Regional semifinals
Wittenberg	61
Allegheny	46
Otterbein	93
Calvin	90

Regional finals
Wittenberg	66
Otterbein	76
Regional Third-place
Allegheny	87
Calvin	89*

First Round
Gustavus Adolphus	62
Wartburg	78
Cal State San Bernardino	104
Pomona-Pitzer	108**

Regional semifinals
Nebraska Wesleyan	87
Wartburg	63
Stanislaus State	90
Pomona-Pitzer	78

Regional finals
Nebraska Wesleyan	66
Stanislaus State	76
Regional Third-place
Wartburg	67
Pomona-Pitzer	80

First Round
Christopher Newport	42
Rose–Hulman	56

Regional semifinals
Centre (KY)	88
Rose-Hulman	75
Rust	0
Washington St. Louis	2†

Regional finals
Centre	69
Washington St. Louis	68

- † indicates a forfeit

=== National finals ===
- Site: Springfield, Ohio

National quarterfinals
Southern Maine	79
Franklin & Marshall	71
Trenton State	78
Potsdam	62
UW–Whitewater	105
Otterbein	86
Centre (KY)	124**
Stanislaus State	123

National semifinals
Southern Maine	62
Trenton State	84
UW–Whitewater	88
Centre (KY)	81

National championship
Trenton State	86
UW–Whitewater	94
National third-place game
Southern Maine	81
Centre (KY)	70

== See also ==
- 1989 NCAA Division I men's basketball tournament
- 1989 NCAA Division II men's basketball tournament
- 1989 NCAA Division III women's basketball tournament
- 1989 NAIA Division I men's basketball tournament
