= 1976 NAIA basketball tournament =

College basketball tournament

1976 NAIA men's basketball tournament
- Season: 1975–76
- Teams: 32
- Finals site: Kemper Arena, Kansas City, Missouri
- Champions: Coppin State (1 title, 1 title game, 1 Final Four)
- Runner-up: Henderson State (1 title game, 1 Final Four)
- Semifinalists: Marymount (KS) (1 Final Four); Lincoln Memorial (1 Final Four)
- Charles Stevenson Hustle Award: Enos Mitchell (Henderson State)
- MVP: Joe Pace (Coppin State)

The 1976 NAIA men's basketball tournament was held in March at Kemper Arena in Kansas City, Missouri. The 39th annual NAIA basketball tournament featured 32 teams playing in a single-elimination format. This was the first tournament since 1969 tournament to feature four new teams to the NAIA semifinals. (It was the 6th time since 1937 this happened; previous years were the inaugural year 1937, 1945, 1947, 1965, 1969).

== Awards and honors ==
- Leading scorer:
- Leading rebounder:
- Player of the Year: est. 1994

== Bracket ==
First round	Second round
1	Fairmont State	58
-	Howard Payne	52
1	Fairmont State	75
16	Texas Southern	82
-	West Florida	59
16	Texas Southern	81
TOP TIER
9	Coppin State	78
-	Dowling	55
9	Coppin State	68
8	Wisconsin-Parkside	67
-	Franklin	61
8	Wisconsin-Parkside	74
5	Pikeville	84
-	Alabama-Huntsville	94
-	Alabama-Huntsville	70
-	Doane	59
-	Doane	80
12	Norfolk State	79
TOP TIER
13	Central Washington State	75
-	Briar Cliff	72
4	Marymount	83
13	Central Washington State	72
-	Eastern Montana	76
4	Marymount (KS)	93
3	Alcorn State	79
-	Lake Superior State	88'
14	Edinboro State	73
-	Lake Superior State	76
-	Gustavus Adolphus	73
14	Edinboro State	88
BOTTOM TIER
11	Illinois Wesleyan	100
-	Southwest Baptist (MO)	84
6	Henderson State	68
11	Illinois Wesleyan	66
-	Bethany Nazarene (OK)	67
6	Henderson State	80
7	Guilford (NC)	95
-	Lincoln Memorial	101
-	Lincoln Memorial	107
10	California Baptist	78
-	Husson (ME)	81
10	California Baptist	95
BOTTOM TIER
15	Newberry	89
-	Linfield	86
15	Newberry	65
2	Grand Canyon	58
-	Central State (OH)	52
2	Grand Canyon	57

Elite Eight
16	Texas Southern	77
9	Coppin State	88
-	Alabama-Huntsville	76
4	Marymount	78
-	Lake Superior State	61
6	Henderson State	78
-	Lincoln Memorial	75
15	Newberry	64

NAIA national semifinals
9	Coppin State	82
4	Marymount	81
6	Henderson State	80
-	Lincoln Memorial	79**

NAIA national championship
9	Coppin State	96
6	Henderson State	91

- * denotes double overtime.

=== Third-place game ===
The third-place game featured the losing teams from the national semifinalist to determine 3rd and 4th places in the tournament. This game was played until 1988.

NAIA third-place game
4	Marymount	78
-	Lincoln Memorial	75

== See also ==
- 1976 NCAA Division I basketball tournament
- 1976 NCAA Division II basketball tournament
- 1976 NCAA Division III basketball tournament
