= 1982 NCAA Division III men's basketball tournament =

American collegiate men's basketball tournament (1982)

- Teams: 32
- Finals site: , Grand Rapids, Michigan
- Champions: Wabash Little Giants (1st title)
- Runner-up: Potsdam State Bears (3rd title game)
- Semifinalists: Brooklyn Bulldogs (1st Final Four); Stanislaus State Warriors (1st Final Four)

The 1982 NCAA Division III men's basketball tournament was the eighth annual single-elimination tournament to determine the national champions of National Collegiate Athletic Association (NCAA) men's Division III collegiate basketball in the United States.

Held during March 1982, the field included 32 teams and the final championship rounds were contested at Calvin College in Grand Rapids, Michigan.

Wabash defeated defending champions SUNY Potsdam, 83–62, to claim their first national title.

== Bracket ==
=== Regionals ===
First round
Salem State	58*
WPI	57
Potsdam State	53
Clark (MA)	51

Regional Championship
Salem State	58
Potsdam State	59
Regional Third-place
WPI	57
Clark (MA)	99

First round
Ursinus	64
Scranton	62
Widener	61
Dickinson	53

Regional Championship
Ursinus	63
Widener	53
Regional Third-place
Scranton	91
Dickinson	77

First round
Staten Island	64
Buffalo	53
Brooklyn	50
Ithaca	47

Regional Championship
Staten Island	57
Brooklyn	60
Regional Third-place
Buffalo	73
Ithaca	74

First round
Roanoke	67
Montclair State	66
Upsala	54
Bethany (WV)	39

Regional Championship
Roanoke	81
Upsala	72
Regional Third-place
Montclair State	69
Bethany (WV)	68

First round
Augustana (IL)	70
Wisconsin–Milwaukee	63
Luther	66
Beloit	42

Regional Championship
Augustana (IL)	76
Luther	57
Regional Third-place
Wisconsin–Milwaukee	75
Beloit	73

First round
Hope	77
Wittenberg	60
Wabash	81
Ohio Northern	61

Regional Championship
Hope	70
Wabash	82
Regional Third-place
Wittenberg	52
Ohio Northern	80

First round
Stanislaus State	62
Whittier	60
Bishop	65
North Park	64

Regional Championship
Stanislaus State	84
Bishop	67
Regional Third-place
Whittier	66
North Park	68

First round
St. Andrews	91
Rose–Hulman	69
Capital	103*
Virginia Wesleyan	93

Regional Championship
St. Andrews	68
Capital	72
Regional Third-place
Rose–Hulman	88
Virginia Wesleyan	87

=== National finals ===
National quarterfinals
Potsdam State	62
Ursinus	44
Brooklyn	62
Roanoke	59
Augustana (IL)	51
Wabash	54
Stanislaus State	61
Capital	60

National semifinals
Potsdam State	50
Brooklyn	49
Wabash	68
Stanislaus State	64

National championship
Potsdam State	62
Wabash	83
National third-place game
Brooklyn	68
Stanislaus State	62

== See also ==
- 1982 NCAA Division III women's basketball tournament
- 1982 NCAA Division I men's basketball tournament
- 1982 NCAA Division II men's basketball tournament
- 1982 NAIA men's basketball tournament
