= 1976 NCAA Division III basketball tournament =

American collegiate men's basketball tournament (1976)

- Teams: 28
- Finals site: , Reading, Pennsylvania
- Champions: Scranton Royals (1st title)
- Runner-up: Wittenberg Tigers (1st title game)
- Semifinalists: Augustana (IL) Vikings (2nd Final Four); Plattsburgh State Cardinals (1st Final Four)
- Winning coach: Bob Bessoir (Scranton)
- MOP: Jack Maher (Scranton)
- Attendance: 4,000 (Championship game)

The 1976 NCAA Division III men's basketball tournament was the second annual single-elimination tournament to determine the men's collegiate basketball national champion of National Collegiate Athletic Association (NCAA) Division III, held during March 1976.

The tournament field included 28 teams, a decrease of two from 1975, and the national championship rounds were contested in Reading, Pennsylvania.

Scranton defeated Wittenberg, 60–57 (in overtime), to win their first national championship.

== Bracket ==
=== Regionals ===
First round
Rhode Island College	87
UMass Boston	65
SE Massachusetts	79
Suffolk	76

Regional Championship
Rhode Island College	89
SE Massachusetts	87
Regional Third-place
UMass Boston	108
Suffolk	101

First round
Plattsburgh State	68
RPI	65
CCNY	94
RIT	69

Regional Championship
Plattsburgh State	83
CCNY	81
Regional Third-place
RPI	74
RIT	81

First round
Wittenberg	88
Oberlin	66
Ashland	75
Hiram	74

Regional Championship
Wittenberg	61
Ashland	49
Regional Third-place
Oberlin	80
Hiram	77

First round
Miles	79
Sewanee	71
Transylvania	112
LeMoyne–Owen	92

Regional Championship
Miles	87
Transylvania	85
Regional Third-place
Sewanee	86
LeMoyne–Owen	73

First round
Widener	65
Mansfield State	54
Scranton	68
Grove City	45

Regional Championship
Scranton	70
Widener	65
Regional Third-place
Mansfield State	73
Grove City	59

First round
Shepherd	77
Glassboro State	62
Monmouth	97
Lynchburg	73

Regional Championship
Shepherd	79
Monmouth	71
Regional Third-place
Glassboro State	82
Lynchburg	62

First round
Augustana (IL)	83
Cornell College	77
Coe	70
Simpson	62

Regional Championship
Augustana (IL)	79
Coe	70
Regional Third-place
Cornell College	88
Simpson	96

=== National finals ===
- Site: Reading, Pennsylvania

National quarterfinals
Rhode Island College	80
Plattsburgh State	91
Wittenberg	101
Miles	75
Scranton	94
Shepherd	78

National semifinals
Plattsburgh State	58
Wittenberg	71
Scranton	76
Augustana (IL)	65

National championship
Wittenberg	57
Scranton	60*
National third-place game
Plattsburgh State	69
Augustana (IL)	93

== See also ==
- 1976 NCAA Division I basketball tournament
- 1976 NCAA Division II basketball tournament
- 1976 NAIA basketball tournament
