= 1978 NCAA Division III basketball tournament =

American collegiate men's basketball tournament (1978)

- Teams: 30
- Finals site: , Rock Island, Illinois
- Champions: North Park Vikings (1st title)
- Runner-up: Widener Pride (1st title game)
- Semifinalists: Stony Brook Seawolves (1st Final Four); Albion Britons (1st Final Four)
- MOP: Mike Harper (North Park)

The 1978 NCAA Division III men's basketball tournament was the fourth annual single-elimination tournament to determine the men's collegiate basketball national champion of National Collegiate Athletic Association (NCAA) Division III, held during March 1978.

The tournament field included 30 teams and the national championship rounds were contested in Rock Island, Illinois.

North Park defeated Widener, 69–57, in the championship game to win their first national title.

== Bracket ==
=== Regionals ===
First round
UMass Boston	93
Suffolk	90
Brandeis	79
Clark (MA)	77

Regional Championship
UMass Boston	68
Brandeis	69
Regional Third-place
Suffolk	87
Clark (MA)	89

First round
Stony Brook	68
SUNY Potsdam	62
St. Lawrence	65
Manhattanville	62

Regional Championship
Stony Brook	40
St. Lawrence	34
Regional Third-place
SUNY Potsdam	64
Manhattanville	60

First round
Widener	47
Upsala	39
Slippery Rock	70
Scranton	65

Regional Championship
Widener	63*
Slippery Rock	60
Regional Third-place
Upsala	77
Scranton	84

First round
Kean	84
Virginia Wesleyan	75
Washington and Lee	66
New Jersey City	65

Regional Championship
Kean	80
Washington and Lee	64
Regional Third-place
Virginia Wesleyan	102
New Jersey City	105

First round
Albion	72
Otterbein	67
Bethany (WV)	70
Rose–Hulman	68

Regional Championship
Albion	91
Bethany (WV)	74
Regional Third-place
Otterbein	99
Rose–Hulman	82

First round
Wooster	84
DePauw	74
Knoxville	86
Transylvania	67

Regional Championship
Wooster	76
Knoxville	84
Regional Third-place
DePauw	79
Transylvania	96

First round
North Park	78
Ripon	68
Minnesota–Morris	62
Central (IA)	59

Regional Championship
North Park	65
Minnesota–Morris	62
Regional Third-place
Ripon	66
Central (IA)	81

Regional Championship
Humboldt State	69
Ashland	68

=== National finals ===
- Site: Rock Island, Illinois

National quarterfinals
Brandeis	84
Stony Brook	98
Widener	55
Kean	49
Albion	78
Knoxville	77
North Park	79*
Humboldt State	76

National semifinals
Stony Brook	38
Widener	48
Albion	69
North Park	75

National championship
Widener	57
North Park	69
National third-place game
Stony Brook	78
Albion	87

== See also ==
- 1978 NCAA Division I basketball tournament
- 1978 NCAA Division II basketball tournament
- 1978 NAIA basketball tournament
