= 1977 NCAA Division III basketball tournament =

American collegiate men's basketball tournament (1977)

- Teams: 30
- Finals site: , Rock Island, Illinois
- Champions: Wittenberg Tigers (1st title)
- Runner-up: Oneonta State Red Dragons (1st title game)
- Semifinalists: Scranton Royals (2nd Final Four); Hamline Pipers (1st Final Four)
- Winning coach: Larry Hunter (Wittenberg)
- MOP: Rick White (Wittenberg)

The 1977 NCAA Division III men's basketball tournament was the third annual single-elimination tournament to determine the men's collegiate basketball national champion of National Collegiate Athletic Association (NCAA) Division III, held during March 1977.

The tournament field included 30 teams, an increase of two from 1976, and the national championship rounds were contested in Rock Island, Illinois.

Wittenberg, runners up from 1976, defeated Oneonta State, 79–66, in the championship game to win their first national title.

== Bracket ==
=== Regionals ===
First round
UMass Boston	83
Suffolk	73
Brandeis	67
Worcester State	65

Regional Championship
UMass Boston	95
Brandeis	69
Regional Third-place
Suffolk	81
Worcester State	79

First round
Oneonta State	71
Stony Brook	65
Albany (NY)	75
Ithaca	58

Regional Championship
Oneonta State	47
Albany (NY)	46
Regional Third-place
Stony Brook	74
Ithaca	63

First round
Hamline	44
Beloit	42
Central (IA)	73
Augustana (IL)	69

Regional Championship
Hamline	53
Central (IA)	50
Regional Third-place
Beloit	68
Augustana (IL)	78

First round
Methodist	85
Glassboro State	82
William Paterson	92
Washington and Lee	68

Regional Championship
Methodist	60
William Paterson	62
Regional Third-place
Glassboro State	103
Washington and Lee	87

First round
Scranton	59
Widener	51
Albright	51
Franklin & Marshall	49

Regional Championship
Scranton	75
Albright	60
Regional Third-place
Widener	71
Franklin & Marshall	89

First round
Rose–Hulman	85
Knoxville	75
Transylvania	85
Clark Atlanta	84

Regional Championship
Rose–Hulman	91*
Transylvania	85
Regional Third-place
Knoxville	73
Clark Atlanta	63

First round
Ashland	72
Muskingum	68
Wittenberg	82
Carnegie Mellon	68

Regional Championship
Ashland	67
Wittenberg	69*
Regional Third-place
Muskingum	74
Carnegie Mellon	71

Regional Championship
Nebraska Wesleyan	84
Bishop (TX)	83

=== National finals ===
- Site: Rock Island, Illinois

National quarterfinals
Oneonta State	72
UMass Boston	61
Hamline	82
Nebraska Wesleyan	60
Scranton	78
William Paterson	69
Rose–Hulman	57
Wittenberg	71

National semifinals
Oneonta State	61
Hamline	56
Scranton	52
Wittenberg	53*

National championship
Oneonta State	66
Wittenberg	79
National third-place game
Hamline	59
Scranton	60

== See also ==
- 1977 NCAA Division I basketball tournament
- 1977 NCAA Division II basketball tournament
- 1977 NAIA basketball tournament
