= 1979 NCAA Division III basketball tournament =

American collegiate men's basketball tournament (1979)

- Teams: 32
- Finals site: , Rock Island, Illinois
- Champions: North Park Vikings (2nd title)
- Runner-up: Potsdam Bears (1st title game)
- Semifinalists: Franklin & Marshall Diplomats (1st Final Four); Centre Colonels (1st Final Four)
- MOP: Mike Harper (North Park)

The 1979 NCAA Division III men's basketball tournament was the fifth annual single-elimination tournament, held during March 1979, to determine the national champions of National Collegiate Athletic Association (NCAA) men's Division III collegiate basketball in the United States.

The tournament field included 32 teams, an increase of two from 1978, with the national championship rounds being contested in Rock Island, Illinois.

Defending champions North Park defeated Potsdam, 66–62, in the championship game to repeat as national champions and claim their second overall title.

== Bracket ==
=== Regionals ===
First round
Framingham State	89
Rhode Island College	80
Clark (MA)	68**
Coast Guard	59

Regional Championship
Framingham State	73
Clark (MA)	85
Regional Third-place
Rhode Island College	71
Coast Guard	76

First round
St. Lawrence	64
Manhattanville	59
Potsdam	70
Stony Brook	65

Regional Championship
St. Lawrence	61
Potsdam	70
Regional Third-place
Manhattanville	61
Stony Brook	66

First round
Baldwin Wallace	70
Albion	66
Wittenberg	69
Allegheny	68

Regional Championship
Baldwin Wallace	68
Wittenberg	66
Regional Third-place
Albion	91
Allegheny	78

First round
Savannah State	82*
Albany (NY)	81
Centre (KY)	79
Lane	68

Regional Championship
Savannah State	54
Centre (KY)	82
Regional Third-place
Albany (NY)	85*
Lane	83

First round
Elizabethtown	58
Grove City	53
Franklin & Marshall	74*
Albright	63

Regional Championship
Elizabethtown	59
Franklin & Marshall	60
Regional Third-place
Grove City	79
Albright	73

First round
Jersey City State	85
Virginia Wesleyan	64
Upsala	115
Lynchburg	85

Regional Championship
Jersey City State	91
Upsala	81
Regional Third-place
Virginia Wesleyan	108
Lynchburg	84

First round
Central (IA)	85
Minnesota–Morris	57
North Park	63
Beloit	62

Regional Championship
Central (IA)	66
North Park	81
Regional Third-place
Minnesota–Morris	64
Beloit	72

First round
Chaminade	78
William Penn	69
Whittier	74**
Humboldt State	73

Regional Championship
Chaminade	78
Whittier	77
Regional Third-place
William Penn	91
Humboldt State	95

=== National finals ===
- Site: Rock Island, Illinois

National quarterfinals
Clark (MA)	72
Potsdam	89
Centre (KY)	68***
Baldwin Wallace	65
Franklin & Marshall	83
Jersey City State	72
North Park	95
Chaminade	74

National semifinals
Potsdam	67
Centre (KY)	63
Franklin & Marshall	73
North Park	83

National championship
Potsdam	62
North Park	66
National third-place game
Centre (KY)	65
Franklin & Marshall	66

== See also ==
- 1979 NCAA Division I basketball tournament
- 1979 NCAA Division II basketball tournament
- 1979 NAIA basketball tournament
