= 1975 NCAA Division III basketball tournament =

American collegiate men's basketball tournament (1975)

- Teams: 30
- Finals site: Albright College, Reading, Pennsylvania
- Champions: LeMoyne–Owen Magicians (1st title)
- Runner-up: Glassboro State Profs (1st title game)
- Semifinalists: Augustana (IL) Vikings (1st Final Four); Brockport State Golden Eagles (1st Final Four)
- Winning coach: Jerry Johnson (LeMoyne–Owen)
- MOP: Bob Newman (LeMoyne–Owen)
- Attendance: 1,800 (Championship game)

The 1975 NCAA Division III basketball tournament was the first annual single-elimination tournament to determine the men's collegiate basketball national champion of National Collegiate Athletic Association (NCAA) Division III. The tournament field included 30 teams and took place during March 1975, with the national championship rounds taking place in Reading, Pennsylvania.

LeMoyne–Owen defeated Glassboro State, 57–54, to win their first national championship.

== Bracket ==
=== Regionals ===
First round
Suffolk	80*
UMass Boston	75
Brandeis	94
Rhode Island College	84

Regional Championship
Suffolk	77
Brandeis	89
Regional Third-place
UMass Boston	114
Rhode Island College	96

First round
St. Lawrence	82
Albany	63
Brockport State	83
RPI	70

Regional Championship
St. Lawrence	77
Brockport State	103
Regional Third-place
Albany	55
RPI	72

First round
Mansfield State	85
Franklin & Marshall	70
Scranton	59
Widener	55

Regional Championship
Mansfield State	78
Scranton	65
Regional Third-place
Franklin & Marshall	50
Widener	69

First round
William Paterson	53
Methodist	52
Glassboro State	66
Washington and Lee	48

Regional Championship
William Paterson	59
Glassboro State	62
Regional Third-place
Methodist	71
Washington and Lee	58

First round
LeMoyne–Owen	92
Transylvania	84
Miles	80
Sewanee	60

Regional Championship
LeMoyne–Owen	92
Miles	76
Regional Third-place
Transylvania	68
Sewanee	66

First round
Marietta	75
Allegheny	67
Wittenberg	71
Hiram	49

Regional Championship
Marietta	70
Wittenberg	85
Regional Third-place
Allegheny	78
Hiram	86

First round
Wartburg	79
Coe	78
Augustana (IL)	67
Knox	66

Regional Championship
Wartburg	61
Augustana (IL)	62
Regional Third-place
Coe	83
Knox	72

Regional Championship
Hamline	48
Doane	47

=== National finals ===
- Site: Reading, Pennsylvania

National quarterfinals
Brandeis	76
Brockport State	96
Mansfield State	49
Glassboro State	60
LeMoyne–Owen	68
Wittenberg	65
Augustana (IL)	48
Hamline	42

National semifinals
Brockport State	68
Glassboro State	76
LeMoyne–Owen	84
Augustana (IL)	71

National championship
Glassboro State	54
LeMoyne–Owen	57
National third-place game
Brockport State	71
Augustana (IL)	78

== See also ==
- 1975 NCAA Division I basketball tournament
- 1975 NCAA Division II basketball tournament
- 1975 NAIA Basketball Tournament
