= 1987 NCAA Division III men's basketball tournament =

American collegiate men's basketball tournament (1987)

- Finals site: , Grand Rapids, Michigan
- Champions: North Park Vikings (5th title)
- Runner-up: Clark (MA) Cougars (2nd title game)
- Semifinalists: Wittenberg Tigers (6th Final Four); Stockton State Ospreys (1st Final Four)
- Winning coach: Bosco Djurickovic (NPU)
- MOP: Michael Starks (NPU)
- Attendance: 38,542

The 1987 NCAA Division III men's basketball tournament was the 13th annual single-elimination tournament to determine the national champions of National Collegiate Athletic Association (NCAA) men's Division III collegiate basketball in the United States.

Held during March 1987, the field included thirty-two teams and the final championship rounds were contested at Calvin College in Grand Rapids, Michigan.

North Park defeated Clark (MA), 106–100, to claim their record-fifth NCAA Division III national title.

== Bracket ==
=== Regionals ===
First Round
SE Massachusetts	110
North Adams State	82
Clark	108
Norwich	76

Regional Championship
SE Massachusetts	80
Clark	88
Regional Third-place
North Adams State	70
Norwich	89

First Round
Ithaca	53
Potsdam	56
Nazareth	93
Stony Brook	81

Regional Championship
Potsdam	86
Nazareth	63
Regional Third-place
Ithaca	77
Stony Brook	95

First Round
Scranton	56
Widener	67
Allegheny	59
Franklin & Marshall	77

Regional Championship
Widener	53
Franklin & Marshall	50
Regional Third-place
Scranton	97*
Allegheny	90

First Round
Roanoke	64
Stockton State	67
Jersey City State	93
Stanislaus State	101

Regional Championship
Stockton State	88
Stanislaus State	80
Regional Third-place
Roanoke	96
Jersey City State	82

First Round
Rust	68
Washington St. Louis	69
Centre (KY)	62
North Carolina Wesleyan	64

Regional Championship
Washington St. Louis	64
North Carolina Wesleyan	66
Regional Third-place
Rust	72
Centre (KY)	65

First Round
Hope	80
Otterbein	95
Calvin	69
Wittenberg	70

Regional Championship
Otterbein	71
Wittenberg	78
Regional Third-place
Hope	90
Calvin	92*

First Round
Gustavus Adolphus	70
Nebraska Wesleyan	59
Claremont Mudd Scripps	81
Wartburg	91

Regional Championship
Gustavus Adolphus	72
Wartburg	74
Regional Third-place
Nebraska Wesleyan	60
Claremont Mudd Scripps	75

First Round
North Park	91
Ripon	81
DePauw	61
Illinois Wesleyan	69

Regional Championship
North Park	82
Illinois Wesleyan	77
Regional Third-place
Ripon	66
DePauw	77

=== National finals ===
National quarterfinals
Clark	65
Potsdam	63
Widener	65
Stockton State	68*
North Carolina Wesleyan	64
Wittenberg	77
Wartburg	63
North Park	88

National semifinals
Clark	77
Stockton State	71
Wittenberg	70
North Park	75

National championship
Clark	100
North Park	106
National third-place game
Stockton State	80
Wittenberg	82*

== All tournament team ==
- Michael Starks, North Park
- Mike Barach, North Park
- Steve Iannarino, Wittenberg
- Kermit Sharp, Clark (MA)
- Donald Ellison, Stockton State

== See also ==
- 1987 NCAA Division I men's basketball tournament
- 1987 NCAA Division II men's basketball tournament
- 1987 NAIA men's basketball tournament
- 1987 NCAA Division III women's basketball tournament
