= 1991 NCAA Division III men's basketball tournament =

American collegiate men's basketball tournament (1991)

- Finals site: , Springfield, Ohio
- Champions: Wisconsin–Platteville (1st title)
- Runner-up: Franklin & Marshall (1st title game)
- Semifinalists: Otterbein (2nd Final Four); Ramapo (1st Final Four)
- Winning coach: Bo Ryan (UWP)
- MOP: Shawn Frison (UWP)
- Attendance: 44,538

The 1991 NCAA Division III men's basketball tournament was the 17th annual single-elimination tournament to determine the national champions of National Collegiate Athletic Association (NCAA) men's Division III collegiate basketball in the United States.

Held during March 1991, the field included forty teams. The championship rounds were contested in Springfield, Ohio.

Wisconsin–Platteville (28–3) defeated Franklin & Marshall, 81–74, to clinch their first NCAA Division III national title.

== Bracket ==
=== Top left sectional ===
First round
Glassboro State	88
NJIT	80

Second round
Salem State	83
Western Connecticut	62
Ramapo	87
Salisbury State	75
SE Massachusetts	87
Southern Maine	76
Glassboro State	66
Kean	85

Sectional semifinals
Salem State	98
Ramapo	101
SE Massachusetts	80
Kean	105

Sectional finals
Ramapo	80
Kean	77

=== Bottom left sectional ===
First round
Dickinson	60
Johns Hopkins	65
RPI	69
Rochester	73

Second round
Franklin & Marshall	65
Johns Hopkins	56
Buffalo State	75
Geneseo	83
King's (PA)	62
Scranton	85
Rochester	71
Stony Brook	67

Sectional semifinals
Franklin & Marshall	94
Geneseo	63
Scranton	62
Rochester	64*

Sectional finals
Franklin & Marshall	76*
Rochester	73

=== Top right sectional ===
First round
Illinois Wesleyan	63
Ripon	65
Emory & Henry	88
Shenandoah	69
Maryville (TN)	73
Washington St. Louis	76

Second round
Wisconsin–Platteville	96
Ripon	77
Emory & Henry	71
Christopher Newport	81
Benedictine (IL)	76
DePauw	72
Washington St. Louis	53
Randolph-Macon	77

Sectional semifinals
Wisconsin–Platteville	110
Christopher Newport	50
Benedictine (IL)	74
Randolph-Macon	62

Sectional finals
Wisconsin–Platteville	101
Benedictine (IL)	65

=== Bottom right sectional ===
First round
Calvin	85
Wooster	68
Bethel (MN)	77
Central (IA)	88

Second round
Hope	84
Calvin	87*
Central (IA)	73
Wartburg	76
Otterbein	88
Wittenberg	62
Claremont-Mudd-Scripps	72
UC San Diego	76

Sectional semifinals
Calvin	76
Wartburg	71
Otterbein	108
UC San Diego	95

Sectional finals
Calvin	73
Otterbein	75

=== National finals ===
- Site: Springfield, Ohio

National Semifinals
Ramapo	56
Franklin & Marshall	106
UW–Platteville	96
Otterbein	94

National Championship
Franklin & Marshall	74
UW–Platteville	81
National Third-place
Ramapo	84
Otterbein	113

== All-tournament team ==
- Shawn Frison, Wisconsin–Platteville
- James Bradley, Otterbein
- Robby Jeter, Wisconsin–Platteville
- Will Lasky, Franklin & Marshall
- David Wilding, Franklin & Marshall

== See also ==
- 1991 NCAA Division I men's basketball tournament
- 1991 NCAA Division II men's basketball tournament
- 1991 NCAA Division III women's basketball tournament
- 1991 NAIA Division I men's basketball tournament
