= 1990 NCAA Division III men's basketball tournament =

American collegiate men's basketball tournament (1990)

- Finals site: , Springfield, Ohio
- Champions: Rochester Yellowjackets (1st title)
- Runner-up: DePauw Tigers (1st title game)
- Semifinalists: Washington College Shoremen (1st Final Four); Calvin Knights (1st Final Four)
- Winning coach: Mike Neer (UR)
- MOP: Chris Fite (UR)
- Attendance: 46,365

The 1990 NCAA Division III men's basketball tournament was the 16th annual single-elimination tournament to determine the national champions of National Collegiate Athletic Association (NCAA) men's Division III collegiate basketball in the United States.

Held during March 1990, the field included forty teams. The championship rounds were again contested in Springfield, Ohio.

Rochester defeated DePauw, 43–42, to clinch their first NCAA Division III national title.

== Bracket ==
=== Top left sectional ===
First round
Southern Maine | 74
Western New England | 52
Nazareth | 54
Rochester (NY) | 73

Second round
North Adams State | 88
Southern Maine | 78
Albany | 85
Potsdam | 75
Salem State | 112
SE Massachusetts | 122
Buffalo State | 57
Rochester | 62

Sectional semifinals
North Adams State | 69
Albany | 66
SE Massachusetts | 80
Rochester | 92

Sectional finals
North Adams State | 47
Rochester | 50
Sectional third place
Albany | 91
SE Massachusetts | 92

=== Bottom left sectional ===
First round
FDU Florham | 72
Johns Hopkins | 90
Hunter | 84
Stockton State | 100

Second round
Franklin & Marshall | 78
Johns Hopkins | 85
Trenton State | 68
Western Connecticut | 69
King's (PA) | 83
Washington College | 85
Stockton State | 73
Jersey City State | 71

Sectional semifinals
Johns Hopkins | 69
Western Connecticut | 79
Washington College | 89
Stockton State | 88

Sectional finals
Western Connecticut | 104
Washington College | 107*
Sectional third place
Johns Hopkins | 80
Stockton State | 74

=== Top right sectional ===
First round
Muskingum | 70
Otterbein | 64
Christopher Newport | 80
Emory & Henry | 91

Second round
Wittenberg | 69
Muskingum | 50
Averett | 91*
Randolph-Macon | 78
Calvin | 95
Hope | 68
Emory & Henry | 81
Emory | 91

Sectional semifinals
Wittenberg | 86
Averett | 64
Calvin | 80
Emory | 73

Sectional finals
Wittenberg | 59
Calvin | 63
Sectional third place
Averett | 93
Emory | 102

=== Bottom right sectional ===
First round
Illinois Wesleyan | 83
North Park | 68
Claremont-Mudd-Scripps | 77
Dubuque | 84

Second round
North Central (IL) | 63
Illinois Wesleyan | 71
Nebraska Wesleyan | 77
UC San Diego | 75
DePauw | 71
Monmouth (IL) | 69
Dubuque | 55
St. Thomas (MN) | 65

Sectional semifinals
Illinois Wesleyan | 85
Nebraska Wesleyan | 63
DePauw | 75**
St. Thomas (MN) | 69

Sectional finals
Illinois Wesleyan | 65
DePauw | 68
Sectional third place
Nebraska Wesleyan | 71
St. Thomas (MN) | 77

=== National finals ===
- Site: Springfield, Ohio

National Semifinals
Rochester | 86
Washington College | 70
Calvin | 79
DePauw | 82

National Championship
Rochester | 43
DePauw | 42
National Third-place
Washington College | 87
Calvin | 86

== See also ==
- 1990 NCAA Division I men's basketball tournament
- 1990 NCAA Division II men's basketball tournament
- 1990 NCAA Division III women's basketball tournament
- 1990 NAIA Division I men's basketball tournament
