= St. Andrews Knights =

- University: St. Andrews University
- Nickname: Knights
- Association: NAIA
- Conference: AAC (primary); Mid-South (affiliate)
- Athletic director: Elizabeth Burris
- Location: Laurinburg, North Carolina
- Varsity teams: 16 (8 men's, 6 women's, 2 co-ed)
- Football stadium: Knights Football Field
- Basketball arena: Harris Court
- Baseball stadium: Clark Field
- Softball stadium: Knights Softball Field
- Soccer stadium: Knights Soccer/Lacrosse Field
- Aquatics center: O'Herron Pool
- Lacrosse stadium: Knights Soccer/Lacrosse Field
- Golf course: Scotch Meadows Country Club
- Colors: SAU Blue, White, Black, and SAU Gray
- Website: www.sauknights.com/landing/index
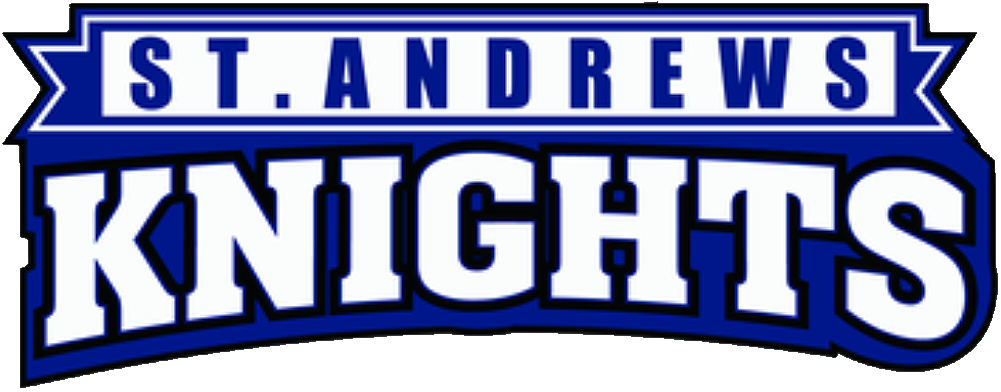

The St. Andrews Knights were the athletic teams that represented St. Andrews University, located in Laurinburg, North Carolina, in intercollegiate sports in the National Association of Intercollegiate Athletics (NAIA). The Knights have primarily competed in the Appalachian Athletic Conference (AAC) since the 2012–13 academic year. The Knights previously competed in Conference Carolinas at the Division II level of the National Collegiate Athletic Association (NCAA) from 1988–89 to 2011–12. The university transitioned to the NAIA after 23 years in the NCAA at the end of the 2011–12 academic year.

In May 2023, citing difficulty in fielding teams, the university eliminated five sports: women's golf, and men's and women's cross-country and track and field.

The institution closed on May 5, 2025, due to financial issues.

== Conference affiliations ==
=== NCAA ===
- Conference Carolinas (1988–2012)

=== NAIA ===
- Appalachian Athletic Conference (2012–2025)

== Varsity teams ==
St. Andrews currently sponsored 16 varsity sports:

| Men's sports | Women's sports |
|---|---|
| Baseball | Basketball |
| Basketball | Beach volleyball |
| Football | Lacrosse |
| Golf | Soccer |
| Lacrosse | Softball |
| Soccer | Volleyball |
| Volleyball | Wrestling |
| Wrestling | |
Co-ed sports
Esports

=== Equestrian ===
In addition to the Knights NAIA programs, St. Andrews sponsored an extensive equestrian program. The St. Andrews Equestrian Team won American National Riding Commission (ANRC) national champions in 1996, 1997, 2000, 2001, 2002, and 2007; in addition the Knights finished Reserve Champion at the ANRC Intercollegiate National Championships in 2004 and 2006. The program won two Intercollegiate Horse Show Association (IHSA) Zone Hunter Seat All-Star Championships in 2002 and 2004; six IHSA Hunter Seat Reserve Regional Team Championships in 2002, 2003, 2004, 2005, 2006, and 2007; six IHSA Western Regional Team Championships in 2006, 2007, 2008, 2009, 2010, and 2011; and qualified for the Intercollegiate Dressage Association (IDA) National Final eight times (2002, 2003, 2004, 2005, 2007, 2009, and 2010).
