= 1988 NCAA Division III men's basketball tournament =

American collegiate men's basketball tournament (1988)

- Finals site: , Grand Rapids, Michigan
- Champions: Ohio Wesleyan Battling Bishops (1st title)
- Runner-up: Scranton Royals (3rd title game)
- Semifinalists: Hartwick Hawks (1st Final Four); Nebraska Wesleyan Prairie Wolves (3rd Final Four)
- Winning coach: Gene Mehaffey (OWU)
- MOP: Scott Tedder (OWU)
- Attendance: 34,373

The 1988 NCAA Division III men's basketball tournament was the 14th annual single-elimination tournament to determine the national champions of National Collegiate Athletic Association (NCAA) men's Division III collegiate basketball in the United States.

Held during March 1988, the field included thirty-two teams and the final championship rounds were contested at Calvin College in Grand Rapids, Michigan.

Ohio Wesleyan defeated Scranton, 92–70, to claim their first NCAA Division III national title.

== Bracket ==
=== Regionals ===
'First Round
North Adams State	75
SE Massachusetts	91
Clark (MA)	82
Southern Maine	79

Regional Championship
SE Massachusetts	85
Clark	86
Regional Third-place
North Adams State	60
Southern Maine	84

First Round
Cabrini	51
Scranton	59
Allegheny	61
Franklin & Marshall	63

Regional Championship
Scranton	61
Franklin & Marshall	47
Regional Third-place
Cabrini	66
Allegheny	93

First Round
Buffalo State	73
Potsdam	70
Hartwick	80
Staten Island	73

Regional Championship
Buffalo State	53
Hartwick	54
Regional Third-place
Potsdam	93
Staten Island	80

First Round
Bridgewater (VA)	50
Trenton State	87
Emory & Henry	72
Stockton State	59

Regional Championship
Trenton State	82
Emory & Henry	72
Regional Third-place
Bridgewater (VA)	70
Stockton State	72

First Round
Illinois Wesleyan	99
Monmouth (IL)	74
Millikin	101
Wisconsin–Whitewater	86

Regional Championship
Illinois Wesleyan	91
Millikin	74
Regional Third-place
Monmouth (IL)	93
Wisconsin–Whitewater	103

First Round
Ohio Northern	70
Ohio Wesleyan	77
Hope	80
Muskingum	75

Regional Championship
Ohio Wesleyan	110**
Hope	107
Regional Third-place
Ohio Northern	69
Muskingum	43

First Round
Nebraska Wesleyan	72
Saint John's (MN)	64
Claremont Mudd Scripps	78
Dubuque	80

Regional Championship
Nebraska Wesleyan	69
Dubuque	64
Regional Third-place
Saint John's (MN)	92
Claremont Mudd Scripps	75

First Round
Centre (KY)	73
Rust	67
Christopher Newport	62
Washington St. Louis	64

Regional Championship
Centre (KY)	59
Washington St. Louis	74
Regional Third-place
Rust	74
Christopher Newport	63

=== National finals ===
National quarterfinals
Clark	55
Scranton	73
Hartwick	84
Trenton State	69
Illinois Wesleyan	103
Ohio Wesleyan	106
Nebraska Wesleyan	58
Washington St. Louis	55

National semifinals
Scranton	84
Hartwick	61
Ohio Wesleyan	87
Nebraska Wesleyan	71

National championship
Scranton	70
Ohio Wesleyan	92
National third-place game
Hartwick	70
Nebraska Wesleyan	73

== See also ==
- 1988 NCAA Division I men's basketball tournament
- 1988 NCAA Division II men's basketball tournament
- 1988 NCAA Division III women's basketball tournament
- 1988 NAIA men's basketball tournament
