= 1984 NCAA Division III men's basketball tournament =

American collegiate men's basketball tournament (1984)

- Teams: 32
- Finals site: , Grand Rapids, Michigan
- Champions: Wisconsin–Whitewater Warhawks (1st title)
- Runner-up: Clark (MA) Cougars (1st title game)
- Semifinalists: DePauw Tigers (1st Final Four); Upsala Vikings (2nd Final Four)
- Winning coach: Dave Vander Meulen (UWW)
- MOP: Andre McKoy (UWW)
- Attendance: 30,311

The 1984 NCAA Division III men's basketball tournament was the tenth annual single-elimination tournament to determine the national champions of National Collegiate Athletic Association (NCAA) men's Division III collegiate basketball in the United States.

Held during March 1984, the field included 32 teams and the final championship rounds were contested at Calvin College in Grand Rapids, Michigan.

Wisconsin–Whitewater defeated Clark (MA), 103–86, to claim their first NCAA Division III national title.

== Bracket ==
=== Regionals ===
First round
Framingham State	94
Hiram	76
Clark (MA)	88
Norwich	84

Regional Championship
Framingham State	78
Clark (MA)	84
Regional Third-place
Hiram	105
Norwich	103

First round
Staten Island	64
St. Lawrence	53
Nazareth (NY)	67
Buffalo State	50

Regional Championship
Staten Island	68
Nazareth (NY)	74
Regional Third-place
St. Lawrence	70
Buffalo State	83

First round
Roanoke	94
Washington College	74
Upsala	44
William Paterson	43

Regional Championship
Roanoke	62
Upsala	63
Regional Third-place
Washington College	78
William Paterson	83

First round
Montclair State	78
Scranton	60
Susquehanna	74
Franklin & Marshall	58

Regional Championship
Montclair State	68
Susquehanna	62
Regional Third-place
Scranton	86
Franklin & Marshall	82

First round
Nebraska Wesleyan	62
Claremont-Mudd-Scripps	47
Potsdam State	68
Luther	57

Regional Championship
Nebraska Wesleyan	87
Potsdam State	72
Regional Third-place
Claremont-Mudd-Scripps	84
Luther	83

First round
St. Norbert	69
North Central (IL)	56
Wisconsin–Whitewater	75
Illinois Wesleyan	67

Regional Championship
St. Norbert	84
Wisconsin–Whitewater	87***
Regional Third-place
North Central (IL)	82
Illinois Wesleyan	77

First round
Heidelberg	73
Hope	69
DePauw	62
Capital	60

Regional Championship
Heidelberg	53
DePauw	54*
Regional Third-place
Hope	77
Capital	83

First round
LeMoyne-Owen	88
Millsaps	69
North Carolina Wesleyan	70
Centre (KY)	62

Regional Championship
LeMoyne-Owen	71
North Carolina Wesleyan	68
Regional Third-place
Millsaps	65
Centre (KY)	56

=== National finals ===
National quarterfinals
Clark (MA)	90
Nazareth (NY)	84
Upsala	57
Montclair State	56
Nebraska Wesleyan	54
Wisconsin–Whitewater	65
DePauw	98
LeMoyne-Owen	49

National semifinals
Clark (MA)	69
Upsala	68
Wisconsin–Whitewater	85
DePauw	69

National championship
Clark (MA)	86
Wisconsin–Whitewater	103
National third-place game
Upsala	67
DePauw	73

== See also ==
- 1984 NCAA Division I men's basketball tournament
- 1984 NCAA Division II men's basketball tournament
- 1984 NCAA Division III women's basketball tournament
- 1984 NAIA men's basketball tournament
