= Calvin Knights =

- University: Calvin University
- Conference: MIAA (primary); MCVL (men's volleyball)
- NCAA: Division III
- Varsity teams: 22
- Basketball arena: Van Noord Arena
- Soccer stadium: Zuidema Field
- Aquatics center: Venema Aquatic Center
- Lacrosse stadium: Zuidema Field
- Tennis venue: Strikwerda Tennis Center
- Outdoor track and field venue: Zuidema Field
- Volleyball arena: Van Noord Arena
- Mascot: Joust the Knight
- Nickname: Knights
- Colors: Maroon and gold
- Website: calvinknights.com

The Calvin Knights are the Calvin University athletics teams. Calvin University fields 11 men's and 11 women's varsity intercollegiate teams that participate in the Michigan Intercollegiate Athletic Association at the National Collegiate Athletic Association Division III level. Men's volleyball is the newest varsity sport, having been added for the 2024 season (2023–24 school year); since the MIAA sponsors volleyball only for women, that team plays in the single-sport Midwest Collegiate Volleyball League.

Between 1920–21 and 1926–27, the school's athletic teams were known as the "Calvin-ites. The first reference to the "Calvin Knights" appeared in 1926–27. In addition to their long-standing participation in the MIAA, the Calvin Knights have competed at the national level in various sports, earning conference titles and participating in national tournaments. The university has invested in athletic facilities, including the Spoelhof Fieldhouse Complex, which opened in 2009 and serves as the primary venue for several of the university's sports programs. Calvin’s athletic programs incorporate elements of faith, academics, and competition, consistent with the university’s stated mission.

== Teams ==
There are currently both men's and women's varsity athletic teams participating in basketball, football, cross country, golf, lacrosse, soccer, swimming and diving, (Note: The NCAA considers swimming and diving to be a single sport, holding a combined championship event for the two disciplines in each of its three divisions.) tennis, track and field (indoor and outdoor), (Note: The NCAA considers indoor and outdoor track & field to be two separate sports. It holds indoor championships in its winter season and outdoor championships in its spring season.) and volleyball. There are also men's varsity baseball and women's varsity softball teams.

Calvin also fields a club-level men's ice hockey team in the American Collegiate Hockey Association.

Men's sports	Women's sports
Baseball	Acrobatics
Basketball	Basketball
Cross country	Cross country
Football	Golf
Golf	Lacrosse
Ice hockey	Soccer
Lacrosse	Softball
Soccer	Swimming
Swimming	Tennis
Tennis	Track and field
Track and field	Thriatlon
Volleyball	Volleyball

== Facilities ==
- Spoelhof Fieldhouse Complex is home to the combined health, physical education, recreation, dance and sport department. In Spring 2007, the college began a $50 million construction project to renovate and expand the Calvin Fieldhouse. The fieldhouse reopened in Spring 2009 as the Spoelhof Fieldhouse Complex. The 362,000 square feet (33,600 m^{2}) facility includes a new 5,000-seat arena (Van Noord Arena) which is currently the largest arena in a Division III school, an Olympic-regulation swimming pool (Venema Aquatic Center) which seats about 550, a tennis and track center (Huizenga Tennis and Track Center) containing 4 tennis courts and a 200-meter track, 14,000 square feet (1,300 m^{2}) of weight training rooms and a custom made rock climbing wall.
- Zuidema Field: home to the men's and women's soccer, lacrosse, and track and field teams.
- Hoogenboom Health and Recreation Center: contains the original renovated gym that is now used for basketball, volleyball, PE classes, intramurals, and many concerts. The Hoogenboom Center also has two dance studios as well as racquetball courts and exercise science laboratories.

== Calvin–Hope rivalry ==
In 2005, ESPN polled its staff about what they thought were the nation's greatest college basketball rivalries, and the Calvin–Hope rivalry was voted fourth in all college basketball.

== Championships ==
Calvin has won 11 NCAA Division III national championships and one club sport (ACHA Division III) national championship.

Year	Sport	Assoc. /Div.
2016	Women's Volleyball	NCAA III
2013	Women's Volleyball	NCAA III
2010	Women's Volleyball	NCAA III
2006	Men's Cross Country	NCAA III
2004	Men's Cross Country	NCAA III
2004	Men's Ice Hockey	ACHA III
2003	Men's Cross Country	NCAA III
2000	Men's Cross Country	NCAA III
2000	Men's Basketball	NCAA III
1999	Women's Cross Country	NCAA III
1998	Women's Cross Country	NCAA III
1992	Men's Basketball	NCAA III
