= 1996 in basketball =

The following are the basketball events of the year 1996 throughout the world.

== Championships ==
=== 1996 Olympics ===
- Men: United States of America 96, Yugoslavia 69
- Women: United States of America 111, Australia 87

=== Professional ===
- Men
  - 1996 NBA Finals: Chicago Bulls over the Seattle SuperSonics 4-2. MVP: Michael Jordan
    - 1996 NBA Playoffs
    - 1995-96 NBA season
    - 1996 NBA draft
    - 1996 NBA All-Star Game
  - Eurobasket: None.
- Women
  - Eurobasket Women: None

=== College ===
- Men
  - NCAA
    - Division I: Kentucky 76, Syracuse 67
    - NIT: University of Nebraska–Lincoln def. St. Joseph's University
    - Division II: Fort Hays State University 70, Northern Kentucky University 63
    - Division III: Rowan University 100, Hope College 93
  - NAIA
    - Division I Oklahoma City University 86, Georgetown (Ky.) 80
    - Division II Albertson (Idaho) 81, Whitworth (Wash.) 72 OT
  - NJCAA
    - Division I Sullivan College, Louisville, KY 103, Allegany CC, Cumberland, MD 98 O/T
    - Division II Penn Valley CC, Mo. 93, Kishwukee CC, Ill. 88
    - Division III Sullivan County CC 74, Gloucester County College 63
- Women
  - NCAA
    - Division I: University of Tennessee 83, University of Georgia 65
    - Division II: North Dakota State 104, Shippensburg 78
    - Division III: Wis.-Oshkosh 66 Mount Union 50
  - NAIA
    - Division I: Southern Nazarene (Okla.) 80, Southeastern Oklahoma State University 79
    - Division II Western Oregon 80, Huron (S.D.) 77
  - NJCAA
    - Division I Trinity Valley CC 69, Independence CC 55
    - Division II Lansing CC 74, Kankakee CC 68
    - Division III Central Lakes College-Brainerd 71, Monroe CC 57

== Awards and honors ==
=== Professional ===
- Men
  - NBA Most Valuable Player Award: Michael Jordan
  - NBA Rookie of the Year Award: Damon Stoudamire, Toronto Raptors
  - NBA Defensive Player of the Year Award: Gary Payton, Seattle SuperSonics
  - NBA Coach of the Year Award: Phil Jackson, Chicago Bulls

=== Collegiate ===
- Men
  - John R. Wooden Award: Marcus Camby, Massachusetts
  - Naismith College Coach of the Year: John Calipari, Massachusetts
  - Frances Pomeroy Naismith Award: Eddie Benton, Vermont
  - Associated Press College Basketball Player of the Year: Marcus Camby, UMass
  - NCAA basketball tournament Most Outstanding Player: Miles Simon, Arizona
  - Associated Press College Basketball Coach of the Year: Gene Keady, Purdue
  - Naismith Outstanding Contribution to Basketball: Boris Stankovic
- Women
  - Naismith College Player of the Year: Saudia Roundtree, Georgia
  - Naismith College Coach of the Year: Andy Landers, Georgia
  - Wade Trophy: Jennifer Rizzotti, Connecticut
  - Frances Pomeroy Naismith Award: Jennifer Rizzotti, Connecticut
  - Associated Press Women's College Basketball Player of the Year: Jennifer Rizzotti, Connecticut
  - NCAA basketball tournament Most Outstanding Player: Michelle M. Marciniak, Tennessee
  - Basketball Academic All-America Team: Jennifer Rizzotti, UConn
  - Basketball Academic All-America Team: Katie Smith, Ohio State
  - Basketball Academic All-America Team: Tricia Wakely, Drake
  - Carol Eckman Award: Joann Rutherford, Missouri
  - Associated Press College Basketball Coach of the Year: Angie Lee, Iowa

=== Naismith Memorial Basketball Hall of Fame ===
- Class of 1996:
  - Krešimir Ćosić
  - George Gervin
  - Gail Goodrich
  - Nancy Lieberman
  - David Thompson
  - George Yardley

== Events ==
- The WNBA formed.

== Movies ==
- Celtic Pride
- Space Jam
- Sunset Park (film)

== Deaths ==
- January 13 — Dean Kelley, American national college champion at Kansas (1952), Olympic gold medalist (1952) (born 1931)
- May 18 — Chet Forte, All-American college player (Columbia) (born 1935)
- June 14 — Jack Ragland, American Olympic gold medalist (1936) (born 1913)
- July 16 — Harold E. Foster, Hall of Fame player and Wisconsin Badgers men's basketball head coach (born 1906)
- July 29 — Lauren "Laddie" Gale, Hall of Fame player for the Oregon Ducks men's basketball and early professional (born 1917)
- August 10 — Derek Smith, American NBA player (born 1961)
- September 25 — Red Mihalik, Hall of Fame NBA, NCAA and Olympic referee (born 1916)

== See also ==
- Timeline of women's basketball
