= 1996 National Invitation Tournament =

Annual NCAA basketball competition

- Season: 1995–96
- Teams: 32
- Finals site: Madison Square Garden, New York City
- Champions: Nebraska Cornhuskers (1st title)
- Runner-up: Saint Joseph's Hawks (1st title game)
- Semifinalists: Tulane Green Wave (1st semifinal); Alabama Crimson Tide (4th semifinal)
- Winning coach: Danny Nee (1st title)
- MVP: Erick Strickland (Nebraska)

The 1996 National Invitation Tournament was the 1996 edition of the annual NCAA college basketball competition.

== Selected teams ==
Below is a list of the 32 teams selected for the tournament.

- Alabama
- Arkansas–Little Rock
- Auburn
- College of Charleston
- Colorado State
- Davidson
- Fairfield
- Fresno State
- Gonzaga
- Illinois
- Illinois State
- Iona
- Manhattan
- Marist
- Miami (OH)
- Michigan State
- Minnesota
- Missouri
- Mount St. Mary's
- Murray State
- Nebraska
- Providence
- Rhode Island
- Saint Joseph's
- Saint Louis
- South Carolina
- Tennessee
- Tulane
- Vanderbilt
- Washington
- Washington State
- Wisconsin

== Bracket ==
Below are the four first round brackets, along with the four-team championship bracket.

First Round
Wisconsin	55
Manhattan	42
Illinois State	73
Mount St. Mary's	49
Minnesota	68
Saint Louis	52
Tulane	87
Auburn	73

Second Round
Wisconsin	62
Illinois State	77
Minnesota	65
Tulane	84

Quarterfinals
Illinois State	72
Tulane	83

First Round
Michigan State	64
Washington	50
Fresno State	58
Miami (OH)	57
Nebraska	91
Colorado State	83
Washington State	92
Gonzaga	73

Second Round
Michigan State	70
Fresno State	80
Nebraska	82
Washington State	73

Quarterfinals
Fresno State	71
Nebraska	83

First Round
Alabama	72
Illinois	69
Missouri	89
Murray State	85
South Carolina	100
Davidson	73
Vanderbilt	86
Arkansas–Little Rock	80

Second Round
Alabama	72
Missouri	49
South Carolina	80
Vanderbilt	70

Quarterfinals
Alabama	68
South Carolina	67

First Round
Saint Joseph's	82
Iona	78
Providence	91
Fairfield	79
Rhode Island	82
Marist	77
College of Charleston	55
Tennessee	49

Second Round
Saint Joseph's	82
Providence	62
Rhode Island	62
College of Charleston	58 OT

Quarterfinals
Saint Joseph's	76
Rhode Island	59

=== Semifinals & finals ===
Semifinals
Tulane	78
Nebraska	90
Alabama	69
Saint Joseph's	74

Finals
Nebraska	60
Saint Joseph's	56

Third place game
Tulane	87
Alabama	76

== See also ==
- 1996 NCAA Division I men's basketball tournament
- 1996 NCAA Division II men's basketball tournament
- 1996 NCAA Division III men's basketball tournament
- 1996 NCAA Division I women's basketball tournament
- 1996 NAIA Division I men's basketball tournament
- 1996 NAIA Division II men's basketball tournament
