= 1995–96 Iowa Hawkeyes women's basketball team =

Intercollegiate basketball season

1995–96 Iowa Hawkeyes women's basketball

Big Ten regular season champions

NCAA tournament, Sweet Sixteen
- Conference: Big Ten Conference

Ranking
- Coaches: No. 9
- AP: No. 7
- Record: 27–4 (15–1 Big Ten)
- Head coach: Angie Lee (1st season)
- Home arena: Carver–Hawkeye Arena

1995–96 Big Ten women's basketball standings
	Conf.				Overall
Team	W		L	PCT	W		L	PCT
No. 7 Iowa	15	–	1	.938	27	–	4	.871
No. 8 Penn State †	13	–	3	.813	27	–	7	.794
No. 18 Wisconsin	12	–	4	.750	21	–	8	.724
No. 15 Purdue	11	–	5	.688	20	–	11	.645
Michigan State	9	–	7	.563	18	–	11	.621
Northwestern	8	–	8	.500	23	–	11	.676
Ohio State	8	–	8	.500	21	–	13	.618
Illinois	6	–	10	.375	13	–	15	.464
Indiana	5	–	11	.313	14	–	13	.519
Michigan	1	–	15	.063	7	–	20	.259
Minnesota	0	–	16	.000	4	–	23	.148
† 1996 Big Ten Tournament winner Rankings from AP Poll

The 1995–96 Iowa Hawkeyes women's basketball team represented the University of Iowa as members of the Big Ten Conference during the 1995–96 NCAA women's basketball season. The Hawkeyes, led by first-year head coach Angie Lee, played their home games in Iowa City, Iowa at Carver–Hawkeye Arena. They finished the season 27–4 overall, 15–1 in Big Ten play, to finish atop the conference regular season standings by two games. The team advanced to the Sweet Sixteen of the women's NCAA basketball tournament.

== Roster ==
1995–96 Iowa Hawkeyes women's basketball team
Players
Coaches

Pos.	#	Name	Height	Year	Previous school	Hometown
G	13	Nadine Domond	5 ft 7 in (1.7 m)	So	Central	Bridgeport, CT
G	24	Angela Hamblin	5 ft 10 in (1.78 m)	So	Lew Wallace	Gary, IN
F	42	Tiffany Gooden	5 ft 11 in (1.8 m)	So	R. Nelson Snider	Fort Wayne, IN
F/C	50	Tangela Smith	6 ft 3 in (1.91 m)	So	George Washington	Chicago, IL

Head coach

- Angie Lee

Assistant coach(es)

Legend

- (C) Team captain
- (S) Suspended
- (I) Ineligible
- (W) Walk-on
- Injured
- Current redshirt

Roster

== Schedule and results ==
Date time, TV	Rank^{#}	Opponent^{#}	Result	Record	Site city, state
Regular season
Dec 20, 1995*	No. 11	vs. No. 10 Georgia; Carolinas Beach Classic	L 52–79	7–2	Myrtle Beach, SC
Big Ten tournament
NCAA tournament
Mar 14, 1996*	(2 ME) No. 7	(15 ME) Butler; First round	W 72–67	26–3	Carver-Hawkeye Arena; Iowa City, Iowa
Mar 16, 1996*	(2 ME) No. 7	(7 ME) DePaul; Second round	W 72–71	27–3	Carver-Hawkeye Arena; Iowa City, Iowa
Mar 21, 1996*	(2 ME) No. 7	vs. (3 ME) No. 12 Vanderbilt; Regional Semifinal – Sweet Sixteen	L 63–74	27–4	Rosemont Horizon; Rosemont, Illinois
*Non-conference game. ^{#}Rankings from AP Poll. (#) Tournament seedings in parentheses. ME=Mideast.

== Rankings ==
Ranking movements Legend: ██ Increase in ranking ██ Decrease in ranking — = Not ranked
	Week																		
Poll	Pre	1	2	3	4	5	6	7	8	9	10	11	12	13	14	15	16	17	Final
AP	19	19	16	13	11	11	12	11	10	9	8	6	5	7	7	6	8	7	Not released
Coaches	25	—	25	15	14	11	12	13	11	8	8	7	5	7	7	6	7	6	9
