= 1996–97 Iowa Hawkeyes women's basketball team =

Intercollegiate basketball season

1996–97 Iowa Hawkeyes women's basketball

Big Ten Tournament champions

NCAA tournament, Second round
- Conference: Big Ten Conference
- Record: 18–12 (9–7 Big Ten)
- Head coach: Angie Lee (2nd season)
- Home arena: Carver–Hawkeye Arena

1996–97 Big Ten women's basketball standings
	Conf.				Overall
Team	W		L	PCT	W		L	PCT
No. 16 Illinois	12	–	4	.750	24	–	8	.750
No. 24 Michigan State	12	–	4	.750	22	–	8	.733
Purdue	12	–	4	.750	17	–	11	.607
Northwestern	9	–	7	.563	17	–	11	.607
Iowa †	9	–	7	.563	18	–	12	.600
Wisconsin	8	–	8	.500	16	–	11	.593
Penn State	8	–	8	.500	15	–	12	.556
Indiana	7	–	9	.438	16	–	13	.552
Michigan	7	–	10	.412	15	–	11	.577
Ohio State	3	–	13	.188	12	–	16	.429
Minnesota	1	–	15	.063	4	–	24	.143
† 1997 Big Ten Tournament winner Rankings from AP Poll

The 1996–97 Iowa Hawkeyes women's basketball team represented the University of Iowa as members of the Big Ten Conference during the 1996–97 NCAA women's basketball season. The Hawkeyes, led by second-year head coach Angie Lee, played their home games in Iowa City, Iowa at Carver–Hawkeye Arena. They finished the season 18–12 overall, 9–7 in Big Ten play, to finish tied for fourth in the conference regular season standings. The team won the Big Ten tournament for the first time in program history and advanced to the women's NCAA basketball tournament.

== Roster ==
1996–97 Iowa Hawkeyes women's basketball team
Players
Coaches

Pos.	#	Name	Height	Year	Previous school	Hometown
G	13	Nadine Domond	5 ft 7 in (1.7 m)	Jr	Central	Bridgeport, CT
G	24	Angela Hamblin	5 ft 10 in (1.78 m)	Jr	Lew Wallace	Gary, IN
F	42	Tiffany Gooden	5 ft 11 in (1.8 m)	Jr	R. Nelson Snider	Fort Wayne, IN
F/C	50	Tangela Smith	6 ft 3 in (1.91 m)	Jr	George Washington	Chicago, IL

Head coach

- Angie Lee

Assistant coach(es)

Legend

- (C) Team captain
- (S) Suspended
- (I) Ineligible
- (W) Walk-on
- Injured
- Current redshirt

Roster

== Schedule and results ==
Date time, TV	Rank^{#}	Opponent^{#}	Result	Record	Site city, state
Regular season
Nov 17, 1996*	No. 6	vs. No. 20 Notre Dame	L 50–61	1–1	
Big Ten tournament
Feb 28, 1997*	(4)	vs. (5) Northwestern; Quarterfinals	W 78–68	15–11	RCA Dome; Indianapolis, Indiana
Mar 1, 1997*	(4)	vs. (8) Indiana; Semifinals	W 87–53	16–11	RCA Dome; Indianapolis, Indiana
Mar 2, 1997*	(4)	vs. (2) No. 18 Illinois; Championship game	W 63–56	17–11	RCA Dome; Indianapolis, Indiana
NCAA tournament
Mar 14, 1997*	(9 MW)	vs. (8 MW) NC State; First round	W 56–50	18–11	Gampel Pavilion; Storrs, Connecticut
Mar 16, 1997*	(9 MW)	at (1 MW) No. 1 Connecticut; Second round	L 53–72	18–12	Gampel Pavilion; Storrs, Connecticut
*Non-conference game. ^{#}Rankings from AP Poll. (#) Tournament seedings in parentheses. MW=Midwest.
