= 1997–98 Iowa Hawkeyes women's basketball team =

Intercollegiate basketball season

1997–98 Iowa Hawkeyes women's basketball

Big Ten regular season champions

NCAA tournament, Second round
- Conference: Big Ten Conference

Ranking
- AP: No. 23
- Record: 18–11 (13–3 Big Ten)
- Head coach: Angie Lee (3rd season)
- Home arena: Carver–Hawkeye Arena

1997–98 Big Ten women's basketball standings
	Conf.				Overall
Team	W		L	PCT	W		L	PCT
No. 23 Iowa	13	–	3	.813	18	–	11	.621
No. 16 Illinois	12	–	4	.750	20	–	10	.667
No. 22 Purdue †	10	–	6	.625	23	–	10	.697
Michigan	10	–	6	.625	19	–	10	.655
Indiana	10	–	6	.625	21	–	12	.636
Wisconsin	9	–	7	.563	21	–	10	.677
Penn State	8	–	8	.500	21	–	13	.618
Ohio State	7	–	9	.438	15	–	12	.556
Michigan State	5	–	11	.313	11	–	16	.407
Northwestern	3	–	13	.188	10	–	21	.323
Minnesota	1	–	15	.063	4	–	23	.148
† 1998 Big Ten Tournament winner Rankings from AP Poll

The 1997–98 Iowa Hawkeyes women's basketball team represented the University of Iowa as members of the Big Ten Conference during the 1997–98 NCAA women's basketball season. The Hawkeyes, led by third-year head coach Angie Lee, played their home games in Iowa City, Iowa at Carver–Hawkeye Arena. They finished the season 18–11 overall, 13–3 in Big Ten play, to capture the conference regular season title. The team advanced to the second round of the women's NCAA basketball tournament.

== Roster ==
1997–98 Iowa Hawkeyes women's basketball team
Players
Coaches

Pos.	#	Name	Height	Year	Previous school	Hometown
G	13	Nadine Domond	5 ft 7 in (1.7 m)	Sr	Central	Bridgeport, CT
G	21	Cara Consuegra	5 ft 8 in (1.73 m)	Fr	Linganore	Frederick, MD
G	24	Angela Hamblin	5 ft 10 in (1.78 m)	Sr	Lew Wallace	Gary, IN
F	42	Tiffany Gooden	5 ft 11 in (1.8 m)	Sr	R. Nelson Snider	Fort Wayne, IN
F/C	50	Tangela Smith	6 ft 3 in (1.91 m)	Sr	George Washington	Chicago, IL

Head coach

- Angie Lee

Assistant coach(es)

Legend

- (C) Team captain
- (S) Suspended
- (I) Ineligible
- (W) Walk-on
- Injured
- Current redshirt

Roster

== Schedule and results ==
Date time, TV	Rank^{#}	Opponent^{#}	Result	Record	Site city, state
Regular season
Dec 6, 1997*		vs. No. 4 Louisiana Tech; Central Fidelity Invite	L 58–83	4–1	Richmond Coliseum; Richmond, Virginia
Big Ten tournament
NCAA tournament
Mar 14, 1998*	(4 W) No. 23	(13 W) UMass; First round	W 77–59	18–10	Carver-Hawkeye Arena; Iowa City, Iowa
Mar 16, 1998*	(4 W) No. 23	(5 W) Kansas; Second round	L 58–62	18–11	Carver-Hawkeye Arena; Iowa City, Iowa
*Non-conference game. ^{#}Rankings from AP Poll. (#) Tournament seedings in parentheses. ME=Mideast.
