= 1995–96 Connecticut Huskies women's basketball team =

Intercollegiate basketball season

1995–96 Connecticut Huskies women's basketball

Big East tournament champions Big East regular season champions

NCAA tournament, Final Four
- Conference: Big East Conference

Ranking
- Coaches: No. 3
- AP: No. 3
- Record: 34–4 (17–1 Big East)
- Head coach: Geno Auriemma (11th season)
- Associate head coach: Chris Dailey
- Assistant coaches: Tonya Cardoza; Charlene Curtis
- Home arena: Harry A. Gampel Pavilion

1995–96 Big East Conference women's basketball standings
	Conf.				Overall
Team	W		L	PCT	W		L	PCT
No. 2 Connecticut †	17	–	1	.944	34	–	4	.895
No. 21 Notre Dame	15	–	3	.833	23	–	8	.742
Villanova	13	–	5	.722	21	–	7	.750
Seton Hall	9	–	9	.500	16	–	13	.552
Miami (FL)	9	–	9	.500	14	–	13	.519
Syracuse	9	–	9	.500	14	–	14	.500
Providence	9	–	9	.500	12	–	15	.444
Rutgers	8	–	10	.444	13	–	15	.464
Boston College	7	–	11	.389	13	–	14	.481
Georgetown	7	–	11	.389	12	–	15	.444
West Virginia	7	–	11	.389	12	–	15	.444
St. John's	4	–	14	.222	6	–	21	.222
Pittsburgh	3	–	15	.167	6	–	24	.200
† 1996 Big East Tournament winner Rankings from AP poll

The 1995–96 Connecticut Huskies women's basketball team represented the University of Connecticut (UConn) during the 1995–96 NCAA Division I women's basketball season. The Huskies, led by Hall of Fame head coach Geno Auriemma in his 11th season at UConn, played their home games at Harry A. Gampel Pavilion and were members of the Big East Conference.

UConn finished their regular season with a record of 27–3, including 17–1 in the Big East to win the conference regular season championship. They also won the Big East tournament. Then, in the NCAA Tournament, they defeated Howard, Michigan State, San Francisco, and Vanderbilt to make a return trip to the Final Four. In the National semifinals, UConn was beaten by Tennessee as the Lady Vols avenged their loss in the National championship from the prior season.

== Roster ==
1995–96 UConn Huskies women's basketball team
Players
Coaches

Pos.	#	Name	Height	Year	Hometown
G	5	Kim Better	5 ft 7 in (1.7 m)	Sr	Suitland, Maryland
G	10	Missy Rose	5 ft 10 in (1.78 m)	Jr	Scranton, Pennsylvania
G	21	Jennifer Rizzotti	5 ft 5 in (1.65 m)	Sr	New Fairfield, Connecticut
G	23	Rita Williams	5 ft 6 in (1.68 m)	So	Norwalk, Connecticut
F	25	Brenda Marquis	6 ft 3 in (1.91 m)	So	Moosup, Connecticut
F	31	Carla Berube	6 ft 0 in (1.83 m)	Jr	Oxford, Massachusetts
F	33	Jamelle Elliott	6 ft 0 in (1.83 m)	Sr	Washington, D.C.
F	34	Kelley Hunt	6 ft 2 in (1.88 m)	So	Londonderry, New Hampshire
F	42	Nykesha Sales	6 ft 0 in (1.83 m)	So	Bloomfield, Connecticut
F	44	Sarah Northway (redshirt)	6 ft 1 in (1.85 m)	Sr	Brainerd, Minnesota
C	52	Kara Wolters	6 ft 7 in (2.01 m)	Jr	Holliston, Massachusetts

Head coach

- Geno Auriemma

Assistant coach(es)

Legend

- (C) Team captain
- (S) Suspended
- (I) Ineligible
- (W) Walk-on
- Injured
- Current redshirt

== Schedule ==
Date time, TV	Rank^{#}	Opponent^{#}	Result	Record	Site city, state
Exhibition
November 5, 1995*	No. 1	USA National team	L 47–83		Gampel Pavilion (8,241); Storrs, CT
November 15, 1995*	No. 1	Australia Southern District	W 106–67		Gampel Pavilion (7,427); Storrs, CT
Regular season
Nov 19, 1995*; 1:00 p.m., ESPN	No. 1	vs. No. 4 Louisiana Tech; Hall of Fame Tipoff Classic	L 81–83 ^{OT}	0–1	Thompson–Boling Arena; Knoxville, TN
Nov 24, 1995*; 2:00 p.m.	No. 3	vs. Northern Arizona; Wahine Classic	W 87–63	1–1	Special Events Arena; Honolulu, HI
Nov 25, 1995*	No. 3	vs. Oregon State; Wahine Classic	W 88–70	2–1	Special Events Arena (1,282); Honolulu, HI
Nov 26, 1995*	No. 3	at Hawaii; Wahine Classic	W 65–48	3–1	Special Events Arena; Honolulu, HI
Dec 2, 1995*	No. 2	vs. No. 24 North Carolina; Central Fidelity Invitational Tournament	W 77-62	4–1	Richmond Coliseum; Richmond, VA
Dec 3, 1995*	No. 2	vs. No. 23 Alabama; Central Fidelity Invitational Tournament	W 81-67	5–1	Richmond Coliseum (5,536); Richmond, VA
Dec 7, 1995	No. 3	West Virginia	W 79-47	6–1	Gampel Pavilion (8,241); Storrs, CT
Dec 9, 1995*	No. 3	Loyola; Connecticut Classic	W 74-22	7–1	Gampel Pavilion (4,944); Storrs, CT
Dec 10, 1995*; 2:00 p.m.	No. 3	Duquesne; Connecticut Classic	W 88-60	8–1	Gampel Pavilion (7,943); Storrs, CT
Dec 22, 1995*	No. 2	Rhode Island	W 84-65	9–1	Gampel Pavilion (8,241); Storrs, CT
Dec 29, 1995*	No. 2	Northeastern	W 96-34	10–1	Gampel Pavilion (8,241); Storrs, CT
Jan 2, 1996; 7:30 p.m., CPTV	No. 2	at Syracuse	L 59-62	10–2	Manley Field House (1,124)
Jan 4, 1996; 7:30 p.m., CPTV	No. 2	at Georgetown	W 96-64	11–2	Gampel Pavilion (8,241); Storrs, CT
Jan 6, 1996*; 3:00 p.m., CBS	No. 2	at No. 4 Tennessee; Rivalry	W 59–53	12–2	Thompson–Boling Arena (10,584); Knoxville, TN
Jan 10, 1996; 7:00 p.m. CPTV	No. 3	at Miami	W 79–52	13–2	Knight Sports Center (1,136); Coral Gables, FL
Jan 12, 1996; 7:30 p.m., CPTV	No. 3	Providence	W 108–71	14–2	Gampel Pavilion (8,241); Storrs, CT
Jan 15, 1996*; 4:00 p.m. ESPN	No. 3	No. 4 Georgia	L 67–75	14–3	Gampel Pavilion (8,241); Storrs, CT
Jan 18, 1996; 7:00 p.m., CPTV	No. 3	Notre Dame	W 87–64	15–3	Joyce Center (6,501); South Bend, IN
Jan 20, 1996; 2:00 p.m., CPTV	No. 3	at Providence	W 76–46	16–3	Alumni Hall (3,182); Providence, RI
Jan 24, 1996; 7:30 p.m., CPTV	No. 3	Rutgers	W 96–68	17–3	Gampel Pavilion (8,241); Storrs, CT
Jan 27, 1996; 1:00 p.m., CPTV	No. 4	Pittsburgh	W 91–52	18–3	Gampel Pavilion (8,241); Storrs, CT
Jan 30, 1996; 7:30 p.m.	No. 3	at Villanova	W 62–46	19–3	Finneran Pavilion (2,721); Villanova, PA
Feb 3, 1996; 1:00 p.m., CPTV	No. 4	at Boston College	W 87–65	20–3	Conte Forum (3,463); Chestnut Hill, MA
Feb 7, 1996; 7:30 p.m., CPTV	No. 3	St. John's	W 85–41	21–3	Gampel Pavilion (8,241); Storrs, CT
Feb 10, 1996; 2:00 p.m., CPTV	No. 3	Seton Hall	W 73–40	22–3	Gampel Pavilion (8,241); Storrs, CT
Feb 13, 1996; 7:00 p.m.	No. 3	at West Virginia	W 82–37	23–3	Hope Coliseum (1,312); Morgantown, WV
Feb 18, 1996; 2:00 p.m., CPTV	No. 3	at Rutgers	W 73–61	24–3	Louis Brown Athletic Center (7,793); Piscataway, NJ
Feb 21, 1996; 7:30 p.m.	No. 3	at St. John's	W 82–54	25–3	Alumni Hall (2,015); Queens
Feb 24, 1996; 3:00 p.m., ESPN2	No. 3	Notre Dame	W 86–79	26–3	Gampel Pavilion (8,241); Storrs, CT
Feb 26, 1996; 7:30 p.m., CPTV	No. 3	Villanova	W 85–51	27–3	Gampel Pavilion (8,241); Storrs, CT
Big East tournament
March 3, 1996; 12:00 Noon	(1) No. 3	(8) Rutgers; Quarterfinals	W 93–64	28–3	Gampel Pavilion (8,241); Storrs, CT
March 4, 1996; 6:00 p.m.	(1) No. 2	(13) Pittsburgh; Semifinals	W 83–51	29–3	Gampel Pavilion (8,241); Storrs, CT
March 5, 1996*; 5:00 p.m.	(1) No. 2	(2) No. 22 Notre Dame; Championship game	W 71–54	30–3	Gampel Pavilion (8,241); Storrs, CT
NCAA tournament
March 16, 1996*; 8:30 p.m., CPTV	(1 ME) No. 2	(16 ME) Howard; First round	W 94–63	31–3	Gampel Pavilion (8,241); Storrs, CT
March 18, 1996*; 9:30 p.m.	(1 ME) No. 2	(9 ME) Michigan State; Second round	W 88–68	32–3	Gampel Pavilion (8,241); Storrs, CT
March 25, 1996*; 9:30 p.m. CST	(1 ME) No. 2	vs. (12 ME) San Francisco; Regional Semifinal – Sweet Sixteen	W 72–44	33–3	Rosemont Horizon (7,190); Rosemont, IL
March 25, 1996*; 8:30 p.m. CST	(1 ME) No. 2	vs. (3 ME) Vanderbilt; Regional Final – Elite Eight	W 67–57	34–3	Rosemont Horizon (6,333); Rosemont, IL
March 29, 1996*	(1 ME) No. 2	vs. (1 E) No. 4 Tennessee; National Semifinal – Final Four/Rivalry	L 83–88 ^{OT}	34–4	Charlotte Coliseum; Charlotte, NC
*Non-conference game. ^{#}Rankings from AP Poll. (#) Tournament seedings in parentheses. All times are in EST.

== Rankings ==
Ranking movements Legend: ██ Increase in ranking ██ Decrease in ranking
	Week																		
Poll	Pre	1	2	3	4	5	6	7	8	9	10	11	12	13	14	15	16	17	Final
AP	1	3	2	3	3	2	2	2	3	3	3	4	3	3	3	3	2	2	Not released
Coaches	1	3	3	3	3	2	2	2	3	3	6	5	4	4	4	4	3	3	3
