= 1995–96 Tennessee Lady Volunteers basketball team =

Intercollegiate basketball season

1995–96 Tennessee Lady Volunteers basketball

NCAA tournament National champions SEC tournament champions
- Conference: Southeastern Conference

Ranking
- Coaches: No. 1
- AP: No. 4
- Record: 32–4 (9–2 SEC)
- Head coach: Pat Summitt (22nd season)
- Assistant coaches: Mickie DeMoss; Holly Warlick
- Home arena: Thompson-Boling Arena

1995–96 SEC women's basketball standings
	Conf.				Overall
Team	W		L	PCT	W		L	PCT
No. 5 Georgia	10	–	1	.909	28	–	5	.848
No. 4 Tennessee^{†}	9	–	2	.818	32	–	4	.889
No. 12 Vanderbilt	7	–	4	.636	23	–	8	.742
No. 10 Alabama	7	–	4	.636	24	–	8	.750
No. 19 Auburn	6	–	5	.545	23	–	9	.719
No. 16 Florida	6	–	5	.545	21	–	9	.700
No. 24 Ole Miss	6	–	5	.545	18	–	11	.621
LSU	4	–	7	.364	21	–	11	.656
Mississippi State	4	–	7	.364	13	–	14	.481
Arkansas	3	–	8	.273	21	–	13	.618
South Carolina	2	–	9	.182	16	–	12	.571
Kentucky	2	–	9	.182	8	–	19	.296
† 1996 SEC tournament winner Rankings from AP poll

The 1995–96 Tennessee Lady Volunteers basketball team represented the University of Tennessee as a member of the Southeastern Conference during the 1995–96 women's college basketball season. Coached by Pat Summitt, the Lady Volunteers opened the season ranked No. 6 in the AP poll, and played their home games at Thompson–Boling Arena in Knoxville, Tennessee. These Lady Vols finished 32–4 (9–2 SEC) while playing one of the toughest schedules in the nation, and closed out the season on a 15-game win streak. After falling in the National championship game the prior season, the 1995–96 squad started a run of three national championships back-to-back-to-back.

== Roster ==
1995–96 Tennessee Lady Volunteers women's basketball team
Players
Coaches

Pos.	#	Name	Height	Year	Previous school	Hometown
G	3	Michelle Marciniak	5 ft 10 in (1.78 m)	Sr	Americus	Allentown, Pennsylvania
C	4	Tiffani Johnson	6 ft 4 in (1.93 m)	Jr		Charlotte, North Carolina
G	14	Kellie Jolly	5 ft 10 in (1.78 m)	Fr	White County	Sparta, Tennessee
F/C	23	Chamique Holdsclaw	6 ft 2 in (1.88 m)	Fr	Christ the King	Astoria, New York

Head coach

- Pat Summitt

Assistant coach(es)

- Mickie DeMoss
- Holly Warlick

Legend

- (C) Team captain
- (S) Suspended
- (I) Ineligible
- (W) Walk-on
- Injured
- Current redshirt

Roster

== Schedule and results ==
Date time, TV	Rank^{#}	Opponent^{#}	Result	Record	Site city, state
Regular season
Dec 16, 1995*	No. 2	at No. 9 Stanford	L 72–90	7–1	Maples Pavilion; Palo Alto, CA
Jan 2, 1996	No. 4	No. 21 Florida	W 87–67	10–1 (1–0)	Thompson–Boling Arena; Knoxville, TN
Jan 6, 1996*	No. 4	No. 2 Connecticut	L 53–59	10–2	Thompson–Boling Arena; Knoxville, TN
Jan 8, 1996	No. 4	at No. 7 Georgia	L 71–77	10–3 (1–1)	Stegeman Coliseum; Athens, GA
Jan 11, 1996*	No. 4	No. 15 Old Dominion	W 69–47	11–3	Thompson–Boling Arena; Knoxville, TN
Feb 22, 1996	No. 5	at LSU	W 88–75	22–4 (8–2)	Thompson–Boling Arena; Knoxville, TN
Feb 25, 1996	No. 5	at No. 10 Vanderbilt	W 79–71	23–4 (9–2)	Memorial Gymnasium; Nashville, TN
SEC tournament
March 2, 1996*	(2) No. 4	vs. (7) No. 23 Ole Miss; Quarterfinals	W 73–51	24–4	McKenzie Arena; Chattanooga, TN
March 3, 1996*	(2) No. 4	vs. (6) No. 18 Florida; Semifinals	W 74–63	25–4	McKenzie Arena; Chattanooga, TN
March 4, 1996*	(2) No. 4	vs. (4) No. 10 Alabama; Championship game	W 64–60	26–4	McKenzie Arena; Chattanooga, TN
NCAA tournament
March 16, 1996*	(1 E) No. 4	(16 E) Radford; First round	W 97–56	27–4	Thompson–Boling Arena; Knoxville, TN
March 18, 1996*	(1 E) No. 4	(9 E) Ohio State; Second round	W 97–65	28–4	Thompson–Boling Arena; Knoxville, TN
March 23, 1996*	(1 E) No. 4	vs. (4 E) No. 20 Kansas; Regional Semifinal – Sweet Sixteen	W 92–71	29–4	University Hall; Charlottesville, VA
March 25, 1996*	(1 E) No. 4	at (3 E) No. 11 Virginia; Regional Final – Elite Eight	W 52–46	30–4	University Hall; Charlottesville, VA
March 29, 1996*	(1 E) No. 4	vs. (1 ME) No. 2 Connecticut; National Semifinal – Final Four/Rivalry	W 88–83 ^{OT}	31–4	Charlotte Coliseum; Charlotte, NC
March 31, 1996*	(1 E) No. 4	vs. (2 MW) No. 5 Georgia; Championship	W 83–65	32–4	Charlotte Coliseum; Charlotte, NC
*Non-conference game. ^{#}Rankings from AP Poll. (#) Tournament seedings in parentheses. MW=Midwest.

== Rankings ==
Ranking movements Legend: ██ Increase in ranking ██ Decrease in ranking
	Week																		
Poll	Pre	1	2	3	4	5	6	7	8	9	10	11	12	13	14	15	16	17	Final
AP	6	4	3	2	2	4	5	4	4	6	4	3	6	5	5	5	4	4	Not released
Coaches	6	2	2	2	2	4	4	4	5	5	5	3	6	5	5	5	4	4	1
