= 1995–96 NCAA Division I women's basketball rankings =

Basketball ranking polls

- Season: 1995–96
- NCAA Tournament: 1996
- Preseason No. 1: Connecticut
- NCAA Tournament Champions: Tennessee
NCAA Division I women's basketball rankings


Two human polls comprise the 1995–96 NCAA Division I women's basketball rankings, the AP Poll and the Coaches Poll, in addition to various publications' preseason polls. The AP poll is currently a poll of sportswriters, while the USA Today Coaches' Poll is a poll of college coaches. The AP conducts polls weekly through the end of the regular season and conference play, while the Coaches poll conducts a final, post-NCAA tournament poll as well.

== Legend ==
–	No votes
(#)	Ranking

== AP Poll ==
Team	14-Nov	21-Nov	27-Nov	4-Dec	11-Dec	18-Dec	25-Dec	1-Jan	8-Jan	15-Jan	22-Jan	29-Jan	5-Feb	12-Feb	19-Feb	28-Feb	4-Mar	11-Mar
Louisiana Tech	4	1	1	1	1	1	1	1	1	1	1	2	2	2	1	1	1	1
UConn	1	3	2	3	3	2	2	2	3	3	3	4	3	3	3	3	2	2
Stanford	7	8	11	9	9	5	4	7	6	5	6	5	4	4	4	4	3	3
Tennessee	6	4	3	2	2	4	5	4	4	6	4	3	6	5	5	5	4	4
Georgia	2	2	6	12	12	10	9	9	7	4	2	1	1	1	2	2	5	5
Old Dominion	–	–	21	23	20	19	19	16	15	T15	11	11	10	8	8	7	6	6
Iowa	19	19	16	13	11	11	12	11	10	9	8	6	5	7	7	6	8	7
Penn St.	8	7	12	6	6	7	7	6	5	10	10	13	12	9	11	11	9	8
Texas Tech	11	12	10	11	10	15	15	10	9	8	9	8	7	6	6	9	7	9
Alabama	24	25	23	20	18	18	18	19	19	18	17	15	13	12	14	13	10	10
Virginia	3	6	5	5	5	6	6	5	8	7	7	9	9	10	9	8	11	11
Vanderbilt	5	5	4	4	4	3	3	3	2	2	5	7	11	13	10	10	12	12
Duke	17	22	19	17	16	16	16	15	16	13	12	12	14	14	12	12	13	13
Clemson	–	–	–	–	–	–	–	–	23	24	18	17	18	19	16	22	15	14
Purdue	9	10	7	10	13	12	11	17	18	21	21	22	23	22	21	17	14	15
Florida	–	–	–	–	–	23	23	21	25	22	20	21	20	17	19	18	16	16
Colorado	14	11	8	8	8	9	10	13	12	T15	16	16	19	18	20	20	19	17
Wisconsin	22	21	20	18	17	17	17	18	17	14	13	10	8	11	13	15	17	18
Auburn	–	–	–	–	–	–	25	25	24	23	25	25	22	20	17	16	18	19
Kansas	13	14	13	16	21	–	–	–	–	–	–	–	–	–	24	21	20	20
Notre Dame	–	–	–	–	–	–	–	–	–	–	–	–	24	25	23	T23	22	21
Oregon St.	20	18	17	15	15	14	13	12	11	12	15	18	16	15	15	14	21	22
North Carolina St.	12	13	15	14	14	13	14	14	13	11	14	14	15	16	18	19	23	23
Ole Miss	21	20	25	21	19	20	22	24	22	25	23	20	17	21	22	T23	T24	24
Texas A&M	–	23	22	19	24	24	21	22	–	–	–	–	–	–	–	–	–	25
Arkansas	10	9	9	7	7	8	8	8	14	20	22	24	–	–	–	–	–	–
DePaul	15	15	18	22	25	–	–	–	–	–	–	–	–	–	–	–	–	–
North Carolina	23	24	24	25	22	22	–	–	–	–	–	–	–	–	–	–	–	–
Northwestern	–	–	–	–	–	25	24	23	21	17	19	23	–	–	–	–	–	–
Oklahoma St.	–	–	–	–	23	21	20	20	20	19	24	19	21	24	–	–	–	–
Southern California	16	16	–	–	–	–	–	–	–	–	–	–	–	–	–	–	–	–
Southern Miss.	–	–	–	–	–	–	–	–	–	–	–	–	–	–	25	–	–	–
Stephen F. Austin	–	–	–	–	–	–	–	–	–	–	–	–	25	23	–	–	–	–
Texas	–	–	–	–	–	–	–	–	–	–	–	–	–	–	–	25	T24	–
Washington	25	–	–	–	–	–	–	–	–	–	–	–	–	–	–	–	–	–
Western Ky.	18	17	14	24	–	–	–	–	–	–	–	–	–	–	–	–	–	–

== USA Today Coaches poll ==
Team	PS	21-Nov	28-Nov	5-Dec	12-Dec	19-Dec	26-Dec	2-Jan	9-Jan	16-Jan	23-Jan	30-Jan	6-Feb	13-Feb	20-Feb	27-Feb	5-Mar	12-Mar	2-Apr
Tennessee	6	2	2	2	2	4	4	4	5	5	5	3	6	5	5	5	4	4	1
Georgia	3	4	6	11	12	10	10	9	8	6	2	1	1	1	2	2	5	5	2
UConn	1	3	3	3	3	2	2	2	3	3	6	5	4	4	4	4	3	3	3
Stanford	7	6	10	9	9	5	5	8	6	4	3	4	3	3	3	3	2	2	4
Louisiana Tech	5	1	1	1	1	1	1	1	1	1	1	2	2	2	1	1	1	1	5
Virginia	2	7	7	5	6	7	7	5	7	7	7	9	8	10	10	9	11	10	6
Vanderbilt	4	5	4	4	4	3	3	3	2	2	4	6	9	11	9	10	12	12	7
Auburn	–	–	–	25	21	21	21	23	20	21	23	21	21	18	16	16	18	18	8
Iowa	25	–	25	15	14	11	12	13	11	8	8	7	5	7	7	6	7	6	9
Old Dominion	–	–	23	23	22	23	20	17	15	15	12	10	10	8	8	7	6	7	10
Alabama	20	21	19	T19	19	20	19	20	22	19	17	16	14	12	13	14	10	11	11
Texas Tech	15	14	11	12	10	14	14	12	12	10	9	8	7	6	6	8	8	9	12
Penn St.	8	8	12	8	7	8	8	6	4	9	10	13	12	9	11	11	9	8	13
Stephen F. Austin	–	–	–	–	–	–	–	–	–	–	–	–	–	24	25	21	21	21	14
Kansas	12	12	13	T19	24	–	–	–	–	–	–	–	–	–	–	25	22	22	15
San Francisco	–	–	–	–	–	–	–	–	–	–	–	–	–	–	–	–	–	–	16
Clemson	–	–	–	–	–	–	–	–	23	24	19	18	18	20	17	20	14	14	17
Colorado	11	11	8	6	5	6	6	10	9	11	11	14	16	16	18	19	19	17	18
Duke	16	19	20	17	18	18	16	14	16	16	13	11	13	13	12	12	13	13	19
Wisconsin	–	–	–	–	–	24	22	21	21	18	15	12	11	14	14	15	20	19	20
Notre Dame	–	–	–	–	–	–	–	–	–	–	–	–	–	–	24	24	23	23	21
Florida	23	24	21	18	17	15	T17	18	24	23	20	20	19	17	19	17	16	15	22
DePaul	13	13	16	–	–	–	–	–	–	–	–	–	–	–	–	–	–	–	23
Colorado St.	–	–	–	–	–	–	–	–	–	–	–	–	–	–	–	–	–	–	24
Texas	–	–	–	–	–	–	–	–	–	–	–	–	–	–	–	–	–	–	25
Arkansas	10	9	9	7	8	9	9	7	14	20	21	24	25	25	–	–	–	–	–
Montana	–	–	–	–	–	25	–	–	–	–	–	–	–	–	–	–	–	–	–
North Carolina	19	18	17	14	15	16	24	–	–	25	25	–	–	–	–	–	–	–	–
North Carolina St.	17	16	18	16	16	17	15	15	13	14	16	17	17	19	20	23	25	25	–
Northwestern	–	–	–	–	23	22	23	22	18	12	18	22	24	–	–	–	–	–	–
Ohio St.	–	–	–	–	–	–	–	25	–	–	–	–	–	–	–	–	–	–	–
Oklahoma St.	–	–	24	22	20	19	T17	16	17	17	22	19	22	22	–	–	–	–	–
Ole Miss	22	23	–	–	–	–	–	–	25	–	–	25	20	23	22	22	21	21	–
Oregon St.	18	17	15	13	13	12	11	11	10	13	14	15	15	15	15	13	17	20	–
Purdue	9	10	5	10	11	13	13	19	19	22	24	23	23	21	21	18	15	16	–
Southern California	21	20	–	–	–	–	–	–	–	–	–	–	–	–	–	–	–	–	–
Southern Miss.	–	–	–	–	–	–	–	–	–	–	–	–	–	–	23	–	–	–	–
Texas A&M	–	22	22	21	25	–	25	24	–	–	–	–	–	–	–	–	–	–	–
Washington	24	25	–	–	–	–	–	–	–	–	–	–	–	–	–	–	–	–	–
Western Ky.	14	15	14	24	–	–	–	–	–	–	–	–	–	–	–	–	–	–	–
