= John Schick =

American basketball player (1916–1990)

Personal information
- Born: January 6, 1916 Bridgeport, Connecticut, U.S.
- Died: January 8, 1990 (aged 74) Toledo, Ohio, U.S.
- Listed height: 6 ft 6 in (1.98 m)
- Listed weight: 230 lb (104 kg)

Career information
- High school: Central (Bridgeport, Connecticut)
- College: Ohio State (1936–1939)
- Position: Center / power forward

Career history
- 1941–1942: Dayton Delco
- 1942–1943: Dayton Dive Bombers
- 1943–1944: Dayton Acme Aviators
- 1944–1945: Dayton Acmes
- 1945–1946: Dayton Mickeys
- 1946–1948: Toledo Jeeps
- 1949–1950: Toledo Mercuries

John Michael Schick (January 6, 1916 – January 8, 1990) was an American professional basketball player. He played for the Toledo Jeeps in the National Basketball League between 1946 and 1948, averaging 3.7 points per game. He also played for a number of Amateur Athletic Union and independent league teams.

Schick appeared in the first-ever NCAA tournament championship game in 1939, scoring one field goal in a losing effort against Oregon.

Schick was married to Virginia Willman of Coldwater Ohio. They had three children: John Michael Schick III, Thomas Allen Schick, and Daniel Lee Schick
