= 1995–96 Stanford Cardinal women's basketball team =

Intercollegiate basketball season

1995–96 Stanford Cardinal women's basketball

Pac-10 champions

NCAA tournament, Final Four
- Conference: Pacific-10 Conference

Ranking
- Coaches: No. 4
- AP: No. 3
- Record: 29–3 (18–0 Pac-10)
- Head coach: Amy Tucker; Marianne Stanley
- Assistant coach: Reneé Brown
- Home arena: Maples Pavilion

1995–96 Pacific-10 Conference women's basketball standings
| | Conf. | | | | Overall |
| Team | W | | L | PCT | W | | L | PCT |
|---|---|---|---|---|---|---|---|---|
| No. 3 Stanford | 18 | – | 0 | 1.000 | 29 | – | 3 | .906 |
| No. 22 Oregon State | 11 | – | 7 | .611 | 19 | – | 9 | .679 |
| Arizona | 10 | – | 8 | .556 | 22 | – | 8 | .733 |
| Oregon | 10 | – | 8 | .556 | 18 | – | 11 | .621 |
| Washington | 10 | – | 8 | .556 | 16 | – | 13 | .552 |
| Washington State | 8 | – | 10 | .444 | 17 | – | 12 | .586 |
| USC | 8 | – | 10 | .444 | 13 | – | 14 | .481 |
| UCLA | 8 | – | 10 | .444 | 13 | – | 14 | .481 |
| Arizona State | 4 | – | 14 | .222 | 6 | – | 21 | .222 |
| California | 3 | – | 15 | .167 | 7 | – | 20 | .259 |
Rankings from AP Poll

The 1995–96 Stanford Cardinal women's basketball team represented Stanford University during the 1995–96 NCAA Division I women's basketball season. While Tara VanDerveer focused on coaching the US National Team, the Cardinal were coached by Amy Tucker and Marianne Stanley. The Cardinal were members of the Pacific-10 Conference. They won the Pac-10 Championship (18–0) by seven games and reached the Final Four for the fifth time in seven seasons.

== Roster ==
1995–96 Stanford Cardinal women's basketball team
Players
Coaches

| Pos. | # | Name | Height | Year | Hometown |
|---|---|---|---|---|---|
| F | 0 | Olympia Scott | 6 ft 2 in (1.88 m) | So | Los Angeles, California |
| G | 4 | Amy Wustefeld | 5 ft 9 in (1.75 m) | Sr | Sacramento, California |
| G | 10 | Jamila Wideman | 5 ft 6 in (1.68 m) | Jr | Amherst, Massachusetts |
| F | 13 | Vanessa Nygaard | 6 ft 0 in (1.83 m) | RS So | Carlsbad, California |
| G | 15 | Regan Freuen | 6 ft 0 in (1.83 m) | So | Spokane, Washington |
| G | 21 | Charmin Smith | 5 ft 10 in (1.78 m) | Jr | St. Louis, Missouri |
| G/F | 23 | Bobbie Kelsey | 5 ft 11 in (1.8 m) | Sr | Decatur, Georgia |
| F | 24 | Kristin Folkl | 6 ft 2 in (1.88 m) | So | St. Louis, Missouri |
| F | 30 | Kate Starbird | 6 ft 2 in (1.88 m) | Jr | Tacoma, Washington |
| C | 32 | Chandra Benton | 6 ft 7 in (2.01 m) | RS Fr | Lake Oswego, Oregon |
| F | 33 | Tara Harrington | 6 ft 0 in (1.83 m) | Jr | Klamath Falls, Oregon |
| C | 34 | Naomi Mulitauaopele | 6 ft 3 in (1.91 m) | So | Seattle, Washington |
| F/C | 44 | Heather Owen | 6 ft 2 in (1.88 m) | So | Moscow, Idaho |

Head coach

- Tara VanDerveer

Assistant coach(es)

Legend

- (C) Team captain
- (S) Suspended
- (I) Ineligible
- (W) Walk-on
- Injured
- Current redshirt

Roster

== Schedule ==
| Date time, TV | Rank^{#} | Opponent^{#} | Result | Record | Site (attendance) city, state |
Regular season
| Nov 23, 1995* | No. 7 | at UMass | L 56–65 | 0–1 | Mullins Center; Amherst, MA |
| Nov 25, 1995* | No. 7 | at Providence | W 81–58 | 1–1 | Providence Civic Center; Providence, RI |
| Nov 30, 1995* | No. 11 | No. 21 Old Dominion | W 97–76 | 2–1 | Maples Pavilion; Palo Alto, CA |
| Dec 9, 1995* | No. 9 | Santa Clara | W 91–51 | 3–1 | Maples Pavilion; Palo Alto, CA |
| Dec 16, 1995* | No. 9 | No. 2 Tennessee | W 90–72 | 4–1 | Maples Pavilion; Palo Alto, CA |
| Dec 18, 1995* | No. 5 | Sacramento State; Fry's Cardinal Classic | W 105–47 | 5–1 | Maples Pavilion; Palo Alto, CA |
| Dec 19, 1995* | No. 5 | Auburn; Fry's Cardinal Classic | W 63–44 | 6–1 | Maples Pavilion; Palo Alto, CA |
| Dec 27, 1995* | No. 4 | at No. 15 Texas Tech | L 65–71 | 6–2 | City Bank Coliseum; Lubbock, TX |
| Dec 29, 1995* | No. 4 | at Texas | W 72–68 | 7–2 | Frank Erwin Center; Austin, TX |
| Jan 3, 1996 | No. 7 | at Arizona State | W 88–71 | 8–2 (1–0) | ASU Activity Center; Tempe, AZ |
| Jan 5, 1996 | No. 7 | at Arizona | W 77–55 | 9–2 (2–0) | McKale Center; Tucson, AZ |
| Mar 6, 1996 | No. 3 | Arizona | W 77–61 | 24–2 (17–0) | Maples Pavilion; Palo Alto, CA |
| Mar 8, 1996 | No. 3 | Arizona State | W 79–63 | 25–2 (18–0) | Maples Pavilion; Palo Alto, CA |
NCAA women's tournament
| March 16, 1996* | (1 W) No. 3 | (16 W) Grambling State; First round | W 82–43 | 26–2 | Maples Pavilion; Palo Alto, CA |
| March 18, 1996* | (1 W) No. 3 | (8 W) Colorado State; Second round | W 94–63 | 27–2 | Maples Pavilion; Palo Alto, CA |
| March 23, 1996* | (1 W) No. 3 | at (4 W) No. 10 Alabama; Regional Semifinal – Sweet Sixteen | W 78–76 | 28–2 | Hec Edmundson Pavilion; Seattle, WA |
| March 25, 1996* | (1 W) No. 3 | at (6 W) No. 19 Auburn; Regional Final – Elite Eight | W 71–57 | 29–2 | Hec Edmundson Pavilion; Seattle, WA |
| Mar 29, 1996* | (1 W) No. 3 | vs. (2 MW) No. 5 Georgia; National Semifinal – Final Four | L 76–86 | 29–3 | Charlotte Coliseum; Charlotte, NC |
*Non-conference game. ^{#}Rankings from AP Poll. (#) Tournament seedings in parentheses. W=Stanford, CA regional. All times are in Pacific Time.

== Rankings ==
Ranking movements Legend: ██ Increase in ranking ██ Decrease in ranking
| | Week | | | | | | | | | | | | | | | | | | |
| Poll | Pre | 1 | 2 | 3 | 4 | 5 | 6 | 7 | 8 | 9 | 10 | 11 | 12 | 13 | 14 | 15 | 16 | 17 | Final |
|---|---|---|---|---|---|---|---|---|---|---|---|---|---|---|---|---|---|---|---|
| AP | 7 | 8 | 11 | 9 | 9 | 5 | 4 | 7 | 6 | 5 | 6 | 5 | 4 | 4 | 4 | 4 | 3 | 3 | Not released |
| Coaches | 7 | 6 | 10 | 9 | 9 | 5 | 5 | 8 | 6 | 4 | 3 | 4 | 3 | 3 | 3 | 3 | 2 | 2 | 4 |
