= 1995–96 Georgia Lady Bulldogs basketball team =

Intercollegiate basketball season

1995–96 Georgia Lady Bulldogs basketball

SEC Regular season champions

NCAA tournament, Runner-up
- Conference: Southeastern Conference

Ranking
- Coaches: No. 2
- AP: No. 5
- Record: 28–5 (10–1 SEC)
- Head coach: Andy Landers (17th season)
- Home arena: Stegeman Coliseum

1995–96 SEC women's basketball standings
	Conf.				Overall
Team	W		L	PCT	W		L	PCT
No. 5 Georgia	10	–	1	.909	28	–	5	.848
No. 4 Tennessee^{†}	9	–	2	.818	32	–	4	.889
No. 12 Vanderbilt	7	–	4	.636	23	–	8	.742
No. 10 Alabama	7	–	4	.636	24	–	8	.750
No. 19 Auburn	6	–	5	.545	23	–	9	.719
No. 16 Florida	6	–	5	.545	21	–	9	.700
No. 24 Ole Miss	6	–	5	.545	18	–	11	.621
LSU	4	–	7	.364	21	–	11	.656
Mississippi State	4	–	7	.364	13	–	14	.481
Arkansas	3	–	8	.273	21	–	13	.618
South Carolina	2	–	9	.182	16	–	12	.571
Kentucky	2	–	9	.182	8	–	19	.296
† 1996 SEC tournament winner Rankings from AP poll

The 1995–96 Georgia Lady Bulldogs women's basketball team represented University of Georgia in the 1995–96 college basketball season. The Lady Bulldogs, led by 17th-year head coach Andy Landers, played their home games at Stegeman Coliseum and were members of the Southeastern Conference. They finished the season 28–5, 10–1 in SEC play to finish as regular season conference champions. Georgia was the No. 2 seed in the Midwest region of the NCAA tournament. They defeated St. Francis (PA), Oklahoma State, Stephen F. Austin, and Louisiana Tech to reach their second straight NCAA Final Four. In the National semifinal game, Georgia defeated Stanford. In the National championship game, the Lady Bulldogs were taken down by SEC rival Tennessee.

== Roster ==
1995–96 Georgia Bulldogs women's basketball team
Players
Coaches

Pos.	#	Name	Height	Year	Previous school	Hometown
F	00	La'Keshia Frett	6 ft 3 in (1.91 m)	Jr	Phoebus	Hampton, Virginia
G	10	Saudia Roundtree	5 ft 8 in (1.73 m)	Sr		Anderson, South Carolina
G	25	Kedra Holland-Corn	5 ft 8 in (1.73 m)	Jr	Houston, Texas
C	33	Tracy Henderson	6 ft 3 in (1.91 m)	Jr

Head coach

Andy Landers

Assistant coach(es)

Legend

- (C) Team captain
- (S) Suspended
- (I) Ineligible
- (W) Walk-on
- Injured
- Current redshirt

== Schedule ==
Date time, TV	Rank^{#}	Opponent^{#}	Result	Record	Site (attendance) city, state
Regular season
Dec 20, 1995*	No. 10	vs. No. 11 Iowa; Carolinas Beach Classic	W 79–52	7–2	Myrtle Beach, SC
Dec 21, 1995*	No. 10	vs. Nebraska; Carolinas Beach Classic	W 86–70	8–2	Myrtle Beach, SC
Jan 8, 1996	No. 7	No. 4 Tennessee	W 77–71	11–2 (2–0)	Stegeman Coliseum; Athens, GA
Feb 24, 1996	No. 2	at Arkansas	W 87–54	23–3 (10–1)	Bud Walton Arena; Fayetteville, AR
SEC tournament
Mar 1, 1996*	(1) No. 2	vs. (8) LSU; Quarterfinals	L 71–73	23–4	McKenzie Arena; Chattanooga, TN
NCAA tournament
Mar 15, 1996*	(2 MW) No. 5	(15 MW) Saint Francis (PA); First round	W 98–66	24–4	Stegeman Coliseum; Athens, GA
Mar 17, 1996*	(2 MW) No. 5	(7 MW) Oklahoma State; Second round	W 83–55	25–4	Stegeman Coliseum; Athens, GA
Mar 23, 1996*	(2 MW) No. 5	at (11 MW) Stephen F. Austin; Regional Semifinal – Sweet Sixteen	W 78–64	26–4	William R. Johnson Coliseum; Nacogdoches, TX
Mar 25, 1996*	(2 MW) No. 5	vs. (1 MW) No. 1 Louisiana Tech; Regional Final – Elite Eight	W 90–76	27–4	William R. Johnson Coliseum; Nacogdoches, TX
Mar 29, 1996*	(2 MW) No. 5	vs. (1 W) No. 3 Stanford; National Semifinal – Final Four	W 86–76	28–4	Charlotte Coliseum; Charlotte, NC
March 31, 1996*	(2 MW) No. 5	vs. (1 E) No. 4 Tennessee; National Championship	L 65–83	28–5	Charlotte Coliseum; Charlotte, NC
*Non-conference game. ^{#}Rankings from AP Poll. (#) Tournament seedings in parentheses. MW=Midwest. All times are in Eastern Time.

== Rankings ==
Ranking movements Legend: ██ Increase in ranking ██ Decrease in ranking
	Week																		
Poll	Pre	1	2	3	4	5	6	7	8	9	10	11	12	13	14	15	16	17	Final
AP	2	2	6	12	12	10	9	9	7	4	2	1	1	1	2	2	5	5	Not released
Coaches	3	4	6	11	12	10	10	9	8	6	2	1	1	1	2	2	5	5	2
