= 1995–96 Clemson Tigers women's basketball team =

Women's college basketball season

1995–96 Clemson Tigers women's basketball

ACC Tournament Champions

NCAA Tournament, Second Round
- Conference: Atlantic Coast Conference
- Record: 23–8 (9–7 ACC)
- Head coach: Jim Davis (9th season)
- Home arena: Littlejohn Coliseum

The 1995–96 Clemson Tigers women's basketball team represented Clemson University during the 1995–96 NCAA Division I women's basketball season. The Tigers were led by ninth year head coach Jim Davis. The Tigers, members of the Atlantic Coast Conference, played their home games at Littlejohn Coliseum.

== Schedule ==
Date time, TV	Rank^{#}	Opponent^{#}	Result	Record	Site city, state
November 28, 1995*		at UNC–Charlotte	W 77–74 ^{OT}	1–0	Belk Gymnasium; Charlotte, North Carolina
November 30, 1995*		UT Arlington	W 78–54	2–0	Littlejohn Coliseum; Clemson, South Carolina
December 2, 1995*		College of Charleston	W 88–53	3–0	Littlejohn Coliseum; Clemson, South Carolina
December 4, 1995*		at Western Carolina	W 80–28	4–0	Ramsey Center; Cullowhee, North Carolina
December 6, 1995*		at Furman	W 77–30	5–0	Greenville Memorial Auditorium; Greenville, South Carolina
December 9, 1995*		Appalachian State	W 89–73	6–0	Littlejohn Coliseum; Clemson, South Carolina
December 16, 1995*		UNC–Charlotte	W 69–59	7–0	Littlejohn Coliseum; Clemson, South Carolina
December 18, 1995*		vs. Jackson State; UT Arlington Tournament	W 82–46	8–0	Texas Hall; Arlington, Texas
December 19, 1995*		at UT Arlington; UT Arlington Tournament	W 85–72	9–0	Texas Hall; Arlington, Texas
January 2, 1996		at No. 5 Virginia	W 63–59	10–0 (1–0)	University Hall; Charlottesville, Virginia
January 7, 1996		at Florida State	W 87–74	11–0 (2–0)	Tallahassee–Leon County Civic Center; Tallahassee, Florida
January 13, 1996	No. 23	at North Carolina	L 68–93	11–1 (2–1)	Carmichael Arena; Chapel Hill, North Carolina
January 17, 1996	No. 24	Wake Forest	W 85–68	12–1 (3–1)	Littlejohn Coliseum; Clemson, South Carolina
January 20, 1996	No. 24	No. 11 NC State	W 76–64	13–1 (4–1)	Littlejohn Coliseum; Clemson, South Carolina
January 25, 1996	No. 18	at Georgia Tech	L 38–55	13–2 (4–2)	Alexander Memorial Coliseum; Atlanta, Georgia
January 28, 1996	No. 18	No. 7 Virginia	W 57–45	14–2 (5–2)	Littlejohn Coliseum; Clemson, South Carolina
January 31, 1996	No. 17	at No. 12 Duke	L 63–74	14–3 (5–3)	Cameron Indoor Stadium; Durham, North Carolina
February 3, 1996	No. 17	Florida State	W 70–53	15–3 (6–3)	Littlejohn Coliseum; Clemson, South Carolina
February 5, 1996*	No. 17	South Carolina rivalry	W 75–57	16–3 (6–3)	Littlejohn Coliseum; Clemson, South Carolina
February 7, 1996	No. 18	Maryland	W 70–53	17–3 (7–3)	Littlejohn Coliseum; Clemson, South Carolina
February 10, 1996	No. 18	at Maryland	L 72–74	17–4 (7–4)	Cole Field House; College Park, Maryland
February 15, 1996	No. 19	North Carolina	W 79–78 ^{OT}	18–4 (8–4)	Littlejohn Coliseum; Clemson, South Carolina
February 17, 1996	No. 19	at Wake Forest	W 59–58	19–4 (9–4)	LJVM Coliseum; Winston-Salem, North Carolina
February 19, 1996	No. 16	No. 12 Duke	L 65–75	19–5 (9–5)	Littlejohn Coliseum; Clemson, South Carolina
February 21, 1996	No. 16	at No. 18 NC State	L 72–77	19–6 (9–6)	Reynolds Coliseum; Raleigh, North Carolina
February 25, 1996	No. 16	Georgia Tech	L 62–72	19–7 (9–7)	Littlejohn Coliseum; Clemson, South Carolina
ACC Tournament
March 1, 1996*	No. 22	vs. North Carolina; ACC Tournament quarterfinal	W 67–49	20–7 (9–7)	Winthrop Coliseum; Rock Hill, South Carolina
March 2, 1996*	No. 22	vs. No. 8 Virginia; ACC Tournament semifinal	W 75–67	21–7 (9–7)	Winthrop Coliseum; Rock Hill, South Carolina
March 3, 1996*	No. 22	vs. No. 12 Duke; ACC Tournament final	W 71–54	22–7 (9–7)	Winthrop Coliseum; Rock Hill, South Carolina
NCAA Tournament
March 16, 1996*	No. 14	Austin Peay; NCAA Tournament first round	W 79–52	23–7 (9–7)	Littlejohn Coliseum; Clemson, South Carolina
March 18, 1996*	No. 14	Stephen F. Austin; NCAA Tournament second round	L 88–93 ^{OT}	23–8 (9–7)	Littlejohn Coliseum; Clemson, South Carolina
*Non-conference game. ^{#}Rankings from AP Poll. (#) Tournament seedings in parentheses.
