= John F. Kennedy Stadium (Bridgeport) =

Stadium in Bridgeport, Connecticut, United States

John F. Kennedy
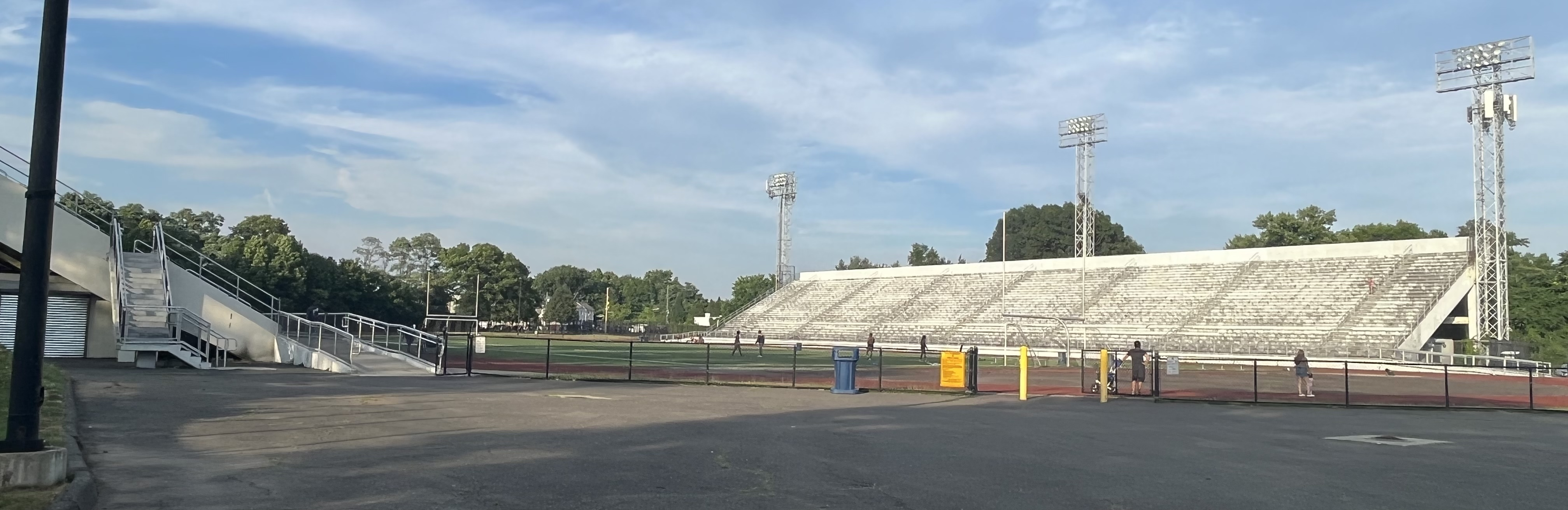
- Interactive map of John F. Kennedy
- Full name: John F. Kennedy Stadium
- Location: Bridgeport, Connecticut United States
- Coordinates: 41.188357°N 73.203526°W
- Operator: Bridgeport School District
- Capacity: 12,000

Construction
- Opened: 1964

Tenants
- Bridgeport Jets (ACFL) (1966–1974); University of Bridgeport (NCAA) (1964–1975); Central High School (CIAC) (1964–present)

John F. Kennedy Stadium is a 12,000-seat lighted stadium located at Central High School in Bridgeport, Connecticut. The stadium is designed for use for football, soccer, lacrosse games and track and field meets.

The stadium was built along with the current high school, which was completed in 1964, and named for President John F. Kennedy. In addition to being home to the Central High School Hilltoppers, it was home to the University of Bridgeport's football program until it was disbanded in 1975.

The final game of the minor league Atlantic Coast Football League was held at the stadium, when the New England Colonials defeated the Bridgeport Jets by 41–17 in the ACFL championship game. A total of 10,176 fans attended the contest on November 23, 1973—ten years and a day after President Kennedy died, in a stadium named after him.

In recent years, the stadium served as the site of the Eastern Marching Band Association and Musical Arts Conference marching band field show finals in early November. In 2001, the stadium was the host to the first Major League Lacrosse championship weekend.

== Soccer ==
Date	Visitor	Score	Home	Match Type	Attendance
July 13, 2024	Olancho FC (Honduras)	2-2	(Guatemala) Comunicaciones F.C.	Club Friendly	

== Lacrosse ==
Date	Winner	Score	Runner-up	Attendance
September 1, 2001	Long Island Lizards	13-12	Rochester Rattlers	-
September 1, 2001	Baltimore Bayhawks	12-11	Boston Cannons	-
September 3, 2001	Long Island Lizards	15–11	Baltimore Bayhawks	6,745

== See also ==
- List of memorials to John F. Kennedy

Events and tenants
Preceded by First	Host of Major League Lacrosse championship weekend 2001	Succeeded by Columbus Crew Stadium
