= Trevardo Williams =

American football player (born 1990)

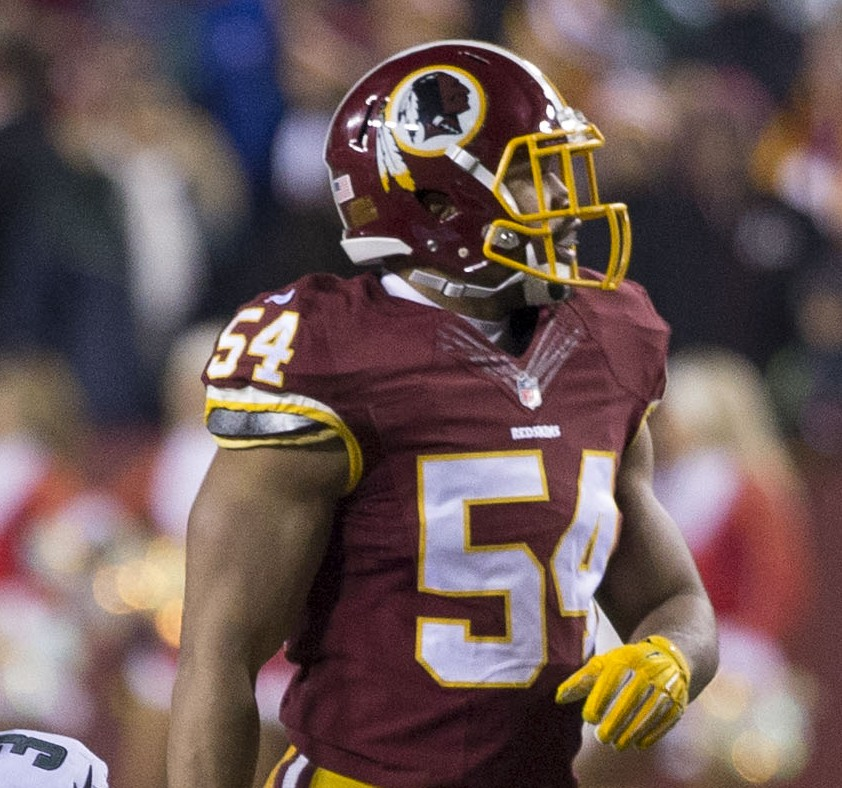
- Williams with the Redskins in 2014

No. 54
- Position: Defensive end

Personal information
- Born: December 31, 1990 (age 35); Jamaica
- Listed height: 6 ft 1 in (1.85 m)
- Listed weight: 241 lb (109 kg)

Career information
- High school: Bridgeport (CT) Central
- College: Connecticut
- NFL draft: 2013: 4th round, 124th overall pick

Career history
- Houston Texans (2013); Arizona Cardinals (2014)*; Indianapolis Colts (2014)*; Washington Redskins (2014); Toronto Argonauts (2016)*
- * Offseason or practice squad member only

Awards and highlights
- First-team All-Big East (2012); Second-team All-Big East (2011)

Career NFL statistics
- Total tackles: 5
- Sacks: 1.0
- Stats at Pro Football Reference

Trevardo V. Williams (born December 31, 1990) is a Jamaican-born former American football defensive end. He played college football at Connecticut, and was selected by the Houston Texans in the fourth round of the 2013 NFL draft. Williams was also a member of the Arizona Cardinals, Indianapolis Colts, Washington Redskins, Toronto Argonauts.

== Early life ==
Williams was born in Jamaica, and moved to the United States as a child in 1999. He attended Central High School in Bridgeport, Connecticut, where he played high school football for the Central Hilltoppers. The Hartford Courant and New Haven Register named him to their all-state football teams in 2007. Upon graduation, Williams attended boarding school Canterbury School in New Milford, Connecticut and competed for the Saints.

Williams was also a standout athlete for the Central High School track team. He finished 3rd in the 100 meters at the 2007 State Open championships with a time of 10.74 seconds. He finished 2nd in the 200 meters at the 2008 State Class LL Championships, with a time of 22.41 seconds. He was timed at a career-best time of 10.69 seconds in the 100 meters in his senior year. He also ran a personal best time of 21.98 in the 200 meters.

== College career ==
Williams attended the University of Connecticut, where he played for the Connecticut Huskies football team from 2009 to 2012. During his college career, he started 30 of 50 games in which he appeared, recording 133 tackles and 30.5 quarterback sacks. The 30.5 sacks are a team record. Following his senior season in 2012, he was a unanimous first-team All-Big East Conference selection.

== Professional career ==
Pre-draft measurables
Height	Weight	Arm length	Hand span	40-yard dash	10-yard split	20-yard split	20-yard shuttle	Three-cone drill	Vertical jump	Broad jump	Bench press
6 ft 1 in (1.85 m)	241 lb (109 kg)	32 1/4	9 3/8	4.57 s	1.58 s	2.54 s	4.35 s	7.24 s	38 in (0.97 m)	10 ft 4 in (3.15 m)	30 reps
All values from NFL Combine.

=== Houston Texans ===
The Houston Texans selected Williams in the fourth round, with the 124th overall pick, of the 2013 NFL draft. He was released by the Texans on August 1, 2014

=== Arizona Cardinals ===
Williams was claimed off waivers by the Arizona Cardinals on August 2, 2014, but was released on August 8.

=== Indianapolis Colts ===
Williams signed with the Indianapolis Colts' practice squad on September 23, 2014. He was released on November 25.

=== Washington Redskins ===
Williams signed with the Washington Redskins practice squad on December 2, 2014. He was promoted to the active roster on December 9. He was waived/injured on August 14, 2015. After going unclaimed, the Redskins placed him on injured reserve. The Redskins released Williams from injured reserve with a settlement on August 19.

=== Toronto Argonauts ===
Williams signed with the Toronto Argonauts on February 8, 2016. He was released on June 19, 2016.
