= Angela Hamblin =

American basketball player (born 1976)

Personal information
- Born: September 30, 1976 (age 50) Gary, Indiana, U.S.
- Listed height: 5 ft 10 in (1.78 m)
- Listed weight: 170 lb (77 kg)

Career information
- High school: Lew Wallace (Gary, Indiana)
- College: Iowa (1995–1998)
- WNBA draft: 1998: 3rd round, 23rd overall pick
- Drafted by: Washington Mystics
- Position: Guard
- Number: 24

Career history
- 1998: Detroit Shock

Career highlights
- 2× Second-team All-Big Ten (2002, 2004); Big Ten Tournament MOP (1997)
- Stats at Basketball Reference

Angela Hamblin (born September 30, 1976) is a former professional basketball player for the Detroit Shock of the WNBA.

== Career statistics ==
Legend
GP	Games played	GS	Games started	MPG	Minutes per game	RPG	Rebounds per game
APG	Assists per game	SPG	Steals per game	BPG	Blocks per game	PPG	Points per game
TO	Turnovers per game	FG%	Field-goal percentage	3P%	3-point field-goal percentage	FT%	Free-throw percentage
**Bold**	Career best	°	League leader

=== WNBA ===
==== Regular season ====
Year	Team	GP	GS	MPG	FG%	3P%	FT%	RPG	APG	SPG	BPG	TO	PPG
1998	Detroit	6	0	4.8	25.0	50.0	50.0	1.2	0.3	0.2	0.0	1.2	1.0
Career	1 year, 1 team	6	0	4.8	25.0	50.0	50.0	1.2	0.3	0.2	0.0	1.2	1.0

=== College ===
Year	Team	GP	GS	MPG	FG%	3P%	FT%	RPG	APG	SPG	BPG	TO	PPG
1995–96	Iowa	**27**	-	-	43.4	**31.6**	56.6	4.6	1.1	**2.9**	0.3	-	7.6
1996–97	Iowa	24	-	-	**50.6**	9.1	71.4	**6.8**	1.4	1.5	**0.8**	-	**13.3**
1997–98	Iowa	20	-	-	48.2	27.3	**74.0**	5.8	**1.6**	1.2	0.3	-	12.8
**Career**		71	-	-	47.8	24.4	67.5	5.7	1.3	1.9	0.5	-	11.0
Statistics retrieved from Sports-Reference.
