= 1996 NCAA Division III women's basketball tournament =

- Teams: 64
- Finals site: , Oshkosh, Wisconsin
- Champions: Wisconsin–Oshkosh Titans (1st title)
- Runner-up: Mount Union Purple Raiders (1st title game)
- Third place: St. Thomas Tommies (3rd Final Four)
- Fourth place: NYU Violets (1st Final Four)
- Winning coach: Kathi Bennett (1st title)

The 1996 NCAA Division III women's basketball tournament was the 15th annual tournament hosted by the NCAA to determine the national champion of Division III women's collegiate basketball in the United States.

Wisconsin–Oshkosh defeated Mount Union in the championship game, 66–50, to claim the Titans' first Division III national title.

The championship rounds were hosted by the University of Wisconsin–Oshkosh in Oshkosh, Wisconsin.

== Bracket ==
- An asterisk by a team indicates the host of first and second round games
- An asterisk by a score indicates an overtime period

=== Atlantic sectional ===
Play-in round February 28, 1996; Campus sites
Southern Maine*	66
Regis (MA)	48
Northeast Region
Worcester Tech	58
Westfield State*	63
Capital*	71
Muskingum	65
Atlantic Region
Wittenberg	51
Mount Union*	64
Middlebury*	67
Emmanuel (MA)	54
Northeast Region
Eastern Connecticut	47
Salem State*	69
Salisbury	77
Goucher*	53
Atlantic Region
Baldwin Wallace	73
Defiance*	84

Second round March 2, 1996; Campus sites
Southern Maine*	73
Westfield State	52
Capital	62
Mount Union*	65
Middlebury	55
Salem State*	58
Salisbury	64
Defiance*	94

Sectional semifinals March 8, 1996; Defiance, OH
Southern Maine	62
Mount Union	79
Salem State	58
Defiance	84

Sectional finals March 9, 1996; Defiance, OH
Mount Union	66
Defiance	61

=== South sectional ===
Play-in round February 28, 1996; Campus sites
Randolph-Macon*	91
Shenandoah	74
South Region
Hendrix	57
Millsaps*	65
Claremont-Mudd-Scripps*	62
La Verne	61
West Region
Concordia Moorhead	60
Bethel (MN)*	64
Maryville (TN)*	77
Roanoke	76
South Region
Trinity (TX)	53
Marymount (VA)*	92
UC San Diego*	58
Pomona-Pitzer	57
West Region
St. Benedict	52
St. Thomas (MN)*	68

Second round March 2, 1996; Campus sites
Randolph-Macon*	99
Millsaps	66
Claremont-Mudd-Scripps	60
Bethel (MN)*	64
Maryville (TN)	53
Marymount (VA)*	92
UC San Diego	42
St. Thomas (MN)*	66

Sectional semifinals March 8, 1996; Ashland, VA
Randolph-Macon	77
Bethel (MN)*	96
Marymount (VA)	62
St. Thomas (MN)	67

Sectional finals March 9, 1996; Ashland, VA
Bethel (MN)	57
St. Thomas (MN)	65

=== East sectional ===
Play-in round February 28, 1996; Campus sites
Rowan*	81
Elizabethtown	68
Mid-Atlantic Region
Messiah	75
Allentown*	65
William Smith*	83
Hartwick	61
East Region
Binghamton	66
Geneseo State*	71
Johns Hopkins*	70
Alvernia	58
Mid-Atlantic Region
Cabrini	74
Scranton*	85
Nazareth*	59
St. John Fisher	60
East Region
CCNY	43
NYU	*

Second round March 2, 1996; Campus sites
Rowan*	90
Messiah	65
William Smith*	85
Geneseo State	68
Johns Hopkins	62
Scranton*	75
St. John Fisher	41
NYU*	82

Sectional semifinals March 8, 1996; New York, NY
Rowan	97
William Smith	69
Scranton	48
NYU	77

Sectional finals March 9, 1996; New York, NY
Rowan	63
NYU	68

=== Central sectional ===
Play-in round February 28, 1996; Campus sites
Millikin*	74
MacMurray	43
Central Region
Luther	91
Buena Vista*	76
Wisconsin–Eau Claire*	70
Wisconsin–Stout	41
Great Lakes Region
Ripon	50
Calvin*	60
Wheaton (IL)*	72
Carthage	71
Central Region
Illinois Wesleyan	63
Washington St. Louis*	68
Alma*	44
Beloit	47
Great Lakes Region
DePauw	45
Wisconsin–Oshkosh*	77

Second round March 2, 1996; Campus sites
Millikin*	74
Luther	59
Wisconsin–Eau Claire*	68
Calvin	47
Wheaton	62
Washington St. Louis*	68
Beloit	50
Wisconsin–Oshkosh*	69

Sectional semifinals March 8, 1996; Decatur, IL
Millikin	71
Wisconsin–Eau Claire	90
Washington St. Louis	53
Wisconsin–Oshkosh	75

Sectional finals March 9, 1996; Decatur, IL
Wisconsin–Eau Claire	57
Wisconsin–Oshkosh	62

=== Final Four ===
Final Four; March 15, 1996; Oshkosh, WI
Mount Union	71
St. Thomas (MN)	57
NYU	37
Wisconsin–Oshkosh	62

National championship March 16, 1996; Oshkosh, WI
Mount Union	50
Wisconsin–Oshkosh	66
Third place
St. Thomas (MN)	75
NYU	51

== All-tournament team ==
- Shelley Dietz, Wisconsin–Oshkosh
- Wendy Wangerin, Wisconsin–Oshkosh
- Suzy Venet, Mount Union
- Tracy Wilson, Mount Union
- Kirsten Vipond, St. Thomas (MN)

== See also ==
- 1996 NCAA Division III men's basketball tournament
- 1996 NCAA Division I women's basketball tournament
- 1996 NCAA Division II women's basketball tournament
- 1996 NAIA Division I women's basketball tournament
- 1996 NAIA Division II women's basketball tournament
