= 1996 SEC women's basketball tournament =

American college basketball postseason tournament

- Classification: Division I
- Teams: 12
- Site: McKenzie Arena; Chattanooga, TN
- Champions: Tennessee (7th title)
- Winning coach: Pat Summitt (7th title)
- MVP: Dominique Canty (Alabama)
- Attendance: 36,391

The 1996 Southeastern Conference women's basketball tournament was the postseason women's basketball tournament for the Southeastern Conference (SEC) held at the McKenzie Arena in Chattanooga, Tennessee, from March 1 – 4, 1996. The Tennessee Lady Volunteers won the tournament and earned an automatic bid to the 1996 NCAA Division I women's basketball tournament.

== Seeds ==
All teams in the conference participated in the tournament. Teams were seeded by their conference record.

Seed	School	Conference record	Overall record	Tiebreaker
1	Georgia^{‡†}	10–1	28–5	
2	Tennessee^{†}	9–2	32–4	
3	Vanderbilt^{†}	7–4	23–8	
4	Alabama^{†}	7–4	24–8	
5	Auburn	6–5	23–9	
6	Florida	6–5	21–9	
7	Ole Miss	6–5	18–11	
8	LSU	4–7	21–11	
9	Mississippi State	4–7	13–14	
10	Arkansas	3–8	21–13	
11	South Carolina	2–9	16–12	
12	Kentucky	2–9	8–19	
‡ – SEC regular season champions, and tournament No. 1 seed. † – Received a bye in the conference tournament. Overall records include all games played in the SEC Tournament.

== Schedule ==
Game	Matchup^{#}	Score
First Round – Fri, Feb 28
1	No. 8 LSU vs. No. 9 Mississippi State	85–63
2	No. 5 Auburn vs. No. 12 Kentucky	58–43
3	No. 7 Ole Miss vs. No. 10 Arkansas	76–73
4	No. 6 Florida vs. No. 11 South Carolina	65–48
Quarterfinal – Sat, Mar 1
5	No. 1 Georgia vs. No. 8 LSU	71–73
6	No. 4 Alabama vs. No. 5 Auburn	65–59
7	No. 2 Tennessee vs. No. 7 Ole Miss	73–51
8	No. 3 Vanderbilt vs. No. 6 Florida	73–83
Semifinal – Sun, Mar 2
9	No. 8 LSU vs. No. 4 Alabama	70–86
10	No. 2 Tennessee vs. No. 6 Florida	74–63
Championship – Mon, Mar 3
11	No. 4 Alabama vs. No. 2 Tennessee	60–64
# – Rankings denote tournament seed

== Bracket ==
First round Fri, Feb 28
8	LSU	85
9	Mississippi State	63
5	Auburn	58
12	Kentucky	43
7	Ole Miss	76
10	Arkansas	73
6	Florida	65
11	South Carolina	48

Quarterfinals; Sat, Mar 1
1	Georgia	71
8	LSU	73
4	Alabama	65
5	Auburn	59
2	Tennessee	73
7	Ole Miss	51
3	Vanderbilt	73
6	Florida	83

Semifinals; Sun, Mar 2
8	LSU	70
4	Alabama	86
2	Tennessee	74
6	Florida	63

Championship; Mon, Mar 3
4	Alabama	60
2	Tennessee	64
