= Angie Lee =

American university administrator

Biographical details
- Born: 1962 or 1963; Paxton, Illinois, U.S.

Coaching career (HC unless noted)
- 1987–1988: Western Illinois (asst.)
- 1988–1995: Iowa (scout)
- 1995–2000: Iowa
- 2000–2004: Virginia Tech (asst.)

Accomplishments and honors

Awards
- AP Coach of the Year (1996)

Angie Lee (born 1962 or 1963) is the director of student affairs at the University of Wisconsin-La Crosse since 2016. Before working at Wisconsin-La Crosse, Lee was an assistant coach with the Western Illinois Leathernecks women's basketball from 1987 to 1988 and a scout for the Iowa Hawkeyes women's basketball team from 1988 to 1995. Lee was promoted to head coach for Iowa in 1995 and was the 1996 Associated Press College Women's Basketball Coach of the Year. Upon her departure from Iowa in 2000, Lee was an assistant coach on the Virginia Tech Hokies women's basketball team from 2000 until she ended her coaching career in 2004.

== Early life and education ==
In the early 1960s, Lee was born in Paxton, Illinois with six siblings and played volleyball alongside basketball in high school. She continued to play basketball as a member of the Iowa Hawkeyes women's basketball team during her post-secondary education. At Iowa, she graduated with a Bachelor of Science in 1984 and a master's degree specializing in sports administration in 1987.

== Career ==
Lee began her sports career as an assistant basketball coach for the Western Illinois Leathernecks women's basketball from 1987 to 1988. After leaving Western Illinois, she continued her assistant coaching tenure as a scout for the Iowa Hawkeyes from 1988 to 1995. When head coach Vivian Stringer left Iowa in 1995, Lee was the Hawkeye's interim head coach in July 1995 before her promotion to head coach in August 1996. While with Iowa, Lee and her team reached the Sweet Sixteen during the 1996 NCAA Division I women's basketball tournament. The following year, her team won the Big Ten women's basketball tournament. While at Iowa, Lee worked for USA Basketball as an assistant coach. With the American women's basketball team, Lee was one of the assistant coaches during the 1998 R. William Jones Cup.

In 2000, Lee stepped down from her coaching position at Iowa. Upon ending her coaching tenure, Lee had 84 wins and 60 losses with Iowa. That year, Lee was selected to work in athletic fundraising at the University of Denver. During June 2000, Lee became an assistant basketball coach for the Virginia Tech Hokies women's basketball team.

When Lee ended her coaching career with Virginia Tech in 2004, she held multiple jobs including truck unloading and pet sitting. That year, Lee returned to academics to work in university admission and student affairs at the University of Wisconsin-La Crosse. In 2016, she became the director of student affairs for Wisconsin-La Crosse.

== Head coaching record ==
Statistics overview
Season	Team	Overall	Conference	Standing	Postseason
Iowa Hawkeyes (Big Ten Conference) (1995–2000)
1995–96	Iowa	27–4	15–1	1st	NCAA Division I Sweet Sixteen
1996–97	Iowa	18–12	9–7	T–4th	NCAA Division I Second Round
1997–98	Iowa	18–11	13–3	1st	NCAA Division I Second Round
1998–99	Iowa	12–15	7–9	8th	
1999–00	Iowa	9–18	6–10	7th	
Iowa:		84–60 (.583)	50–30 (.625)		
Total:		84–60 (.583)			
National champion Postseason invitational champion Conference regular season champion Conference regular season and conference tournament champion Division regular season champion Division regular season and conference tournament champion Conference tournament champion

== Awards and honors ==
In 1996, Lee received the Big Ten Conference Women's Basketball Coach of the Year and the Associated Press College Women's Basketball Coach of the Year while with Iowa.
