= 1996 NAIA Division I women's basketball tournament =

Women's basketball tournament

- Teams: 32
- Finals site: Oman Arena, Jackson, Tennessee
- Champions: Southern Nazarene Redskins (4th title, 4th title game, 5th Fab Four)
- Runner-up: SE Oklahoma State Savages (2nd title game, 2nd Fab Four)
- Semifinalists: Lipscomb Bisons (3rd Fab Four); Union (TN) Bulldogs (2nd Fab Four)
- Coach of the year: Jerry Finkbeiner (Southern Nazarene)
- Charles Stevenson Hustle Award: Becky Cole (Southern Nazarene)
- Chuck Taylor MVP: Crystal Robinson (SE Oklahoma State)
- Top scorer: Joanna Cuprys (Auburn Montgomery) (90 points)

The 1996 NAIA Division I women's basketball tournament was the tournament held by the NAIA to determine the national champion of women's college basketball among its Division I members in the United States and Canada for the 1995–96 basketball season.

In a rematch of the 1995 final, second-seeded, two-time defending champions Southern Nazarene defeated top-seeded Southeastern Oklahoma State in the championship game, 80–79, to claim the Redskins' fourth NAIA national title. This would ultimately go on to be the third of four consecutive championships for Southern Nazarene.

The tournament was played at the Oman Arena in Jackson, Tennessee.

== Qualification ==
The tournament field remained fixed at thirty-two teams, with the top sixteen teams receiving seeds.

The tournament continued to utilize a simple single-elimination format.

== Bracket ==
First round
1	SE Oklahoma State	86
LeTourneau	51
Lewis–Clark State	55
16	Arkansas Tech	72
9	Xavier Louisiana	84
Claflin	50
Daemen	63
8	Central State (OH)	82
5	Lipscomb	86
Lindenwood	60
Oklahoma Baptist	62
12	Montana State Northern	65
13	Western New Mexico	69*
SW Oklahoma State	68
St. Mary's (TX)	60
4	Auburn Montgomery	61*
3	Union (TN)	76
Georgia Southwestern	48
Campbellsville	81
14	Wayland Baptist	80
11	Montevallo	88
Harding	71
NW Oklahoma State	67
6	Western Washington	70*
7	East Central (OK)	74
Purdue Calumet	61
Rockhurst	54
10	Simon Fraser	61
15	Belmont	90
Mary Hardin-Baylor	94***
Biola	51
2	Southern Nazarene	81

Second round
1	SE Oklahoma State	100
16	Arkansas Tech	58
9	Xavier Louisiana	60
8	Central State (OH)	75
5	Lipscomb	87
12	Montana State Northern	67
13	Western New Mexico	75
4	Auburn Montgomery	91
3	Union (TN)	80
Campbellsville	58
11	Montevallo	67
6	Western Washington	71
7	East Central (OK)	57
10	Simon Fraser	60
Mary Hardin-Baylor	55
2	Southern Nazarene	70

Elite Eight
1	SE Oklahoma State	91
8	Central State (OH)	67
5	Lipscomb	75
4	Auburn Montgomery	66
3	Union (TN)	92
6	Western Washington	76
10	Simon Fraser	55
2	Southern Nazarene	69*

Final Four
1	SE Oklahoma State	84
5	Lipscomb	75
3	Union (TN)	69
2	Southern Nazarene	70

National championship
1	SE Oklahoma State	79
2	Southern Nazarene	80

== See also ==
- 1996 NAIA Division I men's basketball tournament
- 1996 NCAA Division I women's basketball tournament
- 1996 NCAA Division II women's basketball tournament
- 1996 NCAA Division III women's basketball tournament
- 1996 NAIA Division II women's basketball tournament
