= 1996 NCAA Division II women's basketball tournament =

American collegiate basketball tournament

- Teams: 48
- Finals site: , Fargo, North Dakota
- Champions: North Dakota State Bison (5th title)
- Runner-up: Shippensburg Raiders (1st title game)
- Third place: Abilene Christian Wildcats (1st Final Four)
- Fourth place: Delta State Lady Statesmen (7th Final Four)
- Winning coach: Amy Ruley (5th title)
- MOP: Kasey Morlock (North Dakota State)

The 1996 NCAA Division II women's basketball tournament was the 15th annual tournament hosted by the NCAA to determine the national champion of Division II women's collegiate basketball in the United States.

Three-time defending champions North Dakota State defeated Shippensburg in the championship game, 104–78, to claim the Bison's fifth NCAA Division II national title. This was North Dakota State's fifth title in six years and fourth of four consecutive titles for the Bison.

The championship rounds were contested in Fargo, North Dakota.

== Regionals ==
=== East - Shippensburg, Pennsylvania ===
Location: Heiges Field House Host: Shippensburg University of Pennsylvania

First round Round of 48; March 7
Kutztown	52
Pitt Johnstown	63
6	Longwood	55
3	Salem-Teikyo	86

Regional semifinals Round of 32; March 8
1	Shippensburg	87
Pitt Johnstown	77
3	Salem-Teikyo	65
2	Slippery Rock	62

Regional finals Sweet 16; March 9
1	Shippensburg	79
3	Salem-Teikyo	68

=== Great Lakes - Louisville, Kentucky ===
Location: Knights Hall Host: Bellarmine College

First round Round of 48; March 7
4	Oakland	83
5	Southern Indiana	84
3	IPFW	71
6	Lake Superior State	79

Regional semifinals Round of 32; March 8
1	Bellarmine	89
5	Southern Indiana	80
6	Lake Superior State	53
2	Northern Michigan	64

Regional finals Sweet 16; March 9
1	Bellarmine	55
2	Northern Michigan	84

=== North Central - Fargo, North Dakota ===
Location: Bison Sports Arena Host: North Dakota State University

First round Round of 48; March 7
6	Metro State	47
3	North Dakota	71
4	Minnesota Duluth	65
5	Northern Colorado	60

Regional semifinals Round of 32; March 8
2	South Dakota State	55
3	North Dakota	68
4	Minnesota Duluth	52
1	North Dakota State	72

Regional finals Sweet 16; March 9
3	North Dakota	77
1	North Dakota State	89

=== Northeast - Waltham, Massachusetts ===
Location: Dana Center Host: Bentley College

First round Round of 48; March 8
6	American International	61
3	Saint Rose	77
4	Bridgeport	82
5	Bryant	79

Regional semifinals Round of 32; March 9
2	Stonehill	60
3	Saint Rose	68
4	Bridgeport	71
1	Bentley	87

Regional finals Sweet 16; March 10
3	Saint Rose	58
1	Bentley	63

=== South - Cleveland, Mississippi ===
Location: Walter Sillers Coliseum Host: Delta State University

First round Round of 48; March 7
Central Arkansas	68
Fort Valley State	55
Albany State	63
Rollins	62

Regional semifinals Round of 32; March 8
2	Florida Southern	97
Central Arkansas	93
Albany State	67
1	Delta State	99

Regional finals Sweet 16; March 9
2	Florida Southern	78
1	Delta State	96

=== South Atlantic - Wingate, North Carolina ===
Location: Cuddy Arena Host: Wingate College

First round Round of 48; March 7
4	Bowie State	74
5	Georgia College	59
6	Gardner–Webb	78
3	Wingate	84

Regional semifinals Round of 32; March 8
1	Shaw	61
4	Bowie State	70
3	Wingate	66
2	Mars Hill	56

Regional finals Sweet 16; March 9
4	Bowie State	56
3	Wingate	85

=== South Central - Abilene, Texas ===
Location: Moody Coliseum Host: Abilene Christian University

First round Round of 48; March 7
5	Missouri–Rolla	60
4	Nebraska–Kearney	83
6	Southwest Baptist	62
3	West Texas A&M	64

Regional semifinals Round of 32; March 8
1	Abilene Christian	81
4	Nebraska–Kearney	58
3	West Texas A&M	71
2	Missouri Southern	59

Regional finals Sweet 16; March 9
1	Abilene Christian	66
3	West Texas A&M	39

=== West - Davis, California ===
Location: Recreation Hall Host: University of California, Davis

First round Round of 48; March 7
6	UC Riverside	59
3	Chico State	68
5	Cal State Dominguez Hills	57
4	Montana State Billings	67

Regional semifinals Round of 32; March 8
2	UC Davis	80
3	Chico State	52
4	Montana State Billings	73
1	Portland State	83

Regional finals Sweet 16; March 9
2	UC Davis	66
1	Portland State	70

== Elite Eight - Fargo, North Dakota ==
Location: Bison Sports Arena Host: North Dakota State University

National quarterfinals Elite Eight; March 20
Shippensburg	78
Wingate	64
Abilene Christian	81
Northern Michigan	76
Delta State	86
Bentley	69
North Dakota State	91
Portland State	65

National semifinals Final Four; March 21
Shippensburg	84
Abilene Christian	81
Delta State	72
North Dakota State	93

National championship Third Place Game; March 23
Shippensburg	78
North Dakota State	104
Third Place Game

== All-tournament team ==
- Kasey Morlock, North Dakota State
- Lori Roufs, North Dakota State
- Jenni Rademacher, North Dakota State
- Jennifer Clarkson, Abilene Christian
- Caroline Omamo, Abilene Christian

== See also ==
- 1996 NCAA Division II men's basketball tournament
- 1996 NCAA Division I women's basketball tournament
- 1996 NCAA Division III women's basketball tournament
- 1996 NAIA Division I women's basketball tournament
- 1996 NAIA Division II women's basketball tournament
