= 1996 NCAA Division II men's basketball tournament =

- Teams: 48
- Finals site: Commonwealth Convention Center, Louisville, Kentucky
- Champions: Fort Hays State (1st title)
- Runner-up: Northern Kentucky (1st title game)
- Semifinalists: California (PA) (2nd Final Four); Virginia Union (4th Final Four)
- Winning coach: Gary Garner (1st title)
- MOP: Sherick Simpson (FHSU)

The 1996 NCAA Division II men's basketball tournament was the 40th annual single-elimination tournament to determine the national champion of men's NCAA Division II college basketball in the United States.

The tournament, which featured forty-eight teams, culminated the 1995–96 NCAA Division II men's basketball season.

The Elite Eight, national semifinals, and championship were played at the Commonwealth Convention Center in Louisville, Kentucky.

Fort Hays State (34–0) defeated Northern Kentucky in the final, 70–63, to win their first Division II national title.

1996 NCAA Division II Men's sites - regionals (cyan) Elite Eight (red)

== Regionals ==
=== East - California, Pennsylvania ===
Location: Hamer Hall Host: California University of Pennsylvania

First round Round of 48; March 7
4 | Bloomsburg | 82
5 | Edinboro | 90
3 | Fairmont State | 78
6 | Bluefield State | 66

Regional semifinals Round of 32; March 8
1 | California (PA) | 84
5 | Edinboro | 76
2 | Indiana (PA) | 84
3 | Fairmont State | 83

Regional final Sweet 16; March 9
1 | California (PA) | 78
2 | Indiana (PA) | 68

=== South - Normal, Alabama ===
Location: Elmore Coliseum Host: Alabama A&M University

First round Round of 48; March 7
4 | South Carolina-Spartanburg | 91
5 | Clark Atlanta | 71
3 | Columbus (OT) | 88
6 | Rollins | 80

Regional semifinals Round of 32; March 8
1 | Alabama A&M | 106
4 | South Carolina-Spartanburg | 91
2 | Florida Southern | 77
3 | Columbus | 83

Regional final Sweet 16; March 9
1 | Alabama A&M | 98
3 | Columbus | 82

=== North Central - Hays, Kansas ===
Location: Gross Memorial Coliseum Host: Fort Hays State University

First round Round of 48; March 8
4 | Nebraska–Kearney | 70
5 | Regis (CO) | 73
3 | Denver | 70
6 | North Dakota State | 71

Regional semifinals Round of 32; March 9
1 | Fort Hays State | 97
5 | Regis | 69
2 | South Dakota State | 94
6 | North Dakota State | 88

Regional final Sweet 16; March 10
1 | Fort Hays State | 99
2 | South Dakota State | 90

=== South Central - Rolla, Missouri ===
Location: Gale Bullman Multi-Purpose Building Host: University of Missouri at Rolla

First round Round of 48; March 7
4 | Central Missouri State (OT) | 89
5 | East Texas State | 86
3 | North Alabama | 78
6 | Delta State | 69

Regional semifinals Round of 32; March 8
1 | Missouri-Rolla | 72
4 | Central Missouri State | 67
2 | Texas A&M–Kingsville | 80
3 | North Alabama | 85

Regional final Sweet 16; March 9
1 | Missouri-Rolla | 80
3 | North Alabama | 92

=== Northeast - Loudonville, New York ===
Location: Alumni Recreation Center Host: Siena College

First round Round of 48; March 8
4 | Franklin Pierce | 83
5 | Le Moyne | 53
3 | Adelphi | 52
6 | New Hampshire College | 68

Regional semifinals Round of 32; March 9
1 | St. Anselm | 78
4 | Franklin Pierce | 70
2 | St. Rose | 83
6 | New Hampshire College | 82

Regional final Sweet 16; March 10
1 | St. Anselm | 76
2 | St. Rose | 87

=== South Atlantic - Richmond, Virginia ===
Location: Arthur Ashe Athletic Center Host: Virginia Union University

First round Round of 48; March 6
4 | North Carolina Central | 62
5 | Pfeiffer | 71
3 | High Point | 76
6 | Presbyterian | 67

Regional semifinals Round of 32; March 7
1 | Virginia Union | 49
5 | Pfeiffer | 47
2 | Queens (NC) | 81
3 | High Point | 70

Regional final Sweet 16; March 8
1 | Virginia Union | 81
2 | Queens (NC) | 58

=== Great Lakes - Evansville, Indiana ===
Location: Physical Activities Center Host: University of Southern Indiana

First round Round of 48; March 7
4 | Indianapolis | 105
5 | Lake Superior State | 81
3 | Northern State | 98
6 | Oakland | 92

Regional semifinals Round of 32; March 8
1 | Southern Indiana | 75
4 | Indianapolis | 71
2 | Northern Kentucky | 82
3 | Northern State | 71

Regional final Sweet 16; March 9
1 | Southern Indiana | 87
2 | Northern Kentucky | 99

=== West - Bakersfield, California ===
Location: CSUB Student Activities Center Host: California State University, Bakersfield

First round Round of 48; March 7
4 | Alaska-Anchorage | 96
5 | Grand Canyon (OT) | 105
3 | Cal Davis | 89
6 | Montana State-Billings | 80

Regional semifinals Round of 32; March 8
1 | Cal State Bakersfield | 71
5 | Grand Canyon | 65
2 | Seattle Pacific | 79
3 | Cal Davis | 65

Regional final Sweet 16; March 9
1 | Cal State Bakersfield | 78
2 | Seattle Pacific | 65

== Elite Eight-Louisville, Kentucky ==
Location: Commonwealth Convention Center Host: Bellarmine College

National Quarterfinals; Elite Eight; March 20
E | California (PA) | 95
S | Alabama A&M | 85
NC | Fort Hays State | 71
SC | North Alabama | 68
Louisville, Kentucky
SA | Virginia Union | 99
NE | Saint Rose | 72
GL | Northern Kentucky | 56
W | Cal State Bakersfield | 55

National semifinals Final Four; March 21
E | California (PA) | 56
NC | Fort Hays State | 76
SA | Virginia Union | 66
GL | Northern Kentucky | 68

National championship March 23
NC | Fort Hays State | 70
GL | Northern Kentucky | 63

== All-tournament team ==
- Sherick Simpson, Fort Hays State
- Paul Cluxton, Northern Kentucky
- LaRon Moore, Northern Kentucky
- Alonzo Goldston, Fort Hays State
- Kebu Stewart, Cal State Bakersfield

== See also ==
- 1996 NCAA Division II women's basketball tournament
- 1996 NCAA Division I men's basketball tournament
- 1996 NCAA Division III men's basketball tournament
- 1996 NAIA Division I men's basketball tournament
- 1996 NAIA Division II men's basketball tournament
