= 1996 NAIA Division I men's basketball tournament =

College basketball tournament

- Teams: 32
- Finals site: Mabee Center; Tulsa, Oklahoma
- Champions: Oklahoma City (4 title, 4 title game, 4 Fab Four)
- Runner-up: Georgetown (KY) (2 title game, 6 Fab Four)
- Semifinalists: Lipscomb (3 Final Four); Belmont (1 Final Four)
- Charles Stevenson Hustle Award: Shannon Hoskins (Georgetown (KY))
- Chuck Taylor MVP: Reggie Garrett (Oklahoma City)

The 1996 NAIA Men's Division I Basketball Tournament was held in March at Mabee Center in Tulsa, Oklahoma. The 59th annual NAIA basketball tournament featured 32 teams playing in a single-elimination format.

== Awards and honors ==
- Leading scorers:
- Leading rebounder:
- Player of the Year: Jason Cason (Birmingham Southern).

== 1996 NAIA bracket ==
First round	Second round
1	Georgetown (KY)	116
-	North Georgia	68
1	Georgetown (KY)	78
-	Arkansas Tech	49
-	Arkansas Tech	68
-	Lewis–Clark State	60
TOP TIER
-	Geneva	74
9	Montana State–Northern	69
-	Geneva	81
8	Oklahoma Baptist	79
8	Oklahoma Baptist	75
-	St. Mary's (TX)	69
5	BYU–Hawaii	83
-	St. Francis (IL)	68
5	BYU–Hawaii	60
-	East Central	66
-	East Central	62
12	Azusa Pacific	60
TOP TIER
4	Lipscomb	91
-	Talladega	78
4	Lipscomb	95
-	McKendree	87
-	McKendree	73
13	East Texas Baptist	69
3	The Master’s	72
-	Claflin	64
3	The Master’s	85
14	Oklahoma City	108
14	Oklahoma City	94
-	St. Xavier	58
BOTTOM TIER
-	Findlay	68
11	Harding	65
-	Findlay	69
6	Birmingham Southern	72
6	Birmingham–Southern	88
-	Westmont	75
7	Hawaii Pacific	74
-	SE Oklahoma State	72*
7	Hawaii Pacific	64
10	Cumberlands	89
10	Cumberlands	65
-	Columbia (MO)	58
BOTTOM TIER
-	Belmont	57
15	Westminster (PA)	54
-	Belmont	74
2	Life	73
2	Life	79
-	Xavier (LA)	72

Elite Eight
1	Georgetown (KY)	93
-	Geneva	77
-	East Central	75
4	Lipscomb	93
14	Oklahoma City	82
6	Birmingham Southern	66
10	Cumberlands	65
-	Belmont	66

NAIA national semifinals
1	Georgetown (KY)	97
4	Lipscomb	84
14	Oklahoma City	97
-	Belmont	77

NAIA national championship
1	Georgetown (KY)	80
14	Oklahoma City	86

- * denotes overtime.

== See also ==
- 1996 NAIA Division I women's basketball tournament
- 1996 NCAA Division I men's basketball tournament
- 1996 NCAA Division II men's basketball tournament
- 1996 NCAA Division III men's basketball tournament
- 1996 NAIA Division II men's basketball tournament
