= 1996 NAIA Division II men's basketball tournament =

- Teams: 32
- Finals site: Montgomery Fieldhouse; Nampa, Idaho
- Champions: Albertson Coyotes (1st title, 1st title game, 1st Fab Four)
- Runner-up: Whitworth Pirates (1st title game, 1st Fab Four)
- Semifinalists: Walsh Cavaliers (1st Fab Four); William Jewell Cardinals (3rd Fab Four)
- Charles Stevenson Hustle Award: Bob Boldon (Walsh)
- Chuck Taylor MVP: Damon Archibald (Albertson)
- Top scorer: Brook Russell (William Jewell) (116 points)

The 1996 NAIA Division II men's basketball tournament was the tournament held by the NAIA to determine the national champion of men's college basketball among its Division II members in the United States and Canada for the 1995–96 basketball season.

Albertson defeated Whitworth in the championship game, 81–72 after overtime, to claim the Coyotes' first NAIA national title.

The tournament was played at the Montgomery Fieldhouse at Northwest Nazarene University in Nampa, Idaho.

== Qualification ==
The tournament field remained fixed at thirty-two teams, and the top sixteen teams were seeded.

The tournament continued to utilize a single-elimination format.

== Bracket ==
First round
1 | Bethel (IN) | 98
Mayville State | 58
Berea | 91
16 | Tabor | 92
9 | William Jewell | 85
Holy Family | 74
Bluefield | 84
8 | Embry–Riddle (FL) | 88
5 | Concordia Nebraska | 66
Northwest Nazarene | 74
Caldwell | 91
12 | Trinity International | 100
13 | MidAmerica Nazarene | 73
Siena Heights | 70
Howard Payne | 73
4 | Whitworth | 103
3 | Albertson | 83
Northland | 68
Lewis & Clark | 70
14 | Taylor | 64
11 | Mount Mercy | 94
Philadelphia Pharmacy | 78
Wisconsin Lutheran | 90
6 | Saint Joseph's (ME) | 74
7 | Western Oregon | 66
Huron | 71
Doane | 87
10 | College of the Ozarks | 74
15 | Alice Lloyd | 71
Baker (KS) | 62
Green Mountain | 83
2 | Walsh | 92

Second round
1 | Bethel (IN) | 72
16 | Tabor | 90
9 | William Jewell | 89
8 | Embry–Riddle (FL) | 82
Northwest Nazarene | 97
12 | Trinity International | 81
13 | MidAmerica Nazarene | 71
4 | Whitworth | 81
3 | Albertson | 66
Lewis & Clark | 64
11 | Mount Mercy | 68
Wisconsin Lutheran | 70
Huron | 79
Doane | 84
15 | Alice Lloyd | 81
2 | Walsh | 85

Quarterfinals
16 | Tabor | 71
9 | William Jewell | 85
Northwest Nazarene | 70
4 | Whitworth | 88
3 | Albertson | 87
Wisconsin Lutheran | 79
Doane | 76
2 | Walsh | 82

Semifinals
9 | William Jewell | 83
4 | Whitworth | 87
3 | Albertson | 92
2 | Walsh | 79

National championship
4 | Whitworth | 72
3 | Albertson | 81*

== See also ==
- 1996 NAIA Division I men's basketball tournament
- 1996 NCAA Division I men's basketball tournament
- 1996 NCAA Division II men's basketball tournament
- 1996 NCAA Division III men's basketball tournament
- 1996 NAIA Division II women's basketball tournament
