= 1996 NCAA Division III men's basketball tournament =

American collegiate men's basketball tournament (1996)

- Teams: 64
- Finals site: , Salem, Virginia
- Champions: Rowan Profs (1st title)
- Runner-up: Hope Flying Dutchmen (1st title game)
- Semifinalists: Illinois Wesleyan Titans (1st Final Four); Franklin & Marshall Diplomats (3rd Final Four)
- Winning coach: John Giannini (Rowan)
- MOP: Terrence Stewart (Rowan)
- Attendance: 67,695

The 1996 NCAA Division III men's basketball tournament was the 22nd annual single-elimination tournament to determine the national champions of National Collegiate Athletic Association (NCAA) men's Division III collegiate basketball in the United States.

The field contained sixty-four teams, each allocated to one of four sectionals played on campus sites. The national semifinals, third-place final, and championship final, meanwhile, were contested at the Salem Civic Center in Salem, Virginia. Salem would remain the home of the Division III final four through the 2017–18 season.

Rowan defeated Hope, 100–93, in the final, clinching their first national title.

The Profs (28–4) were coached by John Giannini. Giannini would go on to coach at Maine and La Salle at the Division I level.

== Bracket ==
=== Top left sectional ===
First round
RIT	51
Geneseo State	73
Buffalo State	74
St. John Fisher	65
Wilkes	87
Allentown	72
Cabrini	85
Catholic	65
Hamilton	78
St. Lawrence	85
Hartwick	55
RPI	68
Lycoming	103
Gettysburg	75
Franklin & Marshall	118
Salisbury State	69

Second round
Geneseo State	61
Buffalo State	71
Wilkes	96*
Cabrini	91
St. Lawrence	70
RPI	78
Lycoming	61
Franklin & Marshall	72

Sectional semifinals
Buffalo State	59
Wilkes	64
RPI	58
Franklin & Marshall	74

Sectional finals
Wilkes	70
Franklin & Marshall	107

=== Bottom left sectional ===
First round
UW–Platteville	77
UW–Whitewater	85
Upper Iowa	58
Claremont–Mudd–Scripps	70
Hope	65
Kalamazoo	62
John Carroll	86
Wooster	72
UW–Oshkosh	79
Simpson (IA)	74
Gustavus Adolphus	72
Concordia–Moorhead	61
Ohio Northern	57
Capital	68
Wittenberg	70
Baldwin Wallace	61

Second round
UW–Whitewater	63
Claremont–Mudd–Scripps	62
Hope	80
John Carroll	61
UW–Oshkosh	60
Gustavus Adolphus	61**
Capital	60
Wittenberg	65

Sectional semifinals
UW–Whitewater	66
Hope	88
Gustavus Adolphus	68
Wittenberg	76

Sectional finals
Hope	69
Wittenberg	60

=== Top right sectional ===
First round
Williams	78
Plymouth State	62
Bowdoin	62
Springfield	56
Rowan	130
York (NY)	66
Staten Island	63
Jersey City State	73
Anna Maria	111
Babson	90
Salem State	76
Western Connecticut	60
NYU	105
NJIT	88
Richard Stockton	80
Mount Saint Vincent	54

Second round
Williams	91
Bowdoin	64
Rowan	102
Jersey City State	83
Anna Maria	74
Salem State	67
NYU	77
Richard Stockton	81*

Sectional semifinals
Williams	77
Rowan	85
Anna Maria	88
Richard Stockton	95

Sectional finals
Rowan	98
Richard Stockton	70

=== Bottom right sectional ===
First round
Wheaton (IL)	131
Grinnell	117
Washington–St. Louis	76
Rose–Hulman	74
Randolph–Macon	57
Christopher Newport	66
Millsaps	83
Bridgewater (VA)	72
Hanover	85
Fontbonne	43
Illinois Wesleyan	77
Ripon	66
Hendrix	97
Stillman	85
Roanoke	128
Shenandoah	110

Second round
Wheaton (IL)	75
Washington–St. Louis	93
Christopher Newport	73
Millsaps	69
Hanover	67
Illinois Wesleyan	73
Hendrix	64
Roanoke	80

Sectional semifinals
Washington–St. Louis	87
Christopher Newport	71
Illinois Wesleyan	116
Roanoke	88

Sectional finals
Washington–St. Louis	61
Illinois Wesleyan	73

=== National finals ===
- Site: Salem Civic Center, Salem, Virginia

National Semifinals
Franklin & Marshall	57
Hope	76
Rowan	79
Illinois Wesleyan	66

National Championship
Hope	93
Rowan	100
National Third-place
Franklin & Marshall	57
Illinois Wesleyan	89

== All-tournament team ==
- Terrence Stewart, Rowan
- Antwan Dasher, Rowan
- Joel Holstege, Hope
- Duane Bosma, Hope
- Chris Simich, Illinois Wesleyan

== See also ==
- 1996 NCAA Division III women's basketball tournament
- 1996 NCAA Division I men's basketball tournament
- 1996 NCAA Division II men's basketball tournament
- 1996 NAIA Division I men's basketball tournament
- 1996 NAIA Division II men's basketball tournament
