= Nadine Domond =

American basketball coach and player

Morgan State Lady Bears
- Title: Head coach
- League: MEAC

Personal information
- Born: September 28, 1975 (age 51) Stamford, Connecticut, U.S.
- Listed height: 5 ft 7 in (1.70 m)
- Listed weight: 148 lb (67 kg)

Career information
- High school: Central (Bridgeport, Connecticut)
- College: Iowa (1994–1998)
- WNBA draft: 1998: 2nd round, 19th overall pick
- Drafted by: New York Liberty
- Position: Guard
- Number: 3

Career history

Playing
- 1998: Sacramento Monarchs

Coaching
- 2002–2003: Hampton (grad assistant)
- 2003–2005: Hampton (assistant)
- 2005–2007: Apprentice School (AHC)
- 2012–2014: Salem HS (VA) (assistant)
- 2014–2016: Grambling State
- 2016–2022: Rutgers (assistant)
- 2022–2025: Virginia State
- 2025–: Morgan State

Career highlights
- As player: Second-team All-Big Ten (1998)
- Stats at Basketball Reference

Nadine Domond (born September 28, 1975) is an American professional basketball coach and former player and All-American formerly ranked as the number one point guard in the country coming out of high school. Domond played for the Sacramento Monarchs of the Women's National Basketball Association. She coached Grambling State women's basketball team in 2014.

== Biography ==
Nadine Domond is a basketball player and entrepreneur, who was born in 1975 in Stamford, Connecticut. Her two parents, Evelyne and Delouis Domond, emigrated here to America from Haiti. Domond was already playing basketball at an elite level since high school when she led her team to the state title. She graduated as an All-American basketball star from Bridgeport Central High School in Connecticut in 1994 as the #1 point guard in the country her senior year. Soon after, she went on to play at University of Iowa for the next four years. Here she played under the Hall of Famer Vivian Stringer (1994–1995) and earned second team All-Big 10 honors for field goals made, fifth in assists, and seventh in steals during her senior year. Domond is also the all-time #5 Hawkeye (Iowa) 3-point shooting record holder. After graduation, she played overseas in France, Poland, Israel, and the WNBA (19th overall pick in 1988 by Sacramento Monarchs). As she got older she began coaching. First she was an assistant coach at Hapton University (2002), and then she coached the Apprentice School women's basketball program (2005).

== High school ==
Domond scored 2,300 points at Bridgeport Central High School. She helped lead the Hilltoppers to the 1994 Class LL championship. She received numerous honors in high school: induction into the New England Basketball Hall of Fame, Parade High School All-American, Kodak High School All-American, USA High School All-American, #1 Point Guard in the Country during her high school senior year, Division I College Basketball Standout at the University of Iowa, USA Selected Team, and USA Junior National Team Silver Medal Team Member.

== College ==
At University of Iowa (Hawkeyes) for the next four years (1994–1998), Domond earned a degree in African American World Studies and Instructional Design. In basketball, her freshmen year, Domond played on the last team coached by legendary women's basketball coach C. Vivian Stringer during her 1994–1995 year. During the next three years, under the new coach Angie Lee, Domond and the Hawkeyes (Iowa) were the Big Ten Champions and also made it to the Sweet Sixteen NCAA Tournament in 1996. During this time, Domond played for other USA national teams including one team that won the silver medal in 1997 US Jones Cup. As of 2010, Domond was the #5 all-time Hawkeye women's 3-point shooting.

== Professional career ==
=== WNBA ===
Domond was drafted right after graduating as the #19 overall pick and played nine games for the Sacramento Monarchs in the 1998 WNBA season.

=== International play ===
Domond played basketball in France, Poland, and Israel. While playing in Israel, she helped lead her team, Bnei Yehuda, to the championship playoffs for the first time in franchise history. In Poland, she helped lead the Color Cap Rybnik to the final four for the first time in franchise history.

== International competition ==
Domond was a member of the Silver Medal Jones Cup Team.

== Personal life ==
Domond has organized events to feed the homeless and clothe the needy. She received a Bachelor of Arts in Instruction Design/African-American Studies from the University of Iowa.

== Career statistics ==
Legend
GP	Games played	GS	Games started	MPG	Minutes per game	RPG	Rebounds per game
APG	Assists per game	SPG	Steals per game	BPG	Blocks per game	PPG	Points per game
TO	Turnovers per game	FG%	Field-goal percentage	3P%	3-point field-goal percentage	FT%	Free-throw percentage
**Bold**	Career best	°	League leader

=== WNBA ===
==== Regular season ====
Year	Team	GP	GS	MPG	FG%	3P%	FT%	RPG	APG	SPG	BPG	TO	PPG
1998	Sacramento	9	0	10.2	.303	.188	1.000	1.0	1.0	.8	.1	1.2	3.0
