= Central High School (Connecticut) =

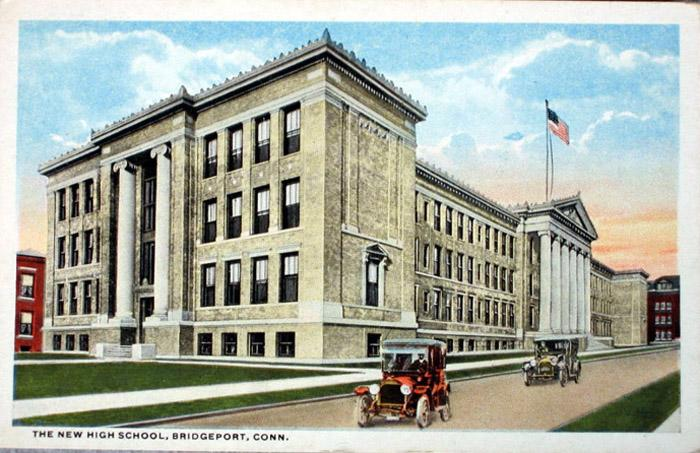
- Central High School in the early 20th century

Location
- 1 Lincoln Boulevard; Bridgeport, Connecticut 06606; United States; 41°11′20″N 73°12′21″W

Information
- Type: Public school
- Motto: REAL (By industry we thrive)
- Established: 1876 (150 years ago)
- CEEB code: 070055
- Principal: Eric Graf
- Enrollment: 1,515 (2016-17)
- Campus: Urban
- Colors: Black and red
- Team name: Hilltoppers
- Website: central.bridgeportedu.net

Central High School is a high school in Bridgeport, Fairfield County, Connecticut in the United States. It was founded in 1876 as Bridgeport High School.

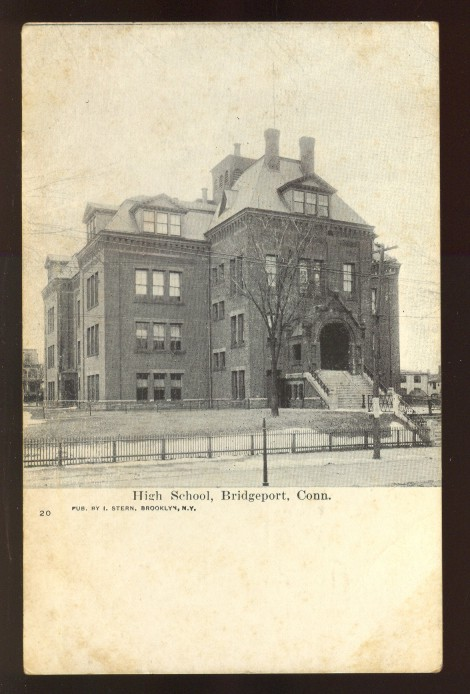
About 1905

In 2003 the school held 2,217 students and 152 teachers. Ethnically the students were 41% African-American, 41% Hispanic, 13% white and 4% Asian, with .1% marked as unknown.

The current school building was constructed in 1963–4, and was dedicated on October 25, 1964. The school is under renovation scheduled to be complete in 2021.

== Notable alumni ==
- Al Capp, cartoonist (failed to graduate)
- Kiddo Davis, MLB outfielder.
- Michael Jai White, actor
- Fred De Luca, Subway restaurant's co-founder
- John Mayer's father, Richard, was principal of Central High School
- Greg McCarthy, former MLB player (Seattle Mariners)
- Kevin Nealon, comedian, Saturday Night Live
- John Schick, former professional basketball player (Toledo Jeeps)
- Vinnie Vincent, guitarist, Kiss, Vinnie Vincent Invasion
- Deborah Walley, actress
- Trevardo Williams, professional NFL player (Houston Texans)
- Vincent Zarrilli, businessman
- Nadine Domond, NCAA Basketball Coach (Morgan State University)

== See also ==
- John F. Kennedy Stadium (Bridgeport)
