= 1996 NCAA Division I women's basketball tournament =

American college basketball tournament

- Teams: 64
- Finals site: Charlotte Coliseum, Charlotte, North Carolina
- Champions: Tennessee Volunteers (4th title, 6th title game, 9th Final Four)
- Runner-up: Georgia Bulldogs (2nd title game, 4th Final Four)
- Semifinalists: Connecticut Huskies (3rd Final Four); Stanford Cardinal (5th Final Four)
- Winning coach: Pat Summitt (4th title)
- MOP: Michelle Marciniak (Tennessee)

The 1996 NCAA Division I women's basketball tournament took place from March 15–31, 1996. The Final Four consisted of Connecticut, Georgia, Stanford, and Tennessee. Tennessee defeated Georgia 83–65 in the championship game.

== Tournament records ==
- Three-point field goal percentage – Nykesha Sales, Connecticut, hit four of five three-point field goal attempts (80%) in the semi-final game against Tennessee, tying a record for three-point field goal percentage in a Final Four game, held by four other players.
- Three-point field goal percentage – Abby Conklin, Tennessee hit four of five three-point field goal attempts (80%) in the championship game against Georgia, tying a record for three-point field goal percentage in a Final Four game, held by four other players.
- Three-point field goals – Harvard hit 16 three-point field goals in a Mideast first-round game, setting the record for most three-point field goals in an NCAA tournament game, subsequently tied by two other teams.

== Qualifying teams – automatic ==
Sixty-four teams were selected to participate in the 1996 NCAA Tournament. Thirty-one conferences were eligible for an automatic bid.

Automatic bids
		Record		
Qualifying School	Conference	Regular Season	Conference	Seed
Appalachian State University	Southern Conference	24–5	14–0	13
Austin Peay State University	Ohio Valley Conference	21–7	13–3	14
Butler University	Midwestern Collegiate	21–8	13–3	15
Clemson University	ACC	22–7	9–7	3
University of Colorado at Boulder	Big Eight	25–8	9–5	3
Colorado State University	WAC	25–4	12–2	8
University of Connecticut	Big East	30–3	17–1	1
The George Washington University	Atlantic 10	25–6	14–2	6
Grambling State University	SWAC	21–6	13–1	16
Harvard University	Ivy League	20–6	13–1	14
University of Hawaiʻi at Mānoa	Big West Conference	23–5	15–3	11
College of the Holy Cross	Patriot League	23–9	9–3	15
Howard University	MEAC	20–9	13–3	16
Louisiana Tech University	Sun Belt Conference	28–1	14–0	1
University of Maine	North Atlantic Conference	27–4	18–0	11
Manhattan College	MAAC	19–10	11–3	14
University of Memphis	Conference USA	20–10	10–4	8
Missouri State University	Missouri Valley Conference	25–4	16–2	12
University of Montana	Big Sky Conference	24–4	13–1	12
Old Dominion University	Colonial	27–2	16–0	2
Pennsylvania State University	Big Ten	25–6	13–3	2
Radford University	Big South Conference	17–11	10–4	16
University of San Francisco	West Coast Conference	22–7	12–2	12
St. Francis (PA)	Northeast Conference	19–10	13–5	15
Stanford University	Pac-10	25–2	18–0	1
Stephen F. Austin State University	Southland	25–3	18–0	11
University of Tennessee	SEC	26–4	9–2	1
Texas A&M University	Southwest	20–11	8–6	7
University of Toledo	MAC	24–5	15–3	10
University of Central Florida	Trans America	15–13	7–8	16
Youngstown State University	Mid-Continent	20–8	14–4	15

== Qualifying teams – at-large ==
Thirty-three additional teams were selected to complete the sixty-four invitations.

At-large Bids
		Record		
Qualifying School	Conference	Regular Season	Conference	Seed
University of Alabama	Southeastern	22–7	7–4	4
Auburn University	Southeastern	20–8	6–5	6
DePaul University	Conference USA	20–9	13–1	7
Duke University	Atlantic Coast	25–6	12–4	4
University of Florida	Southeastern	21–8	6–5	5
University of Georgia	Southeastern	23–4	10–1	2
University of Iowa	Big Ten	25–3	15–1	2
James Madison University	Colonial	21–8	12–4	13
University of Kansas	Big Eight	20–9	11–3	4
Kent State University	Mid-American	23–6	16–2	10
University of Massachusetts	Atlantic 10	20–9	11–5	8
Michigan State University	Big Ten	17–10	9–7	9
Middle Tennessee State University	Ohio Valley	24–5	13–3	13
University of Mississippi (Ole Miss)	Southeastern	18–10	6–5	7
University of Nebraska–Lincoln	Big Eight	19–9	8–6	9
North Carolina State University	Atlantic Coast	19–9	10–6	5
University of Notre Dame	Big East	22–7	15–3	12
Ohio State University	Big Ten	20–12	8–8	9
Oklahoma State University–Stillwater	Big Eight	19–9	8–6	7
University of Oregon	Pacific-10	18–10	10–8	11
Oregon State University	Pacific-10	19–10	11–7	6
University of Portland	West Coast	23–6	12–2	13
Purdue University	Big Ten	20–10	11–5	5
University of Rhode Island	Atlantic 10	21–7	13–3	10
Southern Methodist University	Southwest	19–10	9–5	10
University of Southern Mississippi	Conference USA	21–7	11–3	9
University of Texas at Austin	Southwest	20–8	13–1	5
Texas Tech University	Southwest	25–4	13–1	4
Tulane University	Conference USA	21–9	9–5	14
University of Utah	Western Athletic	21–7	12–2	8
Vanderbilt University	Southeastern	20–7	7–4	3
University of Virginia	Atlantic Coast	23–6	13–3	3
University of Wisconsin–Madison	Big Ten	20–7	12–4	6

== Bids by conference ==
Thirty-one conferences earned an automatic bid. In seventeen cases, the automatic bid was the only representative from the conference. Thirty-three additional at-large teams were selected from fourteen of the conferences.

Bids	Conference	Teams
7	Southeastern	Tennessee, Alabama, Auburn, Florida, Georgia, Ole Miss, Vanderbilt
6	Big Ten	Penn St., Iowa, Michigan St., Ohio St., Purdue, Wisconsin
4	Atlantic Coast	Clemson, Duke, North Carolina St., Virginia
4	Big Eight	Colorado, Kansas, Nebraska, Oklahoma St.
4	Conference USA	Memphis, DePaul, Southern Miss., Tulane
4	Southwest	Texas A&M, SMU, Texas, Texas Tech
3	Atlantic 10	George Washington, Massachusetts, Rhode Island
3	Pacific-10	Stanford, Oregon, Oregon St.
2	Big East	Connecticut, Notre Dame
2	Colonial	Old Dominion, James Madison
2	Mid-American	Toledo, Kent St.
2	Ohio Valley	Austin Peay, Middle Tenn.
2	West Coast	San Francisco, Portland
2	Western Athletic	Colorado St., Utah
1	Big Sky	Montana
1	Big South	Radford
1	Big West	Hawaii
1	Ivy	Harvard
1	Metro Atlantic	Manhattan
1	Mid-Continent	Youngstown St.
1	Mid-Eastern	Howard
1	Midwestern Collegiate	Butler
1	Missouri Valley	Missouri St.
1	North Atlantic	Maine
1	Northeast	St. Francis (PA)
1	Patriot	Holy Cross
1	Southern	Appalachian St.
1	Southland	Stephen F. Austin
1	Southwestern	Grambling State
1	Sun Belt	Louisiana Tech
1	Trans-America	UCF

== First and second rounds ==
1996 NCAA NCAA first and second round venues

In 1996, the field remained at 64 teams. The teams were seeded, and assigned to four geographic regions, with seeds 1-16 in each region. In Round 1, seeds 1 and 16 faced each other, as well as seeds 2 and 15, seeds 3 and 14, seeds 4 and 13, seeds 5 and 12, seeds 6 and 11, seeds 7 and 10, and seeds 8 and 9. In the first two rounds, the top four seeds were given the opportunity to host the first-round game. In all cases, the higher seed accepted the opportunity.

The following table lists the region, host school, venue and the sixteen first and second round locations:

Region	Rnd	Host	Venue	City	State
East	1&2	Old Dominion University	Old Dominion University Fieldhouse	Norfolk	Virginia
East	1&2	University of Virginia	University Hall (University of Virginia)	Charlottesville	Virginia
East	1&2	University of Tennessee	Thompson-Boling Arena	Knoxville	Tennessee
East	1&2	University of Kansas	Allen Field House	Lawrence	Kansas
Mideast	1&2	University of Iowa	Carver–Hawkeye Arena	Iowa City	Iowa
Mideast	1&2	University of Connecticut	Harry A. Gampel Pavilion	Storrs	Connecticut
Mideast	1&2	Vanderbilt University	Memorial Gymnasium (Vanderbilt University)	Nashville	Tennessee
Mideast	1&2	Duke University	Cameron Indoor Stadium	Durham	North Carolina
Midwest	1&2	University of Georgia	Georgia Coliseum (Stegeman Coliseum)	Athens	Georgia
Midwest	1&2	Louisiana Tech University	Thomas Assembly Center	Ruston	Louisiana
Midwest	1&2	Clemson University	Littlejohn Coliseum	Clemson	South Carolina
Midwest	1&2	Texas Tech University	Lubbock Municipal Coliseum	Lubbock	Texas
West	1&2	Pennsylvania State University	Recreation Building (Rec Hall)	University Park	Pennsylvania
West	1&2	University of Colorado	CU Events Center (Coors Events Center)	Boulder	Colorado
West	1&2	Stanford University	Maples Pavilion	Stanford	California
West	1&2	University of Alabama	Coleman Coliseum	Tuscaloosa	Alabama

== Regionals and Final Four ==
1996 NCAA regionals and Final Four

The Regionals, named for the general location, were held from March 23 to March 25 at these sites:

- East Regional University Hall (University of Virginia), Charlottesville, Virginia (Host: University of Virginia)
- Midwest Regional William R. Johnson Coliseum, Nacogdoches, Texas (Host: Stephen F. Austin University)
- West Regional Hec Edmundson Pavilion, Seattle, Washington (Host: University of Washington)
- Mideast Regional Rosemont Horizon, Rosemont, Illinois (Host: DePaul University)

Each regional winner advanced to the Final Four held on March 29 and March 31 in Charlotte, North Carolina at the Charlotte Coliseum, (co-hosted by Davidson College and UNC Charlotte).

== Bids by state ==
The sixty-four teams came from thirty-two states, plus Washington, D.C. Texas and Tennessee had the most teams with five bids. Eighteen states did not have any teams receiving bids.

NCAA Women's basketball Tournament invitations by state 1996

Bids	State	Teams
5	Tennessee	Austin Peay, Memphis, Tennessee, Middle Tenn., Vanderbilt
5	Texas	Stephen F. Austin, Texas A&M, SMU, Texas, Texas Tech
4	Ohio	Toledo, Youngstown St., Kent St., Ohio St.
4	Virginia	Old Dominion, Radford, James Madison, Virginia
3	Indiana	Butler, Notre Dame, Purdue
3	Louisiana	Grambling State, Louisiana Tech, Tulane
3	Massachusetts	Harvard, Holy Cross, Massachusetts
3	North Carolina	Appalachian St., Duke, North Carolina St.
3	Oregon	Oregon, Oregon St., Portland
2	Alabama	Alabama, Auburn
2	California	San Francisco, Stanford
2	Colorado	Colorado, Colorado St.
2	District of Columbia	George Washington, Howard
2	Florida	UCF, Florida
2	Mississippi	Ole Miss, Southern Miss.
1	New York	Manhattan
1	Connecticut	Connecticut
1	Georgia	Georgia
1	Hawaii	Hawaii
1	Illinois	DePaul
1	Iowa	Iowa
1	Kansas	Kansas
1	Maine	Maine
1	Michigan	Michigan St.
1	Missouri	Missouri St.
1	Montana	Montana
1	Nebraska	Nebraska
1	Oklahoma	Oklahoma St.
2	Pennsylvania	Penn St., St Francis
1	Rhode Island	Rhode Island
1	South Carolina	Clemson
1	Utah	Utah
1	Wisconsin	Wisconsin

== Brackets ==
=== East Region – Charlottesville, Virginia ===
First round March 15 and 16
1	Tennessee	97
16	Radford	56
Knoxville, TN – Sat/Mon
8	Memphis	75
9	Ohio State	97
5	Texas	73
12	Southwest Missouri State	55
Lawrence, KS – Sat/Mon
4	Kansas	72
13	Middle Tennessee State	57
6	George Washington	83
11	Maine	67
Charlottesville, VA – Fri/Sun
3	Virginia	100
14	Manhattan	55
7	Ole Miss	53
10	Toledo	65
Norfolk, VA – Sat/Mon
2	Old Dominion	83
15	Holy Cross	56

Second round March 17 and 18
1	Tennessee	97
9	Ohio State	65
5	Texas	70
4	Kansas	77
6	George Washington	43
3	Virginia	62
10	Toledo	66
2	Old Dominion	72

Regional semifinals March 23
1	Tennessee	92
4	Kansas	71
3	Virginia	72
2	Old Dominion	60

Regional finals March 25
1	Tennessee	52
3	Virginia	46

=== Mideast Region – Rosemont, Illinois ===
First round March 15 and 16
1	Connecticut	94
16	Howard	63
Storrs, CT – Sat/Mon
8	Massachusetts	57
9	Michigan State	60^{OT}
5	Florida	61
12	San Francisco	68
Durham, NC – Sat/Mon
4	Duke	85
13	James Madison	53
6	Wisconsin	74
11	Oregon	60
Nashville, TN – Fri/Sun
3	Vanderbilt	100
14	Harvard	83
7	DePaul	96
10	SMU	82
Iowa City, IA – Fri/Sun
2	Iowa	72
15	Butler	67

Second round March 17 and 18
1	Connecticut	88
9	Michigan State	68
12	San Francisco	64
4	Duke	60
6	Wisconsin	82
3	Vanderbilt	96
7	DePaul	71
2	Iowa	72

Regional semifinals March 23
1	Connecticut	72
12	San Francisco	44
3	Vanderbilt	74
2	Iowa	63

Regional finals March 25
1	Connecticut	67
3	Vanderbilt	57

=== Midwest Region – Nacogdoches, Texas ===
First round March 15 and 16
1	Louisiana Tech	98
16	UCF	41
Ruston, LA – Sat/Mon
8	Utah	66
9	Southern Miss	74
5	Purdue	60
12	Notre Dame	73
Lubbock, TX – Fri/Sun
4	Texas Tech	78
13	Portland	61
6	Oregon State	65
11	Stephen F. Austin	67
Clemson, SC – Sat/Mon
3	Clemson	79
14	Austin Peay	52
7	Oklahoma State	90
10	Rhode Island	82
Athens, GA – Fri/Sun
2	Georgia	98
15	Saint Francis	66

Second round March 17 and 18
1	Louisiana Tech	84
9	Southern Miss	46
12	Notre Dame	67
4	Texas Tech	82
11	Stephen F. Austin	93^{OT}
3	Clemson	88
7	Oklahoma State	55
2	Georgia	83

Regional semifinals March 23
1	Louisiana Tech	66
4	Texas Tech	55
11	Stephen F. Austin	64
2	Georgia	78

Regional finals March 25
1	Louisiana Tech	76
2	Georgia	90

=== West Region – Seattle, Washington ===
First round March 15 and 16
1	Stanford	82
16	Grambling State	43
Stanford, CA – Sat/Mon
8	Colorado State	66
9	Nebraska	62
5	NC State	77
12	Montana	68
Tuscaloosa, AL – Fri/Sun
4	Alabama	95
13	Appalachian State	66
6	Auburn	73
11	Hawaii	53
Boulder, CO – Fri/Sun
3	Colorado	83
14	Tulane	75
7	Texas A&M	68
10	Kent State	72
University Park, PA – Fri/Sun
2	Penn State	94
15	Youngstown State	71

Second round March 17 and 18
1	Stanford	94
8	Colorado State	63
5	NC State	68
4	Alabama	88
6	Auburn	68^{OT}
3	Colorado	61
10	Kent State	59
2	Penn State	86

Regional semifinals March 23
1	Stanford	78^{OT}
4	Alabama	76
6	Auburn	75
2	Penn State	69

Regional finals March 25
1	Stanford	71
6	Auburn	57

=== Final Four – Charlotte, North Carolina ===
National semifinals March 29
E1	Tennessee	88^{OT}
ME1	Connecticut	83
MW2	Georgia	86
W1	Stanford	76

National championship March 31
E1	Tennessee	83
MW2	Georgia	65

== Record by conference ==
Sixteen conferences had more than one bid, or at least one win in NCAA Tournament play:

Conference	# of Bids	Record	Win %	Round of 32	Sweet Sixteen	Elite Eight	Final Four	Championship Game
Southeastern	7	19–6	.760	5	5	4	2	2
Big Ten	6	7–6	.538	5	2	–	–	–
Atlantic Coast	4	6–4	.600	4	1	1	–	–
Big Eight	4	4–4	.500	3	1	–	–	–
Southwest	4	3–4	.429	2	1	–	–	–
Conference USA	4	2–4	.333	2	–	–	–	–
Pacific-10	3	4–3	.571	1	1	1	1	–
Atlantic 10	3	1–3	.250	1	–	–	–	–
Big East	2	5–2	.714	2	1	1	1	–
Colonial	2	2–2	.500	1	1	–	–	–
Mid-American	2	2–2	.500	2	–	–	–	–
West Coast	2	2–2	.500	1	1	–	–	–
Western Athletic	2	1–2	.333	1	–	–	–	–
Ohio Valley	2	0–2	–	–	–	–	–	–
Sun Belt	1	3–1	.750	1	1	1	–	–
Southland	1	2–1	.667	1	1	–	–	–

Fifteen conferences went 0-1: Big Sky Conference, Big South Conference, Big West Conference, Ivy League, MAAC, Mid-Continent, MEAC, Midwestern Collegiate, Missouri Valley Conference, North Atlantic Conference, Northeast Conference, Patriot League, Southern Conference, SWAC, and Trans America

== All-Tournament team ==
- Michelle M. Marciniak, Tennessee
- Chamique Holdsclaw, Tennessee
- Tiffani Johnson, Tennessee
- La'Keshia Frett, Georgia
- Saudia Roundtree, Georgia

== Game officials ==
- Art Bomegen (semifinal)
- Doug Cloud (semifinal)
- Wes Dean (semifinal)
- John Morningstar (semifinal)
- Bob Trammell (semifinal)
- Scott Yarborough (semifinal)
- Sally Bell (final)
- Dee Kantner (final)
- Violet Palmer (final)

This was the first year the NCAA used three officials in tournament games, which was the standard for men's games since the 1978-79 season. Several conferences, including the SEC, assigned three officials to its regular season and conference tournament games for several seasons before the NCAA changed its rules.

== See also ==
- 1996 NCAA Division I men's basketball tournament
- 1996 NCAA Division II women's basketball tournament
- 1996 NCAA Division III women's basketball tournament
- 1996 NAIA Division I women's basketball tournament
- 1996 NAIA Division II women's basketball tournament
