= 1985 National Invitation Tournament =

Annual NCAA college basketball competition

- Season: 1984–85
- Teams: 32
- Finals site: Madison Square Garden, New York City
- Champions: UCLA Bruins (1st title)
- Runner-up: Indiana Hoosiers (2nd title game)
- Semifinalists: Tennessee Volunteers (2nd semifinal); Louisville Cardinals (2nd semifinal)
- Winning coach: Walt Hazzard (1st title)
- MVP: Reggie Miller (UCLA)

The 1985 National Invitation Tournament was the 1985 edition of the annual NCAA college basketball competition. The tournament began on Tuesday, March 12, 1985, and ended when the UCLA Bruins defeated Indiana Hoosiers in the NIT championship game on Friday, March 29, 1985, at Madison Square Garden. The Bruins were led by first-year head coach Walt Hazzard.

== Selected teams ==
Below is a list of the 32 teams selected for the tournament.

- Alcorn State
- Bradley
- Butler
- Canisius
- Chattanooga
- Cincinnati
- Clemson
- Florida
- Fordham
- Fresno State
- Houston
- Indiana
- Kent State
- Lamar
- Louisville
- Marquette
- Missouri
- Montana
- Nebraska
- New Mexico
- Richmond
- Southwestern Louisiana
- Saint Joseph's
- Santa Clara
- South Florida
- Tennessee
- Tennessee Tech
- Texas A&M
- UCLA
- Virginia
- Wake Forest
- West Virginia

== Bracket ==
Below are the four first round brackets, along with the four-team championship bracket.

First Round
Tennessee	65
Tennessee Tech	62
Southwestern Louisiana	65
Florida	64
Virginia	56
West Virginia	55
Saint Joseph's	68
Missouri	67

Second Round
Tennessee	73
Southwestern Louisiana	72
Virginia	68
Saint Joseph's	61

Quarterfinals
Tennessee	61
Virginia	54

First Round
Indiana	79
Butler	57
Richmond	59
Fordham	57
Cincinnati	77
Kent State	61
Marquette	77
Bradley	64

Second Round
Indiana	75
Richmond	53
Cincinnati	54
Marquette	56

Quarterfinals
Indiana	94
Marquette	82

First Round
UCLA	78
Montana	47
Nebraska	79
Canisius	66
Fresno State	79
Santa Clara	76
New Mexico	80
Texas A&M	67

Second Round
UCLA	82
Nebraska	63
Fresno State	66
New Mexico	55

Quarterfinals
UCLA	53
Fresno State	43

First Round
Louisville	77
Alcorn State	75
South Florida	77
Wake Forest	66
Lamar	78
Houston	71
Chattanooga	67
Clemson	65

Second Round
Louisville	68
South Florida	61
Lamar	84
Chattanooga	85

Quarterfinals
Louisville	71
Chattanooga	66

=== Semifinals & finals ===
Semifinals (March 27)
Tennessee	67
Indiana	74
UCLA	75
Louisville	66

Finals (March 29)
Indiana	62
UCLA	65

Third place game
Tennessee	100
Louisville	84

== All-tournament team ==
- Nigel Miguel, UCLA
- Steve Alford, Indiana
- Uwe Blab, Indiana
- Anthony Richardson, Tennessee
- Billy Thompson, Louisville

== See also ==
- 1985 National Women's Invitational Tournament
- 1985 NCAA Division I men's basketball tournament
- 1985 NCAA Division II men's basketball tournament
- 1985 NCAA Division III men's basketball tournament
- 1985 NCAA Division I women's basketball tournament
- 1985 NCAA Division II women's basketball tournament
- 1985 NCAA Division III women's basketball tournament
- 1985 NAIA men's basketball tournament
- 1985 NAIA women's basketball tournament
