= Torrey Ward =

American basketball player and coach (1978–2015)

Biographical details
- Born: July 7, 1978; Birmingham, Alabama
- Died: April 7, 2015 (aged 36); Bloomington, Illinois

Playing career
- 1997–2000: UAB Blazers
- 2002: Shandong Da Ben
- Position: Guard

Coaching career (HC unless noted)
- 2003–2004: Jacksonville State (volunteer)
- 2004–2006: Jacksonville State (asst.)
- 2006–2011: Ole Miss (asst.)
- 2012–2014: Illinois State (asst.)
- 2014–2015: Illinois State (assoc. HC)

Torrey Ward (July 7, 1978 – April 7, 2015) was an American assistant coach of men's college basketball. An undrafted 6 ft 3 in (1.91 m) guard from the University of Alabama-Birmingham, Ward played professionally in China for several years before starting his coaching career as a volunteer at Jacksonville State University in 2003. Ward became an assistant at JSU before being hired to Andy Kennedy's staff at Ole Miss. After five seasons with the Rebels, Ward spent two years as an assistant to Dan Muller at Illinois State University. Prior to the 2014–15 season, Muller promoted Ward to associate head coach.

While returning from the 2015 NCAA championship game in Indianapolis, Ward was one of seven people killed in a plane crash just outside Illinois State's main campus.

== Playing career ==
Ward attended University of Alabama at Birmingham, his hometown school, and played for three seasons (1997–2000) under head coach Murry Bartow. He was not drafted into the NBA.

== Coaching career ==
In 2003, Ward joined Mike LaPlante's staff as a volunteer coach at Jacksonville State University. He then spent the next two seasons as an assistant coach for the Gamecocks before getting hired by Andy Kennedy at the University of Mississippi. After five seasons with the Rebels, Ward moved onto Illinois State University in Normal, Illinois. Ward spent two seasons as an assistant before being promoted to associate head coach in May 2014.

== Death ==
Ward was killed in a plane crash on April 7, 2015. He was a passenger in a Cessna 414 flying back to Illinois State when the aircraft crashed overnight just two miles east of Central Illinois Regional Airport in Bloomington, Illinois. Also among the seven passengers killed in the crash was ISU deputy athletic director Aaron Leetch. The plane was flying from Indianapolis, Indiana, where Ward had attended the 2015 National Championship Game at Lucas Oil Stadium. Ward was survived by his two children.
