= List of Jacksonville State Gamecocks men's basketball head coaches =

The following is a list of Jacksonville State Gamecocks men's basketball head coaches. There have been 11 head coaches of the Dolphins in their 94-season history.

Jacksonville State's current head coach is Ray Harper. He was hired as the Gamecocks' head coach in April 2016, replacing James Green, departed after the 2015–16 season.

No.	Tenure	Coach	Years	Record	Pct.
1	1925–1927	C. C. Bush	2	12–14	.462
2	1927–1928	Al Clemens	1	4–4	.500
3	1928–1951 (Note: The records for six seasons of Stephenson's tenure are incomplete.) (Note: Jacksonville State did not field a team from 1941 to 1945 due to World War II.)	J. W. Stephenson	19	225–47	.827
4	1951–1953	Ray Wedgeworth	2	32–14	.696
5	1953–1971	Tom Roberson	18	247–160	.607
6	1971–1974	Mitchell Caldwell	3	38–38	.500
7	1974–1998	Bill Jones	24	449–210	.681
8	1998–2000	Mark Turgeon	2	25–29	.463
9	2000–2008	Mike LaPlante	8	95–137	.409
10	2008–2016	James Green	8	89–153	.368
11	2016–present	Ray Harper	7	132–94	.584
Totals		11 coaches	94 seasons	1,348–900	.600
Records updated through end of 2022–23 season Source
