= History of Le Moyne Dolphins men's basketball (1983–1988) =

NCAA Division I men's basketball team representing Le Moyne College

The history of Le Moyne Dolphins men's basketball from 1983 to 1988 includes the first five years of the head coaching reign of John Beilein. The Dolphins joined the Mideast Collegiate Conference (MECC) in Beilein's first season and went undefeated in league play to win the conference regular-season championship. However, Le Moyne failed to win the MECC tournament and were not selected for an at-large bid to the 1984 NCAA tournament. The 1983–84 season marked the first time in program history that Le Moyne won 20 games. Scott Hicks and Pete Jerebko, both of whom would become Le Moyne Hall of Famers, arrived as freshmen in 1984. Despite a solid 19-win campaign in 1984–85, the Dolphins failed to earn an at-large berth to the tournament. After a losing season marred by injuries, illness and suspensions, Le Moyne bounced back with their second 20-win season in 1986–87. However, after falling in the MECC tournament, Le Moyne was not selected for an at-large bid to the 1987 NCAA tournament. Len Rauch, who would go on to finish his college career as Le Moyne's all-time leading scorer and rebounder, arrived for his freshman season in 1987. Hicks, Jerebko and Rauch led the Dolphins to the regular-season co-championship of the MECC, the conference tournament title and a berth in the 1988 NCAA tournament. Le Moyne finished with a program-best 24–6 record in 1987–88, and that season's team was later enshrined in the Le Moyne College Athletic Hall of Fame.

== Conference title and 20 wins in Beilein's debut (1983–1984) ==
After a month-long search, Le Moyne hired John Beilein as the Dolphins' new head coach to replace Mike Lee. Beilein had been the head coach at Division III Nazareth the previous season and posted a 20–6 record. Prior to his one year at Nazareth, Beilein had coached Erie Community College for four years. Beilein was the nephew of Le Moyne athletic director Tommy Niland, who insisted that his candidacy for the job had been judged independently. Beilein was also known to Le Moyne president Rev. Frank R. Haig, S.J., who was president of Wheeling College while Beilein was a student there. Le Moyne received about 50 applications for the job and conducted interviews with seven candidates. Beilein's initial contract term was three years.

The Dolphins became one of six charter members of the MECC in 1983, and remained a member of that conference, until it dissolved in 1991. The league did not play a full round-robin schedule during its inaugural season, but there were plans to do so starting with the 1984–85 campaign. The MECC staged postseason championship tournaments, but the winner did not receive an automatic bid to the NCAA tournament until 1986. The MECC's other five charter members were Adelphi, Gannon, Philadelphia Textile, Saint Michael's and St. John Fisher. Le Moyne athletic director Tommy Niland was the MECC's first president.

At the time John Beilein was hired as head coach, the Dolphins had three verbal commitments from recruits, Jim Walser, Bill Smolinski and James Henderson, and Beilein wanted to bring all of them into the program. All three players ultimately enrolled at Le Moyne.

Dolphins assistant coach Bob Kawa left Le Moyne to become the head coach at Onondaga Community College. The Dolphins hired Tony Smarrelli and Mike Cordovano as new assistant coaches. Smarrelli had been head coach at Nottingham High School, where his teams made deep runs in the state tournament in each of his four seasons, winning once. Cordovano was 21–4 the previous season as head coach at Bishop Turner High School.

Preseason practices for the 1983–84 season started on October 15, 1983. The Dolphins lost co-captains Joe Nowak and John Miranda to graduation. Seniors Paul Galvin, Mark Prechtl, Jimmy Bova and Mike Leithead, juniors Bobby Chestnut and Wright Lassiter and sophomores Brent Loggins, Erick Piscopo and Terry Heller all returned. Junior Don Murcko was not sufficiently recovered from a knee injury he suffered in a January 1983 car accident and missed the entire season. Four freshmen were added to the team. James Henderson, 6'7", from Linton High School was expected to be the starting center. Bill Smolinski from Solvay High School became the team's tallest player at 6'10". Jim Walser was a 6'3" swingman who played at nearby Bishop Ludden. Walter Hill was a quick 5'10" guard from Gonzaga in Washington, D.C. Galvin, Leithead and Lassiter were named tri-captains.

In John Beilein's debut as Le Moyne's head coach, the Dolphins overcame a first-half deficit and won at Oswego State, 76–58, on November 18. Bobby Chestnut scored 17 points to lead the Dolphins. Freshman James Henderson scored 10 points, grabbed a team-high six rebounds and blocked three shots.

After a road win at Cortland State, the Dolphins were beaten by Assumption, 76–57, in the opening game of the New Hampshire College Basketball Tournament on November 27. James Henderson scored a game-high 18 points for Le Moyne. The Dolphins defeated Plymouth State in the third-place game the following evening. Henderson scored 25 points to lead Le Moyne. Wright Lassiter and freshman Jim Walser had eight rebounds each. Lassiter added 10 points, and Walser scored seven. The Dolphins improved to 3–1 on the season.

After the score was tied at halftime, the Dolphins pulled away from Ithaca in their December 1 home opener, beating the Bombers, 69–50. Bobby Chestnut, James Henderson and Paul Galvin each scored 12 points to lead Le Moyne. After Ithaca guard Tony Jackson scored 14 first-half points, Chestnut defended him in the second half, holding him to only four markers. Henderson and Wright Lassiter each had five rebounds, and Paul Galvin dished out 10 assists. The Dolphins improved their record to 4–1.

Le Moyne hosted the Matt's Premium Classic in January 1984, the first in-season tournament played at the Henninger Athletic Center since the 1975 Le Moyne Christmas Invitational. The Dolphins entered their opening round game 6–2, having not played for a month due to exam and semester breaks. With Wright Lassiter on the bench with four fouls in the second half, Le Moyne went on a 10–2 run, keyed by two transition baskets by Erick Piscopo, that gave them a 12-point lead. The Dolphins went on to defeat Concordia (NY), 78–61. Bobby Chestnut and James Henderson each scored 16 points to lead Le Moyne. Henderson shot 8-for-9 from the floor while Chestnut was good on four of five attempts. Despite his foul trouble, Lassiter grabbed a game-high 11 rebounds and added eight points. Paul Galvin had a double-double with 10 points and 10 assists. Piscopo finished with six points.

The following evening, Mansfield won the tournament title, beating Le Moyne, 85–58. Wright Lassiter had a double-double for the Dolphins with 13 points and 10 rebounds. James Henderson also scored 13 points for Le Moyne. Henderson and Bobby Chestnut were named to the all-tournament team. The loss dropped the Dolphins to 7–3.

The Dolphins hosted Gannon in their first MECC game on January 28, and Jimmy Bova scored 20 points, shooting 8 for 15 from the floor, to lead them to a 55–50 wire-to-wire victory. Le Moyne built double-digit leads in each half and allowed them to shrink to three points. However, the Dolphins responded with Bova's outside shooting and the strong inside game of James Henderson and Wright Lassiter, who finished with 12 and 11 points, respectively. Le Moyne improved to 11–5 with the win.

The Dolphins established themselves as contenders for an NCAA tournament berth with a 72–70 home victory over Philadelphia Textile, ranked no. 12 in Division II, on February 4. Le Moyne used an aggressive interior defense, getting seven blocked shots from James Henderson, Bill Smolinski and Wright Lassiter, to build a 13-point lead with 10 minutes to play. However, fouls began to mount. Henderson fouled out with 4:27 on the clock. Lassiter drew his fourth foul with two and a half minutes to play. Philadelphia Textile took advantage, hitting 23 of 24 second-half free throws and pressing on the defensive end to get back into the game. Free throws in the final minute by Paul Galvin and Lassiter kept the Dolphins from falling behind, but Philadelphia Textile tied the game at 70 with 24 seconds to go. Jimmy Bova's 15-foot jump shot with three seconds left put Le Moyne back into the lead and secured the victory. The Dolphins' fifth straight win improved their record to 14–5 overall and 3–0 in MECC play.

The Dolphins completed a perfect 5–0 MECC season, winning their regular-season finale, 64–55, at home over Saint Michael's on February 25. The Purple Knights made a late charge, cutting Le Moyne's 15-point lead to six with less than three minutes to play. However, senior Paul Galvin, who appeared distracted much of the night, after learning his parents had been in a car accident, hit four clutch free throws that iced the game. Galvin finished with 10 points. Senior Jimmy Bova, playing his final collegiate home game, shot 4 for 12 from the floor and finished with eight points. Wright Lassiter scored 14 points to lead the Dolphins, who improved to 19–7 overall and kept their hopes for an at-large bid to the NCAA tournament alive. Although the MECC tournament winner was not entitled to an automatic bid, it was widely thought that at least one MECC team would likely receive an invitation.

The top-seeded Dolphins led their March 2 MECC semifinal game against Adelphi at the Hammermill Center by eight points at halftime but allowed their lead to slip away, falling behind on a three-point play by Steve Pollack, who finished with a game-high 24 points, with 50 seconds to play. The Panthers held on for a 58–57 victory, likely extinguishing Le Moyne's NCAA tournament hopes. Paul Galvin scored 22 points to lead the Dolphins, and Jimmy Bova finished with 17.

The Dolphins met Philadelphia Textile, ranked no. 16 in Division II, the following evening, one day before the final at-large selections for the NCAA tournament were to be announced. With the score tied at 38 midway through the second half, the Dolphins seized control, closing the game on a 36–22 run over the final 9:56, to claim third-place in the MECC tournament with a 74–60 victory. James Henderson scored 23 points to lead the Dolphins, and Bobby Chestnut finished with 20.

Despite the win over a ranked opponent in their final game, the Dolphins were not selected for the 1984 NCAA tournament. However, their 20–7 overall mark set a new program record for wins in a season, and they were the inaugural MECC regular-season champions with an undefeated 5–0 record.

== Hicks and Jerebko arrive (1984–1985) ==
Preseason practices for the 1984–85 season began on October 15, 1984. Paul Galvin, Jimmy Bova, Mark Leithead and Mark Prechtl were all lost to graduation. Seniors Bobby Chestnut and Wright Lassiter, juniors Erick Piscopo and Terry Heller and sophomores James Henderson, Bill Smolinski, Walter Hill and Jim Walser all returned. Senior Don Murcko, who had not played in 22 months since suffering a serious knee injury in a car accident, was back with the team. Immediately after the accident, doctors had expected Murcko, the team's leading scorer at the time, would never play basketball again. Although Murcko was back with the team, his injuries substantially reduced his mobility and leaping ability. Head coach John Beilein signed the top two freshman recruits on his wish list. Scott Hicks, a 6'4" swingman, averaged 20 points per game over his final two seasons at Vernon-Verona-Sherrill High School and was the Tri-Valley League most valuable player as a senior. Pete Jerebko, a 6'5" swingman, averaged 27 points and 11 rebounds per game as a senior at Depew High School. The Dolphins also added freshman walk-ons Dan Morley, a 6'3" guard, T.J. Purcell, a 6'1" guard, and Mike Palazzo. Le Moyne had planned to add junior transfer Brian Betelak, who averaged 28 points and 14 rebounds per game the previous season at Onondaga Community College. However, Betelak was one English credit short of graduating and ineligible to play under NCAA rules. Betelak planned to earn the needed credit and hoped to enroll at Le Moyne in the fall of 1985, and play for the Dolphins as a senior. Chestnut and Lassiter were named co-captains.

Le Moyne opened their season on November 16, at the Keene State Classic, defeating Mercy, 82–69. Four Dolphins scored in double figures, led by Wright Lassiter, who had 18 points. The following evening, James Henderson scored 17 points and was named the tournament's most valuable player, leading Le Moyne to a 50–42 victory over West Chester in the tournament final.

After starting the season 6–0, the Dolphins suffered a 62–52 loss at Seton Hall on December 8. Although Le Moyne outrebounded the Pirates, 35–28, the Dolphins were doomed by their 31 turnovers and lack of a balanced scoring attack. James Henderson scored a game-high 22 points for Le Moyne, but Pete Jerebko was limited to eight points, Wright Lassiter scored seven points and Bobby Chestnut managed only five, all three players held below their averages. This was the Dolphins' 15th consecutive loss against a Division I opponent.

In their opening game of the Matt's Premium Classic on January 4, 1985, the Dolphins trailed Queens by seven points with 11 minutes remaining, when Erick Piscopo came off the bench to run the point. The work of Piscopo, including two steals, and Wright Lassiter, with a blocked shot, on the defensive end sparked a 12–2 run that put Le Moyne ahead. Lassiter scored off a lob pass from Piscopo to tie the game. The Dolphins then surged into the lead on the next Queens possession, after Piscopo stole the ball and took it the length of the floor for a basket and converted a free throw for a three-point play. Le Moyne controlled the remainder of the game, earning a 56–50 victory. Bobby Chestnut scored 16 points to lead the Dolphins. Lassiter had 11 points and team-high seven rebounds. Piscopo finished with nine points and three assists; the fast-break basket that gave Le Moyne the lead was his only field goal of the game.

The following evening, the Dolphins closed the first half against Clarion on a 9–2 run to tie the score at 30 at intermission and survived a challenge after the break to win their tournament with a 65–55 victory. Le Moyne trailed, 50–45, with nine minutes to play in the second half, when Wright Lassiter scored all 12 points in a 12–0 run that put the Dolphins back in control of the game. Lassiter's 22 points and solid interior defense earned him the tournament's most valuable player award. Bobby Chestnut scored 14 points in the final and joined Lassiter on the all-tournament team. Le Moyne improved to 8–2 on the season.

The Dolphins battled back from a 12-point deficit with 10 minutes to play and from seven points down in the final minute to send their January 11 home game against Philadelphia Textile to overtime on a jump shot by Pete Jerebko with two seconds to play. Wright Lassiter fouled out with 3:33 to play in the second overtime, and the Rams seized control of the game from there, defeating Le Moyne, 78–75. Philadelphia Textile attempted 49 free throws, making 38 of them, while Le Moyne was only 7 for 8 from the line. The smaller Rams outrebounded the Dolphins, 42–29. Le Moyne made 34 field goals, while Philadelphia Textile had only 20. Lassiter had a double-double with 17 points and 11 rebounds for the Dolphins and passed the 1,000 career points mark. Bobby Chestnut also scored 17 points. Jerebko finished with eight points for Le Moyne, who fell to 9–3 overall and 2–2 in MECC play.

The Dolphins were leading their January 26 game at Adelphi, 46–45, with 10 minutes to play, when a Panthers player inbounded the ball off James Henderson's groin. A bench-clearing melee ensued resulting in the ejection of Adelphi's Jeff Fisher and Le Moyne's Walter Hill. A series of technical free throws resulted in the Dolphins holding a 50–47 lead. Le Moyne's offense sputtered after losing their starting point guard, and Adelphi defeated the Dolphins, 68–60. Bobby Chestnut scored a game-high 19 points for Le Moyne, which entered the game having won four straight and seven of their previous eight games but dropped to 13–4 overall and 2–3 in MECC play, tied with Adelphi for fourth place in the league.

The following afternoon, Bobby Chestnut scored 10 points to surpass 1,000 points for his career, but the Dolphins lost at C.W. Post, 74–62. Wright Lassiter scored 15 points to lead Le Moyne.

In a game between teams tied for third place in the MECC and crucial for the Dolphins' NCAA tournament hopes, Le Moyne was down by 12 points with 15 minutes to play at St. John Fisher on February 13. The Dolphins battled back and tied the game on Bobby Chestnut's 17-foot jump shot with 17 seconds remaining. After falling behind again, Wright Lassiter's bank shot in the closing seconds of overtime rescued Le Moyne and sent the game to a second extra session. However, with Le Moyne protecting a one-point lead, Gurnal Jones hot both ends of a one-and-one with 10 seconds remaining, and the Cardinals defeated the Dolphins, 69–68, in double overtime. Lassiter scored 17 points to lead Le Moyne, which fell to 15–8 overall and 4–5 in MECC play.

After being left out of the starting lineup for being 10 minutes late and playing only three and a half minutes, senior co-captain Bobby Chestnut walked out of the Henninger Athletic Center after a halftime argument with head coach John Beilein on February 20. The Dolphins got 19 points and five assists from freshman Scott Hicks and defeated St. Lawrence, 82–72. James Henderson scored 15 points and grabbed nine rebounds for Le Moyne, which improved to 16–9 on the season. Chestnut did not attend practice the following day. He returned to the team two days after the incident after a discussion with Beilein.

The Dolphins finished the regular season with a 4–6 record in MECC play, tied for fourth place, and were the no. 4 seed in the conference tournament, winning the tiebreaker because of a superior overall record. Le Moyne hosted Adelphi in the MECC quarterfinals on February 26. Led by their senior co-captains, Wright Lassiter and Bobby Chestnut, playing their final collegiate home game, the Dolphins raced out to an early lead and cruised to an 85–69 victory. Lassiter scored 18 points and grabbed 10 rebounds. Chestnut had 12 points and dished out six assists. Sophomore James Henderson had a double-double with 17 points and 11 rebounds. Senior Don Murcko played four minutes, scoring one point, and left the court to a standing ovation.

Le Moyne met Philadelphia Textile, ranked no. 17 in Division II, in the MECC semifinals on March 1, at the Hammermill Center in Erie, Pennsylvania. The Dolphins got off to a hot start and built an eight-point lead in the first half but were plagued by turnovers and trailed by two points at intermission. The Rams surged ahead and led by 14 points with less than nine minutes to play, before a furious Le Moyne comeback got them within two points with 1:51 remaining. Philadelphia Textile ran down the clock from there until the Dolphins fouled with eight seconds to play. Both free throws were good, extending the lead to four points, and Le Moyne fell, 65–62. Freshman Scott Hicks scored 18 points to lead the Dolphins. Wright Lassiter finished with only six points on 2-for-14 shooting from the floor. James Henderson spent much of the game in foul trouble and managed only two points and two rebounds, fouling out with 11:45 to play. Bobby Chestnut scored 16 points for Le Moyne.

The Dolphins ended their season with an 89–88 victory over St. John Fisher in the third-place game of the MECC tournament on March 2. Bobby Chestnut scored 26 points in his final collegiate game. Fellow senior co-captain Wright Lassiter added 22. Le Moyne had an 11-point halftime lead, but 12 second-half turnovers allowed the Cardinals to get back into the game. The Dolphins led, 87–86, with three seconds remaining, when Chestnut hit a pair of free throws to ice the game. After starting the season 13–3, Le Moyne lost seen of their final 13 games to finish 19–10.

Wright Lassiter and Bobby Chestnut were named second-team All-MECC for the 1984–85 season. Lassiter was the league's leading rebounder at 9.7 per game. Pete Jerebko was named the MECC's all-freshmen team. He was second in the conference in field-goal percentage at 61.9%, trailing teammate James Henderson, who hit at a 62.1% clip.

== Injury, illness, inconsistency and a losing season (1985–1986) ==
Preseason practices for the 1985–86 campaign started on October 15, 1985, and included an open tryout. Head coach John Beilein was partial to walk-ons, because he had been one himself as a freshman at Wheeling. By his senior season, he was team captain. Le Moyne lost co-captains Wright Lassiter and Bobby Chestnut, both of whom were 1,000-point scorers, to graduation in 1985. Don Murcko, whose academic progress was slowed by a January 1983 car accident, remained enrolled at Le Moyne but no longer played basketball. Seniors Erick Piscopo and Terry Heller, juniors James Henderson, Bill Smolinski and Walter Hill and sophomores Scott Hicks, Pete Jerebko, Dan Morley and T.J. Purcell all returned. Transfer senior Brian Betelak, a 6'6" forward, graduated from Onondaga Community College, and satisfied the NCAA rules for junior college transfers. The Dolphins added three freshman recruits. David Niland, a 5'10" guard who was Beilein's cousin and nephew of Le Moyne athletic director Tommy Niland, scored over 1,000 points and averaged seven assists per game during his career at Williamsville South High School. Phil Allen, a 6'6" forward, planned to join former Bishop Ludden teammate Jim Walser with the Dolphins, but Walser did not make the preseason cut. Allen averaged 16 points and seven rebounds per game as a high school senior. Steve Lauer, a 6'6" forward, averaged 19 points and 15 rebounds per game as a senior at John S. Burke Catholic High School. Freshman Mark Young, a 6'3" forward, made the team as a walk-on.

The Dolphins opened their season with an 85–84 victory over host Mansfield in the First Citizens Classic on November 22. James Henderson's layup with one second remaining provided the winning margin, as Le Moyne erased a seven-point deficit with 1:12 to play. Henderson finished with 21 points and a team-high eight rebounds. Pete Jerebko scored 22 points to lead Le Moyne. The following evening, the Dolphins lost the tournament final to Sacred Heart, 100–66. James Henderson scored 16 points to lead Le Moyne.

In a game that doubled as a MECC contest and an opening round tilt of the Le Moyne–Matt's Premium Classic, the Dolphins dominated Pace, 83–48, on December 13. Pete Jerebko scored 21 points to lead Le Moyne. The Dolphins defeated Slippery Rock in the tournament final, 74–67, to take the title. Le Moyne improved to 6–2 on the season with their fourth straight win.

The pain in James Henderson's left leg forced him to leave the Dolphins' January 11, 1986 game at Philadelphia Textile. Brian Betelak responded with a double-double, scoring 14 points and grabbing 13 rebounds. Terry Heller's basket with 12 seconds to play gave Le Moyne a 60–58 victory. The Dolphins improved to 7–3 overall and 2–1 in MECC play. After the game, it was learned that Henderson had a stress fracture in his leg and would be out of the lineup for at least a month.

Starting point guard Walter Hill was stricken with mononucleosis before the Dolphins' January 25 game at Adelphi. His 10-foot buzzer-beater had sent Le Moyne's previous game at Hamilton to overtime, where the Dolphins succumbed, 73–63. It was Le Moyne's first loss to a Division III team since February 1983, after 20 straight wins. Playing without Hill and the injured James Henderson, the Dolphins lost their next two games on the road by four points each at Adelphi and Quinnipiac and fell to 9–7 overall and 2–3 in MECC play. Pete Jerebko scored 25 points against Quinnipiac for Le Moyne.

The Dolphins ended their three-game losing streak with an unexpected home victory over Gannon, ranked no. 4 in Division II, on January 29. Senior Erick Piscopo scored 18 points, 14 in the second half, on 8-for-8 shooting from the floor, stepping in for freshman David Niland, who was running the point in place of the ill Walter Hill, after Niland was ejected. With 5:17 to play in the first half, Niland shoved a Gannon player. Gannon's David Morris ran toward Niland, but Le Moyne's Bill Smolinski intercepted him and grabbed him by the throat. Morris then punched Smolinski, and the two were separated. After five minutes of pushing and shoving, Niland and Morris were ejected. Following the final buzzer of the Dolphins' 90–86 victory, Smolinski punched Morris near the Gannon bench, and another melee ensued, lasting several minutes and stretching from the visitors' bench to the locker room entrance. Pete Jerebko had a double-double for the Dolphins with 17 points and 13 rebounds and also added nine assists and three blocked shots. The Dolphins improved to 10–7 overall and 3–3 in MECC play. Le Moyne later suspended Smolinski for one game for his actions.

James Henderson surpassed the 1,000 career points mark in the Dolphins' 89–65 loss at Mercyhurst on February 14.

The Dolphins lost their fourth straight game and fell below .500 for the first time during the head coaching tenure of Jon Beilein after a 77–72 overtime loss at St. Lawrence on February 18. Le Moyne led by six points with less than two minutes remaining in regulation but missed the front ends of two one-and-ones, allowing the Saints back into the game. Pete Jerebko scored a game-high 22 points for the Dolphins, who fell to 12–13 on the season. The loss was Le Moyne's third of the season against a Division III opponent.

After ending the regular season with an 80–68 home victory over Union, the Dolphins entered the 1986 MECC tournament in Erie, Pennsylvania 13–13 overall and 4–6 in league play, having finished fourth in the conference. Le Moyne defeated Pace, 69–68, in overtime in their quarterfinal game on February 27. The Dolphins had a two-point lead late in regulation, but Erick Piscopo missed a pair of free throws with 33 seconds to play, and the Setters tied the game with 21 seconds on the clock. Pete Jerebko missed a 25-foot jump shot at the buzzer. In overtime, Pace led by three points with 1:12 on the clock. Scott Hicks hit a 20-foot jump shot with 40 seconds to play, and the Dolphins fouled. James Henderson rebounded the miss of the front end of the one-and-one, and Hicks found Walter Hill for a jump shot from the top of the key with one second to play that gave Le Moyne the victory. Jerebko had 20 points and seven rebounds, and Henderson had 15 points and seven boards for the Dolphins.

The following evening, the Dolphins met top-seeded Gannon, ranked no. 12 in Division II, on the Golden Knights' home floor in the semifinals. Gannon's strong play inside forced Le Moyne to shoot from the perimeter, and the Dolphins were outrebounded, 47–34. Pete Jerebko and James Henderson teamed up for 15 first-half points before the Golden Knights' defense tightened. Brian Betelak scored 12 second-half points, but Gannon's eight-point halftime lead swelled, and they defeated the Dolphins, 84–66. Jerebko finished with 16 points to lead Le Moyne.

The Dolphins squandered an eight-point halftime lead in the MECC third-place game and fell to Saint Michael's, 68–66, finishing the season 14–15. Pete Jerebko and Walter Hill were named 1986 second-team MECC All-Stars.

== Another 20-win season but no tournament bid (1986–1987) ==
Preseason practices for the 1986–87 campaign began on October 15, 1986. The players had been engaged in a weight training and running program since September 8. The Dolphins lost leading rebounder Brian Betelak, Terry Heller and Erick Piscopo to graduation in 1986. Seniors James Henderson, Walter Hill and Bill Smolinski, juniors Pete Jerebko and Scott Hicks and sophomores Phil Allen, Steve Lauer and David Niland all returned. Le Moyne recruited three freshmen: Russell Barnes, a 6'0" point guard, Paul Rooney, a 6'3" guard, and Dan Carrow, a 6'7" forward. All-New York State guard Julius Edwards from Corcoran High School also enrolled at Le Moyne as a freshman, but he redshirted to focus on his academics. Also new to the team were Michael Johnston and 6'3" freshman walk-on Jim Cunningham. Assistant coach Tony Smarrelli left Le Moyne to become the head coach at Bishop Grimes High School. He was replaced by James Sigona, who had served as an assistant the previous season at Division III national champion Potsdam State.

The Dolphins opened their season on November 21, at the Edinboro Walker Brothers Classic with a 73–52 victory over Saginaw Valley State. The three-point field goal was added to college basketball this season, and Pete Jerebko had three of them, the only triples Le Moyne scored in the opener. Jerebko finished with 16 points and a team-high 11 rebounds. The Dolphins began to pull away from the Cardinals midway through the first half and led by eight points at intermission. Their lead grew as large as 24 points in the second half. James Henderson scored 21 points to lead Le Moyne and, his legs appeared healthy after being slowed by both tendonitis and a stress fracture during the previous season. The following evening, the Dolphins led Edinboro, 52–47, with 6:08 to play, when the Fighting Scots went on an 8–0 run to pull ahead. Le Moyne recovered, and, with the game tied in the closing seconds, Jose Davis hit an 18-footer at the buzzer to give Edinboro a 67–65 win and the tournament title. Henderson had 20 points and 14 rebounds for the Dolphins.

The Dolphins hosted Bloomfield in the opening round of the Le Moyne–Coca-Cola Classic on December 12. Le Moyne seized control of the game early and cruised to a 78–56 victory. Scott Hicks scored a game-high 19 points off the bench to lead the Dolphins. The following evening, the Dolphins erased a 10-point second-half lead against Mount St. Mary's and took a one-point lead on Scott Hicks's jump shot with 16 seconds to play. However, James Henderson was called for goaltending on a shot by tournament most valuable player Paul Edwards. After Pete Jerebko's shot bounded off the rim at the buzzer, the Mountaineers had a 75–74 victory and the tournament title. Hicks and Henderson, who scored 25 points for the Dolphins in the final, were named to the all-tournament team. Le Moyne dropped to 4–4 on the season.

Head coach John Beilein suspended backup center Bill Smolinski indefinitely on December 26, for off-court conduct that violated team training rules. Beilein would not specifically describe the conduct and said the suspension would definitely not last the remainder of the season. The suspension lasted for two games.

The Dolphins defeated Bowdoin, 81–75, in the opener of the Bentley College Holiday Festival on December 28. Walter Hill canned both ends of a one-and-one with 25 seconds to play to put the game away. James Henderson scored 21 points and grabbed six rebounds to lead Le Moyne. The following evening, Scott Hicks scored 21 points and pulled down eight boards to lead the Dolphins to an 83–79 victory over host Bentley in the tournament final. James Henderson scored 14 points and grabbed seven rebounds in the final and was named tournament most valuable player. Walter Hill had 13 points and six assists, joining Henderson on the all-tournament team. Le Moyne improved to 6–4 on the season.

Scott Hicks had 22 points and five steals and hit four key free throws in the final 23 seconds to lead the Dolphins to an 81–77 home victory over Philadelphia Textile on January 28, 1987. The Dolphins led by as many as 10 points in the second half but allowed the lead to slip away, falling behind, 75–74, with 2:23 to play. Russell Barnes hit a free throw with 2:15 left to tie the game, but his second attempt missed. A minute later, a fast-break layup by Barnes put Le Moyne back in front with 52 seconds remaining. The Dolphins rebounded missed shots on the next two Rams' possessions, and Hicks was fouled each time. Although Le Moyne shot poorly (16 for 27) from the charity stripe, Hicks hit both ends of one-and-ones on his two final opportunities to ice the game. James Henderson had 19 points and five rebounds for the Dolphins, and Pete Jerebko scored 13 points and grabbed a game-high nine boards. The win was the seventh straight for Le Moyne, which improved to 14–5 overall and 4–1 in MECC play.

In a battle for first place in the MECC, the regular-season champion of which earned the right to host the conference tournament, the Dolphins fell, 79–65, at Gannon, ranked no. 11 in Division II, on January 31. Le Moyne was outrebounded, 47–30, and shot only 4 for 11 from the free-throw line. Walter Hill scored 14 points to lead the Dolphins.

Pete Jerebko scored 14 points and became the 20th player in program history with 1,000 career points in the Dolphins' 97–82 loss at St. Michael's on February 7. Scott Hicks led Le Moyne with 17 points. The Dolphins fell to 15–7 overall and 4–3 in MECC play, dropping to fourth place in the league.

The Dolphins moved into second place in the MECC, which would give them a bye in the conference tournament quarterfinals, with an 81–78 win at Philadelphia Textile on February 18. Walter Hill scored 27 points and shot 7 for 8 from three-point range to lead Le Moyne. The Dolphins built a comfortable second-half lead but had to hold off a late comeback by the Rams to secure the victory. Scott Hicks, who finished with 16 points, hot a pair of free throws with 13 seconds to play to put the game away. James Henderson had a double-double for Le Moyne with 19 points and 10 rebounds. The win was the fourth straight for the Dolphins and the 12th in their previous 14 games, improving their record to 19–7 overall and 6–3 in MECC play.

The Dolphins missed an opportunity to clinch the no. 2 seed in the MECC tournament in their regular-season finale, when they lost at home, 65–63, to Gannon, ranked no. 7 in Division II. Le Moyne trailed by eight points with 6:33 remaining and used an 11–3 run to tie the score. John Bowen scored after grabbing an offensive rebound, the second of the possession for Gannon, to give the Golden Knights a 64–62 lead with 20 seconds to play. James Henderson was the fouled; his missed the first shot and made the second with three seconds on the clock. Gannon hit another free throw with two seconds remaining, and the Dolphins were unable to get off a shot at the buzzer. Henderson and Pete Jerebko each had a double-double for Le Moyne. Henderson scored 19 points and grabbed 13 rebounds. Jerebko finished with 14 points and 10 boards. The following day, Saint Michael's won, 64–61, at Adelphi to tie the Dolphins for second place with a 6–4 league record. Saint Michael's won the tiebreaker for the no. 2 seed, because they split the two games with Le Moyne, both teams were swept by first-place Gannon, and Saint Michael's was 2–0 versus fourth-place Pace, while the Dolphins split their games with the Setters.

The Dolphins met last-place Adelphi in the MECC quarterfinals at the Hammermill Center in Erie, Pennsylvania on February 26. Adelphi's program was mired in a recruiting scandal that broke 10 days earlier, resulting in the indefinite suspension of their head coach and assistant and their starting point guard. Le Moyne got double-doubles from both Pete Jerebko and James Henderson and defeated the Panthers, 68–62. Henderson scored a game-high 16 points and collected 11 rebounds. Jerebko finished with 15 points, all coming on five three-point field goals, and grabbed a game-high 12 caroms. Sophomore reserve Steve Lauer played a key role, coming off the bench in the first half for Scott Hicks, who was in foul trouble and scoring seven points. Hicks returned to the floor in the second half and finished with 12 points. The victory improved the Dolphins to 20–8 on the season, matching the highest win total in program history.

After leading for most of the first half, the Dolphins surrendered a 13–2 run to Saint Michael's and trailed by eight points at intermission in their MECC semifinal game. Le Moyne shot only 33% from the floor for the game and fell, 64–50, likely ending their hopes for an NCAA tournament berth. James Henderson scored 11 points and grabbed a game-high 12 rebounds for the Dolphins. Walter Hill scored 15 points to lead Le Moyne, but he shot only 6 for 15 from the field.

The Dolphins' season ended with a loss to MECC regular-season champion Gannon, ranked no. 4 in Division II, in the conference tournament third-place game. Playing on their home floor after getting upset by Philadelphia Textile in the semifinals, the Golden Knights fell 11 points behind Le Moyne early before an extended run gave them a nine-point lead early in the second half. The Dolphins responded with a 9–0 run to tie the score at 49 with 10 minutes to play. However, Gannon finished strong, defeating Le Moyne, 76–65. Scott Hicks scored a game-high 19 points for the Dolphins, and Pete Jerebko finished with 13 points and nine rebounds.

Scott Hicks and Walter Hill were named 1987 first-team all-MECC. James Henderson was named to the second team.

== Rauch arrives and Dolphins in the tournament (1987–1988) ==
The Dolphins lost Walter Hill, James Henderson and Bill Smolinski to graduation in 1987. Seniors Scott Hicks and Pete Jerebko, juniors David Niland and Steve Lauer, sophomores Russell Barnes, Jim Cunningham and Paul Rooney and redshirt freshman Julius Edwards all returned for the 1987–88 season. Le Moyne's most prized freshman recruit was 6'6" fourth-team all-state center Len Rauch from Bishop Ludden. Rauch averaged 17.3 points per game as a high school senior, and his team reached the state final. Joining Rauch were Andy Bechtle, a 6'5" forward from James Madison High School in Vienna, Virginia and Matt Lucas, a 6'6 1/2" forward from Bellport High School on Long Island. Bechtle averaged 19 points and 10 rebounds as a high school senior, and Lucas scored 12 points and had 12 boards and six blocked shots per game. Sophomore walk-on Tim Smith, a 6'0" guard from Ridgewood, New Jersey was also added to the team. Jerebko and Hicks were named co-captains. After a three-year absence, cheerleaders returned to Le Moyne home games in 1987.

After leading by three points at intermission, the Dolphins opened the second half of their November 20, 1987 semifinal of the First Citizens Classic at Mansfield University against Kean with a 20–5 run and cruised to a 91–73 victory. Pete Jerebko scored 12 of Le Moyne's 20 points during the decisive spurt and finished with a game-high 33 points. Scott Hicks had a double-double, scoring 16 points and grabbing 13 rebounds for the Dolphins, who won their season opener for the seventh straight year. The following evening, in the tournament final, the Dolphins squandered a five-point lead in the closing minutes and lost to host Mansfield, 80–79. Jerebko scored 19 points to lead Le Moyne.

After more than 11 years since the last meeting between the teams, the Dolphins renewed their rivalry with Division I Siena on December 5. The Indians raced to an early 12-point lead, but Le Moyne responded with a run to tie the game with a minute to play before the break. Siena scored six points in the final minute of the half to take a 45–39 lead at intermission. The Dolphins remained within striking distance and had a chance to tie the game in the final minute, but Pete Jerebko's three-point attempt was off the mark, and Le Moyne suffered a difficult road loss, 75–70. Freshman Len Rauch led the Dolphins with 25 points and 14 rebounds. Scott Hicks scored 12 points for Le Moyne, surpassing 1,000 points for his career. Freshman Marc Brown scored 20 points for Siena.

The Dolphins overcame a lethargic first half and defeated Southampton, 87–77, in the semifinal of the Le Moyne–Coca-Cola Classic on December 11. Scott Hicks scored 21 points to lead Le Moyne. Pete Jerebko and Len Rauch each had a double-double. Jerebko finished with 20 points and 15 rebounds, and Rauch added 10 points and 11 boards. Daryl Cambrelen had a game-high 33 points, 10 rebounds, six assists and four steals in a losing effort for the Colonials. In the tournament final the following evening, the Dolphins went on a 27–8 extended run in the first half, led by 22 points and the break and never allowed Keene State to get closer than 16 points down in the second half, cruising to a 92–60 victory and the tournament title. Pete Jerebko and Russell Barnes each scored 20 points for Le Moyne, and Jerebko was named the tournament's most valuable player. Barnes and Scott Hicks were named to the all-tournament team. Julius Edwards was the primary defender on Steve Kaufman, who had shot 8 for 9 from three-point range for the Owls in their semifinal game, and held him to just five points.

The Dolphins fell to Millersville, 85–74, in the semifinals of the Mount St. Mary's Holiday Tournament on December 28. Le Moyne trailed, 75–73, but Dolphin turnovers in the final two minutes allowed the Marauders to pull away for the win. Julius Edwards and Pete Jerebko each scored 18 points to lead Le Moyne. The following evening, the Dolphins went on a 31–17 run to erase a 13-point second half deficit and defeat Lock Haven, 78–75, and claim third place in the tournament. Sophomore walk-on Jim Cunningham hot a pair of free throws in the final minute to extend Le Moyne's lead to three points. John Jekot's potential game-tying three-pointer bounded off the rim at the buzzer. Cunningham was pressed into duty, because Pete Jerebko was ejected after committing a flagrant foul with 17:43 to play. Scott Hicks scored 28 points to lead the Dolphins, who improved to 6–3 on the season.

The Dolphins avenged an early season loss, when they entertained Mansfield on January 18, 1988. A 16–0 run gave Le Moyne a 29–10 lead with 11:48 to play in the first half. At intermission, the Dolphins were up, 54–30. The Mountaineers were unable to challenge in the second half, and Le Moyne cruised to a 99–72 victory. The Dolphins suffocated Mansfield's smaller point guards with pressing defense and were able to easily shoot over them. Julius Edwards shot 7 for 8 from the floor and finished with 15 points. Pete Jerebko scored 29 points to lead Le Moyne, shooting 11 for 13 from the floor, including 7 for 9 from three-point range. The win was the sixth straight for the Dolphins and improved their record to 11–3.

After a win at Hamilton, the Dolphins were riding a seven-game winning streak as they prepared to host Gannon, ranked no. 9 in Division II, in a battle for first place in the MECC on January 23. In a game that featured 11 lead changes and 11 ties, the Dolphins led, 76–72, after Russell Barnes hit a 15-foot jump shot with 1:26 to play. The Golden Knights scored on an offensive rebound to cut the lead to two points with 1:01 remaining. Len Rauch missed the front end of a one-and-one with 31 seconds left, but Pete Jerebko grabbed the rebound for the Dolphins, who tried to run out the clock. However, Gannon's Roland Shannonhouse stole the ball from David Niland and went the length of the floor for a layup to send the game to overtime. After Jerebko found Julius Edwards for a layup to give Le Moyne an 82–81 lead with 1:17 remaining in overtime, the Dolphins' offense sputtered, while Gannon was 6 for 6 from the free-throw line. Le Moyne was down, 83–82, when Gannon stole the ball from Edwards and hit a pair of free throws with 25 seconds to play. The Golden Knights' lead swelled to five points, after Rauch's errant pass was stolen by Gannon's Mitch Smith, who hit two more free throws with 11 seconds left. Scott Hicks sank a three-pointer for Le Moyne at the buzzer, but Gannon escaped with an 87–85 victory. Rauch just missed a triple-double with nine points, 10 rebounds and 10 assists, but he also committed six turnovers. Hicks led Le Moyne with 27 points, and Jerebko scored 22. Barnes had 18 points and eight assists. The Dolphins dropped to 12–4 overall and 3–1 in MECC play.

Freshman Len Rauch became the first Le Moyne player to record an official triple-double (since assists became a permanent official NCAA statistic in the 1983–84 season) in a 91–67 home win over Adelphi on February 6. Rauch finished with 18 points, 19 rebounds and 10 assists. Pete Jerebko scored 28 points, shooting 6 for 8 from three-point range, to lead the Dolphins, who improved to 16–4 overall and 5–1 in MECC play with their fourth straight win. A few days later, Le Moyne learned that sophomore walk-on Tim Smith would miss the rest of the season, because of a detached retina in his right eye.

Following a 78–71 road win at Philadelphia Textile, which improved the Dolphins' record to 17–4 overall and 6–1 in MECC play, Le Moyne was ranked no. 16 in the NCAA Division II poll on February 15. It was the Dolphins' first appearance in a major poll since finishing the 1964–65 season no. 14 in the United Press International (UPI) small college coaches' poll.

The Dolphins overcame a 10-point second-half deficit and earned an 82–81 road win at Mercyhurst on February 26, clinching at least a share of the MECC regular-season title. With nine minutes to play, Le Moyne went on a 15–5 run to tie the score at 70. A baseline jump shot by Scott Hicks gave the Dolphins an 80–78 lead with 40 seconds remaining. The Lakers regained the lead with a three-point basket, but Le Moyne pushed the ball up the floor without calling a timeout, and Russell Barned was fouled. Barnes hit both ends of a one-and-one with six seconds left to secure the victory, which improved the no. 14-ranked Dolphins to 21–4 overall and 8–1 in MECC play.

The following evening, the Dolphins fell at Gannon, 77–66, giving the Golden Knights, ranked no. 12, the top seed in the MECC tournament and the right to host. Both teams finished 8–2 in league play, but Gannon's head-to-head sweep of the Dolphins gave them the tiebreaker. Le Moyne led by as many as six points in the first half, but Gannon's man-to-man defense forced the Dolphins' shooting to turn cold. Despite fouling out in the second half, Len Rauch scored 23 points to lead the Dolphins, who fell to 21–5 overall.

Scott Hicks hit a jump shot from the right side of the free-throw line with two seconds to play, and the second-seeded Dolphins escaped with a 73–72 victory over no. 3 seed Philadelphia Textile in their MECC semifinal game on March 4. Le Moyne took an early 17–4 lead, before the Rams cut the deficit to four points at halftime. Philadelphia Textile surged ahead in the second half, and the Dolphins trailed, 69–65, with three minutes to play. A three-point basket by Julius Edwards and a free throw by Len Rauch completing a three-point play gave Le Moyne a 71–69 lead, but the Rams responded with a three-point basket by Tom Barton to reclaim the lead, 72–71. After an empty possession, the Dolphins fouled Doug Lukinuk with 27 seconds left, and he missed the front end of a one-and-one. Hicks snatched the rebound, and Le Moyne called a timeout. Le Moyne got the ball to Len Rauch, whose driving layup was blocked. Pete Jerebko recovered the ball at the top of the key and found Hicks for the game winner. Edwards scored 21 points to lead the Dolphins. Rauch had a double-double with 12 points, 11 rebounds and seven assists.

The following evening, the 18th-ranked Dolphins met no. 13 Gannon in a matchup of the conference regular-season co-champions for the MECC tournament title in front of a sold-out crowd of 3,000 on the Golden Knights' home floor. Early in the game, Le Moyne took what would prove to be the largest lead either team would have at 12–6. After Gannon pulled within a point at 15–14, neither team would lead by more than four points the rest of the way. The Golden Knights took their first lead, 42–40, with 15:56 to play. The Dolphins trailed, 63–61, in the closing seconds, and Len Rauch was fouled with no time showing on the game clock. The freshman hit both free throws to send the game to overtime. Scott Hicks hit a reverse layup to give the Dolphins a 69–67 lead with 1:10 remaining in the extra session. After an empty possession for Gannon, the Golden Knights fouled Rauch with nine seconds to go, and he hit both free throws to secure the win and the MECC's automatic bid to the 1988 NCAA tournament, Le Moyne's first tournament appearance in 19 years. Pete Jerebko scored 23 points to lead the Dolphins and claim the tournament's most valuable player award. Hicks finished the game with 19 points, and Rauch had 12; both players were named to the all-tournament team. Russell Barnes had eight points and 10 assists for Le Moyne, who improved to 23–5 on the season.

The MECC champion Dolphins were seeded no. 3 in the East Region of the NCAA tournament. Joining Le Moyne were no. 1 seed California (PA), champions of the Pennsylvania State Athletic Conference (PSAC), no. 2 seed Gannon and no. 4 seed Kutztown, an at-large team from the PSAC. Gannon made a successful bid of $28,593 for the right to host the regional. Le Moyne bid $3,925, and California and Kutztown each bid $3,925. To avoid first-round games between teams from the same conference, the NCAA granted permission for the no. 1 seed to play the no. 3 seed and the no. 2 seed to play the no. 4 seed in the regional semifinals.

California (PA) used an up-tempo offense fueled by a quick man-to-man defense that forced 13 Le Moyne first-half turnovers to build a 10-point halftime lead in the regional semifinal on March 11. The Vulcans opened the second-half with an 8–0 run, putting the Dolphins 18 points down. However, the Dolphins found their shooting touch and battled back to cut the deficit to 85–76. A late 10–2 run sparked by a pair of Pete Jerebko three-pointers and four points from Scott Hicks brought Le Moyne within a single point at 87–86 with 1:20 to play. California worked the clock, and the Dolphins forced a miss, but the Vulcans got an offensive rebound. A pair of free throws extended the Vulcans' lead to 89–86 with 32 seconds remaining. Julius Edwards responded for Le Moyne with a 15 footer from the baseline with 16 seconds to go. Le Moyne pressed the ensuing inbounds play, forcing California to call a timeout. The Vulcans got the ball to Darryl Norfleet, who was fouled and hit both ends of the one-and-one to give California a 91–88 with eight seconds left. The Dolphins got the ball to Jerebko at the top of the key, but he was double teamed and passed to Hicks, who put up a three-pointer that was off the mark. The Vulcans grabbed the rebound and held on for the win. Len Rauch had a double-double for Le Moyne with 24 points on 12-for-16 shooting from the floor, 11 rebounds and seven assists. Jerebko had 16 points, seven boards and seven assists. David Niland had seven assists off the bench. Hicks finished with 21 points.

The following evening, the Dolphins rebounded to defeat Kutztown, 89–81, and finish third in the region. Le Moyne had an 81–74 lead, when Kutztown went on a 5–0 run to cut their deficit to two points. Russell Barnes scored a basket to extend the Dolphins' lead to four points. After the Golden Bears got within two points again, Le Moyne closed the game on a 6–0 run sparked by a three-point play by Barnes and capped by a putback of an offensive rebound by Len Rauch. Despite spending much time on the bench in the first half after getting called for a technical foul, Rauch finished with 16 points. Pete Jerebko scored 28 points to lead the Dolphins in his final collegiate game. Jerebko finished his career with 1,740 points, second on Le Moyne's all-time scoring list. Scott Hicks had 22 points in his college career coda and was named to the all-regional tournament team. Le Moyne finished the season 24–6 overall.

The team's 24 wins were the most in program history up to that point. John Beilein was named 1988 MECC coach of the year. Pete Jerebko was selected as MECC player of the year and senior of the year. Len Rauch was MECC freshman of the year. Scott Hicks joined Jerebko on all-MECC first team. Rauch was second-team all-MECC. The 1987–88 Dolphins were inducted into the Le Moyne College Athletic Hall of Fame as a team in 2017.

== See also ==
- History of Le Moyne Dolphins men's basketball (1979–1983)
- History of Le Moyne Dolphins men's basketball (1988–1992)
