= 1988 NCAA Division II men's basketball tournament =

- Teams: 32
- Finals site: , Springfield, Massachusetts
- Champions: Lowell Chiefs (1st title)
- Runner-up: Alaska–Anchorage Seawolves (1st title game)
- Semifinalists: Florida Southern Moccasins (5th Final Four); Troy State Trojans (1st Final Four)
- Winning coach: Don Doucette (1st title)
- MOP: Leo Parent (Lowell)
- Attendance: 56,123

The 1988 NCAA Division II men's basketball tournament involved 32 schools playing in a single-elimination tournament to determine the national champion of men's NCAA Division II college basketball as a culmination of the 1987–88 NCAA Division II men's basketball season. It was won by the University of Lowell (now the University of Massachusetts Lowell), and Lowell's Leo Parent was the Most Outstanding Player.

1988 NCAA Division II Men's sites - regionals (cyan) Quarterfinals (orange) Final Four (red)

== Regional participants ==
School	Outcome
Assumption	Fourth Place
Lowell	Regional Champion
New Haven	Runner-up
Quinnipiac	Third Place

School	Outcome
Alabama A&M	Regional Champion
Ashland	Fourth Place
Kentucky Wesleyan	Runner-up
Lewis	Third Place

School	Outcome
Florida Southern	Regional Champion
Norfolk State	Fourth Place
North Alabama	Third Place
Tampa	Runner-up

School	Outcome
Angelo State	Fourth Place
Missouri–St. Louis	Runner-up
South Dakota State	Third Place
SE Missouri State	Regional Champion

School	Outcome
Augustana (SD)	Fourth Place
Ferris State	Regional Champion
St. Cloud State	Third Place
UC Riverside	Runner-up

School	Outcome
Alaska–Anchorage	Regional Champion
Cal State Bakersfield	Third Place
Cal State Hayward	Runner-up
Sacramento State	Fourth Place

School	Outcome
North Carolina Central	Runner-up
Troy State	Regional Champion
Virginia State	Fourth Place
Virginia Union	Third Place

School	Outcome
California (PA)	Runner-up
Gannon	Regional Champion
Kutztown	Fourth Place
Le Moyne	Third Place

*denotes tie

== Regionals ==
=== New England - New Haven, Connecticut ===
Location: Charger Gymnasium Host: University of New Haven

Regional semifinals Round of 32; March 11
Lowell	90
Assumption	65
New Haven	96
Quinnipiac	62

Regional final Sweet 16; March 12
Lowell	84
New Haven	72

- Third Place - Quinnipiac 88, Assumption 73

=== Great Lakes - Owensboro, Kentucky ===
Location: Owensboro Sportscenter Host: Kentucky Wesleyan College

Regional semifinals Round of 32; March 12
Kentucky Wesleyan	82
Lewis	74
Alabama A&M	75*
Ashland	73

Regional final Sweet 16; March 13
Kentucky Wesleyan	88
Alabama A&M	92

- Third Place - Lewis 89, Ashland 73

=== South - Lakeland, Florida ===
Location: Jenkins Field House Host: Florida Southern College

Regional semifinals Round of 32; March 11
Tampa	71
Norfolk State	68
Florida Southern	99
North Alabama	76

Regional final Sweet 16; March 12
Tampa	63
Florida Southern	76

- Third Place - North Alabama 87, Norfolk State 76

=== South Central - Cape Girardeau, Missouri ===
Location: Show Me Center Host: Southeast Missouri State University

Regional semifinals Round of 32; March 11
Missouri–St. Louis	68
South Dakota State	63
SE Missouri State	111
Angelo State	75

Regional final Sweet 16; March 12
Missouri–St. Louis	69
SE Missouri State	73

- Third Place - South Dakota State 87, Angelo State 84

=== North Central - Saint Cloud, Minnesota ===
Location: Halenbeck Hall Host: St. Cloud State University

Regional semifinals Round of 32; March 11
Ferris State	91
Augustana (SD)	75
UC Riverside	78
St. Cloud State	71

Regional final Sweet 16; March 12
Ferris State	80
UC Riverside	64

- Third Place - St. Cloud State 118, Augustana 114**

=== West - Hayward, California ===
Location: Physical Education Complex Host: California State University, Hayward

Regional semifinals Round of 32; March 11
Alaska–Anchorage	89*
Cal State Bakersfield	82
Cal State Hayward	96
Sacramento State	85

Regional final Sweet 16; March 12
Alaska–Anchorage	72
Cal State Hayward	67

- Third Place - Cal State Bakersfield 90, Sacramento State 89

=== South Atlantic - Richmond, Virginia ===
Location: Arthur Ashe, Jr. Athletic Center Host: Virginia Union University

Regional semifinals Round of 32; March 11
North Carolina Central	56
Virginia State	49
Troy State	75
Virginia Union	71

Regional final Sweet 16; March 12
North Carolina Central	65
Troy State	66*

- Third Place - Virginia Union 90, Virginia State 89

=== East - Erie, Pennsylvania ===
Location: Hammermill Center Host: Gannon University

Regional semifinals Round of 32; March 11
California (PA)	91
Le Moyne	88
Gannon	84
Kutztown	64

Regional final Sweet 16; March 12
California (PA)	75
Gannon	93

- Third Place - Le Moyne 89, Kutztown 81

*denotes each overtime played

== National Quarterfinals ==
Quarterfinal - Normal, AL; Elite Eight; March 19
Lowell	76
Alabama A&M	68

Quarterfinal - Lakeland, FL; Elite Eight; March 19
Florida Southern	78
SE Missouri State	75

Quarterfinal - Troy, AL; Elite Eight; March 19
Troy State	100
Gannon	79

Quarterfinal - Anchorage, AK; Elite Eight; March 19
Ferris State	85
Alaska-Anchorage	97

== National Finals - Springfield, Massachusetts ==
Location: Springfield Civic Center Hosts: American International College and Springfield College

National semifinals Final Four; March 25
Lowell	88
Florida Southern	81
Alaska–Anchorage	77
Troy State	72

National championship March 26
Lowell	75
Alaska–Anchorage	72

- Third Place - Florida Southern 94, Troy State 84

*denotes each overtime played

== All-tournament team ==
- Jerry Johnson (Florida Southern)
- Bobby Licare (Lowell)
- Leo Parent (Lowell)
- Averian Parrish (Alaska–Anchorage)
- Darryl Thomas (Troy State)

== See also ==
- 1988 NCAA Division II women's basketball tournament
- 1988 NCAA Division I men's basketball tournament
- 1988 NCAA Division III men's basketball tournament
- 1988 NAIA men's basketball tournament

== Sources ==
- 2010 NCAA Men's Basketball Championship Tournament Records and Statistics: Division II men's basketball Championship
- 1988 NCAA Division II men's basketball tournament jonfmorse.com
