= 2014–15 Illinois State Redbirds men's basketball team =

American college basketball season

2014–15 Illinois State Redbirds men's basketball

NIT, second round
- Conference: Missouri Valley Conference
- Record: 22–13 (11–7 MVC)
- Head coach: Dan Muller (3rd season)
- Assistant coaches: Torrey Ward; Luke Yaklich; Dean Oliver
- Home arena: Doug Collins Court at Redbird Arena

2014–15 Missouri Valley Conference men's basketball standings
	Conf.				Overall
Team	W		L	PCT	W		L	PCT
No. 14 Wichita State	17	–	1	.944	30	–	5	.857
No. 11 Northern Iowa †	16	–	2	.889	31	–	4	.886
Indiana State	11	–	7	.611	15	–	16	.484
Illinois State	11	–	7	.611	22	–	13	.629
Evansville	9	–	9	.500	24	–	12	.667
Loyola Chicago	8	–	10	.444	24	–	13	.649
Drake	6	–	12	.333	9	–	22	.290
Missouri State	5	–	13	.278	11	–	20	.355
Southern Illinois	4	–	14	.222	12	–	21	.364
Bradley	3	–	15	.167	9	–	24	.273
† 2015 MVC tournament winner Rankings from AP poll

The 2014–15 Illinois State Redbirds men's basketball team represented Illinois State University during the 2014–15 NCAA Division I men's basketball season. The Redbirds, led by third-year head coach Dan Muller, played their home games at Redbird Arena in Normal, Illinois as a member of the Missouri Valley Conference. They finished the season 22–13, 11–7 in conference play, to finish in a tie for third place. As the number four seed in the MVC tournament, they defeated Evansville in a quarterfinal game and eighth ranked Wichita State in a semifinal game before succumbing to eleventh ranked Northern Iowa in the final. They received an at-large bid to the National Invitation Tournament where they won over Green Bay in the first round before losing to Old Dominion in the second round.

On April 7, following the conclusion of the NCAA tournament title game, deputy director of athletics Aaron Leetch and men's basketball associate head coach Torrey Ward were among seven people who perished during an airplane crash of a twin-engine Cessna 414 in a soybean field on the eastern outskirts of Bloomington, Illinois. The flight, which originated from an Indianapolis airport, was en route to Central Illinois Regional Airport.

== Previous season ==
The Redbirds finished the 2013–14 season 18–16, 9–9 in conference play, to finish in a tie for fourth place. For the Missouri Valley tournament they were the number five seed and were defeated by Missouri State in a quarterfinal game. They accepted an invitation to the College Basketball Invitational where they were victorious over Morehead State in the first round and Texas A&M in the quarterfinal round before losing to Siena in the semifinal round.

== Offseason ==
=== Departures ===
Name	#	Pos.	Height	Weight	Year	Hometown	Comment
Michael Middlebrooks	25	F	6'9"	210	Jr	Seattle, WA	Suspended; Adams State
Jamaal Samuel	5	F	6'9"	200	RS So	New Orleans, LA	Louisiana–Monroe
Nick Zeisloft	15	G	6'4"	185	RS So	LaGrange, IL	Indiana
Kaza Keane	0	G	6'1"	185	So	Ajax, Ontario	Cleveland State
Zach Lofton	23	G	6'4"	200	So	Saint Paul, MN	Minnesota
Matt Stacho	31	G	6'1"	180	So	Naperville, IL	Left program

=== Arrivals ===
==== Transfers ====
Name	Pos.	Height	Weight	Year	Hometown	Prior School
DeVaughn Akoon–Purcell	G	6'5"	185	Jr	Orlando, FL	Eastern Oklahoma State College
Nick Banyard	F	6'8"	205	Jr	Flower Mound, TX	New Mexico
Justin McCloud	G	6'4"	188	Jr	Bottineau, ND	Bismarck State College
Will Ransom	F	6'8"	235	Jr	Green Lake, WI	Daytona Beach Community College
Mark Hall	G	6'3"	170	RS So	Round Lake Beach, IL	Eastern Wyoming College

== Roster ==
2014–15 Illinois State Redbirds men's basketball team
Players
Coaches

Pos.	#	Name	Height	Weight	Year	Previous school	Hometown
F	0	Nick Banyard (I)	6 ft 8 in (2.03 m)	205 lb (93 kg)	Jr	Edwards Marcus High School; New Mexico	Flower Mound, TX
G	1	Paris Lee	5 ft 11 in (1.8 m)	175 lb (79 kg)	So	Proviso East High School	Maywood, IL
G	3	Daishon Knight	6 ft 1 in (1.85 m)	175 lb (79 kg)	Sr	Lake Clifton Eastern High School; Odessa College	Baltimore, MD
G	4	Bobby Hunter	5 ft 10 in (1.78 m)	194 lb (88 kg)	RS Sr	Bishop Manogue High School; Santa Fe College	Reno, NV
G	5	Mark Hall	6 ft 3 in (1.91 m)	170 lb (77 kg)	RS So	Grayslake North High School; Eastern Wyoming College	Round Lake Beach, IL
C	10	John Jones	6 ft 9 in (2.06 m)	260 lb (118 kg)	Sr	The Howe School	Saint Michael, Barbados
F	11	MiKyle McIntosh	6 ft 7 in (2.01 m)	237 lb (108 kg)	RS Fr	22 Feet Academy	Pickering, ON
G	12	Tony Wills	6 ft 3 in (1.91 m)	180 lb (82 kg)	So	Ben Davis High School	Indianapolis, IN
G	15	Justin McCloud	6 ft 4 in (1.93 m)	188 lb (85 kg)	Jr	Bottineau High School; Bismarck State College	Bottineau, ND
C	22	Reggie Lynch	6 ft 10 in (2.08 m)	255 lb (116 kg)	So	Edina High School	Edina, MN
F	24	Deontae Hawkins	6 ft 8 in (2.03 m)	225 lb (102 kg)	RS Fr	Dunbar High School	Dayton, OH
F	42	Will Ransom	6 ft 8 in (2.03 m)	240 lb (109 kg)	Jr	North Crowley High School; Daytona State College	Fort Worth, TX
G	44	DeVaughn Akoon-Purcell	6 ft 5 in (1.96 m)	185 lb (84 kg)	Jr	West Oaks Academy; Eastern Oklahoma State College	Orlando, FL

Head coach

- Dan Muller (Illinois State)

Assistant coach(es)

- Torrey Ward (UAB)
- Luke Yaklich (Illinois State)
- Dean Oliver (Iowa)

Legend

- (C) Team captain
- (S) Suspended
- (I) Ineligible
- (W) Walk-on
- Injured
- Current redshirt

Roster
Last update: March 24, 2015

== Schedule and results ==
Date time, TV	Rank^{#}	Opponent^{#}	Result	Record	High points	High rebounds	High assists	Site (attendance) city, state
Exhibition Season
November 10, 2014*; 7:00 pm		Lewis	W 76–67		14 – Lee	12 – Lynch	5 – Knight	Doug Collins Court at Redbird Arena (4,063); Normal, IL
Non-conference regular season
November 16, 2014*; 4:00 pm		Utah State	L 55–60	0–1	17 – Knight	10 – Akoon–Purcell	5 – Lee	Doug Collins Court at Redbird Arena (4,921); Normal, IL
November 21, 2014*; 8:00 pm		vs. Weber State; U. S. Virgin Islands Paradise Jam [Quarterfinal]	W 73–64	1–1	20 – Akoon–Purcell	7 – Akoon–Purcell	3 – Hunter	Sports and Fitness Center (1,910); St. Thomas, USVI
November 23, 2014*; 8:00 pm, CBSSN		vs. Old Dominion; U. S. Virgin Islands Paradise Jam [Semifinal]	W 64–45	2–1	12 – Hunter, Akoon–Purcell	8 – Knight	5 – Knight	Sports and Fitness Center (2,005); St. Thomas, USVI
November 24, 2014*; 8:00 pm, CBSSN		vs. Seton Hall; U. S. Virgin Islands Paradise Jam [Final]	L 80–84	2–2	23 – Hunter	7 – Jones	6 – Knight	Sports and Fitness Center (2,955); St. Thomas, USVI
November 29, 2014*; 2:00 pm		Youngstown State	W 85–73 ^{OT}	3–2	20 – Hunter	15 – Hawkins	4 – Lee	Doug Collins Court at Redbird Arena (4,095); Normal, IL
December 2, 2014*; 7:00 pm, CSN Chicago Plus		VCU	L 62–66	3–3	18 – Akoon–Purcell	7 – Akoon–Purcell	4 – Lee	Doug Collins Court at Redbird Arena (7,142); Normal, IL
December 7, 2014*; 2:00 pm, CSN Chicago		at UAB	W 78–73	4–3	18 – McIntosh	9 – Lynch	6 – Lee	Bartow Arena (2,234); Birmingham, AL
December 14, 2014*; 3:00 pm, FS1		at DePaul	W 78–72	5–3	25 – Knight	13 – Lynch	3 – Lee	Allstate Arena (6,323); Rosemont, IL
December 17, 2014*; 7:00 pm		UT Martin	W 64–54	6–3	18 – Knight	9 – McIntosh	5 – Knight	Doug Collins Court at Redbird Arena (4,037); Normal, IL
December 20, 2014*; 3:00 pm		at Murray State	L 77–89	6–4	26 – Knight	8 – Jones	3 – Lee	CFSB Center (2,979); Murray, KY
December 22, 2014*; 6:00 pm		IPFW	W 68–43	7–4	12 – Knight	8 – Wills	3 – Knight, Lee	Doug Collins Court at Redbird Arena (4,108); Normal, IL
December 29, 2014*; 6:00 pm		Quincy	W 99–57	8–4	18 – McCloud	7 – Jones, McIntosh	9 – Lee	Doug Collins Court at Redbird Arena (4,093); Normal, IL
Missouri Valley Conference regular season
December 31, 2014; 3:00 pm, CSN Chicago		Indiana State	L 61–63	8–5 (0–1)	16 – Wills	6 – Ransom	3 – Wills	Doug Collins Court at Redbird Arena (5,372); Normal, IL
January 4, 2015; 4:30 pm, ESPNU		at No. 16 Wichita State	L 62–70	8–6 (0–2)	24 – Knight	7 – McIntosh	3 – Hunter	Charles Koch Arena (10,506); Wichita, KS
January 7, 2015; 7:00 pm, ESPN3		Drake	W 81–45	9–6 (2–1)	15 – Knight	9 – McIntosh	6 – Wills	Doug Collins Court at Redbird Arena (3,809); Normal, IL
January 11, 2015; 2:00 pm, ESPN3		at Missouri State	W 69–55	10–6 (2–2)	17 – Hunter	7 – Lynch	5 – Lee	JQH Arena (5,224); Springfield, MO
January 14, 2015; 6:00 pm		at Indiana State	L 70–71 ^{OT}	10–7 (2–3)	21 – Knight	8 – Lynch	4 – Lee	Hulman Center (4,335); Terre Haute, IN
January 17, 2015; 4:00 pm, CSN Chicago		Bradley; I–74 Rivalry	W 82–72	11–7 (3–3)	20 – Knight	5 – Hunter, McIntosh	5 – Hunter, Lee	Doug Collins Court at Redbird Arena (9,627); Normal, IL
January 20, 2015; 7:00 pm		at Drake	W 64–56	12–7 (4–3)	20 – Knight	9 – Lynch	3 – Wills	The Knapp Center (2,886); Des Moines, IA
January 25, 2015; 3:00 pm, ESPNU		No. 20 Northern Iowa	L 53–54	12–8 (4–4)	13 – Hunter	7 – Akoon–Purcell	3 – Wills	Doug Collins Court at Redbird Arena (6,118); Normal, IL
January 28, 2015; 7:00 pm, ESPN3		Missouri State	W 67–57	13–8 (5–4)	20 – Akoon–Purcell	12 – Akoon–Purcell	6 – Lee	Doug Collins Court at Redbird Arena (4,177); Normal, IL
January 31, 2015; 1:00 pm, MVC Network (CSN Chicago/FSMW)		at Loyola–Chicago	W 48–45	14–8 (6–4)	11 – Hawkins	5 – Jones, Hawkins	2 – Hunter, Knight	Joseph J. Gentile Arena (3,256); Chicago, IL
February 3, 2015; 7:00 pm, ESPN3		Evansville	W 77–51	15–8 (7–4)	16 – Lynch	6 – Akoon–Purcell	7 – Lee	Doug Collins Court at Redbird Arena (4,352); Normal, IL
February 7, 2015; 1:00 pm, MVC Network		at Southern Illinois	L 59–65	15–9 (7–5)	19 – Akoon–Purcell	8 – Lynch, Hawkins	6 – Lee	SIU Arena (4,885); Carbondale, IL
February 11, 2015; 7:00 pm, ESPN3		at No. 13 Northern Iowa	L 64–83	15–10 (7–6)	16 – Knight	11 – Hawkins	3 – Wills	McLeod Center (6,103); Cedar Falls, IA
February 14, 2015; 5:00 pm, ESPN2		No. 15 Wichita State	L 62–68	15–11 (7–7)	18 – Akoon–Purcell	8 – Lynch	7 – Knight	Doug Collins Court at Redbird Arena (9,345); Normal, IL
February 18, 2015; 8:00 pm, MVC Network		at Bradley; I–74 Rivalry	W 60–47	16–11 (8–7)	15 – Knight	9 – Hawkins	3 – Knight, Hawkins	Carver Arena (7,349); Peoria, IL
February 21, 2015; 7:00 pm, CSN Chicago		Loyola–Chicago	W 67–60	17–11 (9–7)	21 – Knight	8 – McIntosh	2 – Knight, Lee	Doug Collins Court at Redbird Arena (6,406); Normal, IL
February 25, 2015; 7:00 pm, ESPN3		Southern Illinois	W 73–56	18–11 (10–7)	24 – Akoon–Purcell	7 – Akoon–Purcell	5 – Lee	Doug Collins Court at Redbird Arena (5,188); Normal, IL
February 28, 2015; 1:00 pm		at Evansville	W 69–67 ^{OT}	19–11 (11–7)	16 – Akoon–Purcell	9 – Jones, Akoon–Purcell	3 – Akoon–Purcell, McCloud, Lee	Ford Center (5,491); Evansville, IN
State Farm Missouri Valley Conference {MVC} Tournament
March 6, 2015*; 2:30 pm, MVC Network	(4)	vs. (5) Evansville; Arch Madness [Quarterfinal]	W 71–67	20–11	17 – Hawkins	7 – Hawkins	4 – Lee	Scottrade Center (9,015); St. Louis, MO
March 7, 2015*; 1:30 pm, MVC Network	(4)	vs. (1) No. 8 Wichita State; Arch Madness [Semifinal]	W 65–62	21–11	25 – Knight	7 – Lynch	3 – Lee	Scottrade Center (13,898); St. Louis, MO
March 8, 2015*; 1:00 pm, CBS	(4)	vs. (2) No. 11 Northern Iowa; Arch Madness [Final]	L 60–69	21–12	16 – Knight	6 – Knight	4 – Knight, Lee	Scottrade Center (13,552); St. Louis, MO
National Invitation {NIT} Tournament
March 18, 2015*; 7:00 pm, ESPNU	(4)	(5) Green Bay; Old Dominion Regional [First Round]	W 69–56	22–12	18 – Lee	9 – Hawkins	6 – Lee	Doug Collins Court at Redbird Arena (4,942); Normal, IL
March 23, 2015*; 7:00 pm, ESPNU	(4)	at (1) Old Dominion; Old Dominion Regional [Second Round]	L 49–50	22–13	14 – Knight	8 – Akoon–Purcell	3 – Akoon–Purcell	Ted Constant Convocation Center (5,923); Norfolk, VA
*Non-conference game. ^{#}Rankings from AP Poll. (#) Tournament seedings in parentheses. All times are in Central Time.
