= Mark Adams (basketball, born May 1956) =

American basketball coach

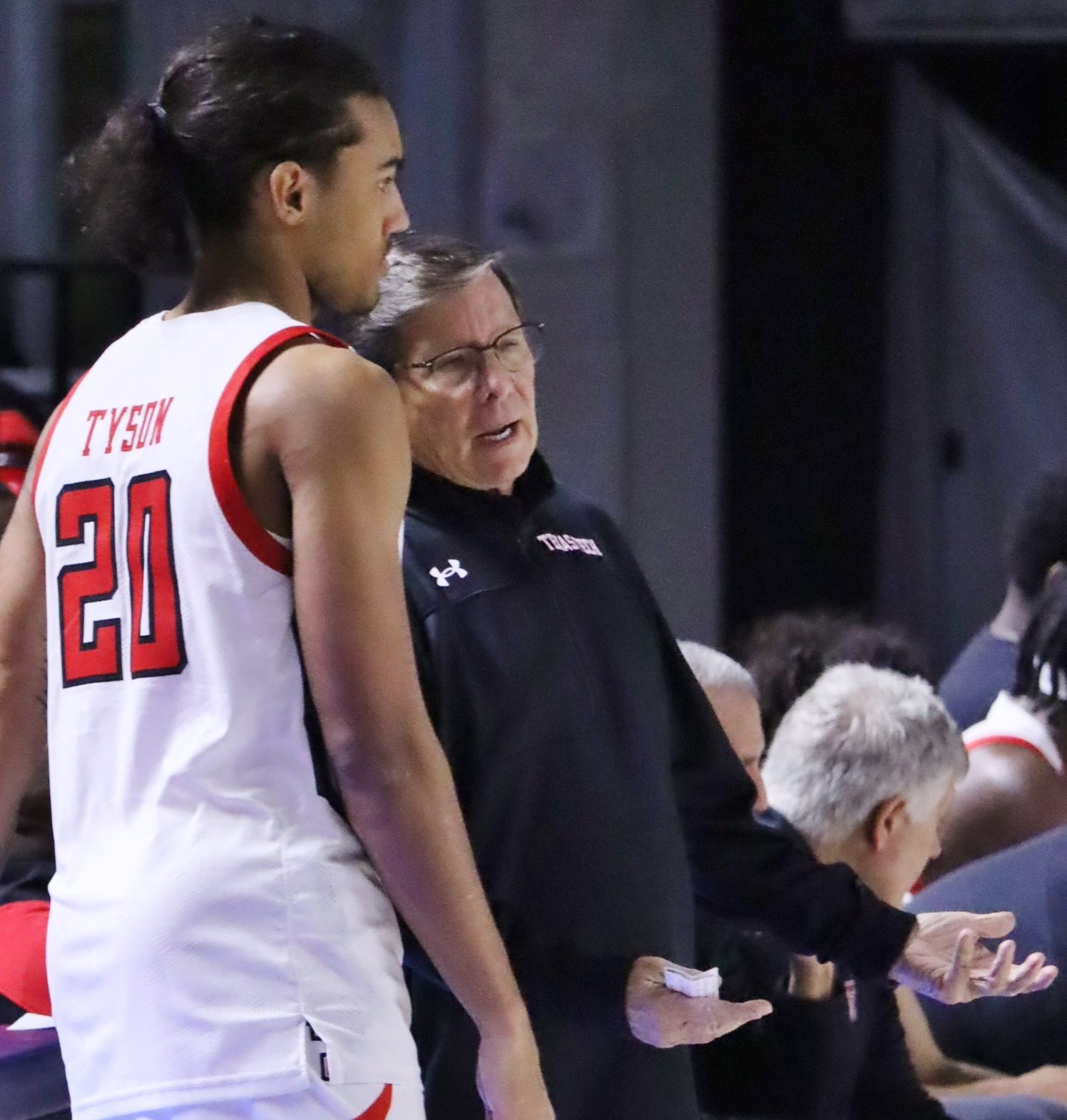
- Adams (right) with Texas Tech in 2022

Current position
- Title: Assistant coach
- Team: Ole Miss
- Conference: SEC

Biographical details
- Born: May 14, 1956 (age 70); Brownfield, Texas, U.S.
- Education: Texas Tech ('79)

Playing career
- 1974–1976: South Plains College

Coaching career (HC unless noted)
- 1981–1983: Clarendon College (TX)
- 1983–1987: Wayland Baptist
- 1987–1992: West Texas A&M
- 1992–1997: Texas–Pan American
- 2004–2013: Howard College
- 2015–2016: Little Rock (assistant)
- 2016–2021: Texas Tech (assistant)
- 2021–2023: Texas Tech
- 2023–2024: East Carolina (assistant)
- 2024–present: Ole Miss (assistant)

Administrative career (AD unless noted)
- 2013–2015: Texas Tech (dir. of basketball operations)

Head coaching record
- Overall: 528–248 (.680)

Accomplishments and honors

Awards
- Jim Phelan Award (2022); NJCAA Hall of Fame (2020)

Mark Adams (born May 14, 1956) is an American college basketball coach who is currently an assistant coach at Ole Miss. He previously served as the coach of the Texas Tech Red Raiders men's basketball team.

== Coaching career ==
After playing basketball at South Plains College, Adams transferred to Texas Tech, where he served as a student assistant to head coach Gerald Myers. After graduating from Texas Tech in 1979, Adams landed his first college coaching job at Clarendon College, where he stayed for two seasons and posted 46 victories. From 1983 to 1987 he served as the head coach at Wayland Baptist, where went 100–39 overall and led the Pioneers to the 1985 NAIA title game. Adams would move on to become the head coach at West Texas A&M where he'd guide the Buffaloes to two NCAA Division II tournament appearances and compile an overall record of 108–40. In 1992, Adams accepted the Texas–Pan American job, where in five seasons he recorded a 44–90 record.

After taking time away from coaching to become the owner of the Lubbock Cotton Kings hockey team, Adams would return to basketball coaching in 2004 when he was named the head coach at Howard College. While at Howard, Adams guided the team to 233 victories, as well as a program-record 36 wins in a single season and nine consecutive NJCAA regional tournament appearances highlighted by the 2010 NJCAA Championship and a roster featuring Jae Crowder.

In 2013, Adams joined Texas Tech's staff as the director of basketball operations under Tubby Smith, a position he'd hold for two seasons before joining Chris Beard as an assistant coach at Little Rock. In his one season as an assistant with the Trojans, Adams was part of the team's 2016 regular season and Sun Belt tournament titles, along with the school's upset win over fifth-seeded Purdue in the 2016 NCAA tournament. Adams would follow Beard back to Texas Tech as an assistant coach, and has been part of three NCAA tournament squads including national runner-up in 2019.

After Beard's departure to Texas, Adams was promoted to the Red Raiders head coaching position on April 5, 2021.

Adams led Texas Tech to a 27–10 record and the NCAA tournament in his first season at the helm, reaching the Sweet Sixteen where they lost to Duke. In 2022–23, Tech finished the season with a 16–15 record and a ninth-place finish in the Big 12.

On March 5, 2023, Adams was suspended by the university over an alleged "inappropriate, unacceptable, and racially insensitive comment" that he had made to a player the previous week. In an attempt to make the player more receptive to his coaching, Adams "referenced Bible verses about workers, teachers, parents, and slaves serving their masters."

On March 8, 2023, Adams resigned from Texas Tech.

On June 18, 2024, Adams joined Ole Miss' staff as an assistant coach, reuniting with Beard, now the Rebels' head coach.

== Head coaching record ==
=== NCAA DI ===
Record table
Season	Team	Overall	Conference	Standing	Postseason
Texas–Pan American Broncs (Sun Belt Conference) (1992–1997)
1992–93	Texas–Pan American	2–20	2–16	10th	
1993–94	Texas–Pan American	16–12	9–9	T–6th	
1994–95	Texas–Pan American	14–14	10–8	4th	
1995–96	Texas–Pan American	9–19	6–12	10th	
1996–97	Texas–Pan American	3–25	1–17	10th	
Texas–Pan American:		44–90 (.328)	28–62 (.311)		
Texas Tech Red Raiders (Big 12 Conference) (2021–2023)
2021–22	Texas Tech	27–10	12–6	3rd	NCAA Division I Sweet 16
2022–23	Texas Tech	16–15	5–13	9th	
Texas Tech:		43–25 (.632)	17–19 (.472)		
Total:		87–115 (.431)			
National champion Postseason invitational champion Conference regular season champion Conference regular season and conference tournament champion Division regular season champion Division regular season and conference tournament champion Conference tournament champion

=== NCAA DII ===
Record table
Season	Team	Overall	Conference	Standing	Postseason
West Texas A&M (Lone Star) (1987–1992)
1987–88	West Texas A&M	20–9	7–3		
1988–89	West Texas A&M	18–9	10–4		
1989–90	West Texas A&M	25–7	9–5		NCAA Division II first round
1990–91	West Texas A&M	25–7	11–3		NCAA Division II first round
1991–92	West Texas A&M	20–8			
West Texas A&M:		108–40 (.730)	37–15 (.712)		
Total:		108–40 (.730)			
National champion Postseason invitational champion Conference regular season champion Conference regular season and conference tournament champion Division regular season champion Division regular season and conference tournament champion Conference tournament champion

=== NJCAA ===
Record table
Season	Team	Overall	Conference	Standing	Postseason
Howard College (WJCAC) (2004–2013)
2004–05	Howard College	25–8			
2005–06	Howard College	36–1			NJCAA Division I National tournament
2006–07	Howard College	23–7			
2007–08	Howard College	21–9			
2008–09	Howard College	20–8			
2009–10	Howard College	33–2			NJCAA Division I National champion
2010–11	Howard College	21–5			
2011–12	Howard College	23–8			
2012–13	Howard College	30–6			NJCAA Division I National tournament
Howard College:		233–54 (.812)			
Total:		233–54 (.812)			
National champion Postseason invitational champion Conference regular season champion Conference regular season and conference tournament champion Division regular season champion Division regular season and conference tournament champion Conference tournament champion

=== NAIA ===
Record table
Season	Team	Overall	Conference	Standing	Postseason
Wayland Baptist (NAIA) (1983–1987)
1983–84	Wayland Baptist	20–12			
1984–85	Wayland Baptist	30–10			NAIA Runner-Up
1985–86	Wayland Baptist	28–6			NAIA second round
1988–87	Wayland Baptist	22–11			NAIA first round
Wayland Baptist:		100–39 (.719)	0–0 (–)		
Total:		100–39 (.719)			
National champion Postseason invitational champion Conference regular season champion Conference regular season and conference tournament champion Division regular season champion Division regular season and conference tournament champion Conference tournament champion
