= 1985 NCAA Division III women's basketball tournament =

- Teams: 32
- Finals site: , DePere, Wisconsin
- Champions: Scranton Royals (1st title)
- Runner-up: New Rochelle Blue Angels (1st title game)
- Third place: Millikin Big Blue (1st Final Four)
- Fourth place: St. Norbert Green Knights (1st Final Four)
- Winning coach: Mike Strong (1st title)

The 1985 NCAA Division III women's basketball tournament was the fourth annual tournament hosted by the NCAA to determine the national champion of Division III women's collegiate basketball in the United States.

Scranton defeated New Rochelle in the championship game, 68–59, to claim the Royals' first Division III national title.

The championship rounds were hosted in DePere, Wisconsin.

== Bracket ==
=== First Round ===
- Muskingum 67, Frostburg St. 65
- Capital 85, Kean 64
- Allegheny 62, Buffalo St. 56
- New Rochelle 70, Rochester (NY) 66
- Stanislaus St. 59, Saint Mary’s (MN) 57
- Pomona-Pitzer 68, Concordia-M’head 59
- St. Norbert 72, Carroll (WI) 53
- Wis.-Whitewater 85, Alma 70
- Rust 83, Wooster 33
- UNC Greensboro 84, LeMoyne-Owen 77 (OT)
- Millikin 62, Simpson 60
- William Penn 75, Buena Vista 53
- Bridgewater St. 80, Rhode Island Col. 59
- Salem St. 78, Western Conn. St. 71
- Scranton 79, Gettysburg 57
- Pitt.-Johnstown 72, Susquehanna 62

=== Regional finals ===
- Muskingum 78, Capital 56
- New Rochelle 79, Allegheny 68
- Pomona-Pitzer 61, Stanislaus St. 47
- St. Norbert 82, Wis.-Whitewater 80 (OT)
- Rust 70, UNC Greensboro 66
- Millikin 67, William Penn 66
- Salem St. 63, Bridgewater St. 59
- Scranton 65, Pitt.-Johnstown 53

=== National finals ===
National quarterfinals
New Rochelle	74
Muskingum	73
St. Norbert	69
Pomona-Pitzer	55
Millikin	80
Rust	79
Scranton	85
Salem State	59

National semifinals
New Rochelle	61
St. Norbert	59
Millikin	75
Scranton	83

National championship
New Rochelle	59
Scranton	68
National third-place game
St. Norbert	73
Millikin	76

== All-tournament team ==
- Dawn Cillo, New Rochelle
- Lori Kerans, Millikin
- Deanna Kyle, Scranton
- Shelley Parks, Scranton
- Amy Proctor, St. Norbert

== See also ==
- 1985 NCAA Division I women's basketball tournament
- 1985 NCAA Division II women's basketball tournament
- 1985 NCAA Division III men's basketball tournament
- 1985 NAIA women's basketball tournament
