= 1985 NCAA Division II women's basketball tournament =

American collegiate basketball tournament

- Teams: 24
- Finals site: , Springfield, Massachusetts
- Champions: Cal Poly Pomona Broncos (2nd title)
- Runner-up: Central Missouri State Jennies (2nd title game)
- Semifinalists: Hampton Lady Pirates (1st Final Four); Mercer Bears (1st Final Four)
- Winning coach: Darlene May (2nd title)
- MOP: Vickie Mitchell (Cal Poly Pomona)

The 1985 NCAA Division II women's basketball tournament was the fourth annual tournament hosted by the NCAA to determine the national champion of Division II women's collegiate basketball in the United States.

Cal Poly Pomona defeated defending champions Central Missouri State in the championship game, 80–69, the Broncos' second NCAA Division II national title.

The championship rounds were contested at the Springfield Civic Center in Springfield, Massachusetts, hosted by Springfield College.

== Regionals ==
=== East ===
First round - site unknown Round of 24; March 11		Regional finals - at Pace; Sweet 16; March 12
		Pace	66
Mercy	62	Utica	63
Utica	71

=== Great Lakes ===
First round - at Lewis; Round of 24; March 11		Regional finals - at Northern Kentucky; Sweet 16; March 12
		Northern Kentucky	81
Clark Atlanta	64	Clark Atlanta	69
Lewis	63

=== New England ===
First round - at Stonehill; Round of 24; March 11		Regional finals - at Bentley; Sweet 16; March 12
		Quinnipiac	74
Bentley	67	Bentley	58
Stonehill	52

=== North Central ===
First round - at North Dakota; Round of 24; March 11		Regional finals - at South Dakota; Sweet 16; March 12
		South Dakota	55
North Dakota	46	St. Cloud State	56
St. Cloud State	66

=== South ===
First round - at Mississippi Women; Round of 24; March 11		Regional finals - at North Alabama; Sweet 16; March 12
		Mercer	90*
North Alabama	89	North Alabama	86
Mississippi Women	77

=== South Atlantic ===
First round - at Mount St. Mary's; Round of 24; March 11		Regional finals - at Hampton; Sweet 16; March 12
		Hampton	81
Johnson C. Smith	59	Mount St. Mary's	74
Mount St. Mary's	77

=== South Central ===
First round - at Air Force; Round of 24; March 11		Regional finals - at Central Missouri State; Sweet 16; March 12
		Central Missouri State	76
Abilene Christian	82	Abilene Christian	57
Air Force	61

=== West ===
First round - at Cal Poly Pomona; Round of 24; March 11		Regional finals - at Cal Poly Pomona; Sweet 16; March 12
		Chapman	54
Cal Poly Pomona	78	Cal Poly Pomona	63
San Francisco State	39

== National Finals - Springfield, Massachusetts ==
Visiting team listed first and date March 17 in Elite Eight unless indicated

Final Four Location: Springfield Civic Center Host: Springfield College

National quarterfinals Elite Eight
S	Mercer	86
NE	Quinnipiac	76
GL	Northern Kentucky	63
SC	Central Missouri State	79
W	Cal Poly Pomona	71
NC	St. Cloud State	59
site unknown - March 16
SA	Hampton	90
E	Pace	82

National semifinals Final Four; March 22
S	Mercer	79
SC	Central Missouri State	82
W	Cal Poly Pomona	91
SA	Hampton	51

National championship March 23
SC	Central Missouri State	69
W	Cal Poly Pomona	80

== All-tournament team ==
- Vickie Mitchell, Cal Poly Pomona
- Kelley Fraser, Cal Poly Pomona
- Sheri Jennum, Cal Poly Pomona
- Rosie Jones, Central Missouri State
- Anita Meadows, Mercer

== See also ==
- 1985 NCAA Division I women's basketball tournament
- 1985 NCAA Division III women's basketball tournament
- 1985 NCAA Division II men's basketball tournament
- 1985 NAIA women's basketball tournament
