= Hampton Lady Pirates basketball =

College women's basketball team representing Hampton University

Hampton Lady Pirates
2024–25 Hampton Lady Pirates basketball team
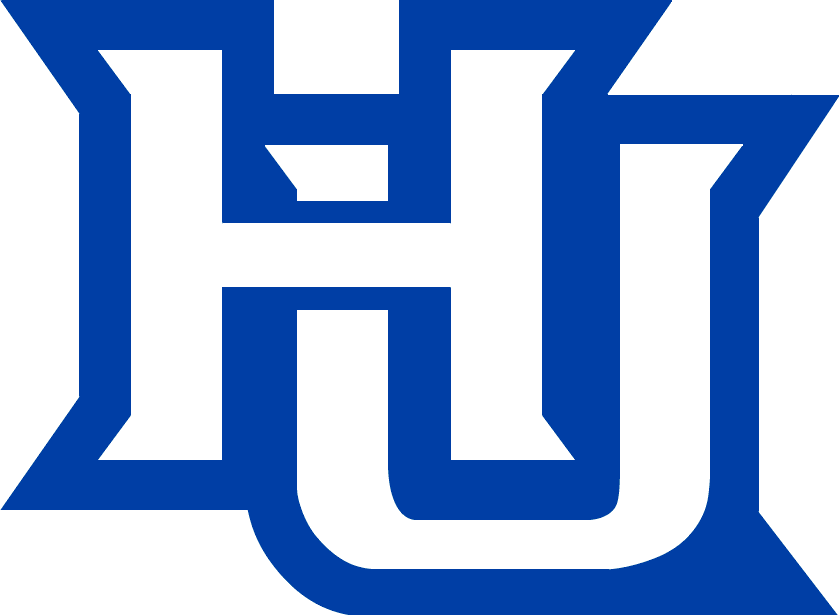
- University: Hampton University
- Head coach: Tamisha Augustin (1st season)
- Conference: Coastal Athletic Association
- Location: Hampton, Virginia
- Arena: Hampton Convocation Center (capacity: 7,200)
- Nickname: Lady Pirates
- Colors: Reflex blue and white

Uniforms
Home	Away

NCAA tournament champions
- 1988*
Other NCAA tournament results
Final Four	1988*
Elite Eight	1988*
Sweet Sixteen	1985*, 1986*, 1988*
Appearances	1985*, 1986*, 1987*, 1988*, 1989*, 1991*, 2000, 2003, 2004, 2010, 2011, 2012, 2013, 2014, 2017

Conference tournament champions
- 1985, 1987, 1994 (CIAA); 2000, 2003, 2004, 2010, 2011, 2012, 2013, 2014, 2017 (MEAC)

Conference regular-season champions
- 1985, 1986, 1987, 1988 (CIAA); 1999, 2003, 2004, 2011, 2012, 2013, 2014, 2015
- * at Division II level

The Hampton Lady Pirates basketball team is the women's basketball team that represents Hampton University in Hampton, Virginia, United States. The school's team currently competes in the Coastal Athletic Association.

== History ==
Hampton began play in 1975. They competed in the CIAA in their time in Division II, winning three tournament titles and four regular season titles, with three runner up finishes in the tournament final. They made the NCAA Division II Tournament in 1985, 1986, 1987, 1988, 1989, 1991, and 1994. They won the 1988 NCAA Division II women's basketball tournament, beating West Texas State 65–48. They joined Division I in 1995. Since joining Division I (and the MEAC), they have won conference tournament titles in 2000, 2003, 2004, 2010, 2011, 2012, 2013, 2014, 2017 (reaching the NCAA Tournament in those corresponding years) and regular season titles in 1999, 2003, 2004, 2011, 2012, 2013, 2014, and 2015. As of the end of the 2015–16 season, the Lady Pirates have an all-time record of 752–462.

== Postseason appearances ==
=== NCAA Division I tournament ===
Hampton has played in the NCAA Division I women's basketball tournament nine times. They have an 0–9 record.

Year	Seed	Round	Opponent	Result/Score
2000	#16	First Round	#1 Connecticut	L 45−116
2003	#15	First Round	#2 Texas	L 46−90
2004	#16	First Round	#1 Penn State	L 42−79
2010	#15	First Round	#2 Duke	L 37−72
2011	#13	First Round	#4 Kentucky	L 62−66 (OT)
2012	#16	First Round	#1 Stanford	L 51−73
2013	#15	First Round	#2 Duke	L 51−67
2014	#12	First Round	#5 Michigan State	L 61−91
2017	#15	First Round	#2 Duke	L 31−94

=== NCAA Division II tournament ===
Hampton had participated in six NCAA Division II women's basketball tournaments in their time in that classification. They went 10–5, with one title.

Year	Round	Opponent	Result
1985	Regional Final; National Quarterfinals; National Semifinals	Mount St. Mary's; Pace; Cal Poly-Pomona	W 81–74; W 90–82(OT); L 51–91
1986	Regional First Round; Regional Final; National Quarterfinals	Norfolk State; Mount St. Mary's; Delta State	W 73-60; W 86-83; L 61–82
1987	Regional Final; National Quarterfinals	Mount St. Mary's; New Haven	W 80–65; L 63–65
1988	Region First Round; Regional Final; National Quarterfinals; National Semifinals; National Championship	District of Columbia; Virginia State; Pittsburgh-Johnstown; North Dakota State; West Texas State	W 58–50; W 73–58; W 80–74; W 72–63; W 65–48
1989	Region First Round	Virginia State	L 88–101
1991	Region First Round	UNC–Greensboro	L 63–72

=== WNIT appearances ===
The Lady Pirates have played in the Women's National Invitation Tournament once. They have a record of 1-1.

Year	Round	Opponent	Result/Score
2015	First Round; Second Round	Drexel; West Virginia	W 45-42; L 39-57
