= Luke Yaklich =

American college basketball coach (b. 1976)

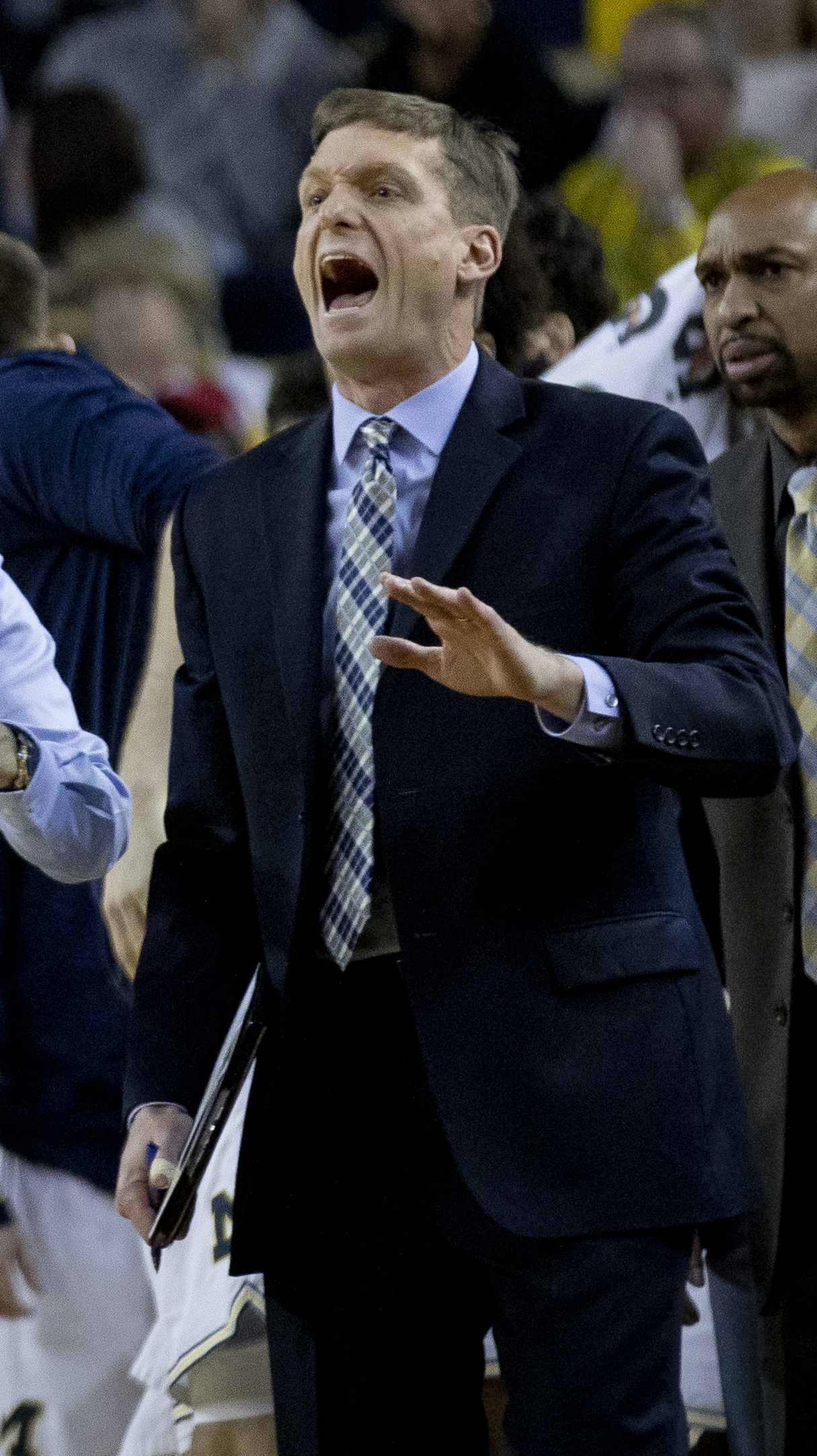

Biographical details
- Born: May 8, 1976 (age 50); LaSalle, Illinois, U.S.
- Education: Illinois State (1998); Olivet Nazarene (2004, 2009)

Coaching career (HC unless noted)
- 1999–2000: LaSalle-Peru HS (girls)
- 2000–2003: Sterling HS
- 2003–2007: LaSalle-Peru HS
- 2007–2013: Joliet West HS
- 2013–2017: Illinois State (asst.)
- 2017–2019: Michigan (asst.)
- 2019–2020: Texas (asst.)
- 2020–2024: UIC

Head coaching record
- Overall: 47–70 (college); 214–173 (high school)

Luke Yaklich (born May 8, 1976) is an American college basketball coach and former men's basketball coach for the UIC Flames.

== Early life and education ==
Yaklich is a native of LaSalle, Illinois. He graduated from LaSalle-Peru High School in 1994 after competing on the basketball team. Yaklich earned a Bachelor of Science from Illinois State University in 1998. He served as a student manager for the basketball team. He received his Master of Education from Olivet Nazarene University in 2004 and Master of Education Administration from Olivet Nazarene in 2009.

== Coaching career ==
Yaklich began his coaching career at his high school alma mater in 1999, serving for a season as the head girls coach. In 2000, he became the boys' basketball coach at Sterling High School, serving until 2003. Yaklich subsequently became the boys basketball coach at LaSalle-Peru. In 2007, he was hired at Joliet West High School. Yaklich led the 2009-10 Joliet team to a 24-8 record and the Homewood-Flossmoor Sectional Championship and earned 2010 District 9 Illinois Basketball Coaches Association (IBCA) Coach of the Year honors. In his final season at the school in 2012-13, he guided the team to an IHSA Class 4A Lockport Regional title and 19-8 record. Yaklich also served as a social studies teacher, earning teacher of the year honors at Joliet West.

Yaklich served as an assistant coach at Illinois State under Dan Muller from 2013 to 2017. He knew Muller from their time in college together at Illinois State, and he helped the team reach the NIT in 2015 and 2017. On August 4, 2017, Luke Yaklich was announced as a new assistant coach on the Michigan basketball staff. Muller recommended Yaklich for the position to Michigan's John Beilein. Yaklich served as Michigan's defensive specialist and helped the team reach the 2018 NCAA Tournament Championship game. In his two seasons on the bench, Michigan compiled a 63-15 record. In May 2019, Yaklich was hired as an assistant at Texas under Shaka Smart.

On March 24, 2020, Yaklich accepted the head coaching position at UIC. On March 10, 2024, UIC fired Yaklich.

== Personal life ==
Yaklich and his wife, Amy, have three children: Olivia, Griffin, and Taylor.

== Head coaching record ==
=== High school ===
Record table
Season	Team	Overall	Conference	Standing	Postseason
LaSalle-Peru Lady Cavaliers (North Central Illinois Conference) (1999–2000)
1999–00	LaSalle-Peru	16–11			
LaSalle-Peru HS:		16–11 (.593)			
Sterling Golden Warriors (North Central Illinois Conference) (2000–2003)
2000–01	Sterling HS	8–19			
2001–02	Sterling HS	13–14			
2002–03	Sterling HS	15–13			
Sterling HS:		36–46 (.439)			
LaSalle-Peru Cavaliers (North Central Illinois Conference) (2003–2007)
2003–04	LaSalle-Peru HS	8–18			
2004–05	LaSalle-Peru HS	14–14			
2005–06	LaSalle-Peru HS	18–12			
2006–07	LaSalle-Peru HS	18–10			
LaSalle-Peru HS:		58–54 (.518)			
Joliet West Tigers (Southwest Suburban Conference) (2007–2013)
2007–08	Joliet West HS	16–12			
2008–09	Joliet West HS	19–8			
2009–10	Joliet West HS	24–8			
2010–11	Joliet West HS	9–16			
2011–12	Joliet West HS	17–10			
2012–13	Joliet West HS	19–8			
Joliet West HS:		104–62 (.627)			
Total:		214–173 (.553)			

=== College ===
Record table
Season	Team	Overall	Conference	Standing	Postseason
UIC Flames (Horizon League) (2020–2022)
2020–21	UIC	9–13	6–10	11th	
2021–22	UIC	14–16	9–10	8th	
UIC Flames (Missouri Valley Conference) (2022–2024)
2022–23	UIC	12–20	4–16	11th	
2023–24	UIC	12–21	4–16	11th	
UIC:		47–70 (.402)	23–52 (.307)		
Total:		47–70 (.402)			
