= 1985 NAIA women's basketball tournament =

Women's basketball competition

- Teams: 16
- Finals site: , Cedar Rapids, Iowa
- Champions: SW Oklahoma State (3rd title, 3rd title game, 3rd Fab Four)
- Runner-up: Saginaw Valley (1st title game, 2nd Fab Four)
- Semifinalists: Wayland Baptist (1st Fab Four); Midland Lutheran (1st Fab Four)
- Coach of the year: John Loftin (SW Oklahoma State)
- Charles Stevenson Hustle Award: Carmen Wynn (Wayland Baptist)
- Chuck Taylor MVP: Kelli Litsch (SW Oklahoma State)
- Top scorer: Kelli Litsch (SW Oklahoma State) (82 points)

The 1985 NAIA women's basketball tournament was the fifth annual tournament held by the NAIA to determine the national champion of women's college basketball among its members in the United States and Canada.

Southwestern Oklahoma State defeated Saginaw Valley in the championship game, 55–54, to claim the Bulldogs' third NAIA national title.

The tournament was played in Cedar Rapids, Iowa.

== Qualification ==
The tournament field remained fixed at sixteen teams, with seeds assigned to the top eight teams.

The tournament utilized a simple single-elimination format, with an additional third-place game for the two teams that lost in the semifinals.

== Bracket ==
Round of 16
1 | SW Oklahoma State | 68
Southern Maine | 49
Pembroke State | 68
8 | UMKC | 72
5 | Carson-Newman | 71
Wisconsin–Milwaukee | 68
St. Mary's (CA) | 58
4 | Wayland Baptist | 68
3 | Saginaw Valley | 69
Bluefield State | 54
Northeastern Illinois | 69
6 | Louisiana College | 49
7 | Claflin | 80
Midland Lutheran | 82
2 | Portland | 79
Indiana Tech | 59

Quarterfinals
1 | SW Oklahoma State | 65
8 | UMKC | 60
5 | Carson-Newman | 51
4 | Wayland Baptist | 54
3 | Saginaw Valley | 82
Northeastern Illinois | 62
Midland Lutheran | 67
2 | Portland | 64

Semifinals
1 | SW Oklahoma State | 63
4 | Wayland Baptist | 49
3 | Saginaw Valley | 71
Midland Lutheran | 33

National championship
1 | SW Oklahoma State | 55
3 | Saginaw Valley | 54
National third place
4 | Wayland Baptist | 70
Midland Lutheran | 64

== See also ==
- 1985 NCAA Division I women's basketball tournament
- 1985 NCAA Division II women's basketball tournament
- 1985 NCAA Division III women's basketball tournament
- 1985 NAIA men's basketball tournament
