= Jacksonville State Gamecocks men's basketball =

Men's basketball team that represents Jacksonville State University

| 2026–27 Jacksonville State Gamecocks men's basketball team |
- University: Jacksonville State University
- Head coach: Ray Harper (11th season)
- Location: Jacksonville, Alabama
- Arena: Pete Mathews Coliseum (capacity: 3,500)
- Conference: Conference USA
- Nickname: Gamecocks
- Colors: Red and white

NCAA Division I tournament champions
- 1985*
Other NCAA Division I tournament results
| Final Four | 1985*, 1989* |
| Elite Eight | 1983*, 1985*, 1989*, 1990*, 1992* |
| Sweet Sixteen | 1983*, 1984*, 1985*, 1989*, 1990*, 1992* |
| Appearances | 1980*, 1981*, 1983*, 1984*, 1985*, 1989*, 1990*, 1992*, 2017, 2022 |

Conference tournament champions
- OVC: 2017; Gulf South: 1983, 1985, 1989, 1992

Conference regular-season champions
- ASUN: 2022

Conference division champions
- ASUN: 2022

Uniforms
| Home | Away |
- * at Division II level

The Jacksonville State Gamecocks men's basketball team is the men's basketball team that represents Jacksonville State University in Jacksonville, Alabama. JSU is a member of Conference USA. The Gamecocks are coached by Ray Harper. During their time as a member of Division II, they were national champions in 1985.

The Gamecocks have appeared in the NCAA tournament two times, most recently in 2022. Jacksonville State has never won a game in the NCAA tournament.

== Seasons ==
=== NCAA Division I ===
Jacksonville State's records season-by-season since joining Division I in 1995.

| Season | Head Coach | Overall Record | Conference Record | Standing | Postseason |
|---|---|---|---|---|---|
Atlantic Sun Conference (ASUN)
| 1995–96 | Bill Jones | 10–17 | 4–12 | 6th West (11th overall) | – |
| 1996–97 | Bill Jones | 10–17 | 9–7 | 2nd West (5th overall) | – |
| 1997–98 | Bill Jones | 12–14 | 6–10 | 4th West (8th overall) | – |
| 1998–99 | Mark Turgeon | 8–18 | 3–13 | T–10th | – |
| 1999–2000 | Mark Turgeon | 17–11 | 12–6 | T–3rd | – |
| 2000–01 | Mike LaPlante | 9–19 | 3–13 | 7th | – |
| 2001–02 | Mike LaPlante | 13–16 | 8–12 | T–7th | – |
| 2002–03 | Mike LaPlante | 20–10 | 10–6 | 2nd North (5th overall) | – |
Ohio Valley Conference (OVC)
| 2003–04 | Mike LaPlante | 14–14 | 7–9 | T–5th | – |
| 2004–05 | Mike LaPlante | 7–22 | 2–14 | 11th | – |
| 2005–06 | Mike LaPlante | 16–13 | 12–8 | 4th | – |
| 2006–07 | Mike LaPlante | 9–21 | 7–13 | 9th | – |
| 2007–08 | Mike LaPlante | 7–22 | 5–15 | 11th | – |
| 2008–09 | James Green | 11–17 | 5–14 | 9th | – |
| 2009–10 | James Green | 11–19 | 7–11 | 7th | – |
| 2010–11 | James Green | 5–25 | 3–15 | 10th | – |
| 2011–12 | James Green | 15–18 | 8–8 | T–6th | – |
| 2012–13 | James Green | 17–11 | 8–8 | T–4th East (T–5th overall) | – |
| 2013–14 | James Green | 10–21 | 4–12 | T–5th East (T–11th overall) | – |
| 2014–15 | James Green | 12–19 | 5–11 | 4th East (9th overall) | – |
| 2015–16 | James Green | 8–23 | 4–12 | 6th East (10th overall) | – |
| 2016–17 | Ray Harper | 20–14 | 9–7 | 3rd East (T–4th overall) | OVC Tournament Champion; NCAA Tournament |
| 2017–18 | Ray Harper | 23–12 | 11–7 | 4th | CBI Semifinal |
| 2018–19 | Ray Harper | 24–9 | 15–3 | 3rd | – |
| 2019–20 | Ray Harper | 13–19 | 8–10 | 7th | – |
| 2020–21 | Ray Harper | 18–9 | 13–6 | 4th | – |
Atlantic Sun Conference (ASUN)
| 2021–22 | Ray Harper | 21–11 | 13–3 | 1st West (1st overall) | ASUN West Division Champion; ASUN Regular Season Champion; NCAA Tournament |
| 2022–23 | Ray Harper | 13–18 | 6–12 | T–11th | – |
Conference USA (C-USA)
| 2023–24 | Ray Harper | 14–18 | 6–10 | 8th | – |
| 2024–25 | Ray Harper | 23–13 | 12–6 | T–2nd | NIT Tournament |

== Postseason ==
=== NCAA Division I tournament results ===
The Gamecocks have appeared in the NCAA Division I tournament two times. Their record is 0–2. Due to Bellarmine winning the 2022 ASUN tournament and still being in transition to Division I, Jacksonville State received the automatic bid to the NCAA tournament as regular season champion.

| Year | Seed | Round | Opponent | Result |
|---|---|---|---|---|
| 2017 | #15 | First Round | vs #2 Louisville | L 63–78 |
| 2022 | #15 | First Round | vs #2 Auburn | L 61–80 |

=== NCAA Division II tournament results ===
The Gamecocks have appeared in the NCAA Division II tournament eight times. Their combined record is 17–8. They were National Champions in 1985.

| Year | Round | Opponent | Result |
|---|---|---|---|
| 1980 | Regional semifinals Regional 3rd-place game | Northwest Missouri State; Central Missouri State | W 78–75; L 72–79 |
| 1981 | Regional semifinals Regional 3rd-place game | Northeast Missouri State; Lincoln (MO) | L 78–82; W 84–66 |
| 1983 | Regional semifinals Regional Finals; Elite Eight | Florida Southern; West Georgia; Morningside | W 67–61; W 92–76; L 90–91 |
| 1984 | Regional semifinals Regional Finals | Northwest Missouri State; Central Missouri State | W 78–75; L 72–79 |
| 1985 | Regional semifinals Regional Finals; Elite Eight; Final Four; National Championship Game | Albany State; Tampa; Southeast Missouri State; Kentucky Wesleyan; South Dakota State | W 120–84; W 76–61; W 80–79; W 72–61; W 74–73 |
| 1989 | Regional semifinals Regional Finals; Elite Eight; Final Four; National 3rd-place game | Florida Tech; Tampa; Kentucky Wesleyan; North Carolina Central; UC Riverside | W 94–70; W 89–67; W 107–70; L 70–90; L 81–90 |
| 1990 | Regional semifinals Regional Finals; Elite Eight | Florida Southern; North Carolina Central; North Dakota | W 97–96 ^{OT} W 96–95 ^{OT} L 67–89 |
| 1992 | Regional semifinals Regional Finals; Elite Eight | Troy State; USC Upstate; Cal State Bakersfield | W 96–91; W 105–87; L 59–89 |

=== NIT results ===
The Gamecocks have appeared in the National Invitation Tournament (NIT) one time. Their record is 1–1.

| Year | Round | Opponent | Result |
|---|---|---|---|
| 2025 | First Round; Second Round | at Georgia Tech at UC Irvine | W 81–64; L 61–66 |

=== CBI results ===
They Gamecocks have appeared in the College Basketball Invitational (CBI) one time. Their record is 2–1.

| Year | Round | Opponent | Result |
|---|---|---|---|
| 2018 | First Round; Quarterfinal; Semifinal | at Canisius at Central Arkansas at North Texas | W 80–78 ^{OT} W 80–59; L 68–90 |

== Gamecocks in international leagues ==
- Mohamed Abu Arisha (born 1997), Israeli basketball player for Hapoel Be'er Sheva of the Israeli Basketball Premier League and the Israel national basketball team
- Christian Cunningham (born 1997), basketball player in the Israeli Basketball Premier League
- Norbertas Giga (born 1995), basketball player in the Lithuanian Basketball League
