= 1985 NCAA Division III men's basketball tournament =

American collegiate men's basketball tournament (1985)

- Teams: 32
- Finals site: , Grand Rapids, Michigan
- Champions: North Park Vikings (4th title)
- Runner-up: Potsdam State Bears (4th title game)
- Semifinalists: Nebraska Wesleyan Prairie Wolves (1st Final Four); Widener Pride (1st Final Four)
- Winning coach: Bosco Djurickovic (NPC)
- MOP: Earnest Hubbard (NPC)
- Attendance: 31,746

The 1985 NCAA Division III men's basketball tournament was the 11th annual single-elimination tournament to determine the national champions of National Collegiate Athletic Association (NCAA) men's Division III collegiate basketball in the United States.

Held during March 1985, the field included 32 teams and the final championship rounds were contested at Calvin College in Grand Rapids, Michigan.

North Park defeated SUNY Potsdam, 72–71, to claim their fourth NCAA Division III national title.

== Tournament bracket ==
=== Regionals ===
First round
Clark (MA)	88
Westfield State	78
WPI	58*
Albany (NY)	57

Regional Championship
Clark (MA)	62
WPI	67
Regional Third-place
Westfield State	70
Albany (NY)	78

First round
Widener	54
Lycoming	52
Scranton	85
Washington & Jefferson	74

Regional Championship
Widener	55*
Scranton	53
Regional Third-place
Lycoming	102**
Washington & Jefferson	92

First round
William Paterson	71*
Roanoke	68
Trenton State	75
Salisbury State	62

Regional Championship
William Paterson	59
Trenton State	48
Regional Third-place
Roanoke	83
Salisbury State	98

First round
Buffalo State	76
Alfred	68
Potsdam State	63
Hartwick	62

Regional Championship
Buffalo State	56
Potsdam State	69
Regional Third-place
Alfred	47
Hartwick	52

First round
Wittenberg	70
DePauw	62
Hope	78
Otterbein	71

Regional Championship
Wittenberg	68
Hope	63
Regional Third-place
DePauw	78
Otterbein	79

First round
North Park	95
Monmouth (IL)	55
Wisconsin–Whitewater	72
North Central (IL)	53

Regional Championship
North Park	83*
Wisconsin–Whitewater	81
Regional Third-place
Monmouth (IL)	69
North Central (IL)	60

First round
Nebraska Wesleyan	74
Saint John's (MN)	56
Central (IA)	72
Redlands	64

Regional Championship
Nebraska Wesleyan	76
Central (IA)	54
Regional Third-place
Saint John's (MN)	70
Redlands	80

First round
Centre (KY)	66
Greensboro	52
LeMoyne-Owen	74
Augsburg	55

Regional Championship
Centre (KY)	91
LeMoyne-Owen	72
Regional Third-place
Greensboro	83
Augsburg	69

=== National finals ===
National quarterfinals
WPI	38
Widener	41
William Paterson	59
Potsdam State	76
Wittenberg	71
North Park	73
Nebraska Wesleyan	69
Centre (KY)	62

National semifinals
Widener	38
Potsdam State	54
North Park	85
Nebraska Wesleyan	80

National championship
Potsdam State	71
North Park	72
National third-place game
Widener	44
Nebraska Wesleyan	48

== See also ==
- 1985 NCAA Division I men's basketball tournament
- 1985 NCAA Division II men's basketball tournament
- 1985 NCAA Division III women's basketball tournament
- 1985 NAIA men's basketball tournament
