= Bill Jones (basketball, born 1944) =

American basketball coach

Biographical details
- Born: September 4, 1944 (age 82)

Playing career
- 1964–1966: Jacksonville State
- Position: Small forward

Coaching career (HC unless noted)
- 1972–1974: North Alabama
- 1974–1998: Jacksonville State

Head coaching record
- Overall: 477–226 (.679)

Accomplishments and honors

Championships
- NCAA Division II (1985); 6× Gulf South (1975, 1980, 1985, 1989, 1990, 1992)

Awards
- 2× all-conference (1965, 1966); NCAA All-American (1966)

William Edwin Jones (born September 4, 1944) is an American retired college basketball head coach. He guided the Jacksonville State University men's basketball team to the 1985 NCAA Division II national championship. That year, the Gamecocks lost their first game of the season but then went on to win 31 consecutive games to claim the national title. They went 16–0 in Gulf South Conference play en route to the school-record 31–1 mark. In his career at Jacksonville State, he guided them to 8 NCAA Division II Tournament appearances and 6 Gulf South championships. Jones oversaw the program's transition from Division II to Division I in the 1995–96 season when they joined the Trans America Athletic Conference.

Jones also played for Jacksonville State, earning varsity letters in 1964–65 and 1965–66. As a senior in 1965–66 he earned All-American status.
