= 1985 NAIA men's basketball tournament =

College basketball tournament

- Teams: 32
- Finals site: Kemper Arena, Kansas City, Missouri
- Champions: Fort Hays State (2 title, 2 title game, 5 Fab Four)
- Runner-up: Wayland Baptist (TX) (1 title game, 1 Fab Four)
- Semifinalists: Marycrest (IA) (1 Final Four); Central Washington (4 Final Four)
- Charles Stevenson Hustle Award: Gerry Smith (Marycrest (IA))
- Chuck Taylor MVP: Edgar Eason (Fort Hays State)

The 1985 NAIA men's basketball tournament was held in March at Kemper Arena in Kansas City, Missouri. The 48th annual NAIA basketball tournament featured 32 teams playing in a single-elimination format. Fort Hays State won the tournament and with it its second NAIA title.

== Awards and honors ==
- Leading scorers:
- Leading rebounder Darryl Smith marycrest college:
- Player of the Year: est. 1994.

== Bracket ==
First round	Second round
1	Fort Hays State	80
Rocky Mountain	67
1	Fort Hays State	55
David Lipscomb	48
David Lipscomb	68
16	William Carey	66
TOP TIER
Athens State (Ala.)	64
9	College of Idaho	59
Athens State	77
8	Georgia Southwestern	73
8	Georgia Southwestern	89
Hendrix	80
Minnesota Duluth	43
5	Biola	40
Minnesota Duluth	57
Central Washington	58
Central Washington	82
12	Hawaii Pacific	79
TOP TIER
13	Rio Grande (OH)	89
Berea	86
13	Rio Grande	68
4	West Virginia Wesleyan	84
Quincy	59
4	West Virginia Wesleyan	79
3	College of Charleston	68
Castleton State	52
3	College of Charleston	60
14	Southeastern Oklahoma State	43
Kearney State	67
14	Southeastern Oklahoma State	70
BOTTOM TIER
11	Wayland Baptist	78
Colorado Mesa	70
11	Wayland Baptist	90
Hillsdale	63
Hillsdale	92
6	St. Thomas Aquinas	79
Cabrini	70
7	Marycrest	71
7	Marycrest	83
Pfeiffer	75
10	Southwestern (TX)	59
Pfeiffer	74
BOTTOM TIER
15	Waynesburg	57
Drury	66
Drury	58
2	Wisconsin–Stevens Point	56
IUPUI	61
2	Wisconsin–Stevens Point	71

Elite Eight
1	Fort Hays State	67
Athens State	63
Central Washington	64
4	West Virginia Wesleyan	63
11	Wayland Baptist	73
3	College of Charleston	68
7	Marycrest	78
Drury	68

NAIA national semifinals
1	Fort Hays State	65
Central Washington	64
11	Wayland Baptist	70
7	Marycrest	69

NAIA national championship
1	Fort Hays State	82
11	Wayland Baptist	80*
NAIA third-place game
7	Marycrest	108
Central Washington	94

- * denotes overtime.

== See also ==
- 1985 NCAA Division I men's basketball tournament
- 1985 NCAA Division II men's basketball tournament
- 1985 NCAA Division III men's basketball tournament
- 1985 NAIA women's basketball tournament
