= Mike LaPlante =

American college basketball coach (born 1966)

Biographical details
- Born: October 27, 1966 (age 60); Holyoke, Massachusetts, U.S.

Playing career
- 1985–1989: Maine

Coaching career (HC unless noted)
- 1989–1991: Yale (assistant)
- 1991–1996: Maine (assistant)
- 1996–2000: Auburn (assistant)
- 2000–2008: Jacksonville State

Head coaching record
- Overall: 95–137

Michael McCormick LaPlante (born October 27, 1966) is an American college basketball coach, who coached Jacksonville State University for eight seasons. Before becoming the head men's basketball coach at JSU, LaPlante served as an assistant coach at Auburn, Maine and Yale. LaPlante also worked as a consultant to the Senegalese Basketball Federation.

== Coaching career ==
LaPlante's first coaching opportunity was as an assistant to Dick Kuchen at Yale. While at Yale the Bulldogs set modern era records for most wins (19).

As an assistant to Rudy Keeling at the University of Maine, LaPlante quickly established himself as an excellent recruiter and on the floor coach. During his tenure at Maine the Black Bears set school records for most wins in a season (20), reaching the 20 win plateau for the first time in school history. It was during this time that LaPlante established a relationship with the Senegalese Basketball Federation as a consultant that has led to his strong connection with that country's basketball development.

LaPlante served as an assistant coach to Cliff Ellis at Auburn from 1996 to 2000. While at Auburn the program set new records for most wins in a season (29), most wins in a two-year period (54), and captured the school's first Southeastern Conference (SEC) basketball championship in over 40 years. LaPlante quickly established himself as one of the top recruiters in the country by helping Auburn to four Top 20 recruiting classes. He was then named head coach for the Jacksonville State Gamecocks.

During his tenure at JSU LaPlante set Division I school records for most wins in a career (95), most wins in a season (20), most wins in a two-year period (34), and most wins in a three-year period (47). LaPlante was fired on March 3, 2008 after amassing a 22–84 record in road games during his eight-year tenure.

== Post-coaching career ==
Following his dismissal from Jacksonville State, LaPlante received his J.D. from the Birmingham School of Law and became an attorney in Anniston, Alabama.

== Head coaching record ==
Record table
Season	Team	Overall	Conference	Standing	Postseason
Jacksonville State Gamecocks (Atlantic Sun Conference) (2000–2003)
2000–01	Jacksonville State	9–19	3–13	7th	
2001–02	Jacksonville State	13–16	8–12	T–7th	
2002–03	Jacksonville State	20–10	10–6	2nd (North)	
Jacksonville State Gamecocks (Ohio Valley Conference) (2003–2008)
2003–04	Jacksonville State	14–14	7–9	T–5th	
2004–05	Jacksonville State	7–22	2–14	11th	
2005–06	Jacksonville State	16–13	12–8	4th	
2006–07	Jacksonville State	9–21	7–13	9th	
2007–08	Jacksonville State	7–22	5–15	11th	
Jacksonville State:		95–137 (.409)	54–90 (.375)		
Total:		95–137 (.409)			
National champion Postseason invitational champion Conference regular season champion Conference regular season and conference tournament champion Division regular season champion Division regular season and conference tournament champion Conference tournament champion
