= Dan Muller (basketball) =

American college basketball coach (born 1976)

Biographical details
- Born: February 21, 1976 (age 50); Lafayette, Indiana, U.S.

Playing career
- 1994–1998: Illinois State
- 1999: Team La Rioja Andino
- 2000: Siemens Ghent

Coaching career (HC unless noted)
- 2001–2012: Vanderbilt (assistant)
- 2012–2022: Illinois State

Head coaching record
- Overall: 167–150 (.527)
- Tournaments: 2–2 (NIT); 2–1 (CBI)

Accomplishments and honors

Championships
- MVC regular season (2017)

Awards
- MVC Freshman of the Year (1995); 2× MVC Defensive Player of the Year (1996, 1997); MVC tournament MOP (1998); MVC Coach of the Year (2017)

Daniel Paul Muller (born February 21, 1976) is an American college basketball coach, formerly the men's basketball head coach at his alma mater Illinois State University.

== Biography ==
Muller was born in Lafayette, Indiana to parents Cliff and Tricia. He attended Lafayette Central Catholic High School, graduating in 1994.

After high school, Muller attended Illinois State University. On the Illinois State Redbirds men's basketball team, Muller played as a forward from 1994 to 1998 under head coach Kevin Stallings. In his sophomore season, the team finished second in the MVC regular season, and fell to Tulsa in the semifinals of the conference tournament. They earned a bid to the National Invitation Tournament (NIT), where they advanced to the quarterfinals before falling to Tulane. During Muller's final two seasons, the Redbirds won back-to-back MVC regular-season and tournament titles, appearing in the 1997 and 1998 NCAA Division I Tournaments. In the 1998 tournament, Muller scored the game-winning basket in a first round overtime win against Tennessee.

Muller finished his career with 1,445 points and made 128 consecutive starts, which remains a school record. He was a two-time Missouri Valley Conference Defensive Player of the Year (1996 & 1997) and earned the MVC Tournament MOP in his senior season (1998). Muller also excelled academically, becoming a Bone Scholar (ISU's highest academic honor) and a two-time GTE Academic All-American. He graduated in 1998 with a bachelor's degree in organizational leadership.

After college, Muller played basketball internationally for two seasons: in Argentina (1999) for Team La Rioja Andino, and Belgium (2000) for Siemens Ghent.

In 2001, Muller was hired by his former ISU coach Kevin Stallings as an assistant at Vanderbilt University. He spent 12 years with the Commodores, helping lead the program to seven 20-win seasons and six NCAA tournament appearances. In 2006, he also took over as Vanderbilt's recruiting coordinator, and built some of the highest-rated recruiting classes in school history.

In 2012, Muller was hired as the head coach at his alma mater, Illinois State. In his first season, the team posted a 18–15 record and finished 6th in the MVC standings. In 2013-14, they earned a bid to the College Basketball Invitational (CBI), where they advanced to the semifinals before losing to Siena. During the 2014-15 season, the Redbirds finished with a 22–13 record, and made it to the second round of the NIT tournament. Muller's most successful season with the team came in 2016–17, as they went nearly undefeated in conference play (17–1) and finished with a school-record 28 wins (28–7). However, they were unable to secure an automatic NCAA tournament bid, as they fell to No. 21 Wichita State in the MVC Tournament Final. Muller was named MVC Coach of the Year following the season.

In April 2018, Muller agreed to a 5–year contract extension to remain as head coach of the Redbirds. Despite the extension, the team was unable to sustain their previous success under Muller, as they suffered consecutive losing seasons in 2019–20 and 2020–21 for the first time since 2005–06 and 2006–07. He returned for the 2021–22 season, but the Redbirds struggled to a 11–15 overall record and 4–9 mark in MVC play by mid-February.

On February 13, 2022, ISU announced that Muller would be dismissed as head coach following the season, but that he would stay in his position for the remainder of the 2021–22 season at his players' request. However, the next day, he announced that he was stepping down effective immediately, as he was concerned his presence with the team would become a distraction. Muller received a $1 million buyout for the remaining two years on his contract. Following his departure, associate head coach Brian Jones was named as the interim HC for the rest of the season.

In July, 2022 he started Dan Muller Executive Coaching.

Beginning with the 2023–24 season, he commenced working as a basketball analyst for the Missouri Valley Conference Television Network.

== Head coaching record ==
Record table
Season	Team	Overall	Conference	Standing	Postseason
Illinois State Redbirds (Missouri Valley Conference) (2012–2022)
2012–13	Illinois State	18–15	8–10	6th	
2013–14	Illinois State	18–16	9–9	5th	CBI Semifinal
2014–15	Illinois State	22–13	11–7	T–3rd	NIT Second Round
2015–16	Illinois State	18–14	12–6	T–2nd	
2016–17	Illinois State	28–7	17–1	T–1st	NIT Second Round
2017–18	Illinois State	18–15	10–8	T–3rd	
2018–19	Illinois State	17–16	9–9	T–5th	
2019–20	Illinois State	10–21	5–13	9th	
2020–21	Illinois State	7–18	4–14	10th	
2021–22	Illinois State	11–15	4–9	T–7th *	
Illinois State:		167–150 (.527)	89–86 (.509)		
Total:		167–150 (.527)	89–86 (.509)		
National champion Postseason invitational champion Conference regular season champion Conference regular season and conference tournament champion Division regular season champion Division regular season and conference tournament champion Conference tournament champion

* at time of departure
