= 1985 NCAA Division II men's basketball tournament =

- Teams: 32
- Finals site: , Springfield, Massachusetts
- Champions: Jacksonville State Gamecocks (1st title)
- Runner-up: South Dakota State Jackrabbits (2nd title game)
- Semifinalists: Kentucky Wesleyan Panthers (11th Final Four); Mount St. Mary's Mountaineers (5th Final Four)
- Winning coach: Bill Jones (2nd title)
- MOP: Mark Tetzlaff (South Dakota State)
- Attendance: 70,945

The 1985 NCAA Division II men's basketball tournament involved 32 schools playing in a single-elimination tournament to determine the national champion of men's NCAA Division II college basketball as a culmination of the 1984–85 NCAA Division II men's basketball season. It was won by Jacksonville State University and South Dakota State's Mark Tetzlaff was the Most Outstanding Player.

1985 NCAA Division II Men's sites - regionals (cyan) Quarterfinals (orange) Final Four (red)

== Regional participants ==
School	Outcome
Kentucky Wesleyan	Regional Champion
Lewis	Fourth Place
Indiana State–Evansville	Third Place
Wright State	Runner-up

School	Outcome
American International	Regional Champion
Bentley	Fourth Place
Bridgeport	Third Place
Sacred Heart	Runner-up

School	Outcome
Alabama A&M	Fourth Place
Central Missouri State	Third Place
Delta State	Runner-up
SE Missouri State	Regional Champion

School	Outcome
Albany State	Fourth Place
Florida Southern	Third Place
Jacksonville State	Regional Champion
Tampa	Runner-up

School	Outcome
Gannon	Fourth Place
Grand Valley State	Runner-up
Northern Michigan	Third Place
South Dakota State	Regional Champion

School	Outcome
Cal State Hayward	Regional Champion
Cal State Northridge	Runner-up
Eastern Montana	Fourth Place
Norfolk State	Third Place

School	Outcome
Mount St. Mary's	Regional Champion
Randolph–Macon	Fourth Place
Virginia Union	Third Place
Winston-Salem State	Runner-up

School	Outcome
California (PA)	Fourth Place
C.W. Post	Regional Champion
Millersville	Third Place
Philadelphia U	Runner-up

*denotes tie

== Regionals ==
=== Great Lakes - Owensboro, Kentucky ===
Location: Owensboro Sportscenter Host: Kentucky Wesleyan College

Regional semifinals Round of 32; March 9
Wright State	61
Lewis	53
Kentucky Wesleyan	77
Indiana State–Evansville	64

Regional final Sweet 16; March 10
Wright State	72
Kentucky Wesleyan	84

- Third Place - Indiana State–Evansville 92, Lewis 78

=== New England - Springfield, Massachusetts ===
Location: Butova Gymnasium Host: American International College

Regional semifinals Round of 32; March 8
Sacred Heart	47
Bridgeport	45
American International	65
Bentley	49

Regional final Sweet 16; March 9
Sacred Heart	74
American International	80

- Third Place - Bridgeport 83, Bentley 67

=== South Central - Warrensburg, Missouri ===
Location: CMSU Fieldhouse Host: Central Missouri State University

Regional semifinals Round of 32; March 7
SE Missouri State	85
Alabama A&M	74
Delta State	52
Central Missouri State	47

Regional final Sweet 16; March 8
SE Missouri State	67
Delta State	59

- Third Place - Central Missouri State 88, Alabama A&M 74

=== South - Jacksonville, Alabama ===
Location: Pete Mathews Coliseum Host: Jacksonville State University

Regional semifinals Round of 32; March 7
Tampa	79
Florida Southern	65
Jacksonville State	120
Albany State	84

Regional final Sweet 16; March 8
Tampa	61
Jacksonville State	76

- Third Place - Florida Southern 108, Albany State 80

=== North Central - Brookings, South Dakota ===
Location: Frost Arena Host: South Dakota State University

Regional semifinals Round of 32; March 8
Grand Valley State	71
Northern Michigan	70
South Dakota State	73
Gannon	64

Regional final Sweet 16; March 9
Grand Valley State	57
South Dakota State	58

- Third Place - Northern Michigan 95, Gannon 65

=== West - Billings, Montana ===
Location: Alterowitz Gym Host: Eastern Montana College

Regional semifinals Round of 32; March 8
Cal State Hayward	64
Norfolk State	61
Cal State Northridge	70
Eastern Montana	59

Regional final Sweet 16; March 9
Cal State Hayward	51
Cal State Northridge	48

- Third Place - Norfolk State 90, Eastern Montana 78

=== South Atlantic - Richmond, Virginia ===
Location: Arthur Ashe, Jr. Athletic Center Host: Virginia Union University

Regional semifinals Round of 32; March 8
Mount St. Mary's	62***
Randolph–Macon	52
Winston-Salem State	44
Virginia Union	42

Regional final Sweet 16; March 9
Mount St. Mary's	63
Winston-Salem State	56

- Third Place - Virginia Union 78, Randolph–Macon 55

=== East - Millersville, Pennsylvania ===
Location: Pucillo Gymnasium Host: Millersville University of Pennsylvania

Regional semifinals Round of 32; March 7
Philadelphia U	95
California (PA)	76
C. W. Post	57
Millersville	55

Regional final Sweet 16; March 8
Philadelphia U	68
C. W. Post	71

- Third Place - Millersville 96, California 86

*denotes each overtime played

== National Quarterfinals ==
Quarterfinal - Springfield, MA; Elite Eight; March 16
Kentucky Wesleyan	76
American International	73

Quarterfinal - Cape Girardeau, MO; Elite Eight; March 16
SE Missouri State	79
Jacksonville State	80

Quarterfinal - Brookings, SD; Elite Eight; March 16
South Dakota State	62
Cal State Hayward	58

Quarterfinal - Emmitsburg, MD; Elite Eight; March 15
Mount St. Mary's	69
C. W. Post	67

== National Finals - Springfield, Massachusetts ==
Location: Springfield Civic Center Hosts: American International College and Springfield College

National semifinals Final Four; March 22
Kentucky Wesleyan	61
Jacksonville State	72
South Dakota State	78
Mount St. Mary's	71

National championship March 23
Jacksonville State	74
South Dakota State	73

*denotes each overtime played

== All-tournament team ==
- Melvin Allen (Jacksonville State)
- Dave Bennett (Kentucky Wesleyan)
- Darryle Edwards (Mount Saint Mary's)
- Robert Spurgeon (Jacksonville State)
- Mark Tetzlaff (South Dakota State)

== See also ==
- 1985 NCAA Division I men's basketball tournament
- 1985 NCAA Division III men's basketball tournament
- 1985 NAIA men's basketball tournament
- 1985 NCAA Division II women's basketball tournament

== Sources ==
- 2010 NCAA Men's Basketball Championship Tournament Records and Statistics: Division II men's basketball Championship
- 1985 NCAA Division II men's basketball tournament jonfmorse.com
