= Highmark Events Center =

Basketball arena in Erie, Pennsylvania

Coordinates: 42.1282°N 80.0866°W

- "The Mill"
- Interactive map of Highmark Events Center
- Full name: Highmark Events Center
- Former names: Gannon Auditorium (1949–1983), The Hammermill (1983–2021)
- Location: 620 Peach St, Erie, Pennsylvania
- Capacity: 2,800
- Record attendance: 3,200

Construction
- Opened: 1949-50 Season

The Highmark Events Center (formerly The Hammermill, the Gannon Auditorium, and "The Audi") is a 2,800-seat basketball arena on the campus of Gannon University in Erie, Pennsylvania. Built in 1949, it is home to various Gannon athletic teams.

== History ==
The arena was opened in 1949 as the Gannon Auditorium, or "The Audi".

It was renamed the Hammermill Center in February 1983 after the Hammermill Paper Company donated money to repair and improve the arena. In February 2022, it was renamed Highmark Events Center after Highmark Health, which donated money for a $10 million renovation.

The 36,560-square-foot center is home to the university’s basketball, volleyball, wrestling, acrobatics and tumbling, and competitive cheer teams. Other events held there have included community lectures, concerts, camps, and programs.

== Attendance ==
Year	Total attendance	Avg. attendance	Conf. ranking	National ranking
2000-01^	30,988	1,823	1	30
2001-02^	33,981	2,124	1	20
2002-03^	29,525	1,845	1	27
2003-04^	31,234	1,837	1	26
2004-05^	23,615	1,574	2	NR
2005-06^	20,122	1,184	3	NR
2006-07^	17,074	1,220	2	NR
2007-08^	26,773	1,575	1	22
2008-09^^	38,583	1,754	1	24
2009-10^^	17,594	1,035	2	NR

^ Member of the Great Lakes Intercollegiate Athletic Conference (GLIAC)

^^ Member of the Pennsylvania State Athletic Conference (PSAC)
