= 2023 NCAA Division III men's basketball tournament =

American collegiate men's basketball tournament (2023)

- Teams: 64
- Finals site: Allen County War Memorial Coliseum, Fort Wayne, Indiana
- Champions: Christopher Newport (1st title, 1st title game, 3rd Final Four)
- Runner-up: Mount Union (1st title game, 1st Final Four)
- Semifinalists: UW–Whitewater (6th Final Four); Swarthmore (2nd Final Four)
- Winning coach: John Krikorian (1st title)
- MOP: Trey Barber (Christopher Newport)

The 2023 NCAA Division III men's basketball tournament was a single-elimination tournament to determine the national champion of men's NCAA Division III college basketball in the United States. Featuring sixty-four teams, it was played in March 2023, following the 2022–23 season, concluding with the championship game on March 18, 2023.

The national semifinal and championship rounds were held at the Allen County War Memorial Coliseum in Fort Wayne, Indiana. Christopher Newport won their first national championship, beating Mount Union 74–72 on a buzzer-beating layup by Trey Barber.

== Tournament schedule and venues ==
2023 first and second round host sites

First and second rounds

First- and second-round games were played at campus sites on March 3 and March 4.

On the basis of team strength and geography, these locations were chosen to host first- and second-round games in the 2023 tournament:

- Crenshaw Gymnasium, Ashland, Virginia (Host: Randolph–Macon College)
- Max Ziel Gymnasium, Oswego, New York (Host: State University of New York at Oswego)
- Horsburgh Gymnasium, Cleveland, Ohio (Host: Case Western Reserve University)
- Goldfarb Gymnasium, Baltimore, Maryland (Host: Johns Hopkins University)
- Esbjornson Gymnasium, Glassboro, New Jersey (Host: Rowan University)
- Kolf Sports Center, Oshkosh, Wisconsin (Host: University of Wisconsin–Oshkosh)
- McPherson Academic and Athletic Complex, Alliance, Ohio (Host: University of Mount Union)
- Washington University Field House, St. Louis, Missouri (Host: Washington University in St. Louis)
- Tarble Pavilion, Swarthmore, Pennsylvania (Host: Swarthmore College)
- Spaulding Gymnasium, Keene, New Hampshire (Host: Keene State College)
- Stockton University Sports Center, Galloway Township, New Jersey (Host: Stockton University)
- Pepin Gymnasium, Middlebury, Vermont (Host: Middlebury College)
- Kirby Field House, Hampden Sydney, Virginia (Host: Hampden–Sydney College)
- Mayborn Campus Center, Belton, Texas (Host: University of Mary Hardin–Baylor)
- O'Connell Athletic Center, West Hartford, Connecticut (Host: University of Saint Joseph)
- Chrouser Sports Complex, Wheaton, Illinois (Host: Wheaton College)

Third and fourth rounds

2023 third and fourth round (blue) and Final Four (red) host sites

Third- and fourth-round games were played at campus sites on March 10 and March 11.

At the conclusion of the second round, the NCAA announced the following locations would host third- and fourth-round games.

- Crenshaw Gymnasium, Ashland, Virginia (Host: Randolph–Macon College)
- McPherson Academic and Athletic Complex, Alliance, Ohio (Host: University of Mount Union)
- Tarble Pavilion, Swarthmore, Pennsylvania (Host: Swarthmore College)
- Freeman Center, Newport News, Virginia (Host: Christopher Newport University)

National Semifinals and Championship

The National Semifinals and Championship were played on March 16 and March 18.

- Allen County War Memorial Coliseum, Fort Wayne, Indiana (Host: Manchester University)

Fort Wayne hosted the Final Four for the third time, having previously hosted in 2019 and 2022. Fort Wayne was also scheduled to host the Final Four in 2020 and 2021, before those editions of the tournament were canceled due to COVID-19 concerns.

== Qualifying teams ==
A total of sixty-four bids were available for the tournament: 44 automatic bids—awarded to the champions of the forty-three NCAA-recognized Division III conference tournaments—and 20 at-large bids.

While this was the first season for the newly established Collegiate Conference of the South, its conference tournament champion was not eligible for an automatic bid until the 2025 tournament.

This was also the final year that the Colonial States Athletic Conference and New England Collegiate Conference received bids; the members of the CSAC merged into the United East Conference ahead of the 2023–24 season, consolidating its bid into the UEC's as part of the process. Meanwhile, after steady losses of membership in recent years, the four remaining members of the NECC joined other conferences for 2023–24 and beyond.

=== Automatic bids (44) ===
The following 44 teams were automatic qualifiers for the 2023 NCAA field by virtue of winning their conference's automatic bid (except for the UAA, whose regular-season champion received the automatic bid).

Automatic bids
Conference	Team	Record (Conf.)	Appearance	Last bid
Allegheny Mountain	La Roche	20–7 (13–1)	4th	2020
American Rivers	Coe	16–12 (7–9)	3rd	1976
American Southwest	East Texas Baptist	23–5 (14–4)	2nd	2015
Atlantic East	Marymount	17–10 (10–2)	2nd	2000
Centennial	Swarthmore	24–3 (16–2)	6th	2022
CUNYAC	Baruch	22–5 (12–2)	7th	2022
Coast to Coast	Christopher Newport	24–3 (5–0)	26th	2022
CCIW	North Park	22–5 (13–3)	10th	1990
Colonial States	Wilson	19–8 (11–3)	2nd	2022
Commonwealth Coast	Nichols	23–5 (16–2)	6th	2022
Empire 8	St. John Fisher	21–7 (14–4)	18th	2020
Great Northeast	Albertus Magnus	19–9 (14–4)	8th	2019
Heartland	Anderson (IN)	18–9 (14–4)	2nd	2010
Landmark	Scranton	20–7 (10–4)	29th	2017
Liberty	St. Lawrence	19–7 (13–5)	14th	2017
Little East	Keene State	26–1 (16–0)	8th	2022
MAC Commonwealth	Widener	19–8 (11–5)	17th	2009
MAC Freedom	Arcadia	15–11 (9–7)	2nd	2019
MASCAC	Worcester State	22–5 (12–0)	3rd	1994
Michigan	Hope	19–9 (10–4)	29th	2022
Midwest	Illinois College	25–2 (15–1)	2nd	2003
Minnesota	Carleton	24–3 (17–3)	3rd	2010
NECC	Mitchell	23–4 (6–0)	4th	2022
NESCAC	Hamilton	19–8 (7–3)	12th	2019
NEWMAC	Babson	19–8 (10–4)	12th	2022
New Jersey	Rowan	22–5 (16–2)	15th	2022
North Atlantic	SUNY Delhi	20–8 (10–4)	1st	Never
North Coast	Wabash	21–7 (11–5)	7th	2022
Northern Athletics	St. Norbert	19–7 (14–3)	10th	2020
Northwest	Whitworth	18–9 (11–5)	16th	2022
Ohio	Mount Union	25–2 (16–2)	5th	2022
Old Dominion	Randolph–Macon	27–1 (16–0)	19th	2022
Presidents'	Chatham	17–11 (13–7)	2nd	2019
Skyline	Farmingdale State	21–7 (13–3)	7th	2019
Southern	Sewanee	19–9 (9–5)	6th	2019
SCIAC	Cal Lutheran	13–13 (8–8)	5th	2001
SCAC	Schreiner	15–13 (6–10)	2nd	2018
SLIAC	Fontbonne	16–11 (10–4)	5th	2009
SUNYAC	Oswego State	25–2 (17–1)	8th	2022
United East	Lancaster Bible	20–7 (15–1)	3rd	2018
UAA	Case Western Reserve	21–3 (11–3)	2nd	2022
Upper Midwest	Bethany Lutheran	23–4 (12–2)	3rd	2020
USA South	North Carolina Wesleyan	23–4 (13–1)	6th	2011
Wisconsin	UW–Whitewater	21–7 (9–5)	22nd	2017

=== At-large bids (20) ===
The following 20 teams were awarded qualification for the tournament field by the NCAA Division III Men's Basketball Committee. The committee evaluated teams on the basis of their win–loss percentage, strength of schedule, head-to-head results, results against common opponents, and results against teams included in the NCAA's final regional rankings.

At-large bids
Conference	Team	Record (Conf.)	Appearance	Last bid
UAA	Emory	17–8 (8–6)	11th	2022
Old Dominion	Hampden–Sydney	21–6 (14–2)	15th	2013
Ohio	John Carroll	22–4 (16–2)	16th	2018
Centennial	Johns Hopkins	23–4 (16–2)	14th	2022
American Southwest	Mary Hardin–Baylor	21–5 (16–2)	8th	2022
Coast to Coast	Mary Washington	19–8 (4–2)	3rd	2014
NESCAC	Middlebury	19–5 (7–3)	12th	2020
New Jersey	Montclair State	22–5 (15–3)	7th	2003
UAA	NYU	18–7 (7–7)	11th	2016
SCIAC	Pomona–Pitzer	20–6 (15–1)	15th	2022
UAA	Rochester	16–9 (6–8)	18th	2022
Great Northeast	St. Joseph (CT)	27–1 (18–0)	3rd	2022
SCAC	St. Thomas (TX)	23–3 (16–0)	1st	Never
New Jersey	Stockton	22–5 (15–3)	18th	2022
NESCAC	Tufts	19–7 (6–4)	7th	2020
Empire 8	Utica	22–4 (17–1)	2nd	2006
Wisconsin	UW–Oshkosh	21–6 (13–1)	12th	2022
UAA	Washington–St. Louis	19–6 (10–4)	24th	2022
CCIW	Wheaton (IL)	22–4 (14–2)	13th	2022
NESCAC	Williams	22–4 (7–3)	19th	2022

== Tournament bracket ==
* – Denotes overtime period

=== Top-left - Ashland, Virginia ===
First round March 3, 2023; Campus Sites
Randolph–Macon	73
Wilson	36
Ashland, VA
Scranton	65
North Carolina Wesleyan	64
Oswego State	80
Marymount	62
Oswego, NY
John Carroll	91
Albertus Magnus	80
Case Western Reserve	82
Arcadia	76
Cleveland, OH
UW–Whitewater	90
Wabash	83
Johns Hopkins	89
Mitchell	71
Baltimore, MD
Hamilton	84
Montclair State	75

Second round March 4, 2023; Campus Sites
Randolph–Macon	63
Scranton	41
Oswego State	66
John Carroll	61
Case Western Reserve	75
UW–Whitewater	78
Johns Hopkins	81
Hamilton	71

Third round March 10, 2023; Ashland, VA
Randolph–Macon	63
Oswego State	74
UW–Whitewater	83*
Johns Hopkins	82

Quarterfinals; March 11, 2023; Ashland, VA
Oswego State	74
UW–Whitewater	77

=== Bottom-left - Alliance, Ohio ===
First round March 3, 2023; Campus Sites
Rowan	83
Cal Lutheran	77
Glassboro, NJ
Utica	72
Babson	60
UW–Oshkosh	86
Fontbonne	58
Oshkosh, WI
Hope	79
Bethany Lutheran	65
Mount Union	73
Anderson (IN)	65
Alliance, OH
NYU	64
Lancaster Bible	67
Washington–St. Louis	69
Coe	48
St. Louis, MO
North Park	88
Sewanee	69

Second round March 4, 2023; Campus Sites
Rowan	83
Utica	72
UW–Oshkosh	51
Hope	50
Mount Union	90
Lancaster Bible	66
Washington–St. Louis	69
North Park	72

Third round March 10, 2023; Alliance, OH
Rowan	72
UW–Oshkosh	91
Mount Union	102
North Park	85

Quarterfinals; March 11, 2023; Alliance, OH
UW–Oshkosh	67
Mount Union	78

=== Top-right - Swarthmore, Pennsylvania ===
First round March 3, 2023; Campus Sites
Swarthmore	93
SUNY Delhi	64
Swarthmore, PA
St. John Fisher	74
Whitworth	59
Keene State	89
Baruch	78
Keene, NH
Tufts	78
Widener	66
Stockton	86
La Roche	70
Galloway, NJ
Mary Washington	69
St. Lawrence	42
Middlebury	76
Worcester State	51
Middlebury, VT
Rochester	71
Nichols	74

Second round March 4, 2023; Campus Sites
Swarthmore	101
St. John Fisher	78
Keene State	77
Tufts	72
Stockton	68
Mary Washington	65
Middlebury	66
Nichols	73

Third round March 10, 2023; Swarthmore, PA
Swarthmore	82
Keene State	58
Stockton	68
Nichols	86

Quarterfinals; March 11, 2023; Swarthmore, PA
Swarthmore	78
Nichols	77

=== Bottom-right - Newport News, Virginia ===
First round March 3, 2023; Campus Sites
Christopher Newport	61
Farmingdale State	60
Hampden Sydney, VA (Note: Due to Christopher Newport's women's team hosting first and second round games in the 2023 NCAA Division III women's basketball tournament, this pod is hosted by Hampden–Sydney instead.)
Hampden–Sydney	63
Emory	59
Mary Hardin–Baylor	81
Schreiner	78
Belton, TX
St. Thomas (TX)	75
East Texas Baptist	79
St. Joseph (CT)	76
Chatham	53
West Hartford, CT
Pomona–Pitzer	53
Williams	78
Wheaton (IL)	79
Illinois College	66
Wheaton, IL
Carleton	77
St. Norbert	81

Second round March 4, 2023; Campus Sites
Christopher Newport	72
Hampden–Sydney	59
Mary Hardin–Baylor	72
East Texas Baptist	70
St. Joseph (CT)	75
Williams	54
Wheaton (IL)	75
St. Norbert	71

Third round March 10, 2023; Newport News, VA
Christopher Newport	72
Mary Hardin–Baylor	60
St. Joseph (CT)	67
Wheaton (IL)	74

Quarterfinals; March 11, 2023; Newport News, VA
Christopher Newport	76
Wheaton (IL)	70

=== Final Four ===
National semifinal March 16; Fort Wayne, IN
UW–Whitewater	79
Mount Union	83
Swarthmore	66
Christopher Newport	69

National championship March 18; Fort Wayne, IN
Mount Union	72
Christopher Newport	74

== Record by conference ==
Conference	Record	Win %	R64	R32	S16	E8	F4	CG	NC
Coast to Coast	7–1	.875	2	2	1	1	1	1	1
Ohio	6–2	.750	2	2	1	1	1	1	
Wisconsin	7–2	.778	2	2	2	2	1		
Centennial	6–2	.750	2	2	2	1	1		
Commonwealth Coast	3–1	.750	1	1	1	1			
SUNYAC	3–1	.750	1	1	1	1			
CCIW	5–2	.714	2	2	2	1			
Little East	2–1	.667	1	1	1				
American Southwest	3–2	.600	2	2	1				
Old Dominion	3–2	.600	2	2	1				
New Jersey	4–3	.571	3	2	2				
Great Northeast	2–2	.500	2	1	1				
NESCAC	4–4	.500	4	4					
Empire 8	2–2	.500	2	2					
Landmark	1–1	.500	1	1					
Michigan	1–1	.500	1	1					
Northern Athletics	1–1	.500	1	1					
United East	1–1	.500	1	1					
UAA	2–5	.286	5	2					
Southern Collegiate	0–2	.000	2						
SCIAC	0–2	.000	2						

- The R64, R32, S16, E8, F4, CG, and NC columns indicate how many teams from each conference were in the round of 64 (first round), round of 32 (second round), Sweet 16, Elite Eight, Final Four, championship game, and national champion, respectively.
- The Allegheny Mountain, American Rivers, Atlantic East, CUNYAC, Colonial States, Heartland, Liberty, MAC Commonwealth, MAC Freedom, MASCAC, Midwest, Minnesota, NECC, NEWMAC, North Atlantic, North Coast, Northwest, Presidents', Skyline, SAA, SLIAC, Upper Midwest, and USA South each had one representative, eliminated in the Round of 64 with a record of 0–1.

== See also ==
- 2023 NCAA Division I men's basketball tournament
- 2023 NCAA Division II men's basketball tournament
- 2023 NAIA men's basketball tournament
- 2023 NCAA Division III women's basketball tournament
