= 2022 NCAA Division III men's basketball tournament =

American collegiate men's basketball tournament (2022)

- Teams: 64
- Finals site: Allen County War Memorial Coliseum, Fort Wayne, Indiana
- Champions: Randolph–Macon (1st title, 1st title game, 2nd Final Four)
- Runner-up: Elmhurst (1st title game, 1st Final Four)
- Semifinalists: Marietta (1st Final Four); Wabash (2nd Final Four)
- Winning coach: Josh Merkel (1st title)
- MOP: Buzz Anthony (Randolph-Macon)

The 2022 NCAA Division III men's basketball tournament was a single-elimination tournament to determine the national champion of men's NCAA Division III college basketball in the United States. Featuring sixty-four teams, it began on March 4, 2022, following the 2021–22 season, and concluded with the championship game on March 19, 2022.

The national semifinal and championship rounds were held at the Allen County War Memorial Coliseum in Fort Wayne, Indiana. The tournament was won by the Randolph–Macon Yellow Jackets, which "repeated" as national champions. During the 2021 season, the Yellow Jackets had won a mythical national championship from polls organised by D3Sports.com and a "bowl game" style championship game against the Trine Thunder in 2021.

This was the first tournament completed since 2019 after the two previous editions (in 2020 it was unfinished while in 2021 it did not happen all together) were cancelled for separate but different reasons due to the COVID-19 pandemic.

== Tournament schedule and venues ==
2022 first and second round host sites

First and second rounds

First and second-round games were played at campus sites on March 4 and March 5.

On the basis of team strength and geography, these locations were chosen to host first and second-round games in the 2022 tournament:

- Kolf Sports Center, Oshkosh, Wisconsin (Host: University of Wisconsin–Oshkosh)
- Mayborn Campus Center, Belton, Texas (Host: University of Mary Hardin–Baylor)
- Williams Fieldhouse, Platteville, Wisconsin (Host: University of Wisconsin–Platteville)
- R.A. Fagenel Hall, Elmhurst, Illinois (Host: Elmhurst University)
- Woodruff Physical Education Center, Atlanta, Georgia (Host: Emory University)
- McPherson Academic and Athletic Complex, Alliance, Ohio (Host: University of Mount Union)
- Shirk Center, Bloomington, Illinois (Host: Illinois Wesleyan University)
- Washington University Field House, St. Louis, Missouri (Host: Washington University in St. Louis)
- Ban Johnson Arena, Marietta, Ohio (Host: Marietta College)
- Tarble Pavilion, Swarthmore, Pennsylvania (Host: Swarthmore College)
- Freeman Center, Newport News, Virginia (Host: Christopher Newport University)
- Stockton University Sports Center, Galloway Township, New Jersey (Host: Stockton University)
- Crenshaw Gymnasium, Ashland, Virginia (Host: Randolph–Macon College)
- Robert A. Kidera Gymnasium, Pittsford, New York (Host: Nazareth College)
- Freeman Athletic Center, Middletown, Connecticut (Host: Wesleyan University)
- Harrington Auditorium, Worcester, Massachusetts (Host: Worcester Polytechnic Institute)

Third and fourth rounds

2022 third and fourth round (blue) and Final Four (red) host sites

Third and fourth-round games were played at campus sites on March 11 and March 12.

At the conclusion of the second round, the NCAA announced the following locations would host third and fourth-round games.

- Horsburgh Gymnasium, Cleveland, Ohio (Host: Case Western Reserve University)
- Shirk Center, Bloomington, Illinois (Host: Illinois Wesleyan University)
- Ban Johnson Arena, Marietta, Ohio (Host: Marietta College)
- Crenshaw Gymnasium, Ashland, Virginia (Host: Randolph–Macon College)

National Semifinals and Championship

The National Semifinals and Championship were played on March 18 and March 19.

- Allen County War Memorial Coliseum, Fort Wayne, Indiana (Host: Manchester University)

Fort Wayne hosted the Final Four for the second time, having previously hosted in 2019. Fort Wayne was also scheduled to host the Final Four in 2020 and 2021, before those editions of the tournament were canceled due to COVID-19 concerns.

== Qualifying teams ==
=== Automatic bids (44) ===
The following 44 teams were automatic qualifiers for the 2022 NCAA field by virtue of winning their conference's automatic bid (except for the UAA, whose regular-season champion received the automatic bid).

Automatic bids
Conference	Team	Record (Conf.)	Appearance	Last bid
Allegheny Mountain	Medaille	15–12 (9–7)	6th	2017
American Rivers	Dubuque	21–6 (14–2)	7th	2015
American Southwest	Mary Hardin–Baylor	25–2 (17–2)	7th	2013
Atlantic East	Neumann	21–7 (10–2)	3rd	2017
Centennial	Johns Hopkins	22–3 (16–2)	13th	2020
CUNYAC	Baruch	20–7 (11–3)	6th	2019
Coast to Coast	Christopher Newport	24–2 (6–0)	25th	2020
CCIW	Elmhurst	22–6 (11–5)	7th	2020
Colonial States	Wilson	18–7 (12–2)	1st	Never
Commonwealth Coast	Nichols	25–3 (15–3)	5th	2020
Empire 8	Nazareth	23–4 (15–1)	9th	2018
Great Northeast	St. Joseph (CT)	26–1 (18–0)	2nd	2020
Heartland	Franklin	14–14 (7–11)	6th	2008
Landmark	Susquehanna	23–4 (13–1)	9th	2020
Liberty	Vassar	18–8 (11–6)	1st	Never
Little East	Keene State	20–6 (12–4)	7th	2019
MAC Commonwealth	Hood	20–6 (14–2)	2nd	2007
MAC Freedom	Stevens	16–8 (11–3)	4th	2020
MASCAC	Westfield State	22–4 (10–2)	5th	2020
Michigan	Hope	22–6 (12–2)	28th	2018
Midwest	Cornell College	19–8 (12–4)	4th	2009
Minnesota	St. John's (MN)	23–4 (17–2)	12th	2020
NECC	Mitchell	17–10 (4–2)	3rd	2019
NESCAC	Wesleyan (CT)	24–3 (9–1)	4th	2018
NEWMAC	WPI	24–2 (13–1)	14th	2020
New Jersey	Stockton	24–4 (15–3)	17th	2016
North Atlantic	Husson	15–9 (9–3)	8th	2019
North Coast	Wabash	24–3 (16–1)	6th	1998
Northern Athletics	Marian (WI)	19–8 (11–7)	3rd	2014
Northwest	Whitworth	22–4 (13–3)	15th	2020
Ohio	Marietta	25–2 (17–0)	10th	2020
Old Dominion	Randolph–Macon	27–1 (16–0)	18th	2020
Presidents'	Washington & Jefferson	24–4 (18–2)	3rd	1994
Skyline	Yeshiva	25–3 (14–2)	3rd	2020
Southern	Berry	23–2 (11–1)	2nd	2018
SCIAC	Pomona–Pitzer	21–4 (13–2)	14th	2020
SCAC	Trinity (TX) (Note: St. Thomas (TX) won the Southern Collegiate tournament, but was ineligible to participate in the postseason due to its recent transition to the NCAA from the NAIA. The automatic bid was awarded to Trinity (TX) as the tournament runner-up.)	22–5 (13–3)	11th	2014
SLIAC	Blackburn	11–17 (7–7)	3rd	2005
SUNYAC	Oswego State	25–2 (17–1)	7th	2019
United East	Penn State Harrisburg	23–3 (14–2)	2nd	2020
UAA	Emory	19–5 (12–2)	10th	2020
Upper Midwest	Northwestern–St. Paul	22–6 (13–1)	9th	2019
USA South	Averett	17–11 (11–3)	5th	2009
Wisconsin	UW–Oshkosh	22–3 (10–2)	11th	2020

=== At-large bids (20) ===
The following 20 teams were awarded qualification for the tournament field by the NCAA Division III Men's Basketball Committee. The committee evaluated teams on the basis of their win–loss percentage, strength of schedule, head-to-head results, results against common opponents, and results against teams included in the NCAA's final regional rankings.

At-large bids
Conference	Team	Record (Conf.)	Appearance	Last bid
NEWMAC	Babson	18–8 (11–2)	11th	2020
Michigan	Calvin	20–8 (11–3)	22nd	2017
UAA	Case Western Reserve	18–6 (8–5)	1st	Never
SCIAC	Chapman	22–4 (12–3)	5th	2016
MAC Freedom	DeSales	22–5 (13–2)	6th	2019
MAC Commonwealth	Eastern	21–5 (13–2)	1st	Never
NEWMAC	Emerson	18–7 (10–4)	2nd	2019
Ohio	Heidelberg	18–7 (12–5)	4th	2008
CCIW	Illinois Wesleyan	21–5 (14–2)	26th	2018
Ohio	Mount Union	23–4 (14–3)	4th	2020
UAA	Rochester	17–8 (8–6)	17th	2019
New Jersey	Rowan	23–5 (14–4)	14th	2019
Liberty	RPI	21–5 (15–3)	7th	2020
Centennial	Swarthmore	22–5 (15–3)	5th	2020
Little East	UMass Dartmouth	24–4 (14–2)	15th	2009
Wisconsin	UW–La Crosse	20–6 (9–5)	3rd	2019
Wisconsin	UW–Platteville	21–5 (9–4)	14th	2020
UAA	Washington–St. Louis	18–7 (8–6)	23rd	2020
CCIW	Wheaton (IL)	20–6 (12–4)	12th	2019
NESCAC	Williams	17–4 (5–3)	18th	2019

== Tournament bracket ==
* – Denotes overtime period

=== Top-left - Cleveland, Ohio ===
First round March 4 Campus Sites
UW–Oshkosh	92
Blackburn	74
Oshkosh, WI
Case Western Reserve	91*
Dubuque	87
Mary Hardin–Baylor	88
Chapman	81
Belton, TX
Whitworth	52
Trinity (TX)	77
UW–Platteville	76
Marian (WI)	59
Platteville, WI
St. John's (MN)	71
Calvin	77
Elmhurst	95
Washington & Jefferson	70
Elmhurst, IL
Pomona–Pitzer	67
Northwestern–St. Paul	66

Second round March 5 Campus Sites
UW–Oshkosh	74
Case Western Reserve	77
Mary Hardin–Baylor	98
Trinity (TX)	82
UW–Platteville	64
Calvin	76
Elmhurst	76
Pomona–Pitzer	70

Third round March 11; Cleveland, OH
Case Western Reserve	84
Mary Hardin–Baylor	89*
Calvin	77
Elmhurst	79

Quarterfinals; March 12; Cleveland, OH
Mary Hardin–Baylor	84
Elmhurst	87*

==== Cleveland Sectional Final ====
March 12
8:00 pm EST

Box Score

Mary Hardin–Baylor Crusaders 84, Elmhurst Blue Jays 87 (OT)
Scoring by half: 42-38, 35-39 Overtime: 7-10
Pts: Ty Prince – 21; Rebs: Ty Prince – 8 Asts: Ty Prince – 5	Pts: Jake Rhode – 21; Rebs: Jonathan Zapinski – 9 Asts: Jake Rhode – 6

Horsburgh Gymnasium – Cleveland, Ohio

=== Bottom-left - Bloomington, Illinois ===
First round March 4 Campus Sites
Emory	65
Averett	60
Atlanta, GA
Wabash	91
Berry	79
Mount Union	74
Stevens	84
Alliance, OH
Williams	95
Neumann	57
Illinois Wesleyan	73
Franklin	55
Bloomington, IL
UW–La Crosse	90
Heidelberg	86
Washington–St. Louis	71
Cornell (IA)	58
St. Louis, MO
Wheaton (IL)	70
Hope	69

Second round March 5 Campus Sites
Emory	86
Wabash	87
Stevens	61
Williams	71
Illinois Wesleyan	65
UW–La Crosse	56
Washington–St. Louis	61
Wheaton (IL)	63

Third round March 11; Bloomington, IL
Wabash	73
Williams	59
Illinois Wesleyan	77
Wheaton (IL)	73

Quarterfinals; March 12; Bloomington, IL
Wabash	81
Illinois Wesleyan	75

==== Bloomington Sectional Final ====
March 12
7:30 pm CST

Box Score

Wabash Little Giants 81, Illinois Wesleyan Titans 75
Scoring by half: 34-39, 47-36
Pts: Jack Davidson – 25; Rebs: Tyler Watson – 8 Asts: Tyler Watson – 5	Pts: Matthew Leritz – 21; Rebs: Matthew Leritz – 13; Asts: Luke Yoder, Cody Mitchell – 2

Shirk Center – Bloomington, Illinois

=== Top-right - Marietta, Ohio ===
First round March 4 Campus Sites
Marietta	91
Medaille	79
Marietta, OH
Rochester	88
Eastern	65
Swarthmore	83
Keene State	84
Swarthmore, PA
Oswego State	82
Hood	73
Christopher Newport	88
Baruch	50
Newport News, VA
Rowan	84
Susquehanna	94
Stockton	87
Wilson	52
Galloway, NJ
Johns Hopkins	63
Yeshiva	59

Second round March 5 Campus Sites
Marietta	88*
Rochester	83
Keene State	63
Oswego State	84
Christopher Newport	81
Susquehanna	67
Stockton	70
Johns Hopkins	63

Third round March 11; Marietta, OH
Marietta	89
Oswego State	81
Christopher Newport	93
Stockton	54

Quarterfinals; March 12; Marietta, OH
Marietta	81
Christopher Newport	79

==== Marietta Sectional Final ====
March 12
7:00 pm EST

Box Score

Marietta Pioneers 81, Christopher Newport Captains 79
Scoring by half: 30-37, 51-42
Pts: Lukas Isaly – 38; Rebs: Sahmi Willoughby – 10; Asts: Mason Lydic – 4	Pts: Jahn Hines – 20; Rebs: Ty Henderson – 10; Asts: Trey Barber, Ty Henderson – 2

Ban Johnson Arena – Marietta, Ohio

=== Bottom-right - Ashland, Virginia ===
First round March 4 Campus Sites
Randolph–Macon	99
Mitchell	57
Ashland, VA
DeSales	67
Babson	80
Nazareth	78
Westfield State	71
Pittsford, NY
UMass Dartmouth	86
Emerson	83
Wesleyan (CT)	81
Husson	61
Middletown, CT
Nichols	58
RPI	78
WPI	77
Vassar	58
Worcester, MA
St. Joseph (CT)	53
Penn State Harrisburg	63

Second round March 5 Campus Sites
Randolph–Macon	67
Babson	51
Nazareth	68
UMass Dartmouth	78
Wesleyan (CT)	58
RPI	59
WPI	72
Penn State Harrisburg	52

Third round March 11; Ashland, VA
Randolph–Macon	92
UMass Dartmouth	69
RPI	55
WPI	56

Quarterfinals; March 12; Ashland, VA
Randolph–Macon	76
WPI	53

==== Ashland Sectional Final ====
March 12
7:30 pm EST

Box Score

Randolph–Macon Yellow Jackets 76, WPI Engineers 53
Scoring by half: 40-33, 36-20
Pts: Buzz Anthony – 23; Rebs: Daniel Mbangue – 6 Asts: Josh Talbert – 7	Pts: John Lowther – 15; Rebs: John Adams – 8 Asts: Andrew Lufkin – 2

Crenshaw Gymnasium – Ashland, Virginia

=== Final Four ===
National semifinal March 18; Fort Wayne, IN
Elmhurst	90
Wabash	68
Marietta	63
Randolph–Macon	81

National championship March 19; Fort Wayne, IN
Elmhurst	45
Randolph–Macon	75

==== National Semifinals ====
March 18
4:00 pm EDT

Box Score

Marietta Pioneers 63, Randolph–Macon Yellow Jackets 81
Scoring by half: 28-38, 35-43
Pts: Lukas Isaly – 23; Rebs: Jason Ellis – 7 Asts: Tim Kreeger – 5	Pts: Ian Robertson – 22; Rebs: Daniel Mbangue – 10; Asts: Buzz Anthony – 10

Allen County War Memorial Coliseum – Fort Wayne, Indiana

March 18
6:30 pm EDT

Box Score

Elmhurst Blue Jays 90, Wabash Little Giants 68
Scoring by half: 48-34, 42-34
Pts: Jake Rhode – 32; Rebs: Bryce Drews – 11; Asts: Dominic Genco – 4	Pts: Jack Davidson – 21; Rebs: Jack Davidson – 6 Asts: Three tied – 2

Allen County War Memorial Coliseum – Fort Wayne, Indiana

==== National Championship ====
March 19
6:00 pm EDT

Box Score

Elmhurst Blue Jays 45, Randolph–Macon Yellow Jackets 75
Scoring by half: 23-38, 22-37
Pts: Lavon Thomas – 10; Rebs: Jonathan Zapinski – 7 Asts: Jake Rhode, Dominic Genco – 2	Pts: Josh Talbert – 15; Rebs: Josh Talbert – 11; Asts: Buzz Anthony, Josh Talbert – 4

Allen County War Memorial Coliseum – Fort Wayne, Indiana

==== All-Tournament Team ====
- Buzz Anthony (Sr, Randolph–Macon) – Most Outstanding Player
- Miles Mallory (Jr, Randolph–Macon)
- Jake Rhode (Sr, Elmhurst)
- Lukas Isaly (Sr, Marietta)
- Jack Davidson (Sr, Wabash)

== Record by conference ==
Conference	Record	Win %	R64	R32	S16	E8	F4	CG	NC
Old Dominion	6–0	1.000	1	1	1	1	1	1	1
CCIW	10–3	.769	3	3	3	2	1	1	
North Coast	4–1	.800	1	1	1	1	1		
Ohio	4–3	.571	3	1	1	1	1		
American Southwest	3–1	.750	1	1	1	1			
Coast to Coast	3–1	.750	1	1	1	1			
NEWMAC	4–3	.571	3	2	1	1			
SUNYAC	2–1	.667	1	1	1				
Little East	3–2	.600	2	2	1				
NESCAC	3–2	.600	2	2	1				
New Jersey	3–2	.600	2	2	1				
UAA	5–4	.556	4	4	1				
Liberty	2–2	.500	2	1	1				
Michigan	2–2	.500	2	1	1				
Wisconsin	3–3	.500	3	3					
Empire 8	1–1	.500	1	1					
Landmark	1–1	.500	1	1					
Southern Collegiate	1–1	.500	1	1					
United East	1–1	.500	1	1					
Centennial	1–2	.333	2	1					
MAC Freedom	1–2	.333	2	1					
SCIAC	1–2	.333	2	1					
MAC Commonwealth	0–2	.000	2						

- The R64, R32, S16, E8, F4, CG, and NC columns indicate how many teams from each conference were in the round of 64 (first round), round of 32 (second round), Sweet 16, Elite Eight, Final Four, championship game, and national champion, respectively.
- The Allegheny Mountain, American Rivers, Atlantic East, CUNYAC, Colonial States, Commonwealth Coast, Great Northeast, Heartland, MASCAC, Midwest, Minnesota, NECC, North Atlantic, Northern Athletics, Northwest, Presidents', Skyline, SAA, SLIAC, Upper Midwest, and USA South each had one representative, eliminated in the Round of 64 with a record of 0–1.

== See also ==
- 2022 NCAA Division I men's basketball tournament
- 2022 NCAA Division II men's basketball tournament
- 2022 NAIA men's basketball tournament
- 2022 NCAA Division III women's basketball tournament
