= 2020 NCAA Division III men's basketball tournament =

American collegiate men's basketball tournament (2020)

- Teams: 64
- Finals site: Championship game: State Farm Arena, Atlanta, Georgia; Quarterfinals and Semifinals: Allen County War Memorial Coliseum, Fort Wayne, Indiana
- Champions: Ex aequo when tournament abandoned: Swarthmore; Hobart; Christopher Newport; Washington–St. Louis; North Central (IL); Randolph–Macon; Yeshiva; Mount Union; Wittenberg; Pomona–Pitzer; Elmhurst; St. Thomas (MN); St. John's (MN); Whitworth; SUNY-Brockport; Tufts
- Abandoned COVID-19 pandemic

The 2020 NCAA Division III men's basketball tournament was a single-elimination tournament to determine the national champion of men's NCAA Division III college basketball in the United States. Featuring sixty-four teams, it began on March 6, 2020, following the 2019–20 season, and was to conclude with the championship game on April 5, 2020.

The national quarterfinal and semifinal rounds were to be held at the Allen County War Memorial Coliseum in Fort Wayne, Indiana, the site of the 2019 tournament finals, while the championship game was to be played at State Farm Arena in Atlanta, Georgia, coinciding with the Division I Final Four.

As a result of the ongoing COVID-19 pandemic, Johns Hopkins University announced that it had chosen not to admit spectators to the first and second-round games hosted there. On March 12, the NCAA announced that the remaining games of the tournament were cancelled due to the coronavirus pandemic.

Sixteen teams had advanced to the third round at the time the tournament was called off.

The ex aequo list of the 16 teams remaining when the tournament was abandoned were Swarthmore, Hobart, Christopher Newport, Washington–St. Louis, North Central (IL), Randolph–Macon, Yeshiva, Mount Union, Wittenberg, Pomona–Pitzer, Elmhurst. St. Thomas (MN), St. John's (MN), Whitworth, SUNY-Brockport, and Tufts.

Of those 16 teams, Swarthmore College (608 points) was the highest remaining team of the 16 in the final poll, a de facto mythical national championship.

== Qualifying teams ==
=== Automatic bids (43) ===
The following 43 teams were automatic qualifiers for the 2020 NCAA field by virtue of winning their conference's automatic bid (except for the UAA, whose regular-season champion received the automatic bid).

Automatic bids
| Conference | Team | Record (Conf.) | Appearance | Last bid |
|---|---|---|---|---|
| Allegheny Mountain | La Roche | 21–6 (19–1) | 3rd | 2018 |
| American Rivers | Nebraska Wesleyan | 24–3 (15–1) | 17th | 2019 |
| American Southwest | LeTourneau | 23–5 (13–3) | 2nd | 2018 |
| Capital | York (PA) | 22–5 (9–1) | 7th | 2019 |
| Centennial | Johns Hopkins | 24–3 (16–2) | 12th | 2018 |
| CUNYAC | Brooklyn | 13–15 (7–7) | 5th | 2016 |
| CCIW | Elmhurst | 23–5 (11–5) | 6th | 2016 |
| Colonial States | Cairn | 18–9 (11–3) | 1st | Never |
| Commonwealth Coast | Nichols | 20–8 (12–4) | 4th | 2019 |
| Empire 8 | St. John Fisher | 19–8 (12–2) | 17th | 2017 |
| Great Northeast | St. Joseph (CT) | 26–2 (11–0) | 1st | Never |
| Heartland | Transylvania | 19–8 (13–5) | 10th | 2013 |
| Landmark | Susquehanna | 20–7 (11–3) | 8th | 2017 |
| Liberty | Ithaca | 23–5 (15–3) | 11th | 2013 |
| Little East | Western Connecticut | 20–7 (12–4) | 13th | 2012 |
| MAC Commonwealth | Lycoming | 20–8 (10–6) | 8th | 2017 |
| MAC Freedom | Stevens | 23–4 (12–2) | 3rd | 2013 |
| MASCAC | Westfield State | 20–7 (10–2) | 4th | 2015 |
| Michigan | Adrian | 17–11 (8–6) | 1st | Never |
| Midwest | Ripon | 20–7 (14–4) | 14th | 2017 |
| Minnesota | St. John's (MN) | 25–2 (19–1) | 11th | 2019 |
| NECC | New England College | 21–6 (10–2) | 2nd | 2018 |
| NESCAC | Tufts | 21–6 (8–2) | 6th | 2017 |
| NEWMAC | Coast Guard | 14–13 (6–8) | 4th | 2008 |
| New Jersey | TCNJ | 19–8 (14–4) | 7th | 1998 |
| North Atlantic | SUNY Canton | 16–11 (10–4) | 1st | Never |
| North Coast | Wooster | 21–7 (12–6) | 29th | 2019 |
| NEAC | Penn State Harrisburg | 20–7 (14–2) | 1st | Never |
| Northern Athletics | Concordia (WI) | 19–9 (15–5) | 4th | 2015 |
| Northwest | Whitman | 20–7 (13–3) | 5th | 2019 |
| Ohio | Mount Union | 25–3 (17–1) | 3rd | 2015 |
| Old Dominion | Randolph–Macon | 26–2 (15–1) | 17th | 2019 |
| Presidents' | Grove City | 20–8 (13–3) | 6th | 2010 |
| Skyline | Yeshiva | 27–1 (16–0) | 2nd | 2018 |
| Southern | Centre | 24–4 (11–3) | 17th | 2014 |
| SCIAC | Pomona–Pitzer | 22–5 (13–3) | 13th | 2019 |
| SCAC | Centenary (LA) | 18–9 (13–5) | 1st | Never |
| SLIAC | Webster | 19–8 (16–2) | 5th | 2014 |
| SUNYAC | SUNY Brockport | 24–3 (17–1) | 12th | 2018 |
| UAA | Emory | 21–4 (11–3) | 9th | 2019 |
| Upper Midwest | Bethany Lutheran | 21–6 (14–2) | 2nd | 2018 |
| USA South | Methodist | 18–10 (11–6) | 6th | 2005 |
| Wisconsin | UW–Oshkosh | 19–8 (11–3) | 10th | 2019 |

=== At-large bids (21) ===
The following 21 teams were awarded qualification for the tournament field by the NCAA Division III Men's Basketball Committee. The committee evaluated teams on the basis of their win–loss percentage, strength of schedule, head-to-head results, results against common opponents, and results against teams included in the NCAA's final regional rankings. By rule, one bid is reserved for teams in Pool B if there are enough teams that qualify for it. Pool B is for teams that are either independents or whose conference does not yet qualify for an automatic bid.

At-large bids
| Conference | Team | Record (Conf.) | Appearance | Last bid | Pool |
|---|---|---|---|---|---|
| NEWMAC | Babson | 20–6 (10–4) | 10th | 2017 | C |
| Northern Athletics | Benedictine (IL) | 20–6 (16–4) | 9th | 2017 | C |
| Capital | Christopher Newport | 21–6 (9–1) | 24th | 2019 | C |
| NESCAC | Colby | 24–3 (8–2) | 4th | 1997 | C |
| Liberty | Hobart | 21–5 (15–3) | 5th | 2014 | C |
| Ohio | Marietta | 21–6 (14–4) | 9th | 2019 | C |
| NESCAC | Middlebury | 20–5 (6–4) | 11th | 2019 | C |
| CCIW | North Central (IL) | 21–5 (14–2) | 12th | 2019 | C |
| Liberty | RPI | 23–4 (17–1) | 6th | 2009 | C |
| NEWMAC | Springfield | 22–4 (11–1) | 10th | 2018 | C |
| Midwest | St. Norbert | 23–4 (17–1) | 9th | 2016 | C |
| Minnesota | St. Thomas (MN) | 24–3 (19–1) | 20th | 2019 | C |
| Centennial | Swarthmore | 26–1 (18–0) | 4th | 2019 | C |
| American Southwest | Texas–Dallas | 21–6 (14–2) | 7th | 2019 | C |
| Wisconsin | UW–Eau Claire | 19–9 (8–6) | 3rd | 2001 | C |
| Wisconsin | UW–Platteville | 22–4 (12–2) | 13th | 2019 | C |
| UAA | Washington–St. Louis | 20–5 (11–3) | 22nd | 2018 | C |
| Atlantic East | Wesley | 18–9 (10–2) | 5th | 2014 | B |
| Northwest | Whitworth | 21–6 (14–2) | 14th | 2018 | C |
| North Coast | Wittenberg | 26–2 (17–1) | 30th | 2019 | C |
| NEWMAC | WPI | 20–7 (10–3) | 13th | 2016 | C |

== Tournament bracket ==
* – Denotes overtime period

=== Top-left ===
First round March 6 Campus Sites
Swarthmore | 85
Brooklyn | 51
Swarthmore, PA
Babson | 88
Ithaca | 94*
Texas–Dallas | 83
Centenary (LA) | 81
Richardson, TX
LeTourneau | 86
Whitworth | 88
SUNY Brockport | 92
Coast Guard | 86
Brockport, NY
Middlebury | 78
Westfield State | 69
Tufts | 74
Western Connecticut | 72
Medford, MA
RPI | 58
New England College | 57

Second round March 7 Campus Sites
Swarthmore | 86
Ithaca | 78
Texas–Dallas | 66
Whitworth | 73
SUNY Brockport | 84
Middlebury | 81
Tufts | 75
RPI | 66

Third Round; March 14; Campus Sites
Swarthmore
Whitworth
SUNY Brockport
Tufts

Quarterfinals; March 20; Fort Wayne, IN

=== Bottom-left ===
First round March 6 Campus Sites
UW–Platteville | 86
Concordia (WI) | 74
Platteville, WI
St. Thomas (MN) | 67
St. Norbert | 60
St. John's (MN) | 87
Ripon | 75
Collegeville, MN
Whitman | 61
UW–Eau Claire | 78
Emory | 78
Methodist | 74
Atlanta, GA
Centre | 64
Pomona–Pitzer | 84
Wooster | 62
Grove City | 67
Wooster, OH
Elmhurst | 97
Lycoming | 73

Second round March 7 Campus Sites
UW–Platteville | 70
St. Thomas (MN) | 73
St. John's (MN) | 78
UW–Eau Claire | 69
Emory | 70
Pomona–Pitzer | 71
Grove City | 66
Elmhurst | 84

Third round March 14; Campus Sites
St. Thomas (MN)
St. John's (MN)
Pomona–Pitzer
Elmhurst

Quarterfinals; March 20; Fort Wayne, IN

=== Top-right ===
First round March 6 Campus Sites
Mount Union | 107
Cairn | 76
Alliance, OH
York (PA) | 88
St. John Fisher | 67
Wittenberg | 83
La Roche | 55
Springfield, OH
Benedictine (IL) | 59
Susquehanna | 64
Randolph–Macon | 81
Wesley | 69
Ashland, VA
Marietta | 73
TCNJ | 89
Johns Hopkins | 96
Penn State Harrisburg | 104**
Baltimore, MD (Note: Due to precautions related to the COVID-19 pandemic, officials announced that spectators will not be admitted to first and second round games to be played in Baltimore.)
WPI | 78
Yeshiva | 102

Second round March 7 Campus Sites
Mount Union | 90
York (PA) | 77
Wittenberg | 77
Susquehanna | 73
Randolph–Macon | 85
TCNJ | 71
Penn State Harrisburg | 83
Yeshiva | 102

Third round March 13; Campus Sites
Mount Union
Wittenberg
Randolph–Macon
Yeshiva

Quarterfinals; March 20; Fort Wayne, IN

=== Bottom-right ===
First round March 6 Campus Sites
Springfield | 74
SUNY Canton | 49
Springfield, MA
Hobart | 78
St. Joseph (CT) | 74
Stevens | 72
Nichols | 74
Hoboken, NJ
Colby | 64
Christopher Newport | 74
Nebraska Wesleyan | 77
Webster | 73
Lincoln, NE
Washington–St. Louis | 102
Bethany Lutheran | 68
North Central (IL) | 74
Adrian | 58
Naperville, IL
UW–Oshkosh | 74
Transylvania | 58

Second round March 7 Campus Sites
Springfield | 61
Hobart | 62
Nichols | 82
Christopher Newport | 91
Nebraska Wesleyan | 58
Washington–St. Louis | 79
North Central (IL) | 84
UW–Oshkosh | 82

Third round March 13; Campus Sites
Hobart
Christopher Newport
Washington–St. Louis
North Central (IL)

Quarterfinals; March 20; Fort Wayne, IN

== Final Four ==
Those rounds were cancelled.

National semifinal March 21 (Note: Subject to rescheduling to accommodate Yeshiva University policy concerning athletic competition and Shabbat.); Fort Wayne, IN

National championship April 5 Atlanta, GA

== Final Poll Results ==
The D3Sports poll results after the tournament was abandoned.

D3 Sports Poll Results - Final Poll
| Pos | Team | W-L | Pts |
|---|---|---|---|
| 1 | Swarthmore (18) | 28-1 | 608 |
| 2 | St. John's (1) | 27-2 | 589 |
| 3 | Randolph-Macon (2) | 28-2 | 567 |
| 4 | St. Thomas (1) | 26-3 | 546 |
| 5 | Mount Union (3) | 27-3 | 545 |
| 6 | North Central (Ill.) | 23-5 | 455 |
| 7 | Wittenberg | 28-2 | 452 |
| 8 | Yeshiva | 29-1 | 415 |
| 9 | Washington U. | 22-5 | 409 |
| 10 | Elmhurst | 25-5 | 365 |
| 11 | Brockport | 26-3 | 331 |
| 12 | UW-Platteville | 23-5 | 325 |
| 13 | Johns Hopkins | 24-4 | 277 |
| 14 | Nebraska Wesleyan | 25-4 | 261 |
| 15 | Tufts | 23-6 | 247 |
| 16 | Pomona-Pitzer | 24-5 | 230 |
| 17 | Christopher Newport | 23-6 | 223 |
| 18 | Emory | 22-5 | 209 |
| 19 | Whitworth | 23-6 | 175 |
| 20 | Hobart | 23-5 | 172 |
| 21 | Colby | 24-4 | 142 |
| 22 | Springfield | 23-5 | 121 |
| 23 | UW-Oshkosh | 20-9 | 87 |
| 24 | St. Joseph (Conn.) | 26-3 | 79 |
| 25 | Middlebury | 21-6 | 77 |

== See also ==
- 2020 NCAA Division III women's basketball tournament
- 2020 NCAA Division I men's basketball tournament
- 2020 NCAA Division II men's basketball tournament
- 2020 NAIA Division I men's basketball tournament
- 2020 NAIA Division II men's basketball tournament
