= 2018 NCAA Division III men's basketball tournament =

American collegiate men's basketball tournament (2018)

- Teams: 64
- Finals site: , Salem Civic Center; Salem, Virginia
- Champions: Nebraska Wesleyan Prairie Wolves (1st title)
- Runner-up: Wisconsin–Oshkosh Titans (1st title game)
- Semifinalists: Ramapo Roadrunners (2nd Final Four); Springfield Pride (1st Final Four)
- Winning coach: Dale Wellman (1st title)
- MOP: Cooper Cook (Nebraska Wesleyan)

The 2018 NCAA Division III men's basketball tournament was the 44th annual single-elimination tournament to determine the national champion of men's NCAA Division III college basketball in the United States. Featuring sixty-four teams, it began on March 2, 2018, following the 2017–18 season, and concluded with the championship game on March 17, 2018.

Once again, the national semifinal and championship rounds were held at the Salem Civic Center in Salem, Virginia.

Nebraska Wesleyan defeated Wisconsin–Oshkosh in the final, 78–72, to win their first national title. Cooper Cook was voted the MVP.

== Qualifying teams ==
=== Automatic bids (43) ===
The following 43 teams were automatic qualifiers for the 2018 NCAA field by virtue of winning their conference's automatic bid (except for the UAA, whose regular-season champion received the automatic bid).

Automatic bids
Conference	Team	Record (Conf.)	Appearance	Last bid
Allegheny Mountain	La Roche	21–6 (16–2)	2nd	2011
American Southwest	Sul Ross State	22–6 (14–3)	2nd	2004
Capital	York (PA)	23–4 (14–4)	5th	2012
Centennial	Johns Hopkins	23–4 (15–3)	11th	2015
CUNYAC	Staten Island	17–11 (12–4)	13th	2017
CCIW	Augustana (IL)	22–5 (12–4)	17th	2017
Colonial States	Cabrini	24–3 (16–2)	14th	2017
Commonwealth Coast	Nichols	25–3 (16–2)	2nd	2017
Empire 8	Nazareth	20–7 (13–3)	8th	2010
Great Northeast	Johnson & Wales (RI)	19–9 (13–3)	4th	2016
Heartland	Hanover	22–6 (14–4)	8th	2017
Iowa	Nebraska Wesleyan	24–3 (13–3)	15th	2001
Landmark	Moravian	20–7 (10–4)	3rd	2008
Liberty	Union (NY)	18–8 (12–6)	5th	2017
Little East	Eastern Connecticut	25–3 (13–1)	8th	2017
MAC Commonwealth	Lebanon Valley	18–9 (10–6)	7th	2005
MAC Freedom	Misericordia	17–10 (10–4)	4th	2017
MASCAC	Bridgewater State	18–9 (9–3)	8th	2014
Michigan	Hope	18–9 (10–4)	27th	2017
Midwest	Monmouth (IL)	20–7 (15–3)	5th	1990
Minnesota	Augsburg	21–7 (13–7)	4th	1999
NECC	Southern Vermont	22–5 (12–2)	3rd	2016
NESCAC	Williams	22–5 (7–3)	16th	2017
NEWMAC	MIT	22–5 (10–4)	8th	2017
New Jersey	Ramapo	21–6 (15–3)	8th	2017
North Atlantic	New England College	21–6 (15–3)	1st	Never
North Coast	Wittenberg	26–2 (16–2)	28th	2014
NEAC	Lancaster Bible	23–5 (15–1)	2nd	2016
Northern Athletics	Aurora	19–8 (16–4)	10th	2013
Northwest	Whitworth	24–3 (14–2)	13th	2017
Ohio	John Carroll	23–5 (14–4)	15th	2016
Old Dominion	Emory and Henry	22–6 (11–5)	6th	1993
Presidents'	Thomas More	23–5 (16–2)	3rd	2017
Skyline	Yeshiva	18–10 (13–7)	1st	Never
Southern	Berry	11–17 (3–11)	1st	Never
SCIAC	Claremont–Mudd–Scripps	19–7 (15–1)	14th	2017
SCAC	Schreiner	15–12 (10–4)	1st	Never
SLIAC	Greenville	19–8 (14–4)	1st	Never
SUNYAC	Plattsburgh State	22–4 (17–1)	10th	2016
UAA	Washington–St. Louis	22–3 (13–1)	21st	2017
Upper Midwest	Bethany Lutheran	19–8 (14–3)	1st	Never
USA South	Maryville (TN)	22–6 (14–2)	19th	2012
Wisconsin	UW–Stevens Point	19–8 (11–3)	15th	2015

=== At-large bids (21) ===
The following 21 teams were awarded qualification for the 2018 NCAA field by the NCAA Division III Men's Basketball Committee. The committee evaluated teams on the basis of their win-loss percentage, strength of schedule, head-to-head results, results against common opponents, and results against teams included in the NCAA's final regional rankings.

At-large bids
Conference	Team	Record (Conf.)	Appearance	Last bid
MAC Commonwealth	Albright	20–6 (12–4)	6th	2010
Capital	Christopher Newport	21–6 (14–4)	22nd	2017
UAA	Emory	21–4 (12–2)	7th	2017
Centennial	Franklin & Marshall	20–6 (14–4)	25th	2016
NESCAC	Hamilton	22–4 (7–3)	10th	2006
CCIW	Illinois Wesleyan	19–7 (12–4)	25th	2015
American Southwest	LeTourneau	23–4 (16–2)	1st	Never
Ohio	Marietta	21–6 (14–4)	7th	2017
NESCAC	Middlebury	19–6 (7–3)	9th	2017
New Jersey	New Jersey City	19–7 (13–5)	18th	2017
CCIW	North Central (IL)	19–8 (11–5)	10th	2017
Minnesota	St. John's (MN)	23–3 (19–1)	9th	2007
Minnesota	St. Olaf	19–7 (15–5)	4th	2016
NEWMAC	Springfield	18–8 (12–2)	9th	2015
SUNYAC	SUNY Brockport	19–7 (14–4)	11th	2014
Centennial	Swarthmore	22–5 (15–3)	2nd	2017
Wisconsin	UW–Oshkosh	20–7 (9–5)	8th	2017
Wisconsin	UW–Platteville	22–4 (12–2)	11th	2009
NESCAC	Wesleyan (CT)	21–6 (7–3)	3rd	2017
Northwest	Whitman	26–1 (16–0)	3rd	2017
North Coast	Wooster	21–6 (14–4)	27th	2017

== Tournament bracket ==
=== Top-left - Mahwah, New Jersey ===
First round March 2 Campus Sites
Williams	56
Bridgewater State	45
Williamstown, MA
Ramapo	86
Moravian	61
Christopher Newport	68
Lancaster Bible	65
Newport News, VA
Emory & Henry	59
Franklin & Marshall	73
Eastern Connecticut	75
Johnson & Wales (RI)	69
Windham, CT
Middlebury	83
Lebanon Valley	63
Johns Hopkins	52
La Roche	39
Baltimore, MD
MIT	81
SUNY Brockport	67

Second round March 3 Campus Sites
Williams	62
Ramapo	66
Christopher Newport	52
Franklin & Marshall	66
Eastern Connecticut	58
Middlebury	83
Johns Hopkins	54
MIT	62

Sectional Semifinals; March 9 Mahwah, NJ
Ramapo	72
Franklin & Marshall	62
Middlebury	76
MIT	79

Sectional Final; March 10; Mahwah, NJ
Ramapo	68
MIT	66

=== Bottom-left - Rock Island, Illinois ===
First round March 2 Campus Sites
Wittenberg	91
Misericordia	61
Springfield, OH
Marietta	67
UW–Oshkosh	74
Emory	91
Berry	61
Atlanta, GA
LeTourneau	85
Hanover	77
Augustana (IL)	123
Greenville	111
Rock Island, IL
Augsburg	91
Hope	93
John Carroll	95
Thomas More	72
University Heights, OH
Wooster	72
Illinois Wesleyan	68

Second round March 3 Campus Sites
Wittenberg	60
UW–Oshkosh	68
Emory	83
LeTourneau	82
Augustana (IL)	95
Hope	83
John Carroll	91
Wooster	85

Sectional Semifinals; March 9 Rock Island, IL
UW–Oshkosh	93
Emory	72
Augustana (IL)	86
John Carroll	78

Sectional Final; March 10; Rock Island, IL
UW–Oshkosh	95
Augustana (IL)	88

=== Top-right - Platteville, Wisconsin ===
First round March 2 Campus Sites
Whitman	87
Schreiner	77
Walla Walla, WA
Whitworth	82
Claremont–Mudd–Scripps	83
St. John's (MN)	92
Bethany Lutheran	102
Collegeville, MN
UW–Stevens Point	72
North Central (IL)	55
Washington–St. Louis	80
Aurora	82
St. Louis, MO
Nebraska Wesleyan	94
Maryville (TN)	70
UW–Platteville	91
Monmouth (IL)	76
Platteville, WI
Sul Ross State	75
St. Olaf	88

Second round March 3 Campus Sites
Whitman	89
Claremont–Mudd–Scripps	84
Bethany Lutheran	44
UW–Stevens Point	82
Aurora	61
Nebraska Wesleyan	82
UW–Platteville	74
St. Olaf	68

Sectional Semifinals; March 9 Platteville, WI
Whitman	65
UW–Stevens Point	55
Nebraska Wesleyan	79
UW–Platteville	78

Sectional Final; March 10; Platteville, WI
Whitman	97
Nebraska Wesleyan	130

=== Bottom-right - Swarthmore, Pennsylvania ===
First round March 2 Campus Sites
Wesleyan (CT)	101
Southern Vermont	71
Middletown, CT
Swarthmore	90
New England College	63
Plattsburgh State	103
Nichols	86
Plattsburgh, NY
New Jersey City	70
Union (NY)	75
York (PA)	81
Yeshiva	67
York, PA
Hamilton	86
Nazareth	72
Cabrini	88
Staten Island	86
Radnor, PA
Albright	86
Springfield	88

Second round March 3 Campus Sites
Wesleyan (CT)	75
Swarthmore	97
Plattsburgh State	87
Union (NY)	75
York (PA)	66
Hamilton	69
Cabrini	88
Springfield	96

Sectional Semifinals; March 9 Swarthmore, PA
Swarthmore	93
Plattsburgh State	63
Hamilton	90
Springfield	92

Sectional Final; March 10; Swarthmore, PA
Swarthmore	62
Springfield	72

== Final Four ==
National semifinal March 16
Ramapo	57
UW–Oshkosh	73
Salem, VA
Nebraska Wesleyan	90
Springfield	78

National championship March 17
UW–Oshkosh	72
Nebraska Wesleyan	78

== See also ==
- 2018 NCAA Division I men's basketball tournament
- 2018 NCAA Division II men's basketball tournament
- 2018 NCAA Division I women's basketball tournament
- 2018 National Invitation Tournament
- 2018 Women's National Invitation Tournament
- 2018 NAIA Division I men's basketball tournament
- 2018 NAIA Division II men's basketball tournament
- 2018 NAIA Division I women's basketball tournament
