= 2019 NCAA Division III men's basketball tournament =

American collegiate men's basketball tournament (2019)

- Teams: 64
- Finals site: Allen County War Memorial Coliseum, Fort Wayne, Indiana
- Champions: UW–Oshkosh (1st title, 1st title game, 2nd Final Four)
- Runner-up: Swarthmore (1st title game, 1st Final Four)
- Semifinalists: Christopher Newport (2nd Final Four); Wheaton (IL) (1st Final Four)

The 2019 NCAA Division III men's basketball tournament was a single-elimination tournament to determine the national champion of men's NCAA Division III college basketball in the United States. Featuring sixty-four teams, it began on March 1, 2019, following the 2018–19 season, and concluded with the championship game on March 16, 2019.

The national semifinal and championship rounds was held for the first time at the Allen County War Memorial Coliseum in Fort Wayne, Indiana. The tournament was won by the UW–Oshkosh Titans.

== Qualifying teams ==
=== Automatic bids (43) ===
The following 43 teams were automatic qualifiers for the 2019 NCAA field by virtue of winning their conference's automatic bid (except for the UAA, whose regular-season champion received the automatic bid).

Automatic bids
Conference	Team	Record (Conf.)	Appearance	Last bid
Allegheny Mountain	Penn State Behrend	23–4 (14–4)	8th	2014
American Rivers	Nebraska Wesleyan	26–1 (15–1)	16th	2018
American Southwest	Texas–Dallas	24–4 (12–3)	6th	2014
Capital	Christopher Newport	25–3 (12–2)	23rd	2018
Centennial	Swarthmore	24–3 (15–3)	3rd	2018
CUNYAC	Baruch	22–5 (13–2)	5th	2015
CCIW	North Central (IL)	22–5 (12–4)	11th	2018
Colonial States	Rosemont	15–12 (8–4)	1st	Never
Commonwealth Coast	Nichols	25–2 (15–1)	3rd	2018
Empire 8	Alfred	23–4 (14–2)	5th	1997
Great Northeast	Albertus Magnus	20–7 (9–2)	7th	2017
Heartland	Hanover	21–6 (14–4)	9th	2018
Landmark	Moravian	19–8 (10–4)	4th	2018
Liberty	Skidmore	19–7 (15–3)	6th	2017
Little East	Keene State	20–7 (13–3)	6th	2017
MAC Commonwealth	Arcadia	22–5 (14–2)	1st	Never
MAC Freedom	DeSales	21–6 (12–2)	5th	2014
MASCAC	Salem State	18–9 (10–2)	25th	2017
Michigan	Albion	19–8 (10–4)	5th	2005
Midwest	Lake Forest	18–9 (12–6)	1st	Never
Minnesota	St. John's (MN)	23–4 (17–3)	10th	2018
NECC	Mitchell	19–9 (10–6)	2nd	2014
NESCAC	Amherst	23–4 (7–3)	20th	2017
NEWMAC	Emerson	16–11 (9–5)	1st	Never
New Jersey	Rowan	21–6 (13–5)	13th	2000
North Atlantic	Husson	17–10 (11–3)	7th	2017
North Coast	Wittenberg	23–5 (14–4)	29th	2018
NEAC	Morrisville State	23–4 (15–1)	5th	2017
Northern Athletics	Aurora	17–11 (12–8)	11th	2018
Northwest	Whitman	26–1 (16–0)	4th	2018
Ohio	Baldwin Wallace	20–9 (11–7)	7th	2006
Old Dominion	Guilford	21–7 (12–4)	6th	2017
Presidents'	Chatham	19–9 (10–7)	1st	Never
Skyline	Farmingdale State	20–7 (16–4)	6th	2017
Southern	Sewanee	22–6 (8–6)	5th	1998
SCIAC	Pomona–Pitzer	25–2 (15–1)	12th	2008
SCAC	Texas Lutheran	18–9 (11–5)	4th	2017
SLIAC	Eureka	13–14 (10–8)	1st	Never
SUNYAC	Oswego State	22–5 (15–3)	6th	2017
UAA	Emory	20–6 (11–3)	8th	2018
Upper Midwest	Northwestern–St. Paul	21–6 (15–1)	8th	2017
USA South	Maryville (TN)	21–7 (14–4)	20th	2018
Wisconsin	UW–Platteville	18–10 (8–6)	12th	2018

=== At-large bids (21) ===
The following 21 teams were awarded qualification for the 2018 NCAA field by the NCAA Division III Men's Basketball Committee. The committee evaluated teams on the basis of their win–loss percentage, strength of schedule, head-to-head results, results against common opponents, and results against teams included in the NCAA's final regional rankings. By rule, one bid is reserved for teams in Pool B if there are enough teams that qualify for it. Pool B is for teams that are either independents or whose conference does not yet qualify for an automatic bid.

At-large bids
Conference	Team	Record (Conf.)	Appearance	Last bid	Pool
CCIW	Augustana (IL)	24–3 (15–1)	18th	2018	C
Ohio	Capital	20–7 (14–4)	10th	2012	C
Atlantic East	Gwynedd Mercy	19–8 (9–3)	6th	2016	B
NESCAC	Hamilton	23–4 (7–3)	11th	2018	C
American Rivers	Loras	21–6 (12–4)	3rd	2008	C
Ohio	Marietta	20–6 (14–4)	8th	2018	C
NESCAC	Middlebury	18–7 (7–3)	10th	2018	C
NEWMAC	MIT	22–4 (12–2)	9th	2018	C
New Jersey	New Jersey City	20–7 (14–4)	19th	2018	C
SUNYAC	Plattsburgh State	20–6 (14–4)	11th	2018	C
New Jersey	Ramapo	18–9 (11–7)	9th	2018	C
Old Dominion	Randolph–Macon	25–3 (15–1)	16th	2015	C
UAA	Rochester	20–5 (10–4)	16th	2017	C
Capital	Salisbury	19–8 (8–6)	9th	2017	C
Minnesota	St. Thomas (MN)	22–4 (18–2)	19th	2017	C
Wisconsin	UW–La Crosse	17–9 (10–4)	2nd	2006	C
Wisconsin	UW–Oshkosh	23–3 (13–1)	9th	2018	C
CCIW	Wheaton (IL)	19–8 (11–5)	11th	2014	C
NESCAC	Williams	20–6 (6–4)	17th	2018	C
North Coast	Wooster	23–5 (16–2)	28th	2018	C
Capital	York (PA)	21–7 (12–2)	6th	2018	C

== Tournament bracket ==
=== Top-left - Clinton, New York ===
First round March 1 Campus Sites
Whitman	102
Texas Lutheran	79
Walla Walla, WA
Pomona–Pitzer	58
Texas–Dallas	37
Williams	86
Husson	60
Williamstown, MA
Plattsburgh State	65
Gwynedd Mercy	73
Christopher Newport	85
Albertus Magnus	59
Newport News, VA
Ramapo	76
Alfred	92
Hamilton	72
Penn State Behrend	70
Clinton, NY
Keene State	65
Moravian	86

Second round March 2 Campus Sites
Whitman	83
Pomona–Pitzer	74
Williams	90
Gwynedd Mercy	56
Christopher Newport	88
Alfred	53
Hamilton	83
Moravian	72

Sectional Semifinals; March 8 Clinton, NY
Whitman	81
Williams	84
Christopher Newport	75
Hamilton	67

Sectional Final; March 9 Clinton, NY
Williams	70
Christopher Newport	79

=== Bottom-left - Amherst, Massachusetts ===
First round March 1 Campus Sites
Amherst	84
Rosemont	53
Rochester, NY (Note: Pod hosted by Rochester due to Amherst hosting first and second round games in the 2019 NCAA Division III women's basketball tournament.)
Rochester	85
Farmingdale State	68
Rowan	96
Emerson	79
Glassboro, NJ
Nichols	74
Middlebury	71
Swarthmore	90
Mitchell	73
Swarthmore, PA
MIT	90
Skidmore	67
Randolph–Macon	95
Morrisville State	70
Ashland, VA
York (PA)	83
DeSales	59

Second round March 2 Campus Sites
Amherst	75
Rochester	67
Rowan	76
Nichols	87
Swarthmore	105
MIT	65
Randolph–Macon	78
York (PA)	60

Sectional Semifinals; March 8 Amherst, MA
Amherst	58
Nichols	62
Swarthmore	58
Randolph–Macon	57

Sectional Final; March 9 Amherst, MA
Nichols	65
Swarthmore	69

=== Top-right - Oshkosh, Wisconsin ===
First round March 1 Campus Sites
Nebraska Wesleyan	101
Eureka	75
Lincoln, NE
St. Thomas (MN)	80
UW–La Crosse	66
Guilford	97
Sewanee	59
Greensboro, NC
Wittenberg	100
Emory	88
UW–Oshkosh	86
Lake Forest	62
Collegeville, MN (Note: Pod hosted by St. John's due to UW–Oshkosh hosting first and second round games in the 2019 NCAA Division III women's basketball tournament.)
St. John's (MN)	78
Northwestern–St. Paul	93
North Central (IL)	77
Chatham	48
Naperville, IL
Loras	75
Albion	64

Second round March 2 Campus Sites
Nebraska Wesleyan	58
St. Thomas (MN)	70
Guilford	70
Wittenberg	61
UW–Oshkosh	108
Northwestern–St. Paul	86
North Central (IL)	82
Loras	84

Sectional Semifinals; March 8 Oshkosh, WI
St. Thomas (MN)	73
Guilford	80
UW–Oshkosh	86
Loras	75

Sectional Final; March 9 Oshkosh, WI
Guilford	79
UW–Oshkosh	82

=== Bottom-right - Rock Island, Illinois ===
First round March 1 Campus Sites
Augustana (IL)	93
Aurora	67
Rock Island, IL
Capital	78
UW–Platteville	76
Wooster	81
Baruch	57
Wooster, OH
Wheaton (IL)	84
Hanover	73
Marietta	101
Maryville (TN)	77
Marietta, OH
New Jersey City	60
Arcadia	80
Oswego State	72
Salem State	59
Oswego, NY
Baldwin Wallace	75
Salisbury	61

Second round March 2 Campus Sites
Augustana (IL)	85
Capital	79
Wooster	70
Wheaton (IL)	78
Marietta	88
Arcadia	76
Oswego State	75
Baldwin Wallace	71

Sectional Semifinals; March 8 Rock Island, IL
Augustana (IL)	79
Wheaton (IL)	93
Marietta	78
Oswego State	61

Sectional Final; March 9 Rock Island, IL
Wheaton (IL)	91
Marietta	87

== Final Four ==
National semifinal March 15; Fort Wayne, IN
Christopher Newport	63
Swarthmore	70
Fort Wayne, IN
UW–Oshkosh	104
Wheaton (IL)	85

National championship March 16; Fort Wayne, IN
Swarthmore	82
UW–Oshkosh	96

== See also ==
- 2019 NCAA Division I men's basketball tournament
- 2019 NCAA Division II men's basketball tournament
- 2019 NCAA Division I women's basketball tournament
- 2019 National Invitation Tournament
- 2019 Women's National Invitation Tournament
- 2019 NAIA Division I men's basketball tournament
- 2019 NAIA Division II men's basketball tournament
- 2019 NAIA Division I women's basketball tournament
