= 2013–14 WPI Engineers men's basketball team =

American college basketball season

2013–14 WPI Engineers men's basketball
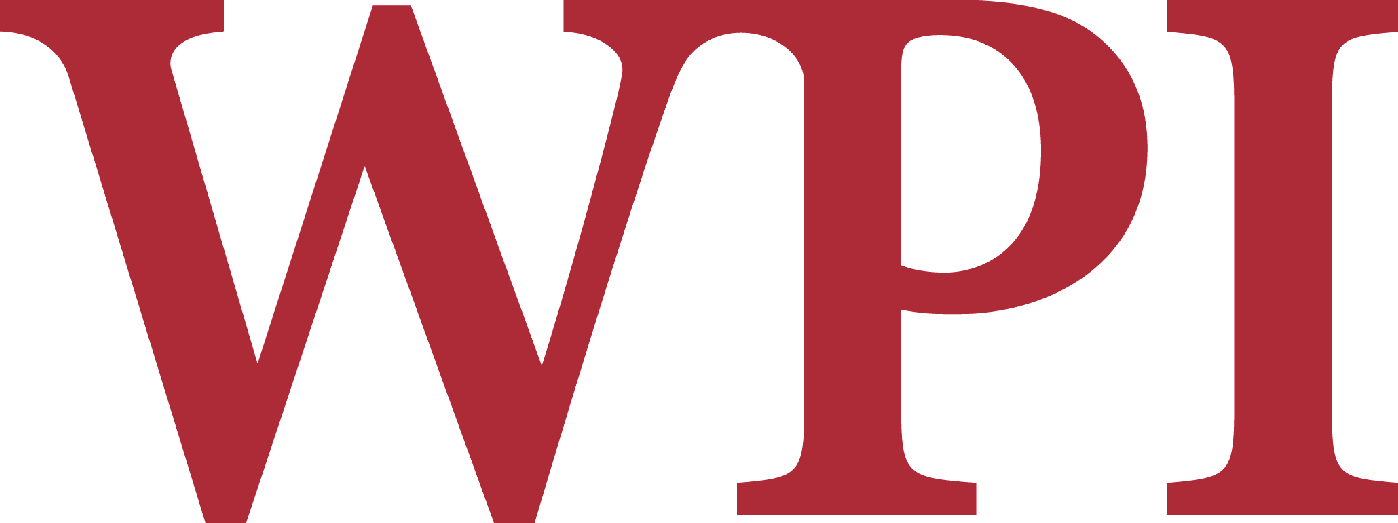

NEWMAC regular season champions

NCAA tournament, First round
- Conference: New England Women's and Men's Athletic Conference

Ranking
- Coaches: No. 25 (D3Hoops.com)
- Record: 22–5 (12–2 NEWMAC)
- Head coach: Chris Bartley (13th season)
- Home arena: Harrington Auditorium

The 2013–14 WPI Engineers men's basketball team represented Worcester Polytechnic Institute during the 2013–14 NCAA Division III men's basketball season. They were coached by a 16-year coaching veteran, Chris Bartely. The Engineers played their home games at Harrington Auditorium in Worcester, Massachusetts and were a part of the New England Women's and Men's Athletic Conference.
