= 2017 NCAA Division III men's basketball tournament =

American collegiate men's basketball tournament (2017)

- Teams: 64
- Finals site: , Salem Civic Center; Salem, Virginia
- Champions: Babson Beavers (1st title)
- Runner-up: Augustana Vikings (4th title game)
- Semifinalists: Whitman Blues (1st Final Four); Williams Ephs (4th Final Four)

The 2017 NCAA Division III men's basketball tournament is a single-elimination tournament involving 64 teams to determine the men's collegiate basketball national champion of National Collegiate Athletic Association (NCAA) Division III. The tournament concluded with the national semifinal and championship rounds that took place at the Salem Civic Center in Salem, Virginia.

Babson beat Augustana (IL) 79-78 to win their 1st national title. Joey Flannery was voted as the MVP of the tournament.

== Qualifying teams ==
=== Automatic bids (43) ===
The following 43 teams were automatic qualifiers for the 2017 NCAA field by virtue of winning their conference's automatic bid (except for the UAA, whose regular-season champion received the automatic bid).

Automatic bids
Conference	Team	Record (Conf.)	Appearance	Last bid
Allegheny Mountain	Medaille	21–7 (16–2)	5th	2015
American Southwest	Hardin–Simmons	24–7 (13–3)	2nd	2016
Capital	Christopher Newport	27–3 (17–1)	21st	2016
Centennial	Swarthmore	23–6 (14–4)	1st	Never
CUNYAC	Staten Island	21–6 (16–0)	12th	2013
CCIW	North Central (IL)	18–11 (9–7)	9th	2016
Colonial States	Neumann	25–3 (17–1)	2nd	2015
Commonwealth Coast	Nichols	24–6 (15–3)	1st	Never
Empire 8	St. John Fisher	23–6 (15–1)	16th	2015
Great Northeast	Albertus Magnus	23–5 (16–2)	6th	2015
Heartland	Hanover	26–4 (16–2)	7th	2011
Iowa	Wartburg	21–10 (8–8)	7th	2001
Landmark	Scranton	22–7 (11–3)	28th	2016
Liberty	Union (NY)	17–11 (10–6)	4th	2005
Little East	Eastern Connecticut	21–9 (11–3)	7th	2015
MAC Commonwealth	Lycoming	24–5 (13–3)	7th	2016
MAC Freedom	Misericordia	20–8 (9–5)	3rd	2015
MASCAC	Salem State	17–11 (9–3)	24th	2012
Michigan	Calvin	17–11 (10–4)	21st	2015
Midwest	Ripon	20–5 (15–3)	13th	2002
Minnesota	Bethel (MN)	20–6 (15–5)	2nd	1991
NECC	Becker	19–9 (13–3)	3rd	2012
NESCAC	Middlebury	27–4 (8–2)	8th	2016
NEWMAC	MIT	21–7 (11–3)	7th	2014
New Jersey	Ramapo	25–2 (16–2)	7th	2013
North Atlantic	Husson	21–7 (16–2)	6th	2016
North Coast	Wooster	21–8 (15–3)	26th	2016
NEAC	Morrisville State	22–7 (15–3)	4th	2014
Northern Athletics	Benedictine (IL)	23–5 (19–1)	8th	2016
Northwest	Whitman	27–0 (16–0)	2nd	2016
Ohio	Marietta	26–5 (16–2)	6th	2016
Old Dominion	Guilford	24–6 (13–3)	5th	2010
Presidents'	Thomas More	22–7 (15–3)	2nd	2009
Skyline	Farmingdale State	20–8 (14–2)	5th	2012
Southern	Rhodes	17–11 (11–3)	4th	1993
SCIAC	Claremont–Mudd–Scripps	23–5 (13–3)	13th	2015
SCAC	Texas Lutheran	19–10 (10–4)	3rd	2016
SLIAC	Westminster (MO)	19–9 (13–5)	5th	2016
SUNYAC	Oswego State	21–7 (15–3)	5th	2016
UAA	Washington–St. Louis	21–6 (12–2)	20th	2015
Upper Midwest	Northwestern–St. Paul	20–8 (13–3)	7th	2016
USA South	LaGrange	18–11 (8–6)	4th	2016
Wisconsin	UW–River Falls	25–4 (12–2)	3rd	2012

=== At-large bids (21) ===
The following 21 teams were awarded qualification for the 2017 NCAA field by the NCAA Division III Men's Basketball Committee. The committee evaluated teams on the basis of their win-loss percentage, strength of schedule, head-to-head results, results against common opponents, and results against teams included in the NCAA's final regional rankings.

At-large bids
Conference	Team	Record (Conf.)	Appearance	Last bid
NESCAC	Amherst	17–8 (7–3)	19th	2016
CCIW	Augustana (IL)	24–9 (11–5)	16th	2016
NEWMAC	Babson	31–2 (14–0)	9th	2016
Colonial States	Cabrini	19–8 (15–3)	13th	2014
UAA	Emory	19–8 (9–5)	6th	2016
Commonwealth Coast	Endicott	24–7 (15–3)	8th	2016
Michigan	Hope	23–7 (13–1)	26th	2016
Little East	Keene State	22–10 (10–4)	5th	2016
New Jersey	New Jersey City	21–8 (13–5)	17th	2011
UAA	Rochester	24–5 (10–4)	15th	2013
Liberty	St. Lawrence	20–7 (13–3)	13th	2010
Minnesota	St. Thomas (MN)	19–8 (15–5)	18th	2016
Capital	Salisbury	20–8 (14–4)	8th	2016
Liberty	Skidmore	20–8 (14–2)	5th	2016
Landmark	Susquehanna	23–6 (11–3)	7th	2016
NESCAC	Tufts	22–7 (8–2)	5th	2016
Wisconsin	UW–Oshkosh	17–11 (9–5)	7th	2016
Wisconsin	UW–Whitewater	22–7 (9–5)	21st	2015
NESCAC	Wesleyan (CT)	19–7 (6–4)	2nd	2015
Northwest	Whitworth	23–5 (13–3)	12th	2016
NESCAC	Williams	23–9 (5–5)	15th	2014

== Tournament bracket ==
=== Top-left - Marietta, Ohio ===
First round March 3 Campus Sites
Whitman	111
Rhodes	98
Walla Walla, WA
Whitworth	73
Claremont–Mudd–Scripps	78
Hardin–Simmons	109
LaGrange	103
Abilene, TX
Emory	82
Texas Lutheran	69
Marietta	83
Calvin	66
Marietta, OH
Guilford	74
Thomas More	54
Rochester	89
Albertus Magnus	66
Rochester, NY
Wesleyan (CT)	83
Union (NY)	89

Second round March 4 Campus Sites
Whitman	79
Claremont–Mudd–Scripps	73
Hardin–Simmons	95
Emory	85
Marietta	88
Guilford	64
Rochester	82
Union (NY)	60

Sectionals; March 10; Marietta, OH
Whitman	102
Hardin–Simmons	82
Marietta	80
Rochester	85

Sectionals; March 11; Marietta, OH
Whitman	91
Rochester	87

=== Bottom-left - Babson Park, Massachusetts ===
First round March 3 Campus Sites
Swarthmore	86
Staten Island	61
Swarthmore, PA
Christopher Newport	81
Morrisville State	45
Ramapo	73
Misericordia	63
Mahwah, NJ
Amherst	66
Keene State	69
Babson	92
Husson	76
Babson Park, MA
Skidmore	75
New Jersey City	67
St. John Fisher	77
St. Lawrence	72
Pittsford, NY
Tufts	84
Salem State	81

Second round March 4 Campus Sites
Swarthmore	67
Christopher Newport	77
Ramapo	91
Keene State	92*
Babson	72
Skidmore	65
St. John Fisher	81
Tufts	94

Sectionals; March 10; Babson Park, MA
Christopher Newport	64
Keene State	68
Babson	87
Tufts	80

Sectionals; March 11; Babson Park, MA
Keene State	79
Babson	102

=== Top-right - Middlebury, Vermont ===
First round March 3 Campus Sites
Middlebury	84
Farmingdale State	75
Middlebury, VT
Lycoming	86
Cabrini	70
Neumann	93
Nichols	96
Aston, PA
Salisbury	68
Endicott	71
Susquehanna	89
Medaille	82
Selinsgrove, PA
Eastern Connecticut	86
MIT	70
Williams	91
Becker	63
Williamstown, MA
Scranton	82*
Oswego State	77

Second round March 4 Campus Sites
Middlebury	95
Lycoming	76
Nichols	75
Endicott	111
Susquehanna	72
Eastern Connecticut	67
Williams	80
Scranton	53

Sectionals; March 10; Middlebury, VT
Middlebury	89
Endicott	60
Susquehanna	61
Williams	78

Sectionals; March 11; Middlebury, VT
Middlebury	75
Williams	79

=== Bottom-right - Holland, Michigan ===
First round March 3 Campus Sites
UW–River Falls	94**
Bethel (MN)	92
River Falls, WI
Benedictine (IL)	66
Wartburg	92
UW–Whitewater	85
Northwestern–St. Paul	81
Whitewater, WI
Augustana (IL)	77
St. Thomas (MN)	74
Hope	87
UW–Oshkosh	85
Holland, MI
Washington–St. Louis	87
Ripon	72
Hanover	72
Westminster (MO)	64
Hanover, IN
Wooster	72
North Central (IL)	77

Second round March 4 Campus Sites
UW–River Falls	43
Wartburg	76
UW–Whitewater	70
Augustana (IL)	72
Hope	94
Washington–St. Louis	80
Hanover	64
North Central (IL)	63

Sectionals; March 10; Holland, MI
Wartburg	69
Augustana (IL)	80
Hope	77
Hanover	79

Sectionals; March 11; Holland, MI
Augustana (IL)	77
Hanover	64

=== Final Four - Salem, Virginia ===
Semifinals; Friday, March 17
Whitman	85
Babson	91
Williams	79
Augustana (IL)	90

National championship Saturday, March 18
Babson	79
Augustana (IL)	78

== See also ==
- 2017 NCAA Division I men's basketball tournament
- 2017 NCAA Division II men's basketball tournament
