= St. Thomas Tommies (Minnesota) men's basketball =

St. Thomas (Minnesota) Tommies men's basketball
2026–27 St. Thomas Tommies (Minnesota) men's basketball team
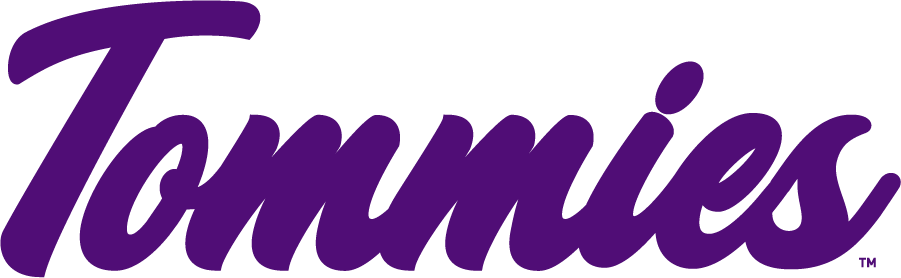
- University: University of St. Thomas
- First season: 1904
- Head coach: John Tauer (16th season)
- Location: Saint Paul, Minnesota
- Arena: Lee & Penny Anderson Arena (capacity: 5,000)
- Conference: Summit League
- Nickname: Tommies
- Colors: Purple and gray

NCAA Division III tournament champions
- 2011, 2016
Other NCAA Division III tournament results
Runner-up	2013
Final Four	1994, 2011, 2013, 2016
Appearances	1990, 1993, 1994, 1995, 2000, 2002, 2006, 2007, 2008, 2009, 2010, 2011, 2012, 2013, 2014, 2015, 2016, 2017, 2019

Conference tournament champions
- MIAC: 1990, 1993, 1994, 1995, 2002, 2006, 2007, 2008, 2009, 2011, 2012, 2013, 2015

Conference regular-season champions
- MIAC: 1924, 1946, 1949, 1966, 1967, 1970, 1971, 1972, 1973, 1974, 1981, 1989, 1990, 1991, 1992, 1994, 1995, 2000, 2002, 2003, 2006, 2007, 2008, 2009, 2010, 2011, 2012, 2013, 2014, 2015, 2016, 2017, 2019, 2020

The St. Thomas Tommies men's basketball team represents the University of St. Thomas, located in Saint Paul, Minnesota, in NCAA Division I as a member of the Summit League where they have been a member since their Division I debut in the 2021–22 season. The Tommies are led by fourteenth-year coach John Tauer. St. Thomas has never appeared in the NCAA Division I men's basketball tournament since attaining eligibility before the 2025–26 season.

The team played its games at Schoenecker Arena (located within the Anderson Athletics and Recreation Center on campus) in Saint Paul from 2010 to 2025, hosting the arena's final basketball game on March 1, 2025, which resulted in a 61–55 win against the Kansas City Roos. Starting in the 2025–26 season, the team will play their games at Lee & Penny Anderson Arena, sharing the space with the women's basketball team as well as both the men's and women's hockey teams.

== Postseason results ==
=== NCAA Division III Tournament results ===
The Tommies have appeared in nineteen NCAA Division III Tournaments. Their combined record is 31–18.

Year	Round	Opponent	Result
1990	First Round; Second Round; Sectional Third Place	Dubuque; DePauw; Nebraska Wesleyan	W, 65–55; L, 69–75 ^{2OT} W, 77–71
1993	Second Round; Sectional Semifinals	Saint John's (MN); Wisconsin–Platteville	W, 75–61; L, 60–70
1994	First Round; Sectional Semifinals; Sectional Championship; Semifinals; Third Place	Central (IA); Hampden–Sydney; Greensboro; NYU; Wittenberg	W, 73–62; W, 80–66; W, 84–74; L, 68–75; L, 62–73
1995	Second Round	Nebraska Wesleyan	L, 74–94
2000	First Round; Second Round	Nebraska Wesleyan; Buena Vista	W, 80–58; L, 66–69
2002	Second Round	Wisconsin–Oshkosh	L, 85–88 ^{OT}
2006	First Round; Second Round	North Central (IL); Lawrence	W, 76–68; L, 59–63
2007	Second Round	Carroll (WI)	L, 80–86
2008	First Round	Buena Vista	L, 70–72
2009	First Round; Second Round; Sectional Semifinals; Sectional Championship	Aurora; Wisconsin–Stevens Point; Puget Sound; Washington–St. Louis	W, 96–73; W, 53–30; W, 86–69; L, 64–79
2010	First Round	Anderson (IN)	L, 71–73
2011	First Round; Second Round; Sectional Semifinals; Sectional Championship; National Semifinals; National Championship	Northwestern–St. Paul; Illinois Wesleyan; Wisconsin–Stevens Point; Augustana (IL); Middlebury; Wooster	W, 70–60; W, 78–70; W, 66–64; W, 72–56; W, 59–57; W, 78–54
2012	First Round; Second Round	Claremont-Mudd-Scripps; Wisconsin–Whitewater	W, 76–74 ^{OT} L, 62–91
2013	First Round; Second Round; Sectional Semifinals; Sectional Championship; National Semifinals	Aurora; Wheaton (IL); Calvin; Williams; Mary Hardin–Baylor	W, 91–62; W, 68–58; W, 63–62; W, 82–79; L, 67–74
2014	First Round	Augustana (IL)	L, 77–88
2015	First Round	Northwestern–St. Paul	L, 70–71
2016	First Round; Second Round; Sectional Semifinals; Sectional Championship; National Semifinals; National Championship	Central (IA); Elmhurst; Whitman; Augustana (IL); Christopher Newport; Benedictine (IL)	W, 78–66; W, 94–81; W, 99–73; W, 86–76; W, 66–62; W, 82–76
2017	First Round	Augustana (IL)	L, 74–77
2019	First Round; Second Round; Sectional Semifinals	Wisconsin–La Crosse; Nebraska Wesleyan; Guilford	W, 80–66; W, 70–58; L, 73–80

=== NIT results ===
The Tommies have appeared in the National Invitation Tournament (NIT) once. Their record is 0–1.

Year	Round	Opponent	Result
2026	First Round	Seattle	L 52–67
