= 2016 NCAA Division III men's basketball tournament =

American collegiate men's basketball tournament (2016)

- Teams: 62
- Finals site: , Salem Civic Center; Salem, Virginia
- Champions: St. Thomas (MN) (2nd title)
- Runner-up: Benedictine (1st title game)
- Semifinalists: Amherst (7th Final Four); Christopher Newport (1st Final Four)

The 2016 NCAA Division III men's basketball tournament was a single-elimination tournament involving 62 teams to determine the men's collegiate basketball national champion of National Collegiate Athletic Association (NCAA) Division III. The tournament took place during March 2016, with the national semifinal and championship rounds taking place at the Salem Civic Center in Salem, Virginia.

St. Thomas (MN) defeated Benedictine (IL), 82–76, to win their second Division III national championship.

== Qualifying teams ==
=== Automatic bids (43) ===
The following 43 teams were automatic qualifiers for the 2016 NCAA field by virtue of winning their conference's automatic bid (except for the UAA, whose regular-season champion received the automatic bid).

Automatic bids
Conference	Team	Record (Conf.)	Appearance	Last bid
Allegheny Mountain	Pitt–Greensburg	19–9 (13–5)	1st	Never
American Southwest	Hardin–Simmons	18–10 (8–6)	1st	Never
Capital	Christopher Newport	26–1 (18–0)	20th	2013
Centennial	Franklin & Marshall	22–5 (15–3)	24th	2012
CUNYAC	Brooklyn	22–6 (11–5)	4th	2010
CCIW	Augustana (IL)	26–1 (13–1)	15th	2015
Colonial States	Gwynedd Mercy	21–6 (17–1)	5th	2011
Commonwealth Coast	Endicott	18–10 (12–6)	7th	2015
Empire 8	Hartwick	19–8 (12–4)	8th	2014
Great Northeast	Johnson & Wales (RI)	26–2 (17–1)	3rd	2011
Heartland	Mount St. Joseph	18–9 (13–5)	1st	Never
Iowa	Central (IA)	19–9 (7–7)	11th	2014
Landmark	Catholic	22–5 (13–3)	14th	2015
Liberty	Skidmore	18–8 (11–5)	4th	2015
Little East	Keene State	18–10 (8–6)	4th	2015
MAC Commonwealth	Lycoming	19–9 (8–8)	6th	2010
MAC Freedom	Delaware Valley	20–7 (9–5)	3rd	2013
MASCAC	Fitchburg State	18–9 (9–3)	2nd	2013
Michigan	Alma	21–6 (12–2)	1st	Never
Midwest	St. Norbert	26–2 (18–0)	8th	2015
Minnesota	St. Olaf	18–9 (14–6)	3rd	2015
NECC	Southern Vermont	24–3 (16–0)	2nd	2003
NESCAC	Middlebury	17–10 (6–4)	7th	2013
NEWMAC	Babson	21–5 (13–1)	8th	2015
New Jersey	Stockton	21–6 (14–4)	16th	2015
North Atlantic	Husson	21–6 (15–3)	5th	2014
North Coast	Denison	17–11 (9–9)	2nd	1997
NEAC	Lancaster Bible	27–0 (18–0)	1st	Never
Northern Athletics	Benedictine (IL)	27–0 (20–0)	7th	2011
Northwest	Whitworth	26–1 (15–1)	11th	2015
Ohio	John Carroll	25–3 (15–3)	14th	2015
Old Dominion	Lynchburg	22–6 (12–4)	3rd	1979
Presidents'	Saint Vincent	22–6 (15–3)	4th	2015
Skyline	Old Westbury	19–8 (16–4)	2nd	2004
Southern	Birmingham–Southern	22–6 (14–0)	2nd	2012
SCIAC	Chapman	20–6 (12–4)	4th	2014
SCAC	Texas Lutheran	21–6 (11–3)	2nd	2015
SLIAC	Westminster (MO)	12–15 (10–8)	4th	2012
SUNYAC	SUNY Cortland	20–7 (12–6)	6th	2013
UAA	Emory	18–7 (11–3)	5th	2015
Upper Midwest	Northwestern–St. Paul	22–5 (12–4)	6th	2015
USA South	Covenant	18–9 (10–4)	1st	Never
Wisconsin	UW–Oshkosh	18–9 (9–5)	6th	2003

=== At-large bids (19) ===
The following 19 teams were awarded qualification for the 2016 NCAA field by the NCAA Division III Men's Basketball Committee. The committee evaluated teams on the basis of their win-loss percentage, strength of schedule, head-to-head results, results against common opponents, and results against teams included in the NCAA's final regional rankings.

At-large bids
Conference	Team	Record (Conf.)	Appearance	Last bid
NESCAC	Amherst	22–5 (8–2)	18th	2015
CCIW	Elmhurst	21–6 (10–4)	5th	2015
Michigan	Hope	23–3 (13–1)	25th	2014
USA South	LaGrange	20–9 (9–5)	3rd	2015
Ohio	Marietta	25–3 (17–1)	5th	2015
CCIW	North Central (IL)	19–7 (12–2)	8th	2013
UAA	NYU	20–5 (9–5)	10th	2012
North Coast	Ohio Wesleyan	23–4 (15–3)	7th	2015
SUNYAC	Oswego State	20–8 (11–7)	4th	2015
SUNYAC	Plattsburgh State	21–5 (16–2)	9th	2014
Minnesota	St. Thomas (MN)	24–3 (18–2)	17th	2015
Capital	Salisbury	21–6 (13–5)	7th	2015
Landmark	Scranton	19–7 (11–5)	27th	2015
Landmark	Susquehanna	23–4 (13–3)	6th	1994
NESCAC	Trinity (CT)	19–7 (9–1)	9th	2015
NESCAC	Tufts	20–6 (7–3)	4th	2006
Northwest	Whitman	22–4 (14–2)	1st	Never
North Coast	Wooster	21–7 (15–3)	25th	2015
NEWMAC	WPI	20–6 (10–4)	12th	2015

== Tournament bracket ==
=== Top-left - Lisle, Illinois ===
First round March 3–4; Campus Sites
Seguin, TX / Lisle, IL
Texas Lutheran	81
Hardin–Simmons	97
Ohio Wesleyan	114
Pitt–Greensburg	68
Delaware, OH
Lynchburg	82
Scranton	55
St. Norbert	77
Northwestern–St. Paul	58
De Pere, WI
North Central (IL)	78
St. Olaf	80
John Carroll	99
Saint Vincent	85
University Heights, OH
Alma	74
Denison	60

Second round March 5 Campus Sites
Benedictine (IL)	85
Hardin–Simmons	64
Ohio Wesleyan	97
Lynchburg	94
St. Norbert	63
St. Olaf	61
John Carroll	83
Alma	90

Third round March 11; Lisle, IL
Benedictine (IL)	97
Ohio Wesleyan	84
St. Norbert	64
Alma	70

Regional finals March 12; Lisle, IL
Benedictine (IL)	93
Alma	73

=== Bottom-left - Medford, Massachusetts ===
First round March 3–4; Campus Sites
Amherst	74
Husson	72
Amherst, MA
WPI	50
SUNY Cortland	69
Susquehanna	77
Old Westbury	73
Selinsgrove, PA
Babson	80
Hartwick	69
Plattsburgh State	81
Fitchburg State	84
Plattsburgh, NY
Trinity (CT)	73
Johnson & Wales (RI)	75
Tufts	78
Southern Vermont	76
Medford, MA
Franklin & Marshall	72
Skidmore	83

Second round March 5 Campus Sites
Amherst	69
SUNY Cortland	68
Susquehanna	67
Babson	70
Fitchburg State	74
Johnson & Wales (RI)	86
Tufts	88
Skidmore	80

Third round March 11; Medford, MA
Amherst	88
Babson	76
Johnson & Wales (RI)	85
Tufts	101

Regional finals March 12; Medford, MA
Amherst	86
Tufts	73

=== Top-right - Rock Island, Illinois ===
First round March 3–4; Campus Sites
Augustana (IL)	105
Westminster (MO)	52
Rock Island, IL
Hope	98
Mount St. Joseph	87
Emory	76
Covenant	61
Atlanta, GA
LaGrange	88
Birmingham–Southern	93
St. Thomas (MN)	78
Central (IA)	66
Saint Paul, MN
Elmhurst	73
UW–Oshkosh	63
Whitman	91
Chapman	84
Walla Walla, WA / Spokane, WA

Second round March 5 Campus Sites
Augustana (IL)	96
Hope	80
Emory	84*
Birmingham–Southern	78
St. Thomas (MN)	94
Elmhurst	81
Whitman	88
Whitworth	86

Third round March 11; Rock Island, IL
Augustana (IL)	88
Emory	65
St. Thomas (MN)	99
Whitman	73

Regional finals March 12; Rock Island, IL
Augustana (IL)	76
St. Thomas (MN)	86

* – Denotes overtime period

=== Bottom-right - Oswego, New York ===
First round March 3–4; Campus Sites
Christopher Newport	79
Lycoming	71
Newport News, VA
Brooklyn	67
NYU	86
Stockton	71
Keene State	72*
Galloway Township, NJ
Salisbury	73
Middlebury	75
Marietta	85
Gwynedd Mercy	86
Marietta, OH
Oswego State	88*
Delaware Valley	78
Catholic	76
Endicott	84
Washington, D.C.
Wooster	96
Lancaster Bible	83

Second round March 5 Campus Sites
Christopher Newport	67
NYU	64
Keene State	72
Middlebury	71
Gwynedd Mercy	77
Oswego State	78
Endicott	83
Wooster	91*

Third round March 11; Oswego, NY
Christopher Newport	74
Keene State	62
Oswego State	65
Wooster	66

Regional finals March 12; Oswego, NY
Christopher Newport	81
Wooster	61

* – Denotes overtime period

=== Final Four - Salem, Virginia ===
Semifinals; Friday, March 18
Benedictine (IL)	63
Amherst	60
St. Thomas (MN)	66
Christopher Newport	62

National championship Saturday, March 19
Benedictine (IL)	76
St. Thomas (MN)	82

Bracket:
Records Book:

== All-Tournament Team ==
Taylor Montero - St. Thomas (MN) (Most Outstanding Player)
Ryan Saarela - St. Thomas (MN)
Grant Schafer - St. Thomas (MN)
Luke Johnson - Benedictine
Connor Green - Amherst

== See also ==
- 2016 NCAA Division I men's basketball tournament
- 2016 NCAA Division II men's basketball tournament
