= 2015 NCAA Division III men's basketball tournament =

American collegiate men's basketball tournament (2015)

- Teams: 62
- Finals site: , Salem Civic Center; Salem, Virginia
- Champions: Wisconsin–Stevens Point Pointers (4th title)
- Runner-up: Augustana (IL) Vikings (3rd title game)
- Semifinalists: Babson Beavers (1st Final Four); Virginia Wesleyan Marlins (3rd Final Four)

The 2015 NCAA Division III men's basketball tournament was a single-elimination tournament involving 62 teams to determine the men's collegiate basketball national champion of National Collegiate Athletic Association (NCAA) Division III. The tournament took place during March 2015, with the national semifinal and championship rounds taking place at the Salem Civic Center in Salem, Virginia.

Wisconsin–Stevens Point defeated Augustana (IL), 70–54, to win their fourth Division III national championship.

== Qualifying teams ==
=== Automatic bids (43) ===
The following 43 teams were automatic qualifiers for the 2015 NCAA field by virtue of winning their conference's automatic bid (except for the UAA, whose regular-season champion received the automatic bid).

Automatic bids
Conference	Team	Record (Conf.)	Appearance	Last bid
Allegheny Mountain	Medaille	19–7 (14–4)	4th	2012
American Southwest	East Texas Baptist	23–5 (15–5)	1st	Never
Capital	Salisbury	20–7 (14–4)	6th	1997
Centennial	Dickinson	22–5 (13–5)	7th	2014
CUNYAC	Baruch	21–6 (14–2)	4th	2009
CCIW	Augustana (IL)	23–4 (11–3)	14th	2014
Colonial States	Neumann	17–10 (12–6)	1st	Never
Commonwealth Coast	Endicott	23–5 (16–2)	6th	2012
Empire 8	St. John Fisher	23–4 (14–2)	15th	2010
Great Northeast	Albertus Magnus	27–1 (18–0)	5th	2014
Heartland	Defiance	21–6 (14–4)	5th	2010
Iowa	Dubuque	23–5 (10–4)	6th	2013
Landmark	Scranton	22–5 (14–2)	26th	2014
Liberty	Skidmore	19–7 (14–2)	3rd	2012
Little East	Keene State	20–8 (8–6)	3rd	2007
MAC Commonwealth	Alvernia	18–9 (10–6)	10th	2014
MAC Freedom	Misericordia	21–6 (11–3)	2nd	2012
MASCAC	Westfield State	20–6 (11–1)	3rd	1993
Michigan	Calvin	21–6 (12–2)	20th	2014
Midwest	St. Norbert	24–1 (18–0)	7th	2014
Minnesota	St. Thomas (MN)	24–3 (17–3)	16th	2014
NECC	Regis (MA)	19–8 (12–4)	1st	Never
NESCAC	Wesleyan (CT)	19–8 (5–5)	1st	Never
NEWMAC	Babson	25–2 (13–1)	7th	2014
New Jersey	Stockton	22–5 (14–4)	15th	2014
North Atlantic	Colby–Sawyer	19–6 (15–3)	4th	2003
North Coast	DePauw	19–9 (9–9)	13th	2007
NEAC	SUNY Cobleskill	17–10 (13–4)	1st	Never
Northern Athletics	Concordia (WI)	19–9 (14–6)	3rd	2011
Northwest	Whitworth	24–3 (15–1)	10th	2014
Ohio	Mount Union	22–6 (15–3)	2nd	1997
Old Dominion	Randolph–Macon	26–2 (16–0)	15th	2014
Presidents'	Saint Vincent	22–6 (14–2)	3rd	2014
Skyline	Sage	23–4 (15–3)	1st	Never
Southern	Hendrix	12–16 (4–10)	3rd	1996
SCIAC	Claremont–Mudd–Scripps	21–6 (12–4)	12th	2012
SCAC	Texas Lutheran	18–9 (11–3)	1st	Never
SLIAC	Spalding	18–9 (13–5)	2nd	2013
SUNYAC	Oswego State	19–9 (12–6)	3rd	2012
UAA	Emory	20–5 (10–4)	4th	2014
Upper Midwest	Northwestern–St. Paul	18–9 (14–0)	5th	2014
USA South	LaGrange	17–11 (7–7)	2nd	2014
Wisconsin	UW–Whitewater	24–3 (15–1)	20th	2014

=== At-large bids (19) ===
The following 19 teams were awarded qualification for the 2015 NCAA field by the NCAA Division III Men's Basketball Committee. The committee evaluated teams on the basis of their win-loss percentage, strength of schedule, head-to-head results, results against common opponents, and results against teams included in the NCAA's final regional rankings.

At-large bids
Conference	Team	Record (Conf.)	Appearance	Last bid
NESCAC	Amherst	20–7 (6–4)	17th	2014
NESCAC	Bates	19–6 (7–3)	1st	Never
Landmark	Catholic	22–5 (15–1)	13th	2013
Little East	Eastern Connecticut	22–5 (13–1)	6th	2014
CCIW	Elmhurst	19–7 (9–5)	4th	2009
CCIW	Illinois Wesleyan	19–8 (10–4)	24th	2014
Ohio	John Carroll	20–6 (15–3)	13th	2010
Centennial	Johns Hopkins	23–4 (16–2)	10th	2014
Ohio	Marietta	25–3 (16–2)	4th	2013
North Coast	Ohio Wesleyan	22–5 (16–2)	6th	2014
Minnesota	St. Olaf	21–5 (16–4)	2nd	2014
NEWMAC	Springfield	19–8 (10–4)	8th	2014
NESCAC	Trinity (CT)	20–6 (9–1)	8th	2008
Wisconsin	UW–Stevens Point	21–5 (15–1)	14th	2014
Old Dominion	Virginia Wesleyan	23–5 (13–3)	15th	2014
UAA	Washington–St. Louis	20–5 (9–5)	19th	2014
New Jersey	William Paterson	20–7 (13–5)	16th	2012
North Coast	Wooster	22–6 (14–4)	24th	2014
NEWMAC	WPI	21–5 (11–3)	11th	2014

== Tournament bracket ==
=== Top-left - Rock Island, Illinois ===
First round March 5–6; Campus Sites
St. Louis, MO / Rock Island, IL
Washington–St. Louis	73
DePauw	83
Mount Union	87
Neumann	59
Alliance, OH
Calvin	78
Oswego State	69
UW–Whitewater	71
Defiance	83
Whitewater, WI
Ohio Wesleyan	78
St. Olaf	90
Marietta	120
Medaille	81
Marietta, OH
Wooster	84
Misericordia	59

Second round March 7 Campus Sites
Augustana (IL)	68
DePauw	66
Mount Union	81
Calvin	69
Defiance	63
St. Olaf	68
Marietta	88
Wooster	86

Third round March 13; Rock Island, IL
Augustana (IL)	82
Mount Union	69
St. Olaf	72
Marietta	79

Regional finals March 14; Rock Island, IL
Augustana (IL)	100
Marietta	51

=== Bottom-left - Babson Park, Massachusetts ===
First round March 5–6; Campus Sites
Babson	75
Westfield State	62
Babson Park, MA
Scranton	72
Baruch	62
Johns Hopkins	95
Keene State	82
Baltimore, MD
Skidmore	81
Wesleyan (CT)	66
Stockton	81
Endicott	61
Galloway, NJ
Bates	92
Saint Vincent	80
Trinity (CT)	60
Colby–Sawyer	55
Hartford, CT
Eastern Connecticut	54
Salisbury	66

Second round March 7 Campus Sites
Babson	54
Scranton	47
Johns Hopkins	61
Skidmore	58
Stockton	59
Bates	68*
Trinity (CT)	60
Salisbury	47

Third round March 13; Babson Park, MA
Babson	49
Johns Hopkins	47
Bates	62
Trinity (CT)	79

Regional finals March 14; Babson Park, MA
Babson	76*
Trinity (CT)	69

=== Top-right - Ashland, Virginia ===
First round March 5–6; Campus Sites
Washington, D.C. / Ashland, VA
Catholic	87
Alvernia	80
St. John Fisher	76
WPI	70
Rochester, NY
Amherst	91
Sage	67
Dickinson	74
Regis (MA)	64
Carlisle, PA
Albertus Magnus	68
Springfield	58
William Paterson	80
SUNY Cobleskill	54
Wayne, NJ
Virginia Wesleyan	101
John Carroll	86

Second round March 7 Campus Sites
Randolph–Macon	78
Catholic	65
St. John Fisher	87
Amherst	70
Dickinson	74
Albertus Magnus	72
William Paterson	74
Virginia Wesleyan	77

Third round March 13; Ashland, VA
Randolph–Macon	64
St. John Fisher	57
Dickinson	65
Virginia Wesleyan	75

Regional finals March 14; Ashland, VA
Randolph–Macon	47
Virginia Wesleyan	49

=== Bottom-right - Stevens Point, Wisconsin ===
First round March 5–6; Campus Sites
St. Thomas (MN)	70
Northwestern–St. Paul	71
De Pere, WI
St. Norbert	98
Elmhurst	110***
East Texas Baptist	75
Hendrix	59
Marshall, TX
Claremont–Mudd–Scripps	79
Texas Lutheran	55
UW–Stevens Point	88
Concordia (WI)	56
Stevens Point, WI
Illinois Wesleyan	72
Dubuque	53
Emory	88
Spalding	59
Atlanta, GA
Whitworth	88
LaGrange	60

Second round March 7 Campus Sites
Northwestern–St. Paul	84
Elmhurst	75
East Texas Baptist	80
Claremont–Mudd–Scripps	75
UW–Stevens Point	70
Illinois Wesleyan	53
Emory	85
Whitworth	84

Third round March 13; Stevens Point, WI
Northwestern–St. Paul	46
East Texas Baptist	70
UW–Stevens Point	73
Emory	53

Regional finals March 14; Stevens Point, WI
East Texas Baptist	28
UW–Stevens Point	45

=== Final Four - Salem, Virginia ===
Semifinals; Friday, March 20
Augustana (IL)	68
Babson	48
Virginia Wesleyan	59
UW–Stevens Point	68

National championship Saturday, March 21
Augustana (IL)	54
UW–Stevens Point	70

== See also ==
- 2015 NCAA Division I men's basketball tournament
- 2015 NCAA Division II men's basketball tournament
