= 2011 NCAA Division III men's basketball tournament =

American collegiate men's basketball tournament (2011)

- Teams: 61
- Finals site: , Salem, Virginia
- Champions: St. Thomas (MN) (1st title)
- Runner-up: Wooster (1st title game)
- Semifinalists: Middlebury (1st Final Four); Williams (6th Final Four)
- Winning coach: Steve Fritz (UST)
- MOP: Tyler Nicolai (UST)
- Attendance: 31,246

The 2011 NCAA Division III men's basketball tournament was a single-elimination tournament to determine the men's collegiate basketball national champion of National Collegiate Athletic Association (NCAA) Division III. The tournament began on March 3, 2011. The tournament consists of 61 teams arranged in four sections. The top three teams earn a bye to the second round. The other 58 teams compete in the first round. The first two rounds in each section are held at campus location: four sites per section. The third and fourth rounds take place at the sectional location. The national semifinals and national championship were held at the Salem Civic Center in Salem, Virginia.

Forty-two teams were granted automatic bids as the champion of their conference. One independent team was selected, and 18 teams were selected as at-large participants.

== Qualified teams ==
School	Conference	Record	Qualification
La Roche	Allegheny Mountain Collegiate	25–2	Automatic
McMurry	American Southwest	21–7	Automatic
St. Mary's (Md.)	Capital Athletic	22–5	Automatic
Franklin & Marshall	Centennial	22–5	Automatic
Medgar Evans	CUNY Athletic	17–11	Automatic
Augustana (Ill.)	Illinois and Wisconsin	24–3	Automatic
Cabrini	Colonial States Athletic	22–5	Automatic
Alvernia	Commonwealth	18–6	Automatic
Salve Regina	Commonwealth Coast	17–10	Automatic
Hartwick	Empire 8	17–10	Automatic
Delaware Valley	Freedom	17–10	Automatic
Johnson & Wales (R.I.)	Great Northeast Athletic	20–8	Automatic
Manchester	Heartland Collegiate Athletic	21–6	Automatic
Luther	Iowa Intercollegiate Athletic	18–8	Automatic
Scranton	Landmark	20–5	Automatic
Skidmore	Liberty League	18–9	Automatic
Rhode Island College	Little East	19–7	Automatic
Bridgewater State	Massachusetts State College Athletic	19–9	Automatic
Hope	Michigan Intercollegiate Athletic Association	22–6	Automatic
St. Norbert	Midwest	20–5	Automatic
St. Thomas (Minn.)	Minnesota Intercollegiate Athletic	24–3	Automatic
Elms	New England Collegiate	20–7	Automatic
Middlebury	New England Small College Athletic	25–1	Automatic
MIT	New England Women's and Men's Athletic	19–8	Automatic
New Jersey City	New Jersey Athletic	19–9	Automatic
Husson	North Atlantic	21–6	Automatic
Wooster	North Coast Athletic	26–2	Automatic
Wells	North Eastern Athletic	16–11	Automatic
Benedictine (Ill.)	Northern Athletics	21–7	Automatic
Whitworth	Northwest	26–1	Automatic
Marietta	Ohio Athletic	25–3	Automatic

School	Conference	Record	Qualification
Randolph–Macon	Old Dominion Athletic	24–4	Automatic
Bethany (W.Va.)	Presidents' Athletic	21–7	Automatic
Purchase	Skyline	23–4	Automatic
Webster	St. Louis Intercollegiate Athletic	20–6	Automatic
Redlands	Southern California Intercollegiate Athletic	16–11	Automatic
Centre	Southern Collegiate Athletic	21–5	Automatic
Buffalo State	SUNY Athletic	21–6	Automatic
Rochester (N.Y.)	University Athletic Association	20–5	Automatic
Northwestern (Minn.)	Upper Midwest Athletic	21–6	Automatic
North Carolina Wesleyan	USA South Athletic	21–6	Automatic
Wisconsin–Stevens Point	Wisconsin Intercollegiate Athletic	24–3	Automatic
Chapman	Independent	24–3	At-large
Amherst	New England Small College Athletic	22–3	At-large
Becker	North Atlantic	23–4	At-large
Concordia (Wis.)	Northern Athletics	23–4	At-large
Gwynedd–Mercy	Colonial States Athletic	21–6	At-large
Hanover	Heartland Collegiate Athletic	19–7	At-large
Illinois Wesleyan	Illinois & Wisconsin	19–8	At-large
Ithaca	Empire 8	20–6	At-large
Mary Hardin-Baylor	Southwest	21–7	At-large
Oswego State	SUNY Athletic	23–4	At-large
Penn State–Behrend	Allegheny Mountain Collegiate	23–4	At-large
Ramapo	New Jersey Athletic	20–6	At-large
Texas–Dallas	American Southwest	21–6	At-large
Virginia Wesleyan	Old Dominion Athletic	23–4	At-large
Western Connecticut State	Little East	21–5	At-large
Williams	New England Small College Athletic	25–2	At-large
Wisconsin–River Falls	Wisconsin Intercollegiate Athletic	20–7	At-large
Wittenberg	North Coast Athletic	19–8	At-large
WPI	New England Women's and Men's Athletic	22–5	At-large

== Sectional play ==
=== Wooster, Ohio Sectional ===
First round March 3 or 4
First round: Orange, California; Second round: Spokane, Washington
Chapman	62
Redlands	38
Marietta	67
Centre	62
Marietta, Ohio
La Roche	68
Wittenberg	74
Wooster	74
Benedictine (Ill.)	68
Wooster, Ohio
Manchester	70
Bethany (W.Va.)	58
Cabrini	85
New Jersey City	76
Radnor, Pennsylvania
Purchase	79
Hartwick	69

Second round March 5
Whitworth	77
Chapman	63
Marietta	63
Wittenberg	62
Wooster	47
Manchester	45
Cabrini	91
Purchase	84

Sectionals; March 11
Whitworth	93
Marietta	77
Wooster	94
Cabrini	77

Sectionals; March 12
Whitworth	66
Wooster	76

=== Williamstown, Massachusetts Sectional ===
First round March 3 or 4
Williams	86
Husson	83
Williamstown, Massachusetts
Becker	80
Scranton	73
Virginia Wesleyan	93
Delaware Valley	63
Norfolk, Virginia
Franklin & Marshall	69
NC Wesleyan	56
WPI	58
Bridgewater State	57
Worcester, Massachusetts
Amherst	79
Skidmore	39
Oswego State	64
Wells	58
Oswego, New York
Penn State-Behrend	54
Rhode Isl. College	83

Second round March 5
Williams	84
Becker	63
Virginia Wesleyan	79
Franklin & Marshall	71
WPI	70
Amherst	92
Oswego State	63
Rhode Isl. College	71

Sectionals; March 11
Williams	79
Virginia Wesleyan	73
Amherst	78
Rhode Isl. College	74

Sectionals; March 12
Williams	77
Amherst	71

=== Rock Island, Illinois Sectional ===
First round March 3 or 4
First round: Belton, Texas; Second round:Abilene, Texas
Mary Hardin-Baylor	86
Texas-Dallas	77
Augustana (Ill.)	76
Webster	51
Rock Island, Illinois
Hope	73
Hanover	70
Concordia (Wis.)	61
Luther	68
Mequon, Wisconsin
Wis.-Stevens Pt.	70
St. Norbert College	49
St. Thomas (MN)	70
Northwestern (Minn.)	60
Saint Paul, Minnesota
Wis.-River Falls	76
Illinois Wesleyan	83

Second round March 5
McMurry	67
Mary Hardin-Baylor	70
Augustana (Ill.)	88
Hope	80
Luther	56
Wis.-Stevens Pt.	76
St. Thomas (MN)	78
Ill. Wesleyan	70

Sectionals; March 11
Mary Hardin-Baylor	57
Augustana (Ill.)	70
Wis.-Stevens Pt.	64
St. Thomas (MN)	66

Sectionals; March 12
Augustana (Ill.)	56
St. Thomas (MN)	72

=== Rochester, New York Sectional ===
First round March 3 or 4
Ramapo	106
Johnson & Wales	114*
Mahwah, New Jersey
Gwynedd-Mercy	73
Buffalo State	83
St. Mary's (Md.)	72
Medgar Evers	55
St. Mary's City, Maryland
Randolph Macon	62
Alvernia	59
Ithaca	78
MIT	82
Ithaca, New York
Rochester (NY)	81
Elms	70
West Conn. State	89
Salve Regina	67
First round: Danbury, Connecticut; Second round: Middlebury, Vermont

Second round March 5
Johnson & Wales	72
Buffalo State	96
St. Mary's (Md.)	68
Randolph Macon	53
MIT	52
Rochester (NY)	60
West Conn. State	53
Middlebury	79

Sectionals; March 11
Buffalo State	74
St. Mary's (Md.)	85
Rochester (NY)	52
Middlebury	61

Sectionals; March 12
St. Mary's (Md.)	50
Middlebury	65

== Semifinals and National championship – Salem, Virginia ==
Semifinals; Friday, March 18
Wooster (30–2)	73
Williams (29–2)	71
St. Thomas (MN) (28-3)	59
Middlebury (28–1)	57

National championship Saturday, March 19
Wooster	54
St. Thomas (MN)	78
