= La Roche University =

Private university in McCandless, Pennsylvania, U.S.

- Former name: La Roche College (1963–2019)
- Motto: Ad Lucem Per Amorem (Latin)
- Motto in English: "To the light through love"
- Type: Private
- Established: 1963; 63 years ago
- Religious affiliation: Roman Catholic (Sisters of Divine Providence)
- Academic affiliations: ACCU; CIC
- President: Christina Clark
- Provost: Gregor Thuswaldner
- Faculty: 59
- Students: 2,153 (fall 2024)
- Undergraduates: 1,828 (fall 2024)
- Postgraduates: 325 (fall 2024)
- Location: McCandless Township, Pennsylvania, U.S. 40.568°N 80.014°W
- Campus: 80 acres (32 ha); Suburban
- Colors: (Red, White)
- Nickname: Redhawks
- Sporting affiliations: NCAA Division III – AMCC
- Mascot: Red Hawk
- Website: laroche.edu
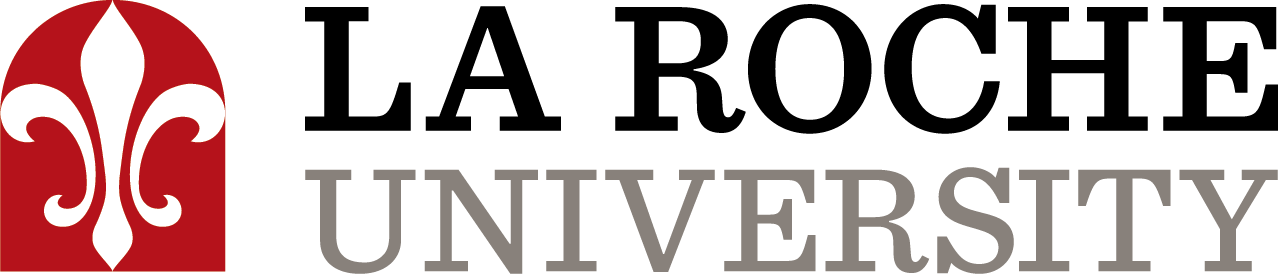

La Roche University is a private Catholic university in McCandless, Pennsylvania, United States, a North Hills suburb of Pittsburgh. Founded in 1963 by the Sisters of Divine Providence, it sits on an 80-acre (32 ha) campus within the Diocese of Pittsburgh.

== History ==
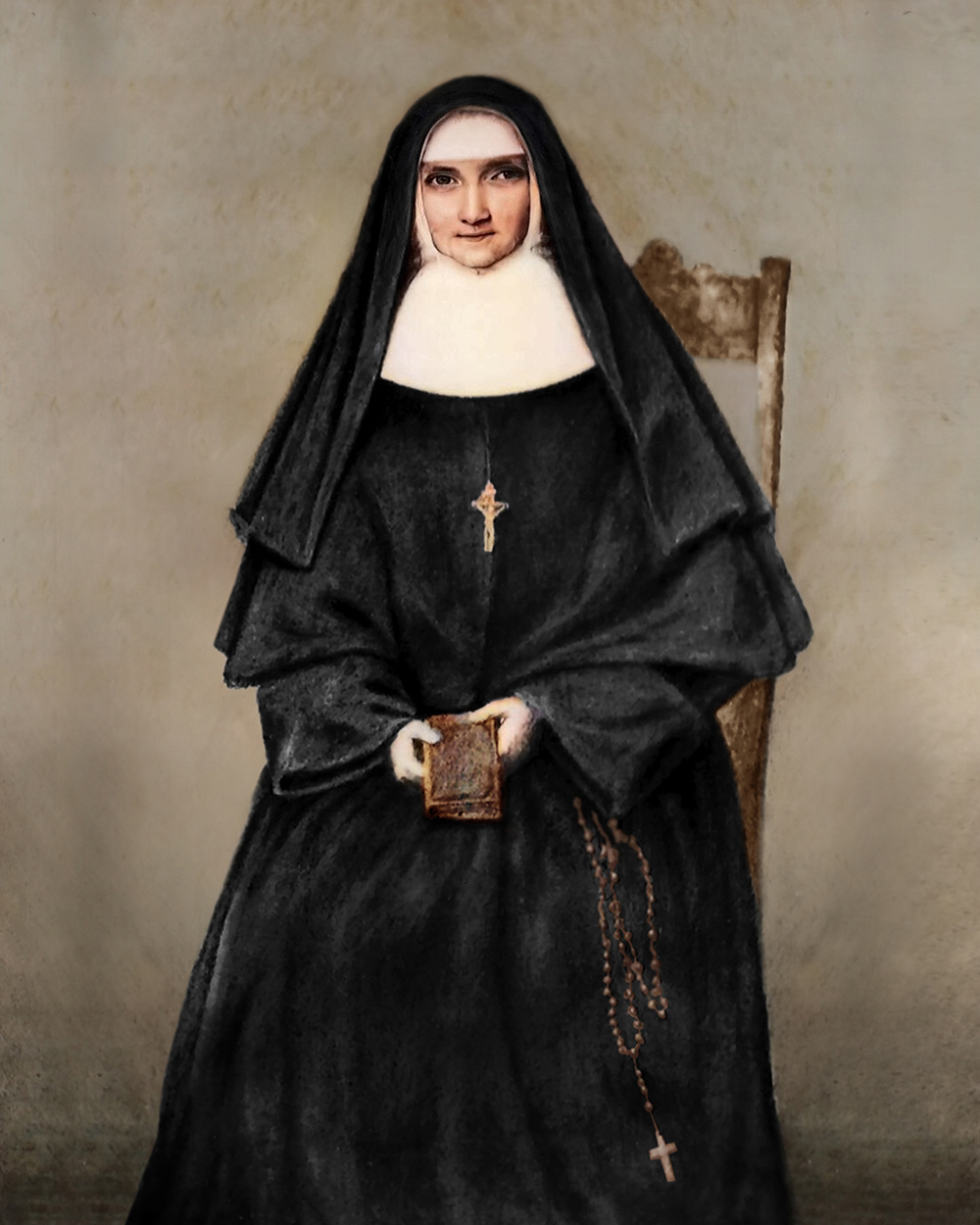
Stephanie Amelia Starkenfels de la Roche, the first mother superior of the Sisters of Divine Providence

La Roche University was founded in 1963 as "La Roche College" by the Sisters of Divine Providence as a private college for religious sisters. It was named in honor of Stephanie Amelia la Roche von Starkenfels, the first Mother Superior of the Sisters of Divine Providence. The first president of the university was Sister Annunciata Sohl, who served until 1968. The college had begun to admit its first lay students by 1965. It continued to grow, and two years later, La Roche expanded beyond its leased space to construct the first building, the John J. Wright Library.

La Roche encountered financial difficulties soon after its founding. Although closing the college was considered, de la Salle Mahler, president from 1969 to 1975, carried on. The board amended its charter in 1970 to establish La Roche as an independent, coeducational Catholic institution, while also diversifying course offerings through an affiliation with the Art Institute of Pittsburgh. This partnership made available several new areas of study, including graphic and interior design, which count among the university's strongest programs today.

An enrollment boom made the construction of two new residence halls necessary in the mid-1970s. Under college president Mary Joan Coultas (1975–80), the college launched its first capital campaign in 1979, garnering enough to construct the Palumbo Science Center, which opened in 1980. During Margaret Huber's eleven-year tenure as president beginning in 1981, the college continued to grow, marking its 25th anniversary in 1987 with the dedication of the $2.5 million-Zappala College Center. The Magdalen Chapel was added in 1990 and in 1993 the college opened the Kerr Fitness and Sports Center.

La Roche's sixth president, William A. Kerr, was appointed in 1992 and focused his leadership on raising the college's visibility, while broadening academic, cultural, and athletic programs. In 2004, the La Roche College Board of Trustees elected the college's seventh president, Candace Introcaso. In March 2019, the Pennsylvania Department of Education approved the college's request to become La Roche University, a name change that went immediately into effect. Candace died on May 22, 2023, and Senior Vice President for Academic Affairs Howard Ishiyama was appointed the interim president.

== Athletics ==
La Roche athletics wordmark

The La Roche athletics teams are called the Redhawks. The university is a member of the Division III ranks of the National Collegiate Athletic Association (NCAA), primarily competing in the Allegheny Mountain Collegiate Conference (AMCC) as a charter member since the 1997–98 academic year.

La Roche competes in 13 intercollegiate varsity sports. Men's sports include baseball, basketball, cross country, golf, lacrosse and soccer; while women's sports include basketball, cross country, lacrosse, soccer, softball, tennis and volleyball.

=== Accomplishments ===
La Roche University has won 35 AMCC conference regular season championships including baseball (9: 2007, 2012, 2014–19 and 2021), men's basketball (8: 2004, 2011, 2013, 2018–20 and 2023–24), softball (4: 2000–2002 and 2007), women's basketball (12: 2011–2017, 2019–20 and 2022–24), and women's lacrosse (1: 2025).

La Roche University has won 24 AMCC tournament championships including baseball (7: 2012 and 2014–19), men's basketball (5: 2011, 2018, 2020 and 2023–24), women's basketball (11: 2011–17, 2020, 2022–23 and 2025) women's lacrosse (1: 2025), and women's tennis (1: 2012).

The La Roche University baseball team also became the first team in AMCC conference history to win an NCAA Regional Championship after defeating Randolph Macon 4–3 in the NCAA Mideast Regional Championship on May 21, 2016. La Roche advanced to the NCAA Division III College World Series before falling to Keystone 5–4 in the National Semifinals..

== Facilities ==
The John J. Wright Library was the first building constructed for the university, built in 1967 and renovated in the early 2000s. Two residence halls were built in the mid-1970s, and the university opened the Palumbo Science Center in 1980. The 1,200-seat Kerr Fitness & Sports Center opened in 1993 and has been updated throughout the years. Current athletic facilities include a baseball field, soccer field, softball field, aerobics room, dance studio, gymnasium, indoor track and a weight room. Tennis courts of any sort, and outdoor basketball courts, have both yet to be added to the campus. Residence halls were added and expanded upon in 1997 and 2003 with the dedication of Bold Hall and Bold Hall II. A classroom building introducing electronic classroom technology was added adjacent to the Zappala College Center in 2002.

== Pacem In Terris Institute ==
Beginning in 1993, the Pacem In Terris Institute has brought students from conflict, post-conflict and developing regions of the world to study at La Roche. The program provides scholarships and assistance, to students from 21 different countries. The students are chosen by their countries on the basis of academic and personal potential, and promise to return to their homelands upon completion of their studies to work for peace and prosperity in their regions.

Notable members on the Board of the Institute are Kim Dae-jung, past president of the Republic of Korea; Queen Rania Al-Abdullah, first lady of the Hashemite Kingdom of Jordan; and Janet Museveni, first lady of the Republic of Uganda.
