= 2014 NCAA Division III men's basketball tournament =

American collegiate men's basketball tournament (2014)

- Teams: 62
- Finals site: , Salem Civic Center; Salem, Virginia
- Champions: Wisconsin–Whitewater Warhawks (4th title)
- Runner-up: Williams Ephs (4th title game)
- Semifinalists: Illinois Wesleyan Titans (6th Final Four); Amherst Lord Jeffs (6th Final Four)

The 2014 NCAA Division III men's basketball tournament was a single-elimination tournament of 62 teams held to determine the men's collegiate basketball national champion of National Collegiate Athletic Association (NCAA) Division III. It began on March 6, 2014, and concluded with the championship game on March 22, 2014, at the Salem Civic Center in Salem, Virginia.

The Wisconsin–Whitewater Warhawks defeated the Williams Ephs in the championship game, 75–73, to win their fourth national championship, their first since 2012. The two remaining semifinalists were the Illinois Wesleyan Titans and the Amherst Lord Jeffs.

== Qualifying teams ==
=== Automatic bids (42) ===
The following 42 teams were automatic qualifiers for the 2014 NCAA field by virtue of winning their conference's automatic bid (except for the UAA, whose regular-season champion received the automatic bid).

Automatic bids
Conference	Team	Record (Conf.)	Appearance	Last bid
Allegheny Mountain	Penn State Behrend	23–4 (15–3)	7th	2013
American Southwest	Texas–Dallas	25–3 (20–2)	5th	2011
Capital	Mary Washington	22–5 (12–4)	2nd	2003
Centennial	Johns Hopkins	17–10 (12–6)	9th	2007
CUNYAC	York (NY)	21–7 (13–3)	6th	2007
CCIW	Wheaton (IL)	19–8 (10–4)	10th	2013
Colonial States	Cabrini	25–1 (17–1)	12th	2013
Commonwealth Coast	Gordon	17–10 (12–6)	3rd	2010
Empire 8	Hartwick	18–9 (10–4)	7th	2012
Great Northeast	Albertus Magnus	26–2 (17–1)	4th	2013
Heartland	Rose–Hulman	22–5 (15–3)	11th	2013
Iowa	Central (IA)	20–7 (11–3)	10th	2010
Landmark	Scranton	24–3 (12–2)	25th	2012
Liberty	Hobart	21–6 (13–3)	4th	2013
Little East	Rhode Island College	20–8 (11–3)	11th	2013
MAC Commonwealth	Alvernia	20–7 (13–5)	9th	2013
MAC Freedom	DeSales	18–9 (10–4)	4th	2010
MASCAC	Bridgewater State	16–11 (8–4)	7th	2011
Michigan	Calvin	22–5 (12–2)	19th	2013
Midwest	St. Norbert	24–1 (18–0)	6th	2013
Minnesota	St. Olaf	22–5 (17–3)	1st	Never
NECC	Mitchell	19–7 (12–4)	1st	Never
NESCAC	Amherst	24–3 (9–1)	16th	2013
NEWMAC	MIT	20–8 (8–6)	6th	2013
New Jersey	Richard Stockton	23–4 (15–3)	14th	2010
North Atlantic	Husson	26–2 (17–1)	4th	2013
North Coast	Wooster	25–3 (16–2)	23rd	2013
NEAC	Morrisville State	19–8 (13–5)	3rd	2013
Northern Athletics	Marian (WI)	22–6 (17–3)	2nd	2001
Northwest	Whitworth	22–5 (14–2)	9th	2013
Ohio	Wilmington (OH)	19–8 (13–5)	2nd	2010
Old Dominion	Virginia Wesleyan	22–6 (12–4)	14th	2013
Presidents'	Saint Vincent	22–6 (12–4)	2nd	2013
Skyline	SUNY Purchase	25–2 (17–1)	4th	2013
SCIAC	Chapman	18–9 (10–6)	3rd	2011
SCAC	Trinity (TX)	19–9 (11–3)	10th	2013
SLIAC	Webster	20–7 (15–3)	4th	2011
SUNYAC	Brockport State	24–3 (16–2)	10th	2009
UAA	Washington–St. Louis	23–2 (14–0)	18th	2013
Upper Midwest	Northwestern–St. Paul	16–11 (11–3)	4th	2013
USA South	LaGrange	18–10 (9–5)	1st	Never
Wisconsin	UW–Stevens Point	26–1 (15–1)	13th	2013

=== At-large bids (20) ===
The following 20 teams were awarded qualification for the 2014 NCAA field by the NCAA Division III Men's Basketball Committee. The committee evaluated teams on the basis of their win-loss percentage, strength of schedule, head-to-head results, results against common opponents, and results against teams included in the NCAA's final regional rankings. By rule, one bid is reserved for teams in Pool B if there are enough teams that qualify for it. Pool B is for teams that are either independents or whose conference does not yet qualify for an automatic bid.

At-large bids
Conference	Team	Record (Conf.)	Appearance	Last bid	Pool
CCIW	Augustana (IL)	19–7 (9–5)	13th	2011	C
NEWMAC	Babson	20–6 (11–3)	6th	2004	C
NESCAC	Bowdoin	19–5 (6–4)	4th	2008	C
Southern	Centre	23–4 (13–1)	16th	2013	B
Centennial	Dickinson	21–6 (15–3)	6th	2013	C
Little East	Eastern Connecticut	22–6 (14–0)	5th	2012	C
UAA	Emory	17–8 (9–5)	3rd	2013	C
Michigan	Hope	20–7 (13–1)	24th	2012	C
CCIW	Illinois Wesleyan	23–4 (12–2)	23rd	2013	C
North Coast	Ohio Wesleyan	20–7 (13–5)	5th	2013	C
SUNYAC	Plattsburgh State	22–5 (15–3)	8th	2013	C
Old Dominion	Randolph–Macon	20–6 (14–2)	14th	2013	C
Minnesota	St. Thomas (MN)	22–5 (18–2)	15th	2013	C
NEWMAC	Springfield	20–7 (10–4)	7th	2013	C
SUNYAC	SUNY Geneseo	21–6 (14–4)	8th	1999	C
Wisconsin	UW–Whitewater	23–4 (13–3)	19th	2013	C
Capital	Wesley	22–3 (14–2)	4th	2013	C
NESCAC	Williams	23–4 (9–1)	14th	2013	C
North Coast	Wittenberg	21–7 (13–5)	27th	2012	C
NEWMAC	WPI	22–4 (12–2)	10th	2013	C

== Tournament bracket ==
* – Denotes overtime period

=== Top-left - Stevens Point, Wisconsin ===
First round March 6–7; Campus Sites
Danville, KY / Atlanta, GA
Centre	78
LaGrange	71
UW–Stevens Point	66
Marian (WI)	64
Stevens Point, WI
St. Olaf	72
Central (IA)	85
Texas–Dallas	85
Chapman	70
Richardson, TX
Whitworth	75
Trinity (TX)	73
UW–Whitewater	79
Northwestern–St. Paul	55
Whitewater, WI
St. Thomas (MN)	77
Augustana (IL)	88

Second round March 8 Campus Sites
Emory	72
Centre	62
UW–Stevens Point	76
Central (IA)	71
Texas–Dallas	78
Whitworth	77
UW–Whitewater	87
Augustana (IL)	68

Third round March 14; Stevens Point, WI
Emory	76
UW–Stevens Point	73
Texas–Dallas	63
UW–Whitewater	81

Regional finals March 15; Stevens Point, WI
Emory	51
UW–Whitewater	74

=== Bottom-left - Bloomington, Illinois ===
First round March 6–7; Campus Sites
Wooster	76
Saint Vincent	67
Wooster, OH
Dickinson	83
SUNY Geneseo	76
Hope	66
Penn State Behrend	70
Holland, MI
Rose–Hulman	57
Wheaton (IL)	64
Washington–St. Louis	100
Wilmington (OH)	69
St. Louis, MO
Calvin	66
Wittenberg	51
Illinois Wesleyan	71
Webster	70
Bloomington, IL
St. Norbert	87
Ohio Wesleyan	79

Second round March 8 Campus Sites
Wooster	64
Dickinson	67
Penn State Behrend	40
Wheaton (IL)	68
Washington–St. Louis	75
Calvin	83
Illinois Wesleyan	84
St. Norbert	68

Third round March 14; Bloomington, IL
Dickinson	81
Wheaton (IL)	71
Calvin	64
Illinois Wesleyan	78

Regional finals March 15; Bloomington, IL
Dickinson	66
Illinois Wesleyan	79

=== Top-right - Amherst, Massachusetts ===
First round March 6–7; Campus Sites
Providence, RI / Amherst, MA
York (NY)	79
Rhode Island College	54
Plattsburgh State	76
MIT	53
Plattsburgh, NY
Husson	75
Eastern Connecticut	81
Cabrini	100
Bridgewater State	69
Radnor, PA
Richard Stockton	72
Bowdoin	66
Brockport State	80
Morrisville State	83
Brockport, NY
Scranton	81
Hobart	94

Second round March 8 Campus Sites
Amherst	87
York (NY)	51
Plattsburgh State	70
Eastern Connecticut	60
Cabrini	76
Richard Stockton	85
Morrisville State	86
Hobart	75

Third round March 14; Amherst, MA
Amherst	87
Plattsburgh State	63
Richard Stockton	81
Morrisville State	88

Regional finals March 15; Amherst, MA
Amherst	84
Morrisville State	74

=== Bottom-right - Fredericksburg, Virginia ===
First round March 6–7; Campus Sites
SUNY Purchase	97
Hartwick	71
Purchase, NY
Albertus Magnus	68
WPI	66
Williams	81
Mitchell	66
Williamstown, MA
Babson	68
Gordon	76
Randolph–Macon	70
DeSales	76
Ashland, VA
Mary Washington	78
Springfield	58
Virginia Wesleyan	84
Johns Hopkins	72
Virginia Beach, VA
Alvernia	78
Wesley	83

Second round March 8 Campus Sites
SUNY Purchase	79
Albertus Magnus	87
Williams	81
Gordon	63
DeSales	49
Mary Washington	77
Virginia Wesleyan	79
Wesley	74

Third round March 14; Fredericksburg, VA
Albertus Magnus	92
Williams	110
Mary Washington	74
Virginia Wesleyan	70

Regional finals March 15; Fredericksburg, VA
Williams	79
Mary Washington	46

=== Final Four - Salem, Virginia ===
Semifinals; Friday, March 21
UW–Whitewater	71
Illinois Wesleyan	63
Amherst	69
Williams	98

National championship Saturday, March 22
UW–Whitewater	75
Williams	73

== See also ==
- 2014 NCAA Division I men's basketball tournament
- 2014 NCAA Division II men's basketball tournament
