= Salem Civic Center =

Sports venue in Salem, Virginia

- Interactive map of Salem Civic Center
- Location: 1001 Roanoke Boulevard; Salem, Virginia, United States
- Coordinates: 37°17′07″N 80°2′23″W
- Owner: City of Salem
- Capacity: 6,820

Construction
- Opened: 1967

Tenants
- ODAC Men's Basketball Tournament (1977-Present); NCAA Division III Men's Final Four (1996-2012, 2014-2018); Roanoke Valley Rebels (EHL) (1967–1976); Salem Raiders (ACHL) (1980-1983); Roanoke Maroons (NCAA) (1967-1982)

The Salem Civic Center is a 6,820-seat multi-purpose arena in Salem, Virginia. It was built in 1967 and is part of the James E. Taliaferro Sports and Entertainment Complex (named after a former mayor of Salem), which also includes Salem Stadium and the Salem Memorial Baseball Stadium. The Salem Civic Center was originally known as the Salem-Roanoke Valley Civic Center, but the county withdrew its financial backing in the 1980s.

The civic center was home to the Salem Rebels and Salem Raiders ice hockey teams in the 1960s and 1970s. The NCAA Division III men's college basketball championship was held at the civic center for many years. Boxing, professional wrestling, rodeos, and high school basketball games are typical events.

In addition to sporting events, the Salem Civic Center also hosts concerts, circuses, conventions and trade shows. The annual Roanoke Valley Horse Show and Salem Fair are held at the civic center and the adjacent grounds. It is also currently the largest convention facility in the Roanoke Valley; there is a total of 40,000 square feet (4,000 m^{2}) of space in the main arena, the community room (which can be divided into three smaller rooms) and three other rooms.

== Use in Borat ==
The center was infamously used for a scene in the 2006 mockumentary movie Borat, which includes the titular character singing a made-up (and humorously insulting) version of the Kazakhstan national anthem to the tune of "The Star-Spangled Banner" to a jeering Virginian crowd who were not aware of the mockumentary being made.
