= 2013 NCAA Division III men's basketball tournament =

American collegiate men's basketball tournament (2013)

- Teams: 62
- Finals site: Two sites, Salem, Virginia & Atlanta, Georgia
- Champions: Amherst Lord Jeffs (2nd title)
- Runner-up: Mary Hardin–Baylor Crusaders (1st title game)
- Semifinalists: St. Thomas Tommies (2nd Final Four); North Central (IL) Cardinals (1st Final Four)
- Winning coach: David Hixon (2nd title)
- MOP: Allen Williamson (Amherst)

The 2013 NCAA Division III men's basketball tournament was a single-elimination tournament of 62 teams held to determine the men's collegiate basketball national champion of National Collegiate Athletic Association (NCAA) Division III. It began on March 2, 2013, and concluded with the championship game on April 7, 2013, at Philips Arena in Atlanta as part of the festivities for the 75th anniversary of the NCAA Tournament. The Amherst Lord Jeffs defeated the Mary Hardin–Baylor Crusaders 87–70 in the championship game. The quarterfinal and semifinal rounds were held in Salem Civic Center in Salem, Virginia, the traditional Final Four host.

== Qualified teams ==
=== Automatic qualifiers ===
The following teams were automatic qualifiers for the 2013 NCAA field by virtue of winning their conference's tournament (except for the UAA, whose regular-season champion received the automatic bid).

Conference	Team	Appearance	Last bid
Allegheny Mountain	Penn State Behrend	6th	2011
American Southwest	Concordia (TX)	1st	Never
Capital	St. Mary's (MD)	5th	2012
Centennial	Dickinson	3rd	1997
CUNYAC	Staten Island	11th	2012
CCIW	North Central (IL)	7th	2012
Colonial States	Cabrini	11th	2012
Commonwealth Coast	Curry	2nd	2008
Empire 8	Ithaca	10th	2012
Great Northeast	Albertus Magnus	3rd	2012
Heartland	Rose-Hulman	10th	2012
Iowa	Dubuque	5th	1990
Landmark	Catholic	12th	2007
Liberty	Hobart	3rd	2012
Little East	Rhode Island College	10th	2012
MASCAC	Fitchburg State	1st	Never
Michigan	Calvin	18th	2007
MAC Commonwealth	Alvernia	8th	2011
MAC Freedom	Delaware Valley	2nd	2011
Midwest	St. Norbert	5th	2011
Minnesota	St. Thomas	14th	2012
NEWMAC	WPI	9th	2011
New England	Elms	8th	2011
NESCAC	Amherst	15th	2012
New Jersey	Ramapo	6th	2011
North Atlantic	Husson	3rd	2011
North Coast	Ohio Wesleyan	4th	2012
North Eastern	Morrisville State	2nd	2012
Northern	Aurora	9th	2010
Northwest	Whitworth	8th	2012
Ohio	Marietta	3rd	2011
Old Dominion	Randolph–Macon	13th	2012
Presidents'	St. Vincent	1st	Never
Skyline	SUNY-Purchase	3rd	2011
SCIAC	Redlands	3rd	2011
SCAC	Trinity (TX)	9th	2012
SLIAC	Spalding	1st	Never
SUNYAC	Cortland State	5th	2006
UAA	Washington U.	17th	2012
Upper Midwest	Northwestern (MN)	3rd	2012
USA South	Christopher Newport	19th	2012
Wisconsin	UW–Whitewater	18th	2012

=== At-large qualifiers ===
The NCAA Selection Committee, by rule, must select one team from the conferences without automatic berths and non-affiliated schools (Pool B). The Selection Committee makes the remaining 19 selections at-large from all conferences (Pool C).

Conference	Team	Appearance	Last bid	Pool
Southern	Centre	15th	2011	B
UAA	Emory	2nd	1990	C
Old Dominion	Hampden–Sydney	14th	2007	C
CCIW	Illinois Wesleyan	22nd	2012	C
American Southwest	Mary Hardin–Baylor	6th	2012	C
NESCAC	Middlebury	6th	2012	C
NEWMAC	MIT	5th	2012	C
SUNYAC	Plattsburgh State	7th	2010	C
Old Dominion	Randolph	1st	Never	C
UAA	Rochester	14th	2011	C
New Jersey	Rutgers–Newark	2nd	2010	C
NEWMAC	Springfield	6th	2005	C
Empire 8	Stevens	2nd	2007	C
Heartland	Transylvania	9th	2012	C
Wisconsin	UW–Stevens Point	12th	2012	C
Old Dominion	Virginia Wesleyan	13th	2012	C
Capital	Wesley	3rd	2010	C
CCIW	Wheaton (IL)	9th	2012	C
NESCAC	Williams	13th	2011	C
North Coast	Wooster	22nd	2012	C

== Bracket ==
2013 Third Round Hosts

* – Denotes overtime period

Unless otherwise noted, all times listed are Eastern Daylight Time (UTC-04)

=== St. Paul, MN Sectional ===
First round March 2
at	Rose-Hulman	52
Calvin	72
at	UW–Stevens Point	71
Northwestern (MN)	54
at	St. Thomas	91
Aurora	62
at	Wheaton (IL)	59
St. Norbert	58

Second round March 9
Calvin	67
at	UW–Stevens Point	58
at	St. Thomas	68
Wheaton (IL)	58

Third round March 16
Calvin	62
at	St. Thomas	63

=== Williamstown, MA Sectional ===
First round March 2
at	Virginia Wesleyan	76
Delaware Valley	61
at	Christopher Newport	84
Rutgers–Newark	72
at	Williams	79
Wesley	78
at	Catholic	67
Staten Island	61

Second round March 9
at	Virginia Wesleyan	80
Christopher Newport	69
at	Williams	89
Catholic	78

Third round March 16
Virginia Wesleyan	75
at	Williams	84

=== Spokane, WA Sectional ===
First round March 2
at	Trinity (TX)	83
Concordia (TX)	87
at	Whitworth	75
Redlands	69
at	Emory	77
Randolph	56

Second round March 9
at	Mary Hardin–Baylor	117
Concordia (TX)	92
at	Whitworth	80
Emory	77

Third round March 16
Mary Hardin–Baylor	69
at	Whitworth	63

=== St. Mary's City, MD Sectional ===
First round March 2
at	St. Mary's (MD)	85
MIT	76
at	Alvernia	97
Albertus Magnus	78
Ramapo	78
Morrisville State	86
at	Rhode Island College	62*
Hobart	59

Second round March 9
St. Mary's (MD)	72
at	Alvernia	78
Morrisville State	66*
at	Rhode Island College	59

Third round March 16
at	St. Mary's (MD)	84
Morrisville State	66

Due to an NCAA ban on postseason games in New Jersey, the first round match between top-seeded Ramapo and Morrisville State was held in Nyack, NY on the campus of Nyack College.

=== Amherst, MA Sectional ===
First round March 2
at	Plattsburgh State	84
Husson	63
Stevens	60
Randolph–Macon	69
at	WPI	80
SUNY-Purchase	67

Second round March 9
at	Amherst	89
Plattsburgh State	72
Randolph–Macon	79
WPI	68

Third round March 16
at	Amherst	93
Randolph–Macon	76

Due to an NCAA ban on postseason games in New Jersey, Stevens was unable to host its first round match between against Randolph-Macon. The match was moved to Bronx, NY on the campus of Lehman College.

Due to a scheduling conflicting, WPI could not host its second round match against Randolph–Macon. The match was moved to Assumption College, also located in Worcester, MA.

=== Wooster, OH Sectional ===
First round March 2
at	Wooster	62
Penn State-Behrend	44
at	Dickinson	80
Marietta	65
at	Hampden–Sydney	78
Cabrini	80
at	Ohio Wesleyan	84
St. Vincent	75

Second round March 9
at	Wooster	80
Dickinson	54
Cabrini	84
at	Ohio Wesleyan	81

Third round March 16
at	Wooster	63
Cabrini	70

=== Naperville, IL Sectional ===
First round March 2
at	Washington U.	70
Spalding	61
at	Illinois Wesleyan	80
Transylvania	71
at	UW–Whitewater	58
Dubuque	42
at	North Central (IL)	66
Centre	50

Second round March 9
at	Washington U.	67
Illinois Wesleyan	71
UW–Whitewater	60
North Central (IL)	64

Third round March 16
Illinois Wesleyan	73
at	North Central (IL)	83

=== Middlebury, VT Sectional ===
First round March 2
at	Springfield	77
Ithaca	89
at	Rochester	91
Fitchburg State	86
at	Middlebury	68
Curry	66
at	Cortland State	85
Elms	59

Second round March 9
Ithaca	70
at	Rochester	68
Middlebury	67
at	Cortland State	63

Third round March 16
Ithaca	72
at	Middlebury	73

=== Elite Eight - Salem, Virginia and Atlanta, Georgia ===
Quarterfinals; March 22
St. Thomas	82
Williams	79
Mary Hardin–Baylor	69
St. Mary's (MD)	66
Amherst	101
Cabrini	82
North Central (IL)	77
Middlebury	65

Semifinals; March 23
St. Thomas	67
Mary Hardin–Baylor	74
Amherst	52
North Central (IL)	44

National Championship Game; April 7
Mary Hardin–Baylor	70
Amherst	87

== Record by conference ==
Conference	# of Bids	Record	Win %	R62	R32	S16	E8	F4	CG	NC
NESCAC	3	11-2	.846	2	3	3	3	1	1	1
American Southwest	2	5–2	.714	1	2	1	1	1	1	–
CCIW	3	7–3	.700	3	3	2	1	1	–	–
Minnesota	1	4–1	.800	1	1	1	1	1	–	–
Capital	2	3–2	.600	2	1	1	1	–	–	–
CSAC	1	3–1	.750	1	1	1	1	–	–	–
ODAC	4	4–4	.500	4	2	2	–	–	–	–
North Coast	2	3–2	.600	2	2	1	–	–	–	–
Empire 8	2	2–2	.500	2	1	1	–	–	–	–
Michigan	1	2–1	.667	1	1	1	–	–	–	–
North Eastern	1	2–1	.667	1	1	1	–	–	–	–
Northwest	1	2–1	.667	1	1	1	–	–	–	–
UAA	3	3-3	.500	3	3	–	–	–	–	–
SUNYAC	2	2–2	.500	2	2	–	–	–	–	–
Wisconsin	2	2-2	.500	2	2	–	–	–	–	–
NEWMAC	3	1–3	.250	3	1	–	–	–	–	–
Centennial	1	1–1	.500	1	1	–	–	–	–	–
Landmark	1	1–1	.500	1	1	–	–	–	–	–
Little East	1	1–1	.500	1	1	–	–	–	–	–
MAC Commonwealth	1	1–1	.500	1	1	–	–	–	–	–
USA South	1	1–1	.500	1	1	–	–	–	–	–

- The R62, R32, S16, E8, F4, CG, NC columns indicate how many teams from each conference were in the round of 62 (first round), round of 32 (second round), Sweet 16, Elite Eight, Final Four, championship game, and national champion, respectively.
- The ASC and NESCAC each had one representative which earned a bye to the second round.
- The AMCC, CCC, CUNYAC, GNAC, IIAC, Liberty League, MAC Freedom, MASCAC, MWC, North Atlantic, NACC, NECC, OAC, Presidents', SAA, SCIAC, Skyline, SLIAC, and UMAC each had one representative, eliminated in the first round with a record of 0–1.
- The Heartland and NJAC had two representatives, eliminated in the first round, with a record of 0–2.

== See also ==
- 2013 NCAA Division I men's basketball tournament
- 2013 NCAA Division II men's basketball tournament
- 2013 NAIA Division I men's basketball tournament
- 2013 NAIA Division II men's basketball tournament
- 2013 NCAA Division III women's basketball tournament
