= 1990 Williams Ephs football team =

American college football season

1990 Williams Ephs football

Little Three champion
- Conference: Little Three Conference
- Record: 8–0 (2–0 Little Three)
- Head coach: Dick Farley (4th season)
- Offensive coordinator: Dave Caputi (5th season)
- Home stadium: Weston Field

The 1990 Williams Ephs football team was an American football team that represented Williams College as a member of the Little Three Conference during the 1990 NCAA Division III football season. In their fourth year under head coach Dick Farley, the Ephs compiled a perfect 8–0 record, won the Little Three championship, and outscored opponents by a total of 233 to 73.

The team's statistical leaders included Dan Dwyer with 713 passing yards and Sean Rorke with 550 rushing yards.

The 1990 season was part of a 23-game winning streak that began on October 15, 1988, and ended on October 6, 1991. Prior to October 6, 1991, it was the longest current winning streak in intercollegiate football.

In more than 100 years of Williams College football prior to 1989, the program had never had a perfect season. That changed with the first perfect season in 1989 and continued with the second perfect season in 1990. Six additional perfect seasons followed in 1994, 1998, 2001, 2006, 2010, and 2021.

The team played its home games at Weston Field in Williamstown, Massachusetts.

== Schedule ==
Date	Opponent	Site	Result	Attendance	Source
September 22	Hamilton	Weston Field; Williamstown, MA	W 26–16	3,565	
September 29	at Tufts	Medford, MA	W 27–3	4,256	
October 6	at Trinity (CT)	Hartford, CT	W 24–21	4,852	
October 13	Bates	Weston Field; Williamstown, MA	W 35–0	3,209	
October 20	at Colby	Waterville, ME	W 28–6	3,000	
October 27	Middlebury	Weston Field; Williamstown, MA	W 17–6	5,150	
November 3	Wesleyan	Weston Field; Williamstown, MA	W 30–3	11,117	
November 10	at Amherst	Pratt Field; Amherst, MA (The Biggest Little Game in America)	W 46–18	5,148–8,500	
