= 1989 Williams Ephs football team =

American college football season

1989 Williams Ephs football

Little Three champion
- Conference: New England Small College Athletic Conference; Little Three Conference
- Record: 8–0 (2–0 NESCAC; Little Three)
- Head coach: Dick Farley (3rd season)
- Offensive coordinator: Dave Caputi (4th season)
- Home stadium: Weston Field

The 1989 Williams Ephs football team was an American football team that represented Williams College as a member of both the New England Small College Athletic Conference (NESCAC) and the Little Three Conference during the 1989 NCAA Division III football season. In their third year under head coach Dick Farley, the Ephs compiled a perfect 8–0 record, won the Little Three championship, and outscored opponents by a total of 202 to 73.

Williams tailback Neal Chesley ranked second in the NESCAC with 724 rushing yards. Williams junior defensive end Ted Rogers recorded 38 unassisted tackles, 12 sacks, ran back two blocked punts for touchdowns, and was named the NESCAC Defensive Player of the Year. Five Ephs, including Chesley and Rogers, received first-team honors on the 1989 NESCAC all-star team.

The 1989 season was the first perfect season in the 109-year history of Williams College football. After completing no perfect seasons in the first 108 years of the program, the Ephs had eight perfect seasons from 1989 to 2021, including 1990, 1994, 1998, 2001, 2006, 2010, and 2021.

The 1989 season was also part of a 23-game winning streak that began on October 15, 1988, and ended on October 6, 1991 Prior to October 6, 1991, it was the longest current winning streak in intercollegiate football.

The team played its home games at Weston Field in Williamstown, Massachusetts.

== Schedule ==
Date	Opponent	Site	Result	Attendance	Source
September 23	at Hamilton	Clinton, NY	W 16–9	400	
September 30	Tufts	Weston Field; Williamstown, MA	W 24–9	3,681	
October 7	Trinity (CT)	Weston Field; Williamstown, MA	W 26–21	4,138	
October 14	at Bates	Lewiston, ME	W 34–16	2,000	
October 21	Colby	Weston Field; Williamstown, MA	W 35–7	2,179	
October 28	at Middlebury	Middlebury, VT	W 22–0	2,000	
November 4	at Wesleyan	Middletown, CT	W 28–0	5,800	
November 11	Amherst	Weston Field; Williamstown, MA (The Biggest Little Game in America)	W 17–14	13,671	
