= 1994 Williams Ephs football team =

American college football season

1994 Williams Ephs football

Little Three champion
- Conference: Little Three Conference
- Record: 8–0 (2–0 Little Three)
- Head coach: Dick Farley (8th season)
- Offensive coordinator: Dave Caputi (9th season)
- Home stadium: Weston Field

The 1994 Williams Ephs football team was an American football team that represented Williams College as a member of the Little Three Conference during the 1990 NCAA Division III football season. In their eighth year under head coach Dick Farley, the Ephs compiled a perfect 8–0 record, won the Little Three championship, and outscored opponents by a total of 331 to 67. The team's average of 41.4 points game was the highest in Williams College history.

In more than 100 years of Williams College football prior to 1989, the program had never had a perfect season. That changed with the first perfect season in 1989 and continued with the second perfect season in 1990 and the third perfect season in 1994. Five additional perfect seasons followed in 1998, 2001, 2006, 2010, and 2021.

The team played its home games at Weston Field in Williamstown, Massachusetts.

== Schedule ==
Date	Opponent	Site	Result	Attendance	Source
September 24	Bowdoin	Weston Field; Williamstown, MA	W 42–6		
October 1	Trinity (CT)	Weston Field; Williamstown, MA	W 22–18		
October 8	at Bates	Lewiston, ME	W 49–0		
October 15	Middlebury	Weston Field; Williamstown, MA	W 40–0		
October 22	at Tufts	Medford, MA	W 35–7		
October 29	at Hamilton	Clinton, NY	W 50–7		
November 5	Wesleyan	Weston Field; Williamstown, MA	W 45–14		
November 12	at Amherst	Amherst, MA (The Biggest Little Game in America)	W 48–14		
