= Christopher Newport Captains =

- University: Christopher Newport University
- Nickname: Captains
- NCAA: Division III
- Conference: Coast to Coast Athletic Conference (primary); New Jersey Athletic Conference (football); Coastal Lacrosse Conference (men's lacrosse); MAISA (sailing)
- Athletic director: Kyle McMullin
- Location: Newport News, Virginia
- Varsity teams: 19
- Football stadium: TowneBank Stadium
- Basketball arena: Freeman Center
- Baseball stadium: Captains Park
- Colors: Royal blue and silver
- Mascot: Captain Chris
- Website: www.cnusports.com
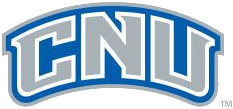

Team NCAA championships
- 15

The Christopher Newport Captains (also CNU Captains) are the athletic teams that represent Christopher Newport University, located in Newport News, Virginia, in NCAA Division III intercollegiate sports. The Captains compete as members of the Coast to Coast Athletic Conference (C2C) for the majority of varsity sports except for football, which plays in the New Jersey Athletic Conference, men's lacrosse, which plays in the Coastal Lacrosse Conference, and field hockey, which is independent. The football team remains a NJAC associate member because C2C does not sponsor football.

== Varsity teams ==
Men's sports	Women's sports
Baseball	Basketball
Basketball	Cross country
Cross country	Field hockey
Football	Golf
Golf	Lacrosse
Lacrosse	Sailing
Sailing	Soccer
Soccer	Softball
Tennis	Tennis
Track and field	Track and field
	Volleyball

=== Baseball ===
The Captains baseball team has made 10 appearances in the NCAA Division III baseball tournament, notably finishing in 3rd and 2nd place in 2002 and 2003, respectively, under the coaching of John Harvell. The CNU baseball team has fielded 10 All American Athletes.

=== Basketball ===
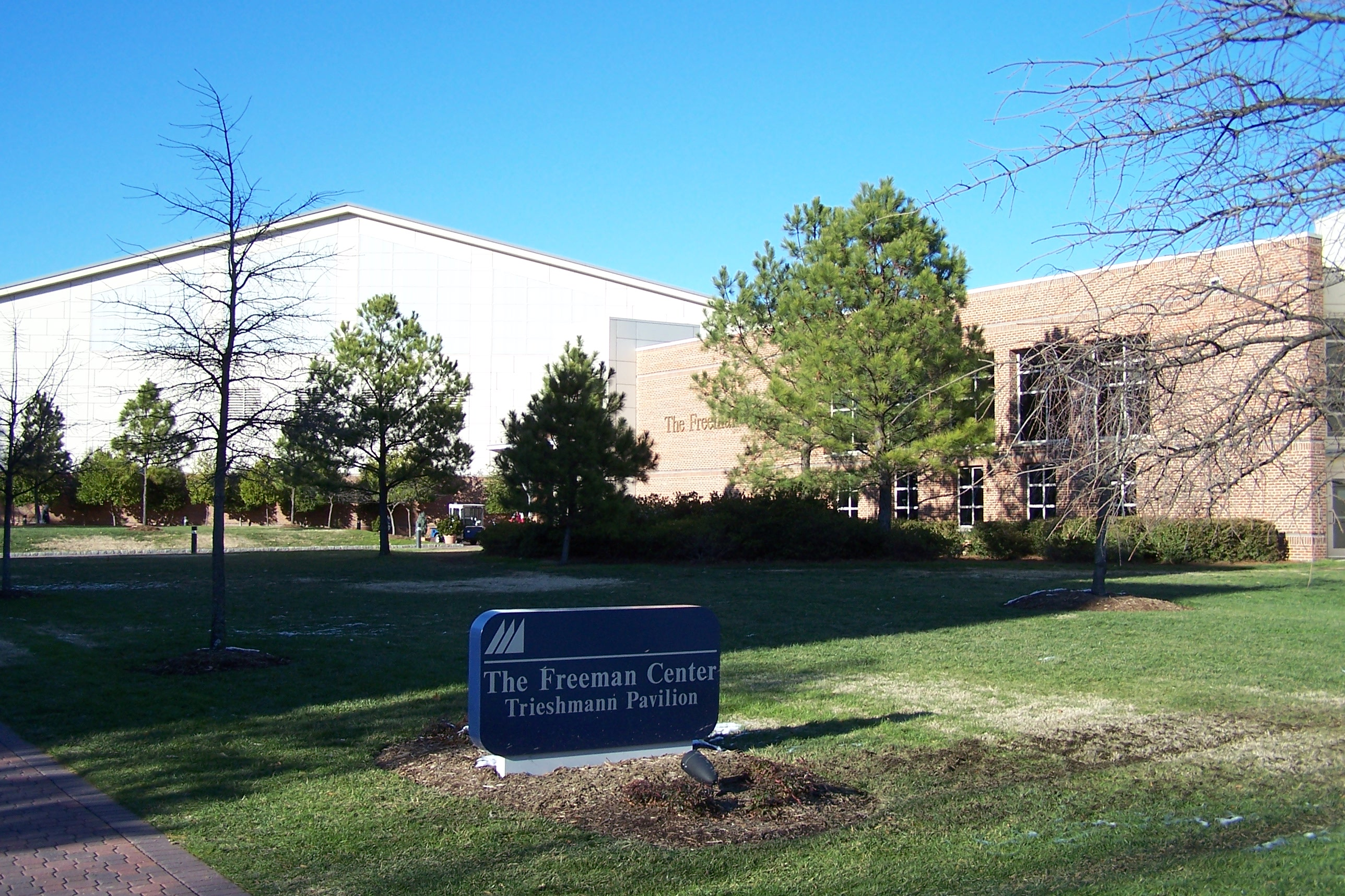
The Freeman Center & Trieshmann Pavilion

The CNU Men's basketball team holds an impressive .683 percent victory percentage (as of the end of the 2021-22 season) and 16 All-American Athlete honors over its almost 60 years of existence. The men's team has reached the final four of the D-III tournament twice, in 2016 and 2019. CNU has also produced NBA player Lamont Strothers. The Captains are currently under the direction of head coach John Krikorian.

In 2023, the Captains won their first Men's D-III National Championship over Mount Union with a last second, buzzer-beater layup by junior Trey Barber, 74–72.

The Women's basketball team, started in 1971, sports an overall win percentage at .669 (as of the end of the 2021-22 season) and has fielded 7 All-American Athlete honors. The women's team has reached the final four of the D-III tournament twice, in 2011 and 2017, and were the national runners-up in the 2023 tournament.

=== Cross country ===
The CNU Men's Cross Country team has had over 110 first team All-Dixie/USA South Conference awards and 65 All Mason-Dixon Conference awards. The CNU Women's Cross Country team holds over 50 First team All-Dixie/USA South Conference awards and 42 All Mason-Dixon Conference awards. The men's team has also produced 4 All-American athletes with 1 award each.

=== Field hockey ===
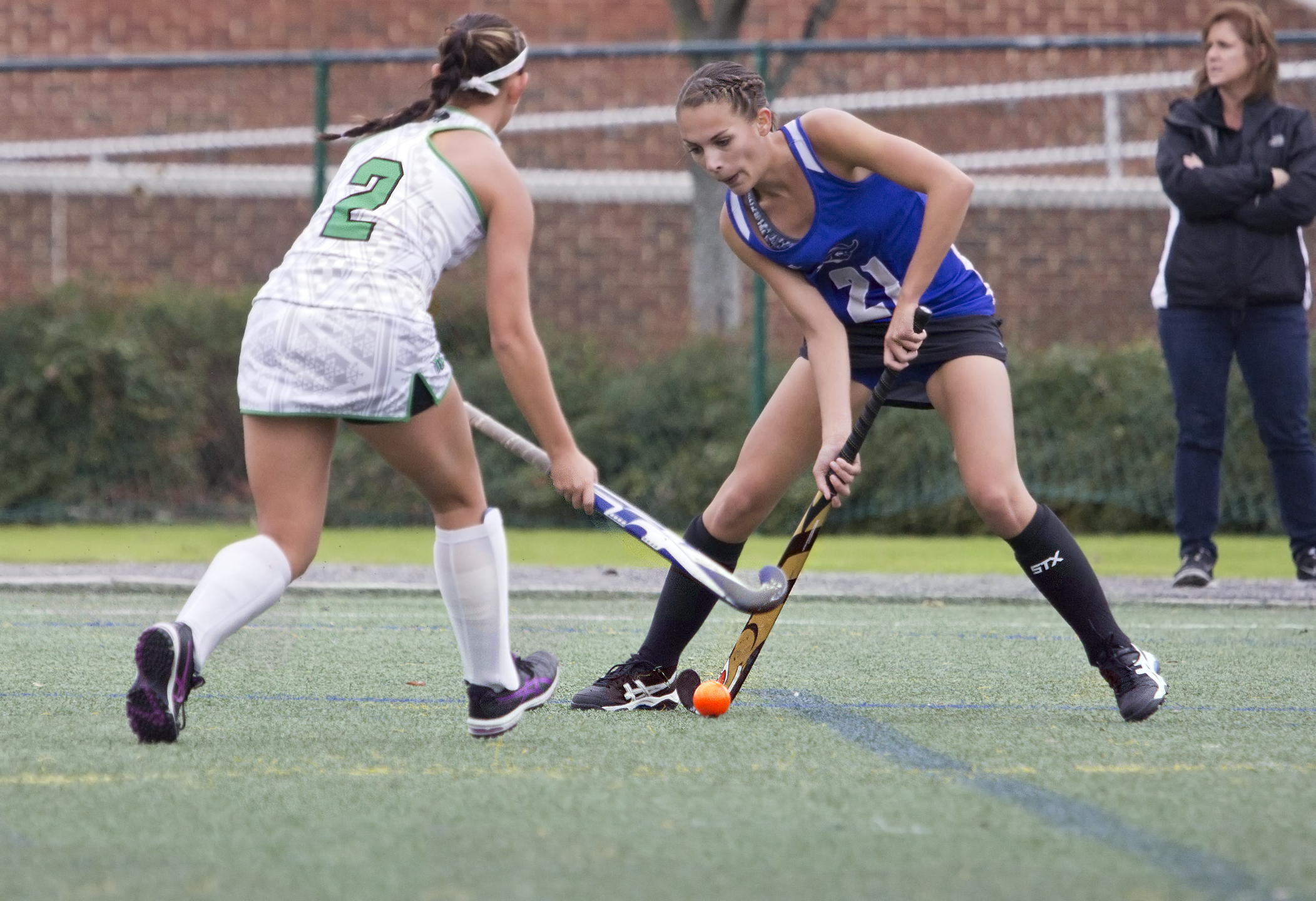
Field hockey team in action

The women's Field Hockey Team has been coached by Carrie Moura since 2003. In 2013 and 2025, the team reached the Final Four in the NCAA Division III National Tournament, the Elite Eight in 2006 and 2024, and the Sweet Sixteen a total of seven times.

The team has had five All-Americans and numerous all region players.

=== Football ===
With most CNU sports having been established for 20 years or more, CNU Football is one of the newer sports teams at Christopher Newport. Started in 2001 under head coach Matt Kelchner, the team made it to the NCAA play-offs 10 times between 2001 and 2014. The Captains were the first team in NCAA history to win a conference title and advance to the NCAA playoffs in their first year of play - and finished the regular season no lower than second place during their entire tenure competing in the USA South Athletic Conference. The Captains football team began competing in the New Jersey Athletic Conference in 2015. The Captains suffered a postseason drought upon joining the NJAC, not making the NCAA playoffs until the 2023 season, their first playoff appearance in nine years. Their current head coach is Paul Crowley.

=== Lacrosse ===
CNU men's lacrosse inaugural season was 2007 and was competitive from the start. In 2013, the Captains reached the NCAA Division III tournament for the first time. CNU reached the NCAA D-III 3rd round in 2018, and most notably, the final four in 2021. In 2022, the team became a charter member of the new Coastal Lacrosse Conference.

The CNU women's lacrosse team was founded in 2001, and has made the D-III tournament a total of eight times as of 2022, advancing as far as the Sweet Sixteen in 2013.

=== Soccer ===
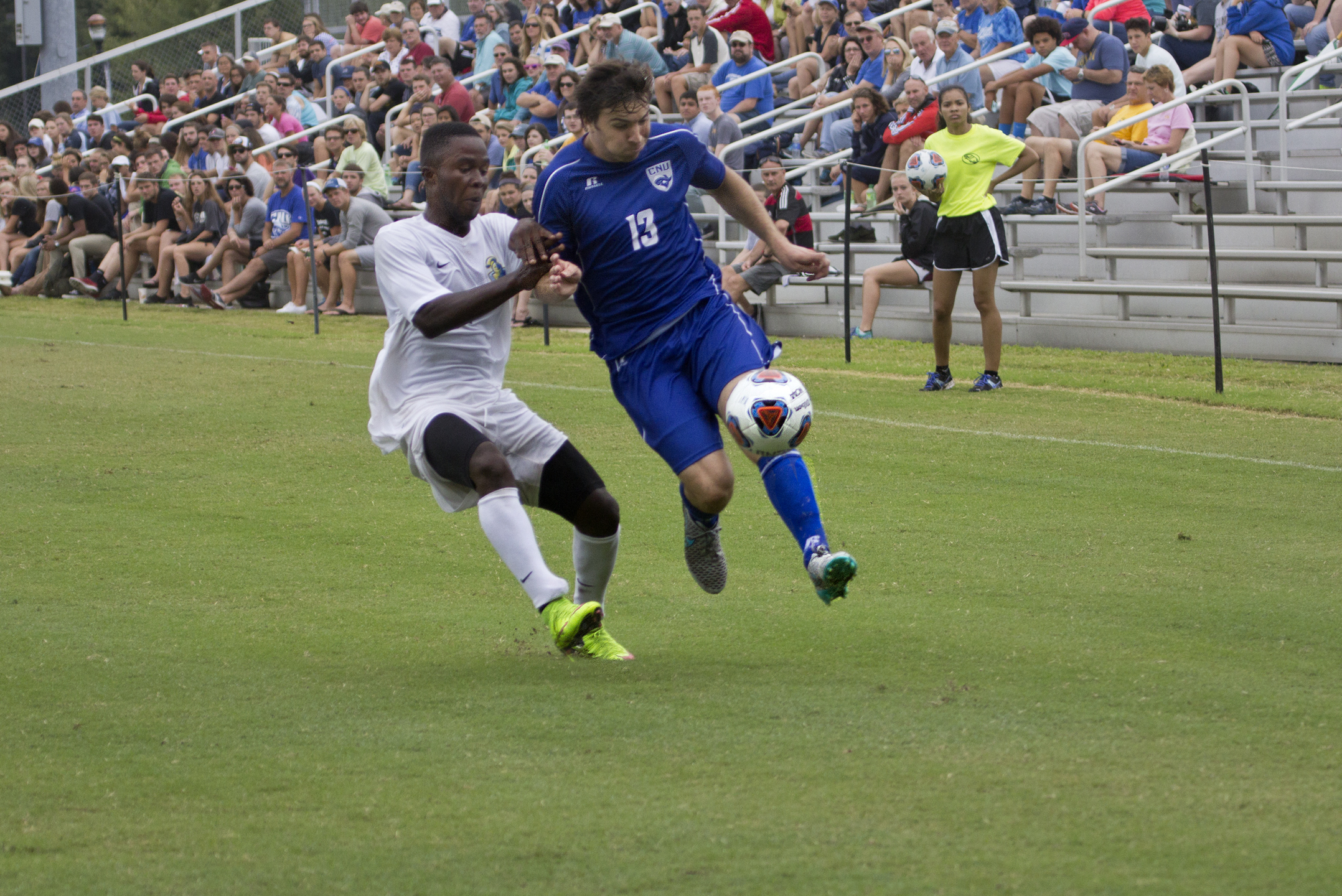
CNU (in blue) v Neumann University in 2017

Seth Roland was head coach of the soccer team from 1982 to 1987. The men's team has made 13 appearances in the NCAA Division III Men's Soccer Championship, reaching as high as the Elite Eight in 2000, 2008, 2009, and 2014.

The women's team has an impressive win percentage of .849 since their inception in 1997 (as of the end of the 2021-22 season). Most notably, they earned Christopher Newport's first National Championship title in the 2021 tournament.

=== Softball ===
The university’s softball team placed 2nd in the NCAA Division III Softball Championship in 2011, and won Christopher Newport's second NCAA National Championship Title in 2022.

=== Tennis ===
The CNU men's tennis team has recently come onto the Division III tennis scene after years in the shadows. The men won the USA South Conference title for the regular season and the Conference Tournament for the first time in almost a decade in 2017. The team players had several wins over Division I opponents and sophomore Eddie Glidewell finished in the Top 35 in the Nation. He joined five other players to reach this distinction - Holden Knight, Detlef Schultz, Jason Martin, and Hugh Spain.

=== Track and field ===
The CNU track has an impressive historical roster with 62 national championship titles held by 31 different athletes. Also, the track team has received a total of 511 All-American Athlete awards among 119 different athletes.

=== Volleyball ===
The CNU women's volleyball team was established in 1977, and has enjoyed considerable success in recent years under head coach Lindsay Birch. The Captains have appeared in every NCAA D-III tournament since 2006 (with the exception of 2020, which was cancelled due to COVID-19). Their most successful season was 2011, where they were national runners-up.

== Club sports ==
CNU sports club programs include ice hockey, equestrian, dressage, cycling, fishing, lacrosse, martial arts, rock climbing, rugby, scuba diving, silver storm dance, soccer, swimming, table tennis, tennis, ultimate frisbee and volleyball.

=== CNU F.C. ===
CNU FC officially became a school-recognized club in 2005. It was started by Phill Condrey (President), Steven Mohn (Vice-President), Jason Semko (Secretary), Scott Siclari (Treasurer), and Jeremy Wells. CNU FC

=== CNU Ice hockey ===
The CNU ice hockey team is a club sport at CNU and is a member of the ACHA and BRHC. The CNU Ice Hockey club was formed in the fall of 2004. The team just completed its ninth season of play, finishing with the team's first Conference Championship, defeating Loyola University in overtime. See the CNU Men's Ice Hockey website at: .

=== CNU Rugby ===
The CNU Rugby team was founded as a club sport in the Fall of 2000. They are a member of the Virginia Rugby Union, Division III. And are 2009 DIII State Champs as well as 2012 V.R.U. Champions.

=== CNU Martial Arts Club ===
The CNU MAC was established by Skyler Brady in 2009. CNU MAC is a competitive mixed martial arts team that trains in Brazilian jiu-jitsu, wrestling, kickboxing and Muay Thai. The team hosted its first tournament, The Captain's Invitational on October 31, 2010. CNUMAC

=== CNU Men's Club Volleyball ===
CNU Men's Volleyball club holds practices 3 days a week, and attends at least 3 tournaments a semester. Current president is Andrew Thompson (senior).

=== CNU Swimming Club ===
The CNU Swimming Club is not a widely recognized club at CNU as there is no pool on campus. When asked about the club many would reply, "We have a swim team?" The club competes with other swim clubs around Virginia and even out of state colleges. Recently, the CNU team won its first meet which was against Loyola University, Ohio University, and Mary Washington University. The club looks to expand in the coming years, which will hopefully bring a pool to CNU's campus.

== National championships ==
=== Team ===
Sport	Association	Division	Year	Opponent/Runner-up	Score
Men's basketball (1)	NCAA	Division III	2023	Mount Union	74–72
Women's soccer (1)	NCAA	Division III	2021	TCNJ	2–0
Softball (1)	NCAA	Division III	2022	Trine	3–0
Women's indoor track and field (6)	NCAA	Division III	1988	UMass Boston	66–39
Women's indoor track and field (6)	NCAA	Division III	1989	Rochester (NY)	50–31
Women's indoor track and field (6)	NCAA	Division III	1990	Wisconsin–Oshkosh	59–43
Women's indoor track and field (6)	NCAA	Division III	1992	Wisconsin–Oshkosh	46–41
Women's indoor track and field (6)	NCAA	Division III	1997	CCNY	47–36
Women's indoor track and field (6)	NCAA	Division III	1998	Wheaton (MA)	31–28
Women's outdoor track and field (6)	NCAA	Division III	1987	UMass Boston	80–58
Women's outdoor track and field (6)	NCAA	Division III	1988	UMass Boston	95–66
Women's outdoor track and field (6)	NCAA	Division III	1989	Wisconsin–Oshkosh	58–51.5
Women's outdoor track and field (6)	NCAA	Division III	1992	Wisconsin–Oshkosh	61–47
Women's outdoor track and field (6)	NCAA	Division III	1994	Wisconsin–Oshkosh	73–53
Women's outdoor track and field (6)	NCAA	Division III	1998	Wheaton (MA)	59–50
