= Aaron Kelton =

American football player and coach

Current position
- Title: Defensive coordinator
- Team: Maine Maritime
- Conference: CNE

Biographical details
- Born: c. 1970 (age 55–56); Boston, Massachusetts, U.S.

Playing career
- 1988–1991: Springfield
- Position: Quarterback

Coaching career (HC unless noted)
- 1992: Wellesley HS (MA) (assistant)
- 1993–1996: Wayland HS (MA) (assistant)
- 1997: MIT (assistant)
- 1998: Clarion (assistant)
- 1999–2000: Concord (DC)
- 2001: Virginia State (DB)
- 2002–2005: Virginia State (DC)
- 2006–2007: Columbia (DB)
- 2008–2009: Columbia (DC)
- 2010–2015: Williams
- 2016–2017: Shorter
- 2018: Morgan State (co-DC / CB)
- 2019: Howard (director of football operations)
- 2019: Howard (interim HC)
- 2020–2021: Howard (CB)
- 2022–2025: Savannah State
- 2026–present: Maine Maritime (DC)

Administrative career (AD unless noted)
- 2017: Shorter (interim AD)

Head coaching record
- Overall: 36–68

Accomplishments and honors

Championships
- 1 NESCAC (2010)

Awards
- NESCAC COY (2010)

Aaron Kelton (born c. 1970) is an American college football coach. He is the defensive coordinator for Maine Maritime Academy, a position he has held since 2026. Kelton served as the head football coach at Williams College in Williamstown, Massachusetts from 2010 to 2015, Shorter University in Rome, Georgia from 2016 to 2017, and Savannah State University in Savannah, Georgia from 2022 to 2025. He was also the interim head football coach at Howard University in Washington, D.C. for the final three games of the 2019 season.

== Early years ==
A native of Boston, Kelton attended Wellesley High School, where he played football, baseball, and basketball. He then attended Springfield College, from which he graduated in 1992 with a Bachelor of Science degree in psychology. While there, he earned a varsity letter in football all four years and spent two as the starting quarterback.

== Coaching career ==
From 1992 through 1996, Kelton coached high school football in Massachusetts. His first college football coaching position was in 1997, with MIT. He spent a year each at Clarion and Concord, then was with Virginia State from 2001 through 2005, serving all but his first year there as defensive coordinator.

Kelton served as the secondary coach at Columbia for 2006 and 2007, and was then promoted to defensive coordinator for 2008 and 2009.

=== Williams ===
In May 2010, Williams College hired Kelton as head coach of the Ephs football team to replace Mike Whalen, who resigned to return to his alma mater, Wesleyan University. With the hiring, Kelton became the first black varsity head coach at Williams College and the seventh black head football coach at the NCAA Division III level. In 2010, Kelton guided the Ephs to an 8–0 record and the New England Small College Athletic Conference (NESCAC) championship, and became the first Williams College football coach to go undefeated in his debut season. For the performance, he was named the 2010 NESCAC Coach of the Year. Kelton resigned his position after the 2015 season after only going 1–5 against archrival Amherst College.

=== Shorter ===
Kelton was head coach of the Shorter Hawks in 2016 and 2017, with the team going winless during those two seasons. He also served as Shorter's interim athletic director during 2017.

=== Morgan State ===
Kelton spent the 2018 season as co-defensive coordinator for the Morgan State Bears.

=== Howard ===
In July 2019, Kelton joined Howard University as the director of football operations. In November 2019, Kelton became the interim head coach for the Howard Bison when first-year head coach Ron Prince was placed on administrative leave.

=== Savannah State ===
Kelton was named the 27th head coach in the history of Savannah State University on April 5, 2025. During his tenure, he compiled a 16–24 overall record, including an 11–20 mark in SIAC play during his tenure. He announced his resignation at SSU on November 14, 2025, after four seasons in charge.

== Head coaching record ==
Year	Team	Overall	Conference	Standing	Bowl/playoffs
Williams Ephs (New England Small College Athletic Conference) (2010–2015)
2010	Williams	8–0	8–0	1st	
2011	Williams	5–3	5–3	3rd	
2012	Williams	4–4	4–4	6th	
2013	Williams	2–6	2–6	8th	
2014	Williams	2–6	2–6	T–7th	
2015	Williams	2–6	2–6	T–6th	
Williams:		23–25	23–25		
Shorter Hawks (Gulf South Conference) (2016–2017)
2016	Shorter	0–11	0–8	9th	
2017	Shorter	0–11	0–8	9th	
Shorter:		0–22	0–16		
Howard Bison (Mid-Eastern Athletic Conference) (2019–2020)
2019	Howard	1–2 (Note: Ron Prince served as Howard's head coach for the first nine games of the 2019 season before he was placed on administrative leave. Kelton was appointed interim head coach for the final three games. Howard finished the year with an overall record of 2–10 and a mark of 2–6 in conference play.)	1–2	T–7th	
Howard:		1–2	1–2		
Savannah State Tigers (Southern Intercollegiate Athletic Conference) (2022–2025)
2022	Savannah State	5–5	3–4	5th (East)	
2023	Savannah State	2–8	1–7	T–11th	
2024	Savannah State	5–5	4–4	T–6th	
2025	Savannah State	4–6	3–5	T–7th	
Savannah State:		16–24	11–20		
Total:		36–68			
National championship Conference title Conference division title or championship game berth
