= Dan DiCenzo =

American football coach (born c. 1979)

Current position
- Title: Head coach
- Team: Wesleyan
- Conference: NESCAC
- Record: 63–25

Biographical details
- Born: c. 1979 (age 46–47)
- Education: Williams College (2001)

Playing career

Football
- 1997–2000: Williams

Wrestling
- 1997–2000: Williams
- Position: Strong safety (football)

Coaching career (HC unless noted)

Football
- 2001–2002: Trinity (CT) (ST/OLB)
- 2003: Brown (assistant OLB)
- 2004–2009: Williams (DB/RC)
- 2010–2014: Wesleyan (assoc. HC/DC)
- 2015–present: Wesleyan

Wrestling
- 2004–2006: Williams (assistant)
- 2007–2009: Williams

Head coaching record
- Overall: 63–25 (football); 50–16–1 (wrestling)

Accomplishments and honors

Championships
- 2 NESCAC (2024, 2025)

Awards
- Football; First-team All-NESCAC (2000)

Daniel A. DiCenzo (born c. 1979) is an American college football coach. He is the head football coach for Wesleyan University, a position he has held since 2015. He also coached for Trinity (CT), Brown, and Williams. He played college football for Wiliams as a strong safety.

== Playing career ==
DiCenzo attended Williams and played college football and wrestling. He was a strong safety for the Ephs football team. He was named as a First-team All-New England Small College Athletic Conference (NESCAC) in his senior year. He was also a four-year starter and two-year captain for the wrestling team. He graduated from Williams in 2001 with a Bachelor of Arts in history with a concentration in economics and political science.

== Coaching career ==
In 2001, DiCenzo was hired as the special teams coordinator and outside linebackers for Trinity (CT) under head coach Chuck Priore. In DiCenzo's final season in 2002, he was a part of the 7–1 NESCAC championship team.

In 2003, DiCenzo was hired as the assistant outside linebackers coach for Division I-AA Brown alongside Paul Frisone under head coach Phil Estes. In his lone season under Estes he helped guide the team to a 5–5 record.

In 2004, DiCenzo was hired as the defensive backs coach and recruiting coordinator for his alma mater, Williams, under first-year head coach Mike Whalen. In six seasons as an assistant coach for Williams he helped lead the team to a 38–10 record and an undefeated 8–0 season in 2006. He helped coach defensive back Jon Poppe, who went on to become the head football coach for Union (NY) and Columbia, to First-team All-NESCAC honors.

During DiCenzo's stint with Williams he was an assistant wrestling coach from 2004 to 2006. In 2004 and 2006, he was named New England Collegiate Conference Wrestling Association (NECCWA) Assistant Coach of the Year. In 2007, he was promoted to head wrestling coach and maintained the position until he was hired by Wesleyan in 2010. In three seasons he amassed an overall record of 50–16–1.

In 2010, DiCenzo followed Whalen when he was hired as the head football coach for Wesleyan. DiCenzo was hired as Whalen's associate head coach and defensive coordinator. In five seasons as an assistant coach he helped lead the team to a 26–14 record including a 7–1 record in 2013 alongside a NESCAC championship.

After Whalen resigned following the 2014 season to focus his efforts fully on his athletic director duties, DiCenzo was named head football coach. In his first season as head coach he led the team to a 5–3 record which finished tied-fourth in the NESCAC. His best win of his first season was against his alma mater where the team won 27–7 and were winning 27–0 until the final 71 second of the game. In the following season his team improved to a 6–2 record which finished tied for third in the division. Two of his six victories came against Williams and Amherst of the Little Three. His only losses on the season came to Tufts in the first week of the season and Trinity (CT) which came in the last week of the season. Wesleyan went on to finish 6–3 and 5–4 in 2017 and 2018 respectively before having the best record of DiCenzo's tenure as they finished 8–1 in 2019. Their only loss on the season came to eventual-conference champions Middlebury. 2019 also marked the first time his team was able to beat Trinity (CT). On July 7, 2020, Wesleyan announced they would cancel fall sports, including football, for the 2020 fall season due to COVID-19. The team returned for the 2021 season. From 2021 to 2023, DiCenzo led the Cardinals to three-consecutive 6–3 season which all finished third or tied for third. In 2024, he led the Cardinals to their first outright championship in school history and their first conference title since 2013 when they were co-champions.

DiCenzo's 56 wins are good enough for fourth all-time in Wesleyan football history behind Norm Daniels (76), Frank Hauser (68), and Bill MacDermott (66).

== Head coaching record ==
=== Football ===
| Year | Team | Overall | Conference | Standing | Bowl/playoffs |
|---|---|---|---|---|---|
Wesleyan Cardinals (New England Small College Athletic Conference) (2015–present)
| 2015 | Wesleyan | 5–3 | 5–3 | T–4th | |
| 2016 | Wesleyan | 6–2 | 6–2 | T–3rd | |
| 2017 | Wesleyan | 6–3 | 6–3 | T–4th | |
| 2018 | Wesleyan | 5–4 | 5–4 | T–4th | |
| 2019 | Wesleyan | 8–1 | 8–1 | 2nd | |
| 2020–21 | No team—COVID-19 | | | | |
| 2021 | Wesleyan | 6–3 | 6–3 | 3rd | |
| 2022 | Wesleyan | 6–3 | 6–3 | T–3rd | |
| 2023 | Wesleyan | 6–3 | 6–3 | T–3rd | |
| 2024 | Wesleyan | 8–1 | 8–1 | 1st | |
| 2025 | Wesleyan | 7–2 | 7–2 | T–1st | |
| 2026 | Wesleyan | 0–0 | 0–0 | | |
| Wesleyan: | | 63–25 | 63–25 | | |
| Total: | | 63–25 | | | |
