= Kelchner =

Kelchner is a surname. Notable people with the surname include:

- Jake Kelchner (born 1970), American football player
- Jennifer Kelchner, American para-alpine skier
- Matt Kelchner (born 1959), American football coach
- Pop Kelchner (1875–1958), American football, basketball and baseball player and coach
