= 1998 Williams Ephs football team =

American college football season

1998 Williams Ephs football

Little Three champion
- Conference: New England Small College Athletic Conference, Little Three Conference
- Record: 8–0 (8–0 NESCAC, 2–0 Little Three)
- Head coach: Dick Farley (12th season)
- Offensive coordinator: Dave Caputi (13th season)
- Home stadium: Weston Field

1998 New England Small College Athletic Conference football standings
	Conf.			Overall
Team	W		L	W		L
Williams	8	–	0	8	–	0
Tufts	7	–	1	7	–	1
Wesleyan	6	–	2	6	–	2
Amherst	5	–	3	5	–	3
Bowdoin	5	–	3	5	–	3
Middlebury	3	–	5	3	–	5
Trinity (CT)	2	–	6	2	–	6
Colby	2	–	6	2	–	6
Bates	1	–	7	1	–	7
Hamilton	1	–	7	1	–	7
No conference champion recognized

The 1998 Williams Ephs football team was an American football team that represented Williams College as a member of both the New England Small College Athletic Conference (NESCAC) and the Little Three Conference during the 1998 NCAA Division III football season. In their 12th year under head coach Dick Farley, the Ephs compiled a perfect 8–0 record, won the Little Three championship, finished in first place in the NESCAC, and outscored opponents by a total of 314 to 76.

The team played its home games at Weston Field in Williamstown, Massachusetts.

== Schedule ==
Date	Opponent	Site	Result	Attendance	Source
September 26	Bowdoin	Weston Field; Williamstown, MA	W 42–0		
October 3	Trinity (CT)	Weston Field; Williamstown, MA	W 34–6		
October 10	at Bates	Lewiston, ME	W 27–0		
October 17	Middlebury	Weston Field; Williamstown, MA	W 38–14		
October 24	at Tufts	Medford, MA	W 42–7		
October 31	at Hamilton	Clinton, NY	W 39–14		
November 7	Wesleyan^{†}	Weston Field; Williamstown, MA	W 57–19	7,192	
November 14	at Amherst	Pratt Field; Amherst, MA	W 35–16	8,000	
^{†}Homecoming
