= Paul Crowley =

Paul Crowley may refer to:

- Paul Crowley (footballer) (born 1980), Irish footballer
- Paul Crowley (ice hockey) (born 1955), Canadian ice hockey player
- Paul F. Crowley (born 1934), member of the Pennsylvania House of Representatives
- Paul Crowley (American football), American college football coach
