= 2001 Williams Ephs football team =

American college football season

2001 Williams Ephs football

NESCAC champion
- Conference: New England Small College Athletic Conference
- Record: 8–0 (8–0 NESCAC)
- Head coach: Dick Farley (15th season)
- Offensive coordinator: Mike Whalen (3rd season)
- Home stadium: Weston Field

2001 New England Small College Athletic Conference football standings
	Conf.			Overall
Team	W		L	W		L
Williams $	8	–	0	8	–	0
Amherst	7	–	1	7	–	1
Tufts	6	–	2	6	–	2
Colby	4	–	4	4	–	4
Middlebury	4	–	4	4	–	4
Trinity (CT)	4	–	4	4	–	4
Wesleyan	4	–	4	4	–	4
Bates	1	–	7	1	–	7
Bowdoin	1	–	7	1	–	7
Hamilton	1	–	7	1	–	7
$ – Conference champion

The 2001 Williams Ephs football team was an American football team that represented Williams College as a member of the New England Small College Athletic Conference (NESCAC) during the 2001 NCAA Division III football season. In their 15th year under head coach Dick Farley, the Ephs compiled a perfect 8–0 record, won the NESCAC championship, and outscored opponents by a total of 215 to 84.

The team played its home games at Weston Field in Williamstown, Massachusetts.

== Schedule ==
Date	Opponent	Site	Result	Attendance	Source
September 22	at Colby	Waterville, ME	W 28–13		
September 29	at Trinity (CT)	Jessee/Miller Field; Hartford, CT	W 31–10		
October 6	Bates	Weston Field; Williamstown, MA	W 35–14		
October 13	at Middlebury	Middlebury, VT	W 23–3		
October 20	Tufts	Weston Field; Williamstown, MA	W 21–17		
October 27	Hamilton	Weston Field; Williamstown, MA	W 23–0		
November 3	at Wesleyan	Middletown, CT	W 31–7		
November 10	Amherst	Weston Field; Williamstown, MA (The Biggest Little Game in America)	W 23–20 ^{OT}		
