= Christopher Newport Captains football =

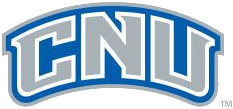
- First season: 2001; 25 years ago
- Athletic director: Kyle McMullin
- Head coach: Paul Crowley; 4th season, 31–11 (.738)
- Location: Newport News, Virginia
- Stadium: TowneBank Stadium (capacity: 4,200)
- Conference: NJAC
- Colors: Royal blue and silver
- All-time record: 149–92 (.618)
- Bowl record: 4–10 (.286)

Conference championships
- 13
- Mascot: Captain Chris
- Website: cnusports.com/football

The Christopher Newport Captains football team represents Christopher Newport University in the NCAA Division III, competing as football-only members of the New Jersey Athletic Conference (NJAC). Christopher Newport (CNU) plays its home games at the 4,200 seat TowneBank Stadium, which is located on-campus in Newport News, Virginia. Founded in 2001, the Captains were led by head coach Matt Kelchner until 2016. Coach Art Link, only the second head coach in CNU football history took the helm starting with the 2017 football season. After 11 seasons with the USA South Athletic Conference, the Captains shifted to the NJAC to start the 2015 season.

== History ==
By the late 1990s, the prospect of bringing football to Christopher Newport was gaining momentum from both students and the administration alike. On December 16, 1999, the CNU Board of Visitors voted in favor of starting a football program to compete at the Division III level by the 2001 season. By Spring 2000, the initial schedule was released for play in the Dixie Conference in 2001, and on May 9, 2000, Matt Kelchner was announced as the program's first head coach. In the Captains history, the program has captured seven co-conference and four outright conference championship in addition to making eleven appearances in the Division III playoffs.

== Seasons ==
Year	Team	Overall	Conference	Standing	Bowl/playoffs	D3^{#}	AFCA^{°}
Christopher Newport Captains (Dixie Conference) (2001–2002)
2001	Matt Kelchner	5–4	Dixie Conference	T–1st	L NCAA Division III First Round		
2002	Matt Kelchner	6–5	Dixie Conference	T–1st	L NCAA Division III First Round		
Christopher Newport Captains (USA South Athletic Conference) (2003–2014)
2003	Matt Kelchner	8–3	USA South Conference	T–1st	L NCAA Division III Second Round	19	
2004	Matt Kelchner	9–3	USA South Conference	T–1st	L NCAA Division III Second Round	16	
2005	Matt Kelchner	6–4	USA South Conference	T–3rd			
2006	Matt Kelchner	8–3	USA South Conference	T–1st	L NCAA Division III Second Round	24	
2007	Matt Kelchner	7–3	USA South Conference	2nd			
2008	Matt Kelchner	8–2	USA South Conference	1st	L NCAA Division III First Round		
2009	Matt Kelchner	5–5	USA South Conference	3rd			
2010	Matt Kelchner	6–5	USA South Conference	T–1st	L NCAA Division III First Round		
2011	Matt Kelchner	8–3	USA South Conference	1st	L NCAA Division III First Round		
2012	Matt Kelchner	6–5	USA South Conference	T–1st	L NCAA Division III First Round		
2013	Matt Kelchner	8–2	USA South Conference	T–3rd			
2014	Matt Kelchner	8–4	USA South Conference	1st	L NCAA Division III Second Round	24	
Christopher Newport Captains (New Jersey Athletic Conference) (2015–present)
2015	Matt Kelchner	4–6	New Jersey Athletic Conference	T–7th			
2016	Matt Kelchner	7–3	New Jersey Athletic Conference	T–4th			
2017	Art Link	5–5	New Jersey Athletic Conference	T–5th			
2018	Art Link	7–2	New Jersey Athletic Conference	4th			
2019	Art Link	2–8	New Jersey Athletic Conference	T–6th			
2020	Art Link	0–2*	New Jersey Athletic Conference	6th	*Shortened season due to COVID-19 pandemic		
2021	Art Link	5–5	New Jersey Athletic Conference	3rd			
2022	Paul Crowley	7–3	New Jersey Athletic Conference	2nd			
2023	Paul Crowley	7–4	New Jersey Athletic Conference	1st	L NCAA Division III First Round		
2024	Paul Crowley	7–3	New Jersey Athletic Conference	2nd			
2025	Paul Crowley	10–1	New Jersey Athletic Conference	1st	L NCAA Division III First Round	6	7
Total:		159–93					
National championship Conference title Conference division title or championship game berth
^{†}Indicates Bowl Coalition, Bowl Alliance, BCS, or CFP / New Years' Six bowl.; ^{#}Rankings from final Coaches Poll.

== Postseason appearances ==
=== NCAA Division III playoffs ===
The Captains have made thirteen appearances in the NCAA Division III playoffs, with a combined record of 3–12.

Year	Round	Opponent	Result
2001	First Round	Widener	L, 7–56
2002	First Round	Washington & Jefferson	L, 10–24
2003	First Round; Second Round	Muhlenberg; Bridgewater (VA)	W, 24–20; L, 3–26
2004	First Round; Second Round	Salisbury; Washington & Jefferson	W, 35–24; L, 14–24
2006	First Round	Washington & Jefferson	L, 23–27
2008	First Round	Washington & Jefferson	L, 29–35
2010	First Round	Mary Hardin–Baylor	L, 7–59
2011	First Round	Kean	L, 10–34
2012	First Round	Mount Union	L, 14–72
2014	First Round; Second Round	Delaware Valley; Widener	W, 29–26; L, 27–37
2023	First Round	Randolph–Macon	L, 20–28
2025	Second Round	Susquehanna	L, 28–42
2026	Second Round	Washington & Jefferson	TBP

== See also ==
- Christopher Newport Captains
