= Dick Farley =

American football player and coach, track and field coach (1946–2026)

Biographical details
- Born: May 30, 1946; Danvers, Massachusetts, U.S.
- Died: April 1, 2026 (aged 79)

Playing career
- 1967: Boston University
- 1968–1969: San Diego Chargers
- Position: Defensive back

Coaching career (HC unless noted)

Football
- 1972–1986: Williams (assistant)
- 1987–2003: Williams

Track and field
- 1972–1987: Williams
- 1987–2026: Williams (assistant)

Head coaching record
- Overall: 114–19–3 (football)
- College Football Hall of Fame; Inducted in 2006 (profile)

Richard Joseph Farley (May 30, 1946 – April 1, 2026) was an American professional football player, and college football and track and field coach. He served as the head football coach at Williams College from 1987 to 2003, compiling a record of 114–19–3.

Farley played professionally as a defensive back for the San Diego Chargers of the American Football League (AFL). He played college football for the Boston University Terriers.

== Playing career ==
Farley graduated from St. John's Preparatory School in 1964, where he played football and ran track. At Boston University he was an All-America defensive back and was captain of the football and track and field teams before graduating in 1968. He spent two years playing in the AFL for the San Diego Chargers before moving on to coaching.

== Coaching career ==
In 1972 Farley was hired as an assistant football coach and head track coach at Williams College. In 1987 he succeeded Bob Odell, as head football coach. Farley lost his first three games as head coach before going on a streak of 128-straight games without losing back-to-back contests.

Over 15 seasons, he recorded a career record of 114–19–3 (.849), which ranked as the sixth best mark at the time of his retirement after the 2003 season. His teams regularly dominated the NESCAC and recorded five perfect seasons, including a 23-game winning streak that until 2005 was the longest in NCAA Division III history. With an emphasis on defense, his Williams teams recorded 25 shutouts, including four in a row during the 1988 season. He had a 14–2 winning record against rival Amherst. in 2019, ESPN listed Farley as one of the top 150 football coaches of all-time.

He was co-head coach of the men's and women's track and field teams at Williams until his death on April 1, 2026.

== Honors ==
Farley was inducted into the College Football Hall of Fame as a coach in 2006.

== Death ==
Farley died on April 1, 2026, at the age of 79.

== Head coaching record ==
Year	Team	Overall	Conference	Standing	Bowl/playoffs
Williams Ephs (New England Small College Athletic Conference) (1987–2003)
1987	Williams	4–4			
1988	Williams	6–1–1			
1989	Williams	8–0			
1990	Williams	8–0			
1991	Williams	7–1			
1992	Williams	5–2–1			
1993	Williams	7–1			
1994	Williams	8–0			
1995	Williams	7–0–1			
1996	Williams	6–2			
1997	Williams	7–1			
1998	Williams	8–0	8–0	1st	
1999	Williams	7–1	7–1	1st	
2000	Williams	5–3	5–3	T–4th	
2001	Williams	8–0	8–0	1st	
2002	Williams	7–1	7–1	T–1st	
2003	Williams	6–2	6–2	2nd	
Williams:		114–19–3			
Total:		114–19–3			
National championship Conference title Conference division title or championship game berth

== See also ==
- List of American Football League players
