= Mark Raymond =

American football coach

Current position
- Title: Head coach
- Team: Williams
- Conference: NESCAC
- Record: 42–37

Playing career
- 1989–1992: Buffalo

Coaching career (HC unless noted)
- 1993–1995: St. Lawrence (assistant)
- 1996–1997: Syracuse (GA)
- 1998: SUNY Canton (associate HC)
- 1999–2005: Ithaca (DC)
- 2010–2015: St. Lawrence
- 2016–present: Williams

Head coaching record
- Overall: 73–67
- Tournaments: 0–2 (NCAA D-III playoffs)

Accomplishments and honors

Championships
- 2 Liberty League (2010, 2015); 1 NESCAC (2021)

Awards
- Liberty League Coach of the Year (2010, 2015); NESCAC Coach of the Year (2017, 2021)

Mark Raymond is an American college football coach. He is the head football coach for Williams College, a position he has held since 2016. Raymond served as the head football coach at St. Lawrence University from 2010 to 2015, winning two conference titles and compiling an overall record of 31–30. Raymond was named Liberty League Coach of the Year following the conclusion of both the 2010 and 2015 seasons at St. Lawrence. Raymond was named head football coach at Williams College on February 24, 2016.

== Head coaching record ==
Year	Team	Overall	Conference	Standing	Bowl/playoffs
St. Lawrence Saints (Liberty League) (2010–2015)
2010	St. Lawrence	5–6	5–1	1st	L NCAA Division III First Round
2011	St. Lawrence	3–6	2–4	T–5th	
2012	St. Lawrence	0–10	0–7	8th	
2013	St. Lawrence	7–3	5–2	2nd	
2014	St. Lawrence	8–2	6–1	2nd	
2015	St. Lawrence	8–3	6–1	T–1st	L NCAA Division III First Round
St. Lawrence:		31–30	24–16		
Williams Ephs (New England Small College Athletic Conference) (2016–present)
2016	Williams	0–8	0–8	T–9th	
2017	Williams	6–3	6–3	T–4th	
2018	Williams	5–4	5–4	T–4th	
2019	Williams	7–2	7–2	3rd	
2020–21	No team—COVID-19				
2021	Williams	9–0	9–0	1st	
2022	Williams	3–6	3–6	T–6th	
2023	Williams	2–6	2–6	9th	
2024	Williams	5–4	5–4	5th	
2025	Williams	5–4	5–4	T–4th	
2026	Williams	0–0	0–0		
Williams:		42–37	42–37		
Total:		73–67			
National championship Conference title Conference division title or championship game berth
