= Mike Whalen =

American athlete and coach (born 1960)

Current position
- Title: Athletic director
- Team: Wesleyan
- Conference: NESCAC

Biographical details
- Born: November 4, 1960 (age 66); Enfield, Connecticut, U.S.

Playing career

Football
- 1979–1982: Wesleyan
- Position: Offensive lineman

Coaching career (HC unless noted)

Football
- c. 1985: Springfield (GA)
- 1986: Penn (assistant)
- 1987–1989: Lafayette (DL)
- 1990–1992: Lafayette (OL)
- 1993–1995: Colgate (OL)
- 1996–1998: Williams (OL)
- 1999–2003: Williams (OC)
- 2004–2009: Williams
- 2010–2014: Wesleyan

Wrestling
- 1996–2004: Williams

Administrative career (AD unless noted)
- 2013–present: Wesleyan

Head coaching record
- Overall: 64–24 (football)

Accomplishments and honors

Championships
- Football; 2 NESCAC (2006, 2013)

Mike Whalen (born November 4, 1960) is an American college athletics administrator and former college football and collegiate wrestling coach. He is the athletic director at Wesleyan University in Middletown, Connecticut, a position he has held since 2013. Whalen served as the head football coach at Williams College in Williamstown, Massachusetts from 2004 to 2009 and at Wesleyan from 2010 to 2014, compiling a career college football head coaching record of 64–24. He was also the head wrestling coach at Williams from 1996 to 2004. Whalen played football and wrestled at Wesleyan.

== Athlete ==
A native of Enfield, Connecticut, Whalen attended Enrico Fermi High School. As a senior, he was the State Class "LL" Heavyweight Wrestling Champion and placed 3rd at the State Open Championships. For football Whalen was All-CCIL on both offense and defense and an All-State honorable mention. He took a postgraduate year at Loomis Chaffee, where he was the New England Prep Champion and 3rd in the National Prep Wrestling Championships while being named 1st team All-Prep and All-State in football. Whalen would go on to attend Wesleyan University in Middletown, Connecticut. He was a four-year starter as an offensive lineman for the Wesleyan Cardinals football team before receiving his degree in 1983. He was also the captain of the wrestling team at Wesleyan, earning All-New England and All-American honors three times. He was the first New England wrestler to win four consecutive New England championships.

== Early coaching career ==
Whalen began his coaching career at Springfield College as a graduate assistant in football and wrestling. After receiving a master's degree from Springfield in physical education, Whalen was hired as an assistant football coach at the University of Pennsylvania and was on the coaching staff of the undefeated 1986 Penn Quakers team. He next worked as an assistant coach at Lafayette College and Colgate University, holding the position of associate head coach at Colgate.

== Williams ==
He was an assistant football coach at Williams College from 1996 to 2003, including three years as the team's offensive coordinator. While working as an assistant football coach, Whalen also served as the school's head wrestling coach from 1996 to 2004. In February 2004, he was hired as head football coach of the Williams Ephs, succeeding College Football Hall of Fame inductee, Dick Farley. Whalen served six years as Williams' head coach (2004–2009) during which he compiled a record of 38–10 (.792 winning percentage). In 2006, he led Williams to an undefeated, untied 8–0 record and the New England Small College Athletic Conference championship. He also led Williams to four consecutive Little Three championships from 2005 through 2008.

== Wesleyan ==
While at Williams College, Whalen had an undefeated 6–0 record against his alma mater, Wesleyan. In March 2010, Wesleyan hired Whalen as its head football coach and assistant athletic director. At the time, Whalen told reporters, "This would have never, ever, ever happened if I didn't go here. That was a big, big draw for me, to come home, to come back to Wesleyan and see if we can put this thing back on track." In his first year at Wesleyan, Whalen finished the year 4–4, losing close games to Middlebury, 24–21, and Trinity, 27–20, while also losing to Little Three rivals Williams and Amherst.

== Head coaching record ==
=== Football ===
| Year | Team | Overall | Conference | Standing | Bowl/playoffs |
|---|---|---|---|---|---|
Williams Ephs (New England Small College Athletic Conference) (2004–2009)
| 2004 | Williams | 6–2 | 6–2 | T–2nd | |
| 2005 | Williams | 6–2 | 6–2 | T–3rd | |
| 2006 | Williams | 8–0 | 8–0 | 1st | |
| 2007 | Williams | 6–2 | 6–2 | T–2nd | |
| 2008 | Williams | 6–2 | 6–2 | 2nd | |
| 2009 | Williams | 6–2 | 6–2 | T–2nd | |
| Williams: | | 38–10 | 38–10 | | |
Wesleyan Cardinals (New England Small College Athletic Conference) (2010–2014)
| 2010 | Wesleyan | 4–4 | 4–4 | T–4th | |
| 2011 | Wesleyan | 3–5 | 3–5 | T–6th | |
| 2012 | Wesleyan | 5–3 | 5–3 | T–4th | |
| 2013 | Wesleyan | 7–1 | 7–1 | T–1st | |
| 2014 | Wesleyan | 7–1 | 7–1 | 2nd | |
| Wesleyan: | | 26–14 | 26–14 | | |
| Total: | | 64–24 | | | |
National championship Conference title Conference division title or championship game berth
