= John Krikorian =

American basketball coach

Current position
- Title: Head coach
- Team: Christopher Newport
- Conference: Coast to Coast
- Record: 402–120 (.770)

Biographical details
- Born: September 14, 1974 (age 51); Auburn, Massachusetts, U.S.

Coaching career (HC unless noted)
- 1998–1999: West Virginia Wesleyan (graduate assistant)
- 1999–2000: U.S. Merchant Marine Academy (assistant)
- 2000–2002: Penn (assistant)
- 2002–2004: Lafayette (assistant)
- 2004–2006: Navy (assistant)
- 2006–2010: U.S. Merchant Marine Academy
- 2010–present: Christopher Newport

Head coaching record
- Overall: 427–126 (.772); 65–42 (Merchant Marine); 362–84 (Christopher Newport)
- Tournaments: 26–9 (NCAA Division III)

Accomplishments and honors

Championships
- NCAA Division III Champion (2023); 4× NCAA Division III Final Four (2016, 2019, 2023, 2026); 2× USA South: 2012, 2013; 5× CAC: 2016–2020; 2× C2C: 2022, 2023, 2024

Awards
- NABC Division III Coach of the Year (2023); C2C Coach of the Year (2022, 2025); 5× CAC Coach of the Year (2017–2021); Landmark Coach of the Year (2010)

John Krikorian (born September 14, 1974) is an American basketball coach. He is the current head men's basketball coach for the Christopher Newport University in NCAA Division III and previously spent six years as an assistant at the Division I level. He has led CNU to the program's only three NCAA Division III Final Four appearances and the 2023 NCAA National Championship.

On February 22, 2025, he became the 10th fastest coach in NCAA basketball history, at any level, to reach the 400 career win milestone, faster than 15 Naismith Basketball Hall of Fame coaches.

Krikorian is one of the most successful coaches in NCAA men's basketball history at any level. Through 2023–24, his 77.0% winning percentage is the best in the NCAA among active NCAA Division III coaches with at least 10 years at the helm and second in NCAA Division III history, one spot ahead of Bo Ryan. He ranks 22nd in NCAA history regardless of classification, ahead of Mike Krzyzewski (76.6%), Bill Self (76.2%) and John Calipari (75.7%).

Krikorian has led the Captains to the NCAA Sweet 16 in 7 of the last 9 NCAA Tournaments (2016-2025), 10 consecutive 20-win seasons, 15 straight seasons ranked in the top 25, 11 regular season conference championships and nine conference tournament titles.

== Playing career ==
Krikorian played on the junior varsity (JV) basketball team at the University of Pennsylvania and earned cum laude honors in Systems Engineering in 1996.

== Coaching career ==
Krikorian was named men’s basketball coach at Christopher Newport University on June 14, 2010. He is the fourth head coach in program history, and has led the Captains to success, including three Final Four appearances and the 2023 NCAA Championship. His Captains squad advanced to the Final Four in 2016, 2019 and 2023. In his 13 seasons, Krikorian led the Captains to 11 NCAA Tournaments, including each of the last nine years. Krikorian has continued the program’s history since taking over from coach and Athletic Director C.J. Woollum, who led the program for 26 seasons. His overall record at CNU is 334-76 (.814) through 13 seasons.

Under Krikorian's leadership, CNU is one of only four teams in NCAA Division III history to reach the NCAA Tournament quarterfinals in four straight seasons (2021-24).

Krikorian was named the inaugural Coast-To-Coast Athletic Conference Coach of the Year after being honored as the Capital Athletic Conference’s Coach of the Year the last five years of its existence. Krikorian’s teams at CNU won at least 18 games and advanced to the conference championship game every year since joining the league.

In 2022, Christopher Newport posted a 27-3 record and advanced to the Elite Eight of the NCAA Division III Tournament. CNU won 24 straight games from late November until mid-March, the second longest winning streak in school history.

In 2020, the Captains finished 23-6 and advanced to the Sweet 16 of the NCAA Tournament by recording victories over Colby and Nichols at Steven Institute of Technology in New Jersey. The Captains were scheduled to host Hobart in the NCAA’s before the remainder of the tournament was canceled due to the coronavirus. Christopher Newport was ranked 17th in the country in the final national poll.

The Captains posted a 29-4 record in 2018-2019, winning both the CAC regular and post-season titles. CNU won four games in the NCAA Tournament, two at the Freeman Center and then two more in a sectional in Clinton, NY., where they ousted NESCAC programs, Hamilton and Williams, on back-to-back nights to reach the Final Four. His 2015-2016 squad finished with a 30-2 record, setting the new school all-time single season win mark, and advancing to the Final Four for the first time ever.

Krikorian, who enjoyed a very successful four-year stint as the head coach at the United States Merchant Marine Academy, is a native of Auburn, Massachusetts. “Coach K” compiled a record of 65-42 (.607) at the Merchant Marine Academy, and led the squad to a 24-5 record his last season there in 2009-2010. The Mariners won the Landmark Conference regular-season and post-season championships that year and advanced to the second round of the NCAA Tournament. He was named the 2010 Landmark Conference Coach of the Year.

== Prior to CNU ==
After graduation, Krikorian spent two years in the business world working for Princeton Consultants, an information management company in Princeton, New Jersey. In 1998, Krikorian returned to his passion and accepted the position of graduate assistant basketball coach at West Virginia Wesleyan College. What followed was a steady climb up the ladder of the college coaching ranks.

After one season at West Virginia Wesleyan, “Coach K” made his first stop at the Merchant Marine Academy as an assistant coach under Billy Lange during the 1999-2000 season. After a season there, he returned to his alma mater for two seasons, working as an assistant at Penn under Big 5 Hall of Fame Coach Fran Dunphy. There he would be a part of one of the nation’s biggest turnarounds as the Quakers won 25 games in 2001. Krikorian then accepted an assistant position at another Division I program, Lafayette College in Easton, Pa. There he assisted Fran O’Hanlon from 2002-2004. His journey then took him to Annapolis, MD, where he spent two years as an assistant at the United States Naval Academy (2004-2006), re-uniting with head coach Billy Lange. He was named the head coach at the U.S. Merchant Marine Academy in 2006, beginning his head coaching career with an amazing four-year transformation of the Mariners.

== Head coaching record ==
Record table
Season	Team	Overall	Conference	Standing	Postseason
U.S. Merchant Marine Academy (Landmark Conference) (2006–2010)
2006–07	Merchant Marine Academy	14–12 (.538)	9–7 (.563)	4th	
2007–08	Merchant Marine Academy	12–13 (.480)	7–7 (.500)	6th	
2008–09	Merchant Marine Academy	15–12 (.556)	10–4 (.714)	3rd	
2009–10	Merchant Marine Academy	24–5 (.828)	14–2 (.875)	1st	NCAA Division III 2nd Round
Merchant Marine Academy:		65–42 (.607)			
Christopher Newport Captains (USA South Athletic Conference) (2010–2013)
2010–11	Christopher Newport	18–9 (.667)	9–3 (.750)	3rd	
2011–12	Christopher Newport	23–5 (.821)	12–0 (1.000)	1st	NCAA Division III 1st Round
2012–13	Christopher Newport	22–6 (.786)	11–3 (.786)	1st	NCAA Division III 2nd Round
Christopher Newport Captains (Coast to Coast Athletic Conference) (2013–present)
2013–14	Christopher Newport	19–9 (.679)	9–7 (.563)	4th	
2014–15	Christopher Newport	20–8 (.714)	13–5 (.722)	4th	
2015–16	Christopher Newport	30–2 (.938)	18–0 (1.000)	1st	NCAA Division III Final Four
2016–17	Christopher Newport	27–3 (.900)	17–1 (.944)	1st	NCAA Division III Sweet Sixteen
2017–18	Christopher Newport	22–7 (.759)	14–4 (.778)	T–1st	NCAA Division III 2nd Round
2018–19	Christopher Newport	29–4 (.879)	12–2 (.857)	T–1st	NCAA Division III Final Four
2019–20	Christopher Newport	23–6 (.793)	9–1 (.900)	T–1st	NCAA Division III Sweet Sixteen (Tournament canceled due to COVID-19)
2020–21	Christopher Newport	0–0 (–)	0–0 (–)	N/A	Season canceled due to COVID-19
2021–22	Christopher Newport	27–3 (.900)	5–0 (1.000)	1st	NCAA Division III Elite Eight
2022–23	Christopher Newport	30–3 (.909)	5–0 (1.000)	1st	NCAA Division III Champions
2023–24	Christopher Newport	24–7 (.774)	4–2 (.667)	1st	NCAA Division III Elite Eight
2024–25	Christopher Newport	23–6 (.793)	4–0 (1.000)	1st	NCAA Division III 2nd Round
2025–26	Christopher Newport	25–6 (.806)	4–1 (.800)	2nd	NCAA Division III Final Four
Christopher Newport:		362–84 (.812)			
Total:		427–126 (.772)			
National champion Postseason invitational champion Conference regular season champion Conference regular season and conference tournament champion Division regular season champion Division regular season and conference tournament champion Conference tournament champion
