= 2010 Williams Ephs football team =

American college football season

2010 Williams Ephs football

NESCAC champion
- Conference: New England Small College Athletic Conference
- Record: 8–0 (8–0 NESCAC)
- Head coach: Aaron Kelton (1st season)
- Home stadium: Farley-Lamb Field

2010 New England Small College Athletic Conference football standings
	Conf.			Overall
Team	W		L	W		L
Williams $	8	–	0	8	–	0
Trinity (CT)	7	–	1	7	–	1
Amherst	6	–	2	6	–	2
Colby	4	–	4	4	–	4
Middlebury	4	–	4	4	–	4
Wesleyan	4	–	4	4	–	4
Bowdoin	3	–	5	3	–	5
Bates	2	–	6	2	–	6
Hamilton	1	–	7	1	–	7
Tufts	1	–	7	1	–	7
$ – Conference champion

The 2010 Williams Ephs football team was an American football team that represented Williams College as a member of the New England Small College Athletic Conference (NESCAC) during the 2010 NCAA Division III football season. In their first year under head coach Aaron Kelton, the Ephs compiled an 8–0 record, won the NESCAC championship, and outscored opponents by a total of 293 to 107.

== Schedule ==
Date	Time	Opponent	Site	Result	Attendance	Source
September 25	12:00 p.m.	Bowdoin	Weston Field; Williamstown, MA	W 33–15		
October 2	1:30 p.m.	Trinity (CT)	Weston Field; Williamstown, MA	W 29–21		
October 9	1:00 p.m.	at Bates	Garcelon Field; Lewiston, ME	W 41–0		
October 16	1:30 p.m.	Middlebury	Weston Field; Williamstown, MA	W 41–17		
October 23	1:30 p.m.	at Tufts	Ellis Oval; Medford, MA	W 35–24		
October 30	1:00 p.m.	at Hamilton	Clinton, NY	W 38–7		
November 6	1:00 p.m.	Wesleyan^{†}	Weston Field; Williamstown, MA	W 45–7		
November 13	1:20 p.m.	at Amherst	Pratt Field; Amherst, MA (The Biggest Little Game in America)	W 31–16		
^{†}Homecoming; All times are in Eastern time
