= 2006 Williams Ephs football team =

American college football season

2006 Williams Ephs football

NESCAC champion Little Three champion
- Conference: New England Small College Athletic Conference, Little Three Conference
- Record: 8–0 (8–0 NESCAC, 2–0 Little Three)
- Head coach: Mike Whalen (3rd season)
- Home stadium: Weston Field

2006 New England Small College Athletic Conference football standings
	Conf.			Overall
Team	W		L	W		L
Williams $	8	–	0	8	–	0
Trinity (CT)	7	–	1	7	–	1
Middlebury	6	–	2	6	–	2
Amherst	5	–	3	5	–	3
Tufts	4	–	4	4	–	4
Wesleyan	3	–	5	3	–	5
Bowdoin	2	–	6	2	–	6
Colby	2	–	6	2	–	6
Hamilton	2	–	6	2	–	6
Bates	1	–	7	1	–	7
$ – Conference champion

The 2006 Williams Ephs football team was an American football team that represented Williams College as a member of the New England Small College Athletic Conference (NESCAC) and the Little Three Conference during the 2006 NCAA Division III football season. In their third year under head coach Mike Whalen, the Ephs compiled an 8–0 record, won the NESCAC and Little Three championships, and outscored opponents by a total of 276 to 74.

The team played its home games at Weston Field in Williamstown, Massachusetts.

== Schedule ==
Date	Opponent	Site	Result	Attendance	Source
September 23	Bowdoin	Weston Field; Williamstown, MA	W 27–0		
September 30	Trinity (CT)	Weston Field; Williamstown, MA	W 41–16		
October 7	at Bates	Lewiston, ME	W 27–7		
October 14	Middlebury	Weston Field; Williamstown, MA	W 40–9		
October 21	at Tufts	Medford, MA	W 38–14		
October 28	at Hamilton	Clinton, NY	W 15–0		
November 4	Wesleyan^{†}	Weston Field; Williamstown, MA	W 51–21		
November 11	at Amherst	Pratt Field; Amherst, MA (The Biggest Little Game in America)	W 37–7	6,000	
^{†}Homecoming
