= Paul Crowley (American football) =

American football coach (born 1987)

Current position
- Title: Head coach
- Team: Christopher Newport
- Conference: NJAC
- Record: 31–11

Biographical details
- Born: June 21, 1987 (age 39); Midland, Texas, U.S.

Playing career
- 2005–2008: Christopher Newport
- Position: Center

Coaching career (HC unless noted)
- 2009: Christopher Newport (GA)
- 2010–2013: Christopher Newport (WR)
- 2014: Christopher Newport (RB/TE)
- 2015–2016: Christopher Newport (OC/WR)
- 2017–2018: William & Mary (RB)
- 2019–2021: Christopher Newport (OL)
- 2022–present: Christopher Newport

Head coaching record
- Overall: 31–11
- Tournaments: 0–2 (NCAA D-III playoffs)

Accomplishments and honors

Championships
- 3 NJAC (2023,2025,2026)

Awards
- 3× NJAC Coach of the Year (2022–2023,2025) Willard Bailey Coach of the Year (2025) VaSID College Division Coach of the Year (2025)

Paul Crowley (born June 21, 1987) is an American college football coach. He is the head football coach for Christopher Newport University, a position he has held since 2022. Crowley was an all-conference offensive lineman at Christopher Newport, and coached at the school following his playing career, serving as recruiting coordinator, as well as multiple offensive position coaches under Matt Kelchner. Crowley, then coached at the Division I level, at William & Mary as the running backs coach for two years, before returning to Newport under Art Link as an offensive lineman coach for three years, before becoming the head coach of the program.

== Head coaching record ==
Year	Team	Overall	Conference	Standing	Bowl/playoffs	D3^{#}	AFCA^{°}
Christopher Newport Captains (New Jersey Athletic Conference) (2022–present)
2022	Christopher Newport	7–3	5–1	2nd			
2023	Christopher Newport	7–4	5–1	1st	L NCAA Division III First Round		
2024	Christopher Newport	7–3	5–1	2nd			
2025	Christopher Newport	10–1	7–0	1st	L NCAA Division III Second Round	17	18
2026	Christopher Newport	0–0	0–0				
Christopher Newport:		31–11	22–3				
Total:		31–11					
National championship Conference title Conference division title or championship game berth
