= 2021 Williams Ephs football team =

American college football season

2021 Williams Ephs football

NESCAC champion
- Conference: New England Small College Athletic Conference
- Record: 9–0 (9–0 NESCAC)
- Head coach: Mark Raymond (12th season)
- Offensive coordinator: Tom Blumenauer (1st season)
- Home stadium: Farley-Lamb Field

2021 New England Small College Athletic Conference football standings
| | Conf. | | | Overall |
| Team | W | | L | W | | L |
|---|---|---|---|---|---|---|
| Williams $ | 9 | – | 0 | 9 | – | 0 |
| Trinity (CT) | 8 | – | 1 | 8 | – | 1 |
| Wesleyan | 6 | – | 3 | 6 | – | 3 |
| Amherst | 5 | – | 4 | 5 | – | 4 |
| Colby | 4 | – | 5 | 4 | – | 5 |
| Tufts | 4 | – | 5 | 4 | – | 5 |
| Bates | 3 | – | 6 | 3 | – | 6 |
| Middlebury | 3 | – | 6 | 3 | – | 6 |
| Hamilton | 2 | – | 7 | 2 | – | 7 |
| Bowdoin | 1 | – | 8 | 1 | – | 8 |
$ – Conference champion

The 2021 Williams Ephs football team was an American football team that represented Williams College as a member of the New England Small College Athletic Conference (NESCAC) during the 2021 NCAA Division III football season. In their 12th year under head coach Mark Raymond, the Ephs compiled a 9–0 record and won the NESCAC championship. It was the first 9–0 season in Williams College history.

== Schedule ==
| Date | Time | Opponent | Site | Result | Attendance | Source |
|---|---|---|---|---|---|---|
| September 18 | 2:00 p.m. | Middlebury | Farley-Lamb Field; Williamstown, MA | W 41–13 | 626 | |
| September 25 | 1:30 p.m. | at Tufts | Ellis Oval; Medford, MA | W 32–29 | 1,100 | |
| October 2 | 1:00 p.m. | at Bowdoin | Whittier Field; Brunswick, ME | W 28–3 | 1,030 | |
| October 9 | 1:00 p.m. | Colby | Farley-Lamb Field; Williamstown, MA | W 42–0 | 500 | |
| October 16 | 1:30 p.m. | at Hamilton | Steuben Field; Clinton, NY | W 35–7 | 457 | |
| October 23 | 1:00 p.m. | at Bates | Garcelon Field; Lewiston, ME | W 38–21 | 1,000 | |
| October 30 | 1:30 p.m. | Trinity (CT) | Farley-Lamb Field; Williamstown, MA | W 42–3 | 301 | |
| November 6 | 1:00 p.m. | Wesleyan | Farley-Lamb Field; Williamstown, MA | W 25–0 | 1,500 | |
| November 13 | 12:00 p.m. | at Amherst | Pratt Field; Amherst, MA (The Biggest Little Game in America) | W 24–19 | 7,000 | |
All times are in Eastern time
