= 2006 NCAA Division III football season =

American college football season

- Regular season: August – November 2006
- Playoffs: November – December 2006
- National championship: Salem Football Stadium; Salem, VA
- Champion: Mount Union (9)
- Gagliardi Trophy: Josh Brehm (QB), Alma

The 2006 NCAA Division III football season, part of the college football season organized by the NCAA at the Division III level in the United States, began in August 2006, and concluded with the NCAA Division III Football Championship, also known as the Stagg Bowl, in December 2006 at Salem Football Stadium in Salem, Virginia. The Mount Union Purple Raiders won their ninth Division III championship by defeating the Wisconsin–Whitewater Warhawks, 35−16. This was the second of seven straight championship games between Mount Union (3 wins) and Wisconsin–Whitewater (4 wins) and the second straight win for Mount Union.

The Gagliardi Trophy, given to the most outstanding player in Division III football, was awarded to Josh Brehm, quarterback from Alma.

== Conference standings ==
2006 American Southwest Conference football standings
	Conf.			Overall
Team	W		L	W		L
No. 8 Mary Hardin–Baylor $^	8	–	0	10	–	3
No. 13 Hardin–Simmons ^	6	–	1	8	–	2
Texas Lutheran	4	–	4	6	–	4
Sul Ross	4	–	4	5	–	4
Howard Payne	3	–	5	5	–	5
Mississippi College	3	–	5	5	–	5
East Texas Baptist	3	–	5	3	–	7
Louisiana College	2	–	5	4	–	5
McMurry	2	–	6	3	–	7
$ – Conference champion; ^ – NCAA Division III playoff participant; Rankings from D3football.com

2006 Atlantic Central Football Conference standings
	Conf.			Overall
Team	W		L	W		L
No. 7 Wesley $^	4	–	0	13	–	1
Apprentice §	2	–	2	7	–	3
Salisbury	2	–	2	6	–	5
Brockport	2	–	2	4	–	6
Frostburg State	0	–	4	2	–	7
$ – Conference champion; ^ – NCAA Division III playoff participant; § – Not an NCAA member; Rankings from D3football.com

2006 Centennial Conference football standings
	Conf.			Overall
Team	W		L	W		L
Dickinson $^	5	–	1	8	–	3
Ursinus	4	–	2	8	–	3
Gettysburg	3	–	3	5	–	5
Johns Hopkins	3	–	3	5	–	5
Muhlenberg	2	–	4	5	–	5
McDaniel	2	–	4	4	–	6
Franklin & Marshall	2	–	4	3	–	7
$ – Conference champion; ^ – NCAA Division III playoff participant

2006 College Conference of Illinois and Wisconsin football standings
	Conf.			Overall
Team	W		L	W		L
No. 16 Wheaton (IL) +^	6	–	1	10	–	2
No. 19 North Central (IL) +^	6	–	1	9	–	3
Augustana (IL) +	6	–	1	7	–	3
Carthage	3	–	4	6	–	4
Elmhurst	3	–	4	6	–	4
Illinois Wesleyan	2	–	5	3	–	7
Millikin	2	–	5	3	–	7
North Park	0	–	7	1	–	9
+ – Conference co-champions; ^ – NCAA Division III playoff participant; Rankings from D3football.com

2006 Empire 8 Athletic Conference football standings
	Conf.			Overall
Team	W		L	W		L
No. 4 St. John Fisher +^	5	–	1	12	–	2
No. 10 Springfield +^	5	–	1	10	–	2
Alfred	4	–	2	8	–	3
Ithaca	4	–	2	7	–	3
Hartwick	2	–	4	4	–	6
Utica	1	–	5	3	–	7
Norwich	0	–	6	2	–	8
+ – Conference co-champions; ^ – NCAA Division III playoff participant; Rankings from D3football.com

2006 Heartland Collegiate Athletic Conference football standings
	Conf.			Overall
Team	W		L	W		L
Mount St. Joseph $^	7	–	0	9	–	2
Franklin (IN)	6	–	1	9	–	1
Defiance	5	–	2	7	–	3
Hanover	4	–	3	4	–	6
Rose-Hulman	3	–	4	6	–	4
Bluffton	2	–	5	3	–	7
Anderson (IN)	1	–	6	2	–	8
Manchester	0	–	7	1	–	9
$ – Conference champion; ^ – NCAA Division III playoff participant

2006 Illini–Badger Football Conference standings
	Conf.			Overall
Team	W		L	W		L
Concordia (WI) $^	7	–	0	10	–	1
Greenville	5	–	2	6	–	4
Aurora	5	–	2	5	–	5
Lakeland	5	–	2	5	–	5
Benedictine (IL)	3	–	4	4	–	6
MacMurray	2	–	5	3	–	7
Concordia (IL)	1	–	6	2	–	8
Eureka	0	–	7	0	–	10
$ – Conference champion; ^ – NCAA Division III playoff participant

2006 Iowa Conference football standings
	Conf.			Overall
Team	W		L	W		L
No. 11 Central (IA) $^	8	–	0	10	–	1
Wartburg	6	–	2	8	–	2
Coe	5	–	3	7	–	3
Dubuque	5	–	3	6	–	4
Buena Vista	4	–	4	4	–	6
Loras	4	–	4	4	–	6
Simpson (IA)	3	–	5	3	–	7
Luther	1	–	7	2	–	8
Cornell (IA)	0	–	8	2	–	8
$ – Conference champion; ^ – NCAA Division III playoff participant; Rankings from D3football.com

2006 Liberty League football standings
	Conf.			Overall
Team	W		L	W		L
No. 20 Hobart +^	5	–	1	8	–	2
No. 25 Union (NY) +^	5	–	1	7	–	3
Rochester (NY)	4	–	2	7	–	4
RPI	3	–	3	7	–	3
St. Lawrence	3	–	3	5	–	4
Merchant Marine	1	–	5	3	–	7
WPI	0	–	6	3	–	6
+ – Conference co-champions; ^ – NCAA Division III playoff participant; Rankings from D3football.com

2006 Michigan Intercollegiate Athletic Association football standings
	Conf.			Overall
Team	W		L	W		L
Hope $^	7	–	0	7	–	4
Alma	5	–	2	6	–	4
Olivet	5	–	2	6	–	4
Adrian	4	–	3	5	–	5
Albion	3	–	4	5	–	5
Kalamazoo	2	–	5	2	–	7
Tri-State #	2	–	5	2	–	8
Wisconsin Lutheran	0	–	7	0	–	10
$ – Conference champion; ^ – NCAA Division III playoff participant; * – Provisional NCAA Division III member

2006 Middle Atlantic Conference football standings
	Conf.			Overall
Team	W		L	W		L
No. 14 Wilkes $^	9	–	0	11	–	1
Delaware Valley	8	–	2	8	–	3
Widener	6	–	3	7	–	4
King's	6	–	3	6	–	5
Lebanon Valley	5	–	4	6	–	4
Lycoming	4	–	5	4	–	5
Moravian	4	–	5	4	–	6
Albright	2	–	7	2	–	8
FDU Florham	2	–	7	2	–	8
Juniata	2	–	7	2	–	8
Susquehanna	2	–	7	2	–	8
$ – Conference champion; ^ – NCAA Division III playoff participant; Rankings from D3football.com

2006 Midwest Conference football standings
	Conf.			Overall
Team	W		L	W		L
St. Norbert $^	9	–	0	10	–	1
Monmouth (IL)	7	–	2	7	–	3
Ripon	7	–	2	7	–	3
Illinois College	6	–	3	6	–	4
Lake Forest	5	–	4	5	–	5
Lawrence	4	–	5	5	–	5
Carroll (WI)	4	–	5	4	–	6
Grinnell	2	–	7	2	–	8
Knox	1	–	8	2	–	8
Beloit	0	–	9	1	–	9
$ – Conference champion; ^ – NCAA Division III playoff participant

2006 Minnesota Intercollegiate Athletic Conference football standings
	Conf.			Overall
Team	W		L	W		L
No. 5 Saint John's (MN) +^	7	–	1	11	–	2
No. 17 Bethel (MN) +^	7	–	1	9	–	2
St. Olaf	6	–	2	8	–	2
St. Thomas (MN)	5	–	3	6	–	4
Gustavus Adolphus	4	–	4	6	–	4
Concordia–Moorhead	3	–	5	4	–	6
Carleton	2	–	6	4	–	6
Hamline	1	–	7	3	–	7
Augsburg	1	–	7	1	–	9
+ – Conference co-champions; ^ – NCAA Division III playoff participant; Rankings from D3football.com

2006 New England Football Conference standings
	Conf.			Overall
Team	W		L	W		L
Bogan Division
Coast Guard xy	7	–	0	8	–	3
Bridgewater State	6	–	1	8	–	2
Maine Maritime	5	–	2	6	–	3
Fitchburg State	3	–	4	4	–	5
Worcester State	3	–	4	4	–	6
Massachusetts Maritime	2	–	5	3	–	6
Framingham State	1	–	6	1	–	8
Westfield State	1	–	6	1	–	8
Boyd Division
Curry xy$^	7	–	0	11	–	1
Endicott	5	–	2	6	–	4
Nichols	4	–	3	5	–	4
UMass Dartmouth	4	–	3	5	–	4
Plymouth State	4	–	3	4	–	5
Western New England	3	–	4	5	–	4
MIT	1	–	6	2	–	7
Salve Regina	0	–	7	1	–	8
Championship: Curry 34, Coast Guard 28
$ – Conference champion; x – Division champion/co-champions; y – Championship game participant; ^ – NCAA Division III playoff participant

2006 New England Small College Athletic Conference football standings
	Conf.			Overall
Team	W		L	W		L
Williams $	8	–	0	8	–	0
Trinity (CT)	7	–	1	7	–	1
Middlebury	6	–	2	6	–	2
Amherst	5	–	3	5	–	3
Tufts	4	–	4	4	–	4
Wesleyan	3	–	5	3	–	5
Bowdoin	2	–	6	2	–	6
Colby	2	–	6	2	–	6
Hamilton	2	–	6	2	–	6
Bates	1	–	7	1	–	7
$ – Conference champion

2006 New Jersey Athletic Conference football standings
	Conf.			Overall
Team	W		L	W		L
No. 21 Cortland +	6	–	1	9	–	2
No. 12 Rowan +^	6	–	1	9	–	3
Montclair State	5	–	2	7	–	3
Kean	4	–	3	7	–	4
Western Connecticut	2	–	5	5	–	5
TCNJ	2	–	5	4	–	6
Buffalo State	2	–	5	3	–	7
William Paterson	1	–	6	1	–	9
+ – Conference co-champions; ^ – NCAA Division III playoff participant; Rankings from D3football.com

2006 North Coast Athletic Conference football standings
	Conf.			Overall
Team	W		L	W		L
Wabash +	6	–	1	8	–	2
Wittenberg +^	6	–	1	7	–	4
Wooster	5	–	2	8	–	2
Allegheny	4	–	3	6	–	4
Oberlin	4	–	3	5	–	5
Kenyon	3	–	4	4	–	6
Denison	3	–	4	3	–	7
Ohio Wesleyan	3	–	4	3	–	7
Earlham	1	–	6	3	–	7
Hiram	0	–	7	0	–	10
+ – Conference co-champions; ^ – NCAA Division III playoff participant

2006 Northwest Conference football standings
	Conf.			Overall
Team	W		L	W		L
No. 9 Whitworth $^	6	–	0	11	–	1
No. 23 Linfield	5	–	1	6	–	3
Pacific Lutheran	4	–	2	4	–	5
Puget Sound	3	–	3	7	–	3
Willamette	2	–	4	2	–	7
Menlo	1	–	5	4	–	6
Lewis & Clark	0	–	6	0	–	9
$ – Conference champion; ^ – NCAA Division III playoff participant; Rankings from D3football.com

2006 Ohio Athletic Conference football standings
	Conf.			Overall
Team	W		L	W		L
No. 1 Mount Union $^	9	–	0	15	–	0
No. 3 Capital ^	8	–	1	11	–	2
Baldwin–Wallace	6	–	3	7	–	3
Marietta	5	–	4	6	–	4
Ohio Northern	5	–	4	6	–	4
John Carroll	5	–	4	5	–	5
Otterbein	3	–	6	4	–	6
Wilmington (OH)	3	–	6	3	–	7
Muskingum	1	–	8	2	–	8
Heidelberg	0	–	9	0	–	10
$ – Conference champion; ^ – NCAA Division III playoff participant; Rankings from D3football.com

2006 Old Dominion Athletic Conference football standings
	Conf.			Overall
Team	W		L	W		L
Washington and Lee $^	5	–	1	7	–	4
Bridgewater	4	–	2	8	–	2
Emory & Henry	4	–	2	6	–	4
Hampden–Sydney	4	–	2	4	–	6
Guilford	3	–	3	6	–	4
Catholic University	1	–	5	3	–	7
Randolph–Macon	0	–	6	2	–	8
$ – Conference champion; ^ – NCAA Division III playoff participant

2006 Presidents' Athletic Conference football standings
	Conf.			Overall
Team	W		L	W		L
No. 18 Washington & Jefferson $^	6	–	0	10	–	2
Waynesburg	5	–	1	6	–	4
Thiel	4	–	2	5	–	5
Thomas More	2	–	4	6	–	4
Bethany (WV)	2	–	4	4	–	6
Grove City	1	–	5	3	–	7
Westminster (PA)	1	–	5	2	–	8
$ – Conference champion; ^ – NCAA Division III playoff participant; Rankings from D3football.com

2006 Southern California Intercollegiate Athletic Conference football standings
	Conf.			Overall
Team	W		L	W		L
No. 15 Occidental $^	6	–	0	9	–	1
Redlands	4	–	2	4	–	5
Cal Lutheran	3	–	3	6	–	3
La Verne	3	–	3	3	–	6
Claremont–Mudd–Scripps	2	–	4	4	–	5
Pomona–Pitzer	2	–	4	3	–	6
Whittier	1	–	5	2	–	7
$ – Conference champion; ^ – NCAA Division III playoff participant; Rankings from D3football.com

2006 Southern Collegiate Athletic Conference football standings
	Conf.			Overall
Team	W		L	W		L
Millsaps $^	6	–	0	7	–	4
Trinity (TX)	5	–	1	8	–	2
DePauw	3	–	3	6	–	4
Rhodes	3	–	3	6	–	4
Centre	2	–	4	5	–	5
Austin	2	–	4	4	–	6
Sewanee	0	–	6	2	–	8
$ – Conference champion; ^ – NCAA Division III playoff participant

2006 University Athletic Association football standings
	Conf.			Overall
Team	W		L	W		L
No. 22 Carnegie Mellon $^	3	–	0	11	–	1
Washington University	2	–	1	6	–	4
Case Western Reserve	1	–	2	5	–	5
Chicago	0	–	3	4	–	5
$ – Conference champion; ^ – Division III playoff participant; Rankings from D3football.com

2006 Upper Midwest Athletic Conference football standings
	Conf.			Overall
Team	W		L	W		L
North
Minnesota–Morris xy$#	7	–	0	7	–	3
Northwestern (MN) #	6	–	1	7	–	3
Crown #	2	–	5	3	–	6
Trinity Bible §	2	–	5	2	–	6
Martin Luther	2	–	5	2	–	8
South
Rockford xy	5	–	2	7	–	3
Maranatha Baptist	4	–	3	6	–	3
Westminster (MO)	4	–	3	4	–	5
Blackburn	3	–	4	3	–	7
Principia	0	–	7	0	–	9
Championship: Minnesota–Morris 27, Rockford 20
$ – Conference champion; x – Division champion/co-champions; y – Championship game participant; # – Provisional NCAA Division III member § – Not an NCAA member

2006 USA South Athletic Conference football standings
	Conf.			Overall
Team	W		L	W		L
No. 24 Christopher Newport +^	6	–	1	8	–	3
Averett +	6	–	1	7	–	3
North Carolina Wesleyan	5	–	2	6	–	4
Maryville (TN)	4	–	3	5	–	5
Methodist	2	–	5	4	–	6
Greensboro	2	–	5	3	–	7
Ferrum	2	–	5	2	–	7
Shenandoah	1	–	6	2	–	8
+ – Conference co-champions; ^ – NCAA Division III playoff participant; Rankings from D3football.com

2006 Wisconsin Intercollegiate Athletic Conference football standings
	Conf.			Overall
Team	W		L	W		L
No. 2 Wisconsin–Whitewater $^	7	–	0	14	–	1
No. 6 Wisconsin–La Crosse ^	6	–	1	9	–	2
Wisconsin–Stevens Point	4	–	3	6	–	4
Wisconsin–Oshkosh	3	–	4	5	–	5
Wisconsin–Platteville	3	–	4	5	–	5
Wisconsin–Eau Claire	2	–	5	3	–	7
Wisconsin–River Falls	2	–	5	3	–	7
Wisconsin–Stout	1	–	6	3	–	7
$ – Conference champion; ^ – NCAA Division III playoff participant; Rankings from D3football.com

2006 NCAA Division III independents football records
	Conf.			Overall
Team	W		L	W		L
Huntingdon		–		6	–	4
Husson		–		6	–	4
Mount Ida		–		5	–	4
Colorado College		–		5	–	5
Chapman		–		4	–	5
Macalester		–		2	–	7
SUNY Maritime		–		1	–	6
Morrisville State #		–		1	–	8
Becker		–		0	–	9
LaGrange		–		0	–	10
# – Provisional Division III member

== Conference champions ==
Conference champions
- American Southwest Conference – Mary Hardin–Baylor
- Atlantic Central Football Conference – Wesley
- Centennial Conference – Dickinson
- College Conference of Illinois and Wisconsin – Augustana (IL), North Central (IL), and Wheaton (IL)
- Empire 8 Conference – St. John Fisher and Springfield
- Heartland Collegiate Athletic Conference – Mount St. Joseph
- Illini-Badger Football Conference – Concordia (WI)
- Iowa Intercollegiate Athletic Conference – Central (IA)
- Liberty League – Hobart and Union (NY)
- Michigan Intercollegiate Athletic Association – Hope
- Middle Atlantic Conference – Wilkes
- Midwest Conference – St. Norbert
- Minnesota Intercollegiate Athletic Conference – Bethel (MN) and Saint John's (MN)
- New England Football Conference – Coast Guard (Bogan Division), Curry (Boyd Division)
  - Championship Game: Curry 34, Coast Guard 28
- New England Small College Athletic Conference – Williams
- New Jersey Athletic Conference – Rowan and SUNY Cortland
- North Coast Athletic Conference – Wabash and Wittenberg
- Northwest Conference – Whitworth
- Ohio Athletic Conference – Mount Union
- Old Dominion Athletic Conference – Washington & Lee
- Presidents' Athletic Conference – Washington & Jefferson
- Southern California Intercollegiate Athletic Conference – Occidental
- Southern Collegiate Athletic Conference – Millsaps
- University Athletic Association – Carnegie Mellon
- Upper Midwest Athletic Conference – Minnesota–Morris
- USA South Athletic Conference – Averett and Christopher Newport
- Wisconsin Intercollegiate Athletic Conference – Wisconsin–Whitewater

== Postseason ==
The 2006 NCAA Division III Football Championship playoffs were the 34th annual single-elimination tournament to determine the national champion of men's NCAA Division III college football. The championship Stagg Bowl game was held at Salem Football Stadium in Salem, Virginia for the 14th time.

=== Qualification ===
Twenty-one conferences met the requirements for an automatic ("Pool A") bid to the playoffs. Besides the NESCAC, which does not participate in the playoffs, five conferences had no Pool A bid. The NWC was in the first year and the PAC in the second year of the two-year waiting period, while the ACFC, UAA, and UMAC failed to meet the seven-member requirement.

Schools not in Pool A conferences were eligible for Pool B. The number of Pool B bids was determined by calculating the ratio of Pool A conferences to schools in those conferences and applying that ratio to the number of Pool B schools. The 21 Pool A conferences contained 181 schools, an average of 8.6 teams per conference. Thirty-seven schools were in Pool B, enough for four bids.

The remaining seven playoff spots were at-large ("Pool C") teams.

=== Playoff bracket ===
First Round; Campus Sites
Mount Union	49
Hope	0
Wheaton (IL)	42
Mount St. Joseph	28
North Central (IL)	35
Concordia Wisconsin	6
Capital	32
Wittenberg	14
Wilkes	42
Washington & Lee	0
Rowan	20
Hobart	18
St. John Fisher	49
Union (NY)	21
Springfield	42
Curry	14
Wesley	49
Dickinson	21
Carnegie Mellon	21
Millsaps	0
Washington & Jefferson	27
Christopher Newport	23
Mary Hardin–Baylor	33
Hardin–Simmons	21
Wisconsin–Whitewater	59
St. Norbert	17
Wisconsin–La Crosse	28
Bethel (MN)	21
Whitworth	27
Occidental	23
Saint John's (MN)	21
Central (IA)	13

Second Round; Campus Sites
Mount Union	35
Wheaton (IL)	3
North Central (IL)	13
Capital	41
Wilkes	14
Rowan	21
St. John Fisher	27
Springfield	21
Wesley	37
Carnegie Mellon	0
Washington & Jefferson	27
Mary Hardin–Baylor	30
Wisconsin–Whitewater	24
Wisconsin–La Crosse	21
Whitworth	3
Saint John's (MN)	21

Quarterfinals; Campus Sites
Mount Union	17
Capital	14
Rowan	0
St. John Fisher	31
Wesley	34
Mary Hardin–Baylor	28
Wisconsin–Whitewater	17
Saint John's (MN)	14

Semifinals; Campus Sites
Mount Union	26
St. John Fisher	14
Wesley	7
Wisconsin–Whitewater	44

National Championship Game; Salem Football Stadium; Salem, Virginia
Mount Union	35
Wisconsin–Whitewater	16

* Overtime

== See also ==
- 2006 NCAA Division I FBS football season
- 2006 NCAA Division I FCS football season
- 2006 NCAA Division II football season
