= Matt Kelchner =

American football coach

Biographical details
- Born: March 5, 1959 (age 67); Harrisburg, Pennsylvania

Coaching career (HC unless noted)
- 1982: Mansfield (assistant)
- 1983: Dickinson (assistant)
- 1984–2000: William & Mary (assistant)
- 2001–2016: Christopher Newport

Head coaching record
- Overall: 109–61
- Tournaments: 3–10 (NCAA D-III playoffs)

Accomplishments and honors

Championships
- 10 Dixie/USAC (2001–2004, 2006, 2008, 2010–2012, 2014)

Awards
- 7× Dixie/USAC Coach of the Year (2001–2002, 2006, 2008, 2010–2011, 2014)

Matt Kelchner (born March 5, 1959) is an American former football coach. He served as the head football coach at Christopher Newport University in Newport News, Virginia from 2001 to 2016. Kelchner was hired as Christopher Newport's first head coach on May 9, 2000.

In 16 seasons at Christopher Newport, Kelchner compiled an overall record of 109–61. He won nearly 80% of his conference games, 78 of those wins coming in the Dixie Conference, later termed the USA South Athletic Conference, and 32% of non-conference games.

He guided the Captains to the NCAA Division III playoffs ten times, posting a 3–10 record. He was named Dixie Conference/USA South Conference Coach of the Year seven times. Under Kelcher's direction, CNU was nationally ranked four times in his 16 seasons.

After missing the NCAA playoffs three times in four seasons and not matching his earlier success in the New Jersey Athletic Conference, Kelchner relinquished his role in 2016 as the longest-reigning head coach of the Christopher Newport program at the age of 57, and moved into an administration role in the university's athletic department.

Kelchner spent his entire collegiate coaching career at the NCAA Division III, II and FCS levels. He was an assistant coach at NCAA The College of William & Mary (I-AA/FCS) from 1984 to 2000 with one year stints previously at Mansfield (NCAA Division II) and Dickinson (NCAA Division III).

== Head coaching record ==
Year	Team	Overall	Conference	Standing	Bowl/playoffs	D3^{#}
Christopher Newport Captains (Dixie Conference / USA South Athletic Conference) (2001–2014)
2001	Christopher Newport	5–5	5–1	T–1st	L NCAA Division III First Round	
2002	Christopher Newport	6–5	5–1	T–1st	L NCAA Division III First Round	
2003	Christopher Newport	8–3	5–1	T–1st	L NCAA Division III Second Round	19
2004	Christopher Newport	9–3	5–1	T–1st	L NCAA Division III Second Round	16
2005	Christopher Newport	6–4	5–2	T–3rd		
2006	Christopher Newport	8–3	6–1	T–1st	L NCAA Division III First Round	24
2007	Christopher Newport	7–3	6–1	2nd		
2008	Christopher Newport	8–2	7–0	1st	L NCAA Division III First Round	
2009	Christopher Newport	5–5	4–3	T–3rd		
2010	Christopher Newport	6–5	6–1	T–1st	L NCAA Division III First Round	
2011	Christopher Newport	8–3	7–0	1st	L NCAA Division III First Round	
2012	Christopher Newport	6–5	5–2	T–1st	L NCAA Division III First Round	
2013	Christopher Newport	8–2	5–2	T–3rd		
2014	Christopher Newport	8–4	7–1	1st	L NCAA Division III Second Round	24
Christopher Newport Captains (New Jersey Athletic Conference) (2015–2016)
2015	Christopher Newport	4–6	4–5	T–7th		
2016	Christopher Newport	7–3	6–3	T–3rd		
Christopher Newport:		109–61	88–25			
Total:		109–61				
National championship Conference title Conference division title or championship game berth
^{#}Rankings from D3football.com.
