= Dave Caputi =

American football coach (born c. 1958)

Current position
- Title: Offensive line coach
- Team: Middlebury
- Conference: NESCAC

Biographical details
- Born: c. 1958 (age 67–68)
- Education: Middlebury College (1981); North Adams State College (1994)

Playing career
- 1977–1980: Middlebury
- Position: Quarterback

Coaching career (HC unless noted)
- 1981: Fitchburg HS (MA) (assistant)
- 1982: Amherst (RB/WR)
- 1984: Amherst (RB/WR)
- 1985: Tufts (QB/DB)
- 1986–1998: Williams (OC)
- 1999–2014: Bowdoin
- 2015–2022: Middlebury (OC)
- 2023–present: Middlebury (OL)

Head coaching record
- Overall: 35–93

David C. Caputi (born c. 1958) is an American college football coach. He is the offensive line coach for Middlebury College, a position he has held since 2023 after being the offensive coordinator from 2015 to 2022. He was the head football coach for Bowdoin College from 1999 to 2014, tallying a 35–93 record. He also coached for Fitchburg High School, Amherst, Tufts, and Williams. He played college football for Middlebury as a quarterback.

== Head coaching record ==
Year	Team	Overall	Conference	Standing	Bowl/playoffs
Bowdoin Polar Bears (New England Small College Athletic Conference) (1999–2014)
1999	Bowdoin	0–8	0–8	10th	
2000	Bowdoin	0–8	0–8	10th	
2001	Bowdoin	1–7	1–7	T–8th	
2002	Bowdoin	1–7	1–7	9th	
2003	Bowdoin	0–8	0–8	10th	
2004	Bowdoin	2–6	2–6	T–7th	
2005	Bowdoin	6–2	6–2	T–3rd	
2006	Bowdoin	2–6	2–6	T–7th	
2007	Bowdoin	3–5	3–5	7th	
2008	Bowdoin	4–4	4–4	T–5th	
2009	Bowdoin	3–5	3–5	T–6th	
2010	Bowdoin	3–5	3–5	7th	
2011	Bowdoin	4–4	4–4	T–4th	
2012	Bowdoin	1–7	1–7	T–8th	
2013	Bowdoin	3–5	3–5	7th	
2014	Bowdoin	2–6	2–6	T–7th	
Bowdoin:		35–93	35–93		
Total:		35–93			
