= 2001 NCAA Division III football season =

American college football season

- Regular season: August – November 2001
- Playoffs: November – December 2001
- National championship: Salem Football Stadium; Salem, VA
- Champion: Mount Union (6)
- Gagliardi Trophy: Chuck Moore (RB), Mount Union

The 2001 NCAA Division III football season, part of the college football season organized by the NCAA at the Division III level in the United States, began in August 2001, and concluded with the NCAA Division III Football Championship, also known as the Stagg Bowl, in December 2001 at Salem Football Stadium in Salem, Virginia. The Mount Union Purple Raiders won their sixth, and second consecutive, Division III championship by defeating the Bridgewater (VA) Eagles, 30−27.

The Gagliardi Trophy, given to the most outstanding player in Division III football, was awarded to Chuck Moore, running back from Mount Union.

== Conference and program changes ==
=== Conference changes ===
School	2000 Conference	2001 Conference
Christopher Newport	New program	Dixie

=== Program changes ===
- After Salisbury State University shortened its name to Salisbury University in 2001, the Salisbury State Sea Gulls became the Salisbury Sea Gulls at the start of the 2001 season.

== Conference standings ==
2001 American Southwest Conference football standings
	Conf.			Overall
Team	W		L	W		L
Hardin–Simmons $^	8	–	0	8	–	2
Mary Hardin–Baylor ^	7	–	1	8	–	2
Howard Payne	7	–	2	8	–	2
Mississippi College	6	–	3	7	–	3
East Texas Baptist	4	–	5	5	–	5
Austin	3	–	5	3	–	6
Louisiana College	3	–	6	4	–	6
Sul Ross	3	–	6	3	–	7
Texas Lutheran	2	–	7	2	–	8
McMurry	0	–	8	0	–	9
$ – Conference champion; ^ – NCAA Division III playoff participant

2001 Atlantic Central Football Conference standings
	Conf.			Overall
Team	W		L	W		L
Wesley $	3	–	0	7	–	3
Frostburg State	2	–	1	4	–	5
Salisbury	1	–	2	4	–	6
Apprentice §	0	–	3	2	–	7
$ – Conference champion; § – Not an NCAA member

2001 Centennial Conference football standings
	Conf.			Overall
Team	W		L	W		L
Western Maryland +^	5	–	1	8	–	3
Muhlenberg +	5	–	1	7	–	4
Johns Hopkins	4	–	2	6	–	3
Ursinus	3	–	3	6	–	4
Dickinson	3	–	3	5	–	5
Gettysburg	1	–	5	4	–	6
Franklin & Marshall	0	–	6	1	–	9
+ – Conference co-champions; ^ – NCAA Division III playoff participant

2001 College Conference of Illinois and Wisconsin football standings
	Conf.			Overall
Team	W		L	W		L
Augustana (IL) +^	6	–	1	10	–	2
Illinois Wesleyan +	6	–	1	7	–	2
Millikin	5	–	2	8	–	2
Wheaton (IL)	5	–	2	6	–	4
Carthage	3	–	4	6	–	4
North Central (IL)	2	–	5	3	–	7
Elmhurst	1	–	6	2	–	8
North Park	0	–	7	2	–	8
+ – Conference co-champions; ^ – NCAA Division III playoff participant

2001 Dixie Conference football standings
	Conf.			Overall
Team	W		L	W		L
Ferrum +	5	–	1	6	–	4
Christopher Newport +^	5	–	1	5	–	5
Greensboro	3	–	3	5	–	5
Methodist	3	–	3	5	–	5
Shenandoah	3	–	3	5	–	5
Chowan	2	–	4	2	–	7
Averett	0	–	6	1	–	8
+ – Conference co-champions; ^ – NCAA Division III playoff participant

2001 Freedom Football Conference standings
	Conf.			Overall
Team	W		L	W		L
Western Connecticut +^	5	–	1	8	–	2
Plymouth State +	5	–	1	7	–	3
Merchant Marine	3	–	3	4	–	5
Springfield (MA)	3	–	3	4	–	5
WPI	3	–	3	4	–	6
Norwich	1	–	5	4	–	6
Coast Guard	1	–	5	2	–	7
+ – Conference co-champions; ^ – NCAA Division III playoff participant

2001 Heartland Collegiate Athletic Conference football standings
	Conf.			Overall
Team	W		L	W		L
Anderson (IN) +	5	–	1	8	–	2
Defiance +^	5	–	1	8	–	3
Bluffton	4	–	2	5	–	5
Hanover	4	–	2	5	–	5
Franklin (IN)	2	–	4	3	–	7
Manchester	1	–	5	2	–	8
Mount St. Joseph	0	–	6	0	–	10
+ – Conference co-champions; ^ – NCAA Division III playoff participant

2001 Illini–Badger Football Conference standings
	Conf.			Overall
Team	W		L	W		L
MacMurray $^	7	–	0	9	–	2
Aurora	6	–	1	7	–	2
Concordia (WI)	4	–	3	6	–	4
Benedictine (IL)	4	–	3	4	–	6
Lakeland	3	–	4	4	–	6
Greenville	2	–	5	5	–	5
Concordia (IL)	1	–	6	1	–	9
Eureka	1	–	6	1	–	9
$ – Conference champion; ^ – NCAA Division III playoff participant

2001 Iowa Conference football standings
	Conf.			Overall
Team	W		L	W		L
Central (IA) $^	8	–	1	9	–	2
Wartburg	7	–	2	8	–	2
Cornell (IA)	6	–	3	7	–	3
Coe	6	–	3	6	–	4
Buena Vista	4	–	5	5	–	5
Loras	4	–	5	5	–	5
Simpson (IA)	4	–	5	4	–	6
Upper Iowa	3	–	6	3	–	7
Luther	2	–	7	3	–	7
Dubuque	1	–	8	2	–	8
$ – Conference champion; ^ – NCAA Division III playoff participant

2001 Michigan Intercollegiate Athletic Association football standings
	Conf.			Overall
Team	W		L	W		L
Albion $	5	–	0	8	–	2
Hope	4	–	1	7	–	2
Alma	3	–	2	6	–	4
Adrian	2	–	3	2	–	8
Kalamazoo	1	–	4	5	–	4
Olivet	0	–	5	1	–	9
$ – Conference champion

2001 Middle Atlantic Conference football standings
	Conf.			Overall
Team	W		L	W		L
Widener $^	10	–	0	12	–	1
Lycoming	8	–	1	8	–	1
King's (PA)	7	–	2	7	–	3
Albright	5	–	4	6	–	4
Juniata	4	–	5	5	–	5
Susquehanna	4	–	5	4	–	6
Wilkes	4	–	5	4	–	6
Moravian	3	–	5	4	–	5
Delaware Valley	2	–	7	3	–	7
Fairleigh Dickinson–Florham	1	–	7	1	–	8
Lebanon Valley	1	–	8	1	–	9
$ – Conference champion; ^ – NCAA Division III playoff participant

2001 Midwest Conference football standings
	Conf.			Overall
Team	W		L	W		L
Ripon +	7	–	1	8	–	2
St. Norbert +^	8	–	1	9	–	1
Monmouth (IL)	6	–	2	8	–	2
Grinnell	5	–	3	5	–	5
Illinois College	4	–	4	6	–	4
Lake Forest	4	–	4	5	–	5
Beloit	2	–	6	3	–	7
Carroll (WI)	2	–	6	2	–	7
Knox	2	–	6	2	–	7
Lawrence	1	–	7	2	–	8
+ – Conference co-champions; ^ – NCAA Division III playoff participant

2001 Minnesota Intercollegiate Athletic Conference football standings
	Conf.			Overall
Team	W		L	W		L
Bethel (MN) +^	8	–	1	9	–	2
Saint John's (MN) +^	8	–	1	11	–	3
St. Thomas (MN)	7	–	2	7	–	3
Gustavus Adolphus	6	–	3	7	–	3
St. Olaf	5	–	4	6	–	4
Concordia–Moorhead	4	–	5	5	–	5
Augsburg	4	–	5	4	–	6
Hamline	2	–	7	2	–	8
Carleton	1	–	8	1	–	9
Macalester	0	–	9	0	–	10
+ – Conference co-champions; ^ – NCAA Division III playoff participant

2001 New England Small College Athletic Conference football standings
	Conf.			Overall
Team	W		L	W		L
Williams $	8	–	0	8	–	0
Amherst	7	–	1	7	–	1
Tufts	6	–	2	6	–	2
Colby	4	–	4	4	–	4
Middlebury	4	–	4	4	–	4
Trinity (CT)	4	–	4	4	–	4
Wesleyan	4	–	4	4	–	4
Bates	1	–	7	1	–	7
Bowdoin	1	–	7	1	–	7
Hamilton	1	–	7	1	–	7
$ – Conference champion

2001 New England Football Conference standings
	Conf.			Overall
Team	W		L	W		L
Bogan Division
Westfield State xy$^	6	–	0	10	–	1
Worcester State	5	–	1	10	–	1
Bridgewater State	3	–	3	5	–	4
Framingham State	2	–	4	2	–	7
Maine Maritime	2	–	4	2	–	7
Massachusetts Maritime	2	–	4	2	–	7
Fitchburg State	1	–	5	2	–	7
Boyd Division
Nichols xy	5	–	0	6	–	4
Curry	4	–	1	9	–	2
UMass Dartmouth	3	–	2	6	–	4
Salve Regina	2	–	3	4	–	4
Western New England	1	–	4	3	–	5
MIT	0	–	5	1	–	8
Championship: Westfield State 12, Nichols 0
$ – Conference champion; x – Division champion/co-champions; y – Championship game participant; ^ – NCAA Division III playoff participant

2001 New Jersey Athletic Conference football standings
	Conf.			Overall
Team	W		L	W		L
Rowan +^	5	–	1	11	–	2
Montclair State +^	5	–	1	9	–	2
TCNJ	4	–	2	6	–	4
Cortland	3	–	3	5	–	5
William Paterson	2	–	4	3	–	7
Kean	1	–	5	2	–	7
New Jersey City	1	–	5	1	–	8
+ – Conference co-champions; ^ – NCAA Division III playoff participant

2001 North Coast Athletic Conference football standings
	Conf.			Overall
Team	W		L	W		L
Wittenberg $^	7	–	0	11	–	2
Ohio Wesleyan	6	–	1	9	–	1
Wabash	6	–	1	8	–	2
Allegheny	4	–	3	5	–	5
Earlham	3	–	4	4	–	6
Wooster	3	–	4	4	–	6
Denison	2	–	5	2	–	8
Oberlin	2	–	5	2	–	8
Hiram	1	–	6	3	–	7
Kenyon	1	–	6	1	–	9
$ – Conference champion; ^ – NCAA Division III playoff participant

2001 Northwest Conference football standings
	Conf.			Overall
Team	W		L	W		L
Linfield +	4	–	1	7	–	2
Whitworth +	4	–	1	7	–	2
Pacific Lutheran +^	4	–	1	8	–	3
Willamette	2	–	3	4	–	5
Lewis & Clark	1	–	4	3	–	6
Puget Sound	0	–	5	0	–	9
+ – Conference co-champions; ^ – NCAA Division III playoff participant

2001 Ohio Athletic Conference football standings
	Conf.			Overall
Team	W		L	W		L
Mount Union $^	9	–	0	14	–	0
Ohio Northern	8	–	1	8	–	2
Capital	6	–	3	7	–	3
John Carroll	6	–	3	7	–	3
Baldwin–Wallace	5	–	4	5	–	5
Wilmington (OH)	4	–	5	5	–	5
Otterbein	3	–	6	4	–	6
Muskingum	2	–	7	3	–	7
Marietta	1	–	8	2	–	8
Heidelberg	1	–	8	1	–	9
$ – Conference champion; ^ – NCAA Division III playoff participant

2001 Old Dominion Athletic Conference football standings
	Conf.			Overall
Team	W		L	W		L
Bridgewater $^	6	–	0	12	–	1
Emory & Henry	3	–	3	5	–	5
Hampden–Sydney	3	–	3	5	–	5
Washington and Lee	3	–	3	5	–	5
Guilford	3	–	3	4	–	6
Randolph–Macon	2	–	4	4	–	6
Catholic University	1	–	5	3	–	7
$ – Conference champion; ^ – NCAA Division III playoff participant

2001 Presidents' Athletic Conference football standings
	Conf.			Overall
Team	W		L	W		L
Washington & Jefferson $^	4	–	0	11	–	1
Bethany (WV)	2	–	2	6	–	3
Waynesburg	2	–	2	3	–	7
Grove City	1	–	3	2	–	8
Thiel	1	–	3	2	–	8
Westminster (PA) *	0	–	0	4	–	5
$ – Conference champion; ^ – NCAA Division III playoff participant; * Completing reclassification from NCAA Division II—games did not count in conference standings.

2001 Southern California Intercollegiate Athletic Conference football standings
	Conf.			Overall
Team	W		L	W		L
Occidental $	5	–	0	8	–	1
Cal Lutheran	3	–	2	6	–	3
Redlands	3	–	2	5	–	3
Claremont-Mudd-Scripps	2	–	3	5	–	3
Whittier	2	–	3	2	–	7
La Verne	0	–	5	1	–	8
$ – Conference champion

2001 Southern Collegiate Athletic Conference football standings
	Conf.			Overall
Team	W		L	W		L
Trinity (TX) $^	6	–	0	9	–	2
Centre	5	–	1	9	–	1
DePauw	4	–	2	5	–	5
Millsaps	3	–	3	6	–	4
Sewanee	2	–	4	5	–	5
Rhodes	1	–	5	5	–	5
Rose–Hulman	0	–	6	2	–	8
$ – Conference champion; ^ – NCAA Division III playoff participant

2001 Upstate Collegiate Athletic Association football standings
	Conf.			Overall
Team	W		L	W		L
RPI $	4	–	0	8	–	1
Union (NY)	3	–	1	9	–	2
Hobart	2	–	2	6	–	3
Rochester (NY)	1	–	3	3	–	7
St. Lawrence	0	–	4	0	–	10
$ – Conference champion

2001 Wisconsin Intercollegiate Athletic Conference football standings
	Conf.			Overall
Team	W		L	W		L
Wisconsin–Eau Claire +	5	–	2	8	–	2
Wisconsin–Stevens Point +^	5	–	2	8	–	3
Wisconsin–Stout	4	–	3	6	–	3
Wisconsin–River Falls	4	–	3	4	–	5
Wisconsin–La Crosse	3	–	4	4	–	6
Wisconsin–Platteville	3	–	4	4	–	6
Wisconsin–Whitewater	2	–	5	5	–	5
Wisconsin–Oshkosh	2	–	5	3	–	6
+ – Conference co-champions; ^ – NCAA Division III playoff participant

2001 NCAA Division III independents football records
	Conf.			Overall
Team	W		L	W		L
Thomas More ^		–		11	–	1
Ithaca ^		–		11	–	2
Brockport ^		–		9	–	2
Menlo		–		8	–	2
Hartwick		–		7	–	4
Rockford		–		5	–	4
Alfred		–		4	–	5
Martin Luther		–		4	–	5
Wisconsin Lutheran		–		4	–	5
Chapman		–		3	–	6
Colorado College		–		3	–	6
Maranatha Baptist		–		3	–	6
Principia		–		2	–	4
St. John Fisher		–		3	–	7
Pomona-Pitzer		–		2	–	6
Maryville (TN)		–		2	–	8
Westminster (MO)		–		2	–	8
Buffalo State		–		1	–	8
Mount Ida		–		1	–	8
Utica		–		0	–	8
Blackburn		–		0	–	10
^ – NCAA Division III playoff participant

== Conference champions ==
Conference champions
- American Southwest Conference – Hardin–Simmons
- Atlantic Central Football Conference – Wesley
- Centennial Conference – Western Maryland and Muhlenberg
- College Conference of Illinois and Wisconsin – Augustana (IL) and Illinois Wesleyan
- Dixie Intercollegiate Football Conference – Christopher Newport and Ferrum
- Freedom Football Conference – Plymouth State and Western Connecticut State
- Heartland Collegiate Athletic Conference – Anderson and Defiance
- Illini-Badger Football Conference – MacMurray
- Iowa Intercollegiate Athletic Conference – Central (IA)
- Michigan Intercollegiate Athletic Association – Albion
- Middle Atlantic Conference – Widener
- Midwest Conference – Ripon and St. Norbert
- Minnesota Intercollegiate Athletic Conference – Bethel (MN) and Saint John's (MN)
- New England Football Conference – Westfield State (Bogan Division), Nichols (Boyd Division)
  - Championship Game: Westfield State 12, Nichols 0
- New England Small College Athletic Conference – Williams
- New Jersey Athletic Conference – Rowan
- North Coast Athletic Conference – Wittenberg
- Northwest Conference – Linfield, Pacific Lutheran, and Whitworth
- Ohio Athletic Conference – Mount Union
- Old Dominion Athletic Conference – Bridgewater
- Presidents' Athletic Conference – Washington & Jefferson
- Southern California Intercollegiate Athletic Conference – Occidental
- Southern Collegiate Athletic Conference – Trinity (TX)
- University Athletic Association – Washington–Saint Louis
- Upper Midwest Athletic Conference – Northwestern–St. Paul
- Upstate Collegiate Athletic Conference – RPI
- Wisconsin Intercollegiate Athletic Conference – Wisconsin–Eau Claire and Wisconsin–Stevens Point

== Postseason ==
The 2001 NCAA Division III Football Championship playoffs were the 29th annual single-elimination tournament to determine the national champion of men's NCAA Division III college football. The championship Stagg Bowl game was held at Salem Football Stadium in Salem, Virginia for the ninth time. This was the third bracket to feature 28 teams since last expanding in 1999.

=== Playoff bracket ===
First Round; Campus Sites
Augustana (IL)	54
Defiance	14
Wittenberg	38*
Hardin–Simmons	35
Thomas More	34
MacMurray	30
Pacific Lutheran	27*
Whitworth	26
Saint John's (MN)	27
St. Norbert	20
UW–Stevens Point	37
Bethel (MN)	27
Ithaca	35
Montclair State	23
Rowan	40
Brockport	17
West. Conn. State	8
Westfield State	7
Trinity (TX)	30
Mary Hardin–Baylor	6
Widener	56
Christopher Newport	7
Wash. & Jefferson	24
Western Maryland	21

Second Round; Campus Sites
Mount Union	32
Augustana (IL)	7
Wittenberg	41
Thomas More	0
Central (IA)	21
Pacific Lutheran	27*
Saint John's (MN)	9
UW–Stevens Point	7
RPI	10
Ithaca	27
Rowan	43
West. Conn. State	14
Bridgewater (VA)	41
Trinity (TX)	37
Widener	46
Wash. & Jefferson	30

Quarterfinals; Campus Sites
Mount Union	49
Wittenberg	21
Pacific Lutheran	6
Saint John's (MN)	31
Ithaca	0
Rowan	48
Bridgewater (VA)	57
Widener	32

Semifinals; Campus Sites
Mount Union	35
Saint John's (MN)	14
Rowan	24
Bridgewater (VA)	29

National Championship Game; Salem Football Stadium; Salem, Virginia
Mount Union	30
Bridgewater (VA)	27

* Overtime

== See also ==
- 2001 NCAA Division I-A football season
- 2001 NCAA Division I-AA football season
- 2001 NCAA Division II football season
