= Art Link (American football) =

American football coach (born 1976)

Current position
- Title: Assistant head coach & safeties coach
- Team: Delaware
- Conference: CUSA

Biographical details
- Born: July 2, 1976 (age 50); Long Island, New York, U.S.

Playing career
- 1995–1998: Florida
- Position: Linebacker

Coaching career (HC unless noted)
- 1999–2002: Missouri Western (LB)
- 2003: Boca Raton HS (FL) (DL)
- 2004–2005: Florida (GA)
- 2006: Catholic University (DC/DB)
- 2007–2011: Campbell (DC/LB)
- 2012–2013: New Hampshire (LB)
- 2014–2016: Lafayette (DC/LB)
- 2017–2021: Christopher Newport
- 2022–2023: Delaware (ST/S)
- 2024–present: Delaware (AHC/S)

Head coaching record
- Overall: 19–22

Accomplishments and honors

Championships
- National (1996)

Otto Arthur Link IV (born July 2, 1976) is an American college football coach. He is currently the assistant head coach and safeties coach for the University of Delaware, positions he has held since 2024. He previously served as the head football coach at Christopher Newport University in Newport News, Virginia from 2017 to 2021, compiling a record of 19–22. Prior to coming to Christopher Newport, Link was a defensive coordinator at Lafayette College in Easton, Pennsylvania from 2014 to 2016.

As a college player at the University of Florida, Link was a linebacker on Florida's 1996 national championship team.

== Head coaching record ==
Year	Team	Overall	Conference	Standing	Bowl/playoffs
Christopher Newport Captains (New Jersey Athletic Conference) (2017–2021)
2017	Christopher Newport	5–5	4–5	T–5th	
2018	Christopher Newport	7–2	6–2	4th	
2019	Christopher Newport	2–8	2–5	T–5th	
2020–21	Christopher Newport	0–2	0–2	6th	
2021	Christopher Newport	5–5	3–3	3rd	
Christopher Newport:		19–22	15–17		
Total:		19–22			
