= Weston Field Athletic Complex =

Athletic complex in Massachusetts

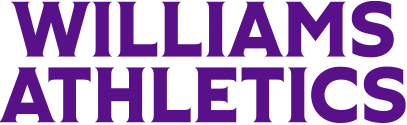

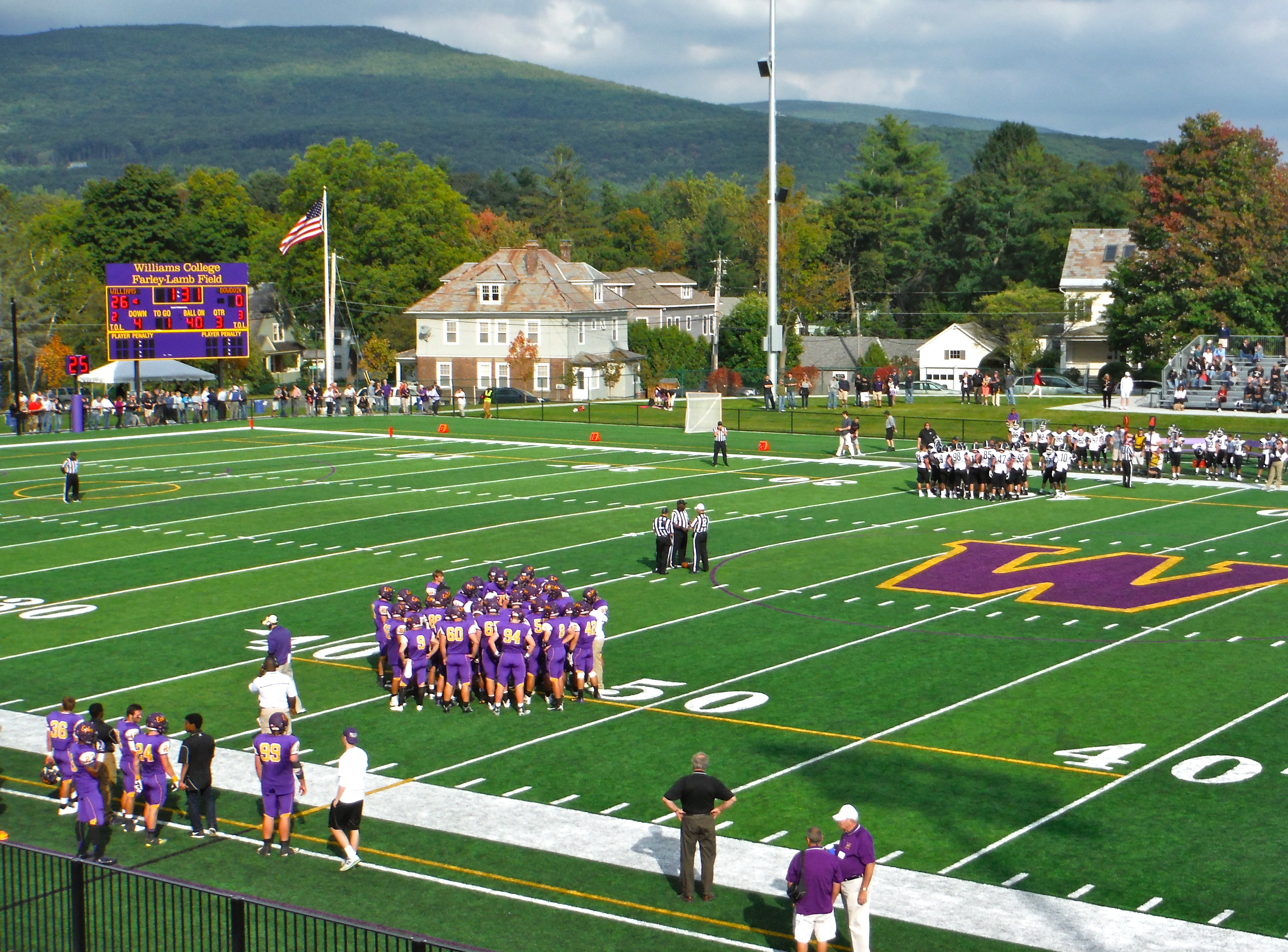
- The football stadium in 2014
- Interactive map of Weston Field Athletic Complex
- Address: Williamstown, MA; United States
- Owner: Williams College
- Operator: Williams College Athletics
- Type: Sports complex
- Current use: Football; Field Hockey; Lacrosse; Track and field

Construction
- Opened: 1886; 140 years ago
- Renovated: 2014

Tenants
- Williams Ephs (NCAA) teams: football (1886–present); lacrosse (2005–present); field hockey (2004–present); track and field (1901–present); baseball (1886–2004)

Website
- ephsports.williams.edu/weston

Weston Field Athletic Complex is a sports complex in Williamstown, Massachusetts, United States. The facility is owned and operated by Williams College and home of the Williams Ephs athletics teams. The complex consists of two separate turf fields, Farley-Lamb Field for football and lacrosse, and Williamson Field for field hockey as well as track and field.

Renovations completed in 2014 include artificial turf surfaces, a new grandstand, an addition for field hockey, a new track, lighting for the fields and a large support building. Weston Field biennially hosts the Williams-Amherst football game, known as The Biggest Little Game in America, the most-played Division III football rivalry game and the only Division III game to have hosted College GameDay.

Baseball venue, Bobby Coombs Field, was part of the Weston Field Complex from 1886 to 2004, when it was relocated to the northern end of the campus.

== History ==
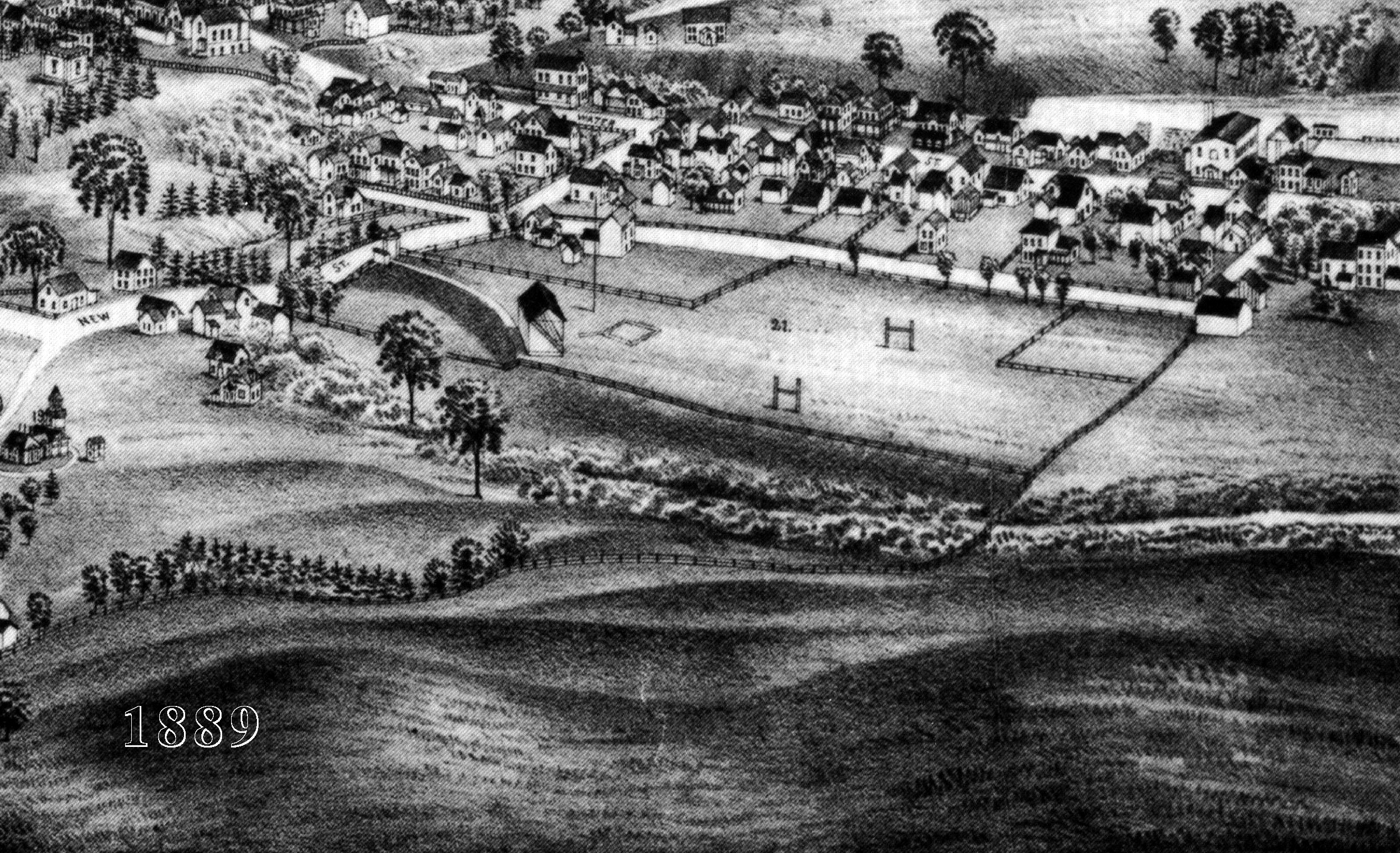
Weston Field in 1899

In 1884, Williams College purchased the land at the present-day athletic site from the Sherman family on Meacham Street. In 1886, ex-Lieutenant Governor of Massachusetts Byron Weston donated $5,300 to the College. This money was used to grade and improve drainage of the complex. By 1893, Weston Field encompassed 13 acres that included facilities for baseball and football. Subsequently, Weston contributed another $2,500 to help fund the creation of an athletic cinder track and the construction of a grandstand that was completed in 1901.

Although maintenance upgrades and improvements occurred during the next several decades, a major renovation of Weston Field didn't occur until the late 1980s, when the Anthony Plansky Track, funded by George Steinbrenner, was completed (1987) along with a three-story press box and aluminum bleachers on the east side of the field. The Renzi Lamb Field for lacrosse and intramural sports, completed in 2004, was the first artificial turf facility in Berkshire County.

=== 2014 Renovations ===
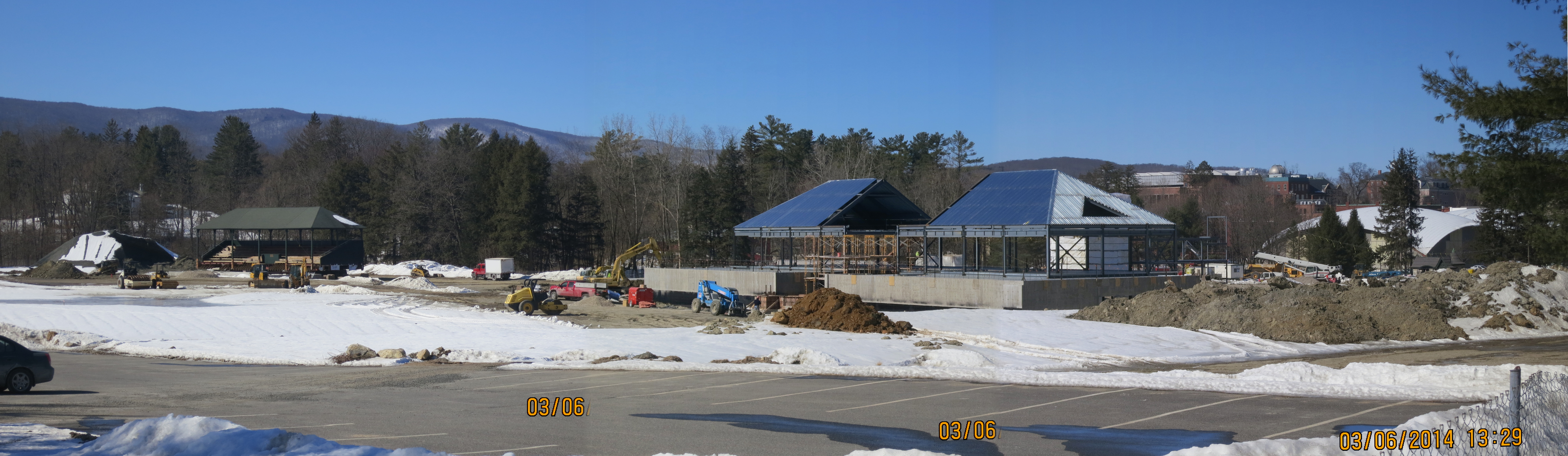
The complex under renovations in March 2014

On October 15, 2012, Williams College President Adam Falk announced a $22 million renovation project with new facilities for football, field hockey, men's and women's lacrosse, and men's and women's track. Construction began immediately after the 2013 Williams-Amherst football game and was completed in time for the 2014 football season.

The new Complex includes artificial turf with expanded lighting on the playing fields, which allows four-season athletic practice.

== Facilities ==
Sports venues at Weston Athletic Complex include:

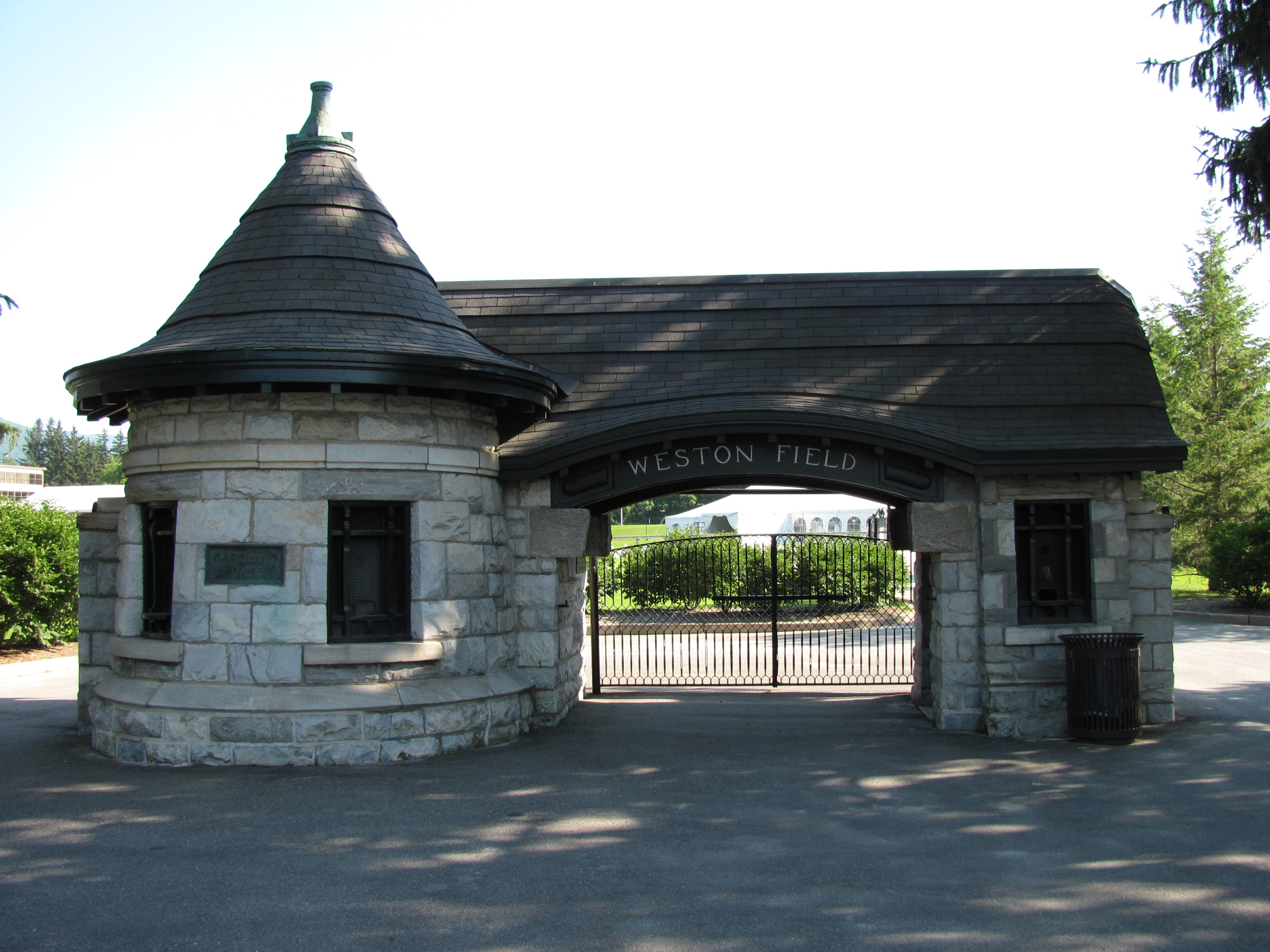
Weston Field gate

| Facility | Sport(s) |
|---|---|
| Farley-Lamb Field | Football |
| Farley-Lamb Field | Lacrosse |
| Williamson Field | Field hockey |
| Williamson Field | Track and field (Note: Athletics track is named "Lee Track", encircling the Williamson Field.) |

== Geology ==
Weston Field is adjacent to Christmas Brook that drains more than 640 acres of higher ground located to the southwest of downtown Williamstown. The field's location proximity to Christmas Brook and its associated wetlands has made it susceptible to recurrent drainage problems. A thick, impervious layer of clay beneath Weston Field keeps the groundwater close to the surface during any wet period. The field of thick sod was susceptible to intermittent muddy conditions. Former Williams College football coach, Dick Farley, reflecting on Weston's history recalled a memorable game in 1995. The Williams versus Amherst game, televised by ESPN, was played in a quagmire; neither side was able to achieve significant yardage resulting in a 0–0 tie.

An engineering study submitted to the Williamstown Conservation Commission details the various soils present and hydrology issues that are associated with Weston Field. These problems will be rectified during the current renovation.
