= Wesleyan Cardinals football =

Football team of Wesleyan University

- First season: 1875; 151 years ago
- Athletic director: Mike Whalen
- Head coach: Dan DiCenzo; 10th season, 56–23 (.709)
- Location: Middletown, Connecticut
- Stadium: Andrus Field
- Conference: NESCAC
- Colors: Cardinal and black

Conference championships
- 8
- Mascot: Cardinals
- Website: wesleyan.edu/football

The Wesleyan Cardinals football team represents Wesleyan University in the sport of American football. It is a member of the Division III New England Small College Athletic Conference (NESCAC) and competes against traditional Little Three rivals Amherst and Williams.

Wesleyan is one of the 39 founding members of the NCAA. The Cardinals' home field, Andrus Field, is the oldest continuously used American football field in the world. Andrus Field is also the oldest continuously used baseball field in the world as the Wesleyan baseball team also uses Andrus Field.

== NESCAC championships ==
2013*, 2024, 2025*, 2026*

*Shared championship

== Postseason appearances ==
=== NCAA Division III playoffs ===
The Cardinals will make their first appearance in the NCAA Division III playoffs in 2026, the first year of NESCAC participation.

Year	Round	Opponent	Result
2026	Second Round	Springfield	TBP

== Little Three titles ==
1913, 1918, 1927, 1933, 1939, 1946, 1947, 1948, 1955, 1966, 1969, 1970, 2013, 2016, 2019, 2022, 2023, 2024, 2025

== Notable players ==
- Bill Belichick: former head coach of the New England Patriots of the National Football League (NFL)
- Eric Mangini: former head coach of the NFL's New York Jets and Cleveland Browns and NFL analyst for ESPN and Fox Sports 1
- Jeff Wilner: first Wesleyan graduate to play for an NFL team; played tight end for the Green Bay Packers and Denver Broncos from 1994 to 1996
- Field Yates: analyst on ESPN and former member of the coaching staff of the Kansas City Chiefs
