= Williams Ephs football =

College football team in Massachusetts, US

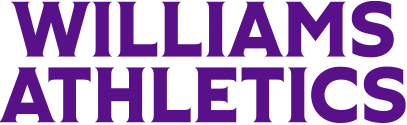
- First season: 1881; 145 years ago
- Athletic director: Lisa Melendy
- Head coach: Mark Raymond; 9th season, 37–33 (.529)
- Location: Williamstown, Massachusetts
- Stadium: Weston Field
- NCAA division: Division III
- Conference: NESCAC
- Colors: Purple and gold
- Rivalries: Amherst (rivalry)
- Website: ephsports.williams.edu/football

The Williams Ephs football program represents Williams College, located in Williamstown, Massachusetts, in the sport of college football. The football team is coached by Mark Raymond, who has held the position since the start of the 2016 season. The team plays at Weston Field on campus. The team has had 16 players named to the Division III All-America Team since 1974. The program began varsity play in 1881. As a NESCAC football team, the program is not permitted to play non-conference games or to participate in the NCAA Tournament.

The team's annual rivalry game against Amherst is known as The Biggest Little Game in America. It is traditionally the final game of each season. The 2007 game between Williams and Amherst, won by Williams 20–0, hosted College GameDay at Weston Field. As of the end of the 2013 season, Williams leads the all-time series 71–52–5.

== Honors ==
The team has won the following honors:

- Little Three (since 1990): 1990, 1991, 1992, 1993, 1994, 1996, 1998, 2001, 2003, 2005, 2006, 2007, 2008, 2010, 2021 (outright); 1995, 1997, 1999, 2017 (ties)
- NESCAC Championships (since 2000): 2001, 2006, 2010, 2021 (outright); 2002 (tie)
- Perfect seasons (8-0): 1989, 1990, 1994, 1998, 2001, 2006, 2010, 2021
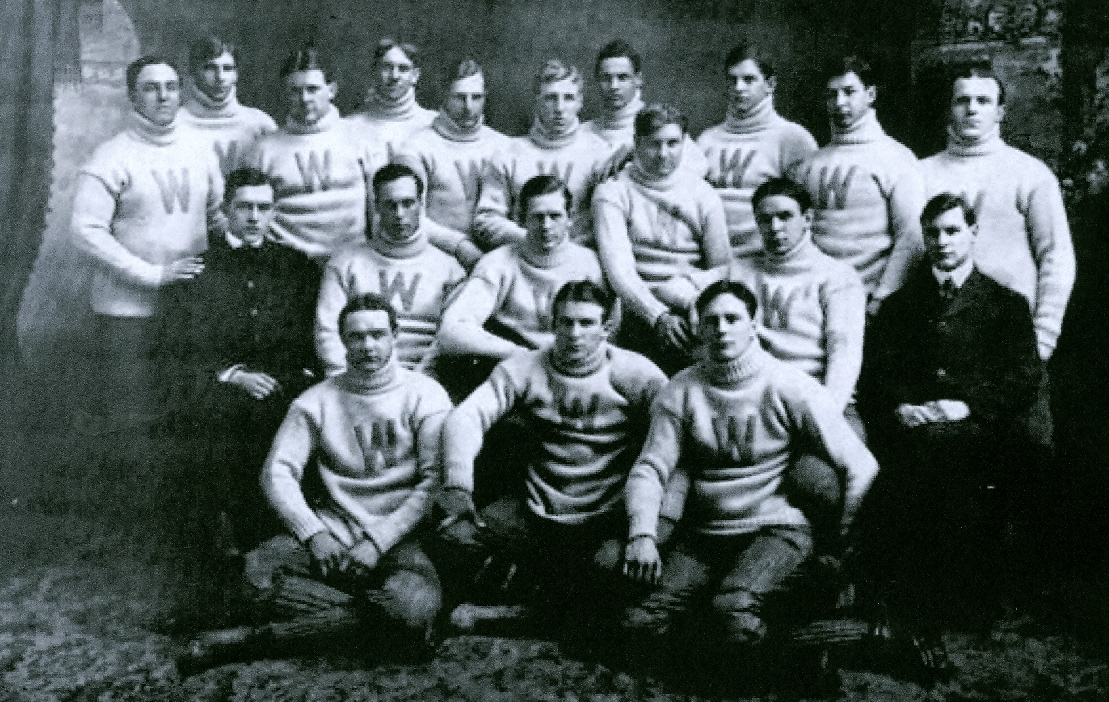
1901 Williams team

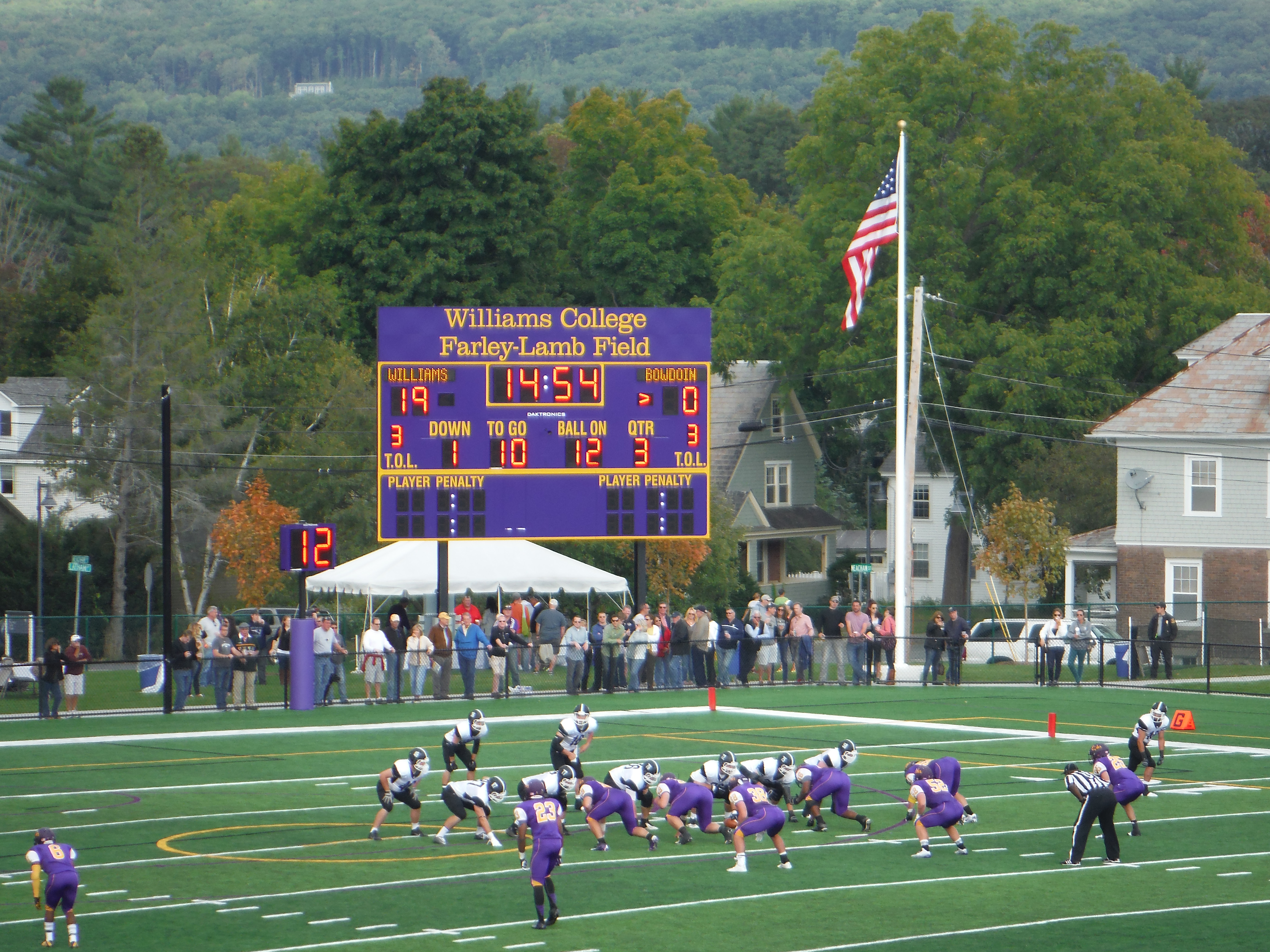
Williams game at Lamb Field in 2014
