= 2026 NCAA Division III men's basketball tournament =

American collegiate basketball tournament

- Teams: 64
- Finals site: Championship game: Gainbridge Fieldhouse, Indianapolis, Indiana; Quarterfinals and semifinals: Allen County War Memorial Coliseum, Fort Wayne, Indiana
- Champions: Mary Washington (1st title)
- Runner-up: Emory (1st title game)
- Semifinalists: Christopher Newport (4th Final Four); Trinity (CT) (4th Final Four)
- Winning coach: Marcus Kahn (1st title)
- MOP: Kye Robinson (Mary Washington)

The 2026 NCAA Division III men's basketball tournament was a single-elimination tournament to determine the national champion of men's NCAA Division III college basketball in the United States, the culmination of the 2025–26 NCAA Division III men's basketball season.

The tournament again featured 64 teams, with teams placed into one of four 16-team regionals. The first three rounds were played on campus sites, followed by the quarterfinal and semifinal rounds at the Allen County War Memorial Coliseum in Fort Wayne, Indiana from March 19–21, 2026. The national championship game was played at Gainbridge Fieldhouse in Indianapolis, Indiana on April 5, 2026, as part of a joint championship weekend alongside the Division II and NIT championships, the first such arrangement since 2020.

Mary Washington won their first national championship, defeating Emory 75–73 on a buzzer-beater from Colin Mitchell. Mary Washington were the eighth consecutive first-time national champion, a streak dating back to Babson in 2017. Three teams made their NCAA Division III tournament debut: Belhaven, Keuka, and Mississippi University for Women.

== Tournament schedule and venues ==
2026 first- and second-round host sites

First and second rounds

First- and second-round games were played at campus sites on March 6 and March 7.

On the basis of team strength and geography, these locations were chosen to host first- and second-round games in the 2026 tournament:

- Ray Oosting Gymnasium, Hartford, Connecticut (Host: Trinity College)
- Woodsboro Bank Arena, Frederick, Maryland (Host: Hood College)
- Silloway Gymnasium, Middletown, Connecticut (Host: Wesleyan University)
- Cousens Gymnasium, Medford, Massachusetts (Host: Tufts University)
- Ron Rosner Arena, Fredericksburg, Virginia (Host: University of Mary Washington)
- Mitchell Hall, La Crosse, Wisconsin (Host: University of Wisconsin–La Crosse)
- Ratner Athletics Center, Chicago, Illinois (Host: University of Chicago)
- Gus Young Court, St. Peter, Minnesota (Host: Gustavus Adolphus College)
- Woodruff Physical Education Center, Atlanta, Georgia (Host: Emory University)
- Panzer Athletic Center, Montclair, New Jersey (Host: Montclair State University)
- MacDonald Gymnasium, Beverly, Massachusetts (Host: Endicott College)
- Shirk Center, Bloomington, Illinois (Host: Illinois Wesleyan University)
- Jerabeck Activity and Athletic Center, Houston, Texas (Host: University of St. Thomas)
- Washington University Field House, St. Louis, Missouri (Note: The venue has a St. Louis mailing address but is in unincorporated St. Louis County.) (Host: Washington University in St. Louis)
- Crenshaw Gymnasium, Ashland, Virginia (Host: Randolph–Macon College)
- Freeman Center, Newport News, Virginia (Host: Christopher Newport University)

== Qualifying teams ==
A total of sixty-four bids will be available for the tournament: 43 automatic bids—awarded to the champions of the forty-three NCAA-recognized Division III conference tournaments—and 21 at-large bids.

=== Automatic bids (43) ===
The following 43 teams were automatic qualifiers for the 2026 NCAA field by virtue of winning their conference's automatic bid (except for the UAA, whose regular-season champion received the automatic bid).

Automatic bids
Conference	Team	Record (Conf.)	Appearance	Last bid
Allegheny Mountain	Penn State Behrend	20–7 (14–2)	9th	2019
American Rivers	Loras	20–8 (12–4)	5th	2024
American Southwest	Mary Hardin–Baylor	20–7 (5–1)	9th	2023
Atlantic East	Neumann	19–9 (8–6)	5th	2025
Centennial	Gettysburg	18–9 (11–2)	7th	2025
CUNYAC	Lehman	21–6 (14–0)	2nd	2004
Coast to Coast	Mary Washington	24–3 (5–1)	5th	2025
CCIW	Illinois Wesleyan	23–4 (13–3)	28th	2025
CCS	Belhaven	16–12 (7–5)	1st	Never
CNE	Endicott	26–1 (16–0)	9th	2017
Empire 8	Keuka	15–13 (9–7)	1st	Never
Great Northeast	St. Joseph's (ME)	20–8 (12–0)	4th	2025
Heartland	Transylvania	20–8 (14–4)	11th	2020
Landmark	Susquehanna	16–12 (9–9)	10th	2022
Liberty	Vassar	20–8 (13–5)	2nd	2022
Little East	Western Connecticut	21–6 (12–4)	14th	2020
MAC Commonwealth	Hood	24–3 (13–1)	4th	2024
MAC Freedom	Stevens	18–9 (10–4)	6th	2024
MASCAC	Worcester State	15–12 (11–3)	5th	2024
Michigan	Hope	18–9 (11–3)	31st	2024
Midwest	Grinnell	22–3 (15–1)	4th	2025
Minnesota	Gustavus Adolphus	25–2 (15–1)	15th	2024
NESCAC	Trinity (CT)	25–2 (8–2)	12th	2025
NEWMAC	Babson	21–6 (13–3)	14th	2024
New Jersey	TCNJ	21–6 (14–4)	10th	2025
North Atlantic	Maine–Farmington	22–5 (17–1)	2nd	2010
North Coast	John Carroll	22–6 (11–5)	19th	2025
Northern Athletics	Aurora	23–5 (15–3)	12th	2019
Northwest	Whitworth	22–5 (14–2)	18th	2024
Ohio	Heidelberg	16–12 (7–9)	5th	2022
Old Dominion	Roanoke	22–6 (12–4)	15th	2025
Presidents'	Washington & Jefferson	22–6 (12–4)	4th	2022
Skyline	Yeshiva	20–8 (16–0)	5th	2025
Southern	Rhodes	23–4 (12–2)	5th	2017
SCIAC	Redlands	23–4 (13–3)	5th	2025
SCAC	St. Thomas (TX)	26–1 (16–0)	4th	2025
SLIAC	MUW	17–10 (11–5)	1st	Never
SUNYAC	SUNY Cortland	23–4 (17–1)	8th	2025
United East	Penn State Harrisburg	18–10 (10–3)	4th	2024
UAA	Emory	22–3 (12–2)	13th	2025
Upper Midwest	Bethany Lutheran	16–11 (7–5)	6th	2025
USA South	North Carolina Wesleyan	21–6 (11–3)	7th	2023
Wisconsin	UW–La Crosse	22–6 (9–5)	5th	2025

=== At-large bids (21) ===
The following 21 teams were awarded qualification for the tournament field by the NCAA's NPI rankings, a computer ranking system that evaluates teams' winning percentage, strength of schedule, home-away bonus, quality wins, and overtime results.

At-large bids
Conference	Team	Record (Conf.)	Appearance	Last bid
NESCAC	Amherst	18–7 (7–3)	21st	2019
NESCAC	Bates	18–8 (5–5)	2nd	2015
Landmark	Catholic	19–7 (15–3)	17th	2025
UAA	Chicago	21–4 (11–3)	8th	2025
Coast to Coast	Christopher Newport	21–5 (4–1)	29th	2025
SCIAC	Claremont–Mudd–Scripps	22–4 (13–3)	17th	2025
Centennial	Franklin & Marshall	22–5 (10–3)	27th	2025
Centennial	Johns Hopkins	20–7 (10–3)	15th	2023
New Jersey	Montclair State	25–2 (17–1)	9th	2025
Ohio	Mount Union	23–3 (14–2)	6th	2023
UAA	NYU	17–8 (8–6)	14th	2025
Ohio	Otterbein	22–5 (13–3)	14th	2002
Old Dominion	Randolph–Macon	25–3 (14–2)	22nd	2025
Southern	Trinity (TX)	21–6 (12–2)	13th	2024
NESCAC	Tufts	20–5 (8–2)	10th	2025
Wisconsin	UW–Platteville	18–9 (9–5)	17th	2025
Wisconsin	UW–Stevens Point	19–7 (9–5)	16th	2018
Wisconsin	UW–Whitewater	20–7 (10–4)	23rd	2023
UAA	Washington–St. Louis	18–7 (8–6)	27th	2025
NESCAC	Wesleyan (CT)	21–6 (9–1)	6th	2025
NEWMAC	WPI	21–5 (14–2)	16th	2025

== Tournament bracket ==
=== Top-left ===
First round March 6, 2026; Campus Sites
Trinity (CT)	74
Keuka	63
Hartford, CT
Babson	71
St. Joseph's (ME)	67
Hood	84
Vassar	71
Frederick, MD
Redlands	96
Susquehanna	71
Wesleyan (CT)	76
Lehman	66
Middletown, CT
NYU	65
Gettysburg	53
Tufts	65
Penn State Harrisburg	60
Medford, MA
Catholic	71
Western Connecticut	69

Second round March 7, 2026; Campus Sites
Trinity (CT)	71
Babson	61
Hood	114
Redlands	104
Wesleyan (CT)	84
NYU	69
Tufts	74
Catholic	60

Sectional semifinals March 13/14, 2026
Trinity (CT)	88
Hood	71
Wesleyan (CT)	61
Tufts	75

Sectional finals March 19, 2026
Trinity (CT)	69
Tufts	66

=== Bottom-left ===
First round March 6, 2026; Campus Sites
Mary Washington	86
Worcester State	55
Fredericksburg, VA
WPI	46
Amherst	63
UW–La Crosse	75
Hope	61
La Crosse, WI
Claremont–Mudd–Scripps	84
Aurora	60
Chicago	72
Penn State Behrend	48
Chicago, IL
UW–Platteville	52
Otterbein	57
Gustavus Adolphus	86
Bethany Lutheran	70
St. Peter, MN
UW–Stevens Point	76
Mary Hardin–Baylor	84

Second round March 7, 2026; Campus Sites
Mary Washington	81
Amherst	64
UW–La Crosse	79
Claremont–Mudd–Scripps	62
Chicago	81
Otterbein	66
Gustavus Adolphus	90
Mary Hardin–Baylor	72

Sectional semifinals March 13/14, 2026
Mary Washington	73
UW–La Crosse	68
Chicago	93
Gustavus Adolphus	92

Sectional finals March 19, 2026
Mary Washington	81
Chicago	73

=== Top-right ===
First round March 6, 2026; Campus Sites
Emory	87
MUW	73
Atlanta, GA
Roanoke	88
Rhodes	84
Montclair State	84
Maine–Farmington	96
Montclair, NJ
Bates	69
Yeshiva	71
Endicott	96
Neumann	82
Beverly, MA
Franklin & Marshall	66
SUNY Cortland	75
Illinois Wesleyan	62
Heidelberg	51
Bloomington, IL
John Carroll	118
Grinnell	86

Second round March 7, 2026; Campus Sites
Emory	83*
Roanoke	81
Maine–Farmington	69
Yeshiva	92
Endicott	58
SUNY Cortland	57
Illinois Wesleyan	73
John Carroll	60

Sectional semifinals March 13/14, 2026
Emory	101
Yeshiva	80
Endicott	77
Illinois Wesleyan	83

Sectional finals March 19, 2026
Emory	83
Illinois Wesleyan	78

=== Bottom-right ===
First round March 6, 2026; Campus Sites
St. Thomas (TX)	69*
Belhaven	63
Houston, TX
Trinity (TX)	71
Whitworth	63
Washington–St. Louis	82
Transylvania	47
St. Louis, MO
UW–Whitewater	85
Loras	76
Randolph–Macon	76
North Carolina Wesleyan	52
Ashland, VA
TCNJ	74
Johns Hopkins	73
Christopher Newport	75
Stevens	62
Newport News, VA
Mount Union	77
Washington & Jefferson	82

Second round March 7, 2026; Campus Sites
St. Thomas (TX)	75
Trinity (TX)	58
Washington–St. Louis	74
UW–Whitewater	71
Randolph–Macon	68
TCNJ	45
Christopher Newport	90
Washington & Jefferson	61

Sectional semifinals March 13/14, 2026
St. Thomas (TX)	65
Washington–St. Louis	63
Randolph–Macon	57
Christopher Newport	59

Sectional finals March 19, 2026
St. Thomas (TX)	59
Christopher Newport	63

=== Final Four ===
National semifinals March 21; Fort Wayne, IN
Trinity (CT)	61
Mary Washington	64
Emory	72
Christopher Newport	58

National championship April 5 Indianapolis, IN
Mary Washington	75
Emory	73

== See also ==
- 2026 NCAA Division I men's basketball tournament
- 2026 NCAA Division II men's basketball tournament
- 2026 NAIA men's basketball tournament
- 2026 NCAA Division III women's basketball tournament
