= Mike Rhoades =

American basketball coach (born 1972)

Current position
- Title: Head coach
- Team: Penn State
- Conference: Big Ten
- Record: 49–53 (.480)
- Annual salary: $2,900,000

Biographical details
- Born: September 21, 1972 (age 54)

Playing career
- 1991–1995: Lebanon Valley

Coaching career (HC unless noted)
- 1996–1999: Randolph–Macon (assistant)
- 1999–2009: Randolph–Macon
- 2009–2014: VCU (associate HC)
- 2014–2017: Rice
- 2017–2023: VCU
- 2023–present: Penn State

Head coaching record
- Overall: 422–242 (.636)
- Tournaments: 0–3 (NCAA Division I); 3–4 (NCAA Division III); 1–1 (NIT); 1–1 (CBI)

Accomplishments and honors

Championships
- 4 ODAC regular season (2002–2005); ODAC tournament (2003); 2 Atlantic 10 regular season (2019, 2023); Atlantic 10 tournament (2023)

Awards
- Atlantic 10 Coach of the Year (2019)

Michael David Rhoades (born September 21, 1972) is an American basketball coach. He is the head men's basketball coach at Penn State University, where he was hired on March 29, 2023. Prior to his position at Penn State, Rhoades served as the head men's basketball coach at Randolph–Macon College from 1999 to 2009, at Rice University from 2014 to 2017, and at Virginia Commonwealth University from 2017 to 2023.

== Biography ==
=== Playing career ===
Rhoades played college basketball at Lebanon Valley College and led the team to the 1994 Division III national championship. A shooting guard, he still holds the records for assists, steals, and free-throw percentage. He also graduated as the college's all-time leading scorer. Rhoades was an All-American twice, the 1995 Division III national player of the year, and his #5 jersey is retired at LVC.

=== Coaching career ===
After a playing career at Lebanon Valley under Pat Flannery, Rhoades accepted his first coaching job at Randolph-Macon in 1996, under Hal Nunnally. Upon Nunnally's retirement in 1999, Rhoades was promoted to head coach at just 25 years old. He would go 197–76 in 10 seasons, reaching four NCAA Division III Tournaments and two Sweet Sixteens.

In 2009, Rhoades accepted a spot as the associate head coach at VCU . While on the Rams' staff Rhoades was a part of Final Four squad during the 2010-11 season, and part of four-straight NCAA tournament teams. VCU's record was 137-46 during this period. The Rams also won the 2010 College Basketball Invitational championship, and the 2012 CAA conference tournament championship.

On March 25, 2014, Rhoades was named the head coach at Rice University, replacing Ben Braun. He engineered a turnaround of the Rice program. Rice went 12-49 the two prior seasons to Rhoades' arrival. Rhoades led Rice to an immediate five win improvement from the prior season during his first year at the helm. Rice went 23–12 in Rhoades' third year. This was Rice's first 20 win season since 2003–04, and the 23 wins are the second-most in program history. Rhoades also led Rice to the second round of the CBI which was the program's first post season appearance since 2011–12.

On March 21, 2017, Rhoades was named the 12th head coach in program history, at VCU. During his 5 seasons at VCU, his overall records was 94–50 (0.653) and his conference record was 50–28 (.641). He coached the VCU Rams to the NCAA Tournament in 2017, 2019, 2021, and 2023.

On March 29, 2023, Rhoades was named the head men's basketball coach at Penn State University, the 15th head coach in program history. His contract was valued at $25.9 million over the course of 7 years. Along with his base pay the contract contains $1.075 million in incentives per year for various achievements ranging from 10 to 150 thousand dollars each. Furthermore the contract also allows for a stipend of a private vehicle, use of private aircraft, ticket allowance and a relocation allowance.

=== Family ===
Rhoades is the son of former Pennsylvania State Senator James J. Rhoades.

== Head coaching record ==
Record table
Season	Team	Overall	Conference	Standing	Postseason
Randolph–Macon Yellow Jackets (Old Dominion Athletic Conference) (1999–2009)
1999–00	Randolph–Macon	13–12	10–8	4th	
2000–01	Randolph–Macon	16–10	12–6	4th	
2001–02	Randolph–Macon	24–6	16–2	1st	NCAA Division III Sweet 16
2002–03	Randolph–Macon	28–3	17–1	1st	NCAA Division III Sweet 16
2003–04	Randolph–Macon	23–5	16–2	1st	NCAA Division III second round
2004–05	Randolph–Macon	17–10	13–5	1st	
2005–06	Randolph–Macon	22–7	15–3	2nd	NCAA Division III first round
2006–07	Randolph–Macon	14–12	9–9	6th	
2007–08	Randolph–Macon	20–6	14–4	3rd	
2008–09	Randolph–Macon	20–6	14–2	2nd	
Randolph–Macon:		197–76 (.722)	136–42 (.764)		
Rice Owls (Conference USA) (2014–2017)
2014–15	Rice	12–20	8–10	T–7th	
2015–16	Rice	12–20	7–11	T–9th	
2016–17	Rice	23–12	11–7	5th	CBI quarterfinal
Rice:		47–52 (.475)	26–28 (.481)		
VCU Rams (Atlantic 10 Conference) (2017–2023)
2017–18	VCU	18–15	9–9	T–5th	
2018–19	VCU	25–8	16–2	1st	NCAA Division I Round of 64
2019–20	VCU	18–13	8–10	T–8th	
2020–21	VCU	19–7	10–4	2nd	NCAA Division I Round of 64
2021–22	VCU	22–10	14–4	T–2nd	NIT second round
2022–23	VCU	27–8	15–3	1st	NCAA Division I Round of 64
VCU:		129–61 (.679)	72–32 (.692)		
Penn State Nittany Lions (Big Ten Conference) (2023–present)
2023–24	Penn State	16–17	9–11	T–9th	
2024–25	Penn State	16–15	6–14	17th	
2025–26	Penn State	12–20	3–17	18th	
2026–27	Penn State	5–1	0–0		
Penn State:		49–53 (.480)	18–42 (.300)		
Total:		422–242 (.636)			
National champion Postseason invitational champion Conference regular season champion Conference regular season and conference tournament champion Division regular season champion Division regular season and conference tournament champion Conference tournament champion
