= NCAA Division III men's basketball tournament =

Tournament to determine the NCAA Division III national champion

- Current season, competition or edition: 2026 NCAA Division III men's basketball tournament
- Sport: Basketball
- Founded: 1975; 51 years ago
- No. of teams: 64
- Country: NCAA Division III (USA)
- Most recent champions: Mary Washington (2026; 1st title)
- Most titles: North Park (5 titles)
- Broadcaster: ESPN+
- Website: NCAA.com

The NCAA Division III men's basketball tournament (officially styled as "Championship" instead of "Tournament") is a tournament to determine the NCAA Division III national champion. It has been held annually from 1975 to 2019 & since 2022, but not played in 2020 and 2021 due to COVID-19 issues.

From 1996 to 2012 and 2014 to 2018, the NCAA Division III men's basketball championship was held at the Salem Civic Center in Salem, Virginia. The event had been hosted by the Old Dominion Athletic Conference and the City of Salem. From 2017 to 2020 & since 2022, the tournament has been a 64-team single-elimination tournament, with teams advancing from four sectionals to the semifinals and final in Fort Wayne.

For 2013, as part of the celebration of the 75th NCAA Division I tournament, the championship games in both the NCAA Division II and Division III tournaments were played at Philips Arena, now known as State Farm Arena, in Atlanta. From 2014 to 2018, the final game returned to Salem. Currently, the Final Four is held in Fort Wayne, Indiana at Allen County War Memorial Coliseum. For 2020 only, the national semifinals were to be played in Fort Wayne, but the championship game was to have returned to Atlanta, with the NCAA choosing to hold the championship games of both Divisions II and III as part of the festivities surrounding the men's Division I Final Four; however, the NCAA decided to abandon the tournament after the second round, 16 teams remaining. The NCAA also canceled the 2021 tournament after a majority of D-III conferences chose not to play due to continued COVID-19 issues. Of teams and conferences that played, D3Hoops' top two ranked teams, No. 1 Randolph–Macon College and No. 2 Trine University, opted to play a self-organised mythical national championship game. Randolph-Macon won, 69–55.

Mary Washington is the defending national champion, beating Emory 75–73 in the 2026 championship.

== Qualification ==
Since 2024–25, a total of 64 bids have been available for each tournament:

- 43 automatic bids, awarded to the champions of all Division III conferences.
- 21 at-large bids.

=== Conference tournaments ===
Schools in italics are, as of the current 2025–26 basketball season, no longer members of that specific conference.

NCAA Division III men's conference tournaments
Conference	Tournament	Most titles	Current champion (2026)
Allegheny Mountain	Tournament	Penn State Behrend (7)	Penn State Behrend (7th)
American Rivers	Tournament	Buena Vista (7)	Loras (4th)
American Southwest	Tournament	Mississippi College (5); UT Dallas (5)	Mary Hardin–Baylor (4th)
Atlantic East	Tournament	Neumann (3)	Neumann (3rd)
Centennial	Tournament	Franklin & Marshall (9)	Gettysburg (4th)
CUNYAC	Tournament	Staten Island (15)	Lehman (6th)
Coast to Coast (C2C)	Tournament	Catholic (7)	Mary Washington (4th)
CCIW	Tournament	Augustana (6)	Illinois Wesleyan (3rd)
CCS	Tournament	Maryville (TN) (2)	Belhaven (1st)
CNE	Tournament	Endicott (8)	Endicott (8th)
Empire 8	Tournament	St. John Fisher (8)	Keuka (1st)
Great Northeast	Tournament	Albertus Magnus (9)	St. Joseph's (ME) (3rd)
Heartland	Tournament	Franklin (7)	Transylvania (5th)
Landmark	Tournament	Scranton (8)	Susquehanna (3rd)
Liberty	Tournament	Skidmore (5)	Vassar (2nd)
Little East	Tournament	UMass Dartmouth (12)	Western Connecticut (7th)
MASCAC	Tournament	Salem State (18)	Worcester State (4th)
Michigan	Tournament	Hope (16)	Hope (16th)
MAC Commonwealth	Tournaments	Scranton (16)	Hood (2nd)
MAC Freedom	Tournaments	Scranton (16)	Stevens (4th)
Midwest	Tournament	Ripon (8)	Grinnell (4th)
Minnesota	Tournament	St. Thomas (MN) (9)	Gustavus Adolphus (11th)
NESCAC	Tournament	Amherst (8)	Trinity (CT) (4th)
NEWMAC	Tournament	Babson (6); MIT (6)	Babson (7th)
NJAC	Tournament	Stockton (6)	TCNJ (3rd)
North Atlantic	Championship	Husson (10)	Maine–Farmington (2nd)
NCAC	Tournament	Wooster (16)	John Carroll (1st)
NACC	Tournament	Aurora (7)	Aurora (7th)
Northwest	Tournament	Whitworth (17)	Whitworth (17th)
Ohio	Tournament	Wittenberg (14)	Heidelberg (2nd)
ODAC	Tournament	Hampden–Sydney (11); Roanoke (11)	Roanoke (11th)
Presidents	Tournament	Bethany (6)	Washington & Jefferson (2nd)
SLIAC	Tournament	Fontbonne (7)	MUW (1st)
Skyline	Tournament	Farmingdale State (7)	Yeshiva (5th)
SAA	Tournament	Berry (5)	Rhodes (3rd)
SCIAC	Tournament	Claremont–Mudd–Scripps (8)	Redlands (3rd)
SCAC	Tournament	Trinity (TX) (6)	St. Thomas (TX) (4th)
SUNYAC	Tournament	Buffalo State (15)	Cortland (5th)
United East	Championship	Morrisville State (5)	Penn State Harrisburg (4th)
UAA	No tournament		
UMAC	Tournament	Northwestern–St. Paul (13)	Bethany Lutheran (6th)
USA South	Tournament	Christopher Newport (15)	North Carolina Wesleyan (6th)
WIAC	Tournament	Wisconsin–Stevens Point (9)	Wisconsin–La Crosse (1st)

==== Defunct conferences ====
Defunct NCAA Division III men's conference tournaments
Conference	Tournament	First year	Last year	Most titles
Colonial States	Tournament	1994	2023	Cabrini (13)
NECC	Tournament	2009	2023	Elms and Mitchell (4)

== Summary ==
NCAA Division III Men's Basketball Championship
Year	Finals Site	Championship Game			Semifinalists	Tournament MOP (University)
Year	Finals Site	Winner	Score	Runner-up	Semifinalists	Tournament MOP (University)
1975	Reading, Pennsylvania	LeMoyne–Owen	57–54	Glassboro State	Augustana (IL); Brockport	Bob Newman (LeMoyne–Owen)
1976	Reading, Pennsylvania	Scranton	60–57 (OT)	Wittenberg	Augustana (IL); Plattsburgh State	Jack Maher (Scranton)
1977	Rock Island, Illinois	Wittenberg	79–66	Oneonta State	Scranton; Hamline	Rick White (Wittenberg)
1978	Rock Island, Illinois	North Park	69–57	Widener	Albion; Stony Brook	Michael Harper (North Park)
1979	Rock Island, Illinois	North Park (2)	66–62	SUNY Potsdam	Franklin & Marshall; Centre	Michael Harper (North Park)
1980	Rock Island, Illinois	North Park (3)	83–76	Upsala	Wittenberg; Longwood	Michael Thomas (North Park)
1981	Rock Island, Illinois	Potsdam State	67–65 (OT)	Augustana (IL)	Ursinus; Otterbein	Maxwell Artis (Augustana (IL))
1982	Grand Rapids, Michigan	Wabash	83–62	Potsdam State	Brooklyn; Stanislaus State	Pete Metzelaars (Wabash)
1983	Grand Rapids, Michigan	Scranton (2)	64–63	Wittenberg	Roanoke; Wisconsin–Whitewater	Bill Bessoir (Scranton)
1984	Grand Rapids, Michigan	Wisconsin–Whitewater	103–86	Clark (MA)	DePauw; Upsala	Andre McKoy (Wisconsin–Whitewater)
1985	Grand Rapids, Michigan	North Park (4)	72–71	Potsdam State	Nebraska Wesleyan; Widener	Earnest Hubbard (North Park)
1986	Grand Rapids, Michigan	Potsdam State (2)	76–73	LeMoyne–Owen	Nebraska Wesleyan; New Jersey City	Roosevelt Bullock (Potsdam State)
1987	Grand Rapids, Michigan	North Park (5)	106–100	Clark (MA)	Wittenberg; Richard Stockton	Michael Starks (North Park)
1988	Grand Rapids, Michigan	Ohio Wesleyan	92–70	Scranton	Nebraska Wesleyan; Hartwick	Scott Tedder (Ohio Wesleyan)
1989	Springfield, Ohio	Wisconsin–Whitewater (2)	94–86	Trenton State	Southern Maine; Centre	Greg Grant (Trenton State)
1990	Springfield, Ohio	Rochester	43–42	DePauw	Washington College; Calvin	Chris Fite (Rochester)
1991	Springfield, Ohio	Wisconsin–Platteville	81–74	Franklin & Marshall	Otterbein; Ramapo	Shawn Frison (Wisconsin–Platteville)
1992	Springfield, Ohio	Calvin	62–49	Rochester	Wisconsin–Platteville; New Jersey City	Steve Honderd (Calvin)
1993	Buffalo, New York	Ohio Northern	71–68	Augustana (IL)	Rowan; UMass Dartmouth	Kirk Anderson (Augustana (IL))
1994	Buffalo, New York	Lebanon Valley	66–59 (OT)	NYU	Wittenberg; St. Thomas (MN)	Mike Rhoades / Adam Crawford (Lebanon Valley / NYU)
1995	Buffalo, New York	Wisconsin–Platteville (2)	69–55	Manchester (IN)	Rowan; Trinity (CT)	Ernie Peavy (Wisconsin–Platteville)
1996	Salem, Virginia	Rowan	100–93	Hope	Illinois Wesleyan; Franklin & Marshall	Terrence Stewart (Rowan)
1997	Salem, Virginia	Illinois Wesleyan	89–86	Nebraska Wesleyan	Williams; Alvernia	Bryan Crabtree (Illinois Wesleyan)
1998	Salem, Virginia	Wisconsin–Platteville (3)	69–56	Hope	Williams; Wilkes	Ben Hoffmann (Wisconsin–Platteville)
1999	Salem, Virginia	Wisconsin–Platteville (4)	76–75 (2OT)	Hampden–Sydney	Connecticut College; William Paterson	Merrill Brunson (Wisconsin–Platteville)
2000	Salem, Virginia	Calvin (2)	79–74	Wisconsin–Eau Claire	Salem State; Franklin & Marshall	Sherm Carstensen (Wisconsin–Eau Claire)
2001	Salem, Virginia	Catholic	76–62	William Paterson	Illinois Wesleyan; Ohio Northern	Pat Maloney (Catholic)
2002	Salem, Virginia	Otterbein	102–83	Elizabethtown	Carthage; Rochester	Jeff Gibbs (Otterbein)
2003	Salem, Virginia	Williams	67–65	Gustavus Adolphus	Wooster; Hampden–Sydney	Benjamin Coffin (Williams)
2004	Salem, Virginia	Wisconsin–Stevens Point	84–82	Williams	John Carroll; Amherst	Nick Bennett (Wisconsin–Stevens Point)
2005	Salem, Virginia	Wisconsin–Stevens Point (2)	73–49	Rochester	Calvin; York (PA)	Jason Kalsow (Wisconsin–Stevens Point)
2006	Salem, Virginia	Virginia Wesleyan	59–56	Wittenberg	Illinois Wesleyan; Amherst	Ton Ton Balenga (Virginia Wesleyan)
2007	Salem, Virginia	Amherst	80–67	Virginia Wesleyan	Washington–St. Louis; Wooster	Andrew Olson (Amherst)
2008	Salem, Virginia	Washington–St. Louis	90–68	Amherst	Hope; Ursinus	Troy Ruths (Washington–St. Louis)
2009	Salem, Virginia	Washington–St. Louis (2)	61–52	Richard Stockton	Guilford; Franklin & Marshall	Sean Wallis (Washington–St. Louis)
2010	Salem, Virginia	Wisconsin–Stevens Point (3)	78–73	Williams	Guilford; Randolph-Macon	Matt Moses (Wisconsin–Stevens Point)
2011	Salem, Virginia	St. Thomas (MN)	78–54	Wooster	Middlebury; Williams	Tyler Nicolai (St. Thomas (MN))
2012	Salem, Virginia	Wisconsin–Whitewater (3)	63–60	Cabrini	Illinois Wesleyan; MIT	Chris Davis (Wisconsin–Whitewater)
2013	Atlanta, Georgia (Note: Only the championship game was played in Atlanta. The semifinals were played at the then-traditional site of the Salem Civic Center in Salem, Virginia.)	Amherst (2)	87–70	Mary Hardin–Baylor	St. Thomas (MN); North Central (IL)	Allen Williamson (Amherst)
2014	Salem, Virginia	Wisconsin–Whitewater (4)	75–73	Williams	Amherst; Illinois Wesleyan	K.J. Evans (Wisconsin–Whitewater)
2015	Salem, Virginia	Wisconsin–Stevens Point (4)	70–54	Augustana (IL)	Babson; Virginia Wesleyan	Austin Ryf (Wisconsin–Stevens Point)
2016	Salem, Virginia	St. Thomas (MN) (2)	82–76	Benedictine	Christopher Newport; Amherst	Taylor Montero (St. Thomas (MN))
2017	Salem, Virginia	Babson	79–78	Augustana (IL)	Whitman; Williams	Joey Flannery (Babson)
2018	Salem, Virginia	Nebraska Wesleyan	78–72	Wisconsin–Oshkosh	Ramapo; Springfield	Cooper Cook (Nebraska Wesleyan)
2019	Fort Wayne, Indiana	Wisconsin–Oshkosh	96–82	Swarthmore	Christopher Newport; Wheaton (IL)	Jack Flynn (Wisconsin–Oshkosh)
2020	Atlanta, Georgia (Note: Only the championship game would have been played in Atlanta. The semifinals would have been played at Allen County War Memorial Coliseum in Fort Wayne, Indiana.)	Abandoned after second round due to the COVID-19 pandemic				
2021	Fort Wayne, Indiana	Not held because insufficient number of Division III schools played a season because of pandemic. A bowl-game style championship was organised by top two teams in D3Sports.com polls Randolph–Macon defeated Trine, 69–55, on campus in Ashland, VA.				
2022	Fort Wayne, Indiana	Randolph–Macon	75–45	Elmhurst	Marietta; Wabash	Buzz Anthony (Randolph–Macon)
2023	Fort Wayne, Indiana	Christopher Newport	74–72	Mount Union	Wisconsin–Whitewater; Swarthmore	Trey Barber (Christopher Newport)
2024	Fort Wayne, Indiana	Trine	69–61	Hampden–Sydney	Guilford; Trinity (CT)	Cortez Garland (Trine)
2025	Fort Wayne, Indiana	Trinity (CT)	64–60	NYU	Wesleyan (CT); Washington–St. Louis	Henry Vetter (Trinity (CT))
2026	Indianapolis, Indiana (Note: Only the championship game was played in Indianapolis. The semifinals were played at the then-traditional site of Allen County War Memorial Coliseum in Fort Wayne, Indiana.)	Mary Washington	75–73	Emory	Christopher Newport; Trinity (CT)	Kye Robinson (Mary Washington)
2027	Pittsburgh, Pennsylvania					
2028	Pittsburgh, Pennsylvania					

== Locations ==
- Reading, Pennsylvania 1975–1976
- Rock Island, Illinois 1977–1981
- Grand Rapids, Michigan 1982–1988
- Springfield, Ohio 1989–1992
- Buffalo, New York 1993–1995
- Salem, Virginia 1996-2018 (semifinals only in 2013)
- Atlanta 2013 (championship game only)
- Fort Wayne, Indiana 2019, 2022–2026 (semifinals only in 2026)
- Indianapolis 2026 (championship game only)
- Pittsburgh 2027–2028

== Championships, by team ==
National championships among active Division III programs: 5, 4, 3, 2, 1

=== Active programs ===
Team	Titles	Years
North Park	5	1978, 1979, 1980, 1985, 1987
Wisconsin–Stevens Point	4	2004, 2005, 2010, 2015
Wisconsin–Whitewater	4	1984, 1989, 2012, 2014
Wisconsin–Platteville	4	1991, 1995, 1998, 1999
Amherst	2	2007, 2013
Calvin	2	1992, 2000
Scranton	2	1976, 1983
SUNY Potsdam	2	1981, 1986
Washington–St. Louis	2	2008, 2009
Mary Washington	1	2026
Trinity (CT)	1	2025
Trine	1	2024
Christopher Newport	1	2023
Randolph–Macon	1	2022
Wisconsin–Oshkosh	1	2019
Nebraska Wesleyan	1	2018
Babson	1	2017
Virginia Wesleyan	1	2006
Williams	1	2003
Otterbein	1	2002
Catholic	1	2001
Illinois Wesleyan	1	1997
Rowan	1	1996
Lebanon Valley	1	1994
Ohio Northern	1	1993
Rochester	1	1990
Ohio Wesleyan	1	1988
Wabash	1	1982
Wittenberg	1	1977

=== Former programs ===
Team	Titles	Years
St. Thomas (MN) (Note: As of 2025–26, this school is a current member of NCAA Division I.)	2	2011, 2016
LeMoyne–Owen (Note: As of 2025–26, this school is a current member of NCAA Division II.)	1	1975

== Programs with at least 20 appearances in the Division III tournament ==
- List below only includes teams that are currently in Division III.

Bids	School	Conference	First Bid	Most Recent
31	Hope	Michigan	1982	2026
30	Wittenberg	North Coast	1975	2020
29	Christopher Newport	Coast to Coast	1986	2026
29	Scranton	Landmark	1975	2023
29	Wooster	North Coast	1978	2020
28	Illinois Wesleyan	CCIW	1984	2026
27	Franklin & Marshall	Centennial	1975	2026
27	Washington–St. Louis	UAA	1987	2026
25	Salem State	MASCAC	1980	2019
24	Calvin	Michigan	1980	2025
23	Wisconsin–Whitewater	Wisconsin	1983	2026
22	Randolph–Macon	Old Dominion	1990	2026
21	Amherst	NESCAC	1994	2026
20	Maryville (TN)	CCS	1991	2019
20	Stockton	NJAC	1987	2025
20	Williams	NESCAC	1994	2024

== See also ==
- NCAA Division III women's basketball tournament
- NCAA Division I men's basketball tournament
- NCAA Division II men's basketball tournament
- NAIA men's basketball tournament
