= Old Dominion Athletic Conference men's basketball tournament =

ODAC men's basketball tournament
- Conference basketball championship
- Sport: Basketball
- Conference: Old Dominion Athletic Conference
- Format: Single-elimination tournament
- Current location: Salem, Virginia
- Played: 1977–present
- Current champion: Roanoke (11th)
- Most championships: Hampden–Sydney (11); Roanoke (11)
- Official website: ODAC men's basketball

The ODAC men's basketball tournament is the annual conference basketball championship tournament for the NCAA Division III Old Dominion Athletic Conference. The tournament has been held annually since 1977. It is a single-elimination tournament and seeding is based on regular season records.

The tournament winner receives the ODAC's automatic bid to the NCAA Men's Division III Basketball Championship.

== Results ==
Year	Champions	Score	Runner-up
1977	Washington and Lee	81–76	Lynchburg
1978	Washington and Lee	72–65	Lynchburg
1979	Lynchburg	73–71	Hampden–Sydney
1980	Washington and Lee	58–56	Hampden–Sydney
1981	Roanoke	78–53	Lynchburg
1982	Roanoke	72–54	Washington and Lee
1983	Roanoke	77–70	Eastern Mennonite
1984	Roanoke	93–78	Catholic
1985	Roanoke	69–57	Maryville (TN)
1986	Roanoke	68–53	Washington and Lee
1987	Roanoke	65–51	Lynchburg
1988	Bridgewater	64–63	Emory & Henry
1989	Hampden–Sydney	87–66	Washington and Lee
1990	Randolph–Macon	60–59	Emory & Henry
1991	Randolph–Macon	73–67	Emory & Henry
1992	Hampden–Sydney	97–70	Emory & Henry
1993	Virginia Wesleyan	70–61	Randolph–Macon
1994	Roanoke	103–83	Emory & Henry
1995	Hampden–Sydney	65–55	Roanoke
1996	Roanoke	74–72	Bridgewater
1997	Hampden–Sydney	102–70	Lynchburg
1998	Hampden–Sydney	52–51	Randolph–Macon
1999	Hampden–Sydney	73–61	Randolph–Macon
2000	Roanoke	69–63	Hampden–Sydney
2001	Hampden–Sydney	90–83	Roanoke
2002	Hampden–Sydney	55–48	Randolph–Macon
2003	Randolph–Macon	48–47	Hampden–Sydney
2004	Hampden–Sydney	75–69	Virginia Wesleyan
2005	Virginia Wesleyan	71–57	Randolph–Macon
2006	Virginia Wesleyan	81–78 (OT)	Randolph–Macon
2007	Hampden–Sydney	77–62	Roanoke
2008	Guilford	91–80 (OT)	Virginia Wesleyan
2009	Virginia Wesleyan	66–62	Washington and Lee
2010	Guilford	81–65	Randolph–Macon
2011	Randolph–Macon	68–43	Randolph
2012	Virginia Wesleyan	65–61	Randolph
2013	Randolph–Macon	75–64	Virginia Wesleyan
2014	Virginia Wesleyan	77–74	Hampden–Sydney
2015	Randolph–Macon	81–74	Virginia Wesleyan
2016	Lynchburg	62–60	Randolph
2017	Guilford	64–54	Emory & Henry
2018	Emory & Henry	72–70	Roanoke
2019	Guilford	70–59	Randolph–Macon
2020	Randolph–Macon	72–57	Virginia Wesleyan
2021	Randolph–Macon	70–62	Lynchburg
2022	Randolph–Macon	74–59	Virginia Wesleyan
2023	Randolph–Macon	61–48	Guilford
2024	Hampden–Sydney	81–56	Washington and Lee
2025	Guilford	79–74	Roanoke
2026	Roanoke	59–58	Randolph-Macon

== Championship records ==
School	Championships	Years
Roanoke	11	1981, 1982, 1983, 1984, 1985, 1986, 1987, 1994, 1996, 2000, 2026
Hampden–Sydney	11	1989, 1992, 1995, 1997, 1998, 1999, 2001, 2002, 2004, 2007, 2024
Randolph–Macon	10	1990, 1991, 2003, 2011, 2013, 2015, 2020, 2021, 2022, 2023
Virginia Wesleyan	6	1993, 2005, 2006, 2009, 2012, 2014
Guilford	5	2008, 2010, 2017, 2019, 2025
Washington and Lee	3	1977, 1978, 1980
Lynchburg	2	1979, 2016
Bridgewater	1	1988
Emory & Henry	1	2018

- Averett, Eastern Mennonite, Randolph, and Shenandoah have yet to claim an ODAC tournament title.
- Catholic and Maryville (TN) never qualified for the tournament final as members.
- Schools highlighted in pink are former members of the ODAC

== See also ==
- NCAA Men's Division III Basketball Championship
