= Colonial States Athletic Conference men's basketball tournament =

Colonial States Athletic Conference men's basketball tournament (defunct)
- Conference basketball championship
- Sport: College basketball
- Conference: Colonial States Athletic Conference
- Number of teams: 6
- Format: Single-elimination tournament
- Played: 1994–2023
- Most championships: Cabrini (13)
- Official website: CSAC men's basketball

The Colonial States Athletic Conference men's basketball tournament was the annual conference basketball championship tournament for the NCAA Division III Colonial States Athletic Conference. The tournament was held annually from 1994 to 2023, when the CSAC completed its merger into the United East Conference. All CSAC members at the time of the merger therefore became eligible for future iterations of the United East Men's Basketball Championship.

The tournament was single-elimination with seeding based on regular season records.

Prior to 2008, when the CSAC was known as the Pennsylvania Athletic Conference, the event was known as the Pennsylvania Athletic Conference men's basketball tournament.

The winner, declared conference champion, received the CSAC's automatic bid to the NCAA Men's Division III Basketball Championship.

== Results ==
=== Pennsylvania Athletic Conference ===
Year	Champions	Score	Runner-up
1994	Cabrini	114–79	Beaver
1995	Cabrini	85–74	Beaver
1996	Cabrini	85–67	Allentown
1997	Cabrini	80–66	Alvernia
1998	Cabrini	81–70	Alvernia
1999	Gwynedd Mercy	84–74	Misericordia
2000	Alvernia	88–72	Misericordia
2001	Cabrini	73–71	Alvernia
2002	Cabrini	71–67	Neumann
2003	Alvernia	80–73	Neumann
2004	Gwynedd Mercy	83–62	Alvernia
2005	Gwynedd Mercy	81–63	Alvernia
2006	Alvernia	66–63	Wesley
2007	Alvernia	70–55	Immaculata

=== Colonial States Athletic Conference ===
Year	Champions	Score	Runner-up
2008	Immaculata	85–68	Gwynedd Mercy
2009	Gwynedd Mercy	108–96	Cabrini
2010	Cabrini	97–73	Neumann
2011	Cabrini	92–70	Gwynedd Mercy
2012	Cabrini	86–78	Keystone
2013	Cabrini	90–74	Keystone
2014	Cabrini	96–79	Neumann
2015	Neumann	93–92 (OT)	Cabrini
2016	Gwynedd Mercy	84–70	Neumann
2017	Neumann	77–53	Gwynedd Mercy
2018	Cabrini	89–76	Neumann
2019	Rosemont	100–97	Cairn
2020	Cairn	113–105	Centenary (NJ)
2021	Cancelled due to the COVID-19 pandemic		
2022	Wilson (PA)	77–72	Cairn
2023	Wilson (PA)	89–68	Keystone

== Championship records ==
School	Finals Record	Finals Appearances	Years
Cabrini	13–2	15	1994, 1995, 1996, 1997, 1998, 2001, 2002, 2010, 2011, 2012, 2013, 2014, 2018
Gwynedd Mercy	5–3	8	1999, 2004, 2005, 2009, 2016
Alvernia	4–5	9	2000, 2003, 2006, 2007
Wilson (PA)	2–0	2	2022, 2023
Neumann	1–5	6	2017
Cairn	1–2	3	2020
Immaculata	1–1	2	2008
Rosemont	1–0	1	2019
Keystone	0–3	3	
Arcadia (Beaver)	0–2	2	
Misericordia	0–2	2	
Centenary (NJ)	0–1	1	
DeSales (Allentown)	0–1	1	
Wesley (DE)	0–1	1	

- Schools highlighted in pink departed the CSAC before it merged with the United East in 2023.
- Among the CSAC teams during its final season, Bryn Athyn, Clarks Summit, Saint Elizabeth, and Valley Forge never qualified for the tournament finals.
- Among the teams that departed the CSAC before its final season, Eastern and Marywood never reached the finals.

== See also ==
- United East Men's Basketball Championship
