= Centenary Gentlemen basketball =

- University: Centenary College of Louisiana
- Head coach: J.A. Anglin (1st season)
- Location: Shreveport, Louisiana
- Arena: Gold Dome (capacity: 3,000)
- Conference: Southern Collegiate Athletic Conference
- Nickname: Gentlemen
- Colors: Maroon and white

NCAA Division I tournament appearances
- Division III: 2020, 2024

Conference tournament champions
- SIAA: 1933; TAAC/A-Sun: 1980; SCAC: 2020, 2024

Conference regular-season champions
- TAAC/A-Sun: 1990

Uniforms
Home	Away

The Centenary Gentlemen basketball team represents Centenary College in Shreveport, Louisiana. The school's team is a member of the NCAA Division III Southern Collegiate Athletic Conference. They are currently led by head coach J.A. Anglin and play their home games at the Gold Dome.

From 1959 until 2011, Centenary competed at the NCAA Division I level as a member of the Trans America Athletic Conference (now Atlantic Sun Conference) and most recently the Summit League before re-classifying to Division III. Centenary did not make an appearance in the NCAA Division I men's basketball tournament in its over 50 years at the D-I level.

== Recent coaching history ==
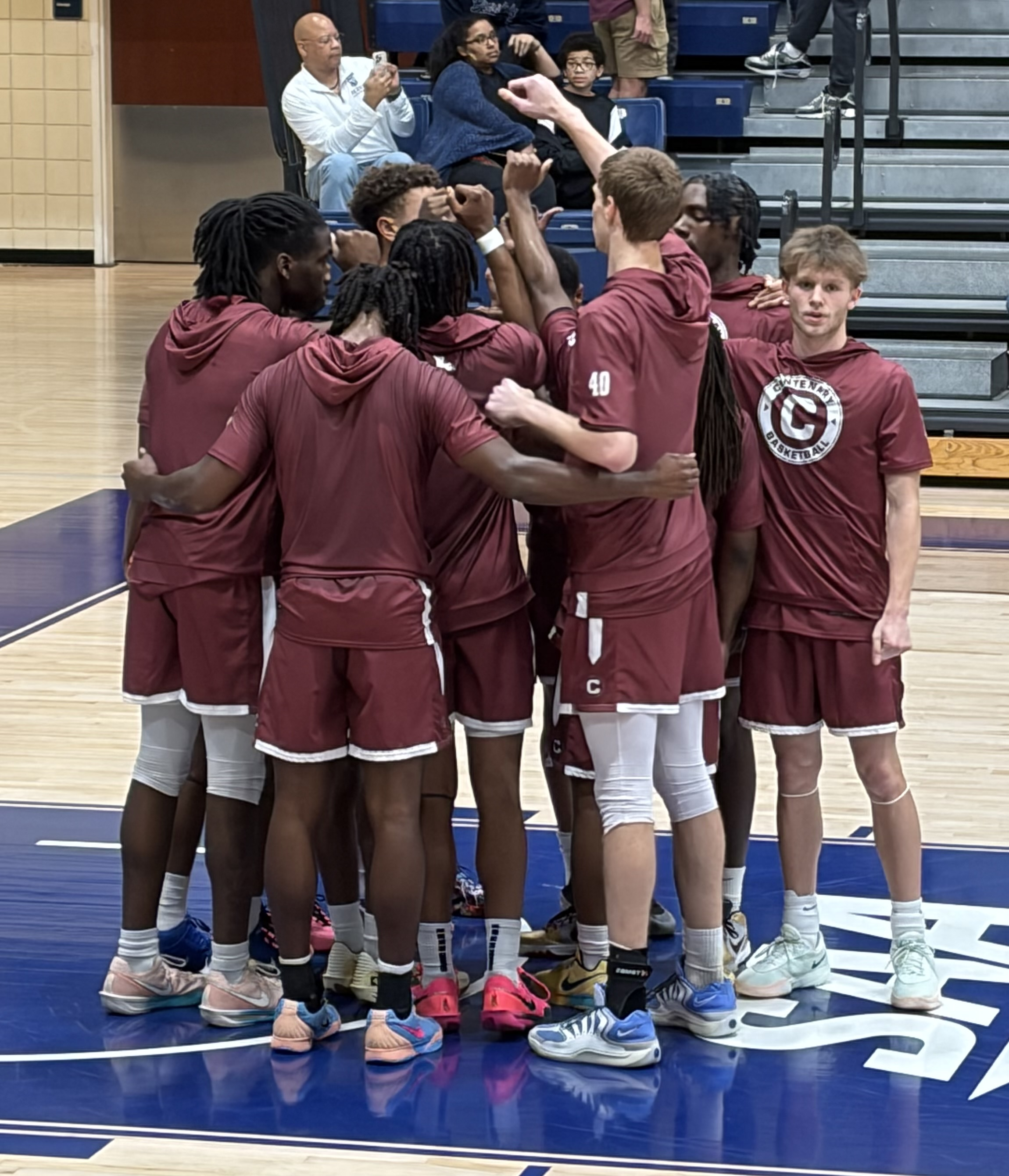
The 2025-26 Gentlemen

The Gentlemen were coached by Rob Flaska from 2005 until 2008. His contract was not renewed after the 2007–08 season. Greg Gary was hired to replace him. Mark Richmond has become the assistant coach for the Gents and brings big-time Big East experience from West Virginia to the staff. He has worked under both Bob Huggins and John Beilein. In 2010, Adam Walsh became the head coach of the Gents.

== Postseason results ==
=== NCAA Division III tournament results ===
The Gentlemen have appeared in the NCAA Division III tournament twice. Their record is 0–2.

Year	Round	Opponent	Result
2020	First Round	UT Dallas	L, 81–83
2024	First Round	Nebraska Wesleyan	L, 41–58

== Gentlemen in the NBA ==
- Robert Parish
- Larry Robinson
