= NECC men's basketball tournament =

NECC men's basketball tournament (defunct)
- Conference basketball championship
- Sport: College basketball
- Conference: New England Collegiate Conference
- Format: Single-elimination tournament
- Played: 2009–2023
- Most championships: Elms (4); Mitchell (4)
- Official website: NECC men's basketball

Host stadiums
- Campus arenas (2009–2023)

Host locations
- Campus venues (2009–2023)

The NECC men's basketball tournament was the annual conference basketball championship tournament for the NCAA Division III New England Collegiate Conference. The tournament was held annually from 2009 to 2023, when the NECC ceased to exist as an all-sports conference after the departure of its final four members.

It was a single-elimination tournament and seeding was based on regular season records.

The winner received the NECC's automatic bid to the NCAA Men's Division III Basketball Championship.

== Results ==
Year	Champions	Score	Runner-up	Venue
2009	Elms	105–76	Becker	Chicopee, MA
2010	Elms	79–68	Becker	Leicester, MA
2011	Elms	79–65	Becker	Leicester, MA
2012	Becker	66–45	Elms	Leicester, MA
2013	Elms	91–78	Regis	Chicopee, MA
2014	Mitchell	72–71	Elms	Chicopee, MA
2015	Regis	74–72	Southern Vermont	Bennington, VT
2016	Southern Vermont	74–72	Becker	Bennington, VT
2017	Becker	79–70	Southern Vermont	Bennington, VT
2018	Southern Vermont	67–62	Becker	Bennington, VT
2019	Mitchell	77–69	Newbury	New London, CT
2020	New England College	92–90	Mitchell	Henniker, NH
2021	Cancelled due to COVID-19 pandemic			
2022	Mitchell	87–73	Eastern Nazarene	Quincy, MA
2023	Mitchell	109–85	New England College	New London, CT

== Championship records ==
School	Finals Record	Finals Appearances	Years
Elms	4–2	6	2009, 2010, 2011, 2013
Mitchell	4–1	5	2014, 2019, 2022, 2023
Becker	2–5	7	2012, 2017
Southern Vermont	2–2	4	2016, 2018
New England College	1–1	2	2020
Regis	1–1	2	2015
Eastern Nazarene	0–1	1	
Newbury	0–1	1	

- Schools highlighted in pink departed the NECC before it ended sponsorship of men's basketball in 2023.
- Among the NECC teams during its final season, Lesley never qualified for the tournament finals
- Among the teams that departed the NECC before its final season, Daniel Webster, Dean, and Wheelock never qualified for the tournament finals
