= USA South Athletic Conference men's basketball tournament =

- Conference basketball championship
- Sport: Basketball
- Conference: USA South Athletic Conference; Dixie Intercollegiate Athletic Conference
- Number of teams: 8
- Format: Single-elimination tournament
- Played: 1964–present
- Current champion: North Carolina Wesleyan (6th)
- Most championships: Christopher Newport (15)
- Official website: USA South men's basketball

The USA South Athletic Conference men's basketball tournament (formerly the Dixie Intercollegiate Athletic Conference men's basketball tournament) is the annual conference basketball championship tournament for the NCAA Division III USA South Athletic Conference. The tournament has been held annually since 1964, when the conference was still known as the Dixie Intercollegiate Athletic Conference. It is a single-elimination tournament and seeding is based on regular season records.

The winner receives the USA South's automatic bid to the NCAA Men's Division III Basketball Championship.

== Results ==
Year	Champions	Score	Runner-up
1964	College of Charleston	94–69	St. Andrews (NC)
1965	Lynchburg	75–61	Charlotte College
1966	Lynchburg	104–94	St. Andrews (NC)
1967	Lynchburg	92–70	Greensboro
1968	St. Andrews (NC)	77–75	Lynchburg
1969	UNC Charlotte	78–69	St. Andrews (NC)
1970	UNC Charlotte	49–42	Lynchburg
1971	Lynchburg	88–76	Methodist
1972	Lynchburg	59–58	Methodist
1973	Methodist	113–90	Greensboro
1974	Methodist	44–38	St. Andrews (NC)
1975	Methodist	50–47	Lynchburg
1976	Lynchburg	61–59	Greensboro
1977	Methodist	77–52	Greensboro
1978	Virginia Wesleyan	85–63	Christopher Newport
1979	Virginia Wesleyan	79–74^{OT}	Christopher Newport
1980	UNC Greensboro	72–71	Christopher Newport
1981	St. Andrews (NC)	64–63	Christopher Newport
1982	St. Andrews (NC)	90–58	Virginia Wesleyan
1983	St. Andrews (NC)	59–56	North Carolina Wesleyan
1984	North Carolina Wesleyan	82–60	Greensboro
1985	Greensboro	85–81^{4OT}	St. Andrews (NC)
1986	Christopher Newport	57–45	North Carolina Wesleyan
1987	North Carolina Wesleyan	74–70	UNC Greensboro
1988	Christopher Newport	69–67^{OT}	St. Andrews (NC)
1989	Christopher Newport	54–51	North Carolina Wesleyan
1990	Averett	64–62	Christopher Newport
1991	Christopher Newport	83–63	Averett
1992	Ferrum	99–96	Christopher Newport
1993	Christopher Newport	74–69	North Carolina Wesleyan
1994	Greensboro	120–119^{OT}	Christopher Newport
1995	Greensboro	81–80	Christopher Newport
1996	Christopher Newport	103–93	Shenandoah
1997	Methodist	50–49	North Carolina Wesleyan
1998	Christopher Newport	77–60	Greensboro
1999	Christopher Newport	63–57	Methodist
2000	Christopher Newport	96–80	Averett
2001	Christopher Newport	87–74	Averett
2002	North Carolina Wesleyan	77–75	Christopher Newport
2003	Christopher Newport	67–64	North Carolina Wesleyan
2004	Methodist	83–71	Shenandoah
2005	Methodist	91–51	North Carolina Wesleyan
2006	Christopher Newport	89–88^{OT}	Averett
2007	Averett	108–105^{2OT}	North Carolina Wesleyan
2008	Averett	77–56	Greensboro
2009	Averett	70–63	Christopher Newport
2010	Christopher Newport	67–63	North Carolina Wesleyan
2011	North Carolina Wesleyan	74–70^{OT}	Ferrum
2012	Christopher Newport	82–72	Greensboro
2013	Christopher Newport	81–74	Greensboro
2014	LaGrange	94–84	Huntingdon
2015	LaGrange	70–64	Maryville (TN)
2016	Covenant	101–92^{OT}	LaGrange
2017	LaGrange	75–56	Methodist
2018	Maryville (TN)	96–77	Covenant
2019	Maryville (TN)	79–67	Methodist
2020	Methodist	79–73	Huntingdon
2021	Not held due to COVID-19 pandemic		
2022	Averett	76–63	Covenant
2023	North Carolina Wesleyan	80–61	William Peace
2024	Mary Baldwin	72–62	Greensboro
2025	Pfeiffer	108–80	North Carolina Wesleyan
2026	North Carolina Wesleyan	84–76	Pfeiffer

=== Divisional tournaments ===
Year	East Division			West Division		
Year	Champions	Score	Runner-up	Champions	Score	Runner-up
2021	Maryville (TN)	81–54	Piedmont	Pfeiffer	75–61	Averett

== Championship records ==
School	Championships	Years
Christopher Newport	15	1986, 1988, 1989, 1991, 1993, 1996, 1998, 1999, 2000, 2001, 2003, 2006, 2010, 2012, 2013
Methodist	8	1973, 1974, 1975, 1977, 1997, 2004, 2005, 2020
North Carolina Wesleyan	6	1984, 1987, 2002, 2011, 2023, 2026
Lynchburg	6	1965, 1966, 1967, 1971, 1972, 1976
Averett	5	1990, 2007, 2008, 2009, 2022
St. Andrews (NC)	4	1968, 1981, 1982, 1983
Greensboro	3	1985, 1994, 1995
LaGrange	3	2014, 2015, 2017
Maryville (TN)	2	2018, 2019
UNC Charlotte	2	1969, 1970
Virginia Wesleyan	2	1978, 1979
College of Charleston	1	1964
Covenant	1	2016
Ferrum	1	1992
Pfeiffer	1	2025
Mary Baldwin	1	2024
UNC Greensboro	1	1980

- Brevard and Southern Virginia have yet to advance to the USA South tournament final
- Berea and Chowan never reached the tournament finals while members of the USA South
- Schools highlighted in pink are former members of the USA South
