= Northwest Conference men's basketball tournament =

- Conference basketball championship
- Sport: Basketball
- Conference: Northwest Conference
- Number of teams: 4
- Format: Single-elimination tournament
- Played: 1994–present
- Current champion: Whitworth (17th)
- Most championships: Whitworth (17)
- Official website: NWC men's basketball

The Northwest Conference men's basketball tournament is the annual conference basketball championship tournament for the NCAA Division III Northwest Conference. The tournament has been held annually since 1994. It is a single-elimination tournament and seeding is based on regular season records.

The winner receives the NWC's automatic bid to the NCAA Men's Division III Basketball Championship.

Whitworth are the defending champions.

== Results ==
Year	Champions	Score	Runner-up	Venue
1994	Willamette	87–78	Lewis & Clark	Salem, OR
1995	Lewis & Clark	79–71	Willamette	Salem, OR
1996	Whitworth	66–53	Lewis & Clark	Spokane, WA
1997	Pacific (OR)	88–79	Lewis & Clark	Forest Grove, OR
1998	Lewis & Clark	79–61	Pacific Lutheran	Portland, OR
1999	Not held			
2000	Willamette	77–70	Linfield	McMinnville, OR
2001	Lewis & Clark	101–88	Linfield	Portland, OR
2002	Lewis & Clark	101–86	Whitworth	Portland, OR
2003	Whitworth	77–64	Willamette	Spokane, WA
2004	Not held			
2005	Not held			
2006	Puget Sound	94–86	Whitworth	Tacoma, WA
2007	Whitworth	69–62	Lewis & Clark	Spokane, WA
2008	Whitworth	96–69	Puget Sound	Spokane, WA
2009	Whitworth	90–80^{OT}	Puget Sound	Tacoma, WA
2010	Whitworth	97–75	George Fox	Spokane, WA
2011	Whitworth	74–50	Whitman	Spokane, WA
2012	Whitworth	86–71	Puget Sound	Spokane, WA
2013	Whitworth	93–72	Whitman	Spokane, WA
2014	Whitworth	71–68	Puget Sound	Spokane, WA
2015	Whitworth	69–58	Lewis & Clark	Spokane, WA
2016	Whitworth	75–62	Pacific Lutheran	Spokane, WA
2017	Whitman	86–83	Whitworth	Walla Walla, WA
2018	Whitworth	91–88	Whitman	Walla Walla, WA
2019	Whitman	107–102	Whitworth	Walla Walla, WA
2020	Whitman	86–80	Whitworth	Spokane, WA
2021	Cancelled due to COVID-19 pandemic			
2022	Whitworth	85–59	Whitman	Spokane, WA
2023	Whitworth	78–65	Whitman	Walla Walla, WA
2024	Whitworth	81–75	Whitman	Spokane, WA
2025	Lewis & Clark	70–57	Whitman	Spokane, WA
2026	Whitworth	97–87	Willamette	Spokane, WA

== Championship records ==
School	Finals Record	Finals Appearances	Years
Whitworth	17–5	22	1996, 2003, 2007, 2008, 2009, 2010, 2011, 2012, 2013, 2014, 2015, 2016, 2018, 2023, 2024
Lewis & Clark	5–5	10	1995, 1998, 2001, 2002, 2025
Whitman	3–6	9	2017, 2019, 2020
Willamette	2–4	6	1994, 2000
Puget Sound	1–4	5	2006
Pacific (OR)	1–0	1	1997
Linfield	0–2	2	
Pacific Lutheran	0–2	2	
George Fox	0–1	1	
