= Landmark Conference men's basketball tournament =

- Conference basketball championship
- Sport: Basketball
- Conference: Landmark Conference
- Number of teams: 6
- Format: Single-elimination tournament
- Played: 2008–present
- Current champion: Susquehanna (3rd)
- Most championships: Scranton (8)
- Official website: Landmark men's basketball

The Landmark Conference men's basketball tournament is the annual conference basketball championship tournament for the NCAA Division III Landmark Conference. The tournament has been held annually since 2008. It is a single-elimination tournament and seeding is based on regular season records.

The winner, declared conference champion, receives the Landmark's automatic bid to the NCAA Men's Division III Basketball Championship.

== Results ==
Year	Champions	Score	Runner-up
2008	Scranton	64–57	Juniata
2009	Scranton	80–75 (OT)	Susquehanna
2010	Merchant Marine	68–54	Scranton
2011	Scranton	82–71	Catholic
2012	Scranton	78–70	Juniata
2013	Catholic	63–62	Juniata
2014	Scranton	71–56	Susquehanna
2015	Scranton	76–65	Catholic
2016	Catholic	83–80	Susquehanna
2017	Scranton	68–63	Moravian
2018	Moravian	81–78	Juniata
2019	Moravian	86–72	Drew
2020	Susquehanna	86–69	Scranton
2021	Drew	84–78	Scranton
2022	Susquehanna	76–68	Drew
2023	Scranton	84–63	Juniata
2024	Catholic	87–65	Susquehanna
2025	Drew	85–70	Catholic
2026	Susquehanna	76–72	Wilkes

== Championship records ==
School	Finals Record	Finals Appearances	Years
Scranton	8–3	11	2008, 2009, 2011, 2012, 2014, 2015, 2017, 2023
Susquehanna	3–4	7	2020, 2022, 2026
Catholic	3–3	6	2013, 2016, 2024
Drew	2–2	4	2021, 2025
Moravian	2–1	3	2018, 2019
Merchant Marine	1–0	1	2010
Wilkes	0–1	1	
Juniata	0–5	5	

- Elizabethtown, Goucher, and Lycoming have not yet qualified for the Landmark tournament finals
- Schools highlighted in pink are former members of the Landmark Conference

== See also ==
- NCAA Men's Division III Basketball Championship
