= CCIW men's basketball tournament =

College Conference of Illinois and Wisconsin men's basketball tournament
- Conference basketball championship
- Sport: Basketball
- Conference: College Conference of Illinois and Wisconsin
- Number of teams: 6
- Format: Single-elimination tournament
- Played: 2006–present
- Current champion: Illinois Wesleyan (3rd)
- Most championships: Augustana (6)
- Official website: CCIW men's basketball

The College Conference of Illinois and Wisconsin men's basketball tournament is the annual conference basketball championship tournament for the NCAA Division III College Conference of Illinois and Wisconsin. The tournament has been held annually since 2006. It is a single-elimination tournament and seeding is based on regular conference season records.

The winner receives the CCIW's automatic bid to the NCAA Men's Division III Basketball Championship.

== Results ==
Year	Champions	Score	Runner-up	Site
2006	North Central	51–49	Illinois Wesleyan	Rock Island, IL
2007	Augustana	78–70	Elmhurst	Rock Island, IL
2008	Augustana	71–60	Illinois Wesleyan	Rock Island, IL
2009	Wheaton (IL)	67–63	Elmhurst	Wheaton, IL
2010	Carthage	70–67	Illinois Wesleyan	Kenosha, WI
2011	Augustana	76–52	Illinois Wesleyan	Naperville, IL
2012	North Central	75–58	Wheaton (IL)	Naperville, IL
2013	North Central	70–63	Augustana	Bloomington, IL
2014	Wheaton (IL)	87–66	Illinois Wesleyan	Bloomington, IL
2015	Augustana	78–74	Illinois Wesleyan	Rock Island, IL
2016	Augustana	69–53	Elmhurst	Rock Island, IL
2017	North Central	69–64	Augustana	Kenosha, WI
2018	Augustana	77–74	North Central	Rock Island, IL
2019	North Central	72–65	Augustana	Rock Island, IL
2020	Elmhurst	78–72	Illinois Wesleyan	Naperville, IL
2021	Illinois Wesleyan	71–58	Wheaton (IL)	Wheaton, IL
2022	Elmhurst	82–65	North Central	Bloomington, IL
2023	North Park	83–75	Elmhurst	Wheaton, IL
2024	Elmhurst	68–64	Illinois Wesleyan	Bloomington, IL
2025	Illinois Wesleyan	79–60	Carthage	Kenosha, WI
2026	Illinois Wesleyan	69–59 (OT)	Elmhurst	Bloomington, IL

== Championship records ==
School	Finals Record	Finals Appearances	Years
Augustana	6–3	9	2007, 2008, 2011, 2015, 2016, 2018
North Central	5–2	7	2006, 2012, 2013, 2017, 2019
Illinois Wesleyan	3–8	11	2021, 2025, 2026
Elmhurst	3–5	8	2020, 2022, 2024
Wheaton (IL)	2–2	4	2009, 2014
Carthage	1–1	2	2010
North Park	1–0	1	2023

- Carroll and Millikin have not yet qualified for the CCIW tournament finals.
