= Southern Athletic Association men's basketball tournament =

- Conference basketball championship
- Sport: Basketball
- Conference: Southern Athletic Association
- Number of teams: 6
- Format: Single-elimination tournament
- Played: 2013–present
- Current champion: Rhodes (3rd)
- Most championships: Berry (5)
- Official website: SAA men's basketball

The Southern Athletic Association men's basketball tournament is the annual conference basketball championship tournament for the NCAA Division III Southern Athletic Association. The tournament has been held annually since 2013. It is a single-elimination tournament and seeding is based on regular season records.

The winner receives the SAA's automatic bid to the NCAA Men's Division III Basketball Championship.

== Results ==
Year	Champions	Score	Runner-up	Venue
2013	Centre (KY)	46–44	Birmingham–Southern	Danville, KY
2014	Centre (KY)	72–62^{OT}	Oglethorpe	Danville, KY
2015	Rhodes	73–54	Birmingham–Southern	Memphis, TN
2016	Birmingham–Southern	68–50	Sewanee	Birmingham, AL
2017	Rhodes	98–95	Birmingham–Southern	Memphis, TN
2018	Berry	88–78	Hendrix	Danville, KY
2019	Sewanee	62–59	Centre	Danville, KY
2020	Centre (KY)	72–69	Berry	Danville, KY
2021	Berry	72–58	Oglethorpe	Mount Berry, GA
2022	Berry	63–62	Oglethorpe	Mount Berry, GA
2023	Sewanee	86–82	Berry	Mount Berry, GA
2024	Berry	74–57	Rhodes	Mount Berry, GA
2025	Berry	83–65	Centre (KY)	Mount Berry, GA
2026	Rhodes	79–76	Trinity	Mount Berry, GA

== Championship records ==
School	Finals Record	Finals Appearances	Years
Berry	5–1	6	2018, 2021, 2022, 2024, 2025
Centre (KY)	3–2	5	2013, 2014, 2020
Rhodes	3–1	4	2015, 2017, 2026
Birmingham–Southern	1–3	4	2016
Sewanee	2–1	3	2019, 2023
Oglethorpe	0–3	3	
Hendrix *	0–1	1	
Trinity	0–1	1	

* Millsaps and Southwestern have not yet qualified for the SAA tournament final.
* No longer member of the SAA
