= Southern Collegiate Athletic Conference men's basketball tournament =

- Conference basketball championship
- Sport: Basketball
- Conference: Southern Collegiate Athletic Conference
- Format: Single-elimination tournament
- Played: 1963–1973, 2003–present
- Current champion: St. Thomas (TX) (4th)
- Most championships: Trinity (TX) (6)
- Official website: SCAC men's basketball

The Southern Collegiate Athletic Conference men's basketball tournament is the annual conference basketball championship tournament for the NCAA Division III Southern Collegiate Athletic Conference. The current iteration of the tournament has been held annually since 2003; a prior incarnation was played between 1963 and 1973. The current version is a single-elimination tournament and seeding is based on regular season records.

The winner receives the SCAC's automatic bid to the NCAA Men's Division III Basketball Championship.

== Results ==
=== Tournament (1963–1971) ===
Year	Champions	Score	Runner-up	Venue
1963	Washington–St. Louis	68–62	Centre (KY)	Sewanee, TN
1964	Southwestern (TN)	97–74	Centre (KY)	Memphis, TN
1965	Washington–St. Louis	86–73	Southwestern (TN)	St. Louis, MO
1966	Sewanee	82–61	Washington–St. Louis	Danville, KY
1967	Washington and Lee	75–59	Southwestern (TN)	Lexington, VA
1968	Washington–St. Louis	58–53	Southwestern (TN)	Sewanee, TN
1969	Southwestern (TN)	73–55	Washington and Lee	Memphis, TN
1970	Washington and Lee	82–69	Washington–St. Louis	St. Louis, MO
1971	Washington and Lee	85–71	Southwestern (TN)	Danville, KY

=== Round-robin (1972–1973) ===
Year	Champions	Venue
1972	Centre (KY); Southwestern (TN); Washington and Lee	Lexington, VA
1973	Sewanee	Sewanee, TN

=== Tournament (2003–present) ===
Year	Champions	Score	Runner-up	Venue
2003	Trinity (TX)	58–54	Centre (KY)	Memphis, TN
2004	Trinity (TX)	81–69	Oglethorpe	Memphis, TN
2005	Trinity (TX)	72–53	Sewanee	Memphis, TN
2006	DePauw	64–61	Centre (KY)	Memphis, TN
2007	Centre (KY)	72–57	Trinity (TX)	Memphis, TN
2008	Millsaps	69–60	Centre (KY)	Conway, AR
2009	Centre (KY)	72–67	Southwestern (TX)	Conway, AR
2010	Centre (KY)	60–56	DePauw	Jackson, MS
2011	Centre (KY)	75–63	DePauw	Jackson, MS
2012	Trinity (TX)	61–50	Centre (KY)	Birmingham, AL
2013	Trinity (TX)	60–55 (OT)	Colorado College	Sherman, TX
2014	Trinity (TX)	82–70	Centenary (LA)	San Antonio, TX
2015	Texas Lutheran	80–75	Centenary (LA)	Irving, TX
2016	Texas Lutheran	80–77	Colorado College	Shreveport, LA
2017	Texas Lutheran	83–70	Schreiner	Georgetown, TX
2018	Schreiner	77–73	Centenary (LA)	Colorado Springs, CO
2019	Texas Lutheran	99–95 (2OT)	Dallas	Seguin, TX
2020	Centenary (LA)	77–56	Texas Lutheran	Kerrville, TX
2021	St. Thomas (TX)	80–66	Trinity (TX)	San Antonio, TX
2022	St. Thomas (TX)	77–58	Trinity (TX)	Sherman, TX
2023	Schreiner	69–67	Trinity (TX)	San Antonio, TX
2024	Centenary (LA)	83–76	Colorado College	Shreveport, LA
2025	St. Thomas (TX)	58–53 (OT)	Trinity (TX)	Irving, TX
2026	St. Thomas (TX)	92–74	Concordia Texas	Conway, AR

== Championship records ==
School	Finals Record	Finals Appearances	Years
Trinity (TX)	6–4	10	2003, 2004, 2005, 2012, 2013, 2014
Centre (KY)	7–6	13	1972*, 2007, 2009, 2010, 2011
Washington and Lee	4–2	6	1967, 1970, 1971, 1972*
Texas Lutheran	4–1	5	2015, 2016, 2017, 2019
St. Thomas (TX)	4–0	4	2021, 2022, 2025, 2026
Rhodes (Southwestern)	3–4	7	1964, 1969, 1972*
Washington–St. Louis	3–1	4	1963, 1965, 1968
Centenary (LA)	2–3	5	2020, 2024
Schreiner	2–1	2	2018, 2023
Sewanee	2–1	3	1966, 1973
DePauw	1–2	3	2006
Millsaps	1–0	1	2008
Colorado College	0–3	3	
Concordia Texas	0–1	1	
Dallas	0–1	1	
Oglethorpe	0–1	1	
Southwestern (TX)	0–1	1	

- Austin (TX), McMurry, and Ozarks have not yet qualified for the SCAC tournament finals
- Rose–Hulman, Birmingham–Southern, Hendrix, and Johnson & Wales–Denver never qualified for the finals while members of SCAC
- Schools highlighted in pink are former members of the Southern Collegiate Athletic Conference

== See also ==
- NCAA Division III men's basketball tournament
