= Collegiate Conference of the South men's basketball tournament =

US basketball championship tournament

- Conference basketball championship
- Sport: Basketball
- Conference: Collegiate Conference of the South
- Format: Single-elimination tournament
- Played: 2023–present
- Current champion: Belhaven (1st)
- Most championships: Maryville (TN) (2)
- Official website: CCS men's basketball

Host stadiums
- Campus sites (2023–present)

Host locations
- Campus sites (2023–present)

The Collegiate Conference of the South men's basketball tournament is the annual conference basketball championship tournament for the NCAA Division III Collegiate Conference of the South. The tournament's inaugural edition was held in 2023. It is a single-elimination tournament and seeding is based on regular conference season records.

Since 2025, the winner has received an automatic bid to the NCAA Men's Division III Basketball Championship.

== Results ==
Year	Champions	Score	Runner-up	Site
2023	Maryville (TN)	84–74	Belhaven	Maryville, TN
2024	Maryville (TN)	97–75	Belhaven	Maryville, TN
2025	Huntingdon	93–92	Maryville (TN)	Maryville, TN
2026	Belhaven	92–73	LaGrange	LaGrange, GA

== Championship records ==
School	Finals Record	Finals Appearances	Years
Maryville (TN)	2–1	3	2023, 2024
Belhaven	1–2	1	2026
Huntingdon	1–0	1	2025
LaGrange	0–1	1	

- Asbury, Covenant, and Piedmont have not yet qualified for the CCS tournament finals.
- Berea did not qualify for the tournament finals as a CCS member

== See also ==
- NCAA Men's Division III Basketball Championship
