= North Atlantic Conference Men's Basketball Championship =

Annual conference basketball championship tournament

North Atlantic Conference men's basketball tournament
- Conference basketball championship
- Sport: Basketball
- Conference: North Atlantic Conference
- Format: Single-elimination tournament
- Current champion: Maine–Farmington (2nd)
- Official website: NAC men's basketball

Host stadiums
- Campus arenas (2004–present)

Host locations
- Campus sites (2004–present)

The North Atlantic Conference men's basketball tournament is the annual conference basketball championship tournament for the NCAA Division III North Atlantic Conference. It is a single-elimination tournament and seeding is based on regular season records.

The winner receives the North Atlantic's automatic bid to the NCAA Men's Division III Basketball Championship.

== Results ==
- Record is incomplete prior to 2004

Year	Champions	Score	Runner-up	Venue
2004	Lasell	88–74	Castleton State	Newton, MA
2005	Elms	70–66	Lasell	Newton, MA
2006	Elms	94–82	Maine–Farmington	Bangor, ME
2007	Elms	81–69	Husson	Bangor, ME
2008	Elms	72–65	Lesley	Chicopee, MA
2009	Husson	73–60	Thomas	Waterville, ME
2010	Maine–Farmington	65–51	Castleton State	Farmington, ME
2011	Husson	84–73	Lyndon State	Bangor, ME
2012	Castleton State	102–76	Colby-Sawyer	Castleton, VT
2013	Husson	74–68	Castleton State	Farmington, ME
2014	Husson	96–89 (OT)	Maine–Farmington	Bangor, ME
2015	Colby-Sawyer	86–73	Husson	New London, NH
2016	Husson	94–77	Colby-Sawyer	Bangor, ME
2017	Husson	89–67	Thomas	Bangor, ME
2018	New England	72–56	Colby-Sawyer	Henniker, NH
2019	Husson	82–67	Thomas	Farmington, ME
2020	SUNY Canton	72–71	Maine–Farmington	Farmington, ME
2021	Cancelled due to COVID-19 pandemic			
2022	Husson	57–53	SUNY Poly	Bangor, ME
2023	SUNY Delhi	83–77	Maine–Farmington	Farmington, ME
2024	Husson	80–70	SUNY Cobleskill	Cobleskill, NY
2025	Husson	90–57	VTSU Johnson	Bangor, ME
2026	Maine–Farmington	84–58	Maine–Presque Isle	Farmington, ME

== Championship records ==
- Results incomplete before 2004

School	Finals Record	Finals Appearances	Years
Husson	10–2	12	2009, 2011, 2013, 2014, 2016, 2017, 2019, 2022, 2024, 2025
Elms	4–0	4	2005, 2006, 2007, 2008
Maine–Farmington	2–4	6	2010, 2026
Colby-Sawyer	1–3	4	2015
Castleton (Castleton State)	1–3	4	2012
Lasell	1–1	2	2004
SUNY Delhi	1–0	1	2023
SUNY Canton	1–0	1	2020
New England	1–0	1	2018
Thomas	0–3	3	
Maine–Presque Isle	0–1	1	
VTSU Johnson	0–1	1	
Lesley	0–1	1	
SUNY Cobleskill	0–1	1	
SUNY Poly	0–1	1	
VTSU Lyndon	0–1	1	

- Schools highlighted in pink are former members of the North Atlantic
- Maine Maritime have not yet qualified for the tournament finals
- Becker, Cazenovia, Eastern Nazarene, Green Mountain, Mount Ida, SUNY Morrisville, and Wheelock never qualified for the tournament finals as North Atlantic members

== See also ==
- NCAA Men's Division III Basketball Championship
