= NEWMAC men's basketball tournament =

- Conference basketball championship
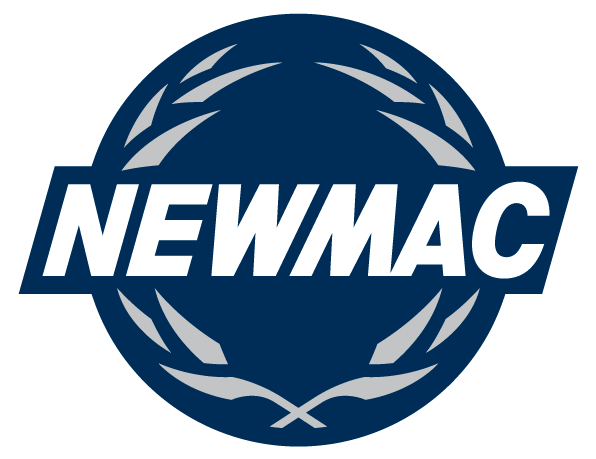
- Sport: Basketball
- Conference: NEWMAC
- Number of teams: 5
- Format: Single-elimination tournament
- Played: 1999–present
- Current champion: Babson (7th)
- Most championships: Babson (7)
- Official website: newmacsports.com/mbball

The NEWMAC men's basketball tournament is the annual conference basketball championship tournament for the NCAA Division III New England Women's and Men's Athletic Conference. The tournament has been held annually since 1999. It is a single-elimination tournament and seeding is based on regular season records.

The winner receives the NEWMAC's automatic bid to the NCAA Men's Division III Basketball Championship.

== Results ==
Year	Champions	Score	Runner-up	Venue
1999	Clark (1)	72–69	Springfield	Worcester, MA
2000	Springfield (1)	68–60	Clark	Worcester, MA
2001	Clark (2)	77–57	Babson	Worcester, MA
2002	Babson (1)	44–42	Wheaton (MA)	Wellesley, MA
2003	Clark (3)	84–76 ({aet})	Babson	Worcester, MA
2004	Babson (2)	72–70	Springfield	Wellesley, MA
2005	WPI (1)	64–60	Wheaton (MA)	Worcester, MA
2006	WPI (2)	69–56	MIT	Worcester, MA
2007	Coast Guard (1)	71–66	WPI	Worcester, MA
2008	Coast Guard (2)	82–66	WPI	Worcester, MA
2009	MIT (1)	76–50	Springfield	Worcester, MA
2010	Clark (4)	74–68	WPI	Cambridge, MA
2011	MIT (2)	63–52	WPI	Worcester, MA
2012	MIT (3)	65–60	Springfield	Cambridge, MA
2013	WPI (3)	79–72 ({aet})	Springfield	Worcester, MA
2014	MIT (4)	67–56	Springfield	Worcester, MA
2015	Babson (3)	72–62	Springfield	Wellesley, MA
2016	Babson (4)	81–69	MIT	Wellesley, MA
2017	MIT (5)	67–62	Babson	Wellesley, MA
2018	MIT (6)	63–57	WPI	Springfield, MA
2019	Emerson (1)	93–75	WPI	Boston, MA
2020	Coast Guard (3)	89–86	WPI	Worcester, MA
2021	(Cancelled due to COVID-19 pandemic)			
2022	WPI (4)	70–54	Emerson	Worcester, MA
2023	Babson (5)	59–53	WPI	Worcester, MA
2024	Babson (6)	73–64	Clark	Worcester, MA
2025	Clark (5)	80–65	WPI	Worcester, MA
2026	Babson (7)	81–56	Wheaton (MA)	Babson Park, MA

== Championship records ==
School	Titles	Finals rec.	Finals app.	Winning years
Babson	7	7–3	10	2002, 2004, 2015, 2016, 2023, 2024, 2026
MIT	6	6–2	8	2009, 2011, 2012, 2014, 2016, 2017
Clark	5	5–2	7	1999, 2001, 2003, 2010, 2025
WPI	4	4–9	13	2005, 2006, 2013, 2022
Coast Guard	3	3–0	3	2007, 2008, 2020
Springfield	1	1–7	8	2000
Emerson	1	1–1	2	2019
Wheaton (MA)	–	0–3	3	
