= NESCAC men's basketball tournament =

- Conference basketball championship
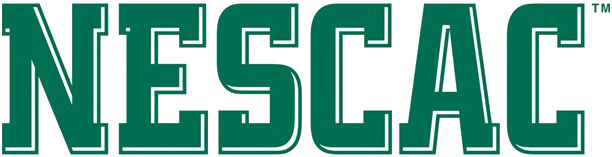
- Sport: Basketball
- Conference: NESCAC
- Number of teams: 8
- Format: Single-elimination tournament
- Played: 2001–present
- Current champion: Trinity (4th)
- Most championships: Amherst (8)
- Official website: nescac.com/sports/mbball

The NESCAC men's basketball tournament is the annual conference basketball championship tournament for the NCAA Division III New England Small College Athletic Conference. The tournament has been held annually since 2001. It is a single-elimination tournament and seeding is based on regular season records.

As conference champion, the winner receives the NESCAC's automatic bid to the NCAA Men's Division III Basketball Championship.

== Results ==
Year	Champion	Score	Runner-up	Venue	City
2001	Amherst	86–75	Trinity	Oosting Gymnasium	Hartford, Connecticut
2002	Amherst	85–78	Trinity	Oosting Gymnasium	Hartford, Connecticut
2003	Williams	74–70	Amherst	LeFrak Gymnasium	Amherst, Massachusetts
2004	Williams	79–67	Amherst	John Wesley Chandler Gymnasium	Williamstown, Massachusetts
2005	Amherst	65–57	Bates	LeFrak Gymnasium	Amherst, Massachusetts
2006	Amherst	94–86 (OT)	Tufts	LeFrak Gymnasium	Amherst, Massachusetts
2007	Williams	70–69	Amherst	LeFrak Gymnasium	Amherst, Massachusetts
2008	Trinity	74–55	Bowdoin	LeFrak Gymnasium	Amherst, Massachusetts
2009	Middlebury	77–68	Amherst	Pepin Gymnasium	Middlebury, Vermont
2010	Williams	64–56	Middlebury	John Wesley Chandler Gymnasium	Williamstown, Massachusetts
2011	Middlebury	63–54	Williams	John Wesley Chandler Gymnasium	Williamstown, Massachusetts
2012	Amherst	71–69	Middlebury	LeFrak Gymnasium	Amherst, Massachusetts
2013	Amherst	74–73	Williams	LeFrak Gymnasium	Amherst, Massachusetts
2014	Amherst	93–82	Williams	LeFrak Gymnasium	Amherst, Massachusetts
2015	Wesleyan	74–70 (OT)	Amherst	Oosting Gymnasium	Hartford, Connecticut
2016	Middlebury	81–79	Amherst	Oosting Gymnasium	Hartford, Connecticut
2017	Middlebury	84–62	Williams	Cousens Gymnasium	Medford, Massachusetts
2018	Williams	69–68	Wesleyan	LeFrak Gymnasium	Amherst, Massachusetts
2019	Amherst	62–56	Hamilton	Margaret Bundy Scott Field House	Clinton, New York
2020	Tufts	102–94 (2OT)	Colby	Cousens Gymnasium	Medford, Massachusetts
2021	Cancelled due to COVID-19 pandemic				
2022	Wesleyan	78–75 (OT)	Williams	Silloway Gymnasium	Middletown, Connecticut
2023	Hamilton	71–59	Colby	Chandler Gymnasium	Williamstown, Massachusetts
2024	Trinity	59–52	Williams	Chandler Gymnasium	Williamstown, Massachusetts
2025	Trinity	75–67	Wesleyan	Silloway Gymnasium	Middletown, Connecticut
2026	Trinity	80–55	Wesleyan	Silloway Gymnasium	Middletown, Connecticut

== Championship records ==
School	Finals rec.	Finals app.	Years
Amherst	8–6	14	2001, 2002, 2005, 2006, 2012, 2013, 2014, 2019
Williams	5–6	11	2003, 2004, 2007, 2010, 2018
Trinity	4–2	6	2008, 2024, 2025, 2026
Middlebury	4–2	6	2009, 2011, 2016, 2017
Wesleyan	2–3	4	2015, 2022
Hamilton	1–1	2	2023
Tufts	1–1	2	2020
Bates	0–1	1	
Bowdoin	0–1	1	
Colby	0–2	2	

- Connecticut College has not yet qualified for the tournament finals

== See also ==
- NCAA Men's Division III Basketball Championship
