= Atlantic East Conference men's basketball tournament =

American college basketball championship

Atlantic East Conference Association men's basketball tournament
- Conference basketball championship
- Sport: Basketball
- Conference: Atlantic East Conference
- Number of teams: 6
- Format: Single-elimination tournament
- Played: 2019–present
- Current champion: Neumann (3rd)
- Most championships: Neumann (3)
- Official website: Atlantic East men's basketball

Host stadiums
- Campus arenas (2018–present)

Host locations
- Campus venues (2018–present)

The Atlantic East Conference men's basketball tournament is the annual conference basketball championship tournament for the NCAA Division III Atlantic East Conference. The annual tournament was held for the first time in 2019, the first season of competitive play in the conference. It is a single-elimination tournament and seeding is based on regular season records.

The winner receives the Atlantic East's automatic bid to the NCAA Men's Division III Basketball Championship.

== Results ==
Year	Champions	Score	Runner-up	Venue
2019	Gwynedd Mercy	75–69	Marymount	Gwynedd Valley, PA
2020	Wesley	91–88	Gwynedd Mercy	Dover, DE
2021	Cancelled due to the COVID-19 pandemic			
2022	Neumann	61–59	Marymount	Arlington, VA
2023	Marymount	57–52	Neumann	Arlington, VA
2024	Marymount	83–72	Gwynedd Mercy	Arlington, VA
2025	Neumann	83–77	Marymount	Aston, PA
2026	Neumann	66–65	Gwynedd Mercy	Gwynedd Valley, PA

== Championship records ==
School	Finals Record	Finals Appearances	Years
Neumann	3–1	4	2022, 2025, 2026
Marymount	2–3	5	2023, 2024
Gwynedd Mercy	1–3	4	2019
Wesley	1–0	1	2020

- Centenary (NJ), Immaculata, Marywood, and Pratt have not yet qualified for the tournament finals
- Cabrini never qualified for the tournament finals as AEC members.
- Schools highlighted in pink are former members of the AEC
