= SCIAC men's basketball tournament =

Southern California Intercollegiate Athletic Conference men's basketball tournament
- Conference basketball championship
- Sport: Basketball
- Conference: Southern California Intercollegiate Athletic Conference
- Number of teams: 4
- Format: Single-elimination tournament
- Played: 2008–present
- Current champion: Redlands (3rd)
- Most championships: Claremont–Mudd–Scripps (8)
- Official website: SCIAC men's basketball

The Southern California Intercollegiate Athletic Conference men's basketball tournament is the annual conference men's basketball championship tournament for the NCAA Division III Southern California Intercollegiate Athletic Conference (SCIAC). The tournament has been held annually since 2008. It is a single-elimination tournament and seeding is based on regular season records.

The winner, declared conference champion, receives the SCIAC's automatic bid to the NCAA Men's Division III Basketball Championship.

Claremont–Mudd–Scripps have been the most successful program, with seven titles.

== Results ==
Year	Champions	Score	Runner-up	Venue
2008	Pomona–Pitzer	55–53	Claremont–Mudd–Scripps	Claremont, CA
2009	Claremont–Mudd–Scripps	56–44	Pomona–Pitzer	Claremont, CA
2010	Claremont–Mudd–Scripps	57–55	Pomona–Pitzer	Claremont, CA
2011	Redlands	63–54	Claremont–Mudd–Scripps	Redlands, CA
2012	Claremont–Mudd–Scripps	60–54	Pomona–Pitzer	Claremont, CA
2013	Redlands	73–64	Claremont–Mudd–Scripps	Redlands, CA
2014	Chapman	79–51	Cal Lutheran	Orange, CA
2015	Claremont–Mudd–Scripps	71–66	Chapman	Orange, CA
2016	Chapman	71–69	Redlands	Orange, CA
2017	Claremont–Mudd–Scripps	77–71	Cal Lutheran	Claremont, CA
2018	Claremont–Mudd–Scripps	86–62	Pomona–Pitzer	Claremont, CA
2019	Pomona–Pitzer	68–45	Occidental	Claremont, CA
2020	Pomona–Pitzer	87–66	Redlands	Claremont, CA
2021	Cancelled due to COVID-19 pandemic			
2022	Pomona–Pitzer	76–71	Chapman	Claremont, CA
2023	Cal Lutheran	69–68	Redlands	Redlands, CA
2024	Claremont–Mudd–Scripps	61–55	Cal Lutheran	Thousand Oaks, CA
2025	Claremont–Mudd–Scripps	72–71	Cal Lutheran	Thousand Oaks, CA
2026	Redlands	93–64	Chapman	Redlands, CA

== Championship records ==
School	Finals Record	Finals Appearances	Years
Claremont–Mudd–Scripps	8–3	11	2009, 2010, 2012, 2015, 2017, 2018, 2024, 2025
Pomona–Pitzer	4–4	8	2008, 2019, 2020, 2022
Redlands	3–3	6	2011, 2013, 2026
Chapman	2–3	5	2014, 2016
Cal Lutheran	1–4	5	2023
Occidental	0–1	1	

- Caltech, La Verne, and Whittier have not appeared in the SCIAC tournament finals.
