= NCAC men's basketball tournament =

- Conference basketball championship
- Sport: Basketball
- Conference: North Coast Athletic Conference
- Format: Single-elimination tournament
- Played: 1985–present
- Current champion: John Carroll (1st)
- Most championships: Wooster (16)
- Official website: NCAC men's basketball

Host stadiums
- Campus gyms (1985–present)

Host locations
- Campus sites (1985–present)

The NCAC men's basketball tournament is the annual conference basketball championship tournament for the NCAA Division III North Coast Athletic Conference. The tournament has been held annually since 1985. It is a single-elimination tournament and seeding is based on regular season records.

The winner receives the NCAC's automatic bid to the NCAA Men's Division III Basketball Championship.

With sixteen titles, Wooster are the most successful team.

== Results ==
Year	Champions	Score	Runner-up	Venue
1985	Ohio Wesleyan	65–59	Allegheny	Delaware, OH
1986	Ohio Wesleyan	69–64	Kenyon	Meadville, PA
1987	Allegheny	96–94	Ohio Wesleyan	Delaware, OH
1988	Ohio Wesleyan	91–77	Allegheny	Wooster, OH
1989	Allegheny	56–54	Wooster	Gambier, OH
1990	Wittenberg	86–62	Ohio Wesleyan	Granville, OH
1991	Wittenberg	65–48	Wooster	Wooster, OH
1992	Wooster	61–54	Wittenberg	Wooster, OH
1993	Wooster	64–48	Kenyon	Delaware, OH
1994	Kenyon	84–78	Wittenberg	Delaware, OH
1995	Wooster	71–67	Wittenberg	Springfield, OH
1996	Wittenberg	65–55	Allegheny	Springfield, OH
1997	Wooster	51–44	Wittenberg	Wooster, OH
1998	Allegheny	66–64	Wooster	Springfield, OH
1999	Wooster	89–69	Allegheny	Wooster, OH
2000	Wooster	114–91	Wabash	Wooster, OH
2001	Wooster	59–56	Wittenberg	Springfield, OH
2002	Wittenberg	58–57	Wooster	Springfield, OH
2003	Wooster	93–71	Allegheny	Wooster, OH
2004	Wooster	100–71	Wittenberg	Springfield, OH
2005	Wittenberg	61–59	Wooster	Wooster, OH
2006	Wittenberg	71–69	Wooster	Wooster, OH
2007	Wooster	86–51	Ohio Wesleyan	Wooster, OH
2008	Ohio Wesleyan	89–72	Wabash	Wooster, OH
2009	Wooster	84–72	Wabash	Wooster, OH
2010	Wooster	88–77	Wittenberg	Wooster, OH
2011	Wooster	82–68	Wittenberg	Wooster, OH
2012	Wooster	53–51	Denison	Springfield, OH
2013	Ohio Wesleyan	76–66	Wooster	Wooster, OH
2014	Wooster	71–63	Wittenberg	Wooster, OH
2015	DePauw	69–56	Wooster	Delaware, OH
2016	Denison	92–81 (OT)	Wooster	Delaware, OH
2017	Wooster	76–72	Ohio Wesleyan	Delaware, OH
2018	Wittenberg	82–70 (OT)	Ohio Wesleyan	Springfield, OH
2019	Wittenberg	79–75	Wooster	Wooster, OH
2020	Wooster	87–63	Wittenberg	Springfield, OH
2021	Cancelled due to COVID-19 pandemic			
2022	Wabash	85–84 (OT)	Wooster	Crawfordsville, IN
2023	Wabash	81–80	Wooster	Wooster, OH
2024	Wabash	75–64	Wooster	Crawfordsville, IN
2025	Denison	79–68	Wooster	Granville, OH
2026	John Carroll	84–66	Denison	Granville, OH

== Championship records ==
School	Finals record	Finals appearances	Years
Wooster	16–14	30	1992, 1993, 1995, 1997, 1999, 2000, 2001, 2003, 2004, 2007, 2009, 2010, 2011, 2012, 2014, 2017, 2020
Wittenberg	8–10	18	1990, 1991, 1996, 2002, 2005, 2006, 2018, 2019
Ohio Wesleyan	5–5	10	1985, 1986, 1988, 2008, 2013
Allegheny	3–5	8	1987, 1989, 1998
Wabash	3–3	6	2022, 2023, 2024
Denison	2–2	4	2016, 2025
Kenyon	1–2	3	1994
John Carroll	1–0	1	2026
DePauw	1–0	1	2015

- Schools highlighted in pink are former NCAC members.
- Oberlin have yet to advance to a tournament final.
- Case Western, Earlham, and Hiram never qualified for the tournament finals as conference members.

== See also ==
- NCAA Men's Division III Basketball Championship
