= Midwest Conference men's basketball tournament =

- Conference basketball championship
- Sport: Basketball
- Conference: Midwest Conference
- Number of teams: 4
- Format: Single-elimination tournament
- Played: 1991–present
- Current champion: Grinnell (4th)
- Most championships: Ripon (8)
- Official website: Midwest men's basketball

Host stadiums
- Campus gyms (1991–present)

Host locations
- Campus sites (1991–present)

The Midwest Conference men's basketball tournament is the annual conference basketball championship tournament for the NCAA Division III Midwest Conference. The tournament has been held annually since 1991. It is a single-elimination tournament and seeding is based on regular season records.

As conference champion, the winner receives the Midwest's automatic bid to the NCAA Men's Division III Basketball Championship.

== Results ==
Year	Champions	Score	Runner-up
1991	Ripon	74-59	Beloit
1992	Ripon	84-75	Cornell
1993	Beloit	86-83	Ripon
1994	Cornell	69-60	Ripon
1995	Beloit	61-58	Ripon
1996	Grinnell	114-92	Ripon
1997	Lawrence	90-79	Knox
1998	Ripon	73-60	Lawrence
1999	Ripon	71-58	St. Norbert
2000	Ripon	85-58	Lawrence
2001	Grinnell	130–122	Illinois College
2002	Ripon	54–45	St. Norbert
2003	Illinois College	101–91	Grinnell
2004	Lawrence	82–71	Carroll
2005	Lawrence	82–77 (2OT)	Ripon
2006	Lawrence	68–62	Carroll
2007	Carroll	80–71	Lake Forest
2008	Lawrence	98–95 (OT)	Carroll
2009	Lawrence	88–69	Grinnell
2010	St. Norbert	85–74	Carroll
2011	St. Norbert	89–67	Grinnell
2012	Carroll	87–65	St. Norbert
2013	St. Norbert	92–68	Carroll
2014	St. Norbert	99–86	Grinnell
2015	St. Norbert	91–73	Grinnell
2016	St. Norbert	71–69	Carroll
2017	Ripon	81–72	Lake Forest
2018	Monmouth	79–76	Ripon
2019	Lake Forest	68–64	St. Norbert
2020	Ripon	84–71	St. Norbert
2021	Cancelled due to COVID-19 pandemic		
2022	Cornell	82–79 (2OT)	Ripon
2023	Illinois College	70–61	Cornell
2024	Illinois College	108–84	Grinnell
2025	Grinnell	95–82	Lake Forest
2026	Grinnell	85–56	Monmouth

== Championship records ==
- Since 1991 (Start of four-team conference tournament)

School	Finals Record	Finals Appearances	Championship Years
Ripon	8–7	15	1991, 1992, 1998, 1999, 2000, 2002, 2017, 2020
St. Norbert	6–5	11	2010, 2011, 2013, 2014, 2015, 2016
Lawrence	6–2	8	1997, 2004, 2005, 2006, 2008, 2009
Grinnell	4–6	10	1996, 2001, 2025, 2026
Illinois College	3–1	4	2003, 2023, 2024
Carroll	2–6	8	2007, 2012
Cornell	2–2	4	1994, 2022
Beloit	2–1	3	1993, 1995
Lake Forest	1–3	4	2019
Monmouth	1–1	2	2018
Knox	0–1	1	NA

- Schools highlighted in pink are former members of the league
- Coe never qualified for the finals as league members
