= United East Men's Basketball Championship =

United East men's basketball tournament
- Conference basketball championship
- Sport: Basketball
- Conference: United East Conference
- Format: Single-elimination tournament
- Played: 2005–present
- Current champion: Penn State Harrisburg (4th)
- Most championships: Morrisville State (5)
- Official website: gounitedeast.com/sports/mbball

Host stadiums
- Campus arenas (2005–present)

Host locations
- Campus sites (2005–present)

The United East men's basketball tournament is the annual conference basketball championship tournament for the NCAA Division III United East Conference. The tournament has been held annually since the conference was founded in 2005 as the North Eastern Athletic Conference. The conference adopted its current name for the 2021–22 season, and underwent a major expansion in 2023 when it merged with the Colonial States Athletic Conference, with the two leagues agreeing to operate under the United East banner. It is a single-elimination tournament and seeding is based on regular season records.

The winner receives the United East's automatic bid to the NCAA Men's Division III Basketball Championship.

== Results ==
=== North Eastern Athletic Conference ===
Year	Champions	Score	Runner-up	Venue
2005	Keystone	79–70	Villa Julie	Philadelphia, PA
2006	Keystone	84–77	Villa Julie	La Plume, PA
2007	Villa Julie	94–92 (OT)	Chestnut Hill	Stevenson, MD
2008	Baptist Bible	84–73	Cazenovia	Cazenovia, NY
2009	SUNY Poly	78–49	Wells	Utica, NY
2010	SUNY Poly	99–71	Wells	Utica, NY
2011	Wells	75–72 (OT)	Penn State Harrisburg	Middletown, PA
2012	Morrisville State	76–72	Penn State Harrisburg	Morrisville, NY
2013	Morrisville State	74–72	Wells	Morrisville, NY
2014	Morrisville State	73–65	Lancaster Bible	Lancaster, PA
2015	SUNY Cobleskill	49–46	Lancaster Bible	Lancaster, PA
2016	Lancaster Bible	97–71	Morrisville State	Lancaster, PA
2017	Morrisville State	70–63	Lancaster Bible	Washington, DC
2018	Lancaster Bible	74–69	Morrisville State	Lancaster, PA
2019	Morrisville State	91–73	SUNY Poly	Gansevoort, NY
2020	Penn State Harrisburg	76–69 (OT)	Lancaster Bible	Latham, NY
2021	Cancelled due to COVID-19 pandemic			

=== United East Conference ===
Year	Champions	Score	Runner-up	Venue
2022	Penn State Harrisburg	85–52	Lancaster Bible	Lancaster, PA
2023	Lancaster Bible	87–76	Penn State Abington	Lancaster, PA
2024	Penn State Harrisburg	84–61	Saint Elizabeth	Middletown, PA
2025	Bryn Athyn	82–69	Notre Dame Maryland	Bryn Athyn, PA
2026	Penn State Harrisburg	72–71	Cairn	Langhorne, PA

== Championship records ==
Schools in red are not United East members as of the 2023–24 season.

School	Finals Record	Finals Appearances	Years
Morrisville State	5–2	7	2012, 2013, 2014, 2017, 2019
Lancaster Bible	3–4	7	2016, 2018, 2023
Penn State Harrisburg	4–2	6	2020, 2022, 2024, 2026
SUNY Poly	2–1	3	2009, 2010
Keystone	2–0	2	2005, 2006
Wells	1–3	4	2011
Stevenson (Villa Julie)	1–2	3	2007
Bryn Athyn	1–0	1	2025
Clarks Summit (Baptist Bible)	1–0	1	2008
SUNY Cobleskill	1–0	1	2015
Cairn	0–1	1	
Notre Dame Maryland	0–1	1	
Saint Elizabeth	0–1	1	
Penn State Abington	0–1	1	
Cazenovia	0–1	1	
Chestnut Hill	0–1	1	

- Cedar Crest, Gallaudet, Penn College, Penn State Berks, Penn State Brandywine, Rosemont, St. Mary's (MD), Valley Forge, and Wilson have yet to advance to the NEAC or United East tournament finals.
- Bard, D'Youville, Keuka, NYU Poly, SUNY Purchase, and SUNY Morrisville never advanced for the tournament finals as NEAC members.
