= Batten Marlins =

- University: Batten University
- NCAA: Division III
- Conference: Old Dominion Athletic Conference
- Athletic director: Brandon Elliott
- Location: Virginia Beach, Virginia
- Varsity teams: 22
- Basketball arena: TowneBank Arena, Jane P. Batten Student Center (Basketball and Volleyball)
- Baseball stadium: Kenneth R. Perry Field
- Softball stadium: TowneBank Park (Tom & Betty Broyles Field)
- Soccer stadium: Foster Field, John Trinder Center
- Aquatics center: Natatorium, Jane P. Batten Student Center
- Lacrosse field: Birdsong Field (Lacrosse and Field Hockey)
- Tennis venue: Everett Tennis Center
- Track and Field center: Betty S. Rogers Track and Field
- Other venues: Founders Field (Recreation)
- Colors: Dark Blue, Grey/Silver, and Coastal Blue
- Mascot: Bob Marlin
- Fight song: On, Virginia Wesleyan!
- Website: battenathletics.com

The Batten Marlins (formerly the Virginia Wesleyan Marlins) are the collegiate athletic teams that represent Batten University in Virginia Beach, Virginia. The university plays in the Old Dominion Athletic Conference (ODAC) and is a member of the National Collegiate Athletic Association (NCAA) Division III.

Men's sports include baseball, basketball, cross country, golf, lacrosse, soccer, swimming, indoor/outdoor track and field, and tennis. Women's sports include basketball, cross country, field hockey, golf, lacrosse, soccer, softball, swimming, tennis, indoor/outdoor track and field, and volleyball.

The university maintains an Athletic Hall of Fame honoring those who have made lasting contributions to Batten's intercollegiate athletic program through outstanding achievements or service.

== History ==
In recent years, Virginia Wesleyan University has earned recognition as one of the top NCAA Division III programs in the country. The men's basketball team won the national championship in 2006, and the following year returned to the championship game, which they lost. The women's soccer team made it to the final four in 2006 after winning the ODAC tournament for the first time in program history. In 2016, Evan Cox was the Individual NCAA National Champion for Men's Golf. The Virginia Wesleyan softball team won the 2017 NCAA Division III National Championship with a record 54 wins. Head Coach Brandon Elliott was named ODAC Coach of the Year and State Coach of the Year, while his coaching staff earned Regional and National Coaching Staff of the Year honors. Freshman pitcher Hanna Hull earned 2017 Schutt Sports/NFCA Division III National Freshman of the Year and honors as the first National Player of the Year in program history. In 2018, they repeated as NCAA Division III champions. Hull was again named National Player of the Year, and Elliott's staff again earned National Coaching Staff of the Year honors. Despite a 42–6 overall record, and number one regular season rating in the NFCA Division III poll, the Marlins lost to the University of Lynchburg in the 2019 NCAA Regional Finals. In 2021, the VWU Softball team won its third national title in four (complete) season defeating the Texas Lutheran University in the NCAA Division III Championship best of three series with the Marlins claiming a 9–1 win in five innings in the deciding third game.

Virginia Wesleyan University added a co-ed club Esports program that offered students the chance to participate in video game competitions at the collegiate level in fall 2019. VWU is a member of the National Association of Collegiate Esports (NACE) and will begin competing with local and national teams in January 2020. The Marlin Esports Arena in the Jane P. Batten Student Center is equipped with 17 high-end gaming PCs.

The Virginia Wesleyan Softball team returned to the national stage again in 2021, following a 2020 season that was abruptly ended by COVID-19, to win the NCAA Division III Softball National Championship, the programs third in four (complete) seasons. Graduate student Hanna Hull and fifth-year senior Jessica Goldyn were named the 2021 Schutt Sports/NFCA Division III Pitcher and Player of the Year respectively after helping lead the team through the Regional and National Tournaments.

In 2024, through a contract with the City of Virginia Beach, VWU added the new indoor track facility at the Virginia Beach Convention Center as its home site. The 2024 NCAA Division III National Indoor Track and Field Championship was hosted there. The University and Virginia Beach were awarded the 2028 hosting of the same event.

In 2025, they announced the addition of women’s flag football.

=== Varsity teams ===
Men's sports	Women's sports
Baseball	Basketball
Basketball	Cross country
Cross country	Esports
Esports	Field hockey
Golf	Golf
Lacrosse	Lacrosse
Soccer	Soccer
Swimming	Softball
Tennis	Swimming
Track and field	Tennis
Volleyball	Track and field
	Volleyball

=== Facilities ===
Venue	Sport(s)
Kenneth R. Perry Field	Baseball
TowneBank Arena	Basketball; Volleyball
Foster Field	Soccer
Birdsong Field	Field Hockey; Lacrosse
TowneBank Park	Softball
Betty S. Rogers Track and Field	Track and Field
VWU Natatorium	Swimming
Everett Center	Tennis
Marlin Esports Arena	Esports
Founders Field	(recreation)

== Championships ==
=== Conference championships ===
Old Dominion Athletic Conference titles include:

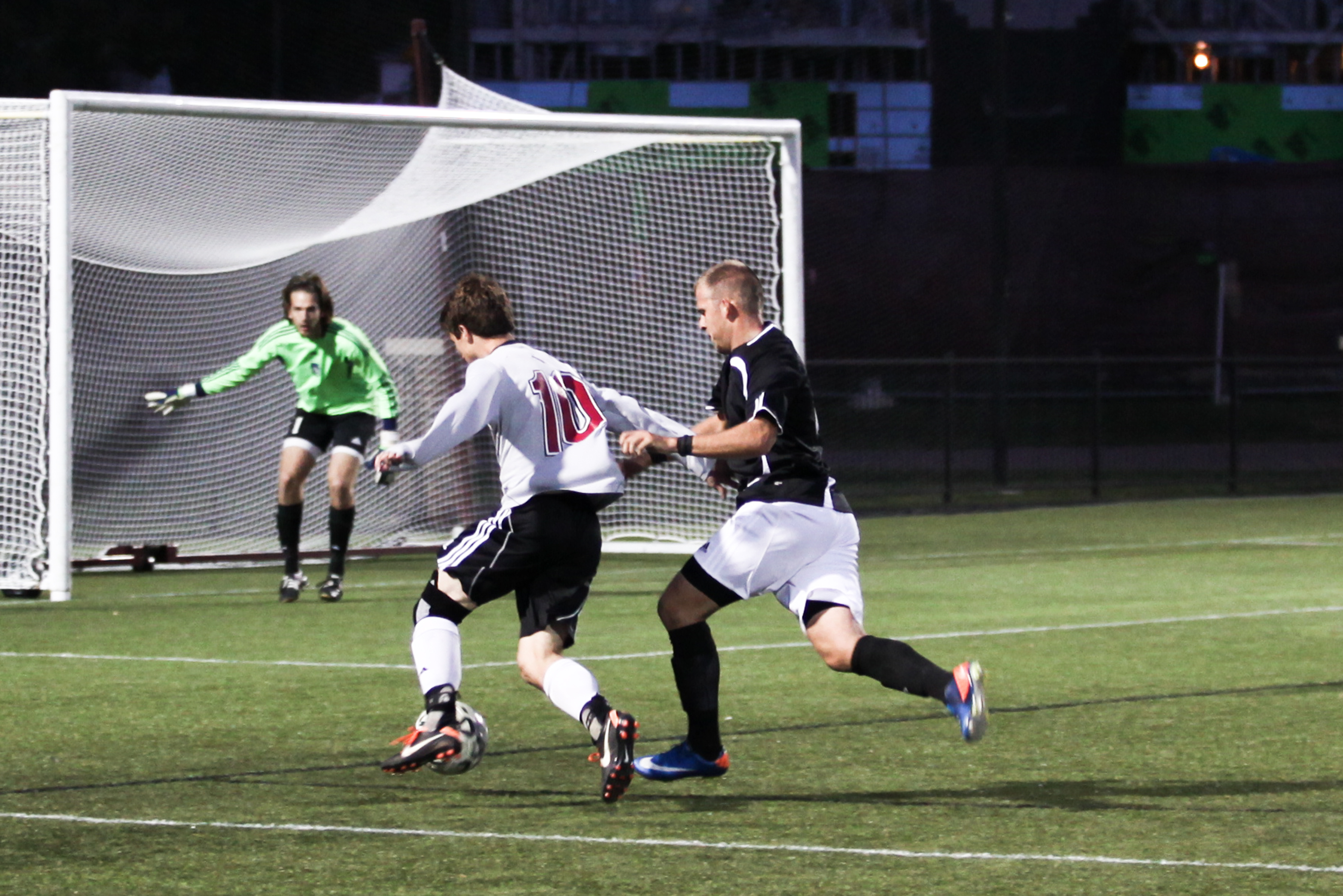
VWU (dark jersey) v Roanoke (men's soccer) in 2011

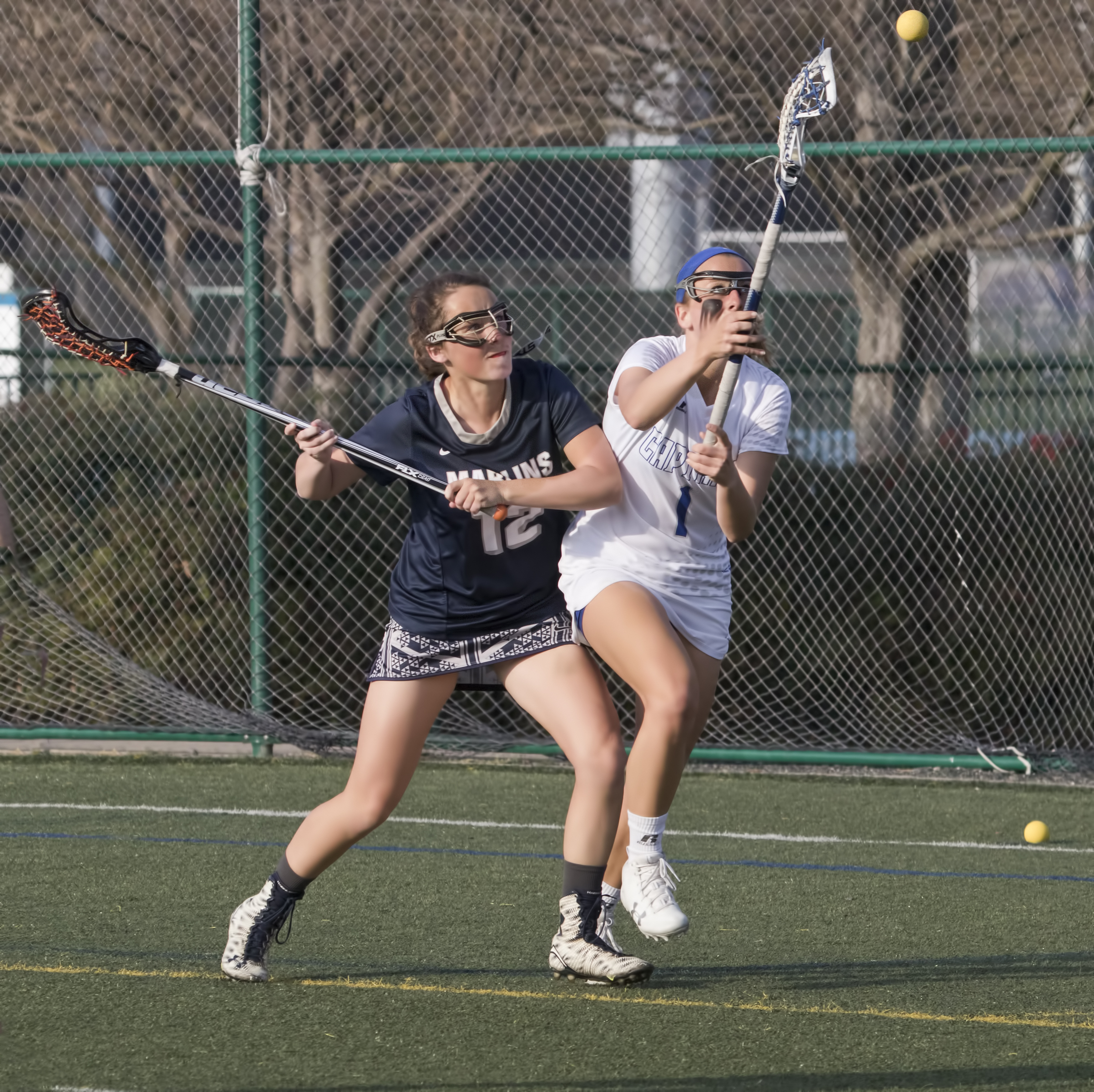
The Marlins v CNU (women's lacrosse) in 2017

Sport	Titles	Winning years
Baseball	6	1997, 1998, 2000, 2003, 2004, 2006
Basketball (m)	6	1993, 2005, 2006, 2009, 2012, 2014
Basketball (w)	1	2015
Field hockey	1	2004
Soccer (m)	10	1990, 1991, 1992, 1995, 1997, 1999, 2003, 2005, 2008, 2013
Soccer (w)	2	2006, 2021
Softball	14	1991, 1992, 1993, 1997, 1998, 2011, 2013, 2014, 2016, 2017, 2018, 2019, 2021, 2022
Volleyball (w)	1	2019

=== NCAA national championships ===
National Collegiate Athletic Association titles include:

Sport tournament	Titles	Winning years	Individual athlete	Ref.
Basketball (m)	1	2006	–	
Golf (m)	1	2016	Evan Cox	
Softball	3	2017, 2018, 2021	–	
