= Randolph–Macon Yellow Jackets =

- University: Randolph–Macon College
- Nickname: Yellow Jacket
- NCAA: Division III
- Conference: Old Dominion Athletic Conference
- Athletic director: Jeff Burns
- Location: Ashland, Virginia
- Varsity teams: 18
- Football stadium: Day Field
- Basketball arena: Crenshaw Gymnasium
- Baseball stadium: Hugh Stephens Field at Estes Park
- Soccer stadium: Nunnally Field
- Other venues: Estes Aquatic Center, Carol Estes Park
- Colors: Lemon and black
- Website: rmcathletics.com

The Randolph–Macon Yellow Jackets are the athletic teams that represent Randolph–Macon College, located in Ashland, Virginia, in NCAA Division III intercollegiate sports. The Yellow Jackets compete as members of the Old Dominion Athletic Conference. Altogether, Randolph–Macon sponsors 18 sports, with 9 teams for each gender. The school's newest sport of men's volleyball, introduced for the 2019 season (2018–19 school year), is the only team that did not compete in the ODAC, instead competing in the Continental Volleyball Conference until the 2025 season when the ODAC began sponsoring men's volleyball.

== History ==
The school's main rival in men's sports over the past century has been Hampden–Sydney College. The football game between Randolph–Macon and Hampden–Sydney dates to the 19th century and is billed as the "Oldest Small-College Rivalry in the South". Randolph–Macon won the first contest 12–6 in 1893. Other rivals include Roanoke, Virginia Wesleyan, and Washington & Lee. Randolph–Macon was also a founding member of the Virginia Intercollegiate Athletic Association in 1900, and remained in the organization until 1921, when the association dissolved.

On November 24, 2020, the 1984 football victory over Hampden–Sydney was voted the greatest football game in the history of Randolph–Macon dating back to 1891. In this game, Randolph–Macon's defense forced five turnovers which allowed the explosive and record breaking offense to score 31 points in a 31–10 victory. This allowed Randolph–Macon to advance to the NCAA playoffs for the first time in the school's history finishing the regular season ranked #5 in the NCAA and #1 in the NCAA South Region. During this historic season, Randolph Macon wide receiver Keith Gilliam had an NCAA record of nine consecutive receptions for touchdowns.

On March 19, 2022, Randolph–Macon won its first national title in the school's history as the men's basketball team soundly defeated Elmhurst College, 75–45. The Yellow Jackets set a school record for wins and finished with a 33–1 record, including a 19–0 finish in ODAC conference play.

The college maintains a Hall of Fame of former especially accomplished athletes based upon their past athletic records.

== Varsity teams ==
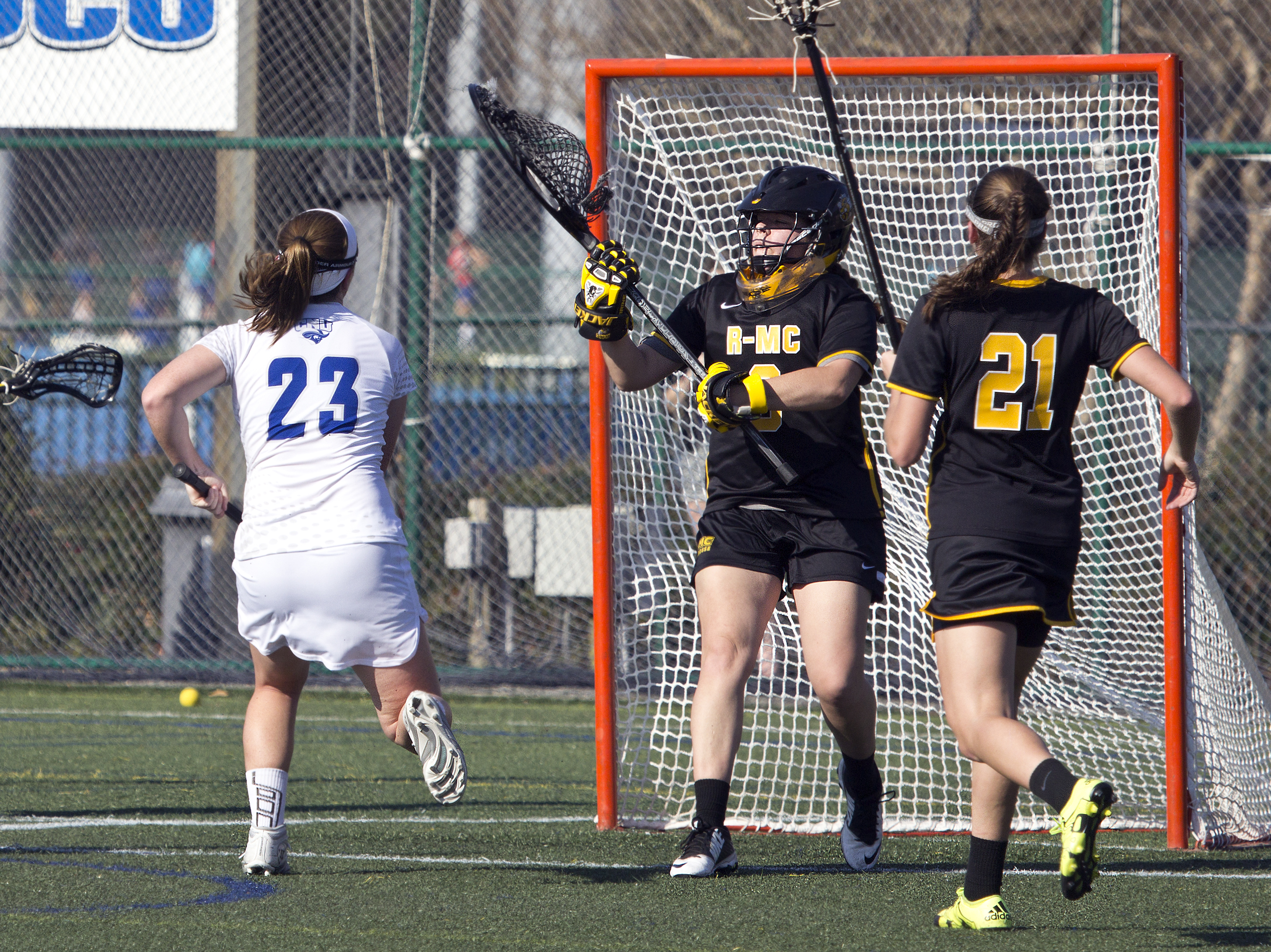
Two Yellow Jackets women's lacrosse players in a match against the Christopher Newport University Captains, 2015

Men's sports	Women's sports
Baseball	Basketball
Basketball	Field hockey
Football	Golf
Golf	Lacrosse
Lacrosse	Soccer
Soccer	Softball
Swimming	Swimming
Tennis	Tennis
Volleyball	Volleyball

== Individual teams ==
=== Baseball ===
The school's baseball team have won the ODAC championship in 1979, 1987, 2008, 2011, 2013 and 2016. In the 2016 season, R–MC reached the Mideast Regional title game. The Yellow Jackets won the South Regional Championship in 2018 and made their first appearance at the College World Series in Appleton, Wisconsin.

=== Men's Basketball ===
The men's basketball team has a long tradition of success. They have been ranked #1 in the country by D3hoops.com on multiple occasions, most recently in the 2022–23 season, and earned a trip to the Final Four of the NCAA Division III tournament in 2010. The men's basketball program has made 24 NCAA tournament appearances and won two national championships, although in two different forms, in consecutive years. The NCAA did not hold a tournament in the truncated 2020–21 basketball season because an insufficient number of schools in Division III played the season. The program was ranked No. 1 in D3sports.com's polls when they agreed to play No. 2 Trine University Thunder in an organised pre-2014 college football-style national championship game to determine the mythical national championship. The Yellow Jackets won the game and earning the top spot in the poll, 69–55. The following season, the Yellow Jackets compiled a record of 33–1 and won the 2022 NCAA Division III Tournament, defeating 16th ranked Elmhurst 75–45 in the final to claim a legitimate championship. All-American Buzz Anthony earned the tournament's Most Outstanding Player award.

=== Women's Basketball ===
The Randolph–Macon women's basketball team has had numerous successful seasons. In total, the women's basketball team has appeared in 14 NCAA tournaments with their most recent appearance being in 2026. They played in the 2005 NCAA Division III Women's Basketball National Championship game losing to Millikin University 50-70 and finishing second in Division III. Megan Silva won both the Jostens Trophy and the Division III National Player of the Year in 2006.

=== Football ===
In 1969 Randolph–Macon defeated the University of Bridgeport (Connecticut) 47–28 in the inaugural Knute Rockne Bowl laying claim to a shared College Division II National Championship with Wittenberg University (Springfield, Ohio) which had defeated William Jewell College in the first Amos Alonzo Stagg Bowl. The 4 teams had been chosen by the NCAA to compete in the first ever playoffs established for Division II schools. No complete playoff was set up until 1973. The 1969 football team was inducted into the college's Hall of Fame in 2004. The 1968 team with a perfect 9–0 record remains the only undefeated and untied football team in school history. The Yellow Jacket football team is currently coached by Pedro Arruza and won the ODAC championship in 2007, 2008, 2016, 2018, 2020, 2021, 2022 and 2023.

On November 24, 2020, the 1984 football victory over Hampden Sydney was voted the greatest football game in the history of Randolph Macon dating back to 1891. In this game, Randolph Macon's defense forced five turnovers which allowed the explosive and record breaking offense to score 31 points in a 31–10 victory. This win allowed Randolph–Macon to advance to the NCAA playoffs for the first time in the school's history finishing the regular season ranked #5 in the nation and #1 in the NCAA South Region. During the historic 1984 season, Randolph Macon wide receiver Keith Gilliam broke the all-time NCAA record by having nine consecutive receptions for touchdowns.

As of November 2013 the football team had posted a record seven seasons with a winning record under Coach Arruza. The football team plays its home games at Day Field.

Year	Round	Opponent	Result
1984	First Round	Washington & Jefferson	L, 21–22
2008	First Round	Mount Union	L, 0–56
2016	First Round	Johns Hopkins	L, 21–42
2018	First Round; Second Round	John Carroll; Muhlenberg	W, 23–20; L, 6–35
2022	First Round; Second Round	Cortland; Delaware Valley	W, 35–28; L, 32–39
2023	First Round; Second Round; Quarterfinals; Semifinals	Christopher Newport; Ithaca; Johns Hopkins; Cortland	W, 28–20; W, 46–0; W, 39–36; L, 14–49
Playoff record			5–6

=== Women's Volleyball ===
R–MC won its seventh ODAC title and made its ninth NCAA appearance in 2022. In 2015 the team made an appearance in the National Quarterfinals.

=== Softball ===
The Yellow Jackets softball team is an NCAA Division III team with an outstanding home record at Carol Estes Park of 302-156-1 as of the 2024 season.

R-MC has won two Old Dominion Athletic Conference Championships in 2015 and 2023. They have posted two 42 win seasons in 2023 and 2025. The Yellow Jackets advanced to the NCAA Division III softball tournament Double Elimination Finals in 2025.
