= Old Dominion Athletic Conference =

NCAA Division III athletic conference in the southeast US

- Formerly: Virginia College Conference
- Association: NCAA
- Founded: 1975
- Commissioner: Brad Bankston
- Sports fielded: 26; men's: 13; women's: 13
- Division: Division III
- No. of teams: 14 full, 4 associates
- Headquarters: Forest, Virginia, U.S.
- Region: South Atlantic
- Website: odaconline.com

Locations
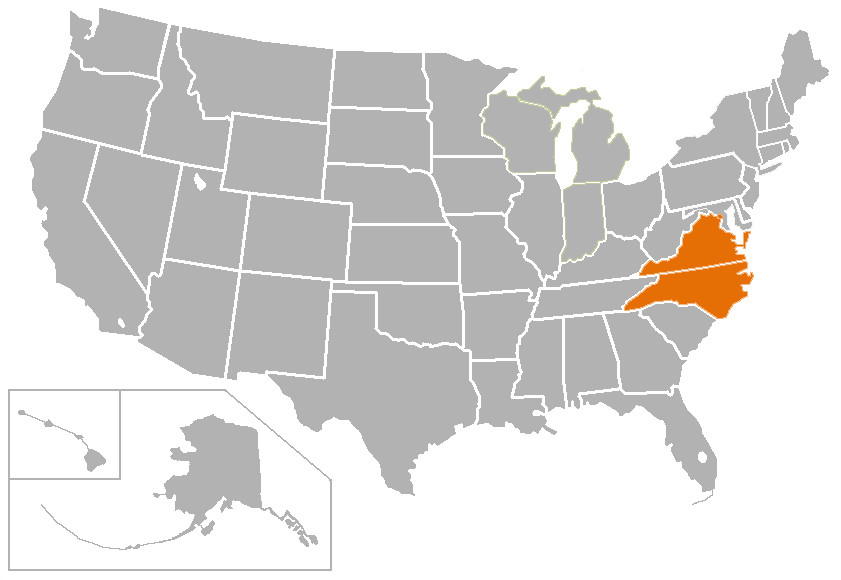

The Old Dominion Athletic Conference (ODAC) is an intercollegiate athletic conference that competes in the National Collegiate Athletic Association (NCAA) Division III. Of its 14 full member schools, all but one are located in Virginia; the other is in North Carolina. The conference also has four associate members: one in Virginia, one in North Carolina, one in Tennessee, and one in Georgia. The ODAC is unique in that its membership includes co-ed colleges, women's colleges, and a men's college.

== History ==
Old Dominion Athletic Conference
Location of ODAC members:
full member
associate member

ODAC logo from 1976 to 2010

The conference was founded in May 1975 as the Virginia College Conference. On January 1, 1976, the name was changed to the Old Dominion Athletic Conference. The 1976–77 season was the first in which championships were offered. In 1980, Maryville College joined and became the first member outside of Virginia. In 1981, Catholic University joined the conference after leaving Division I's ECAC South Conference. In 1982–83, women's sports were added, and Hollins College (now university), Randolph–Macon Woman's College (now Randolph College), and Sweet Briar College all joined. Mary Baldwin College (now university) joined in 1984. In 1988, Maryville left and was replaced by Virginia Wesleyan College (now Batten University). In 1989 Catholic left the conference to become a charter member of the Capital Athletic Conference, returning in 1999 as a football-only member. They were replaced by Guilford College two years later. The next school to leave the conference was Mary Baldwin, which left in 1992.

In 2010 the ODAC announced the addition of Shenandoah University as a full-time member, with its first full year of involvement during the 2012–13 academic year.

The league office moved its physical location from Salem, to Forest in eastern Bedford County located just outside centrally located Lynchburg, Virginia. They also contracted Jim Ward Design for its new marks.

On March 3, 2015, Sweet Briar College announced it was to close (cease operations) at the end of the 2015 summer session. However, on June 20, 2015, the Virginia Attorney General announced a mediation agreement that kept Sweet Briar College open for the 2015–16 academic year. Sweet Briar reactivated its sports teams in the 2015–16 season and remained a full member of the ODAC.

On September 29, 2015, it was announced that Catholic University would withdraw in 2017 as associate member to join the new football league at the New England Women's and Men's Athletic Conference.

In June 2017, it was announced that Ferrum College would become the 15th full-time member of the Old Dominion Athletic Conference after it moved from the USA South Conference.

Southern Virginia University, which joined the ODAC as a football only member in 2019, announced in December of that year that it was leaving both the ODAC and Coast to Coast Athletic Conference to join the football-sponsoring USA South Athletic Conference as a full member.

The conference has hosted Division III championships in football and men's basketball, both of which were held in Salem, Virginia. D-III softball has also used Salem as a championship host along with Division III women's lacrosse and volleyball on several occasions. Since 1993 - the conference and city have hosted over 80 Division III national championships.

It was announced on November 17, 2020, that Emory & Henry College, later a university, would leave the ODAC and begin its transition to Division II in July 2021 and compete in the South Atlantic Conference in 2022.

The most recent change in conference membership was announced on March 8, 2021, that Averett University would leave the USA South and join its former USA South counterpart Ferrum College in the ODAC as a full member in 2022.

On September 18, 2023, the ODAC announced that it would add men's volleyball as a sponsored championship sport, beginning the 2025 fall season of 2024–25 academic year, initially with seven full members. At the time of announcement, Eastern Mennonite, Randolph–Macon, and Roanoke had established programs; Averett and Virginia Wesleyan were preparing to play their first varsity seasons in 2024; and Lynchburg and Randolph had committed to starting varsity play in 2025.

On July 3, 2024, Gallaudet University announced that it would join the ODAC as an associate member for football for the 2025 fall season of the 2025–26 academic year.

=== Chronological timeline ===
- 1975 – The ODAC was founded as the Virginia Athletic Conference. Charter members included Bridgewater College, Eastern Mennonite College (now Eastern Mennonite University), Emory & Henry College (now Emory & Henry University), Hampden–Sydney College, Lynchburg College (now the University of Lynchburg), Randolph–Macon College, Roanoke College and Washington and Lee University. However, it was renamed to become the Old Dominion Athletic Conference on 1 January 1976, beginning the 1976–77 academic year, their first year of competition.
- 1980 – Maryville College joined the ODAC in the 1980–81 academic year.
- 1981 – Catholic University joined the ODAC in the 1981–82 academic year.
- 1982 – Women's sports were instated in the ODAC, also three women's sports institutions of Hollins College (now Hollins University), Randolph–Macon Woman's College (now Randolph College) and Sweet Briar College joined the ODAC in the 1982–83 academic year.
- 1984 – Mary Baldwin College (now Mary Baldwin University) joined the ODAC in the 1984–85 academic year.
- 1988 – Maryville left the ODAC after the 1987–88 academic year.
- 1989:
  - Catholic (D.C.) left the ODAC to join the Capital Athletic Conference (now the Coast to Coast Athletic Conference or C2C) after the 1988–89 academic year.
  - Virginia Wesleyan College (now Batten University) joined the ODAC in the 1989–90 academic year.
- 1991 – Guilford College joined the ODAC in the 1991–92 academic year.
- 1992 – Mary Baldwin left the ODAC after the 1991–92 academic year.
- 1999 – Catholic (D.C.) rejoined the ODAC as an associate member for football in the 1999 fall season (1999–2000 academic year).
- 2011 – Greensboro College and Notre Dame of Maryland University joined the ODAC as associate members for women's swimming in the 2011–12 academic year.
- 2012 – Shenandoah University joined the ODAC in the 2012–13 academic year.
- 2015 – Ferrum College joined the ODAC as an associate member for men's and women's swimming in the 2015–16 academic year.
- 2016 – Notre Dame (Md.) left the ODAC as an associate member for women's swimming by discontinuing the sport after the 2015–16 academic year.
- 2017 – Catholic (D.C.) left the ODAC as an associate member for football after the 2016 fall season (2016–17 academic year).
- 2018 – Ferrum upgraded to join the ODAC for all sports in the 2018–19 academic year.
- 2019 – Southern Virginia University joined the ODAC as an associate member for football in the 2019 fall season (2019–20 academic year).
- 2021:
  - Southern Virginia left the ODAC as an associate member for football after the 2020 fall season (2020–21 academic year).
  - Emory & Henry left the ODAC to join the Division II ranks of the National Collegiate Athletic Association (NCAA) by becoming an NCAA D-II Independent (which would later join the South Atlantic Conference (SAC) in 2022–23) after the 2020–21 academic year.
  - Averett University joined the ODAC in the 2022–23 academic year.
- 2022 – Southern Virginia and Greensboro joined as associate members in men's wrestling in the 2022–23 academic year.
- 2023 – The ODAC added men's volleyball for the 2025 spring season (2024–25 academic year), initially with seven full members. At the time of announcement, Eastern Mennonite, Randolph–Macon, and Roanoke had established programs; Averett and Virginia Wesleyan were preparing to play their first varsity seasons in 2024; and Lynchburg and Randolph had committed to starting varsity play in 2025.
- 2025:
  - Ferrum left the ODAC to join the NCAA Division II ranks and the Conference Carolinas (CC) after the 2024–25 academic year.
  - Gallaudet University joined the ODAC as an associate member for football in the 2025 fall season (2025–26 academic year).
- 2026 – Gallaudet left the ODAC as an associate member for football after the 2025 fall season (2025–26 academic year).

== Member schools ==
=== Current members ===
The ODAC currently has 14 full members, all are private schools:

Institution	Location	Founded	Affiliation	Enrollment	Nickname	Colors	Joined (Note: Represents the calendar year when fall sports competition begins.)	Football?
Averett University	Danville, Virginia	1859	Nonsectarian	2,719	Cougars		2022	Yes
Batten University (Note: Was known as Virginia Wesleyan University until 2026.)	Virginia Beach, Virginia	1961	United Methodist	1,446	Marlins		1989	No
Bridgewater College	Bridgewater, Virginia	1880	Church of the Brethren	1,800	Eagles		1976	Yes
Eastern Mennonite University	Harrisonburg, Virginia	1917	Mennonite	998	Royals		1976	No
Guilford College	Greensboro, North Carolina	1837	Quaker	2,682	Quakers		1991	Yes
Hampden–Sydney College (Note: This institution is a men's college, therefore it does not compete in women's sports.)	Hampden Sydney, Virginia	1775	Presbyterian	1,120	Tigers		1976	Yes
Hollins University (Note: This institution is a women's college, therefore it does not compete in men's sports.)	Roanoke, Virginia	1842	Nonsectarian	816	N/A (Note: Hollins University does not have an official athletic nickname.)		1982	No
University of Lynchburg	Lynchburg, Virginia	1903	Disciples of Christ	2,500	Hornets		1976	No
Randolph College (Note: This institution is a former women's college, which has eventually turned into a co-educational college (Randolph since 2007–08).) (Note: Formerly known as Randolph–Macon Woman's College until 2007.)	Lynchburg, Virginia	1891	United Methodist	522	WildCats		1982	No
Randolph–Macon College	Ashland, Virginia	1830	United Methodist	1,146	Yellow Jackets		1976	Yes
Roanoke College	Salem, Virginia	1842	Lutheran ELCA	1,920	Maroons		1976	Yes
Shenandoah University	Winchester, Virginia	1875	United Methodist	2,800	Hornets		2012	Yes
Sweet Briar College (Note: Non-basketball member.)	Sweet Briar, Virginia	1901	Nonsectarian	530	Vixens		1982	No
Washington and Lee University	Lexington, Virginia	1749	Nonsectarian	2,200	Generals		1976	Yes

=== Associate members ===
The ODAC currently has four associate members, all are private schools:

Institution	Location	Founded	Affiliation	Enrollment	Nickname	Joined (Note: Represents the calendar year when fall sports competition begins.)	ODAC sport(s)	Primary conference
Berry College	Rome, Georgia	1902	Non-denominational	2,254	Vikings	2022	Equestrian	Southern (SAA)
Greensboro College	Greensboro, North Carolina	1838	United Methodist	1,250	Pride	2011, 2022	Women's swimming, Men's wrestling	USA South
Sewanee: The University of the South	Sewanee, Tennessee	1857	Episcopal	1,695	Tigers	2023	Equestrian	Southern (SAA)
Southern Virginia University (Note: Southern Virginia competed in the ODAC as an associate member for football from the 2019 to 2020 fall seasons (2019–20 to 2020–21 school years).)	Buena Vista, Virginia	1867	LDS Church	1,106	Knights	2022	Men's wrestling	USA South

=== Former members ===
The ODAC had five former full members, all were private schools:

Institution	Location	Founded	Affiliation	Enrollment	Nickname	Joined (Note: Represents the calendar year when fall sports competition begins.)	Left (Note: Represents the calendar year when spring sports competition ends.)	Current conference
The Catholic University of America	Washington, D.C.	1887	Catholic (Pontifical)	3,469	Cardinals	1981	1989 (Note: Catholic (D.C.) would later rejoin the ODAC as an associate member for football from the 1999 to 2016 fall seasons (1999–2000 to 2016–17 school years).)	Landmark
Emory & Henry College (Note: Currently known as Emory & Henry University since 2024.)	Emory, Virginia	1836	United Methodist	1,000	Wasps	1976	2021	South Atlantic (SAC) (Note: Currently an NCAA Division II athletic conference.)
Ferrum College	Ferrum, Virginia	1913	United Methodist	1,500	Panthers	2018 (Note: Ferrum competed in the ODAC as an associate member for men's and women's swimming from 2015–16 to 2017–18.)	2025	Carolinas (CC)
Maryville College	Maryville, Tennessee	1819	Presbyterian (PCUSA)	1,176	Scots	1980	1988	Southern (SAA)
Mary Baldwin College (Note: Mary Baldwin was formerly a women's college, therefore it did not offer men's sports during the school's tenure within the conference; but eventually became co-ed since the 2017–18 school year.) (Note: Currently known as Mary Baldwin University since 2016.)	Staunton, Virginia	1842	Presbyterian (PCUSA)	2,542	Fighting Squirrels	1984	1992	USA South

=== Former associate members ===
The ODAC had three former associate members, all were private schools:

Institution	Location	Founded	Affiliation	Enrollment	Nickname	Joined (Note: Represents the calendar year when fall sports competition begins.)	Left (Note: Represents the calendar year when spring sports competition ends.)	ODAC sport(s)	Current primary conference
The Catholic University of America (Note: Catholic (D.C.) was a full member of the ODAC from 1981–82 to 1988–89.)	Washington, D.C.	1887	Catholic (Pontifical)	3,469	Cardinals	1999	2017	Football	Landmark (Note: After competing in the ODAC as an affiliate member, Catholic (D.C.)'s football team joined the New England Women's and Men's Athletic Conference (NEWMAC) from the 2017 to 2022 fall seasons (2017–18 to 2022–23 school years); before joining in its primary home conference in the Landmark Conference, which they still compete today for all of its other sports, since the 2023 fall season (2023–24 academic year).)
Gallaudet University	Washington, D.C.	1864	Quasigovernmental	1,740	Bison	2025	2026	Football	United East (UEC) (Note: Gallaudet joined the Southern Collegiate Athletic Conference (SCAC) as an affiliate member for football in 2026 (2026-27).)
Notre Dame of Maryland University (Note: This institution was a women's college, therefore it did not offer men's sports during the school's affiliation within the conference; but eventually became co-ed since the 2023–24 school year.)	Baltimore, Maryland	1873	Catholic (SSND)	4,878	Gators	2011	2016	Women's swimming	United East (UEC) (Note: After competing in the ODAC as an affiliate member, Notre Dame (Md.) dropped the sport after the 2015–16 school year.)
Southern Virginia University (Note: Southern Virginia remains in the ODAC as an associate member for men's wrestling.)	Buena Vista, Virginia	1867	LDS Church	1,106	Knights	2019	2021	Football	USA South

=== Membership timeline ===
This timeline is expressed with color bars.

Full member (all sports) Full member (non-football) Associate member (football) Associate member (sport)

== Sports ==
The conference sponsors championships in the following sports:

Conference sports
Sport	Men's	Women's
Baseball	✓	
Basketball	✓	✓
Cross country	✓	✓
Equestrian		✓
Field hockey		✓
Football	✓	
Golf	✓	✓
Lacrosse	✓	✓
Soccer	✓	✓
Softball		✓
Swimming	✓	✓
Tennis	✓	✓
Track and field (indoor)	✓	✓
Track and field (outdoor)	✓	✓
Volleyball	✓	✓
Wrestling	✓	
