= 2025 NCAA Division III men's basketball tournament =

American collegiate men's basketball tournament (2025)

- Teams: 64
- Finals site: Allen County War Memorial Coliseum, Fort Wayne, Indiana
- Champions: Trinity (CT) (1st title, 1st title game, 3rd Final Four)
- Runner-up: NYU (2nd title game, 2nd Final Four)
- Semifinalists: Wesleyan (CT) (1st Final Four); Washington–St. Louis (4th Final Four)
- Winning coach: James Cosgrove (1st title)
- MOP: Henry Vetter (Trinity (CT))

The 2025 NCAA Division III men's basketball tournament was a single-elimination tournament to determine the national champion of men's NCAA Division III college basketball in the United States, the culmination of the 2024–25 NCAA Division III men's basketball season.

The tournament again featured sixty-four teams, with teams placed into one of four sixteen-team regionals. The first four rounds were played on campus sites while the national and semifinal championship rounds were held at the Allen County War Memorial Coliseum in Fort Wayne, Indiana from March 20–22, 2025.

Trinity (CT) won their first national championship, defeating NYU 64–60. Trinity were the seventh consecutive first-time national champion, a streak dating back to Babson in 2017. Four teams made their NCAA Division III tournament debut: Bryn Athyn, Drew, Huntingdon, and Pfeiffer.

== Tournament schedule and venues ==
2025 first and second round host sites

First and second rounds

First- and second-round games were played at campus sites on March 7 and March 8.

On the basis of team strength and geography, these locations were chosen to host first- and second-round games in the 2025 tournament:

- Silloway Gymnasium, Middletown, Connecticut (Host: Wesleyan University)
- Harrington Auditorium, Worcester, Massachusetts (Host: Worcester Polytechnic Institute)
- Woodruff Physical Education Center, Atlanta, Georgia (Host: Emory University)
- Bradley Center, Mahwah, New Jersey (Host: Ramapo College)
- Ray Oosting Gymnasium, Hartford, Connecticut (Host: Trinity College)
- Panzer Athletic Center, Montclair, New Jersey (Host: Montclair State University)
- Mayser Center, Lancaster, Pennsylvania (Host: Franklin & Marshall College)
- Freeman Center, Newport News, Virginia (Host: Christopher Newport University)
- Wolf Gymnasium, York, Pennsylvania (Host: York College of Pennsylvania)
- Jerabeck Activity and Athletic Center, Houston, Texas (Host: University of St. Thomas)
- Cousens Gymnasium, Medford, Massachusetts (Host: Tufts University)
- Kirby Field House, Hampden Sydney, Virginia (Host: Hampden–Sydney College)
- Williams Fieldhouse, Platteville, Wisconsin (Host: University of Wisconsin–Platteville)
- Washington University Field House, St. Louis, Missouri (Host: Washington University in St. Louis)
- Mitchell Hall, La Crosse, Wisconsin (Host: University of Wisconsin–La Crosse)
- Ratner Athletics Center, Chicago, Illinois (Host: University of Chicago)

Third and fourth rounds

2025 third and fourth round (blue) and Final Four (red) host sites

Third- and fourth-round games were played at campus sites on March 14 and March 15.

At the conclusion of the second round, the NCAA announced the following locations would host third- and fourth-round games.

- Silloway Gymnasium, Middletown, Connecticut (Host: Wesleyan University)
- Ray Oosting Gymnasium, Hartford, Connecticut (Host: Trinity College)
- John A. Paulson Center, New York, New York (Host: New York University)
- Mitchell Hall, La Crosse, Wisconsin (Host: University of Wisconsin–La Crosse)

National Semifinals and Championship

The National Semifinals and Championship were played on March 20 and March 22.

- Allen County War Memorial Coliseum, Fort Wayne, Indiana (Host: Manchester University)

Fort Wayne hosted the Final Four for the fifth time, having previously hosted in 2019, 2022, 2023, and 2024. Fort Wayne was also scheduled to host the Final Four in 2020 and 2021, before those editions of the tournament were canceled due to COVID-19 concerns.

== Qualifying teams ==
A total of sixty-four bids were available for the tournament: 43 automatic bids—awarded to the champions of the forty-three NCAA-recognized Division III conference tournaments—and 21 at-large bids.

There will be a net increase of one automatic bid this year, due to the Collegiate Conference of the South getting an automatic bid.

=== Automatic bids (43) ===
The following 43 teams were automatic qualifiers for the 2025 NCAA field by virtue of winning their conference's automatic bid (except for the UAA, whose regular-season champion received the automatic bid).

Automatic bids
Conference	Team	Record (Conf.)	Appearance	Last bid
Allegheny Mountain	Pittsburgh–Bradford	23–3 (14–2)	3rd	2003
American Rivers	Central (IA)	17–11 (9–7)	12th	2016
American Southwest	Hardin–Simmons	18–9 (8–0)	3rd	2017
Atlantic East	Neumann	20–7 (9–3)	4th	2022
Centennial	Franklin & Marshall	21–6 (11–2)	26th	2018
CUNYAC	John Jay	19–8 (11–3)	2nd	2008
Coast to Coast	Mary Washington	13–14 (3–2)	4th	2023
CCIW	Illinois Wesleyan	22–5 (12–4)	27th	2022
CCS	Huntingdon	22–6 (8–4)	1st	Never
CNE	Western New England	21–6 (15–3)	4th	2001
Empire 8	Utica	21–7 (12–4)	4th	2024
Great Northeast	St. Joseph's (ME)	24–4 (14–1)	3rd	2009
Heartland	Franklin	21–7 (14–4)	7th	2022
Landmark	Drew	24–3 (18–0)	1st	Never
Liberty	Ithaca	18–9 (13–5)	12th	2020
Little East	Keene State	22–5 (14–2)	10th	2024
MAC Commonwealth	York (PA)	21–6 (12–2)	8th	2020
MAC Freedom	Delaware Valley	15–12 (8–6)	4th	2016
MASCAC	Westfield State	21–6 (9–3)	6th	2022
Michigan	Calvin	21–6 (14–0)	24th	2024
Midwest	Grinnell	20–7 (11–5)	3rd	2001
Minnesota	St. John's (MN)	24–3 (15–1)	13th	2022
NESCAC	Trinity (CT)	24–3 (8–2)	11th	2024
NEWMAC	Clark (MA)	18–9 (12–4)	17th	2010
New Jersey	Montclair State	21–6 (14–4)	8th	2023
North Atlantic	Husson	21–7 (12–1)	10th	2024
North Coast	Denison	24–3 (14–2)	3rd	2016
Northern Athletics	St. Norbert	22–6 (15–3)	11th	2023
Northwest	Lewis & Clark	15–12 (9–7)	4th	2002
Ohio	John Carroll	22–5 (15–3)	18th	2024
Old Dominion	Guilford	22–6 (12–4)	8th	2024
Presidents'	Chatham	23–4 (18–2)	3rd	2023
Skyline	Yeshiva	18–10 (12–4)	4th	2022
Southern	Berry	19–8 (10–2)	4th	2024
SCIAC	Claremont–Mudd–Scripps	20–7 (12–4)	16th	2024
SCAC	St. Thomas (TX)	25–2 (15–1)	3rd	2024
SLIAC	Greenville	20–7 (16–2)	2nd	2018
SUNYAC	SUNY Cortland	17–11 (13–5)	7th	2016
United East	Bryn Athyn	20–8 (15–1)	1st	Never
UAA	NYU	24–1 (13–1)	13th	2024
Upper Midwest	Bethany Lutheran	14–13 (9–5)	5th	2024
USA South	Pfeiffer	18–7 (12–2)	1st	Never
Wisconsin	UW–Platteville	25–2 (13–1)	16th	2024

=== At-large bids (21) ===
The following 21 teams were awarded qualification for the tournament field by the NCAA's NPI rankings, a computer ranking system that evaluates teams' winning percentage, strength of schedule, home-away bonus, quality wins, and overtime results.

At-large bids
Conference	Team	Record (Conf.)	Appearance	Last bid
SCIAC	Cal Lutheran	22–5 (14–2)	7th	2024
CCIW	Carthage	21–6 (14–2)	5th	2010
Landmark	Catholic	22–5 (16–2)	16th	2024
UAA	Chicago	18–7 (9–5)	7th	2008
Coast to Coast	Christopher Newport	22–5 (5–0)	28th	2024
UAA	Emory	20–5 (10–4)	12th	2023
Centennial	Gettysburg	20–7 (10–3)	6th	2009
NESCAC	Hamilton	20–6 (7–3)	13th	2023
Old Dominion	Hampden–Sydney	21–5 (14–2)	17th	2024
New Jersey	Ramapo	20–7 (13–5)	10th	2019
Old Dominion	Randolph–Macon	23–4 (15–1)	21st	2024
SCIAC	Redlands	22–4 (14–2)	4th	2013
Old Dominion	Roanoke	23–5 (14–2)	14th	2001
New Jersey	Stockton	19–8 (13–5)	20th	2024
New Jersey	TCNJ	20–7 (12–6)	9th	2024
NESCAC	Tufts	21–5 (8–2)	9th	2024
Wisconsin	UW–La Crosse	22–5 (12–2)	4th	2022
UAA	Washington–St. Louis	19–6 (9–5)	26th	2024
NESCAC	Wesleyan (CT)	26–1 (10–0)	5th	2022
Northern Athletics	Wisconsin Lutheran	25–3 (16–2)	3rd	2024
NEWMAC	WPI	24–3 (15–1)	15th	2022

== Tournament bracket ==
=== Top-left - Middletown, Connecticut ===
First round March 7, 2025; Campus Sites
Wesleyan (CT)	72
Delaware Valley	50
Middletown, CT
Chatham	68
Gettysburg	84
WPI	81
Husson	71
Worcester, MA
Stockton	69
Ithaca	80
Emory	83
Huntingdon	68
Atlanta, GA
Guilford	77
Berry	80
Drew	58
Mary Washington	73
Mahwah, NJ (Note: Due to Drew not applying to be a host site, this pod is hosted by Ramapo instead.)
Ramapo	89**
Claremont–Mudd–Scripps	84

Second round March 8, 2025; Campus Sites
Wesleyan (CT)	82
Gettysburg	60
WPI	79
Ithaca	71
Emory	84
Berry	68
Mary Washington	86
Ramapo	81

Sectional semifinals March 14, 2025; Middletown, CT
Wesleyan (CT)	66
WPI	50
Emory	80
Mary Washington	78

Sectional finals March 15, 2025; Middletown, CT
Wesleyan (CT)	61*
Emory	58

=== Bottom-left - Hartford, Connecticut ===
First round March 7, 2025; Campus Sites
Trinity (CT)	76
Neumann	60
Hartford, CT
Keene State	77
Clark (MA)	68
Montclair State	79
Utica	57
Montclair, NJ
Hamilton	73
Western New England	83
Randolph–Macon	82
Westfield State	48
Lancaster, PA (Note: Due to Randolph–Macon's women's team hosting first and second round games in the 2025 NCAA Division III women's basketball tournament, this pod is hosted by Franklin & Marshall instead.)
Franklin & Marshall	50
Catholic	84
Christopher Newport	101
John Jay	75
Newport News, VA
Roanoke	71
Pfeiffer	70

Second round March 8, 2025; Campus Sites
Trinity (CT)	93
Keene State	78
Montclair State	61
Western New England	79
Randolph–Macon	67
Catholic	79
Christopher Newport	75
Roanoke	77

Sectional semifinals March 14, 2025; Hartford, CT
Trinity (CT)	79
Western New England	42
Catholic	95*
Roanoke	91

Sectional finals March 15, 2025; Hartford, CT
Trinity (CT)	86
Catholic	63

=== Top-right - New York, New York ===
First round March 7, 2025; Campus Sites
NYU	72
SUNY Cortland	36
York, PA (Note: Due to NYU's women's team hosting first and second round games in the 2025 NCAA Division III women's basketball tournament, this pod is hosted by York (PA) instead.)
John Carroll	69
York (PA)	71
St. Thomas (TX)	67
Lewis & Clark	50
Houston, TX
Cal Lutheran	65
Hardin–Simmons	70
Tufts	83
Yeshiva	66
Medford, MA
St. Joseph's (ME)	79
Redlands	89
Hampden–Sydney	102
Bryn Athyn	66
Hampden Sydney, VA
TCNJ	96
Pittsburgh–Bradford	98

Second round March 8, 2025; Campus Sites
NYU	62
York (PA)	52
St. Thomas (TX)	72
Hardin–Simmons	74
Tufts	93
Redlands	95*
Hampden–Sydney	81
Pittsburgh–Bradford	75

Sectional semifinals March 14, 2025; New York, NY
NYU	91
Hardin–Simmons	59
Redlands	83
Hampden-Sydney	72

Sectional finals March 15, 2025; New York, NY
NYU	75
Redlands	65

=== Bottom-right - La Crosse, Wisconsin ===
First round March 7, 2025; Campus Sites
UW–Platteville	125
Grinnell	97
Platteville, WI
Wisconsin Lutheran	73
Calvin	61
Washington–St. Louis	82
Central (IA)	75
St. Louis, MO
Denison	64
Franklin	67*
UW–La Crosse	120
Greenville	93
La Crosse, WI
Carthage	89
St. Norbert	92
Illinois Wesleyan	101
Bethany Lutheran	67
Chicago, IL (Note: Due to Illinois Wesleyan's women's team hosting first and second round games in the 2025 NCAA Division III women's basketball tournament, this pod is hosted by Chicago instead.)
St. John's (MN)	72
Chicago	71

Second round March 8, 2025; Campus Sites
UW–Platteville	73
Wisconsin Lutheran	75*
Washington–St. Louis	83
Franklin	54
UW–La Crosse	77
St. Norbert	67
Illinois Wesleyan	75
St. John's (MN)	73

Sectional semifinals March 14, 2025; La Crosse, WI
Wisconsin Lutheran	56
Washington–St. Louis	59
UW–La Crosse	72
Illinois Wesleyan	65

Sectional finals March 15, 2025; La Crosse, WI
Washington–St. Louis	80
UW–La Crosse	66

=== Final Four ===
National semifinals March 20; Fort Wayne, IN
Wesleyan (CT)	69
Trinity (CT)	73
NYU	72
Washington–St. Louis	60

National championship March 22; Fort Wayne, IN
Trinity (CT)	64
NYU	60

== Record by conference ==
Conference	Record	Win %	R64	R32	S16	E8	F4	CG	NC
NESCAC	11–3	.786	4	3	2	2	2	1	1
UAA	12–4	.750	4	3	3	3	2	1	–
Wisconsin	4–2	.667	2	2	1	1	–	–	–
Landmark	3–2	.600	2	1	1	1	–	–	–
SCIAC	3–3	.500	3	1	1	1	–	–	–
Old Dominion	5–4	.556	4	3	2	–	–	–	–
American Southwest	2–1	.667	1	1	1	–	–	–	–
CNE	2–1	.667	1	1	1	–	–	–	–
Coast to Coast	3–2	.600	2	2	1	–	–	–	–
Northern Athletics	3–2	.600	2	2	1	–	–	–	–
CCIW	2–2	.500	2	1	1	–	–	–	–
NEWMAC	2–2	.500	2	1	1	–	–	–	–
New Jersey	2–4	.333	4	2	–	–	–	–	–
Allegheny Mountain	1–1	.500	1	1	–	–	–	–	–
Heartland	1–1	.500	1	1	–	–	–	–	–
Liberty	1–1	.500	1	1	–	–	–	–	–
Little East	1–1	.500	1	1	–	–	–	–	–
MAC Commonwealth	1–1	.500	1	1	–	–	–	–	–
Minnesota	1–1	.500	1	1	–	–	–	–	–
SAA	1–1	.500	1	1	–	–	–	–	–
SCAC	1–1	.500	1	1	–	–	–	–	–
Centennial	1–2	.333	2	1	–	–	–	–	–

- The R64, R32, S16, E8, F4, CG, and NC columns indicate how many teams from each conference were in the round of 64 (first round), round of 32 (second round), Sweet 16, Elite Eight, Final Four, championship game, and national champion, respectively.
- The American Rivers, Atlantic East, CUNYAC, CCS, Empire 8, Great Northeast, MAC Freedom, MASCAC, Michigan, Midwest, North Atlantic, North Coast, Northwest, Ohio, Presidents', Skyline, SLIAC, SUNYAC, United East, Upper Midwest, and USA South each had one representative, eliminated in the Round of 64 with a record of 0–1.

== See also ==
- 2025 NCAA Division I men's basketball tournament
- 2025 NCAA Division II men's basketball tournament
- 2025 NAIA men's basketball tournament
- 2025 NCAA Division III women's basketball tournament
