= 2024 NCAA Division III men's basketball tournament =

American collegiate men's basketball tournament (2024)

- Teams: 64
- Finals site: Allen County War Memorial Coliseum, Fort Wayne, Indiana
- Champions: Trine (1st title, 1st title game, 1st Final Four)
- Runner-up: Hampden–Sydney (2nd title game, 3rd Final Four)
- Semifinalists: Guilford (3rd Final Four); Trinity (CT) (2nd Final Four)
- Winning coach: Brooks Miller (1st title)
- MOP: Cortez Garland (Trine)

The 2024 NCAA Division III men's basketball tournament was a single-elimination tournament to determine the national champion of men's NCAA Division III college basketball in the United States, the culmination of the 2023–24 NCAA Division III men's basketball season.

The tournament again featured sixty-four teams, with teams placed into one of four sixteen-team regionals. The first four rounds were played on campus sites while the national and semifinal championship rounds were held at the Allen County War Memorial Coliseum in Fort Wayne, Indiana from March 14–16, 2024.

In their first–ever Division III tournament, Trine won the national championship, beating Hampden–Sydney 69–61.

Five teams made their first appearances in the NCAA Division III tournament: Geneva, Mary Baldwin, Roger Williams, SUNY New Paltz, and Trine.

== Tournament schedule and venues ==
2024 first and second round host sites

First and second rounds

First- and second-round games were played at campus sites on March 1 and March 2.

On the basis of team strength and geography, these locations were chosen to host first- and second-round games in the 2024 tournament:

- Kirby Field House, Hampden Sydney, Virginia (Host: Hampden–Sydney College)
- Franny Murray Court, Washington, D.C. (Host: Catholic University of America)
- Bell Center, San Antonio, Texas (Host: Trinity University)
- Gilbert Arena, Thousand Oaks, California (Host: California Lutheran University)
- Schwartz Center, Chester, Pennsylvania (Host: Widener University)
- Max Ziel Gymnasium, Oswego, New York (Host: State University of New York at Oswego)
- Ragan-Brown Field House, Greensboro, North Carolina (Host: Guilford College)
- Spaulding Gymnasium, Keene, New Hampshire (Host: Keene State College)
- Horsburgh Gymnasium, Cleveland, Ohio (Host: Case Western Reserve University)
- Williams Fieldhouse, Platteville, Wisconsin (Host: University of Wisconsin–Platteville)
- Washington University Field House, St. Louis, Missouri (Host: Washington University in St. Louis)
- MTI Center, Angola, Indiana (Host: Trine University)
- Crenshaw Gymnasium, Ashland, Virginia (Host: Randolph–Macon College)
- DeCarlo Varsity Center, University Heights, Ohio (Host: John Carroll University)
- John A. Paulson Center, New York, New York (Host: New York University)
- Ray Oosting Gymnasium, Hartford, Connecticut (Host: Trinity College)

Third and fourth rounds

2024 third and fourth round (blue) and Final Four (red) host sites

Third- and fourth-round games were played at campus sites on March 8 and March 9.

At the conclusion of the second round, the NCAA announced the following locations would host third- and fourth-round games.

- Kirby Field House, Hampden Sydney, Virginia (Host: Hampden–Sydney College)
- Ragan-Brown Field House, Greensboro, North Carolina (Host: Guilford College)
- MTI Center, Angola, Indiana (Host: Trine University)
- Ray Oosting Gymnasium, Hartford, Connecticut (Host: Trinity College)

National Semifinals and Championship

The National Semifinals and Championship were played on March 14 and March 16.

- Allen County War Memorial Coliseum, Fort Wayne, Indiana (Host: Manchester University)

Fort Wayne hosted the Final Four for the fourth time, having previously hosted in 2019, 2022, and 2023. Fort Wayne was also scheduled to host the Final Four in 2020 and 2021, before those editions of the tournament were canceled due to COVID-19 concerns.

== Qualifying teams ==
A total of sixty-four bids were available for the tournament: 42 automatic bids—awarded to the champions of the forty-two NCAA-recognized Division III conference tournaments—and 22 at-large bids.

There was a net decrease of two automatic bids this year, due to the automatic bids for the Colonial States Athletic Conference (whose members were folded into the United East Conference) and the New England Collegiate Conference (whose remaining full members all departed after the last season) having been eliminated. Starting next year, the Collegiate Conference of the South will get an automatic bid.

=== Automatic bids (42) ===
The following 42 teams are automatic qualifiers for the 2024 NCAA field by virtue of winning their conference's automatic bid (except for the UAA, whose regular-season champion received the automatic bid).

Automatic bids
Conference	Team	Record (Conf.)	Appearance	Last bid
AMCC	La Roche	17–10 (14–4)	5th	2023
American Rivers	Loras	23–5 (11–5)	4th	2019
American Southwest	Texas–Dallas	18–9 (12–4)	8th	2020
Atlantic East	Marymount	19–8 (10–2)	3rd	2023
Centennial	Swarthmore	20–8 (14–4)	7th	2023
CUNYAC	Baruch	19–8 (13–1)	8th	2023
Coast to Coast	Christopher Newport	21–6 (4–2)	27th	2023
CCIW	Elmhurst	22–5 (12–4)	8th	2022
Commonwealth Coast	Roger Williams	14–14 (8–8)	1st	Never
Empire 8	Utica	24–3 (15–1)	3rd	2023
Great Northeast	St. Joseph (CT)	24–4 (14–0)	4th	2023
HCAC	Anderson (IN)	23–4 (16–2)	3rd	2023
Landmark	Catholic	24–3 (16–2)	15th	2016
Liberty	Hobart	22–5 (13–5)	6th	2020
Little East	Keene State	24–3 (15–1)	9th	2023
MAC Commonwealth	Eastern	20–7 (10–4)	2nd	2022
MAC Freedom	Stevens	22–5 (11–3)	5th	2022
MASCAC	Worcester State	18–9 (10–2)	4th	2023
Michigan	Hope	22–6 (11–3)	30th	2023
Midwest	Illinois College	23–4 (13–3)	3rd	2023
Minnesota	Gustavus Adolphus	18–10 (14–6)	14th	2012
NESCAC	Trinity (CT)	26–1 (9–1)	10th	2016
NEWMAC	Babson	15–13 (8–8)	13th	2023
New Jersey	TCNJ	20–8 (11–7)	8th	2020
North Atlantic	Husson	23–5 (11–3)	9th	2022
North Coast	Wabash	20–8 (13–3)	8th	2023
NACC	Wisconsin Lutheran	24–4 (16–2)	2nd	2006
Northwest	Whitworth	19–8 (13–3)	17th	2023
Ohio	John Carroll	25–2 (17–1)	17th	2023
Old Dominion	Hampden–Sydney	26–2 (14–2)	16th	2023
Presidents'	Geneva	24–3 (18–2)	1st	Never
Skyline	Farmingdale State	26–2 (15–1)	8th	2023
SAA	Berry	19–9 (13–1)	3rd	2022
SCIAC	Claremont–Mudd–Scripps	21–6 (13–3)	15th	2018
SCAC	Centenary (LA)	17–11 (9–7)	2nd	2020
St. Louis	Fontbonne	20–7 (13–5)	6th	2023
SUNYAC	SUNY New Paltz	20–7 (12–6)	1st	Never
United East	Penn State Harrisburg	24–4 (11–1)	3rd	2022
UAA	Case Western Reserve	21–4 (10–4)	3rd	2023
Upper Midwest	Bethany Lutheran	24–3 (14–0)	4th	2023
USA South	Mary Baldwin	17–10 (11–3)	1st	Never
Wisconsin	UW–Platteville	23–4 (12–2)	15th	2022

=== At-large bids (22) ===
The following 22 teams were awarded qualification for the tournament field by the NCAA Division III Men's Basketball Committee. The committee evaluated teams on the basis of their win–loss percentage, strength of schedule, head-to-head results, results against common opponents, and results against teams included in the NCAA's final regional rankings.

At-large bids
Conference	Team	Record (Conf.)	Appearance	Last bid
SCIAC	Cal Lutheran	23–4 (15–1)	6th	2023
Michigan	Calvin	22–4 (12–2)	23rd	2022
UAA	Carnegie Mellon	16–9 (8–6)	4th	2009
American Rivers	Coe	21–5 (13–3)	4th	2023
MAC Freedom	DeSales	24–3 (14–0)	7th	2022
American Rivers	Dubuque	21–6 (11–5)	8th	2022
Old Dominion	Guilford	22–4 (13–3)	7th	2019
MAC Commonwealth	Hood	19–6 (11–3)	3rd	2022
American Rivers	Nebraska Wesleyan	23–4 (13–3)	18th	2020
UAA	NYU	20–5 (10–4)	12th	2023
SUNYAC	Oswego State	25–2 (18–0)	9th	2023
Old Dominion	Randolph–Macon	23–4 (15–1)	20th	2023
New Jersey	Rowan	19–7 (13–5)	16th	2023
SCAC	St. Thomas (TX)	20–6 (12–4)	2nd	2023
New Jersey	Stockton	17–10 (12–6)	19th	2023
Michigan	Trine	23–4 (12–2)	1st	Never
SCAC	Trinity (TX)	23–3 (14–2)	12th	2022
NESCAC	Tufts	19–7 (5–5)	8th	2023
Old Dominion	Virginia Wesleyan	19–8 (9–7)	16th	2015
UAA	Washington–St. Louis	18–7 (8–6)	25th	2023
MAC Commonwealth	Widener	23–4 (12–2)	18th	2023
NESCAC	Williams	21–6 (9–1)	20th	2023

== Tournament bracket ==
=== Top-left - Hampden Sydney, Virginia ===
First round March 1, 2024; Campus Sites
Hampden–Sydney	98
La Roche	61
Hampden Sydney, VA
Stevens	66
Farmingdale State	80
Catholic	75*
Worcester State	72
Washington, D.C.
Rowan	81
Carnegie Mellon	69
Trinity (TX)	63
Texas–Dallas	67
San Antonio, TX
Nebraska Wesleyan	58
Centenary (LA)	41
Cal Lutheran	73
Whitworth	78*
Thousand Oaks, CA
St. Thomas (TX)	71
Claremont–Mudd–Scripps	78

Second round March 2, 2024; Campus Sites
Hampden–Sydney	72
Farmingdale State	51
Catholic	85
Rowan	89
Texas–Dallas	63
Nebraska Wesleyan	77
Whitworth	67
Claremont–Mudd–Scripps	69

Sectional semifinals March 8, 2024; Hampden Sydney, VA
Hampden–Sydney	91
Rowan	76
Nebraska Wesleyan	74
Claremont–Mudd–Scripps	70

Sectional finals March 9, 2024; Hampden Sydney, VA
Hampden–Sydney	68
Nebraska Wesleyan	60

=== Bottom-left - Greensboro, North Carolina ===
First round March 1, 2024; Campus Sites
Widener	101
Roger Williams	70
Chester, PA
Christopher Newport	79
Hobart	59
Oswego State	74
Babson	63
Oswego, NY
DeSales	51
Williams	77
Guilford	87
Berry	70
Greensboro, NC
Hood	67
Penn State Harrisburg	72
Keene State	82
Marymount	76
Keene, NH
Eastern	80
TCNJ	79

Second round March 2, 2024; Campus Sites
Widener	65
Christopher Newport	70
Oswego State	77
Williams	79
Guilford	76
Penn State Harrisburg	59
Keene State	109
Eastern	85

Sectional semifinals March 8, 2024; Greensboro, NC
Christopher Newport	60
Williams	49
Guilford	82
Keene State	60

Sectional finals March 9, 2024; Greensboro, NC
Christopher Newport	48
Guilford	50

=== Top-right - Angola, Indiana ===
First round March 1, 2024; Campus Sites
Case Western Reserve	66
Mary Baldwin	51
Cleveland, OH
Hope	95
Anderson (IN)	79
UW–Platteville	89
Bethany Lutheran	52
Platteville, WI
Loras	89
Gustavus Adolphus	64
Washington–St. Louis	71*
Wisconsin Lutheran	68
St. Louis, MO
Dubuque	57
Illinois College	59
Trine	91
Fontbonne	81
Angola, IN
Coe	79*
Wabash	74

Second round March 2, 2024; Campus Sites
Case Western Reserve	97
Hope	79
UW–Platteville	81
Loras	67
Washington–St. Louis	68*
Illinois College	67
Trine	76
Coe	70

Sectional semifinals March 8, 2024; Angola, IN
Case Western Reserve	75
UW–Platteville	95
Washington–St. Louis	65
Trine	86

Sectional finals March 9, 2024; Angola, IN
UW–Platteville	86
Trine	88*

=== Bottom-right - Hartford, Connecticut ===
First round March 1, 2024; Campus Sites
Randolph–Macon	77
Baruch	45
Ashland, VA
St. Joseph (CT)	97
Geneva	83
John Carroll	85
SUNY New Paltz	81
University Heights, OH
Calvin	93
Elmhurst	78
NYU	82
Husson	61
New York, NY
Tufts	59
Stockton	55
Trinity (CT)	83
Utica	54
Hartford, CT
Virginia Wesleyan	59
Swarthmore	67

Second round March 2, 2024; Campus Sites
Randolph–Macon	75
St. Joseph (CT)	64
John Carroll	66
Calvin	71
NYU	62
Tufts	65
Trinity (CT)	83
Swarthmore	74

Sectional semifinals March 8, 2024; Hartford, CT
Randolph–Macon	59
Calvin	72
Tufts	53
Trinity (CT)	70

Sectional finals March 9, 2024; Hartford, CT
Calvin	62
Trinity (CT)	69

=== Final Four ===
National semifinals March 14; Fort Wayne, IN
Hampden–Sydney	62
Guilford	57
Trine	66
Trinity (CT)	54

National championship March 16; Fort Wayne, IN
Hampden–Sydney	61
Trine	69

== Record by conference ==
Conference	Record	Win %	R64	R32	S16	E8	F4	CG	NC
Michigan	10–2	.833	3	3	2	2	1	1	1
Old Dominion	11–4	.733	4	3	3	2	2	1	–
NESCAC	8–3	.727	3	3	3	1	1	–	–
Coast to Coast	3–1	.750	1	1	1	1	–	–	–
Wisconsin	3–1	.750	1	1	1	1	–	–	–
American Rivers	5–4	.556	4	3	1	1	–	–	–
UAA	5–4	.556	4	3	2	–	–	–	–
Little East	2–1	.667	1	1	1	–	–	–	–
SCIAC	2–2	.500	2	1	1	–	–	–	–
New Jersey	2–3	.400	3	1	1	–	–	–	–
MAC Commonwealth	2–3	.400	3	2	–	–	–	–	–
American Southwest	1–1	.500	1	1	–	–	–	–	–
Centennial	1–1	.500	1	1	–	–	–	–	–
Great Northeast	1–1	.500	1	1	–	–	–	–	–
Landmark	1–1	.500	1	1	–	–	–	–	–
Midwest	1–1	.500	1	1	–	–	–	–	–
Northwest	1–1	.500	1	1	–	–	–	–	–
Ohio	1–1	.500	1	1	–	–	–	–	–
Skyline	1–1	.500	1	1	–	–	–	–	–
United East	1–1	.500	1	1	–	–	–	–	–
SUNYAC	1–2	.333	2	1	–	–	–	–	–
SCAC	0–3	.000	3	–	–	–	–	–	–
MAC Freedom	0–2	.000	2	–	–	–	–	–	–

- The R64, R32, S16, E8, F4, CG, and NC columns indicate how many teams from each conference were in the round of 64 (first round), round of 32 (second round), Sweet 16, Elite Eight, Final Four, championship game, and national champion, respectively.
- The Allegheny Mountain, Atlantic East, CCIW, Commonwealth Coast, CUNYAC, Empire 8, Heartland, Liberty, MASCAC, Minnesota, NEWMAC, North Atlantic, North Coast, Northern Athletics, Presidents', SAA, SLIAC, Upper Midwest, and USA South each had one representative, eliminated in the Round of 64 with a record of 0–1.

== See also ==
- 2024 NCAA Division I men's basketball tournament
- 2024 NCAA Division II men's basketball tournament
- 2024 NAIA men's basketball tournament
- 2024 NCAA Division III women's basketball tournament
