= Bob Hamilton (basketball, born 1941) =

American college basketball coach

Biographical details
- Born: January 16, 1941 (age 85); Glenford, Ohio, U.S.

Playing career
- 1959–1963: Wittenberg

Coaching career (HC unless noted)
- 1968–1970: Wittenberg (assistant)
- 1970–1976: Wittenberg
- 1976–1980: Navy

Accomplishments and honors

Championships
- 4 OAC regular season (1972–1974, 1976); 3 OAC tournament (1972, 1974, 1975)

Awards
- NABC Division III Coach of the Year (1976)

Bob D. Hamilton (born January 16, 1941) is an American former college basketball coach. He served as head coach for Wittenberg University and the NCAA Division I United States Naval Academy.

Hamilton was born in Glenford, Ohio and played basketball at Wittenberg for coaches Ray Mears and Eldon Miller. He was a member of the Tigers' 1961 national championship team. In 1968, Hamilton joined Miller's Wittenberg staff as an assistant and, two years later, succeeded him as head coach.

Hamilton spent six seasons as Tigers head coach, compiling a 119–38 record and winning four Ohio Athletic Conference (OAC) regular season and three OAC tournament titles. In the 1975–76 season, he led the team to the NCAA Division III championship game, losing to champion Scranton in overtime. At the conclusion of the season he was named the NABC Division III Coach of the Year.

Following the season, Hamilton was hired as head coach at Division I Navy. He spent four seasons as the Midshipmen coach, posting a winning record in each season and gaining a reputation for fiery behavior. His career record at Navy was 54–47. He retired from coaching after Navy declined to renew his contract in 1980.
