= Trinity Bantams =

Intercollegiate sports teams of Trinity College

- University: Trinity College
- Conference: New England Small College Athletic Conference
- NCAA: Division III
- Athletic director: Andrew Galbraith
- Location: Hartford, Connecticut
- Varsity teams: 27 varsity
- Football stadium: Jessee/Miller Field
- Mascot: Bantam
- Nickname: Bants
- Colors: Royal Blue and Yellow
- Website: bantamsports.com
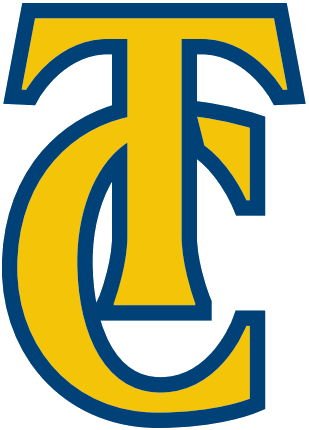

The Trinity Bantams are the varsity and club athletic teams of Trinity College, a selective liberal arts college located in Hartford, Connecticut. Trinity's varsity teams compete in the New England Small College Athletic Conference of the National Collegiate Athletic Association (NCAA) Division III. The College offers 27 varsity teams, plus club sports, intramural sports.

== Varsity teams ==
Men's sports	Women's sports
Baseball	Basketball
Basketball	Cross country
Cross country	Field hockey
Football	Ice hockey
Golf	Lacrosse
Ice hockey	Rowing
Lacrosse	Soccer
Rowing	Softball
Soccer	Squash
Squash	Swimming & diving
Swimming & diving	Tennis
Track & field^{†}	Track & field^{†}
Wrestling	Volleyball
† – Track and field includes both indoor and outdoor.

=== Baseball ===
The Trinity Baseball team won the NCAA Division III national title in 2008, after having started the season 44–0, shattering numerous records in the process. After having been handed their first loss of the year by Johns Hopkins (falling to 44–1), the Bantams clinched the national title by beating Johns Hopkins in the bottom of the ninth inning of the championship game. They finished the season with a 45–1 record.

=== Basketball ===
- Men's NCAA Division III Champions – 2025
- Men's NCAA Division III Final Four – 1995.
- Women's NCAA Tournament – 1995 & 1997.
- Women's ECAC Champions – 2000.
- Men's NESCAC Champions – 2008.

=== Crew ===
Both the men's and women's rowing teams are consistently ranked within the top five teams in NCAA Division III competition. In 2008, the women's Varsity 8+ won the NCAA Division III Rowing Championship title and placed second as a team, later going on to win the Jeffries Cup at Henley Women's Regatta.

The Bantams Women's Rowing Team won the NCAA Championship in 2014 at Eagle Lake in Indianapolis Indiana. The event, which occurred on May 30 and 31, 2014, resulted in both a team and First Varsity Eight win and ended Williams College's eight-year run as team champions in Women's NCAA Division III rowing.

=== Cross Country ===
Women's NCAA Division III National Runners Up – 2003. Men's NCAA Division III Championships –2000, 2006 – 2008.

=== Football ===
The Trinity Football team went undefeated in several seasons (2003–2005, 2008, 2012, 2016) and has won the NESCAC championship in eight of 15 recent seasons (2002–2005, 2008, 2012, 2016, and 2017). The Bantams had also won 59 straight games at home until October 25, 2014, losing to Middlebury College.

=== Field Hockey ===
NCAA Final Four – 1993, 1998 and 2021.

=== Golf ===
NESCAC Champions – 2010

=== Ice Hockey ===
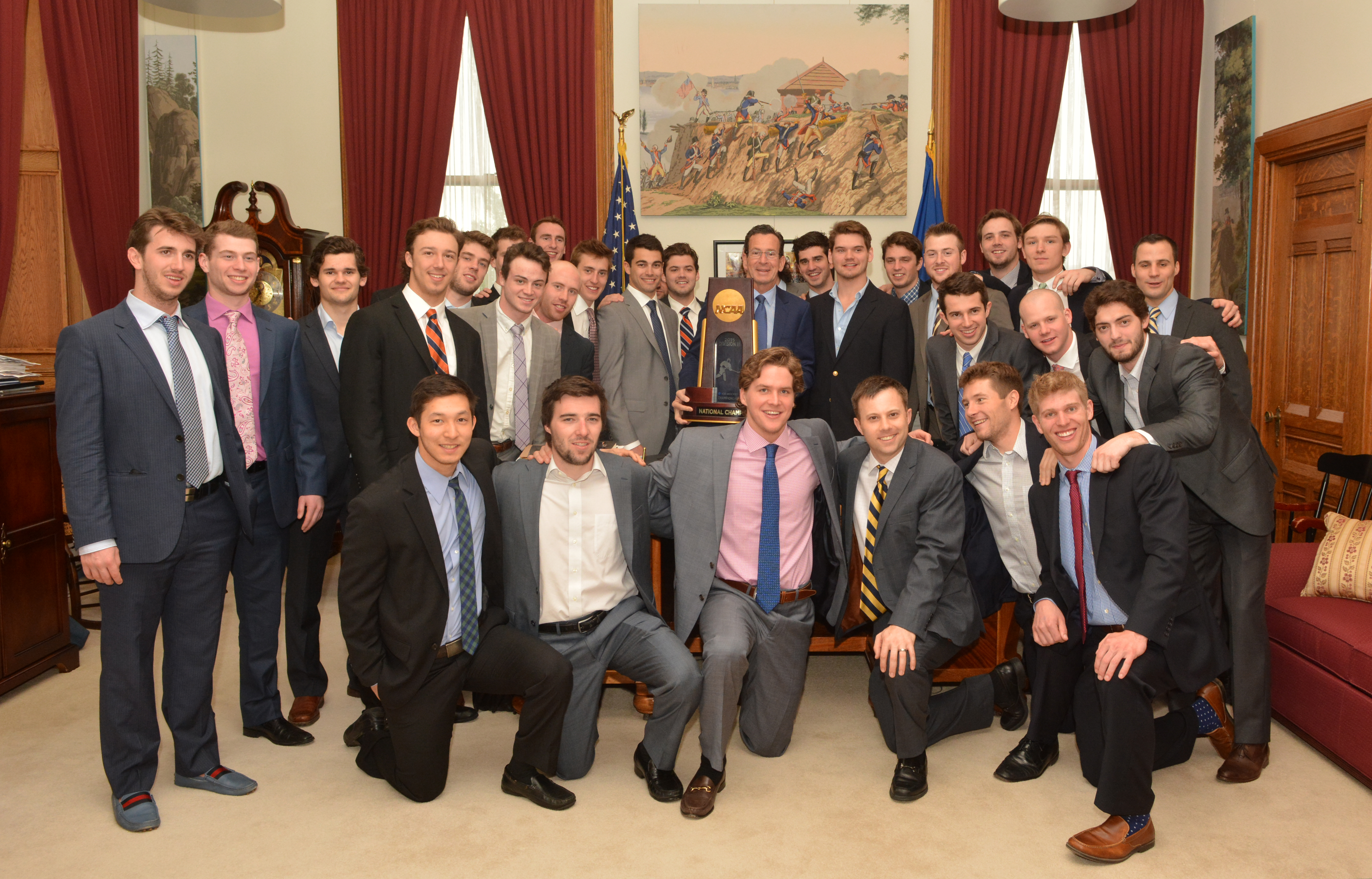
2015 National Champion Trinity team at the State Capitol in Hartford

NCAA Division III National Champions - 2015. By virtue of their 16–1–1 conference record, the Bantams received the top seed and home ice advantage throughout the 2015 NESCAC Men’s Ice Hockey Championship for a second consecutive season. Though eliminated in the NESCAC quarter finals by Tufts, the Bantams were awarded one of the four at large selections to the 2015 NCAA Division III tournament defeating Nichols, Plattsburgh State, and Adrian en route to their first national ice hockey championship by defeating Wisconsin-Stevens Point in the title game.

=== Lacrosse ===
- Women's NCAA National Champions – 2012
- women's NESCAC Champions – 2011
- women's NCAA Tournament – 1995, 1997, 1998, 2007, 2008, 2010, 2011

=== Squash ===
The Trinity Bantams men's squash team holds the record for the longest unbeaten streak in any intercollegiate sport in the nation's history. On January 18, 2012, Trinity's 252-game unbeaten streak ended in a 5–4 loss to the Yale Bulldogs. The Bantams have won 13 consecutive national titles since 1999, when they first took home the Potter Trophy. They have also garnered attention and praise from major media outlets such as ESPN, Sports Illustrated and USA Today, among others. They were recently ranked by ESPN as one of the top ten sports dynasties of all time.

=== Wrestling ===
New England Conference Champions – 2001

== National championships ==
=== Team ===
Sport	Association	Division	Year	Opponent/Runner-up	Score
Baseball (1)	NCAA	Division III	2008	Johns Hopkins	5–4
Men’s Basketball (1)	NCAA	Division III	2025	NYU	64–60
Men’s Ice Hockey (1)	NCAA	Division III	2015	Wisconsin–Stevens Point	5-2
