= WIAC men's basketball tournament =

Wisconsin Intercollegiate Athletic Conference men's basketball tournament
- Conference basketball championship
- Sport: Basketball
- Conference: Wisconsin Intercollegiate Athletic Conference
- Number of teams: 8
- Format: Single-elimination tournament
- Played: 1999–present
- Current champion: Wisconsin–La Crosse (1st)
- Most championships: Wisconsin–Stevens Point (9)
- Official website: WIAC men's basketball

Host stadiums
- Campus gyms (1999–present)

Host locations
- Campus sites (1999–present)

The Wisconsin Intercollegiate Athletic Conference men's basketball tournament is the annual conference basketball championship tournament for the NCAA Division III Wisconsin Intercollegiate Athletic Conference. The tournament has been held annually since 1999. It is a single-elimination tournament and seeding is based on regular season records.

The winner receives the WIAC's automatic bid to the NCAA Men's Division III Basketball Championship.

== Results ==
Year	Champions	Score	Runner-up	Venue
1999	UW–Platteville	90–88^{OT}	UW–Stout	Platteville, WI
2000	UW–Stevens Point	80–73	UW–Superior	Stevens Point, WI
2001	UW–Eau Claire	76–63	UW–Oshkosh	Eau Claire, WI
2002	UW–Oshkosh	70–69	UW–Whitewater	Oshkosh, WI
2003	UW–Oshkosh	68–63	UW–Whitewater	Whitewater, WI
2004	UW–Stevens Point	68–50	UW–Platteville	Stevens Point, WI
2005	UW–Stevens Point	87–77	UW–Whitewater	Stevens Point, WI
2006	UW–Whitewater	78–60	UW–Stout	Whitewater, WI
2007	UW–Stevens Point	83–68	UW–La Crosse	Stevens Point, WI
2008	UW–Whitewater	75–71	UW–Stevens Point	Whitewater, WI
2009	UW–Stevens Point	45–42	UW–Platteville	Stevens Point, WI
2010	UW–Stevens Point	63–57	UW–Whitewater	Whitewater, WI
2011	UW–Stevens Point	79–56	UW–River Falls	Stevens Point, WI
2012	UW–River Falls	64–58	UW–Whitewater	Whitewater, WI
2013	UW–Whitewater	66–55	UW–Platteville	Whitewater, WI
2014	UW–Stevens Point	74–57	UW–Whitewater	Stevens Point, WI
2015	UW–Whitewater	71–57	UW–Oshkosh	Whitewater, WI
2016	UW–Oshkosh	66–63	UW–River Falls	Oshkosh, WI
2017	UW–River Falls	60–59	UW–Oshkosh	River Falls, WI
2018	UW–Stevens Point	59–44	UW–River Falls	Stevens Point, WI
2019	UW–Platteville	70–57	UW–Stevens Point	Platteville, WI
2020	UW–Oshkosh	78–72	UW–Eau Claire	Oshkosh, WI
2021	UW–Platteville	74–47	UW–La Crosse	La Crosse, WI
2022	UW–Oshkosh	75–73	UW–Platteville	Oshkosh, WI
2023	UW–Whitewater	92–79	UW–Oshkosh	Oshkosh, WI
2024	UW–Platteville	97–74	UW–River Falls	Platteville, WI
2025	UW–Platteville	89–68	UW–La Crosse	Platteville, WI
2026	UW–La Crosse	81–78	UW–Whitewater	Whitewater, WI

== Championship records ==
School	Finals Record	Finals Appearances	Years
Wisconsin–Stevens Point	9–2	11	2000, 2004, 2005, 2007, 2009, 2010, 2011, 2014, 2018
Wisconsin–Whitewater	5–7	12	2006, 2008, 2013, 2015, 2023
Wisconsin–Platteville	5–4	9	1999, 2019, 2021, 2024, 2025
Wisconsin–Oshkosh	5–4	9	2002, 2003, 2016, 2020, 2022
Wisconsin–River Falls	2–4	6	2012, 2017
Wisconsin–La Crosse	1–3	4	2026
Wisconsin–Eau Claire	1–1	2	2001
Wisconsin–Stout	0–2	2	
Wisconsin–Superior	0–1	1	

- Schools highlighted in pink are former members of the WIAC
