= Conference of New England men's basketball tournament =

- Conference basketball championship
- Sport: Basketball
- Conference: Conference of New England
- Format: Single-elimination tournament
- Played: 1985–present
- Current champion: Endicott (8th)
- Most championships: Endicott (8)
- Official website: CNE men's basketball

Host stadiums
- Campus gyms (2004–present)

Host locations
- Campus sites (2004–present)

The Conference of New England men's basketball tournament is the annual conference basketball championship tournament for the NCAA Division III Conference of New England. The tournament has been held annually since 1985. It is a single-elimination tournament and seeding is based on regular season records.

As conference champion, the winner receives the CNE's automatic bid to the NCAA Men's Division III Basketball Championship.

== Results ==
=== Finals champion only ===
- Championship game results incomplete, 1985–2003

Year	Champions
1985	Coast Guard
1986	Curry
1987	Roger Williams
1988	Coast Guard
1989	Salve Regina
1990	Anna Maria
1991	Anna Maria
1992	Anna Maria
1993	Eastern Nazarene
1994	Anna Maria
1995	Salve Regina
1996	Anna Maria
1997	Wentworth
1998	Wentworth
1999	Roger Williams
2000	Endicott
2001	Colby-Sawyer
2002	Colby-Sawyer
2003	Colby-Sawyer

=== Full results ===
Year	Champions	Score	Runner-up	Venue
2004	Endicott	83–76	Colby-Sawyer	Beverly, MA
2005	Endicott	71–59	Roger Williams	Beverly, MA
2006	Endicott	65–56	Colby-Sawyer	Beverly, MA
2007	Wentworth	98–90	Curry	Milton, MA
2008	Curry	83–66	Roger Williams	Milton, MA
2009	New England	90–79	Colby-Sawyer	Biddeford, ME
2010	Gordon	56–54	Curry	Wenham, MA
2011	Salve Regina	68–58 (OT)	Wentworth	Boston, MA
2012	Endicott	90–66	Salve Regina	Newport, RI
2013	Curry	69–63	Gordon	Milton, MA
2014	Gordon	69–65	Nichols	Dudley, MA
2015	Endicott	90–60	Wentworth	Beverly, MA
2016	Endicott	75–62	Roger Williams	Beverly, MA
2017	Nichols	67–64	Endicott	Dudley, MA
2018	Nichols	98–89	Endicott	Dudley, MA
2019	Nichols	105–90	Gordon	Worcester, MA
2020	Nichols	76–75	Endicott	Beverly, MA
2021	Cancelled due to the COVID-19 pandemic			
2022	Nichols	60–55	Salve Regina	Dudley, MA
2023	Nichols	87–64	Western New England	Dudley, MA
2024	Roger Williams	79–76	Suffolk	Bristol, RI
2025	Western New England	75–74	Suffolk	Springfield, MA
2026	Endicott	87–66	Western New England	Beverly, MA

== Championship records ==
- Results incomplete for 1985–2003

School	Finals Record	Finals Appearances	Years
Endicott	8–3	11	2000, 2004, 2005, 2006, 2012, 2015, 2016, 2026
Nichols	6–1	7	2017, 2018, 2019, 2020, 2022, 2023
Anna Maria	5–0	5	1990, 1991, 1992, 1994, 1996
Roger Williams	3–3	6	1987, 1999, 2024
Colby-Sawyer	3–3	6	2001, 2002, 2003
Curry	3–2	5	1986, 2008, 2013
Wentworth	3–2	5	1997, 1998, 2007
Salve Regina	3–2	5	1989, 1995, 2011
Gordon	2–2	4	2010, 2014
Coast Guard	2–0	2	1985, 1988
Western New England	1–2	3	2025
New England	1–0	1	2009
Eastern Nazarene	1–0	1	1993
Suffolk	0–2	2	

- Hartford and Johnson & Wales have not yet qualified for the CNE tournament finals.
- Schools highlighted in pink are former members of CNE.
