= Great Northeast Athletic Conference men's basketball tournament =

- Conference basketball championship
- Sport: Basketball
- Conference: Great Northeast Athletic Conference
- Format: Single-elimination tournament
- Played: 1996–present
- Current champion: St. Joseph's (ME) (3rd)
- Most championships: Albertus Magnus (9)
- Official website: GNAC men's basketball

The Great Northeast Athletic Conference men's basketball tournament is the annual conference basketball championship tournament for the NCAA Division III Great Northeast Athletic Conference. The tournament has been held annually since 1996. It is a single-elimination tournament and seeding is based on regular conference season records.

The winner receives the GNAC's automatic bid to the NCAA Men's Division III Basketball Championship.

== Results ==
Year	Champions	Score	Runner-up
1996	Albertus Magnus	103–81	Emerson
1997	Emerson	68–66	Albertus Magnus
1998	Emerson	79–59	Rivier
1999	Endicott	83–70	Emerson
2000	Western New England	84–74	Emerson
2001	Western New England	95–89	Emerson
2002	Suffolk	76–71	Johnson & Wales
2003	Southern Vermont	89–73	Albertus Magnus
2004	Johnson & Wales	68–58	Southern Vermont
2005	Norwich	69–60	Emerson
2006	Norwich	85–76	Emerson
2007	Rivier	59–57	Emmanuel
2008	Lasell	86–72	Emerson
2009	St. Joseph's (ME)	74–72	Emmanuel
2010	Albertus Magnus	85–69	Emerson
2011	Johnson & Wales	76–66	St. Joseph's (ME)
2012	Albertus Magnus	88–54	Anna Maria
2013	Albertus Magnus	87–80	Anna Maria
2014	Albertus Magnus	84–49	St. Joseph's (ME)
2015	Albertus Magnus	98–85	Johnson & Wales
2016	Johnson & Wales	86–75	Albertus Magnus
2017	Albertus Magnus	101–83	Lasell
2018	Johnson & Wales	84–80	Albertus Magnus
2019	Albertus Magnus	81–77	Saint Joseph (CT)
2020	Saint Joseph (CT)	88–84	Albertus Magnus
2021	Cancelled due to COVID-19 pandemic		
2022	Saint Joseph (CT)	94–67	Albertus Magnus
2023	Albertus Magnus	83–79	Saint Joseph (CT)
2024	Saint Joseph (CT)	78–59	Saint Joseph's (ME)
2025	Saint Joseph's (ME)	79–72	Lasell
2026	Saint Joseph's (ME)	92–58	Saint Joseph (CT)

== Championship records ==
School	Finals Record	Finals Appearances	Years
Albertus Magnus	9–6	15	1996, 2010, 2012, 2013, 2014, 2015, 2017, 2019, 2023
Johnson & Wales	4–2	6	2004, 2011, 2016, 2018
St. Joseph's (ME)	3–3	6	2009, 2025, 2026
Saint Joseph (CT)	3–3	6	2020, 2022, 2024
Emerson	2–8	10	1997, 1998
Western New England	2–0	2	2000, 2001
Norwich	2–0	2	2005, 2006
Lasell	1–2	3	2008
Rivier	1–1	2	2007
Southern Vermont	1–1	2	2003
Suffolk	1–0	1	2002
Endicott	1–0	1	1999
Anna Maria	0–2	2	
Emmanuel	0–2	2	

- Colby–Sawyer, Dean, Elms, Mitchell, New England, and Regis have not yet qualified for the GNAC tournament finals
- Daniel Webster and Mount Ida never qualified for the tournament finals while members of the GNAC
- Schools highlighted in pink are former members of the GNAC

== See also ==
- NCAA Men's Division III Basketball Championship
