= 2009 NCAA Division III men's basketball tournament =

American collegiate men's basketball tournament (2009)

- Finals site: , Salem, Virginia
- Champions: Washington–St. Louis (2nd title)
- Runner-up: Richard Stockton (1st title game)
- Semifinalists: Guilford (1st Final Four); Franklin & Marshall (5th Final Four)
- Winning coach: Mark Edwards (WUSL)
- MOP: Sean Wallis (WUSL)
- Attendance: 48,795

The 2009 NCAA Division III men's basketball tournament was a single-elimination tournament to determine the men's collegiate basketball national champion of National Collegiate Athletic Association (NCAA) Division III.

The tournament began on March 5, 2009 and concluded with the national championship game on March 21, 2009 at the Salem Civic Center in Salem, Virginia. The tournament was won by the Washington University in St. Louis, which defeated Stockton University (then Richard Stockton College of New Jersey), 61-52, in the title game.

The championship was the second in the Bears' history and second consecutive title.

== Qualifying teams ==
School	Conference	Record
Capital	OAC	26–4
Thomas More	Presidents' Athletic Conference	19–8
Wooster	NCAC	22–6
Gettysburg	Centennial Conference	18–8
Trinity	SCAC	23–4
Maryville	GSAC	20–6
Texas-Dallas	American Southwest Conference	24–4
John Carroll	OAC	23–5
Medaille	AMCC	21–6
Carnegie Mellon	UAA	19–6
Brockport St.	SUNYAC	14–14
Averett	USA South	20–8
Centre	SCAC	23–3
Guilford	ODAC	21–5
Transylvania	HCAC	21–5
Wheaton (IL)	CCIW	24–3
Fontbonne	SLIAC	18–8
Wis.-Platteville	WIAC	22–5
Hope	Michigan Intercollegiate Athletic Association	21–7
Washington-St. Louis	University Athletic Association	23–2
Lawrencer	MWC	19–6
Wis.-Whitewater	WIAC	22–5
Elmhurst	CCIW	20–8
Aurora	NAC	16–12
St. Thomas (Minnesota)	MIAC	27–0
Wis.-Stevens Point	WIAC	23–4
Cornell	IIAC	21–6
Claremont-Mudd-Scripps	SCIAC	21–6
Whitworth	Northwest Conference	22–5
Puget Sound	Northwest Conference	24–3
Bridgewater St.	MASCAC	20–6
St. Joseph's (Maine)	GNAC	21–7
Middlebury	New England Small College Athletic Conference	24–3
MIT	NEWMAC	20–8
Rhode Island	LEC	23–5
Farmingdale St	Skyline Conference	24–3
U. of New England	CCC	24–4
St. Lawrence	Liberty	20–6
Brooklyn	CUNYAC	23–5
SUNYIT	NEAC	22–6
ELms	NECC	26–1
Richard Stockton	NJAC	25–2
RPI	Liberty League	15–12
Gwynedd-Mercy	CSAC	
Amherst	NESCAC	21–6
Widener	MACC	22–5
Virginia Wesleyan	ODAC	17–12
Salem St.	MASCAC	21–6
RIT	Empire 8	19–8
Franklin & Marshall	Centennial Conference	22–5
Wesley	CAC	18–9
Brandeis	University Athletic Association	17–8
Scranton	Landmark Conference	21–6
WPI	NEWMAC	20–5
Husson	NAC	16–11
Mass. Dartmouth	LEC	15–11
Baruch	CUNYAC	23–5
DeSales	ECAC	22–5
St. Joseph's (L.I.)	Skyline Conference	22–5
Ithaca	Empire 8	24–2

== Bracket ==
Results to date

* – Denotes overtime period

=== John Carroll sectional ===
First round
Trinity (TX)	68
Maryville (TN)	64
Capital	80*
Thomas More	77
Wooster	79
Gettysburg	66
John Carroll	90
Medaille	79
Carnegie Mellon	75**
Brockport State	70
Centre	71
Averett	76
Guilford	71*
Transylvania	67

Second round
Texas–Dallas	70
Trinity (TX)	54
Capital	72
Wooster	70
John Carroll	76
Carnegie Mellon	74
Averett	81
Guilford	91

Sectional semifinals
Texas–Dallas	71
Capital	63
John Carroll	73
Guilford	78

Sectional finals
Texas–Dallas	59
Guilford	64*

=== Wheaton (IL) sectional ===
First round
Wheaton (IL)	85
Fontbonne	58
UW–Platteville	83
Hope	59
Elmhurst	79
UW–Whitewater	81*
Washington–St. Louis	67
Lawrence	65
St. Thomas (MN)	96
Aurora	73
UW–Stevens Point	61
Cornell College	53
Whitworth	81
Claremont–Mudd–Scripps	63

Second round
Wheaton (IL)	74*
UW–Platteville	69
UW–Whitewater	70
Washington–St. Louis	73
St. Thomas (MN)	53
UW–Stevens Point	50
Whitworth	72
Puget Sound	84

Sectional semifinals
Wheaton (IL)	52
Washington–St. Louis	55
St. Thomas (MN)	86
Puget Sound	69

Sectional finals
Washington–St. Louis	79
St. Thomas (MN)	64

=== Richard Stockton sectional ===
First round
Bridgewater State	95
St. Joseph's (ME)	79
Rhode Island College	68
MIT	73*
Farmingdale State	90
New England	73
St. Lawrence	81
Brooklyn	69
Elms	77
SUNYIT	85
Richard Stockton	79
RPI	65
Gwynedd–Mercy	68
Amherst	62

Second round
Middlebury	76
Bridgewater State	78
MIT	61
Farmingdale State	67
St. Lawrence	90
SUNYIT	80
Richard Stockton	95
Gwynedd–Mercy	88

Sectional semifinals
Bridgewater State	64
Farmingdale State	84
St. Lawrence	68
Richard Stockton	71

Sectional finals
Farmingdale State	60
Richard Stockton	103

=== Franklin & Marshall sectional ===
First round
Widener	74
Virginia Wesleyan	66
Salem State	83
RIT	71
Franklin & Marshall	93
Wesley	69
Scranton	60
Brandeis	74
WPI	86
Husson	57
UMass Dartmouth	82
Baruch	72
DeSales	86
St. Joseph's (LI)	78

Second round
Widener	67
Salem State	69
Franklin & Marshall	65
Brandeis	63
WPI	68
UMass Dartmouth	81
DeSales	77
Ithaca	71

Sectional semifinals
Salem State	61
Franklin & Marshall	67
UMass Dartmouth	59
DeSales	67

Sectional finals
Franklin & Marshall	70
DeSales	60

== Final Four ==
- Site: Salem Civic Center, Salem, Virginia

National Semifinals
Guilford	58
Washington–St. Louis	77
Richard Stockton	62
Franklin & Marshall	58

National Championship
Washington–St. Louis	61
Richard Stockton	52
National Third-place
Guilford	79
Franklin & Marshall	67
