= Centennial Conference men's basketball tournament =

- Conference basketball championship
- Sport: Basketball
- Conference: Centennial Conference
- Format: Single-elimination tournament
- Played: 1994–present
- Current champion: Gettysburg (4th)
- Most championships: Franklin & Marshall (9)
- Official website: Centennial men's basketball

The Centennial Conference men's basketball tournament is the annual conference basketball championship tournament for the NCAA Division III Centennial Conference. The tournament has been held annually since 1994. It is a single-elimination tournament and seeding is based on regular season records.

The tournament champion receives the Centennial's automatic bid to the NCAA Men's Division III Basketball Championship.

== Format ==
Ten teams compete in this competition and each team face the other team twice each season, so there are 18 within-conference matches each season. After the regular season, the fifth ranked team visit the fourth ranked team for the first round match. Then the final four tournament is hosted by the first ranked team.

In 2004, the play-in match was played because Gettysburg and Haverford were tied for the fourth place, but the first round match has been always held between the fourth and the fifth ranked teams thereafter. Until 2003, ten teams were divided two east and west divisions and top two teams from each division advanced to the tournament while play-in match was played if two teams were tied for the second place in the division.

== Results ==
Year	Champions	Score	Runners-up	Refs
1994	Franklin & Marshall	63–61	Johns Hopkins	
1995	Muhlenberg	88–86 (OT)	Franklin & Marshall	
1996	Franklin & Marshall	79–67	Gettysburg	
1997	Dickinson	90–59	Swarthmore	
1998	Muhlenberg	55–53	Johns Hopkins	
1999	Johns Hopkins	78–52	Washington (MD)	
2000	Franklin & Marshall	75–67 (OT)	Johns Hopkins	
2001	Gettysburg	68–59	Muhlenberg	
2002	Gettysburg	50–47	Franklin & Marshall	
2003	Ursinus	96–88 (OT)	Franklin & Marshall	
2004	Franklin & Marshall	69–58	Johns Hopkins	
2005	Ursinus	72–70	Franklin & Marshall	
2006	Ursinus	100–82	Johns Hopkins	
2007	Johns Hopkins	68–61	Haverford	
2008	Ursinus	85–78	Gettysburg	
2009	Gettysburg	73–65	Franklin & Marshall	
2010	Franklin & Marshall	66–62	Gettysburg	
2011	Franklin & Marshall	65–55	Dickinson	
2012	Franklin & Marshall	71–55	Muhlenberg	
2013	Dickinson	64–40	Franklin & Marshall	
2014	Johns Hopkins	60–55	Dickinson	
2015	Dickinson	65–62	Johns Hopkins	
2016	Franklin & Marshall	75–64	Swarthmore	
2017	Swarthmore	68–64	Dickinson	
2018	Johns Hopkins	61–57	Swarthmore	
2019	Swarthmore	79–61	Johns Hopkins	
2020	Johns Hopkins	73–71	Swarthmore	
2021	Cancelled due to the COVID-19 pandemic			
2022	Johns Hopkins	80–66	Swarthmore	
2023	Swarthmore	76–73	Johns Hopkins	
2024	Swarthmore	67–62	Johns Hopkins	
2025	Franklin & Marshall	60–47	Johns Hopkins	
2026	Gettysburg	51–47	Johns Hopkins	

== Championship records ==
=== Performance by school ===
School	Finals Record	Finals Appearances	Years won
Franklin & Marshall	9–6	15	1994, 1996, 2000, 2004, 2010, 2011, 2012, 2016, 2025
Johns Hopkins	6–11	17	1999, 2007, 2014, 2018, 2020, 2022
Swarthmore	4–5	9	2017, 2019, 2023, 2024
Gettysburg	4–3	7	2001, 2002, 2009, 2026
Ursinus	4–0	4	2003, 2005, 2006, 2008
Dickinson	3–3	6	1997, 2013, 2015
Muhlenberg	2–2	4	1995, 1998
Haverford	0–1	1	
Washington (MD)	0–1	1	

- McDaniel (formerly Western Maryland) has not yet qualified for the Centennial tournament finals

=== Performance by year ===
Teams (# of titles)		1994	1995	1996	1997	1998	1999	2000	2001	2002	2003	2004	2005	2006	2007	2008	2009	2010	2011	2012	2013	2014	2015	2016	2017	2018	2019	2020	2022	2023	2024	2025
Centennial (31)		(10)	(10)	(10)	(10)	(10)	(10)	(10)	(10)	(10)	(10)	(10)	(10)	(10)	(10)	(10)	(10)	(10)	(10)	(10)	(10)	(10)	(10)	(10)	(10)	(10)	(10)	(10)	(10)	(10)	(10)	(10)
1	Franklin & Marshall (9)	C	F	C		SF	SF	C	SF	F	F	C	F				F	C	C	C	F	SF	SF	C	SF	SF	1R			1R	SF	C
2	Johns Hopkins (6)	F			SF	F	C	F			SF	F	1R	F	C	SF				1R	SF	C	F		1R	C	F	C	C	F	F	F
3	Ursinus (4)						PI	PI	SF	SF	C	SF	C	C	SF	C		1R							SF	SF	SF		SF		1R	SF
3	Swarthmore (4)		SF		F																			F	C	F	C	F	F	C	C	1R
5	Dickinson (3)				C											SF			F	SF	C	F	C	SF	F	1R			1R		1R	1R
5	Gettysburg (3)			F					C	C		SF	SF	SF	SF	F	C	F	SF		1R		SF	SF					SF	SF	SF	SF
7	Muhlenberg (2)	SF	C	SF	PI	C	SF	SF	F	SF				1R	1R		SF	SF		F	SF	1R						SF		SF		
8	Haverford			SF								PI	SF		F				SF									SF				
8	Washington (MD)	SF			SF	SF	F	SF			SF			SF			1R	SF		SF							SF	1R				
10	McDaniel		SF													1R	SF		1R			SF	1R	1R								

Key

C	Champion
F	Runner-up
SF	Semifinals
1R	1st round
PI	Play-in
•	Did not participate
