= American Rivers Conference men's basketball tournament =

- Conference basketball championship
- Sport: Basketball
- Conference: American Rivers Conference
- Number of teams: 6
- Format: Single-elimination tournament
- Current champion: Loras (4th)
- Most championships: Buena Vista (7)
- Official website: ARC men's basketball

Host stadiums
- Campus arenas (1999–present)

Host locations
- Campus sites (1999–present)

The American Rivers Conference men's basketball tournament is the annual conference basketball championship tournament for the NCAA Division III American Rivers Conference. It is a single-elimination tournament and seeding is based on regular season records.

The tournament was previously known as the Iowa Intercollegiate Athletic Conference men's basketball tournament, changing its name with the league in 2018–19.

As conference champion, the winner receives the A-R-C's automatic bid to the NCAA Men's Division III Basketball Championship.

Buena Vista are the most successful team, with 7 titles.

== Results ==
- Record incomplete prior to 1999

Year	Champions	Score	Runner-up
1999	Upper Iowa	81–79	Simpson
2000	Buena Vista	85–74	Coe
2001	Wartburg	89–79	Buena Vista
2002	Buena Vista	85–73	Wartburg
2003	Buena Vista	72–70	Wartburg
2004	Buena Vista	70–48	Wartburg
2005	Buena Vista	79–68	Wartburg
2006	Buena Vista	69–66	Coe
2007	Loras	77–62	Buena Vista
2008	Loras	77–69	Buena Vista
2009	Cornell	58–56	Wartburg
2010	Central	99–79	Buena Vista
2011	Luther	57–48	Dubuque
2012	Buena Vista	54–52	Coe
2013	Dubuque	73–60	Wartburg
2014	Central	74–70	Luther
2015	Dubuque	81–73	Wartburg
2016	Central	92–80	Wartburg
2017	Wartburg	89–85	Central
2018	Nebraska Wesleyan	82–78	Central
2019	Nebraska Wesleyan	97–79	Loras
2020	Nebraska Wesleyan	76–50	Coe
2021	Dubuque	78–64	Buena Vista
2022	Dubuque	71–52	Buena Vista
2023	Coe	93–86	Loras
2024	Loras	85–76	Nebraska Wesleyan
2025	Central	68–57	Nebraska Wesleyan
2026	Loras	83–62	Dubuque

== Championship records ==
- Results incomplete before 1999

School	Finals Record	Finals Appearances	Years
Buena Vista	7–6	13	2000, 2002, 2003, 2004, 2005, 2006, 2012
Loras	4–2	6	2007, 2008, 2024, 2026
Central	4–2	6	2010, 2014, 2016, 2025
Dubuque	4–2	6	2013, 2015, 2021, 2022
Nebraska Wesleyan	3–2	5	2018, 2019, 2020
Wartburg	2–8	10	2001, 2017
Coe	1–4	5	2023
Luther	1–1	2	2011
Cornell	1–0	1	2009
Upper Iowa	1–0	1	1999
Simpson	0–1	1	

- Schools highlighted in pink are former members of the A-R-C/IIAC
