= Empire 8 men's basketball tournament =

- Conference basketball championship
- Sport: Basketball
- Conference: Empire 8
- Format: Single-elimination tournament
- Played: 2004–present
- Current champion: Keuka (1st)
- Most championships: St. John Fisher (8)
- Official website: Empire 8 men's basketball

The Empire 8 men's basketball tournament is the annual conference basketball championship tournament for the NCAA Division III Empire 8 conference. The tournament has been held annually since 2004. It is a single-elimination tournament and seeding is based on regular season records.

The winner, declared Empire 8 champion, receives the league's automatic bid to the NCAA Men's Division III Basketball Championship.

Prior to 2004, the league championship was awarded to the team with the best regular-season record. Since the tournament's establishment, St. John Fisher was the most successful program, with 6 titles.

== Results ==
Year	Champions	Score	Runner-up
2004	St. John Fisher	62–59	Utica
2005	St. John Fisher	92–51	RIT
2006	St. John Fisher	74–61	Utica
2007	St. John Fisher	78–73 (OT)	Utica
2008	Nazareth	64–63	St. John Fisher
2009	RIT	76–71 (OT)	Nazareth
2010	Nazareth	65–64	St. John Fisher
2011	Hartwick	69–58	St. John Fisher
2012	Ithaca	71–55	Nazareth
2013	Ithaca	70–55	Stevens Tech
2014	Hartwick	67–62	Nazareth
2015	St. John Fisher	77–62	Alfred
2016	Hartwick	93–91	St. John Fisher
2017	St. John Fisher	80–69	Stevens Tech
2018	Nazareth	66–64	Utica
2019	Alfred	90–78	St. John Fisher
2020	St. John Fisher	72–64	Nazareth
2021	Utica	89–65	St. John Fisher
2022	Nazareth	54–53	Utica
2023	St. John Fisher	78–62	Nazareth
2024	Utica	97–90	Nazareth
2025	Utica	89–76	SUNY Poly
2026	Keuka	83–80	Brockport

== Championship records ==
School	Finals record	Finals appearances	Years
St. John Fisher	8–6	14	2004, 2005, 2006, 2007, 2015, 2017, 2020, 2023
Nazareth	4–6	10	2008, 2010, 2018, 2022
Hartwick	3–0	3	2011, 2014, 2016
Utica	2–5	7	2021, 2024
Ithaca	2–0	2	2012, 2013
Alfred	1–1	2	2019
RIT	1–1	2	2009
Keuka	1–0	1	2026
Stevens Tech	0–2	2	
SUNY Poly	0–1	1	
Brockport	0–1	1	

- Schools highlighted in pink are former members of the Empire 8
- Elmira, Geneseo, Houghton, and Sage have not yet qualified for the Empire 8 tournament finals
- Medaille never qualified for the tournament finals as Empire 8 members.
