= CUNYAC men's basketball tournament =

- Conference basketball championship
- Sport: Basketball
- Conference: City University of New York Athletic Conference
- Format: Single-elimination tournament
- Played: 1966–present
- Current champion: Lehman (6th)
- Most championships: Staten Island (15)
- Official website: CUNYAC men's basketball

Host locations
- '

The CUNYAC men's basketball tournament is the annual conference basketball championship tournament for the NCAA Division III City University of New York Athletic Conference. The tournament has been held annually since 1966. It is a single-elimination tournament and seeding is based on regular season records.

The winner receives the CUNYAC's automatic bid to the NCAA Men's Division III Basketball Championship.

Staten Island, with 15 titles, are the most successful program in tournament history.

== Results ==
Year	Champions	Score	Runner-up
1966	CCNY	63–54	Queens
1967	CCNY	85–62	Hunter
1968	CCNY	80–67	Queens
1969	Queens	70–69	CCNY
1970	Hunter	70–54	Queens
1971	CCNY	81–73	Queens
1972	CCNY	69–61	Hunter
1973	Brooklyn	69–64	CCNY
1974	Lehman	60–58	Medgar Evers
1975	Lehman	54–51	CCNY
1976	CCNY	61–57	York
1977	CCNY	69–66	Hunter
1978	CCNY	64–58	Brooklyn
1979	Staten Island	92–78	Queens
1980	CCNY	73–59	Queens
1981	Staten Island	83–72	Queens
1982	Staten Island	83–77	Baruch
1983	Staten Island	74–56	John Jay
1984	Lehman	70–61	Staten Island
1985	Staten Island	60–55	Lehman
1986	Staten Island	78–75	CCNY
1987	Lehman	89–70	Staten Island
1988	Staten Island	72–69	Hunter
1989	Staten Island	55–48	Lehman
1990	Hunter	103–80	Medgar Evers
1991	Medgar Evers	101–92	Hunter
1992	Hunter	80–70	CCNY
1993	Hunter	104–73	Medgar Evers
1994	Hunter	96–68	Baruch
1995	Hunter	75–67	York
1996	Staten Island	66–62	York
1997	York	76–69	Lehman
1998	Hunter	76–55	York
1999	Staten Island	61–53	York
2000	Baruch	52–50	York
2001	CCNY	77–69	Staten Island
2002	Staten Island	59–57	Medgar Evers
2003	CCNY	84–79	Baruch
2004	Lehman	75–69	City Tech
2005	City Tech	76–66	Staten Island
2006	York	72–62	Baruch
2007	York	56–54	Staten Island
2008	John Jay	68–54	York
2009	Brooklyn	89–69	Baruch
2010	Brooklyn	79–68	York
2011	Medgar Evers	62–56	Staten Island
2012	Staten Island	82–81	Medgar Evers
2013	Staten Island	80–74	John Jay
2014	York	87–84	Staten Island
2015	Baruch	90–83 (2OT)	Brooklyn
2016	Brooklyn	76–67	Baruch
2017	Staten Island	77–66	CCNY
2018	Staten Island	77–75	Lehman
2019	Baruch	76–74	Staten Island
2020	Brooklyn	62–55	Baruch
2021	Cancelled due to COVID-19 pandemic		
2022	Baruch	75–69 (OT)	Lehman
2023	Baruch	83–82 (OT)	Lehman
2024	Baruch	73–71	Lehman
2025	John Jay	80–70	Baruch
2026	Lehman	101–56	CCNY

== Championship records ==
School	Finals record	Finals appearances	Years
Staten Island	15–8	23	1979, 1981, 1982, 1983, 1985, 1986, 1988, 1989, 1996, 1999, 2002, 2012, 2013, 2017, 2018
CCNY	11–7	18	1966, 1967, 1968, 1971, 1972, 1976, 1977, 1978, 1980, 2001, 2003
Hunter	7–5	12	1970, 1990, 1992, 1993, 1994, 1995, 1998
Baruch	6–7	13	2000, 2015, 2019, 2022, 2023, 2024
Lehman	6–6	12	1974, 1975, 1984, 1987, 2004, 2026
Brooklyn	5–2	7	1973, 2009, 2010, 2016, 2020
York	4–8	12	1997, 2006, 2007, 2014
Medgar Evers	2–5	7	1991, 2011
John Jay	2–2	3	2008, 2025
Queens	1–7	8	1969
City Tech	1–1	2	2005

- Schools highlighted in pink are former members of the CUNYAC

== See also ==
- NCAA Men's Division III Basketball Championship
