= SLIAC men's basketball tournament =

- Conference basketball championship
- Sport: Basketball
- Conference: St. Louis Intercollegiate Athletic Conference
- Number of teams: 6
- Format: Single-elimination tournament
- Played: 1991–1999, 2005–present
- Current champion: MUW (1st)
- Most championships: Fontbonne (7)
- Official website: SLIAC men's basketball

Host stadiums
- Campus gyms (1991–1999, 2005–present)

Host locations
- Campus sites (1991–1999, 2005–present)

The SLIAC men's basketball tournament is the annual conference basketball championship tournament for the NCAA Division III St. Louis Intercollegiate Athletic Conference. The tournament has been held annually since the SLIAC started play in 1991, with a five-year hiatus between 2000 and 2004. It is a single-elimination tournament and seeding is based on regular season records.

The winner receives the SLIAC's automatic bid to the NCAA Men's Division III Basketball Championship.

== Results ==
Year	Champions	Score	Runner-up
1991	Blackburn	68–48	Westminster
1992	Blackburn	73–62	MacMurray
1993	MacMurray	81–76	Westminster
1994	Fontbonne	94–80	Blackburn
1995	Westminster	82–72	MacMurray
1996	Fontbonne	72–67	MacMurray
1997	Maryville	79–75 (OT)	Blackburn
1998	Greenville	80–79	Fontbonne
1999	MacMurray	71–69	Maryville
2000– 2004	Not held		
2005	Blackburn	65–52	Webster
2006	Maryville	90–65	Westminster
2007	Fontbonne	88–79 (OT)	Eureka
2008	Fontbonne	73–72	Maryville
2009	Fontbonne	87–82	Westminster
2010	Westminster	74–67	Eureka
2011	Webster	64–47	Westminster
2012	Westminster	58–56	MacMurray
2013	Spalding	64–62 (OT)	Eureka
2014	Webster	55–41	Spalding
2015	Spalding	58–51	Fontbonne
2016	Westminster	61–59	Spalding
2017	Westminster	128–121	Greenville
2018	Greenville	126–119	Blackburn
2019	Eureka	70–69	Webster
2020	Webster	121–112	Greenville
2021	Blackburn	77–69	Fontbonne
2022	Blackburn	76–56	Webster
2023	Fontbonne	55–49	Webster
2024	Fontbonne	80–48	Spalding
2025	Greenville	115–104	Webster
2026	MUW	77–76	Webster

== Championship records ==
School	Finals record	Finals appearances	Years
Fontbonne	7–3	10	1994, 1996, 2007, 2008, 2009, 2023, 2024
Westminster	5–5	10	1995, 2010, 2012, 2016, 2017
Blackburn	5–3	8	1991, 1992, 2005, 2021, 2022
Webster	3–6	9	2011, 2014, 2020
Greenville	3–2	5	1998, 2018, 2025
MacMurray	2–4	6	1993, 1999
Spalding	2–3	5	2013, 2015
Maryville	2–2	4	1997, 2006
MUW	1–0	1	2026
Eureka	1–3	4	2019

- Schools highlighted in pink are former members of the SLIAC
- Lyon and Principia have not yet qualified for the tournament finals
- Iowa Wesleyan, Parks, and Lincoln Christian never qualified for the tournament finals as conference members
