= Minnesota Intercollegiate Athletic Conference men's basketball tournament =

MIAC men's basketball tournament
- Conference basketball championship
- Sport: Basketball
- Conference: Minnesota Intercollegiate Athletic Conference
- Number of teams: 6
- Format: Single-elimination tournament
- Current champion: Gustavus Adolphus (11th)
- Most championships: St. Thomas (13)
- Official website: MIAC men's basketball

Host stadiums
- Campus arenas (2001–present)

Host locations
- Campus sites (2001–present)

The MIAC men's basketball tournament is the annual conference basketball championship tournament for the NCAA Division III Minnesota Intercollegiate Athletic Conference. It is a single-elimination tournament and seeding is based on regular season records.

The winner receives the MIAC's automatic bid to the NCAA Men's Division III Basketball Championship.

== Results ==
Year	Champions	Score	Runner-up	Venue
1985	Saint John's	54–47	Hamline	
1986	Saint John's	68–62	Bethel	
1987	Gustavus Adolphus	50–44	Saint John's	
1988	Saint John's	61–49	Gustavus Adolphus	
1989	Gustavus Adolphus	53–52	St. Thomas	
1990	St. Thomas	60–50	Saint John's	
1991	Bethel	73–70	Gustavus Adolphus	
1992	Gustavus Adolphus	62–49	St. Thomas	
1993	St. Thomas	57–56	Saint John's	
1994	St. Thomas	66–63	Saint John's	
1995	St. Thomas	80–69	Saint John's	
1996	Concordia Moorhead	47–43	Gustavus Adolphus	
1997	Gustavus Adolphus	57–55	Carleton	
1998	Gustavus Adolphus	66–62	St. Thomas	
1999	Gustavus Adolphus	66–64	Augsburg	
2000	Saint John's	78–64	St. Thomas	
2001	Saint John's	92–80	Gustavus Adolphus	Collegeville, MN
2002	St. Thomas	73–61	Bethel	St. Paul, MN
2003	Gustavus Adolphus	62–36	St. Thomas	St. Paul, MN
2004	Gustavus Adolphus	75–69	Macalester	St. Peter, MN
2005	Gustavus Adolphus	68–58	St. Thomas	St. Peter, MN
2006	St. Thomas	54–47	Carleton	St. Paul, MN
2007	St. Thomas	75–49	Saint John's	St. Paul, MN
2008	St. Thomas	76–73	Gustavus Adolphus	St. Paul, MN
2009	St. Thomas	68–51	Bethel	St. Paul, MN
2010	Carleton	78–71 (OT)	Gustavus Adolphus	St. Peter, MN
2011	St. Thomas	83–77	Gustavus Adolphus	St. Paul, MN
2012	St. Thomas	66–62 (OT)	Gustavus Adolphus	St. Paul, MN
2013	St. Thomas	92–65	Augsburg	St. Paul, MN
2014	St. Olaf	63–54	St. Thomas	St. Paul, MN
2015	St. Thomas	66–63	Bethel	St. Paul, MN
2016	St. Olaf	72–66	St. Thomas	St. Paul, MN
2017	Bethel	79–75	Saint John's	Arden Hills, MN
2018	Augsburg	81–69	Bethel	Arden Hills, MN
2019	Saint John's	82–79	Augsburg	Collegeville, MN
2020	Saint John's	82–63	St. Thomas	Collegeville, MN
2021	Cancelled due to the COVID-19 pandemic			
2022	Saint John's	75–71	Macalester	Collegeville, MN
2023	Carleton	86–76	Saint John's	Northfield, MN
2024	Gustavus Adolphus	85–80	Bethel (MN)	St. Peter, MN
2025	Saint John's	74–59	Carleton	Collegeville, MN
2026	Gustavus Adolphus	75–66	Saint John's	St. Peter, MN

== Championship records ==
Schools that are no longer MIAC members, as of the next college basketball season in 2024–25, are highlighted in pink.

School	Finals Record	Finals Appearances	Years
St. Thomas	13–9	22	1990, 1993, 1994, 1995, 2002, 2006, 2007, 2008, 2009, 2011, 2012, 2013, 2015
Gustavus Adolphus	11–8	19	1987, 1989, 1992, 1997, 1998, 1999, 2003, 2004, 2005, 2024, 2026
Saint John's	9–9	18	1985, 1986, 1988, 2000, 2001, 2019, 2020, 2022, 2025
Bethel	2–6	8	1991, 2017
Carleton	2–3	5	2010, 2023
St. Olaf	2–0	2	2014, 2016
Augsburg	1–3	4	2018
Concordia Moorhead	1–0	1	1996
Macalester	0–2	2	
Hamline	0–1	1	

- Saint Mary's and St. Scholastica have not yet qualified for the tournament finals.
- Teams highlighted in pink are former MIAC members

== See also ==
- NCAA Men's Division III Basketball Championship
