= Williams Fieldhouse =

Multi-purpose arena in Platteville, Wisconsin

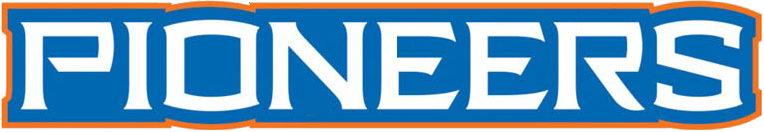
- Interactive map of Williams Fieldhouse
- Address: 350 Jay St; Platteville, Wisconsin
- Coordinates: 42.7313033°N 90.490801°W
- Capacity: 2,300
- Type: Arena
- Current use: Basketball; Volleyball; Wrestling
- Public transit: Green Orange; Platteville Public Transportation

Construction
- Opened: 1962; 64 years ago

Tenants
- Wisconsin–Platteville Pioneers (NCAA) teams: basketball, volleyball, wrestling

Website
- letsgopioneers.com/williams-fieldhouse

Williams Fieldhouse is a 2,300-seat multi-purpose arena on the campus of xxxxxxxx in Platteville, Wisconsin. It is home to the NCAA Division III Wisconsin–Platteville Pioneers basketball, volleyball, and wrestling teams.

Opened in 1962, the arena was named for William H. Williams (1897-1939), a mathematics professor who served for over 40 years at the institution. Williams was also chairman of the Athletic Committee and Boards for 35 years.

The playing surface was named "Bo Ryan Court" in 2007 in honor of Bo Ryan, the coach at UW-Platteville from 1984 to 1999, who led the Pioneers to four national titles. He later coached the UW-Madison basketball team.
