= SUNYAC men's basketball tournament =

- Conference basketball championship
- Sport: Basketball
- Conference: State University of New York Athletic Conference
- Number of teams: 8
- Format: Single-elimination tournament
- Played: 1980–present
- Current champion: Cortland (5th)
- Most championships: Buffalo State (15)
- Official website: SUNYAC men's basketball

Host stadiums
- Campus gyms (2007–present); Utica Memorial Auditorium (1998–2006); Campus gyms (1980–1997)

Host locations
- Campus sites (2007–present); Utica, NY (1998–2006); Campus sites (1980–1997)

The SUNYAC men's basketball tournament is the annual conference basketball championship tournament for the NCAA Division III State University of New York Athletic Conference. The tournament has been held annually since 1980. It is a single-elimination tournament and seeding is based on regular season records.

The winner receives the SUNYAC's automatic bid to the NCAA Men's Division III Basketball Championship.

== Results ==
Year	Champions	Score	Runner-up	Venue
1980	Potsdam	50–45	Buffalo	Buffalo, NY
1981	Albany	60–59	Potsdam	Potsdam, NY
1982	Buffalo	82–70	Potsdam	Buffalo, NY
1983	Potsdam	94–60	Buffalo State	Potsdam, NY
1984	Buffalo State	74–62	Buffalo	Buffalo, NY
1985	Buffalo State	73–64	Albany	Albany, NY
1986	Potsdam	77–59	Buffalo State	Buffalo, NY
1987	Potsdam	80–61	Buffalo State	Potsdam, NY
1988	Buffalo State	71–69	Geneseo	Buffalo, NY
1989	Buffalo State	67–65	Potsdam	Potsdam, NY
1990	Buffalo State	76–58	Potsdam	Buffalo, NY
1991	Buffalo State	77–67	Oneonta	Potsdam, NY
1992	Buffalo State	61–58	Fredonia	Buffalo, NY
1993	Fredonia	57–54	Binghamton	Binghamton, NY
1994	Brockport	86–78	Binghamton	Buffalo, NY
1995	Buffalo State	58–56	Plattsburgh	Cortland, NY
1996	Buffalo State	75–53	New Paltz	Geneseo, NY
1997	Buffalo State	59–43	Cortland	Cortland, NY
1998	Geneseo	63–61	Oswego	Utica, NY
1999	Geneseo	67–55	Cortland	Utica, NY
2000	Cortland	70–55	Brockport	Utica, NY
2001	Brockport	69–63	Cortland	Utica, NY
2002	Brockport	92–78	Oswego	Utica, NY
2003	Buffalo State	73–40	New Paltz	Utica, NY
2004	Potsdam	84–76	Brockport	Utica, NY
2005	Potsdam	74–61	Oswego	Utica, NY
2006	Plattsburgh	94–73	SUNYIT	Utica, NY
2007	Plattsburgh	80–75	Brockport	Brockport, NY
2008	Plattsburgh	89–75	Oswego	Plattsburgh, NY
2009	Brockport	64–59	Fredonia	Oswego, NY
2010	Plattsburgh	67–60	Oneonta	Plattsburgh, NY
2011	Buffalo State	67–50	Brockport	Oswego, NY
2012	Oswego	66–57	Cortland	Oswego, NY
2013	Cortland	75–61	Plattsburgh	Cortland, NY
2014	Brockport	57–56	Plattsburgh	Brockport, NY
2015	Oswego	70–58	Plattsburgh	Plattsburgh, NY
2016	Cortland	77–74	Oswego	Plattsburgh, NY
2017	Oswego	75–70	Oneonta	Oswego, NY
2018	Plattsburgh	93–80	Oneonta	Plattsburgh, NY
2019	Oswego	55–50	Brockport	Oswego, NY
2020	Brockport	102–75	Potsdam	Brockport, NY
2021	Cancelled due to COVID-19 pandemic			
2022	Oswego	81–60	Oneonta	Oswego, NY
2023	Oswego	74–63	Brockport	Oswego, NY
2024	New Paltz	85–80	Oswego	Oswego, NY
2025	Cortland	61–52	New Paltz	New Paltz, NY
2026	Cortland	84–51	Oswego	Cortland, NY

== Championship records ==
School	Finals record	Finals appearances	Years
Buffalo State	12–3	15	1984, 1985, 1988, 1989, 1990, 1991, 1992, 1995, 1996, 1997, 2003, 2011
Oswego	6–7	13	2012, 2015, 2017, 2019, 2021, 2023
Brockport	6–7	13	1994, 2001, 2002, 2009, 2014, 2020
Potsdam	6–5	11	1980, 1983, 1986, 1987, 2004, 2005
Cortland	5–4	9	2000, 2013, 2016, 2025, 2026
Plattsburgh	5–4	9	2006, 2007, 2008, 2010, 2018
Geneseo	2–1	3	1998, 1999
New Paltz	1–3	4	2024
Fredonia	1–2	3	1993
Oneonta	0–5	5	
Buffalo	1–2	3	1982
Albany	1–1	2	1981
Binghamton	0–2	2	
SUNYIT	0–1	1	

- Canton and Morrisville have not yet qualified for the SUNYAC tournament finals.
- Schools highlighted in pink are former members of the SUNYAC
