= Presidents' Athletic Conference men's basketball tournament =

- Conference basketball championship
- Sport: Basketball
- Conference: Presidents' Athletic Conference
- Format: Single-elimination tournament
- Current champion: Washington & Jefferson (2nd)
- Official website: Presidents' men's basketball

Host stadiums
- Campus arenas (2002–present)

Host locations
- Campus sites (2002–present)

The Presidents' Athletic Conference men's basketball tournament is the annual conference basketball championship tournament for the NCAA Division III Presidents' Athletic Conference. It is a single-elimination tournament and seeding is based on regular season records.

The winner, declared conference champion, receives the PAC's automatic bid to the NCAA Men's Division III Basketball Championship.

== Results ==
- Record is incomplete prior to 2002

Year	Champions	Score	Runner-up	Venue
2002	Bethany	89–74	Grove City	Bethany, WV
2003	Grove City	60–59	Thiel	Greenville, PA
2004	Westminster	97–88	Bethany	New Wilmington, PA
2005	Bethany	94–78	Washington & Jefferson	Bethany, WV
2006	Bethany	95–64	Waynesburg	Bethany, WV
2007	Grove City	60–58	Washington & Jefferson	Washington, PA
2008	Bethany	90–76	Washington & Jefferson	Bethany, WV
2009	Thomas More	91–65	Bethany	Crestview Hills, KY
2010	Grove City	78–61	Thomas More	Grove City, PA
2011	Bethany	74–67	Thiel	Greenville, PA
2012	Bethany	58–53	Thomas More	Bethany, WV
2013	Saint Vincent	81–67	Thomas More	Latrobe, PA
2014	Saint Vincent	90–84	Thomas More	Crestview Hills, KY
2015	Saint Vincent	72–66	Waynesburg	Latrobe, PA
2016	Saint Vincent	65–62	Thomas More	Latrobe, PA
2017	Thomas More	79–78	Saint Vincent	Latrobe, PA
2018	Thomas More	78–73	Bethany	Crestview Hills, KY
2019	Chatham	64–61	Westminster	New Wilmington, PA
2020	Grove City	86–70	Geneva	Grove City, PA
2021	Westminster	73–62	Grove City	New Wilmington, PA
2022	Washington & Jefferson	68–63	Chatham	Washington, PA
2023	Chatham	76–73	Allegheny	Meadville, PA
2024	Geneva	83–63	Saint Vincent	Beaver Falls, PA
2025	Chatham	81–69	Washington & Jefferson	Pittsburgh, PA
2026	Washington & Jefferson	68–61	Westminster	Washington, PA

== Championship records ==
- Results incomplete before 2002

School	Finals Record	Finals Appearances	Years
Bethany	6–3	9	2002, 2005, 2006, 2008, 2011, 2012
Grove City	4–2	6	2003, 2007, 2010, 2020
Saint Vincent	4–2	6	2013, 2014, 2015, 2016
Thomas More	3–5	8	2009, 2017, 2018
Chatham	3–1	4	2019, 2023, 2025
Washington & Jefferson	2–4	6	2022, 2026
Westminster	2–2	4	2004, 2021
Geneva	1–1	2	2024
Waynesburg	0–2	2	
Thiel	0–2	2	
Allegheny	0–1	1	

- Franciscan and Hiram have not yet qualified for the tournament final. During the existence of the PAC tournament, Hiram has only been a member since 2025–26; it had been a member from 1971–1989.
- Saint Francis will play its first PAC season in 2026–27.
- Schools highlighted in pink are former members of the PAC.
