= American Southwest Conference men's basketball tournament =

- Conference basketball championship
- Sport: Basketball
- Conference: American Southwest Conference
- Number of teams: 8
- Format: Single-elimination tournament
- Played: 1999–present
- Current champion: Mary Hardin–Baylor (4th)
- Most championships: Mississippi College (5); UT Dallas (5)
- Official website: ASC men's basketball

The American Southwest Conference men's basketball tournament is the annual conference basketball championship tournament for the NCAA Division III American Southwest Conference. The tournament has been held annually since 1999. It is a single-elimination tournament and seeding is based on regular season records.

The winner, declared conference champion, receives the ASC's automatic bid to the NCAA Men's Division III Basketball Championship.

Mary Hardin–Baylor are the reigning tournament champions.

== Results ==
Year	Champions	Score	Runner-up	Venue
1999	Mississippi College	69–54	Austin	Clinton, MS
2000	McMurry	105–81	Mississippi College	Abilene, TX
2001	McMurry	76–71	Mississippi College	Clinton, MS
2002	Mississippi College	88–75	McMurry	Abilene, TX
2003	Mississippi College	83–63	McMurry	Marshall, TX
2004	Sul Ross State	72–69	Mississippi College	Alpine, TX
2005	UT Dallas	73–55	Mississippi College	Clinton, MS
2006	Mississippi College	74–58	Howard Payne	Brownwood, TX
2007	Mississippi College	77–64	Hardin–Simmons	Clinton, MS
2008	Mary Hardin–Baylor	82–73	Concordia Texas	Belton, TX
2009	UT Dallas	85–72	Mississippi College	Richardson, TX
2010	Mary Hardin–Baylor	80–70	UT Dallas	Belton, TX
2011	McMurry	72–65	Mary Hardin–Baylor	Richardson, TX
2012	McMurry	86–81^{OT}	Hardin–Simmons	Belton, TX
2013	Concordia Texas	80–76	Mary Hardin–Baylor	Richardson, TX
2014	UT Dallas	78–69	Hardin–Simmons	Richardson, TX
2015	East Texas Baptist	82–71	Concordia Texas	Marshall, TX
2016	Hardin–Simmons	91–79	Louisiana College	Alpine, TX
2017	Hardin–Simmons	104–92	LeTourneau	Longview, TX
2018	Sul Ross State	68–65	East Texas Baptist	Alpine, TX
2019	UT Dallas	88–64	Hardin–Simmons	Richardson, TX
2020	LeTourneau	82–79	East Texas Baptist	Alpine, TX
2021	Ozarks	74–72	Louisiana College	Clarksville, AR
2022	Mary Hardin–Baylor	99–82	LeTourneau	Belton, TX
2023	East Texas Baptist	72–64	Hardin–Simmons	Belton, TX
2024	UT Dallas	78–77	Mary Hardin-Baylor	Abilene, TX
2025	Hardin–Simmons	73–62	Mary Hardin-Baylor	Marshall, TX
2026	Mary Hardin-Baylor	90–81	Hardin–Simmons	Abilene, TX

== Championship records ==
School	Finals Record	Finals Appearances	Years
Mississippi College	5–5	10	1999, 2002, 2003, 2006, 2007
UT Dallas	5–1	6	2005, 2009, 2014, 2019, 2024
Mary Hardin–Baylor	4–4	8	2008, 2010, 2022, 2026
McMurry	4–2	6	2000, 2001, 2011, 2012
Hardin–Simmons	3–5	8	2016, 2017, 2025
East Texas Baptist	2–2	4	2015, 2023
Sul Ross State	2–0	2	2004, 2018
Concordia Texas	1–2	3	2013
LeTourneau	1–2	3	2020
University of the Ozarks	1–0	1	2021
Louisiana Christian (Louisiana College)	0–2	1	
Austin	0–1	1	
Howard Payne	0–1	1	

- Belhaven, Dallas, Centenary, Schreiner, Texas Lutheran, and UT Tyler never reached the tournament finals before departing the ASC
- Schools highlighted in pink are former members of the American Southwest Conference
