= Coast to Coast Athletic Conference men's basketball tournament =

Men's Basketball Tournament

- Conference basketball championship
- Sport: Basketball
- Conference: Coast to Coast Athletic Conference
- Number of teams: 6
- Format: Single-elimination tournament
- Played: 1991–present
- Current champion: Mary Washington (4th)
- Most championships: Catholic (7)
- Official website: C2C men's basketball

The Coast to Coast Athletic Conference men's basketball tournament is the annual conference basketball championship tournament for the NCAA Division III Coast to Coast Athletic Conference (C2C), known before November 2020 as the Capital Athletic Conference. The tournament has been held annually since 1991. It is a single-elimination tournament and seeding is based on regular-season records.

The tournament winner receives C2C's automatic bid to the NCAA Division III Men's Basketball Championship.

== Results ==
=== Capital Athletic Conference ===
Year	Champions	Score	Runner-up	Venue
1991	St. Mary's (MD)	85–84	Marymount	Arlington, VA
1992	Marymount	101–94	Catholic	Washington, DC
1993	Catholic	76–70	York (PA)	York, PA
1994	Goucher	86–78	York (PA)	Towson, MD
1995	Goucher	82–72	York (PA)	York, PA
1996	Salisbury State	93–81	Marymount	Salisbury, MD
1997	Goucher	83–67	Salisbury State	Towson, MD
1998	Catholic	74–73	Goucher	Washington, DC
1999	Goucher	77–73	Catholic	Towson, MD
2000	Marymount	70–46	Goucher	Arlington, VA
2001	Catholic	61–59	Marymount	Washington, DC
2002	Catholic	64–56	Marymount	Washington, DC
2003	Mary Washington	70–68	Catholic	Washington, DC
2004	Catholic	81–72	Mary Washington	Fredericksburg, VA
2005	York (PA)	73–62	Catholic	York, PA
2006	Catholic	79–70	Salisbury	Washington, DC
2007	Catholic	85–75	Hood	Frederick, MD
2008	St. Mary's (MD)	82–72	Mary Washington	Fredericksburg, VA
2009	Wesley	64–51	Marymount	Dover, DE
2010	St. Mary's (MD)	80–76	Wesley	St. Mary's City, MD
2011	St. Mary's (MD)	97–65	Wesley	St. Mary's City, MD
2012	York (PA)	59–51	Mary Washington	Fredericksburg, VA
2013	St. Mary's (MD)	79–78^{OT}	Wesley	St. Mary's City, MD
2014	Mary Washington	65–48	Christopher Newport	Fredericksburg, VA
2015	Salisbury	58–57	Christopher Newport	Salisbury, MD
2016	Christopher Newport	68–67^{OT}	Salisbury	Newport News, VA
2017	Christopher Newport	63–62	Salisbury	Newport News, VA
2018	York (PA)	82–73	Christopher Newport	Newport News, VA
2019	Christopher Newport	78–56	York (PA)	Newport News, VA
2020	York (PA)	79–77	Christopher Newport	Newport News, VA

=== Coast to Coast Athletic Conference ===
Year	Champions	Score	Runner-up	Venue
2021	Canceled due to the COVID-19 pandemic			
2022	Christopher Newport	80–69	Mary Washington	Newport News, VA
2023	Christopher Newport	65–52	Mary Washington	Santa Cruz, CA
2024	Christopher Newport	62–56	Mary Washington	Newport News, VA
2025	Mary Washington	71–66	Christopher Newport	Salisbury, MD
2026	Mary Washington	88–58	Christopher Newport	Santa Cruz, CA

== Championship records ==
School	Finals Record	Finals Appearances	Years
Catholic	7–4	11	1993, 1998, 2001, 2002, 2004, 2006, 2007
Christopher Newport	6–6	12	2016, 2017, 2019, 2022, 2023, 2024
St. Mary's (MD)	5–0	5	1991, 2008, 2010, 2011, 2013
Mary Washington	4–6	12	2003, 2014, 2025, 2026
York (PA)	4–4	8	2005, 2012, 2018, 2020
Goucher	4–2	6	1994, 1995, 1997, 1999
Salisbury	2–4	6	1996, 2015
Marymount	2–5	7	1992, 2000
Wesley	1–3	4	2009
Hood	0–1	1	

- Finlandia, Frostburg State, Gallaudet, Penn State–Harrisburg, Pine Manor, Pratt, Southern Virginia, and Stevenson never reached the tournament finals as either CAC or C2C members.
- Johnson & Wales (NC), Regent, UC Santa Cruz and Warren Wilson have not yet reached the C2C tournament finals.
- Schools highlighted in pink are former CAC/C2C members.
