= New Jersey Athletic Conference men's basketball tournament =

- Conference basketball championship
- Sport: Basketball
- Conference: New Jersey Athletic Conference
- Number of teams: 6
- Format: Single-elimination tournament
- Played: 2003–present
- Current champion: TCNJ (3rd)
- Most championships: Stockton (6)
- Official website: NJAC men's basketball

The New Jersey Athletic Conference men's basketball tournament is the annual conference basketball championship tournament for the NCAA Division III New Jersey Athletic Conference. The tournament has been held annually since 2003. It is a single-elimination tournament and seeding is based on regular season records.

The winner receives the NJAC's automatic bid to the NCAA Men's Division III Basketball Championship.

== Results ==
Year	Champions	Score	Runner-up	Venue
2003	Montclair State	86–84 (2OT)	Ramapo	Ramapo Athletic Center (Mahwah, NJ)
2004	New Jersey City	88–75	Rowan	Athletic & Fitness Center (Jersey City, NJ)
2005	Ramapo	79–71	Richard Stockton	Bill Bradley Center (Mahwah, NJ)
2006	William Paterson	67–58	Ramapo	William Paterson Rec Center (Wayne, NJ)
2007	Ramapo	83–81 (OT)	New Jersey City	John J. Moore Athletics Center (Jersey City, NJ)
2008	Richard Stockton	67–66	William Paterson	Stockton Sports Center (Pomona, NJ)
2009	Richard Stockton	62–54	Rutgers–Newark	Stockton Sports Center (Pomona, NJ)
2010	William Paterson	70–58	Richard Stockton	William Paterson Rec Center (Wayne, NJ)
2011	New Jersey City	72–67	Montclair State	John J. Moore Athletics Center (Jersey City, NJ)
2012	William Paterson	67–63	Richard Stockton	Stockton Sports Center (Pomona, NJ)
2013	Ramapo	67–65	Rutgers–Newark	Bill Bradley Center (Mahwah, NJ)
2014	Richard Stockton	65–44	William Paterson	Stockton Sports Center (Pomona, NJ)
2015	Stockton	65–61	William Paterson	Stockton Sports Center (Pomona, NJ)
2016	Stockton	60–53	TCNJ	Stockton Sports Center (Pomona, NJ)
2017	Ramapo	67–64	New Jersey City	Bill Bradley Center (Mahwah, NJ)
2018	Ramapo	67–59	William Paterson	Bill Bradley Center (Mahwah, NJ)
2019	Rowan	80–77	New Jersey City	John J. Moore Athletics Center (Jersey City, NJ)
2020	TCNJ	75–60	Stockton	Packer Hall (Ewing, NJ)
2021	New Jersey City	79–77	Stockton	John J. Moore Athletics Center (Jersey City, NJ)
2022	Stockton	95–91	Rowan	Sports Center (Galloway, NJ)
2023	Rowan	103–88	Stockton	Esby Gymnasium (Glassboro, NJ)
2024	TCNJ	75–62	Stockton	Sports Center (Galloway, NJ)
2025	Montclair State	91–85 (OT)	Ramapo	Panzer Athletic Center (Montclair, NJ)
2026	TCNJ	83–81	Montclair State	Panzer Athletic Center (Montclair, NJ)

== Championship records ==
School	Finals Record	Finals Appearances	Years
Stockton	6–7	13	2008, 2009, 2014, 2015, 2016, 2022
Ramapo	5–3	8	2005, 2007, 2013, 2017, 2018
New Jersey City	3–3	6	2004, 2011, 2021
William Patterson	3–4	7	2006, 2010, 2012
TCNJ	3–1	4	2020, 2024, 2026
Rowan	2–2	4	2019, 2023
Montclair State	2–2	4	2003, 2025
Rutgers–Newark	0–2	2	

- Kean and Rutgers–Camden have not yet qualified for the NJAC tournament finals

== See also ==
- NCAA Men's Division III Basketball Championship
