= Northern Athletics Collegiate Conference men's basketball tournament =

NACC men's basketball tournament
- Conference basketball championship
- Sport: Basketball
- Conference: Northern Athletics Collegiate Conference
- Number of teams: 6
- Format: Single-elimination tournament
- Played: 2007–present
- Current champion: Aurora (7th)
- Most championships: Aurora (7)
- Official website: NACC men's basketball

Host stadiums
- Campus arenas (2007–present)

Host locations
- Campus sites (2007–present)

The Northern Athletics Collegiate Conference men's basketball tournament is the annual conference basketball championship tournament for the NCAA Division III Northern Athletics Collegiate Conference. The tournament has been held annually since the NACC's foundation in 2007. It is a single-elimination tournament and seeding is based on regular season records.

The winner receives the NACC's automatic bid to the NCAA Men's Division III Basketball Championship.

== Results ==
Year	Champions	Score	Runner-up	Venue
2007	Aurora	85–69	Edgewood	Aurora, IL
2008	Lakeland	82–77 (OT)	Aurora	Aurora, IL
2009	Aurora	82–79	Wisconsin Lutheran	Aurora, IL
2010	Aurora	70–64	Dominican	Aurora, IL
2011	Benedictine	70–59	Edgewood	Lisle, IL
2012	Edgewood	80–72	Lakeland	Madison, WI
2013	Aurora	95–71	Lakeland	Plymouth, WI
2014	Marian	65–61	Edgewood	Fond du Lac, WI
2015	Concordia Wisconsin	73–71	Aurora	Aurora, IL
2016	Benedictine	83–57	MSOE	Lisle, IL
2017	Benedictine	93–89	Concordia Wisconsin	Lisle, IL
2018	Aurora	76–71	Benedictine	Aurora, IL
2019	Aurora	71–57	Illinois Tech	Milwaukee, WI
2020	Concordia Wisconsin	80–75 (OT)	MSOE	Mequon, WI
2021	Wisconsin Lutheran	78–71	Rockford	Milwaukee, WI
2022	Marian	77–71	Concordia Wisconsin	Mequon, WI
2023	St. Norbert	71–59	Wisconsin Lutheran	Wauwatosa, WI
2024	Wisconsin Lutheran	78–62	St. Norbert	Wauwatosa, WI
2025	Wisconsin Lutheran	70–52	St. Norbert	Wauwatosa, WI
2026	Aurora	67–66	Marian	Aurora, IL

== Championship records ==
School	Finals Record	Finals Appearances	Years
Aurora	7–2	9	2007, 2009, 2010, 2013, 2018, 2019
Wisconsin Lutheran	3–2	5	2021, 2024, 2025
Benedictine	3–1	4	2011, 2016, 2017
Concordia Wisconsin	2–2	4	2015, 2020
Marian	2–1	3	2014, 2022
Edgewood	1–3	4	2012
Lakeland	1–2	3	2008
St. Norbert	1–2	3	2023
MSOE	0–2	2	
Dominican	0–1	1	
Illinois Tech	0–1	1	
Rockford	0–1	1	

- Concordia Chicago have not yet qualified for the NACC tournament finals.
- Maranatha Baptist never qualified for the tournament finals as NACC members

== See also ==
- NCAA Men's Division III Basketball Championship
