= Little East Conference men's basketball tournament =

- Conference basketball championship
- Sport: Basketball
- Conference: Little East Conference
- Number of teams: 8
- Format: Single-elimination tournament
- Played: 1987–present
- Current champion: Western Connecticut (7th)
- Most championships: UMass Dartmouth (12)
- Official website: Little East men's basketball

The Little East Conference men's basketball tournament is the annual conference basketball championship tournament for the NCAA Division III Little East Conference. The tournament has been held annually since 1987. It is a single-elimination tournament and seeding is based on regular conference season records.

The winner receives the Little East's automatic bid to the NCAA Men's Division III Basketball Championship.

== Results ==
Year	Champions	Score	Runner-up
1987	SE Massachusetts	73–58	Southern Maine
1988	SE Massachusetts	92–84	Southern Maine
1989	Southern Maine	84–66	Plymouth State
1990	SE Massachusetts	73–71	Southern Maine
1991	SE Massachusetts	86–83	Southern Maine
1992	Eastern Connecticut	71–64	UMass Dartmouth
1993	UMass Dartmouth	87–73	Eastern Connecticut
1994	UMass Dartmouth	93–86	Plymouth State
1995	UMass Dartmouth	101–80	Western Connecticut
1996	Western Connecticut	80–64	Plymouth State
1997	UMass Dartmouth	69–66	UMass Boston
1998	UMass Dartmouth	65–62	Keene State
1999	Western Connecticut	92–60	Plymouth State
2000	Eastern Connecticut	73–66	Southern Maine
2001	UMass Dartmouth	99–89 (OT)	Keene State
2002	Western Connecticut	86–83	Keene State
2003	Western Connecticut	66–65	Plymouth State
2004	Keene State	79–67	Plymouth State
2005	Western Connecticut	135–130 (2OT)	Plymouth State
2006	UMass Boston	81–67	Keene State
2007	Rhode Island College	87–75	Keene State
2008	Rhode Island College	55–52	UMass Dartmouth
2009	UMass Dartmouth	62–53	Rhode Island College
2010	Rhode Island College	81–80	Western Connecticut
2011	Rhode Island College	62–49	Eastern Connecticut
2012	Eastern Connecticut	82–60	Rhode Island College
2013	Rhode Island College	60–53	Keene State
2014	Rhode Island College	70–61	Eastern Connecticut
2015	Keene State	75–57	Rhode Island College
2016	Keene State	86–81	UMass Dartmouth
2017	Eastern Connecticut	72–70	Keene State
2018	Eastern Connecticut	79–62	Keene State
2019	Keene State	72–69	Eastern Connecticut
2020	Western Connecticut	88–75	UMass Dartmouth≠
2021	UMass Dartmouth	108–68	Keene State
2022	Keene State	71–69 (OT)	UMass Dartmouth
2023	Keene State	83–79	Western Connecticut
2024	Keene State	84–68	Western Connecticut
2025	Keene State	80–67	Western Connecticut
2026	Western Connecticut	84–68	Keene State

== Championship records ==
School	Finals Record	Finals Appearances	Years
UMass Dartmouth (Southeastern Massachusetts)	12–5	17	1987, 1988, 1990, 1991, 1993, 1994, 1995, 1997, 1998, 2001, 2009, 2021
Keene State	8–10	18	2004, 2015, 2016, 2019, 2022, 2023, 2024, 2025
Western Connecticut	7–5	12	1996, 1999, 2002, 2003, 2005, 2020, 2026
Rhode Island College	6–3	9	2007, 2008, 2010, 2011, 2013, 2014
Eastern Connecticut	5–3	8	1992, 2000, 2012, 2017, 2018
UMass Boston	1–1	2	2006
Southern Maine	1–5	6	1989
Plymouth State	0–7	7	

- Castleton has not yet qualified for the tournament finals.

== See also ==
- NCAA Men's Division III Basketball Championship
