= Liberty League men's basketball tournament =

- Conference basketball championship
- Sport: Basketball
- Conference: Liberty League
- Format: Single-elimination tournament
- Current champion: Vassar (2nd)
- Most championships: Skidmore (5)
- Official website: Liberty League men's basketball

Host locations
- Campus sites (2004–present)

The Liberty League men's basketball tournament is the annual conference basketball championship tournament for the NCAA Division III Liberty League. It is a single-elimination tournament and seeding is based on regular season records.

As conference champion, the winner receives the Liberty League's automatic bid to the NCAA Men's Division III Basketball Championship.

== Results ==
- Tournament results incomplete before 2004

Year	Champions	Score	Runner-up	Venue
2004	Hamilton	104–93	RPI	Clinton, NY
2005	Union	88–84	Hamilton	Geneva, NY
2006	Hamilton	107–72	Union	Clinton, NY
2007	St. Lawrence	65–64	Hamilton	Clinton, NY
2008	Clarkson	58–53	Hamilton	Canton, NY
2009	RPI	72–65	St. Lawrence	Canton, NY
2010	St. Lawrence	109–90	Hobart	Canton, NY
2011	Skidmore	68–52	Hamilton	Geneva, NY
2012	Skidmore	69–66	Hobart	Geneva, NY
2013	Hobart	72–63	RPI	Geneva, NY
2014	Hobart	75–74	Vassar	Geneva, NY
2015	Skidmore	68–64	Clarkson	Saratoga Springs, NY
2016	Skidmore	72–68	St. Lawrence	Saratoga Springs, NY
2017	Union	71–67	Hobart	Schenectady, NY
2018	Union	82–65	Skidmore	Geneva, NY
2019	Skidmore	82–66	Hobart	Saratoga Springs, NY
2020	Ithaca	80–69 (OT)	RPI	Troy, NY
2021	Cancelled due to COVID-19 pandemic			
2022	Vassar	65–48	Skidmore	Troy, NY
2023	St. Lawrence	50–42 (OT)	RPI	Canton, NY
2024	Hobart	63–55	St. Lawrence	Geneva, NY
2025	Ithaca	72–67	RPI	Troy, NY
2026	Vassar	57–53	RPI	Troy, NY

== Championship records ==
- Results incomplete before 2004

School	Finals Record	Finals Appearances	Years
Skidmore	5–2	7	2011, 2012, 2015, 2016, 2019
Hobart	3–4	7	2013, 2014, 2024
St. Lawrence	3–3	6	2007, 2010, 2023
Union	3–1	4	2005, 2017, 2018
Hamilton	2–4	6	2004, 2006
Vassar	2–1	3	2022, 2026
Ithaca	2–0	2	2020, 2025
RPI	1–6	7	2009
Clarkson	1–1	2	2008

- Schools highlighted in pink are former members of the Liberty League
- Bard, Rochester, and RIT have not yet qualified for the Liberty League tournament finals

== See also ==
- NCAA Men's Division III Basketball Championship
