= AMCC men's basketball tournament =

Allegheny Mountain Collegiate Conference men's basketball tournament
- Conference basketball championship
- Sport: Basketball
- Conference: Allegheny Mountain Collegiate Conference
- Number of teams: 6
- Format: Single-elimination tournament
- Played: 1998–present
- Current champion: Penn State Behrend (7th)
- Most championships: Penn State Behrend (7)
- Official website: AMCC men's basketball

The Allegheny Mountain Collegiate Conference men's basketball tournament is the annual conference basketball championship tournament for the NCAA Division III Allegheny Mountain Collegiate Conference. The tournament has been held annually since the AMCC was founded in 1998. It is a single-elimination tournament and seeding is based on regular season records.

The winner receives the AMCC's automatic bid to the NCAA Men's Division III Basketball Championship.

== Results ==
| Year | Champions | Score | Runner-up | Venue |
|---|---|---|---|---|
| 1998 | Penn State Behrend | 76–63 | Frostburg State | Bradford, PA |
| 1999 | Pitt–Greensburg | 79–77 | La Roche | Erie, PA |
| 2000 | Pitt–Greensburg | 49–43 | Penn State Behrend | Erie, PA |
| 2001 | Frostburg State | 77–73 | Pitt–Bradford | Bradford, PA |
| 2002 | Pitt–Bradford | 102–99 | Frostburg State | Bradford, PA |
| 2003 | Pitt–Bradford | 62–59 | Penn State Behrend | Erie, PA |
| 2004 | La Roche | 44–42 | Frostburg State | Erie, PA |
| 2005 | Penn State Behrend | 52–49 | Pitt–Bradford | Greensburg, PA |
| 2006 | Lake Erie | 83–82^{OT} | Pitt–Greensburg | Painesville, OH |
| 2007 | Lake Erie | 59–58 | Penn State Behrend | Painesville, OH |
| 2008 | Penn State Behrend | 57–54 | Lake Erie | Erie, PA |
| 2009 | Medaille | 82–71 | Penn State Behrend | Buffalo, NY |
| 2010 | Medaille | 89–77 | Penn State Behrend | Buffalo, NY |
| 2011 | La Roche | 55–53 | Penn State Behrend | Pittsburgh, PA |
| 2012 | Medaille | 65–52 | Penn State Behrend | Buffalo, NY |
| 2013 | Penn State Behrend | 63–60 | Medaille | Hamburg, NY |
| 2014 | Penn State Behrend | 66–51 | Hilbert | Erie, PA |
| 2015 | Medaille | 81–76 | Hilbert | Erie, PA |
| 2016 | Pitt–Greensburg | 76–74 | Hilbert | Hamburg, NY |
| 2017 | Medaille | 74–58 | La Roche | Buffalo, NY |
| 2018 | La Roche | 77–74 | Penn State Behrend | McCandless, PA |
| 2019 | Penn State Behrend | 67–65 | La Roche | McCandless, PA |
| 2020 | La Roche | 62–61 | Penn State Behrend | McCandless, PA |
| 2021 | Cancelled due to the COVID-19 pandemic | | | |
| 2022 | Medaille | 71–70 | La Roche | Erie, PA |
| 2023 | La Roche | 84–61 | Penn State Altoona | McCandless, PA |
| 2024 | La Roche | 80–69 | Penn State Behrend | McCandless, PA |
| 2025 | Pitt–Bradford | 92–90 | Penn State Altoona | Bradford, PA |
| 2026 | Penn State Behrend | 66–61 | Penn State Greensburg | Erie, PA |

== Championship records ==
| School | Finals Record | Finals Appearances | Years |
|---|---|---|---|
| Penn State Behrend | 7–10 | 17 | 1998, 2005, 2008, 2013, 2014, 2019, 2025 |
| La Roche | 6–4 | 10 | 2004, 2011, 2018, 2020, 2023, 2024 |
| Medaille | 6–1 | 7 | 2009, 2010, 2012, 2015, 2017, 2022 |
| Pitt–Bradford | 3–2 | 5 | 2002, 2003, 2025 |
| Pitt–Greensburg | 3–2 | 5 | 1999, 2000, 2016 |
| Lake Erie | 2–1 | 3 | 2006, 2007 |
| Frostburg State | 1–3 | 4 | 2001 |
| Hilbert | 0–3 | 3 | |
| Penn State Altoona | 0–2 | 2 | |

- Carlow and Mount Aloysius have not yet qualified for the tournament finals.
- Wells and Alfred State never qualified for the tournament finals as AMCC members.
- Schools highlighted in pink are former AMCC members.
