= Heartland Collegiate Athletic Conference men's basketball tournament =

- Conference basketball championship
- Sport: Basketball
- Conference: Heartland Collegiate Athletic Conference
- Number of teams: 6
- Format: Single-elimination tournament
- Played: 1999–present
- Current champion: Transylvania (5th)
- Most championships: Franklin (7)
- Official website: HCAC men's basketball

The Heartland Collegiate Athletic Conference men's basketball tournament is the annual conference basketball championship tournament for the NCAA Division III Heartland Collegiate Athletic Conference. The tournament has been held annually since 1999. It is a single-elimination tournament and seeding is based on regular conference season records.

The winner receives the HCAC's automatic bid to the NCAA Men's Division III Basketball Championship.

== Results ==
Year	Champions	Score	Runner-up	Site
1999	Franklin	80–71 (2OT)	Manchester	North Manchester, IN
2000	Franklin	70–58	Manchester	Franklin, IN
2001	Defiance	104–97	Manchester	North Manchester, IN
2002	Franklin	92–87	Defiance	Hanover, IN
2003	Hanover	79–60	Anderson	Hanover, IN
2004	Hanover	61–48	Franklin	Hanover, IN
2005	Hanover	66–56	Franklin	Hanover, IN
2006	Transylvania	63–48	Franklin	Lexington, KY
2007	Transylvania	77–64	Defiance	Franklin, IN
2008	Franklin	82–76	Defiance	Defiance, OH
2009	Transylvania	76–72	Franklin	Lexington, KY
2010	Defiance	70–65	Anderson	Anderson, IN
2011	Manchester	79–69	Hanover	North Manchester, IN
2012	Rose-Hulman	76–73 (OT)	Transylvania	Lexington, KY
2013	Rose-Hulman	64–59	Hanover	Terre Haute, IN
2014	Rose-Hulman	70–56	Hanover	Terre Haute, IN
2015	Defiance	78–55	Bluffton	Defiance, OH
2016	Mount St. Joseph	93–88 (OT)	Rose-Hulman	Defiance, OH
2017	Hanover	58–51	Mount St. Joseph	Hanover, IN
2018	Hanover	80–70	Rose-Hulman	Terre Haute, IN
2019	Hanover	76–73	Transylvania	Hanover, IN
2020	Transylvania	49–48	Rose–Hulman	Lexington, KY
2021	Franklin	73–54	Transylvania	Lexington, KY
2022	Franklin	91–84	Hanover	Hanover, IN
2023	Anderson	73–55	Rose–Hulman	North Manchester, IN
2024	Anderson	90–73	Hanover	Anderson, IN
2025	Franklin	72–66	Anderson	Anderson, IN
2026	Transylvania	91–79	Anderson	Lexington, KY

== Championship records ==
Schools highlighted in pink are former HCAC members, as of the upcoming 2024–25 season.

School	Finals Record	Finals Appearances	Years
Franklin	7–4	11	1999, 2000, 2002, 2008, 2021, 2022, 2025
Hanover	6–5	11	2003, 2004, 2005, 2017, 2018, 2019
Transylvania	5–3	8	2006, 2007, 2009, 2020, 2026
Defiance	3–3	6	2001, 2010, 2015
Rose-Hulman	3–4	7	2012, 2013, 2014
Anderson	2–4	6	2023, 2024
Manchester	1–3	4	2011
Mount St. Joseph	1–1	2	2016
Bluffton	0–1	1	

- Berea and Earlham has not yet qualified for the HCAC tournament finals
- Wabash and Wilmington (OH) never qualified for the tournament finals as members of the HCAC

== See also ==
- NCAA Men's Division III Basketball Championship
