= Anna Maria Amcats =

- University: Anna Maria College
- NCAA: NCAA Division III
- Conference: Massachusetts State Collegiate Athletic Conference
- Location: Paxton, Massachusetts
- Varsity teams: 13
- Football stadium: AMCAT Field
- Basketball arena: Fuller Activities Center
- Nickname: AMCATS
- Colors: Cardinal Red and White
- Mascot: AMCAT
- Fight song: None
- Website: www.goamcats.com
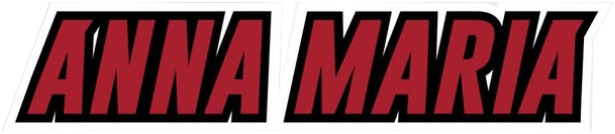

The Anna Maria Amcats was the nickname of the intercollegiate athletic teams of Anna Maria College, located in Paxton, Massachusetts. The school's teams participated in 13 intercollegiate sports at the NCAA Division III level.

The Amcats were formerly a member of the Great Northeast Athletic Conference (GNAC), and gained full membership of the Massachusetts State Collegiate Athletic Conference (MASCAC), effective as of the 2025-26 academic year.

All thirteen of Anna Maria's teams were members of the Massachusetts State Collegiate Athletic Conference (MASCAC). The AMCATS name is derived from the acronym Anna Maria College Athletic Team Sports.

All athletics programs at Anna Maria permanently ceased operations on May 10, 2026, when the college closed its doors for good due to financial hardships.

== Sports sponsored ==
Men's sports	Women's sports
Baseball	Basketball
Basketball	Field hockey
Football	Ice Hockey
Ice Hockey	Lacrosse
Lacrosse	Soccer
Soccer	Softball
	Volleyball
Co-ed sports
eSports

=== Football ===
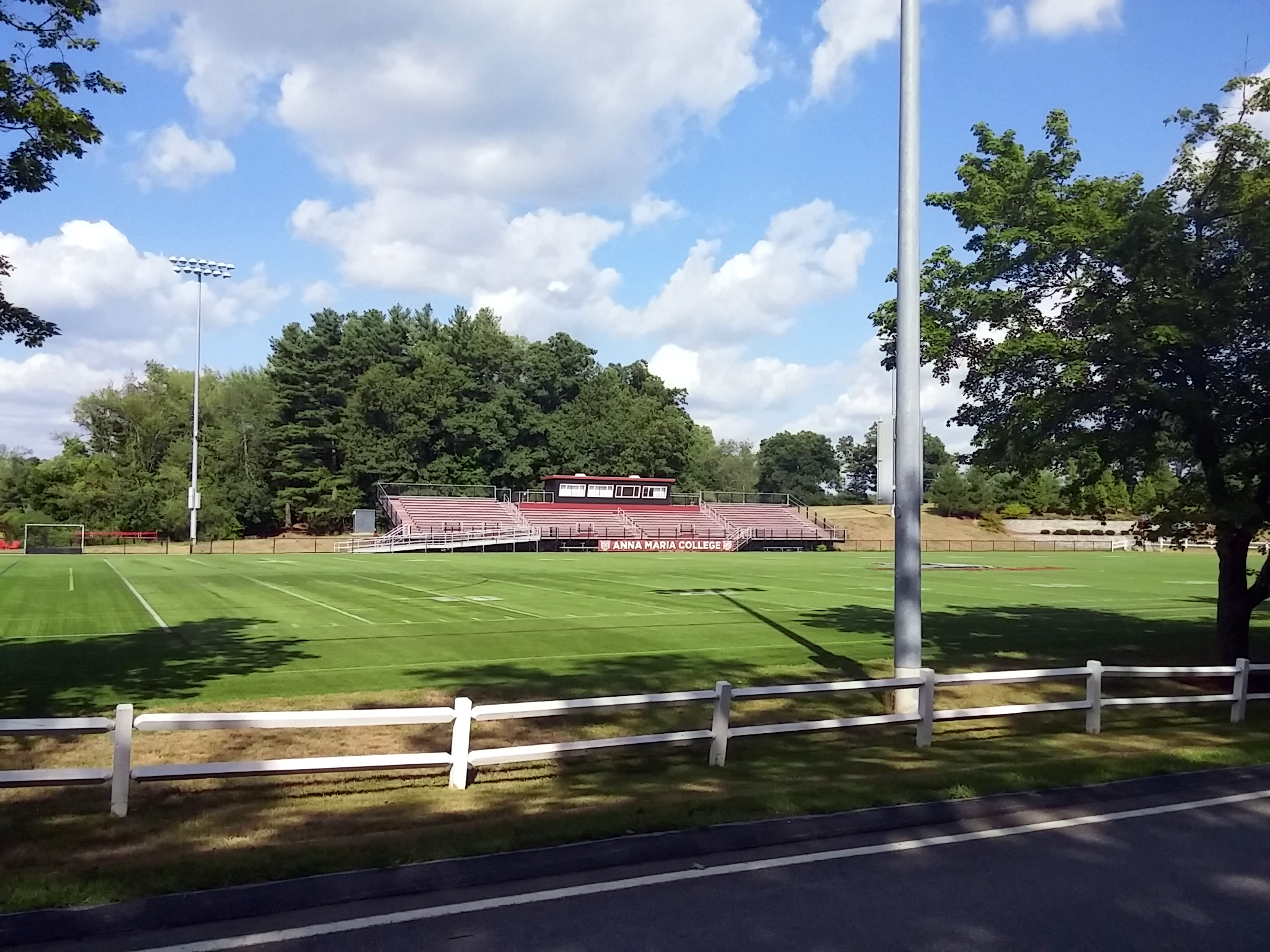
AMCAT Field

AMCATS football was one of the most recent additions to the Anna Maria Athletics arsenal. Founded in 2009, the team won its first and second football games at the end of the 2011 season. They won their first ECFC football championship on November 13, 2021 after going 7–2 in regular season play (5–1 in ECFC play) therefore receiving their first NCAA Division III Football Championship appearance. In their final regular season game of the year the Amcats defeated the SUNY Maritime Privateers 31–7. to clinch the ECFC title. The Amcats faced the Delaware Valley Rams on November 20, 2021 in the NCAA Division III Football Championship first round.

As of the 2025-26 academic year, AMCATS football was a member of the MASCAC.
