= MASCAC men's basketball tournament =

- Conference basketball championship
- Sport: Basketball
- Conference: Massachusetts State Collegiate Athletic Conference
- Number of teams: 6
- Format: Single-elimination tournament
- Played: 1990–present
- Current champion: Worcester State (4th)
- Most championships: Salem State (18)
- Official website: MASCAC men's basketball

Host stadiums
- Campus gyms (1990–present)

Host locations
- Campus sites (1990–present)

The MASCAC men's basketball tournament is the annual conference basketball championship tournament for the NCAA Division III Massachusetts State Collegiate Athletic Conference. The tournament has been held annually since 1990. It is a single-elimination tournament and seeding is based on regular season records.

As conference champion, the winner receives the MASCAC's automatic bid to the NCAA Men's Division III Basketball Championship.

== Results ==
=== Finals champion only ===
- Championship game results incomplete, 1990–2003

Year	Champions
1990	North Adams State
1991	Salem State
1992	Salem State
1993	Salem State
1994	Worcester State
1995	Salem State
1996	Salem State
1997	Salem State
1998	Salem State
1999	Bridgewater State
2000	Salem State
2001	Salem State
2002	Salem State
2003	Salem State

=== Full results ===
Year	Champions	Score	Runner-up
2004	Salem State	93–81	Bridgewater State
2005	Salem State	87–59	Framingham State
2006	Bridgewater State	59–46	Worcester State
2007	Salem State	72–62	Westfield State
2008	Salem State	82–62	Westfield State
2009	Bridgewater State	77–66	Salem State
2010	Bridgewater State	74–70 (OT)	Framingham State
2011	Bridgewater State	91–73	Salem State
2012	Salem State	83–71	Bridgewater State
2013	Fitchburg State	80–72	MCLA
2014	Bridgewater State	83–73	Salem State
2015	Westfield State	78–69	Bridgewater State
2016	Fitchburg State	82–78	Salem State
2017	Salem State	100–82	Worcester State
2018	Bridgewater State	77–72	Fitchburg State
2019	Salem State	66–57	Westfield State
2020	Westfield State	81–77	Worcester State
2021	Cancelled due to COVID-19 pandemic		
2022	Westfield State	80–66	Worcester State
2023	Worcester State	65–53	Westfield State
2024	Worcester State	80–79 (OT)	Bridgewater State
2025	Westfield State	93–63	Salem State
2026	Worcester State	73–71	Westfield State

== Championship records ==
- Results incomplete for 1990–2003

School	Finals Record	Finals Appearances	Years
Salem State	18–5	23	1991, 1992, 1993, 1995, 1996, 1997, 1998, 2000, 2001, 2002, 2003, 2004, 2005, 2007, 2008, 2012, 2017, 2019
Bridgewater State	7–4	11	1999, 2006, 2009, 2010, 2011, 2014, 2018
Westfield State	4–5	9	2015, 2020, 2022, 2025
Worcester State	4–4	8	1994, 2023, 2024, 2026
Fitchburg State	2–1	3	2013, 2016
MCLA; North Adams State	1–1	1	1990
Framingham State	0–2	2	

== See also ==
- NCAA Men's Division III Basketball Championship
