= Upper Midwest Athletic Conference men's basketball tournament =

American basketball championship

- Conference basketball championship
- Sport: Basketball
- Conference: Upper Midwest Athletic Conference
- Number of teams: 5
- Format: Single-elimination tournament
- Played: 1999–present
- Current champion: Bethany Lutheran (6th)
- Most championships: Northwestern–St. Paul (13)
- Official website: UMAC men's basketball

Host stadiums
- Campus gyms (1999–present)

Host locations
- Campus sites (1999–present)

The Upper Midwest Athletic Conference men's basketball tournament is the annual conference basketball championship tournament for the NCAA Division III Upper Midwest Athletic Conference. The tournament has been held annually since 1999. It is a single-elimination tournament and seeding is based on regular season records.

The winner receives the UMAC's automatic bid to the NCAA Men's Division III Basketball Championship.

== Results ==
=== Finals champion only ===
- Championship game results incomplete, 1999–2009

Year	Champions
1999	Mount Senario
2000	Martin Luther
2001	Northwestern–St. Paul
2002	Northwestern–St. Paul
2003	Presentation
2004	St. Scholastica
2005	Minnesota–Morris
2006	St. Scholastica
2007	St. Scholastica
2008	Northwestern–St. Paul
2009	St. Scholastica

=== Full results ===
Year	Champions	Score	Runner-up	Venue
2010	Minnesota–Morris	83–47	St. Scholastica	Morris, MN
2011	Northwestern–St. Paul	73–60	Minnesota–Morris	Roseville, MN
2012	Northwestern–St. Paul	60–44	Bethany Lutheran	Mankato, MN
2013	Northwestern–St. Paul	79–73	Bethany Lutheran	Roseville, MN
2014	Northwestern–St. Paul	73–52	Crown	Roseville, MN
2015	Northwestern–St. Paul	68–39	Minnesota–Morris	Roseville, MN
2016	Northwestern–St. Paul	93–70	St. Scholastica	Duluth, MN
2017	Northwestern–St. Paul	112–108 (4OT)	St. Scholastica	Roseville, MN
2018	Bethany Lutheran	96–90	Northwestern–St. Paul	Mankato, MN
2019	Northwestern–St. Paul	92–89	St. Scholastica	Roseville, MN
2020	Bethany Lutheran	92–82	St. Scholastica	Mankato, MN
2021	Northwestern–St. Paul	74–61	St. Scholastica	Duluth, MN
2022	Northwestern–St. Paul	85–69	Crown	Roseville, MN
2023	Bethany Lutheran	93–75	Wisconsin–Superior	Mankato, MN
2024	Bethany Lutheran	77–58	Wisconsin–Superior	Mankato, MN
2025	Bethany Lutheran	90–84 (OT)	Northwestern St. Paul	St. Paul, MN
2026	Bethany Lutheran	76–75	Minnesota–Morris	Morris, MN

== Championship records ==
- Results incomplete for 1999–2009

School	Finals Record	Finals Appearances	Years
Northwestern–St. Paul	13–2	15	2001, 2002, 2008, 2011, 2012, 2013, 2014, 2015, 2016, 2017, 2019, 2021, 2022
Bethany Lutheran	6–2	8	2018, 2020, 2023, 2024, 2025, 2026
St. Scholastica	4–6	10	2004, 2006, 2007, 2009
Minnesota–Morris	2–3	5	2005, 2010
Presentation	1–0	1	2003
Martin Luther	1–0	1	2000
Mount Senario	1–0	1	1999
Crown	0–2	2	
Wisconsin–Superior	0–2	2	

- Schools highlighted in pink are former members of the UMAC
- North Central (MN) and Northland have not yet qualified for the UMAC tournament finals
