= Ohio Athletic Conference men's basketball tournament =

- Conference basketball championship
- Sport: Basketball
- Conference: Ohio Athletic Conference
- Format: Single-elimination tournament
- Played: 1949, 1960–present
- Current champion: Heidelberg (2nd)
- Most championships: Wittenberg (14)
- Official website: OAC men's basketball

The Ohio Athletic Conference men's basketball tournament is the annual conference basketball championship tournament for the NCAA Division III Ohio Athletic Conference. The tournament has been held annually since 1960, one of the oldest in Division III. It is a single-elimination tournament and seeding is based on regular conference season records.

The winner receives the OAC's automatic bid to the NCAA Division III men's basketball tournament.

== Results ==
Year	Champions	Score	Runner-up
1949	Akron	71–60	Kent State
1950– 1959	Not held		
1960	Wittenberg	65–56	Akron
1961	Wittenberg	55–47	Akron
1962	Wittenberg	56–49	Akron
1963	Wittenberg	64–46	Akron
1964	Akron	52–51	Wittenberg
1965	Akron	83–71	Otterbein
1966	Akron	102–82	Otterbein
1967	Baldwin-Wallace	74–72 (OT)	Otterbein
1968	Denison	73–72	Baldwin-Wallace
1969	Wittenberg	68–66	Baldwin-Wallace
1970	Oberlin	65–58	Wittenberg
1971	Capital	123–94	Mount Union
1972	Wittenberg	76–66	Kenyon
1973	Wooster	49–48	Wittenberg
1974	Wittenberg	62–48	Ohio Northern
1975	Wittenberg	67–65	Oberlin
1976	Oberlin	64–56 (OT)	Wittenberg
1977	Muskingum	79–63	Wooster
1978	Otterbein	72–71	Wooster
1979	Wittenberg	52–50	Wooster
1980	Ohio Northern	83–71	Wittenberg
1981	Wittenberg	85–64	Baldwin-Wallace
1982	Wittenberg	77–68	Heidelberg
1983	Wittenberg	61–47	Capital
1984	Capital	69–59	Heidelberg
1985	Wittenberg	68–64	Otterbein
1986	Otterbein	100–86	Marietta
1987	Wittenberg	68–61	Otterbein
1988	Muskingum	46–45	Ohio Northern
1989	Otterbein	76–62	Wittenberg
1990	Muskingum	86–58	Otterbein
1991	Otterbein	70–68	Muskingum
1992	Otterbein	88–76	Baldwin-Wallace
1993	Otterbein	101–82	Heidelberg
1994	Otterbein	79–73	Heidelberg
1995	Ohio Northern	84–65	Heidelberg
1996	Baldwin-Wallace	60–59	Marietta
1997	Mount Union	71–56	Ohio Northern
1998	Baldwin-Wallace	83–80	Otterbein
1999	Ohio Northern	67–53	Otterbein
2000	Ohio Northern	78–69	Otterbein
2001	Ohio Northern	73–64	Muskingum
2002	Otterbein	69–67	Capital
2003	John Carroll	94–86	Capital
2004	John Carroll	76–74	Mount Union
2005	Baldwin-Wallace	82–77	John Carroll
2006	Baldwin-Wallace	91–85 (OT)	Ohio Northern
2007	Capital	78–73	John Carroll
2008	Heidelberg	83–75	Capital
2009	John Carroll	90–87	Capital
2010	Wilmington (OH)	82–69	Heidelberg
2011	Marietta	88–85	John Carroll
2012	Capital	70–60	Wilmington (OH)
2013	Marietta	80–76 (OT)	Mount Union
2014	Wilmington (OH)	69–63	John Carroll
2015	Mount Union	85–81	Marietta
2016	John Carroll	87–85	Marietta
2017	Marietta	83–74	Baldwin-Wallace
2018	John Carroll	94–77	Ohio Northern
2019	Baldwin-Wallace	79–75	Mount Union
2020	Mount Union	85-74	John Carroll
2021	Marietta	100–49	Ohio Northern
2022	Marietta	63–61	Mount Union
2023	Mount Union	95–80	Marietta
2024	John Carroll	88–86	Mount Union
2025	John Carroll	82–69	Mount Union
2026	Heidelberg	82–75	Otterbein

== Championship records ==
School	Finals Record	Finals Appearances	Years
Wittenberg	14–6	20	1960, 1961, 1962, 1963, 1969, 1972, 1974, 1975, 1979, 1981, 1982, 1983, 1985, 1987
Otterbein	8–10	18	1978, 1986, 1989, 1991, 1992, 1993, 1994, 2002
John Carroll	7–4	11	2003, 2004, 2009, 2016, 2018, 2024, 2025
Baldwin Wallace	6–5	11	1967, 1996, 1998, 2005, 2006, 2019
Ohio Northern	5–6	11	1980, 1995, 1999, 2000, 2001
Marietta	5–5	10	2011, 2013, 2017, 2021, 2022
Mount Union	4–7	11	1997, 2015, 2020, 2023
Capital	4–5	9	1971, 1984, 2007, 2012
Akron	4–4	8	1949, 1964, 1965, 1966
Muskingum	3–2	5	1977, 1988, 1990
Heidelberg	2–6	8	2008, 2026
Wilmington (OH)	2–1	3	2010, 2014
Oberlin	2–1	3	1970, 1976
Wooster	1–3	4	1973
Denison	1–0	1	1968
Kent State	0–1	1	
Kenyon	0–1	1	

- Hiram and Ohio Wesleyan never qualified for the tournament finals as members of the OAC

== See also ==
- NCAA Division III men's basketball tournament
