= Wisconsin–Platteville Pioneers =

NCAA Division III team

- University: University of Wisconsin–Platteville
- Nickname: Pioneers
- NCAA: Division III
- Conference: WIAC
- Location: Platteville, Wisconsin
- Football stadium: Ralph E. Davis Pioneer Stadium
- Basketball arena: Williams Fieldhouse
- Colors: Orange and blue
- Website: www.letsgopioneers.com
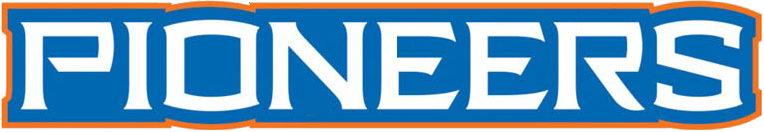

Team NCAA championships
- 4

The University of Wisconsin–Platteville Pioneers (casually known as the UW-Platteville Pioneers) are the athletic teams of the University of Wisconsin–Platteville. The Pioneers athletic teams compete in NCAA Division III.

== Varsity sports ==
Men's sports	Women's sports
Baseball	Basketball
Basketball	Cross country
Cross country	Golf
Football	Soccer
Soccer	Softball
Track and field	Track and field
Wrestling	Volleyball

== National championships ==
=== Team ===
Sport	Titles	Assoc.	Division	Year	Opponent	Score
Men's basketball	4	NCAA	Division III	1991	Franklin & Marshall	81–74
Men's basketball	4	NCAA	Division III	1995	Manchester (IN)	69–55
Men's basketball	4	NCAA	Division III	1998	Hope	69–56
Men's basketball	4	NCAA	Division III	1999	Hampden–Sydney	76–75 (2OT)

== Notable athletes ==
- Dan Arnold
- Geep Chryst
- Tom Davis
- Greg Gard
- Mike Hintz
- Matt Janus
- Rob Jeter
- Phil Micech
- Saul Phillips
- Chester J. Roberts
- Bo Ryan
