= List of William & Mary Tribe football seasons =

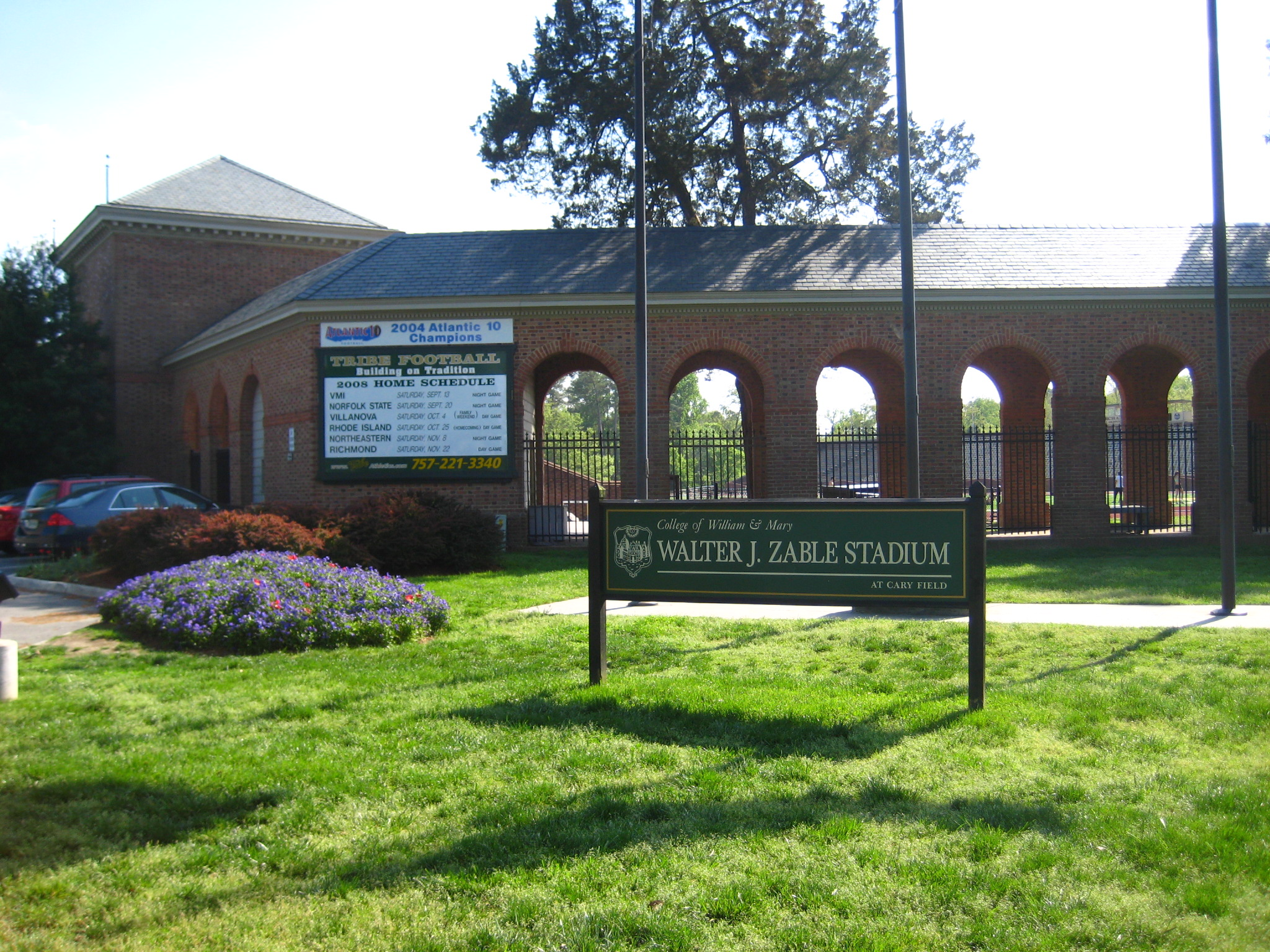
Walter J. Zable Stadium at Cary Field has been the home field for the Tribe since 1935.

The William & Mary Tribe college football team competes in the NCAA Division I Football Championship Subdivision (formerly known as Division I-AA), representing the College of William & Mary in the Patriot League. William & Mary has played its home games at Zable Stadium in Williamsburg, Virginia since 1935.

William & Mary fielded its first intercollegiate football team during the 1893 season. Between 1896 and 1908 the team's nickname was "Orange and White", derived from the school's former colors (William & Mary now uses green and gold). Since white uniforms dirtied too quickly, they became known as the "Orange and Black" from 1910 through 1916. Between 1917 and 1977 they were known as the Indians, and throughout this period a man dressing up as a Native American would ride around on a pony along the sidelines during games. This practice was discontinued when the outcry of stereotyping Native Americans as well as the use of a live animal became controversial. Since the 1978 season William & Mary has adopted the nickname "Tribe."

Throughout its history, William & Mary has been a member of seven different athletic conferences. Three of these—the South Atlantic Intercollegiate Athletic Association, Virginia Conference and Yankee Conference—are now defunct. The Tribe's membership as a Southern Conference school is its longest tenure with one conference; they had a 40-year membership between 1936 and 1976. William & Mary's current league, the Coastal Athletic Association Football Conference (CAA), has only been a football conference since 2007 (it was known as the Colonial Athletic Association from 2007 through 2022, then rebranded in July 2023). The CAA began competing in football as a result of the Atlantic 10 Conference's disbanding of the sport following the 2006 season. The A-10's remaining football schools joined the CAA football conference to continue competing in the sport. For all intents and purposes, including the conference's automatic bid to the FCS playoffs, the A-10 football conference became the present-day CAA football conference.

Through the 2025 season, William & Mary has earned 13 I-AA/FCS playoff berths. In two of these years (1988 and 1992) the Tribe has declined the bid, opting instead to play in the Epson Ivy Bowl, which was a short-lived college football bowl game played in Japan against a team composed of Japanese all-stars. The Epson Ivy Bowl is not recognized by the NCAA as an official game and therefore does not count towards official win–loss records. In the playoffs, William & Mary has reached the national semifinals two times (2004 and 2009), and in each of those seasons won a program record 11 wins. Previously in the Tribe's history they have also earned three postseason bowl game appearances, compiling one win and two losses. There have also been 18 conference championships and one division championship; five of the conference titles and the lone division title were won under head coach Jimmye Laycock, who was the head coach from 1980 through 2018.

== Seasons ==
Legend

^{†} Conference champions
^{‡} Division champions
^ Bowl game berth
* Playoff berth

List of William & Mary Tribe football seasons
| Season | Team | Head coach | Conference | Division | Regular season results | | | | | | | Postseason results | Final ranking | |
| Season | Team | Head coach | Conference | Division | Conference | | | | Overall | | | Bowl game/Playoff result | NCAA / TSN Poll^{[a]} | AP / Coaches' Poll^{[b]} |
| Season | Team | Head coach | Conference | Division | Finish | Win | Loss | Tie | Win | Loss | Tie | Bowl game/Playoff result | NCAA / TSN Poll^{[a]} | AP / Coaches' Poll^{[b]} |
|---|---|---|---|---|---|---|---|---|---|---|---|---|---|---|
William & Mary Tribe
| 1893 | 1893 | No coach | Independent | — | — | | | | 2 | 1 | 0 | — | — | — |
| 1894 | 1894 | John W. Wright | Independent | — | — | | | | 0 | 1 | 0 | — | — | — |
| 1895 | No team | | | | | | | | | | | | | |
| 1896 | 1896 | Bill Armstrong | Independent | — | — | | | | 0 | 2 | 0 | — | — | — |
| 1897 | 1897 | W. J. King | Independent | — | — | | | | 0 | 1 | 0 | — | — | — |
| 1898 | 1898 | W. J. King | Independent | — | — | | | | 1 | 1 | 0 | — | — | — |
| 1899 | 1899 | William H. Burke | Independent | — | — | | | | 2 | 3 | 0 | — | — | — |
| 1900 | 1900 | W. J. King | Independent | — | — | | | | 1 | 2 | 0 | — | — | — |
| 1901 | 1901 | No coach | Independent | — | — | | | | 2 | 1 | 1 | — | — | — |
| 1902 | 1902 | No coach | Independent | — | — | | | | 1 | 1 | 1 | — | — | — |
| 1903 | 1903 | H. J. Davall | EVIAA | — | | 0 | 2 | 0 | 1 | 3 | 0 | — | — | — |
| 1904 | 1904 | J. Merrill Blanchard | EVIAA | — | | 1 | 1 | 0 | 3 | 3 | 0 | — | — | — |
| 1905 | 1905 | J. Merrill Blanchard | EVIAA | — | | 0 | 2 | 0 | 2 | 4 | 1 | — | — | — |
| 1906 | 1906 | H. W. Withers | EVIAA | — | | 0 | 2 | 0 | 2 | 6 | 0 | — | — | — |
| 1907 | 1907^{†} | James E. Barry | EVIAA | — | T–1st | 2 | 0 | 1 | 6 | 3 | 0 | — | — | — |
| 1908 | 1908 | George E. O'Hearn | EVIAA | — | T–3rd | 1 | 2 | 0 | 4 | 6 | 1 | — | — | — |
| 1909 | 1909^{†} | George E. O'Hearn | EVIAA | — | T–1st | 2 | 1 | 0 | 6 | 4 | 0 | — | — | — |
| 1910 | 1910 | J. Merrill Blanchard | EVIAA | — | 3rd | 1 | 2 | 0 | 1 | 7 | 1 | — | — | — |
| 1911 | 1911 | William J. Young | EVIAA | — | 3rd | 1 | 2 | 0 | 1 | 5 | 2 | — | — | — |
| 1912 | 1912 | William J. Young | EVIAA | — | 4th | 0 | 3 | 0 | 0 | 7 | 0 | — | — | — |
| 1913 | 1913 | Dexter W. Draper | EVIAA | — | 4th | 0 | 3 | 0 | 0 | 5 | 1 | — | — | — |
| 1914 | 1914 | Dexter W. Draper | EVIAA | — | 4th | 1 | 5 | 0 | 1 | 7 | 0 | — | — | — |
| 1915 | 1915 | Dexter W. Draper | EVIAA | — | 4th | 0 | 6 | 0 | 0 | 9 | 1 | — | — | — |
| 1916 | 1916 | Samuel H. Hubbard | EVIAA / SAIAA | — | T–3rd (EVIAA) / 12th (SAIAA) | 1–4–1 (EVIAA) / 0–2–1 (SAIAA) | | | 2–5–2 (EVIAA) / 2–5–2 (SAIAA) | | | — | — | — |
| 1917 | 1917 | Herbert J. Young | EVIAA / SAIAA | — | 3rd (EVIAA) / 11th (SAIAA) | 2–4–0 (EVIAA) / 0–3–0 (SAIAA) | | | 3–5–0 (EVIAA) / 3–5–0 (SAIAA) | | | — | — | — |
| 1918 | 1918 | Vernon Geddy | SAIAA | — | T–6th | 0 | 1 | 0 | 0 | 2 | 0 | — | — | — |
| 1919 | 1919 | James G. Driver | SAIAA | — | 10th | 1 | 3 | 0 | 2 | 6 | 1 | — | — | — |
| 1920 | 1920 | Dexter W. Draper | SAIAA | — | 14th | 0 | 4 | 0 | 4 | 5 | 0 | — | — | — |
| 1921 | 1921 | Bill Fincher | SAIAA | — | 10th | 1 | 3 | 1 | 4 | 3 | 1 | — | — | — |
| 1922 | 1922 | Bill Ingram | Independent | — | — | | | | 6 | 3 | 0 | — | — | — |
| 1923 | 1923 | J. Wilder Tasker | Independent | — | — | | | | 6 | 3 | 0 | — | — | — |
| 1924 | 1924 | J. Wilder Tasker | Independent | — | — | | | | 5 | 2 | 1 | — | — | — |
| 1925 | 1925 | J. Wilder Tasker | Independent | — | — | | | | 6 | 4 | 0 | — | — | — |
| 1926 | 1926 | J. Wilder Tasker | Independent | — | — | | | | 7 | 3 | 0 | — | — | — |
| 1927 | 1927 | J. Wilder Tasker | Virginia | — | 1st | 2 | 0 | 1 | 4 | 5 | 1 | — | — | — |
| 1928 | 1928 | Branch Bocock | Virginia | — | 2nd | 5 | 1 | 0 | 6 | 3 | 2 | — | — | — |
| 1929 | 1929 | Branch Bocock | Virginia | — | 1st | 5 | 0 | 0 | 8 | 2 | 0 | — | — | — |
| 1930 | 1930 | Branch Bocock | Virginia | — | 1st | 5 | 0 | 0 | 7 | 2 | 1 | — | — | — |
| 1931 | 1931 | John Kellison | Virginia | — | 2nd | 4 | 1 | 0 | 5 | 2 | 2 | — | — | — |
| 1932 | 1932 | John Kellison | Virginia | — | 2nd | 4 | 1 | 0 | 8 | 4 | 0 | — | — | — |
| 1933 | 1933^{†} | John Kellison | Virginia | — | T–1st | 2 | 1 | 0 | 6 | 5 | 0 | — | — | — |
| 1934 | 1934^{†} | John Kellison | Virginia | — | T–1st | 2 | 1 | 0 | 2 | 6 | 0 | — | — | — |
| 1935 | 1935 | Thomas Dowler | Virginia | — | 1st | 1 | 1 | 1 | 3 | 4 | 2 | — | — | — |
| 1936 | 1936 | Branch Bocock | Southern | — | 15th | 0 | 5 | 0 | 1 | 8 | 0 | — | — | — |
| 1937 | 1937 | Branch Bocock | Southern | — | 13th | 1 | 3 | 0 | 4 | 5 | 0 | — | — | — |
| 1938 | 1938 | Branch Bocock | Southern | — | 15th | 0 | 4 | 0 | 3 | 7 | 0 | — | — | — |
| 1939 | 1939 | Carl M. Voyles | Southern | — | 8th | 1 | 1 | 1 | 6 | 2 | 1 | — | — | — |
| 1940 | 1940 | Carl M. Voyles | Southern | — | 4th | 2 | 1 | 1 | 6 | 2 | 1 | — | — | — |
| 1941 | 1941 | Carl M. Voyles | Southern | — | 4th | 4 | 1 | 0 | 8 | 2 | 0 | — | — | — |
| 1942 | 1942^{†} | Carl M. Voyles | Southern | — | 1st | 4 | 0 | 0 | 9 | 1 | 1 | — | — | 14 / — |
| 1943 | No team fielded due to World War II | | | | | | | | | | | | | |
| 1944 | 1944 | Rube McCray | Southern | — | 5th | 2 | 1 | 1 | 5 | 2 | 1 | — | — | — |
| 1945 | 1945 | Rube McCray | Southern | — | 3rd | 4 | 2 | 0 | 6 | 3 | 0 | — | — | — |
| 1946 | 1946 | Rube McCray | Southern | — | 2nd | 7 | 1 | 0 | 8 | 2 | 0 | — | — | — |
| 1947 | 1947^{†} | Rube McCray | Southern | — | 1st | 7 | 1 | 0 | 9 | 2 | 0 | Lost Dixie Bowl^ | — | 14 / — |
| 1948 | 1948 | Rube McCray | Southern | — | 4th | 5 | 1 | 1 | 7 | 2 | 2 | Won Delta Bowl^ | — | 17 / — |
| 1949 | 1949 | Rube McCray | Southern | — | 5th | 4 | 2 | 0 | 6 | 4 | 0 | — | — | — |
| 1950 | 1950 | Rube McCray | Southern | — | 10th | 3 | 3 | 0 | 4 | 7 | 0 | — | — | — |
| 1951 | 1951 | Marvin Bass | Southern | — | T–3rd | 5 | 1 | 0 | 7 | 3 | 0 | — | — | — |
| 1952 | 1952 | Marvin Bass | Southern | — | 4th | 4 | 1 | 0 | 4 | 5 | 0 | — | — | — |
| 1953 | 1953 | Jack Freeman | Southern | — | 4th | 3 | 2 | 0 | 5 | 4 | 1 | — | — | — |
| 1954 | 1954 | Jack Freeman | Southern | — | 7th | 1 | 2 | 2 | 4 | 2 | 2 | — | — | — |
| 1955 | 1955 | Jack Freeman | Southern | — | 8th | 1 | 3 | 1 | 1 | 7 | 1 | — | — | — |
| 1956 | 1956 | Jack Freeman | Southern | — | 10th | 0 | 5 | 0 | 0 | 9 | 1 | — | — | — |
| 1957 | 1957 | Jack Freeman | Southern | — | T–5th | 2 | 4 | 0 | 4 | 6 | 0 | — | — | — |
| 1958 | 1958 | Milt Drewer | Southern | — | 9th | 1 | 4 | 1 | 2 | 6 | 1 | — | — | — |
| 1959 | 1959 | Milt Drewer | Southern | — | 7th | 4 | 3 | 0 | 4 | 6 | 0 | — | — | — |
| 1960 | 1960 | Milt Drewer | Southern | — | 8th | 1 | 6 | 0 | 2 | 8 | 0 | — | — | — |
| 1961 | 1961 | Milt Drewer | Southern | — | 9th | 1 | 6 | 0 | 1 | 9 | 0 | — | — | — |
| 1962 | 1962 | Milt Drewer | Southern | — | 4th | 4 | 3 | 1 | 4 | 5 | 1 | — | — | — |
| 1963 | 1963 | Milt Drewer | Southern | — | 5th | 4 | 5 | 0 | 4 | 6 | 0 | — | — | — |
| 1964 | 1964 | Marv Levy | Southern | — | T–4th | 4 | 3 | 0 | 4 | 6 | 0 | — | — | — |
| 1965 | 1965 | Marv Levy | Southern | — | 2nd | 5 | 1 | 0 | 6 | 4 | 0 | — | — | — |
| 1966 | 1966^{†} | Marv Levy | Southern | — | T–1st | 4 | 1 | 1 | 5 | 4 | 1 | — | — | — |
| 1967 | 1967 | Marv Levy | Southern | — | 4th | 2 | 2 | 1 | 5 | 4 | 1 | — | — | — |
| 1968 | 1968 | Marv Levy | Southern | — | T–3rd | 2 | 2 | 0 | 3 | 7 | 0 | — | — | — |
| 1969 | 1969 | Marv Levy | Southern | — | 4th | 2 | 2 | 0 | 3 | 7 | 0 | — | — | — |
| 1970 | 1970^{†} | Lou Holtz | Southern | — | 1st | 3 | 1 | 0 | 5 | 7 | 0 | Lost Tangerine Bowl^ | — | — |
| 1971 | 1971 | Lou Holtz | Southern | — | 2nd | 3 | 1 | 0 | 5 | 6 | 0 | — | — | — |
| 1972 | 1972 | Jim Root | Southern | — | 3rd | 4 | 2 | 0 | 5 | 6 | 0 | — | — | — |
| 1973 | 1973 | Jim Root | Southern | — | 3rd | 3 | 2 | 0 | 6 | 5 | 0 | — | — | — |
| 1974 | 1974 | Jim Root | Southern | — | 6th | 2 | 3 | 0 | 4 | 7 | 0 | — | — | — |
| 1975 | 1975 | Jim Root | Southern | — | 5th | 2 | 3 | 0 | 2 | 9 | 0 | — | — | — |
| 1976 | 1976 | Jim Root | Southern | — | 2nd | 3 | 1 | 0 | 7 | 4 | 0 | — | — | — |
| 1977 | 1977 | Jim Root | Independent | — | — | | | | 6 | 5 | 0 | — | — | — |
| 1978 | 1978 | Jim Root | Independent | — | — | | | | 5 | 5 | 1 | — | — | — |
| 1979 | 1979 | Jim Root | Independent | — | — | | | | 4 | 7 | 0 | — | — | — |
| 1980 | 1980 | Jimmye Laycock | Independent | — | — | | | | 2 | 9 | 0 | — | — | — |
| 1981 | 1981 | Jimmye Laycock | Independent | — | — | | | | 5 | 6 | 0 | — | — | — |
| 1982 | 1982 | Jimmye Laycock | Independent | — | — | | | | 3 | 8 | 0 | — | — | — |
| 1983 | 1983 | Jimmye Laycock | Independent | — | — | | | | 6 | 5 | 0 | — | — | — |
| 1984 | 1984 | Jimmye Laycock | Independent | — | — | | | | 6 | 5 | 0 | — | — | — |
| 1985 | 1985 | Jimmye Laycock | Independent | — | — | | | | 7 | 4 | 0 | — | 16 / — | — |
| 1986 | 1986 | Jimmye Laycock | Independent | — | — | | | | 9 | 3 | 0 | NCAA Division I-AA Playoffs – first round* | 8 / — | — |
| 1987 | 1987 | Jimmye Laycock | Independent | — | — | | | | 5 | 7 | 0 | — | — | — |
| 1988 | 1988 | Jimmye Laycock | Independent | — | — | | | | 6 | 4 | 1 | Declined bid to NCAA Division I-AA Playoffs; Won Epson Ivy Bowl^ | — | — |
| 1989 | 1989 | Jimmye Laycock | Independent | — | — | | | | 8 | 3 | 1 | NCAA Division I-AA Playoffs – first round* | 10 / — | — |
| 1990 | 1990 | Jimmye Laycock | Independent | — | — | | | | 10 | 3 | 0 | NCAA Division I-AA Playoffs – Quarterfinals* | 7 / — | — |
| 1991 | 1991 | Jimmye Laycock | Independent | — | — | | | | 5 | 6 | 0 | — | — | — |
| 1992 | 1992 | Jimmye Laycock | Independent | — | — | | | | 9 | 2 | 0 | Declined bid to NCAA Division I-AA Playoffs; Won Epson Ivy Bowl^ | 13 / — | — |
| 1993 | 1993^{‡} | Jimmye Laycock | Yankee | Mid-Atlantic | 2nd | 7 | 1 | 0 | 9 | 3 | 0 | NCAA Division I-AA Playoffs – first round* | — / 10 | — |
| 1994 | 1994 | Jimmye Laycock | Yankee | Mid-Atlantic | T–2nd | 6 | 2 | 0 | 8 | 3 | 0 | — | — / 19 | — |
| 1995 | 1995 | Jimmye Laycock | Yankee | Mid-Atlantic | T–4th | 5 | 3 | 0 | 7 | 4 | 0 | — | — / 19 | — |
| 1996 | 1996^{†} | Jimmye Laycock | Yankee | Mid-Atlantic | 1st | 7 | 1 | - | 10 | 3 | -^{[c]} | NCAA Division I-AA Playoffs – Quarterfinals* | — / 7 | — |
| 1997 | 1997 | Jimmye Laycock | Atlantic 10 | Mid-Atlantic | T–5th | 4 | 4 | - | 7 | 4 | - | — | — | — |
| 1998 | 1998 | Jimmye Laycock | Atlantic 10 | Mid-Atlantic | T–4th | 4 | 4 | - | 7 | 4 | - | — | — / 16 | — |
| 1999 | 1999 | Jimmye Laycock | Atlantic 10 | — | T–4th | 5 | 3 | - | 6 | 5 | - | — | — | — |
| 2000 | 2000 | Jimmye Laycock | Atlantic 10 | — | T–4th | 4 | 4 | - | 5 | 6 | - | — | — | — |
| 2001 | 2001^{†} | Jimmye Laycock | Atlantic 10 | — | T–1st | 7 | 2 | - | 8 | 4 | - | NCAA Division I-AA Playoffs – first round* | — / 17 | — |
| 2002 | 2002 | Jimmye Laycock | Atlantic 10 | — | 5th | 5 | 4 | - | 6 | 5 | - | — | — | — |
| 2003 | 2003 | Jimmye Laycock | Atlantic 10 | — | 6th | 4 | 4 | - | 5 | 5 | - | — | — | — |
| 2004 | 2004^{†} | Jimmye Laycock | Atlantic 10 | — | T–1st | 7 | 1 | - | 11 | 3 | - | NCAA Division I-AA Playoffs – Semifinals* | — / 3 | — |
| 2005 | 2005 | Jimmye Laycock | Atlantic 10 | — | T–6th | 3 | 5 | - | 5 | 6 | - | — | — | — |
| 2006 | 2006 | Jimmye Laycock | Atlantic 10 | — | T–6th | 1 | 7 | - | 3 | 8 | - | — | — | — |
| 2007 | 2007 | Jimmye Laycock | CAA^{[d]} | South | T–5th | 2 | 6 | - | 4 | 7 | - | — | — | — |
| 2008 | 2008 | Jimmye Laycock | CAA^{[d]} | South | T–3rd | 5 | 3 | - | 7 | 4 | - | — | — / 20 | — |
| 2009 | 2009 | Jimmye Laycock | CAA^{[d]} | South | T–3rd | 6 | 2 | - | 11 | 3 | - | NCAA Division I FCS playoffs – Semifinals* | — / 6 | — / T–3 |
| 2010 | 2010^{†} | Jimmye Laycock | CAA^{[d]} | — | T–1st | 6 | 2 | - | 8 | 4 | - | NCAA Division I FCS playoffs – second round* | — / 10 | — / 8 |
| 2011 | 2011 | Jimmye Laycock | CAA^{[d]} | — | 7th | 3 | 5 | - | 5 | 6 | - | — | — | — |
| 2012 | 2012 | Jimmye Laycock | CAA^{[d]} | — | 9th | 1 | 7 | - | 2 | 9 | - | — | — | — |
| 2013 | 2013 | Jimmye Laycock | CAA^{[d]} | — | T–5th | 4 | 4 | - | 7 | 5 | - | — | — | — |
| 2014 | 2014 | Jimmye Laycock | CAA^{[d]} | — | 5th | 4 | 4 | - | 7 | 5 | - | — | — | — |
| 2015 | 2015^{†} | Jimmye Laycock | CAA^{[d]} | — | T–1st | 6 | 2 | - | 9 | 4 | - | NCAA Division I FCS playoffs – second round* | — / 12 | — / 12 |
| 2016 | 2016 | Jimmye Laycock | CAA^{[d]} | — | T–8th | 3 | 5 | - | 5 | 6 | - | — | — | — |
| 2017 | 2017 | Jimmye Laycock | CAA^{[d]} | — | 12th | 0 | 8 | - | 2 | 9 | - | — | — | — |
| 2018 | 2018 | Jimmye Laycock | CAA^{[d]} | — | 8th | 3 | 4 | - | 4 | 6 | - | — | — | — |
| 2019 | 2019 | Mike London | CAA^{[d]} | — | 10th | 3 | 5 | - | 5 | 7 | - | — | — | — |
| 2020^{[e]} | 2020^{[e]} | Mike London | CAA^{[d]} | South | 3rd | 1 | 2 | - | 1 | 2 | - | — | — | — |
| 2021 | 2021 | Mike London | CAA^{[d]} | — | T–5th | 4 | 4 | - | 6 | 5 | - | — | — | — |
| 2022 | 2022^{†} | Mike London | CAA^{[d]} | — | T–1st | 7 | 1 | - | 11 | 2 | - | NCAA Division I FCS playoffs – Quarterfinals* | — / 8 | — / 8 |
| 2023 | 2023 | Mike London | CAA^{[d]} | — | T–6th | 4 | 4 | - | 6 | 5 | - | — | — | — |
| 2024 | 2024 | Mike London | CAA^{[d]} | — | T–9th | 4 | 4 | - | 7 | 5 | - | — | — | — |
| 2025 | 2025 | Mike London | CAA^{[d]} | — | T–3rd | 6 | 2 | - | 7 | 5 | - | — | — | — |
| 2026 | 2026 | Mike London | Patriot | — | TBD | 0 | 0 | - | 0 | 0 | - | TBD | TBD | TBD |

== Notes ==
- ^{a} Since the 1978 split in divisions, the NCAA, or more recently, The Sports Network Poll has been the major poll at the FCS level.
- ^{b} The FCS Coaches' Poll was introduced in 2007. Therefore, polls for prior seasons do not exist.
- ^{c} Overtime rules in college football were implemented in 1996, making ties impossible moving forward.
- ^{d} The football league was known as the Colonial Athletic Association in 2007 and stayed with that name through the 2022 season. In July 2023, the CAA rebranded into the Coastal Athletic Association, with football being officially recognized as the Coastal Athletic Association Football Conference starting in 2023. The Colonial Athletic Association's football records recognized as part of the Coastal's history.
- ^{e} The Fall 2020 CAA season was delayed due to the COVID-19 pandemic, with league play resuming in a shortened Spring 2021 season.
