= List of William & Mary Tribe head football coaches =

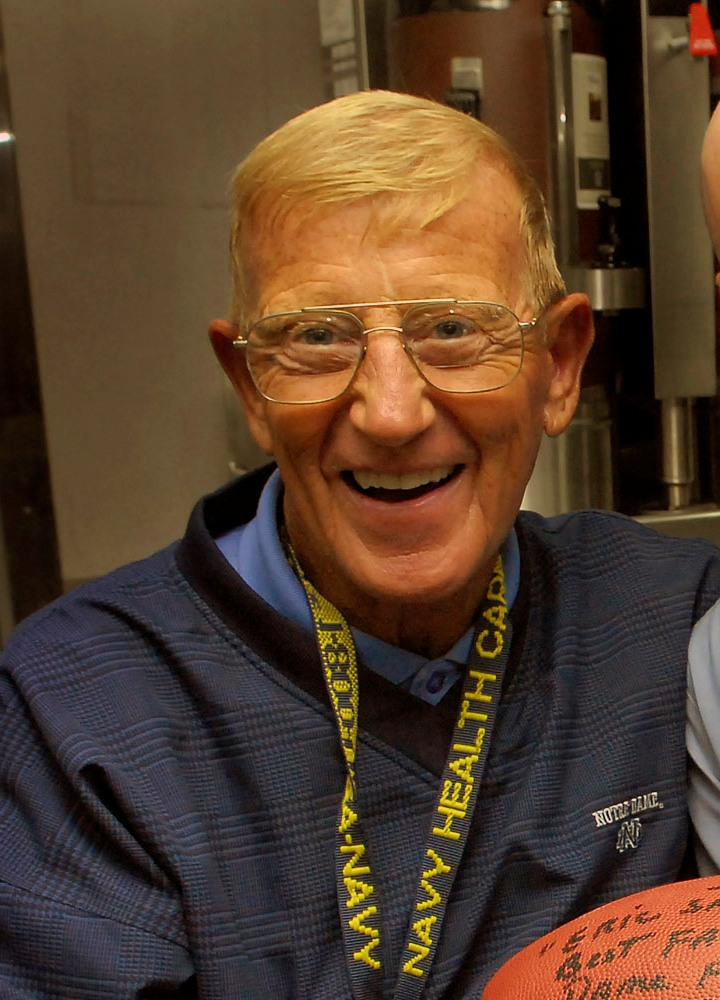
Lou Holtz (1969–1971) coached William & Mary to the 1970 Tangerine Bowl

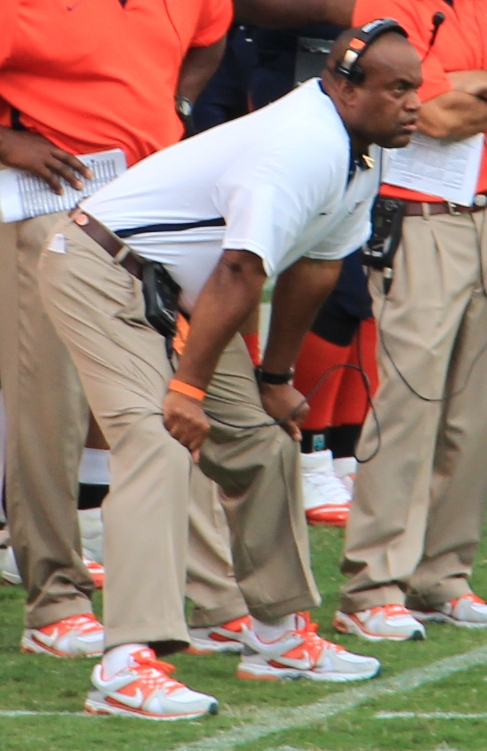
Mike London during his tenure as head coach for Virginia (2010–2015)

The William & Mary Tribe football program has represented the College of William & Mary in intercollegiate college football competition since 1893. The team has competed in the National Collegiate Athletic Association (NCAA) Division I since its formation in 1973. From 1956 to 1972 William & Mary competed in the NCAA University Division. William & Mary fielded its first intercollegiate football team during the 1893 season. Between 1896 and 1908 the team's nickname was "Orange and White," derived from the school's former colors (William & Mary now uses green and gold). Since white uniforms dirtied too quickly, they became known as the "Orange and Black" from 1910 through 1916. Between 1917 and 1977 they were known as the Indians, and throughout this period a man dressing up as a Native American would ride around on a pony along the sidelines during games. This practice was discontinued when the outcry of stereotyping Native Americans as well as the use of a live animal became controversial. Since the 1978 season, William & Mary has adopted the nickname "Tribe."

Through the 2025 season, there have been 31 different head coaches in school history. Among them, three have been inducted into the College Football Hall of Fame: Bill Fincher (1974), Bill Ingram (1973), and Lou Holtz (2008). Another coach—Marv Levy—was inducted into the Pro Football Hall of Fame in 2001. The all-time winningest coach in terms of total wins is Jimmye Laycock. Over a 39-year tenure (1980–2018) he amassed 249 wins, which is over five times more than the next closest head coach, Rube McCray, who had 45. The coach with the highest win percentage is Carl M. Voyles: he amassed a 78.2 winning percentage between 1939 and 1942, going 29–7–3 overall.

Despite having over 500 wins in its history, William & Mary football has never won a national championship. The Tribe have been to the FCS/I-AA playoffs 11 times through 2025 but have never reached the national championship game; twice they have reached the semi-finals. William & Mary has won bowl games, however. They defeated Oklahoma A&M in the 1949 Delta Bowl, 20–0, and also won two Epson Ivy Bowls in the 1990s. Seven different coaches have coached the Tribe to conference titles. Thomas Dowler, in his lone season at the helm, guided William & Mary to the Virginia Conference championship in 1935. Unsurprisingly, Jimmye Laycock has the most all-time titles with five, plus a divisional championship which was won in 1993.

== Key ==
Key to symbols in coaches list
General		Overall		Conference		Postseason (Note: Although the first Rose Bowl Game was played in 1902, it has been continuously played since the 1916 game, and is recognized as the oldest bowl game by the NCAA. "—" indicates any season prior to 1916 when postseason games were not played.)	
No.	Order of coaches (Note: A running total of the number of head coaches, with coaches who served separate tenures being counted only once. Interim head coaches are represented with "Int" and are not counted in the running total. "—" indicates the team played but either without a coach or no coach is on record. "X" indicates an interim year without play.)	GC	Games coached	CW	Conference wins	PW	Postseason wins
DC	Division championships	OW	Overall wins	CL	Conference losses	PL	Postseason losses
CC	Conference championships	OL	Overall losses	CT	Conference ties	PT	Postseason ties
NC	National championships	OT	Overall ties (Note: Overtime rules in college football were introduced in 1996, making ties impossible in the period since.)	C%	Conference winning percentage		
†	Elected to the College Football Hall of Fame	O%	Overall winning percentage (Note: When computing the win–loss percentage, a tie counts as half a win and half a loss.)				

== Coaches ==
List of head football coaches showing season(s) coached, overall records, conference records (Note: William & Mary has been a member of Coastal Athletic Association Football Conference since the 2006 season.), postseason records, championships and selected awards (Note: Statistics correct as of the end of the 2025 NCAA Division I FCS football season.)
No.	Name (Note: William & Mary did not have a head coach for the 1893 and 1901–1902 seasons.)	Season(s) (Note: William & Mary did not field teams for the 1895 and 1943 seasons.)	GC	OW	OL	OT	O%	CW	CL	CT	C%	PW	PL	PT	CCs	Awards
1	John W. Wright	1894	1	0	1	0	.000	—	—	—	—	—	—	—	—	—
2	Bill Armstrong	1896	2	0	2	0	.000	—	—	—	—	—	—	—	—	—
3	W. J. King	1897–1898; 1900	6	2	4	0	0.333	—	—	—	—	—	—	—	—	—
4	William H. Burke	1899	5	2	3	0	0.400	—	—	—	—	—	—	—	—	—
5	Harold J. Davall	1903	4	1	3	0	0.250	—	—	—	—	—	—	—	—	—
6	J. Merrill Blanchard	1904–1905; 1910	22	6	14	2	0.318	2	5	0	0.286	—	—	—	0	—
7	H. W. Withers	1906	8	2	6	0	0.250	0	2	0	.000	—	—	—	0	—
8	James E. Barry	1907	9	6	3	0	0.667	2	1	0	0.667	—	—	—	1	—
9	George E. O'Hearn	1908–1909	21	10	10	1	0.500	3	3	0	0.500	—	—	—	1	—
10	William J. Young	1911–1912	15	1	12	2	0.133	1	5	0	0.167	—	—	—	0	—
11	Dexter W. Draper	1913–1915	24	1	21	2	0.083	1	14	0	0.067	—	—	—	0	—
12	Samuel H. Hubbard	1916	9	2	5	2	0.333	1	5	1	0.214	—	—	—	0	—
13	Harry Young^{†}	1917	8	3	5	0	0.375	2	5	0	0.286	—	—	—	0	—
14	Vernon Geddy	1918	2	0	2	0	.000	—	—	—	—	—	—	—	—	—
15	James G. Driver	1919–1920	18	6	11	1	0.361	1	7	0	0.125	—	—	—	0	—
16	Bill Fincher^{†}	1921	8	4	3	1	0.563	1	3	1	0.300	—	—	—	0	—
17	Bill Ingram^{†}	1922	9	6	3	0	0.667	—	—	—	—	—	—	—	—	—
18	J. Wilder Tasker	1924–1927	49	30	17	2	0.633	2	0	1	0.833	—	—	—	1	—
19	Branch Bocock	1928–1930; 1936–1938	59	29	27	3	0.517	16	13	0	0.552	—	—	—	2	—
20	John Kellison	1931–1934	40	21	17	2	0.550	12	4	0	0.750	—	—	—	2	—
21	Thomas Dowler	1935	10	3	4	3	0.450	2	0	1	0.357	—	—	—	1	—
22	Carl M. Voyles	1939–1942	39	29	7	3	0.782	12	2	2	0.813	—	—	—	1	—
23	Rube McCray	1944–1950	70	45	22	3	0.664	32	11	2	0.943	1	1	0	1	—
24	Marvin Bass	1951	10	7	3	0	0.700	5	1	0	0.833	0	0	0	0	—
25	Jack Freeman	1952–1956	48	14	29	5	0.344	9	13	3	0.420	0	0	0	0	—
26	Milt Drewer	1957–1963	69	21	46	2	0.319	15	31	2	0.333	0	0	0	0	—
27	Marv Levy	1964–1968	50	23	25	2	0.480	17	10	2	0.621	0	0	0	1	—
28	Lou Holtz^{†}	1969–1971	33	13	20	0	0.394	9	4	0	0.692	0	1	0	1	—
29	Jim Root	1972–1979	88	39	48	1	0.449	14	11	0	0.560	0	0	0	0	—
30	Jimmye Laycock	1980–2018	445	249	194	2	0.562	112	98	0	0.533	7 (Note: The Epson Ivy Bowl is not recognized by the NCAA as an official game and therefore does not count towards official win–loss records. Thus, the two Epson Ivy Bowl wins would have increased Jimmye Laycock's postseason win count by two, but instead they are discounted.)	10	0	5	AFCA Region II Coach of the Year (1990)
31	Mike London	2019–present	74	43	31	—	0.581	29	22	—	0.569	1	1	—	1	—
