= 1911 William & Mary Orange and Black football team =

American college football season

1911 William & Mary Orange and Black football
- Conference: Eastern Virginia Intercollegiate Athletic Association
- Record: 1–5–2 (1–2 EVIAA)
- Head coach: William J. Young (1st season)
- Captain: W. B. Lee

1911 Eastern Virginia Intercollegiate Athletic Association football standings
	Conf.					Overall
Team	W		L		T	W		L		T
Randolph–Macon $	3	–	0	–	0	5	–	2	–	1
Hampden–Sydney	2	–	1	–	0	3	–	5	–	0
William & Mary	1	–	2	–	0	1	–	5	–	2
Richmond	0	–	3	–	0	0	–	6	–	2
$ – Conference champion

The 1911 William & Mary Orange and Black football team represented the College of William & Mary as a member of the Eastern Virginia Intercollegiate Athletic Association (EVIAA) during the 1911 college football season. Led by first-year head coach William J. Young, William & Mary compiled an overall record of 1–5–2 with a mark of 1–2 in conference placing third in the EVIAA.

== Schedule ==
Date	Time	Opponent	Site	Result	Source
September 30		at Virginia*	Madison Hall Field; Charlottesville, VA	L 0–81	
October 7	3:30 p.m.	at Georgetown*	Georgetown Field; Washington, DC	L 0–66	
October 14		University College of Medicine*	Williamsburg, VA	T 0–0	
October 21		Fredericksburg College*	Williamsburg, VA	T 0–0	
October 28		Virginia Medical*	Williamsburg, VA	L 0–6	
November 4		vs. Randolph–Macon	Newport News, VA	L 11–14	
November 11		Richmond	Williamsburg, VA (rivalry)	W 3–0	
November 18		at Hampden–Sydney	Hampden Sydney, VA	L 0–19	
*Non-conference game
