= 1904 William & Mary Orange and White football team =

American college football season

1904 William & Mary Orange and White football
- Conference: Eastern Virginia Intercollegiate Athletic Association
- Record: 3–3 (1–1 EVIAA)
- Head coach: J. Merrill Blanchard (1st season)
- Captain: C. E. Johnson

The 1904 William & Mary Orange and White football team was an American football team that represented the College of William & Mary as a member of the Eastern Virginia Intercollegiate Athletic Association (EVIAA) during the 1904 college football season. Led by first-year head coach J. Merrill Blanchard, the Orange and White compiled an overall record of 3–3, with 1–1 in conference.

== Schedule ==
Date	Opponent	Site	Result
October 1	Norfolk High School*	Williamsburg, VA	W 18–0
October 15	Portsmouth Athletic Club*	Williamsburg, VA	W 36–0
October 22	at VPI*	Gibboney Field; Blacksburg, VA	L 0–30
October 24	at Roanoke*	Roanoke, VA	L 5–6
November 4	Richmond	Williamsburg, VA (rivalry)	W 15–6
November 19	Randolph–Macon	Williamsburg, VA	L 0–6
*Non-conference game
