= Harry Wall (American football) =

American football coach and physician (1878–1942)

Biographical details
- Born: 1878
- Died: 1942 (aged 63–64)
- Education: West Virginia University

Playing career
- 1903: Virginia
- Position: Halfback

Coaching career (HC unless noted)
- 1904: Richmond
- 1909: Virginia (assistant)

Head coaching record
- Overall: 1–5

Harry Wall (1878–1942) was an American college football coach and physician. He was the 15th head football coach at Richmond College—now known as the University of Richmond—serving for one season, in 1904, and compiling a record of 1–5. A native of Winchester, Virginia, Wall graduated from the University of Virginia School of Medicine and played football at Virginia as a halfback, lettering in 1903.

Wall later practiced medicine in Norfolk, Virginia and was a member of the surgical staff at St. Vincent's Hospital there. In 1920, he was commissioned as a captain in the Medical Corps of the United States Army.

== Head coaching record ==
Year	Team	Overall	Conference	Standing	Bowl/playoffs
Richmond Spiders (Eastern Virginia Intercollegiate Athletic Association) (1904)
1904	Richmond	1–5	0–2		
Richmond:		1–5	0–2		
Total:		1–5			
