= 1903 William & Mary Orange and White football team =

American college football season

1903 William & Mary Orange and White football
- Conference: Eastern Virginia Intercollegiate Athletic Association
- Record: 1–3 (0–2 EVIAA)
- Head coach: Harold J. Davall (1st season)
- Captain: H. Blankenship

The 1903 William & Mary Orange and White football team was an American football team that represented the College of William & Mary as a member of the Eastern Virginia Intercollegiate Athletic Association (EVIAA) during the 1903 college football season. Led by Harold J. Davall in his first and only season as head coach, the Orange and White compiled an overall record of 1–3.

== Schedule ==
Date	Time	Opponent	Site	Result	Source
October 13		Norfolk High School*	Williamsburg, VA	W 15–0	
October 26		Old Point Comfort*	Williamsburg, VA	L 0–23	
October 31	3:30 p.m.	vs. Randolph–Macon	Broad Street Park; Richmond, VA	L 0–39	
November 14		at Richmond	Broad Street Park; Richmond, VA (rivalry)	L 0–24	
*Non-conference game
