= James E. Barry =

American baseball and football coach (1884–1941)

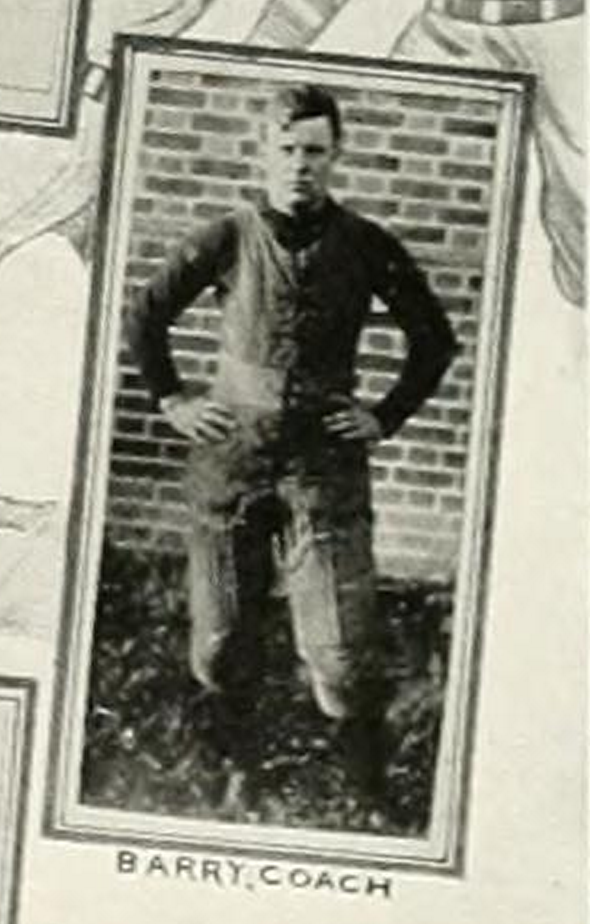
- Barry pictured in The Colonial Echo 1908, William & Mary yearbook

Biographical details
- Born: September 18, 1884; Norfolk, Virginia, U.S.
- Died: December 23, 1941 (aged 57); Norfolk, Virginia, U.S.

Playing career

Football
- 1905: Virginia

Football
- c. 1905: Virginia
- Positions: End (football); Left fielder (baseball)

Coaching career (HC unless noted)

Football
- 1906: William & Mary (assistant)
- 1907: William & Mary
- 1908: William & Mary (assistant)

Baseball
- 1907: William & Mary

Head coaching record
- Overall: 6–3 (football)

Accomplishments and honors

Championships
- Football; 1 EVIAA (1907)

James Edward Barry (September 18, 1884 – December 23, 1941) was an American college football and college baseball coach. He was the head coach of the College of William & Mary's baseball and football teams for their respective 1907 seasons.

A native of Norfolk, Virginia, Barry attended the University of Virginia, where he played football in 1905 as an end and baseball as a left fielder. He began coaching the football team at William & Mary in 1906 and assisted George E. O'Hearn with coaching the 1908 William & Mary Orange and White football team.

== Head coaching record ==
=== Football ===
Year	Team	Overall	Conference	Standing	Bowl/playoffs
William & Mary Orange and White (Eastern Virginia Intercollegiate Athletic Association) (1907)
1907	William & Mary	6–3	2–1	T–1st	
William & Mary:		6–3	2–1		
Total:		6–3			
National championship Conference title Conference division title or championship game berth
