= Sam Honaker =

Biographical details
- Born: March 14, 1887; Tampa, Florida, U.S.
- Died: March 21, 1966 (aged 79); Fort Lauderdale, Florida, U.S.
- Education: University of Virginia

Playing career
- 1906–1909: Virginia
- Position: Quarterback

Coaching career (HC unless noted)
- 1911: Richmond

Head coaching record
- Overall: 0–6–2

Accomplishments and honors

Awards
- All-Southern (1907)

Samuel William Honaker (March 14, 1887 – March 21, 1966) was an American college football player and coach and consul general.

== Early years ==
Honaker was born in Tampa, Florida in 1887 but grew up in Plano, Texas. He spent two years at Bingham Preparatory School in Asheville, North Carolina and five at the University of Virginia.

=== University of Virginia ===
Honaker was a quarterback for the Virginia Cavaliers of the University of Virginia, remembered as one of its "great" ones; "a diminutive quarterback who thrilled the crowds with his brilliant broken-field running."

"A well known New York authority on sports" selected Honaker for his All-Southern team in 1907. Walter Camp gave him honorable mention on his All-America teams.

The Cavaliers won a Southern title in 1908.

Virginia won a share of another title in 1909. Honaker was captain of the '09 team. Kemper Yancey was a teammate. Honaker graduated from UVA in 1913.

== Coaching career ==
Honaker was the head football coach at Richmond College—now known as the University of Richmond—for the 1911 season, compiling a record of 0–6–2.

== Consul general ==
Honaker later joined the United States Foreign Service, serving as consul general in Istanbul, Turkey at one point. He was also the consul general in Stuttgart, Germany in 1935.

== Head coaching record ==
Year	Team	Overall	Conference	Standing	Bowl/playoffs
Richmond Spiders (Eastern Virginia Intercollegiate Athletic Association) (1911)
1911	Richmond	0–6–2	0–3	4th	
Richmond:		0–6–2	0–3		
Total:		0–6–2			
