= 1904 Richmond Spiders football team =

American college football season

1904 Richmond Spiders football
- Conference: Eastern Virginia Intercollegiate Athletic Association
- Record: 1–5 (0–2 EVIAA)
- Head coach: Harry Wall (1st season)
- Captain: James B. Webster
- Home stadium: Broad Street Park

The 1904 Richmond Spiders football team was an American football team that represented Richmond College—now known as the University of Richmond—as a member of the Eastern Virginia Intercollegiate Athletic Association (EVIAA) during the 1904 college football season. Led by Harry Wall in his first and only year as head coach, Richmond compiled a record of 1–5.

== Schedule ==
Date	Time	Opponent	Site	Result	Source
October 1		at VPI*	Gibboney Field; Blacksburg, VA	L 0–18	
October 10		Norfork High School*	Broad Street Park; Richmond, VA	W 34–0	
October 15		at George Washington*	University Field; Washington, DC	L 0–17	
October 22		Old Point Artillery School*	Broad Street Park; Richmond, VA	L 0–32	
November 4		at William & Mary	Williamsburg, VA (rivalry)	L 6–15	
November 12	3:30 p.m.	Randolph–Macon	Broad Street Park; Richmond, VA	L 5–16	
*Non-conference game
