= 1949 Delta Bowl =

| Oklahoma A&M Cowboys | William & Mary Indians |
| (6–3) | (6–2–2) |
| 0 | 20 |
| Head coach: Jim Lookabaugh | Head coach: Rube McCray |
| | AP 17 |
| | 1 | 2 | 3 | 4 | Total |
|---|---|---|---|---|---|
| Oklahoma A&M | 0 | 0 | 0 | 0 | 0 |
| William & Mary | 0 | 0 | 6 | 14 | 20 |
- Date: January 1, 1949
- Season: 1948
- Stadium: Crump Stadium
- Location: Memphis, Tennessee
- Referee: K.C. Gerard
- Attendance: 15,069

The 1949 Delta Bowl was a college football postseason bowl game between the Oklahoma A&M Cowboys and the William & Mary Tribe. This was the second and final Delta Bowl.

== Background ==
This was William & Mary's second straight bowl game, after finishing 4th in the Southern Conference. They were selected after the Delta Bowl's first choice (selected prior to the season), Tulsa, finished 0-9-1. Oklahoma A&M was champion of the Missouri Valley Conference for the third time in five seasons.

== Game summary ==
A fumble recovery set up Korschcowski's second touchdown pass in the fourth quarter. Jack Cloud ran for 78 yards on 14 carries for the Indians. while Kenny Roof had 63 in seven carries for the Cowboys.

=== Scoring summary ===
- William & Mary - Lou Hoitsma 12-yard touchdown pass from Tommy Korschcowski
- William & Mary - Jack Bruce 22-yard touchdown pass from Tommy Korschcowski
- William & Mary - Lou Creekmur 70-yard interception return

== Aftermath ==
Lookabaugh left the program the following year, while McCray stayed on until 1950. The Indians did not return to a bowl game until 1970. This remains their only bowl win. Oklahoma A&M did not reach a bowl game again until 1958, their first year known as Oklahoma State. The Delta Bowl disbanded, likely due to the attendance of this game being 13,000 less than the first game.
