= 1911 Richmond Spiders football team =

American college football season

1911 Richmond Spiders football
- Conference: Eastern Virginia Intercollegiate Athletic Association
- Record: 0–6–2 (0–3 EVIAA)
- Head coach: Sam Honaker (1st season)
- Captain: Henry M. Taylor
- Home stadium: Broad Street Park

1911 Eastern Virginia Intercollegiate Athletic Association football standings
	Conf.					Overall
Team	W		L		T	W		L		T
Randolph–Macon $	3	–	0	–	0	5	–	2	–	1
Hampden–Sydney	2	–	1	–	0	3	–	5	–	0
William & Mary	1	–	2	–	0	1	–	5	–	2
Richmond	0	–	3	–	0	0	–	6	–	2
$ – Conference champion

The 1911 Richmond Spiders football team was an American football team that represented Richmond College—now known as the University of Richmond—as a member of the Eastern Virginia Intercollegiate Athletic Association (EVIAA) during the 1911 college football season. Led by Sam Honaker in his first and only year as head coach, compiled an overall record of 0–6–2 with a mark of 0–3 in conference play, placing last out of four teams in the EVIAA.

== Schedule ==
Date	Time	Opponent	Site	Result	Source
September 30	4:00 p.m.	Maryland*	Broad Street Park; Richmond, VA	T 0–0	
October 7		Fredericksburg College*	Broad Street Park; Richmond, VA	T 0–0	
October 14		Randolph–Macon*	Broad Street Park; Richmond, VA	L 0–13	
October 21		Georgetown*	Broad Street Park; Richmond, VA	L 0–65	
October 28		Hampden–Sydney	Broad Street Park; Richmond, VA	L 0–3	
November 4		at VMI*	Lexington, VA (rivalry)	L 0–38	
November 11		at William & Mary	Williamsburg, VA (rivalry)	L 0–3	
November 25		Randolph–Macon	Broad Street Park; Richmond, VA	L 0–9	
*Non-conference game
