= E. A. Dunlap =

American sports coach (1879–1964)

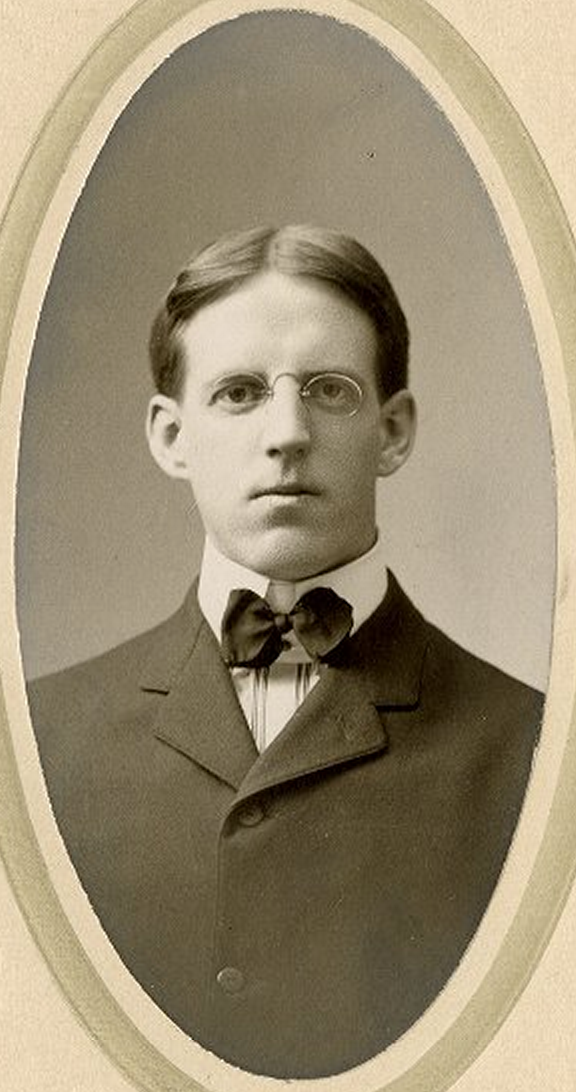
- Dunlap, c. 1903

Biographical details
- Born: September 25, 1879; Brunswick, Maine, U.S.
- Died: June 10, 1964 (aged 84); Haverhill, Massachusetts, U.S.
- Education: Bowdoin College (1903)

Playing career

Football
- 1899–1901: Bowdoin
- Positions: Fullback, tackle

Coaching career (HC unless noted)

Football
- 1905–1909: Richmond
- 1912: Richmond

Men's track and field
- 1910: Richmond
- 1913: Richmond

Head coaching record
- Overall: 19–33–5 (football)

Accomplishments and honors

Championships
- Football; 2 EVIAA (1906–1907)

Edward Augustus Dunlap Jr. (September 25, 1879 – June 10, 1964) was an American football, baseball, and track and field coach. He served as the head football coach at Richmond College—now known as the University of Richmond—from 1905 until 1909 and again in 1912, compiling a record of 19–33–5. While at Richmond, he was also the baseball coach as well as the school's athletic director.

Dunlap was born in Brunswick, Maine and graduated from Bowdoin College in 1903. After leaving Richmond, he was an inspector for the United Shoe Machinery Corporation. Dunlap resided in Beverly, Georgetown, and Haverhill, Massachusetts. He died on June 10, 1964, at his home in Haverhill.

== Head coaching record ==
=== Football ===
Year	Team	Overall	Conference	Standing	Bowl/playoffs
Richmond Spiders (Eastern Virginia Intercollegiate Athletic Association) (1905–1909)
1905	Richmond	3–5–2	1–4–2		
1906	Richmond	6–5–1	5–1	1st	
1907	Richmond	3–6	2–1	T–1st	
1908	Richmond	3–5	1–2	T–3rd	
1909	Richmond	3–5–2	1–2	T–3rd	
Richmond Spiders (Eastern Virginia Intercollegiate Athletic Association) (1912)
1912	Richmond	1–7	1–2	3rd	
Richmond:		19–33–5	11–12–2		
Total:		19–33–5			
National championship Conference title Conference division title or championship game berth
