= 1912 Richmond Spiders football team =

American college football season

1912 Richmond Spiders football
- Conference: Eastern Virginia Intercollegiate Athletic Association
- Record: 1–7 (1–2 EVIAA)
- Head coach: E. A. Dunlap (6th season)
- Captain: Robert C. Duval Jr.
- Home stadium: Broad Street Park

1912 Eastern Virginia Intercollegiate Athletic Association football standings
	Conf.					Overall
Team	W		L		T	W		L		T
Randolph–Macon $	3	–	0	–	0	5	–	2	–	0
Hampden–Sydney	2	–	1	–	0	2	–	6	–	0
Richmond	1	–	2	–	0	1	–	7	–	0
William & Mary	0	–	3	–	0	0	–	7	–	0
$ – Conference champion

The 1912 Richmond Spiders football team was an American football team that represented Richmond College—now known as the University of Richmond—as a member of the Eastern Virginia Intercollegiate Athletic Association (EVIAA) during the 1912 college football season. Led by E. A. Dunlap in his sixth and final year as head coach, Richmond Richmond compiled an overall record of 1–7 with a mark of 1–2 in conference play, placing third in the EVIAA.

== Schedule ==
Date	Opponent	Site	Result	Source
October 5	Maryland*	Broad Street Park; Richmond, VA	L 0–46	
October 12	Randolph–Macon*	Richmond, VA	L 0–21	
October 19	Richmond Blues*	Richmond, VA	L 7–14	
October 26	at Roanoke*	Salem, VA	L 0–21	
November 2	at Hampden–Sydney*	Hampden Sydney, VA	L 0–13	
November 9	William & Mary	Broad Street Park; Richmond, VA (rivalry)	W 20–0	
November 16	Rock Hill College	Broad Street Park; Richmond, VA	L 7–14	
November 23	Randolph–Macon	Richmond, VA	L 7–28	
*Non-conference game
