= 1912 William & Mary Orange and Black football team =

American college football season

1912 William & Mary Orange and Black football
- Conference: Eastern Virginia Intercollegiate Athletic Association
- Record: 0–7 (0–3 EVIAA)
- Head coach: William J. Young (2nd season)
- Captain: R. C. Tilley

1912 Eastern Virginia Intercollegiate Athletic Association football standings
	Conf.					Overall
Team	W		L		T	W		L		T
Randolph–Macon $	3	–	0	–	0	5	–	2	–	0
Hampden–Sydney	2	–	1	–	0	2	–	6	–	0
Richmond	1	–	2	–	0	1	–	7	–	0
William & Mary	0	–	3	–	0	0	–	7	–	0
$ – Conference champion

The 1912 William & Mary Orange and Black football team represented the College of William & Mary as a member of the Eastern Virginia Intercollegiate Athletic Association (EVIAA) during the 1912 college football season. Led by William J. Young in his second and final season as head coach, William & Mary compiled an overall record of 0–7 with a mark of 0–3 in conference play, placing last out of four teams in the EVIAA.

== Schedule ==
Date	Opponent	Site	Result	Source
September 28	at Virginia*	Madison Hall Field; Charlottesville, VA	L 0–60	
October 5	at Norfolk Light Artillery Blues*	Lafayette Field; Norfolk, VA	L 0–13	
October 12	University College of Medicine*	Williamsburg, VA	L 0–20	
October 26	Virginia Medical*	Williamsburg, VA	L 0–66	
November 2	Randolph–Macon	Williamsburg, VA	L 0–20	
November 9	at Richmond	Broad Street Park; Richmond, VA (rivalry)	L 0–20	
November 16	vs. Hampden–Sydney	Petersburg, VA	L 0–27	
*Non-conference game
