= 1908 Richmond Spiders football team =

American college football season

1908 Richmond Spiders football
- Conference: Eastern Virginia Intercollegiate Athletic Association
- Record: 3–5 (1–2 EVIAA)
- Head coach: E. A. Dunlap (4th season)
- Captains: George B. Wright; Arthur Lankford
- Home stadium: Broad Street Park

1908 Eastern Virginia Intercollegiate Athletic Association football standings
	Conf.					Overall
Team	W		L		T	W		L		T
Randolph–Macon +	2	–	1	–	0	6	–	2	–	0
Hampden–Sydney +	2	–	1	–	0	5	–	4	–	0
William & Mary	1	–	2	–	0	4	–	6	–	1
Richmond	1	–	2	–	0	3	–	5	–	0
+ – Conference co-champions

The 1908 Richmond Spiders football team was an American football team that represented Richmond College—now known as the University of Richmond—as a member of the Eastern Virginia Intercollegiate Athletic Association (EVIAA) during the 1908 college football season. Led by fourth-year head coach E. A. Dunlap, Richmond compiled a record of 3–5.

== Schedule ==
Date	Time	Opponent	Site	Result	Attendance	Source
October 3		Maryland*	Broad Street Park; Richmond, VA	W 22–0		
October 10		Randolph–Macon*	Broad Street Park; Richmond, VA	L 0–16	2,000	
October 17		Washington and Lee*	Broad Street Park; Richmond, VA	L 5–31		
October 24		Gallaudet*	Broad Street Park; Richmond, VA	W 16–12	2,000	
October 31		at North Carolina*	Chapel Hill, NC	L 12–17		
November 7		at Hampden–Sydney	Hampden Sydney, VA	L 17–18		
November 21		William & Mary	Broad Street Park; Richmond, VA (rivalry)	L 18–21		
November 28	3:00 p.m.	Randolph–Macon	Broad Street Park; Richmond, VA	W 12–2		
*Non-conference game
