= List of Arkansas–Monticello Boll Weevils in the NFL draft =

This is a list of Arkansas–Monticello Boll Weevils football players in the NFL draft.

== Key ==
B	Back	K	Kicker	NT	Nose tackle
C	Center	LB	Linebacker	FB	Fullback
DB	Defensive back	P	Punter	HB	Halfback
DE	Defensive end	QB	Quarterback	WR	Wide receiver
DT	Defensive tackle	RB	Running back	G	Guard
E	End	T	Offensive tackle	TE	Tight end

= Pro Bowler
= Hall of Famer

== Selections ==
Year	Round	Pick	Overall	Player	Team	Position
1946	24	8	228	Charley Steed	Philadelphia Eagles	B
1947	5	10	35	Jim Canady	Chicago Bears	B
1973	16	11	401	Fuller Cherry	Los Angeles Rams	DB
