= William J. Young (coach) =

American sports coach (1881–1957)

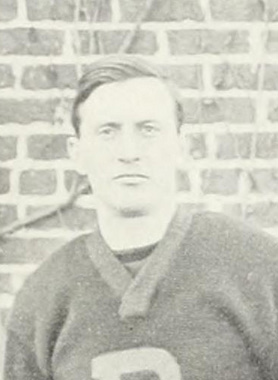
- Young pictured in The Colonial Echo 1912, William & Mary yearbook

Biographical details
- Born: September 9, 1881; Boston, Massachusetts, U.S.
- Died: December 8, 1957 (aged 76); Lewiston, Maine, U.S.

Playing career

Football
- 1904–1906: Springfield Training School
- c. 1907–1910: Penn

Baseball
- 1907: Springfield Training School

Ice hockey
- c. 1907–1911: Penn
- Positions: Fullback, halfback, quarterback, end (football); Third baseman (baseball)

Coaching career (HC unless noted)

Football
- 1911–1912: William & Mary
- 1914: Grove City

Basketball
- 1911–1913: William & Mary
- 1913–1915: Grove City

Baseball
- 1911: William & Mary

Administrative career (AD unless noted)
- 1911–1913: William & Mary
- 1913–1915: Grove City
- 1916–1918: Maine
- 1919–1920: Texas A&M

Head coaching record
- Overall: 1–20–3 (football); 34–19 (basketball); 4–2 (baseball)

William James Young (September 9, 1881 – December 8, 1957) was an American college sports coach, athletics administrator, professor, physician, and health officer. He served as athletic director at the College of William & Mary from 1911 to 1913, Grove City College from 1913 to 1915, the University of Maine from 1916 to 1918, and Texas A&M University from 1919 to 1920. Young was the head football coach at William & Mary from 1911 to 1912 and Grove City in 1914, compiling a career college football coaching record of 1–20–3.

== Early life, playing career, and education ==
Young was born on September 9, 1881, in Boston, to James and Sarah Prouty Young. He played football in 1899 and 1900 at Mechanic Arts High School—now known as John D. O'Bryant School of Mathematics & Science–in Boston and ran track in 1900 and 1901 before graduating in 1901. He then attend the International Young Men's Christian Association Training School—now known as Springfield College—in Springfield, Massachusetts. Young played for the Springfield Training School football team for three seasons, from 1904 to 1906 at the fullback, halfback, quarterback, and end positions. He also played on the school's baseball team as a third baseman in the spring of 1907 and graduated from the school that year.

Young moved on the University of Pennsylvania to pursue of medical degree. There he played for three years on the Penn Quakers football as a halfback and three years on the Penn Quakers men's ice hockey at cover point. He graduated from the University of Pennsylvania School of Medicine—now known as the Perelman School of Medicine at the University of Pennsylvania—with a Doctor of Medicine degree in 1911.

== Coaching, teaching, and medical career ==
In the fall of 1911, Young was elected physical director, college physician, and coach at the College of William & Mary in Williamsburg, Virginia. In 1913, he was appointed the director of the physical department at Grove City College in Grove City, Pennsylvania and took charge of the school's basketball team that fall. In July 1916, Young was elected professor of physical education and director of athletics at the University of Maine, succeeding Edgar Wingard.

During World War I, Young commanded a United States Army field hospital in France, later retiring as a lieutenant colonel in the United States Army Reserve. In 1919, he was appointed as a professor at the Agricultural and Mechanical College of Texas—now known as Texas A&M University–to teach a physical education course required for all first-year students.

In the 1920s, Young was the health officer for the city of Waterville, Maine and later on staff at the Veterans' Hospital at Togus, Maine. He was the district health officer for Androscoggin, Franklin, and Somerset counties in Maine before his retirement in 1951.

== Death ==
Young died on December 8, 1957, at Central Maine General Hospital in Lewiston, Maine, following a two-day-long illness.

== Head coaching record ==
=== Football ===
| Year | Team | Overall | Conference | Standing | Bowl/playoffs |
|---|---|---|---|---|---|
William & Mary Orange and Black (Eastern Virginia Intercollegiate Athletic Association) (1911–1912)
| 1911 | William & Mary | 1–5–2 | 1–2 | 3rd | |
| 1912 | William & Mary | 0–7 | 0–3 | 4th | |
| William & Mary: | | 1–12–2 | 1–5 | | |
Grove City Crimson (Independent) (1914)
| 1914 | Grove City | 0–8–1 | | | |
| Grove City: | | 0–8–1 | | | |
| Total: | | 1–20–3 | | | |

=== Basketball ===
Record table
| Season | Team | Overall | Conference | Standing | Postseason |
|---|---|---|---|---|---|
William & Mary Indians (Independent) (1911–1913)
| 1911–12 | William & Mary | 2–5 | | | |
| 1912–13 | William & Mary | 8–1 | | | |
| William & Mary: | | 10–6 | | | |
Grove City Wolverines (Independent) (1913–1915)
| 1913–14 | Grove City | 11–7 | | | |
| 1914–15 | Grove City | 13–6 | | | |
| Grove City: | | 24–13 | | | |
| Total: | | 34–19 | | | |
