= 1908 William & Mary Orange and White football team =

American college football season

1908 William & Mary Orange and White football
- Conference: Eastern Virginia Intercollegiate Athletic Association
- Record: 4–6–1 (1–2 EVIAA)
- Head coach: George E. O'Hearn (1st season)
- Captain: C. A. Taylor Jr.

1908 Eastern Virginia Intercollegiate Athletic Association football standings
	Conf.					Overall
Team	W		L		T	W		L		T
Randolph–Macon +	2	–	1	–	0	6	–	2	–	0
Hampden–Sydney +	2	–	1	–	0	5	–	4	–	0
William & Mary	1	–	2	–	0	4	–	6	–	1
Richmond	1	–	2	–	0	3	–	5	–	0
+ – Conference co-champions

The 1908 William & Mary Orange and White football team represented the College of William & Mary as a member of the Eastern Virginia Intercollegiate Athletic Association (EVIAA) during the 1909 college football season. Le by first-year head coach George E. O'Hearn, the Orange and White compiled an overall record of 4–6–1.

== Schedule ==
Date	Opponent	Site	Result	Attendance	Source
September 26	at Virginia*	Madison Hall Field; Charlottesville, VA	L 0–11		
October 3	at VMI*	Lexington, VA (rivalry)	L 0–21		
October 12	at North Carolina A&M*	Riddick Stadium; Raleigh, NC	L 0–24		
October 17	vs. Randolph–Macon*	Petersburg, VA	L 0–6		
October 24	Brambleton*	Williamsburg, VA	T 0–0		
October 31	vs. Hampden–Sydney	Petersburg, VA	L 0–10		
November 7	Fort Monroe*	Williamsburg, VA	W 5–0		
November 14	vs. Randolph–Macon	Richmond, VA	L 0–15		
November 21	at Richmond	Broad Street Park; Richmond, VA (rivalry)	W 21–18		
November 26	vs. Hampden–Sydney*	Casino Park; Newport News, VA	W 17–0	2,000+	
December 4	vs. St. Vincent's Academy	Newport News, VA	W 6–5		
*Non-conference game
