= 1912–13 William & Mary Indians men's basketball team =

American college basketball season

1912–13 William & Mary Indians men's basketball
- Conference: Independent
- Record: 8–1
- Head coach: William J. Young (2nd season)

The 1912–13 William & Mary Indians men's basketball team represented the College of William & Mary in intercollegiate basketball during the 1912–13 season. The team finished the season with an 8–1 record. This was the eighth season in program history for William & Mary, whose nickname is now "Tribe."

== Schedule ==
Date time, TV	Rank^{#}	Opponent^{#}	Result	Record	Site city, state
Regular season
*		Richmond Howitzers	W 26–18	1–0	Williamsburg, VA
*		Richmond Howitzers	W 35–31	2–0	Williamsburg, VA
*		Richmond Athletic Club	W 34–15	3–0	Williamsburg, VA
*		Fredericksburg Athletic Club	W 23–15	4–0	Williamsburg, VA
*		Randolph–Macon	W 42–25	5–0	Williamsburg, VA
*		John Marshall Athletic Club	W 27–14	6–0	Williamsburg, VA
*		Hampden–Sydney	W 43–14	7–0	Williamsburg, VA
*		Randolph–Macon	L 23–33	7–1	Williamsburg, VA
*		Hampden–Sydney	W 39–23	8–1	Williamsburg, VA
*Non-conference game. ^{#}Rankings from AP Poll. (#) Tournament seedings in parentheses.
