= Jimmye Laycock Football Center =

Sports facility in Virginia, US

Coordinates: 37.2735°N 76.7152°W

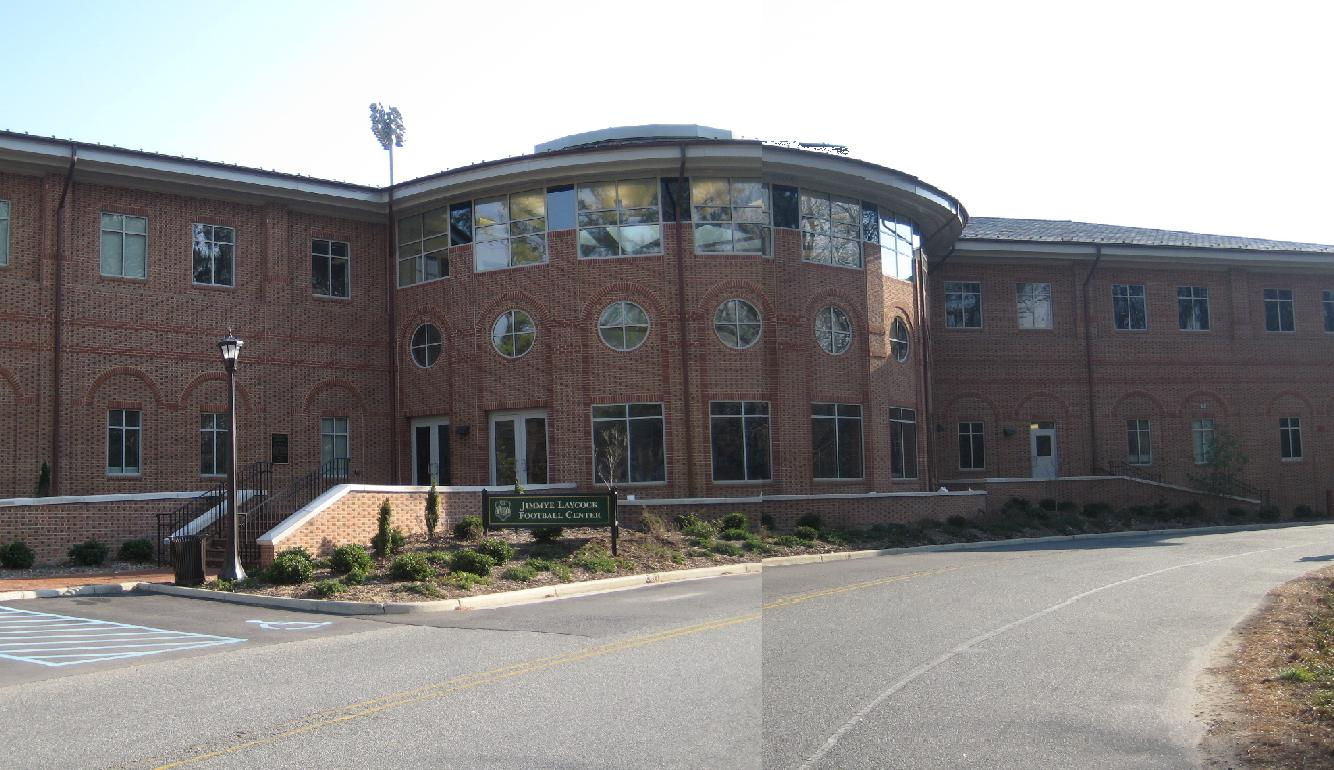
- Interactive map of Jimmye Laycock Football Center
- Location: Williamsburg, VA
- Owner: College of William & Mary

Construction
- Groundbreaking: 2006
- Opened: June 21, 2008
- Cost: $11 million
- Architect: Moseley Architects

Tenant
- William & Mary Tribe football (2008–present)

The Jimmye Laycock Football Center (JLFC) is a football facility for The College of William & Mary Tribe in Williamsburg, Virginia, USA. The $11 million, 30,000-square-foot (2,800 m^{2}) building was constructed right next to Zable Stadium where the Tribe play all home games. The facility is named after William & Mary's most successful football coach Jimmye Laycock, and the cost of the project was funded entirely through private donations.

The JLFC was dedicated on June 21, 2008, and among those in attendance were former William & Mary wide receiver and present Pittsburgh Steelers head coach Mike Tomlin (Class of 1994), former Buffalo Bills head coach Marv Levy, then-Virginia Tech Hokies football head coach Frank Beamer, and former William & Mary athletic director Jim Copeland.
