= J. Merrill Blanchard =

American football player and sports coach (1881–1914)

Biographical details
- Born: April 26, 1881; Winterport, Maine, U.S.
- Died: April 3, 1914 (aged 32); Williamsburg, Virginia, U.S.
- Education: Bowdoin College (1903)

Playing career

Football
- c. 1902: Bowdoin
- Position: Quarterback

Coaching career (HC unless noted)

Football
- 1904–1905: William & Mary
- 1906–1907: Washington University
- 1908–1909: Whitman
- 1910: William & Mary

Basketball
- 1905–1906: William & Mary
- 1906–1908: Washington University

Baseball
- 1905–1906: William & Mary

Administrative career (AD unless noted)
- 1905–1906: William & Mary

Head coaching record
- Overall: 17–29–6 (football); 14–7 (basketball)

Jesse Merrill Blanchard (April 26, 1881 – April 3, 1914) was an American football player, coach of football, basketball, and baseball, and college athletics administrator. He served as the head football coach at the College of William & Mary (1904–1905, 1910), Washington University in St. Louis (1906–1907), and Whitman College (1908–1909).

== Playing career ==
Blanchard played college football as a quarterback at Bowdoin College.

== Coaching career ==
Blanchard was the first head coach of the William & Mary Tribe men's basketball team, in 1905–06. In the inaugural season of William & Mary's basketball program, Blanchard led the team to a 4–1 record. It was his first and last season with the Tribe despite the success. Blanchard also coached the William & Mary football team from 1904 to 1905 and again in 1910, compiling a record of 6–14–2.

== Death ==
Blanchard died on April 3, 1914, at his mother-in-law's home in Williamsburg, Virginia.

== Head coaching record ==
=== Football ===
| Year | Team | Overall | Conference | Standing | Bowl/playoffs |
|---|---|---|---|---|---|
William & Mary Orange and White (Eastern Virginia Intercollegiate Athletic Association) (1904–1905)
| 1904 | William & Mary | 3–3 | 1–1 | | |
| 1905 | William & Mary | 2–4–1 | 0–2 | | |
Washington University (Independent) (1906)
| 1906 | Washington University | 2–2–2 | | | |
Washington University (Missouri Valley Conference) (1907)
| 1907 | Washington University | 1–5–1 | 0–1 | 5th | |
| Washington University: | | 3–7–3 | 0–1 | | |
Whitman Fighting Missionaries (Northwest Conference) (1908–1909)
| 1908 | Whitman | 4–5 | 1–3 | 5th | |
| 1909 | Whitman | 4–3–1 | 1–3 | 5th | |
| Whitman: | | 8–8–1 | 2–6 | | |
William & Mary Orange and Black (Eastern Virginia Intercollegiate Athletic Association) (1910)
| 1910 | William & Mary | 1–7–1 | 1–2 | 3rd | |
| William & Mary: | | 6–14–2 | 2–5 | | |
| Total: | | 17–29–6 | | | |

=== Basketball ===
Record table
| Season | Team | Overall | Conference | Standing | Postseason |
|---|---|---|---|---|---|
William & Mary Indians (Independent) (1905–1906)
| 1905–06 | William & Mary | 4–1 | | | |
| William & Mary: | | 4–1 | | | |
| Total: | | 4–1 | | | |
