= Delta Bowl =

Delta Bowl (defunct)
- Stadium: Crump Stadium
- Location: Memphis, Tennessee
- Operated: 1948–1949

The Delta Bowl was a college football game played at Crump Stadium in Memphis, Tennessee. It was the precursor to the now long-standing Liberty Bowl, the current bowl game held in Memphis since 1965 (although starting at Philadelphia in 1959). The Delta Bowl, which took its name from the nearby Mississippi Delta, played games on New Year's Day in both 1948 and 1949 before folding.

The Delta Bowl became known as the bowl that shocked the football world, landing successful, prestigious teams in its inaugural season, out-performing much more prestigious bowls for the 1948 New Year's Day game.

Their luck followed them into the second season. Bowl officials signed the University of Tulsa to appear in the 1949 game prior to the start of the season with the expectation that the team would perform well; however, Tulsa "tanked," starting the year 0–8 and had to be replaced. Bowl officials managed to sign on another team that ended ranked, William & Mary, which ended the season 20th in the AP poll, another fortuitous stroke for bowl officials.

The first president and organizer of the Delta Bowl was Richard Hyde Dewey, living in Memphis, before moving to Decatur, Alabama, several years later.

At the close of the 1947 football season, Ole Miss was ranked 13th while TCU also had a successful season, both teams surprised by their successes. In fact, the college administrations for both schools had thought their teams would not make it to a bowl game that year before the season started, as there were only 13 bowls. Thus, they happily accepted an invitation to the newly formed Delta Bowl prior to the kick-off of their first games. Surprisingly, both teams surged as the season went on, and the fan bases and coaches reportedly became nervous, knowing they were contractually tied to the upstart new bowl in Memphis, while qualifying for much more prestigious, long-standing bowls. By the end of the season, they were so successful that they made a trip to Memphis to get out of their contracts.

Administrators from both universities together went to Dewey and pled their case. His response was, "We've already pre-sold most of our bowl tickets months in advance, mostly to small businesses who went out on a limb to support us. And if I were to let you out of your contracts now, the mob in Memphis would string me up".

Both teams played in the Delta Bowl that season, 13th-ranked Ole Miss defeating TCU 13-9 on New Year's Day 1948 to a packed stadium.

With local favorite Ole Miss in the game, the 1948 Delta Bowl was a near-sellout, with more than 28,000 fans in attendance. But the 1949 game saw a drop down to about 15,000, putting the game into the red financially. Organizers insisted there would be a third game in 1950, but its primary sponsor, AMVETS, pulled its backing, saying the Delta Bowl had been "successful public relations-wise and publicity-wise, but no funds were derived from it."

== Game results ==
Date	Winning Team		Losing Team		Attendance
January 1, 1948	#13 Ole Miss	13	TCU	9	28,120
January 1, 1949	#17 William & Mary	20	Oklahoma A&M	0	15,069

== See also ==
- List of college bowl games
