= Rube McCray =

American coach and athletics director

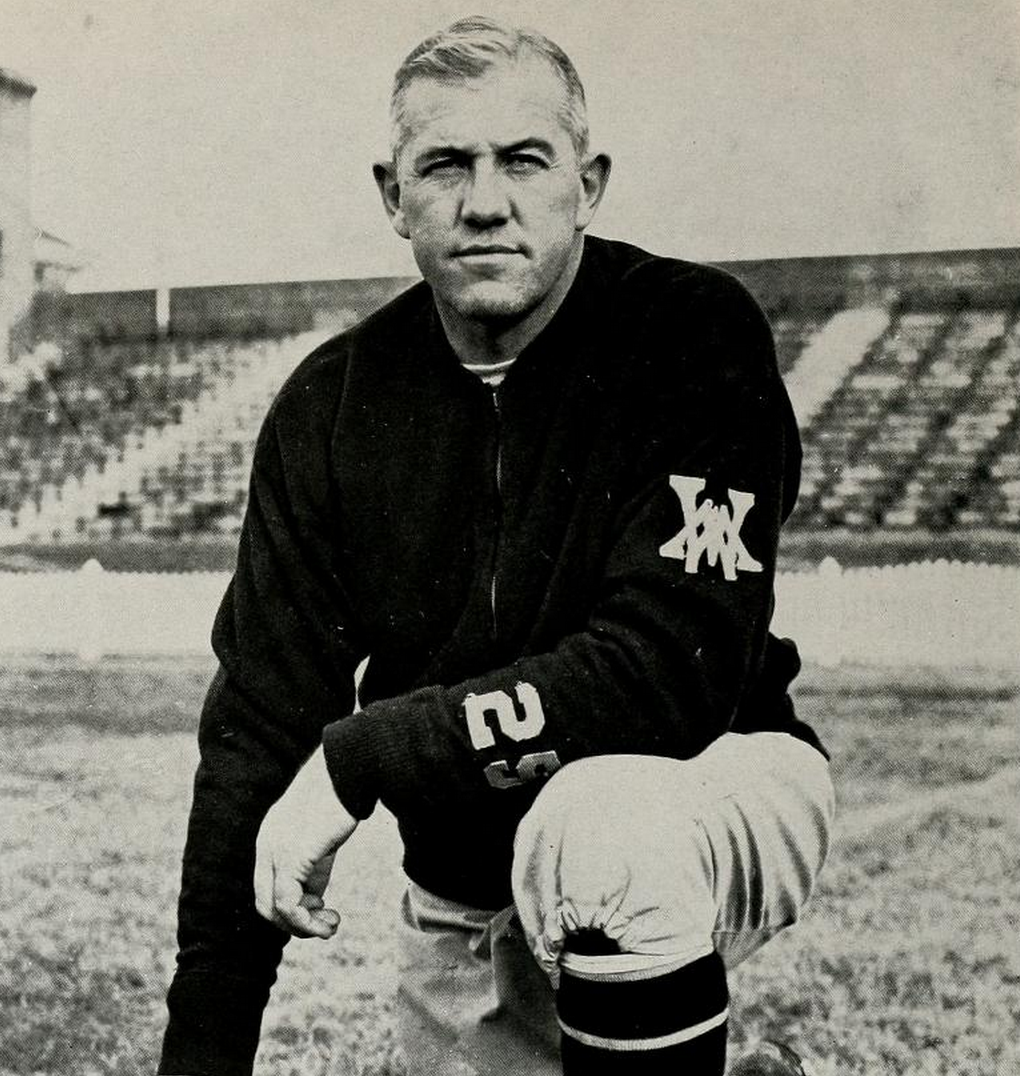
- McCray pictured in Colonial Echo 1947, William & Mary yearbook

Biographical details
- Born: June 13, 1904; Greeneville, Tennessee, U.S.
- Died: November 20, 1972 (aged 68); Lake Waccamaw, North Carolina, U.S.

Playing career
- 1926–1930: Kentucky Wesleyan (football, basketball, baseball)

Coaching career (HC unless noted)

Football
- 1931–1938: Tennessee Wesleyan
- 1939–1943: William & Mary (assistant)
- 1944–1950: William & Mary

Basketball
- 1931–1939: Tennessee Wesleyan
- 1939–1943: William & Mary (assistant)
- 1943–1945: William & Mary

Baseball
- 1939–1941: William & Mary

Administrative career (AD unless noted)
- 1944–1951: William & Mary

Head coaching record
- Bowls: 1–1

Accomplishments and honors

Championships
- Football; 1 SoCon (1947)

Ruben North McCray (June 13, 1904 – November 20, 1972) was the head football, men's basketball, and baseball coach at the College of William & Mary. He also served as their athletic director. Later in life he became a community leader in Lake Waccamaw, North Carolina, winning the state's top Civilian award for "outstanding service."

McCray came to William & Mary in 1939 when Carl Voyles became head football coach. McCray's primary football responsibility was recruiting and working with the freshmen. He became head football coach in 1944, serving through the 1950 season and compiling a 45–22 record. He is second all-time in school history for career coaching wins behind Jimmye Laycock. He also served as head coach for the William & Mary's men's basketball team from 1943 to 1945. He compiled an overall record of 17–21 (4–7 in the Southern Conference).

McCray's best football teams at William & Mary were in 1947 (9–2) with a trip to the Dixie Bowl in Birmingham, Alabama against Arkansas, and in 1948 (7–2–2) and another bowl trip to Memphis, Tennessee in the Delta Bowl against Oklahoma A&M. The Indians lost to Arkansas 21–19, but defeated Oklahoma A&M 20–0.

Prior to coming to William & Mary he coached eight years at Tennessee Wesleyan College, where his teams won six championships and once had a streak of 23 straight victories. His 1938 team won the national junior college football championship.

He resigned from his dual athletic post at William & Mary in 1951 and went into the automobile business as president and general manager of the West Point Motor Co. in West Point, Virginia. He was appointed to fill an unexpired term on the West Point town council from 1956 to 1958.

In 1958, he became director of Boys' Home of North Carolina in Lake Waccamaw and served until his death in 1972. The home served homeless and neglected youths from ages 10–19. The home became a model for such facilities around the country. In May 1972, six months before his death, McCray received the highest recognition of his life. The statewide North Carolina Civitans gave him its "Outstanding Citizen of the Year" Award, recognizing McCray's "outstanding service to youth, his years of coaching and developing character of young men, and his civic and religious activities."

Additionally in 1992, twenty years after he died, Lake Waccamaw named its new public library in his memory.

== Head coaching record ==
=== Football ===
Year	Team	Overall	Conference	Standing	Bowl/playoffs	AP^{#}
William & Mary Tribe (Southern Conference) (1944–1950)
1944	William & Mary	5–2–1	2–1–1	5th		
1945	William & Mary	6–3	4–2	3rd		
1946	William & Mary	8–2	7–1	2nd		
1947	William & Mary	9–2	7–1	1st	L Dixie	14
1948	William & Mary	7–2–2	5–1–1	4th	W Delta	17
1949	William & Mary	6–4	4–2	T–4th		
1950	William & Mary	4–7	3–3	T–9th		
William & Mary:		45–22–3	32–11–2			
Total:						
National championship Conference title Conference division title or championship game berth
^{#}Rankings from final AP Poll.

== See also ==
- William & Mary scandal of 1951
