= W. J. King =

American football coach (1864–1936)

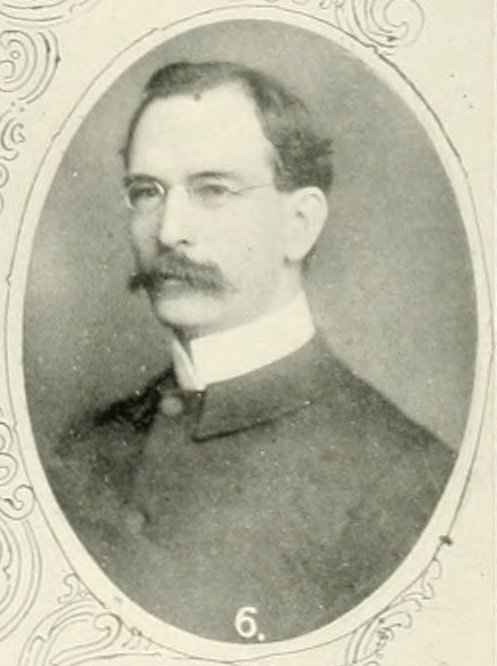
- King pictured in The Colonial Echo 1901, William & Mary yearbook

Biographical details
- Born: January 4, 1864; Port Hope, Ontario, Canada
- Died: July 16, 1936 (aged 72); Newport News, Virginia, U.S.

Coaching career (HC unless noted)
- 1895: Hampden–Sydney
- 1897–1898: William & Mary
- 1900: William & Mary

Administrative career (AD unless noted)
- 1901–1905: William & Mary

Head coaching record
- Overall: 3–5

William John King (January 4, 1864 – July 16, 1936) was a Canadian-American college football coach, athletics administrator, and Presbyterian minister. He served as the head football coach at Hampden–Sydney College's in Hampden Sydney, Virginia for one season, in 1895, and the College of William & Mary for three seasons, in 1897, 1898 and 1900, compiling a career coaching record of 3–5. King was also the athletic director at William & Mary from 1901 to 1905.

King was born on January 4, 1864, in Port Hope, Ontario and immigrated to the United States at the age of 21. He married Hallie Haxall in 1901. King retired to Newport News, Virginia around 1931 and died at his home there on July 16, 1936.

== Head coaching record ==
Year	Team	Overall	Conference	Standing	Bowl/playoffs
Hampden–Sydney Tigers (Independent) (1895)
1895	Hampden–Sydney	1–1			
Hampden-Sydney:		1–1			
William & Mary Orange and White (Independent) (1897–1898)
1897	William & Mary	0–1			
1898	William & Mary	1–1			
William & Mary Orange and White (Independent) (1900)
1900	William & Mary	1–2			
William & Mary:		2–4			
Total:		3–5			
