= Jim Canady =

American gridiron football player (born 1926–2013)

No. 8, 4
- Position: Back

Personal information
- Born: January 14, 1926; Austin, Texas, U.S.
- Died: February 19, 2013 (aged 87); Hico, Texas, U.S.
- Listed height: 5 ft 10 in (1.78 m)
- Listed weight: 178 lb (81 kg)

Career information
- High school: Stephen F. Austin (Austin)
- College: Texas (1943); Arkansas–Monticello (1944); Texas (1945–1947)
- NFL draft: 1947: 5th round, 35th overall pick

Career history
- Chicago Bears (1948–1949); New York Bulldogs (1949); Washington Redskins (1951)*
- * Offseason or practice squad member only

Awards and highlights
- Second-team All-SWC (1946); Third-team All-SWC (1947)

Career NFL statistics
- Games played: 15
- Rushing yards: 99
- Receptions: 5
- Receiving yards: 80
- Interceptions: 2
- Fumble recoveries: 3
- Return yards: 306
- Stats at Pro Football Reference

James Maurice Canady (January 14, 1926 – February 19, 2013) was an American former professional football player. He played in the National Football League (NFL) with the Chicago Bears and New York Bulldogs as a back. He played college football for the Texas Longhorns and Arkansas–Monticello Boll Weevils.

== Early life ==
Canady was born on January 14, 1926, in Austin, Texas. He attended Stephen F. Austin High School in Austin.

== College career ==
Canady played college football for the Texas Longhorns in 1943 and from 1945 to 1947 and the Arkansas–Monticello Boll Weevils in 1944. He was a three-year letterman in 1943 and 1946 to 1947. In 1943, Canady was used on the "B" squad as a blocking back and was described by coaches as "a natural ball hawk".

He enlisted in the Navy and also transferred to Arkansas–Monticello. In 1945, Canady was discharged from the Navy due to a back injury and transferred back to Texas. This injury would eventually prevent him from playing in the 1945 season.

In 1946, Canady was named to the second-team All-Southwest Conference (SWC) squad. He led the conference in receiving yards with 17 catches for 420 yards. Canady also received an AP All-America honorable mention. He was drafted in the 1947 AAFC draft by the Baltimore Colts. Canady returned in 1947, and earned third-team All-SWC honors after scoring four touchdowns. That season, he rushed 93 times for 359 yards.

== Professional career ==
=== Chicago Bears ===
Canady was selected in the fifth round, with the 35th overall selection, by the Chicago Bears in the 1947 NFL draft. He officially signed with the team on February 23, 1948. Canady rushed for eight yards and returned one punt for 37 yards in three games. He played in five games and recorded three interceptions and eight rushing yards until he was traded to the New York Bulldogs on October 27, 1949.

=== New York Bulldogs ===
In 1949, as a member of the New York Bulldogs, Canady played in seven games and had 91 rushing yards, five catches for 80 yards, two interceptions, two fumble recoveries and 269 return yards. He became a free agent on June 1, 1950.

=== Washington Redskins ===
On June 1, 1951, Canady signed with the Washington Redskins. On September 17, he was released by the team.
