= Harold J. Davall =

American college football player and coach

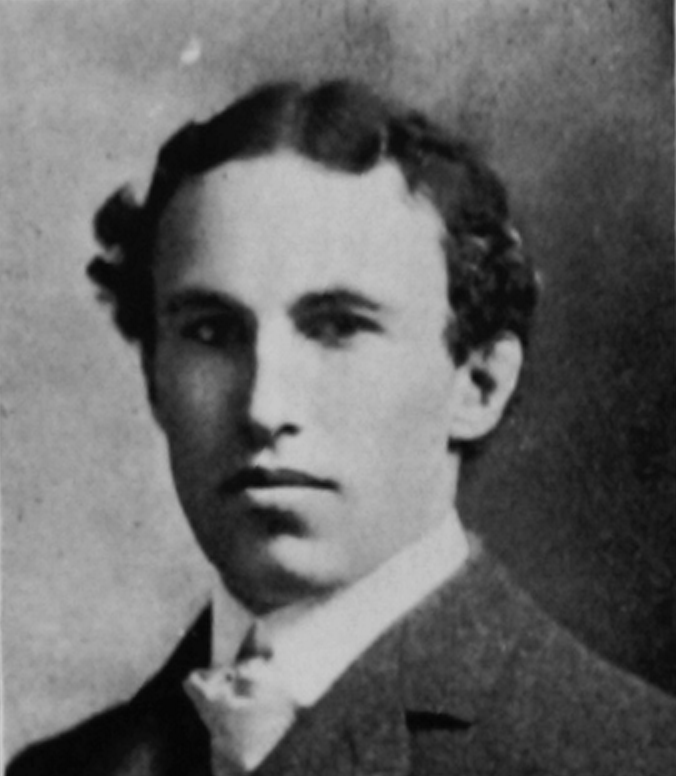
- Davall pictured in the 1901 Class Book of Cornell University

Biographical details
- Born: May 5, 1879; Camden, New Jersey, U.S.
- Died: November 21, 1931 (aged 52); Jamesburg, New Jersey, U.S.

Playing career
- 1898–1899: Cornell
- Position: End

Coaching career (HC unless noted)
- 1902: West Virginia
- 1903: William & Mary

Head coaching record
- Overall: 8–7

Harold Jefferson Davall (May 5, 1879 – November 21, 1931) was an American college football player and coach, engineer, and railroad supervisor. He served as the head football coach at West Virginia University in 1902 and the College of William & Mary in 1903, compiling a career college football coaching record of 8–7. Born in Camden, New Jersey, Davall played football as an End at Cornell University before graduating with an engineering degree.

Davall was married to Agnes C. McLaughlin, a public school teacher, at the Church of the Immaculate Conception in Camden, on June 17, 1907. During World War I, Davall served as a captain in the United States Army Corps of Engineers and was stationed at Camp A. A. Humphreys in Fairfax County, Virginia. He was later supervisor of the Pennsylvania Railroad's Trenton Division. Davall died on November 21, 1931, at his home in Jamesburg, New Jersey, following a heart attack. He was buried in Arlington National Cemetery.

== Head coaching record ==
Year	Team	Overall	Conference	Standing	Bowl/playoffs
West Virginia Mountaineers (Independent) (1902)
1902	West Virginia	7–4			
West Virginia:		7–4			
William & Mary Orange and White (Independent) (1903)
1903	William & Mary	1–3			
William & Mary:		8–7			
Total:		1–3			
