= Crump Stadium =

Stadium in Memphis, Tennessee

- Construction of Crump Stadium nears completion in 1934.
- Interactive map of Crump Stadium
- Address: 305 Cleveland Street; Memphis, Tennessee; United States
- Coordinates: 35.133913°N 90.01826°W
- Owner: Memphis-Shelby County Schools
- Capacity: 4,000 (2006–present)

Crump Stadium is a sports stadium in Memphis, Tennessee, built in 1934 and significantly downsized in 2006. It was built as a Works Progress Administration (WPA) project with a capacity of 7,500. In 1939 it was enlarged to hold 25,000 spectators. In 1948 and 1949 it staged the Delta Bowl, a college football bowl game. In 1947 the Arkansas–Texas football game was played there. The annual Ole Miss–Tennessee & Mississippi State–Tennessee games were also held there in the 1960s. Memphis State University (now University of Memphis) home football games were played there until the completion of Memphis Memorial Stadium (now Liberty Bowl Memorial Stadium) in 1965. The stadium was named for the late Memphis political boss E. H. Crump. It is now home to Central High School.

== History ==
The need for a large stadium in Memphis was first proposed by Clarence Saunders, founder of Piggly Wiggly and owner of the Clarence Saunders Tigers, a semi-professional football team. After success against other established teams, it was thought that Memphis would join the fledgling National Football League, but the Great Depression wiped out Saunders, and Memphis missed out on professional football for the first time. In early 1932, plans for a large concrete stadium with a capacity of 25,000 persons was presented to the Mid-South Fair Association with the promise that if it were built, efforts would be made to land "big-time events of the tennis world". On July 17, 1932, the Memphis Park Commission gave tentative approval for a 25,000-seat stadium to be created at the Fairgrounds. Funds for the stadium were to be raised from the public through a "Buy a Barrel of Cement" project. However, that project was shelved in favor of a new field at Central High School. On August 20, 1932, plans for a new stadium for the City of Memphis were drawn up and approved by the city managers. Funding for this Depression-era project was achieved when, on December 16, 1933, a 3-acre (12,000 m^{2}) athletic field was approved by state and federal Civil Works Authority and construction was completed in 1934. The stadium's original configuration was 7,000 seat capacity on wood bleachers 15 rows high with space for another 4,000 on temporary seating. The stadium was under the control of the City Board of Education, but was available to all levels of teams, from high school to professional

On February 27, 1934, the school board voted to name the new stadium for congressman and former mayor E. H. Crump. Mr. Crump accepted the honor saying he was "pleased" but felt such honors were best served posthumously. The next day, final approval of $35,000 was granted by the Civil Works Authority and work on the project began. By August 1934, the scope of the project had been increased to include a cinder running track and lighting consisting of six 80' towers each holding eight 1000-watt lamps, enabling night football to be played. From the outset, day-night double headers were the norm at the stadium. Despite this type scheduling, the first year of operation ran a deficit, with maintenance and operating costs running from $2,100 to $2,200 and gate receipts and concessions totaling $951.

After a 1936 game between Mississippi and Tennessee drew a record crowd of 11,000, the city decided that it should aggressively market itself as "neutral ground" to the regional teams and promote bringing big games to Memphis. The decision was made to remove the wooden bleachers on the south side of the field, replace them with concrete 46 rows high and increase capacity to 15,000. Control of the facility was transferred to the Park Commission on August 25, 1936, and $100,000 was allocated for the project. A news release from the WPA stated "California has its "Rose Bowl", Louisiana has its "Sugar Bowl" and now Memphis...is to have its "Cotton Bowl." The WPA provided $90,050 and the City of Memphis chipped in another $44,305. City engineer Will Fowler was placed in charge of the project and stated at the time that he envisioned further expansion by creating a bowl which would seat 30,000. Fowler would play an aggressive role in frequent upgrades to the facility over time. 1936 also saw the first intercollegiate football game featuring a Memphis team, Southwestern (now Rhodes College), which at the time was acknowledged to be on the threshold of the "big time". There were 40 games played at Crump Stadium that season.

At the same time Crump Stadium was being expanded, it was decided to create a new field at the fairgrounds. Funds were acquired from the WPA for this new lighted field which Mayor Watkins Overton said would help take pressure off Crump Stadium by giving events with smaller attendance a new venue. The wood bleachers from the south side of Crump Stadium were relocated to the fairgrounds and installed. That field was located in the area now paved as parking between Libertyland and the Mid-South Coliseum. State Teachers College and Southwestern shared this field beginning in 1937 with high school and junior high teams. Both State Teachers and Southwestern had been playing at Hodges Field. In 1937, Southwestern moved five games to Crump Stadium, and State Teachers played two. Both squads played three games at the new fairgrounds facility. The first game played in Crump Stadium by State Teachers was against Tennessee Tech in November 1937. The Teachers would spend the next 27 years at Crump Stadium.

New dressing rooms were constructed under the south stands in 1938. To reach the dressing rooms, teams had to go down steps leading to a tunnel underneath the cinder track and box seats to a second set of stairs which led back up to the entrance passage of the building where the teams turned left or right respectively. 1939 saw more expansion and renovation as the north side wooden bleachers were demolished and concrete stands were erected. The new north stands held just under 10,000 people and cost $186,000. The north stands were 42 rows high as opposed to the south stands which were 46 rows high. In 1940 a 600-seat section was added in the southwest corner along with a new separate entrance and toilet facilities for blacks, allowing those citizens access to the stadium for the first time. Capacity was increased to just over 25,000 and the city was able to attract marquee match-ups from throughout the region. Match-ups between Tennessee, Mississippi, Mississippi State and Arkansas were frequent with even a Texas-Arkansas game played at Crump Stadium.

Crump Stadium would remain in essentially that configuration until 1960, when the City Commission recommended expanding the stadium again. This met with much controversy and opposition from the school board, which needed the land the stadium sat on for expansion of Central High School and to meet open space requirements. In November 1962, the City Commission approved spending of $1.4 million to increase capacity to over 45,000 and a contract was awarded. But less than a year later, the project was halted in favor of a new stadium at the fairgrounds. After Memphis Memorial Stadium was built, control of the facility was transferred back to the Memphis City Schools.

== Closing, demolition and refurbishment ==
The Memphis school district closed Crump Stadium to competition after the 2004 high school football season. In the summer of 2006 the stadium underwent demolition and was replaced with a stadium more appropriately sized for high school football complete with a new track and other track and field amenities. The outer brick wall, original gates and entrances were retained and the name remains "Crump Stadium." High school sporting competitions resumed in the fall of 2007, including high school football regular season and playoff games.
