= 1948 Dixie Bowl =

American college football game

Arkansas Razorbacks	William & Mary Indians
(5–4–1)	(9–1)
21	19
Head coach: John Barnhill	Head coach: Rube McCray
	AP 14
	1	2	3	4	Total
Arkansas	0	14	0	7	21
William & Mary	7	6	6	0	19
- Date: January 1, 1948
- Season: 1947
- Stadium: Legion Field
- Location: Birmingham, Alabama
- Referee: Jimmie C. Higgins (SWC; split crew: SWC, Southern)
- Attendance: 21,000

The 1948 Dixie Bowl was a post-season college football bowl game between the Arkansas Razorbacks and the William & Mary Indians. In the inaugural Dixie Bowl, Arkansas defeated William & Mary, who was ranked fourteenth by the AP Poll, 21–19. The final Dixie Bowl was played on 1949. William & Mary would get their revenge for the game the next year, a 9–0 win in Little Rock, and again in a 20–0 win in Little Rock.

== Setting ==
Arkansas entered the game with a 1–4–1 record in the Southwest Conference, with four non conference wins boosting their record to 5–4–1. William & Mary was 9–1 entering the game.

== Game summary ==
The William & Mary Indians took an early lead when they recovered a fumbled quick-kick, which led to a Jack Cloud touchdown run. Cloud scored again, but the extra point was missed by Indian quarterback Stan Magdziak. Down by 13, Arkansas quarterback Kenny Holland connected with Ross Pritchard for a 59-yard touchdown pass. After a completed extra point by Aubrey Fowler, Hog defender Melvin McGaha intercepted a Magdziak pass, and returned it for a 70-yard touchdown. Fowler again added the PAT, giving the Razorbacks a 14–13 lead.

The Indians struck again in the third quarter, when Magdziak hit Henry Bland for a touchdown, but the extra point was no good for a second time. Arkansas would strike last, however, when Leon Campbell's 7-yard touchdown run gave the Hogs the lead with five minutes remaining. Arkansas moved their bowl record to 1–0–2 with the win, while William & Mary dropped to 0–1.

=== Scoring summary ===
Scoring summary

Quarter	Time	Drive			Team	Scoring information	Score	
Quarter	Time	Plays	Yards	TOP	Team	Scoring information	ARK	W&M
1			6		W&M	Jack Cloud 1-yard touchdown run, Stan Magdziak kick good	0	7
2			78		W&M	Jack Cloud 2-yard touchdown run, Stan Magdziak kick no good	0	13
2					ARK	Ross Pritchard 59-yard touchdown reception from Kenny Holland, Aubrey Fowler kick good	7	13
2			70		ARK	Interception returned 70 yards for touchdown by Melvin McGaha, Aubrey Fowler kick good	14	13
3					W&M	Henry Bland 6-yard touchdown reception from Stan Magdziak, Stan Magdziak kick no good	14	19
4			97		ARK	Leon Campbell 7-yard touchdown run, Aubrey Fowler kick good	21	19
"TOP" = time of possession. For other American football terms, see Glossary of American football.							21	19
