= Jimmye Laycock =

American football player and coach (born 1948)

Biographical details
- Born: February 6, 1948 (age 78); Hamilton, Virginia, U.S.

Playing career
- 1966–1969: William & Mary
- Position: Quarterback

Coaching career (HC unless noted)
- 1970: Newport News HS (VA) (assistant)
- 1971–1972: Clemson (assistant)
- 1973–1974: The Citadel (off. backfield)
- 1975–1976: Memphis State (QB)
- 1977–1979: Clemson (OC/QB)
- 1980–2018: William & Mary

Head coaching record
- Overall: 249–194–2
- Bowls: 2–0
- Tournaments: 7–10 (NCAA D-I-AA/D-I playoffs)

Accomplishments and honors

Championships
- 1 Yankee (1996); 2 A-10 (2001, 2004); 2 CAA (2010, 2015); 2 Yankee Mid-Atlantic Division (1993–1994)

Awards
- AFCA FCS Region 1 Coach of the Year (2010)

Jimmye McFarland Laycock (born February 6, 1948) is an American former college football coach. He served as the head football coach at the College of William & Mary from 1980 through 2018, retiring with the third-longest continuous head coaching tenure in NCAA Division I football history. He amassed an overall record of 249 wins, 194 losses, and two ties. Laycock graduated from William & Mary in 1970 and played quarterback under legendary coaches Marv Levy and Lou Holtz. Prior to taking over the Tribe head coaching position, Laycock coached at Newport News High School, Clemson University, The Citadel, and the University of Memphis.

Laycock has been the most successful head coach in the history of William & Mary Tribe football, leading the team to 24 winning seasons and 12 post-season appearances, including two national playoff semi-final appearances in 2004 and 2009. In 2010, he recorded his 200th win as an FCS head coach, making him only the third to reach that mark. He eventually retired with 249 wins in all and 242 at the FCS level, the latter being the record for that level. (Note: For statistical purposes, the NCAA defines an "FCS coach" as anyone who coached 10 seasons or more at an FCS school, even if he earned wins at other non-FCS programs, or at the same school when it was not competing in FCS. Using the stricter criterion of counting only wins recorded while the head coach of a program that was competing in FCS, only Laycock, Roy Kidd, Jerry Moore, Andy Talley, and Tim Murphy have 200 wins with an FCS program.)

On June 21, 2008, William & Mary officially opened its state-of-the-art football facility which was named after him. It is called the Jimmye Laycock Football Center and it sits adjacent to Zable Stadium.

== Personal ==
Laycock is from Hamilton, Virginia. He attended Loudoun Valley High School and lettered in football, basketball and baseball. He earned 12 varsity letters and had his football jersey number retired. He was also inducted into the Loudoun Valley High School Athletic Hall of Fame. In 2010, he was selected to the Hampton Roads Sports Hall of Fame, honoring those who have contributed to sports in southeastern Virginia. He was inducted into that Hall of Fame in October 2010. Today, he is married to Deidre Connelly, a sports psychology consultant at William & Mary. He has four children — three with Connelly.

== Head coaching record ==
Year	Team	Overall	Conference	Standing	Bowl/playoffs	NCAA/TSN/STATS^{#}
William & Mary Tribe (NCAA Division I-A independent) (1980–1981)
1980	William & Mary	2–9				
1981	William & Mary	5–6				
William & Mary Tribe (NCAA Division I-AA Independent) (1982–1992)
1982	William & Mary	3–8				
1983	William & Mary	6–5				
1984	William & Mary	6–5				
1985	William & Mary	7–4				
1986	William & Mary	9–3			L NCAA Division I-AA First Round	8
1987	William & Mary	5–6				
1988	William & Mary	6–4–1			W Ivy	
1989	William & Mary	8–3–1			L NCAA Division I-AA First Round	T–10
1990	William & Mary	10–3			L NCAA Division I-AA Quarterfinal	7
1991	William & Mary	5–6				
1992	William & Mary	9–2			W Ivy	13
William & Mary Tribe (Yankee Conference) (1993–1996)
1993	William & Mary	9–3	7–1	1st (Mid-Atlantic)	L NCAA Division I-AA First Round	10
1994	William & Mary	8–3	6–2	T–1st (Mid-Atlantic)		19
1995	William & Mary	7–4	5–3	T–3rd (Mid-Atlantic)		19
1996	William & Mary	10–3	7–1	1st (Mid-Atlantic)	L NCAA Division I-AA Quarterfinal	7
William & Mary Tribe (Atlantic 10 Conference) (1997–2006)
1997	William & Mary	7–4	4–4	T–4th (Mid-Atlantic)		
1998	William & Mary	7–4	4–4	T–2nd (Mid-Atlantic)		17
1999	William & Mary	6–5	5–3	T–4th		
2000	William & Mary	5–6	4–4	T–4th		
2001	William & Mary	8–4	7–2	T–1st	L NCAA Division I-AA First Round	17
2002	William & Mary	6–5	5–4	4th		
2003	William & Mary	5–5	4–4	6th		
2004	William & Mary	11–3	7–1	T–1st	L NCAA Division I-AA Semifinal	3
2005	William & Mary	5–6	3–5	T–3rd (South)		
2006	William & Mary	3–8	1–7	6th (South)		
William & Mary Tribe (Colonial Athletic Association) (2007–2018)
2007	William & Mary	4–7	2–6	5th (South)		
2008	William & Mary	7–4	5–3	4th (South)		20
2009	William & Mary	11–3	6–2	3rd (South)	L NCAA Division I Semifinal	4
2010	William & Mary	8–4	6–2	T–1st	L NCAA Division I Second Round	10
2011	William & Mary	5–6	3–5	7th		
2012	William & Mary	2–9	1–7	9th		
2013	William & Mary	7–5	4–4	T–5th		
2014	William & Mary	7–5	4–4	5th		
2015	William & Mary	9–4	6–2	T–1st	L NCAA Division I Second Round	12
2016	William & Mary	5–6	3–5	T–8th		
2017	William & Mary	2–9	0–8	12th		
2018	William & Mary	4–6	3–4	8th		
William & Mary:		249–194–2	112–98			
Total:		249–194–2				
National championship Conference title Conference division title or championship game berth
^{#}Rankings from final NCAA Division I-AA Football Committee poll from 1986 to 1992, The Sports Network poll from 1993 to 2010, STATS poll in 2015.

== See also ==
- List of college football career coaching wins leaders
- List of college football career coaching losses leaders
