= George E. O'Hearn =

American football and baseball player and coach (1880–1967)

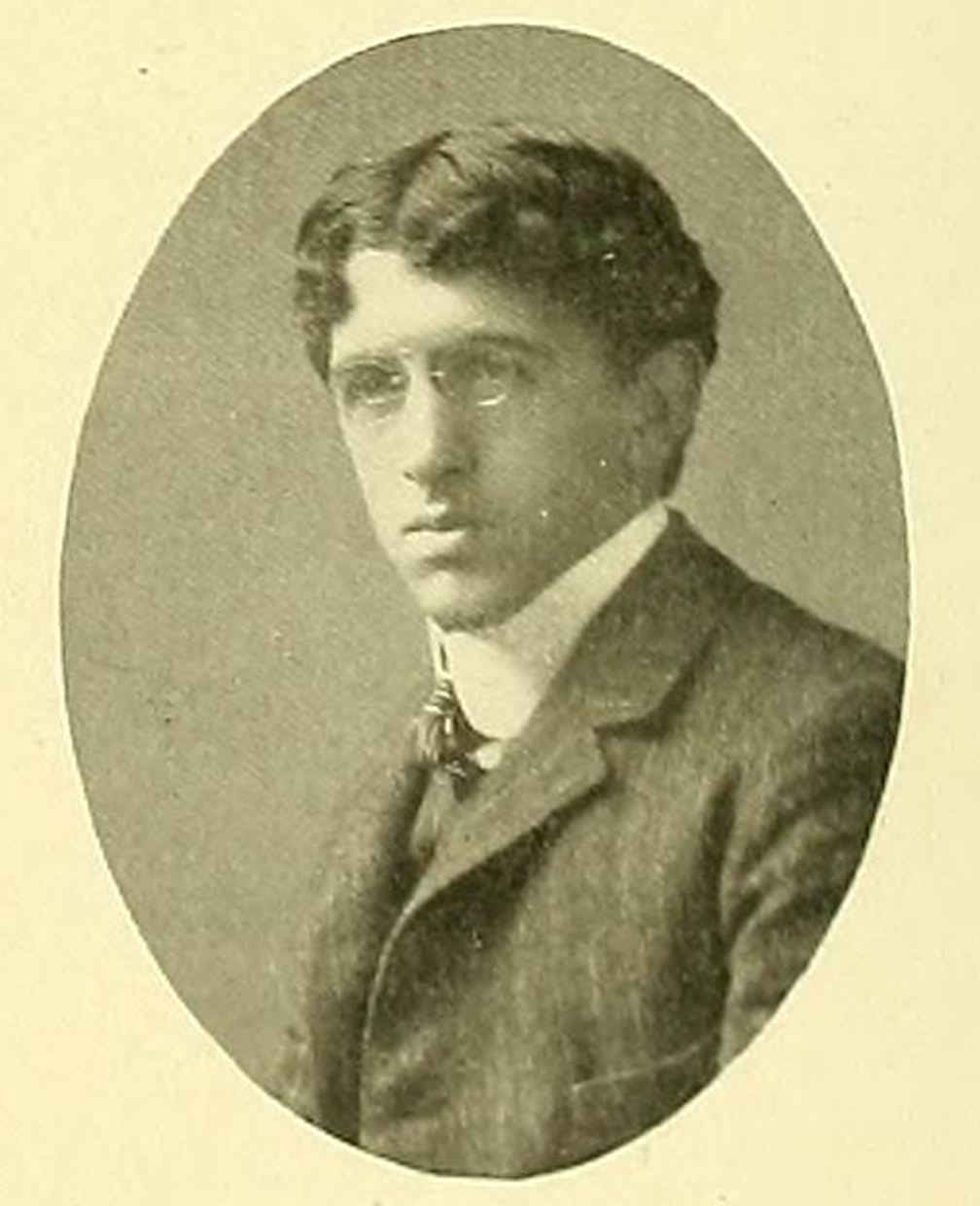
- O'Hearn pictured in Index 1904, Massachusetts Agricultural College yearbook

Biographical details
- Born: June 6, 1880; Pittsfield, Massachusetts, U.S.
- Died: February 1, 1967 (aged 86); Pittsfield, Massachusetts, U.S.

Playing career

Football
- c. 1903–1904: Massachusetts

Baseball
- 1900–1904: Massachusetts
- Positions: Halfback (football); Third baseman (baseball)

Coaching career (HC unless noted)

Football
- 1906: Massachusetts
- 1908–1909: William & Mary

Baseball
- 1909–1910: William & Mary

Head coaching record
- Overall: 11–17–2 (football)

Accomplishments and honors

Championships
- Football; 1 EVIAA (1909)

George Edmund O'Hearn (June 6, 1880 – February 1, 1967) was an American football and baseball player and coach. He served as the head football coach at Massachusetts Agricultural College—now the University of Massachusetts Amherst—in 1906 and at The College of William & Mary from 1908 to 1909, compiling a career college football record of 11–17–2. O'Hearn was also the head baseball coach at William & Mary from 1909 to 1910.

A native of Pittsfield, Massachusetts, O'Hearn played football as a halfback and baseball as a third baseman at Massachusetts Agricultural College. He was captain of the 1903 Massachusetts Aggies football team. O'Hearn on February 1, 1967, at St. Luke's Hospital—now known as Providence Court—in Pittsfield.

== Head coaching record ==
=== Football ===
Year	Team	Overall	Conference	Standing	Bowl/playoffs
Massachusetts Aggies (Independent) (1906)
1906	Massachusetts	1–7–1			
Massachusetts:		1–7–1			
William & Mary Orange and White (Eastern Virginia Intercollegiate Athletic Association) (1908–1909)
1908	William & Mary	4–6–1	1–2	T–3rd	
1909	William & Mary	6–4	2–1	T–1st	
William & Mary:		10–10–1	3–3		
Total:		11–17–2			
