= Ivy Bowl =

American college football games in Japan

The Ivy Bowl (also known as the Epson Ivy Bowl) was an international college football game played between an American, 43-man all-star team (composed of only Ivy League players) versus a team of college all-stars from Japan. The first Epson Ivy Bowl occurred on January 8, 1989, and the final game occurred at the conclusion of the 1996 NCAA Division I-AA football season. The United States won every match-up. The wins, because they were not between two NCAA-affiliated schools and some of the years were mixed school (all-star) teams do not count toward official win–loss records.

Despite the fact that the College of William & Mary was not a member of the Ivy League, they were chosen to participate in the 1988 and 1992 seasons' Epson Ivy Bowls. Long considered a "public ivy", William & Mary was the only true non-Ivy League school to send players to Japan.

== Game results ==
Game	Date	Winner	Score	Loser	Score	Venue	MVP	Fighting Spirit Award	Ref
1	January 8, 1989	William & Mary	73	Japan All-Stars	3	Yokohama Stadium			
2	December 23, 1989	Ivy League All-Stars	49	Japan All-Stars	17	Yokohama Stadium	Rick McIntyre （Harvard）	Ryusei Kajiyama （Nihon）	
3	December 24, 1990	Ivy League All-Stars	47	Japan All-Stars	10	Yokohama Stadium	Steve Hooper （Penn）	Kazuyuki Shinbori （Hosei）	
4	December 23, 1991	Ivy League All-Stars	24	Japan All-Stars	0	Tokyo Dome	John Makunifu （Cornell）	jin Shirawachi （Meiji）	
5	January 1, 1993	Ivy League All-Stars	68	Japan All-Stars （excluding Nihon University）	3	Tokyo Dome	Matt Bashika （Dartmouth）		
5	January 1, 1993	William & Mary	35	Nihon	19	Tokyo Dome	Shawn Knight		
6	January 8, 1994	Ivy League All-Stars	31	Japan All-Stars	14	Tokyo Dome	Jay Fiedler （Dartmouth）	Masafumi Kawaguchi （Ritsumeikan）	
7	January 8, 1995	Ivy League All-Stars	20	Japan All-Stars	10	Hankyu Nishinomiya Stadium	Brian Bassett （Columbia）	Tetsuya Akiyama （Nihon）	
8	January 7, 1996	Ivy League All-Stars	35	Japan All-Stars	16	Hankyu Nishinomiya Stadium	John Harper （Columbia）	Toru Kojima （Tokai）	

== Game participants ==
=== 1989 ===
==== Ivy League All-Stars ====
Player	Position	College
Evan Parke	CB	Cornell
Bryan Keys	RB	Penn
Steve Johnson		
Matt Pollard	K	Columbia
Matt Less	TE	Columbia
Danny Clark	QB	Brown
Nick Stanham	WR	Dartmouth
Malcolm Glover	QB	Penn
John Francis	DB	Brown
Mark Bianchi	WR	Dartmouth
Frank Leal	DB	Princeton
Mark Ligos	LB	Penn
Dave Amodio		
Steve Kapfer	LB	Brown
Judd Garrett	RB	Princeton
Rick McIntire		
Rich Huff	DB	Yale
Chris Finn		
Mike Holt	DB	Columbia
Jon Skinner	RB	Brown
Mike Ciotti	C	Yale
Franco Pagnanelli		Princeton
Scott Wollam	DL	Yale
Harris Siskind		
Dave Tauber	OL	Brown
Bob Surace	C	Princeton
Greg Gicewicz	DL	Harvard
Gerald Mahon	OL	Harvard
Kevin Luensmann		
Glover Lawrence	DL	Yale
Steve Harrison		Brown
Drew Fraser		
Kevin Collins		
Jim Griffin	TE	Yale
Dave Whaley	WR	Penn
Tom Parker	WR	Dartmouth
Pete Masloski		
Mike Vollmer		
Bob Paschall	DL	Columbia
Rich Puccio		

===== Coaches =====
- Maxie Baughan - Head Coach
- Johnny Unitas
- Pete Retzlaff
- Mark Baughan

==== Japan All-Stars ====
- Kuniaki Miura
- Ryota Watanabe
- Kenichi Kotani
- Shoji Sagawa
- Kenji Kato
- Kenji Udagawa
- Naritoshi Shibata
- Hiroyiki Takeda
- Kazuhiko Yamaguchi
- Naoji Matsuzaki
- Juichi Suzuki
- Kimihiro Tsuchiya
- Satoshi Iwata
- Seiji Funakoshi
- Yoshiki Hayami
- Minoru Hayashi
- Ryusei Kajiyama
- Hiroyuki Masuda
- Seigo Arimatsu
- Hajime Kobayashi
- Tetsuya Sadai
- Masaki Ogawa
- Kenji Suzuki
- Toshihiko Yamaguchi
- Yoshihito Itakura
- Satoki Kato
- Noriyuki Oshima
- Shigeo Yokata
- Tetsuro Kawano
- Kazunori Jinbo
- Takanori Nozawa
- Hirotaka Nanba
- Minoru Shiota
- Yoshihiro Iizuka
- Akira Imai
- Takayuki Ota
- Yoshinao Sugawara
- Masakazu Terashima
- Yuzo Ichijo
- Kei Nishiyama
- Manabu Kamoshida
- Katsuhiko Togo
- Makoto Ishii
- Nachi Abe
- Yasutomo Motohashi
- Atsushi Oyori
- Hiroshi Kashiwagi
- Toshihiro Moritomo
- Kichi Nishiyama
- Tomohiro Yanase
- Kazuho Suzuki
- Kenichiro Imada
- Masaaki Kitami
- Yuichi Shintaku
- Tsutomu Kusakabe
- Ryuta Tatsumi
- Maki Yoshida
- Tomohiro Tsuruta
- Hiroshi Fujii
- Motohide Takano
- Yasuhiro Kishimoto
- Koji Owada
- Masaichiro Kanamoto
- Tadashi Kaneko
- Takuya Otsuki
- Nobuharu Kondo
- Shinichi Yokote
- Koji Suzuki
- Sojiro Harada
- Kenichi Fujiwara
- Toshiei Seki
- Yosei Maeno
- Takao Asakura
- Takuya Iwasaki
- Atsuya Yoshizawa
- Shunji Mori
- Jun Simizu
- Shinji Maehara
- Iwao Yoshino
- Toshikazu Iino
- Kinya Shibayama

== See also ==
- List of college bowl games
