= 1970 Tangerine Bowl =

American college football game

William & Mary Indians	Toledo Rockets
(5–6)	(11–0)
Southern Conference	MAC
12	40
Head coach: Lou Holtz	Head coach: Frank Lauterbur
	AP / Coaches; 15 / 17
	1	2	3	4	Total
William & Mary	6	0	0	6	12
Toledo	0	7	13	20	40
- Date: December 28, 1970
- Season: 1970
- Stadium: Tangerine Bowl
- Location: Orlando, Florida
- MVP: Chuck Ealey, Toledo (offensive); Vince Hubler, William & Mary (defensive)
- Favorite: Toledo by 14
- Referee: Tom Dooley
- Attendance: 15,664

The 1970 Tangerine Bowl was held on December 28, 1970, at the Tangerine Bowl stadium in Orlando, Florida. The game pitted the #15 AP-ranked Toledo Rockets against the William & Mary Indians (now the Tribe), and ended with a 40–12 victory for the Rockets. This was the 25th playing of the Tangerine Bowl, a former name of what is now called the Citrus Bowl.

== Game summary ==
Although William & Mary scored first and last in the game, Toledo scored six touchdowns in-between, to win by a 28-point margin. Toledo quarterback Chuck Ealey was named outstanding offensive player, while Vince Hubler of William & Mary was named outstanding defensive player.

== Statistics ==
Statistics	Toledo	William & Mary
First downs	26	15
Rushing yards	326	139
Passes attempted	20	22
Passes completed	12	13
Passes intercepted	0	2
Passing yards	128	127
Yards penalized	100	66
Punts–average	2–38	7–38
Fumbles lost	3	0

== Scoring summary ==
Scoring summary

Quarter	Time	Drive			Team	Scoring information	Score	
Quarter	Time	Plays	Yards	TOP	Team	Scoring information	W&M	TOL
1	0:54	6	39		W&M	Todd Bushnell 10-yard touchdown run, Bill Geiger kick wide	6	0
2	12:04				TOL	Charles Cole 1-yard touchdown run, Thomas Duncan kick good	6	7
3					TOL	Tony Harris 15-yard touchdown run, Thomas Duncan kick good	6	14
3	2:47	11	86		TOL	Joe Schwartz 9-yard touchdown run, Thomas Duncan kick blocked by Bill Uzzell	6	20
4					TOL	Don Fair 3-yard touchdown reception from Chuck Ealey, Thomas Duncan kick good	6	27
4					TOL	Chuck Ealey 3-yard touchdown run, Thomas Duncan kick no good	6	33
4					TOL	Interception returned 52 yards for touchdown by John Niezgoda, Thomas Duncan kick good	6	40
4	1:37				W&M	Steve Regan 1-yard touchdown run, 2-point pass failed	12	40
"TOP" = time of possession. For other American football terms, see Glossary of American football.							12	40
