= William & Mary Tribe football =

College football team

2026 William & Mary Tribe football team
- First season: 1893; 133 years ago
- Athletic director: Brian Mann
- Head coach: Mike London; 7th season, 43–31 (.581)
- Location: Williamsburg, Virginia
- Stadium: Zable Stadium (capacity: 12,672)
- Field: Cary Field
- NCAA division: Division I FCS
- Conference: Patriot League
- Colors
- All-time record: 620–603–39 (.507)
- Bowl record: 1–2 (.333)

Conference championships
- EVIAA: 1907, 1909 VIAC: 1927, 1929, 1930, 1933, 1934, 1935 SoCon: 1942, 1947, 1966, 1970 Yankee: 1996 A10: 2001, 2004 CAA: 2010, 2015, 2022
- Rivalries: Richmond (rivalry); VMI (rivalry); Delaware (dormant); James Madison (dormant); Old Dominion (dormant); Villanova; Virginia
- Fight song: "Tribe Fight Song"
- Outfitter: Under Armour
- Website: TribeAthletics.com

The William & Mary Tribe are a college football team representing the College of William & Mary in Williamsburg, Virginia. William & Mary competes in the Patriot League as a football-only NCAA Division I Football Championship Subdivision member while the Tribe's primary athletics compete in the Coastal Athletic Association. They are currently coached by Mike London. He succeeds Jimmye Laycock, who was the head coach of the Tribe for 39 years.

In 2008, William & Mary opened the Jimmye Laycock Football Center, housing the Tribe locker room, football players' classroom study sessions and tape review rooms.

The College of William & Mary has transitioned through several official nicknames since its athletic program began in 1893. From 1893 to 1916, William & Mary football players were known as the Orange and White because those were the old official school colors. From 1916 to 1977, all William & Mary athletes were known as the Indians. Since 1978, they have been known as the Tribe.

== History ==
The William & Mary Tribe football team had sustained success during Jimmye Laycock's tenure. Since his taking over as head coach, W&M enjoyed over 25 winning seasons and 10 playoff appearances, the 23rd most appearances of any FCS program. The long-time head-coach led the Tribe to multiple playoff appearances, including the national semifinal game on two occasions. Most recently, the Tribe lost in a quarterfinal matchup against Montana State University in 2022. In 2009 the Tribe also reached the semifinal against eventual champions Villanova in 2009, losing by a single point. The team has also appeared in three bowl games: the 1948 Dixie Bowl, 1949 Delta Bowl and 1970 Tangerine Bowl. The Tribe are 1–2 in those games, with the lone win being a 20–0 victory over Oklahoma A&M in 1949.

== Rivalries ==
William & Mary's traditional rival in football is the University of Richmond. William & Mary and Richmond have met 134 times since 1898, making the rivalry (sometimes referred to as "the South's oldest rivalry") the fourth most-played in Division I college football. Only Lafayette–Lehigh, Princeton–Yale, and Harvard–Yale have played more games. The winner of this annual W&M–Richmond match-up claims the Capital Cup (previously known as the I-64 Trophy), named for the last two Virginia state capitals, Richmond and Williamsburg.

In the 21st century, William & Mary has also developed a rivalry with Villanova University. William & Mary and Villanova's football teams have closely mirrored each other as they have shifted conferences, moving from the Atlantic 10 to the newly formed Colonial Athletic Association in 2006, then to the Patriot League in 2026. Their most notable game was in the 2009 NCAA FCS Semifinal, losing by a score of 13-14. Villanova would go on to win the National Championship.

Aside from William & Mary's lengthy Capital Cup rivalry with the University of Richmond, the Tribe also hold historic rivalries with in-state opponents like James Madison University and the Virginia Military Institute, as well as out-of-state opponents like the University of Delaware. William & Mary also maintains older, less intense rivalries with the VMI Keydets from its days in the Southern Conference, and the Virginia Cavaliers as part of the unofficial Jefferson Cup, named after Thomas Jefferson, who attended the College of William & Mary before founding the University of Virginia. The Tribe holds non-conference rivalries against the Old Dominion Monarchs and the James Madison Dukes of the Sun Belt Conference, both competing in CAA Football before joining the FBS in 2014 and 2022, respectively. The winner of the Old Dominion-William & Mary Game receives the Silver Mace.

=== Series records ===
- Records through December 23, 2025

Opponent (Rivalry)	Match Ups	Record	Next Game
Richmond (Capital Cup)	136	64–67–5	November 21, 2026
VMI (Rivalry)	89	54–33–2	September 4, 2027
Virginia Tech (dormant)	64	18–42–4	dormant
Delaware (Rivalry)	44	19–25	dormant
James Madison (dormant)	41	17–27	dormant
Virginia (Jefferson Cup)	40	6–33–1	September 25, 2027
Villanova (Rivalry)	38	20–17–1	August 29, 2026

== Currently in the NFL ==
Current as of the 2023 football season.

=== Front Office ===
- Mike Potts (Class of 2008) – Assistant general manager for the Cincinnati Bengals

=== Coaches ===
- Joe Brady (Class of 2012) – Head coach of the Buffalo Bills
- DJ Mangas (Class of 2011) – Offensive Quality Control for the Buffalo Bills
- Sean McDermott (Class of 1998) – Former head coach of the Buffalo Bills
- Kevin Rogers (Class of 1974) – Senior offensive assistant for the Cleveland Browns
- Ryan Smith (Class of 2014) – Cornerbacks coach for the Arizona Cardinals
- Mike Tomlin (Class of 1995) – head coach of the Pittsburgh Steelers; second youngest head coach in NFL history to win the Super Bowl (36 years old; Super Bowl XLIII)

=== NFL Players ===
- Charles Grant (Class of 2025) – offensive tackle for the Las Vegas Raiders
- Nate Lynn (Class of 2023) – linebacker for the Tennessee Titans
- Bill Murray (Class of 2020) – offensive guard for the Indianapolis Colts
- Luke Rhodes (Class of 2016) – linebacker and long snapper for the Indianapolis Colts; two-time All-Pro selection (2020, 2021)
- Colby Sorsdal (Class of 2023) – offensive tackle for the Detroit Lions
- Owen Wright (Class of 2020) – running back for the Tampa Bay Buccaneers

=== CFL Players ===
- Devonte Dedmon (Class of 2019) – wide receiver and kick returner for the Ottawa Redblacks; John Agro Special Teams Award recipient (2021)
- Marcus Barnes (Class of 2025)

== Championships ==
=== Conference championships ===
The Tribe have won 18 conference championships, with eight won outright.

Year	Coach	Conference	Overall record	Conference record
1907†	James E. Barry	EVIAA	6–3	2–0–1
1909†	George E. O'Hearn	EVIAA	6–4	2–1
1927	J. Wilder Tasker	Virginia	4–5–1	2–0–1
1929	Branch Bocock	Virginia	8–2	5–0
1930	Branch Bocock	Virginia	7–2–1	5–0
1933†	John Kellison	Virginia	6–5	2–1
1934†	John Kellison	Virginia	2–6	2–1
1935	Thomas Dowler	Virginia	3–4–3	1–1–1
1942	Carl M. Voyles	SoCon	9–1–1	4–0
1947	Rube McCray	SoCon	9–2	7–1
1966†	Marv Levy	SoCon	5–4–1	4–1–1
1970	Lou Holtz	SoCon	5–7	3–1
1996	Jimmye Laycock	Yankee	10–3	7–1
2001†	Jimmye Laycock	Atlantic 10	8–4	7–2
2004†	Jimmye Laycock	Atlantic 10	11–3	7–1
2010†	Jimmye Laycock	CAA	8–4	6–2
2015†	Jimmye Laycock	CAA	9–4	6–2
2022†	Mike London	CAA	10–1	7–1

† Co-championship

=== Division championships ===
The Tribe have one division title, won during their time in the Yankee Conference.

Year	Coach	Conference	Division	Conference record
1993	Jimmye Laycock	Yankee Conference	Mid-Atlantic Division	7–1

== Bowl games ==
William & Mary have participated in three bowl games. The Tribe have a record of 1–2.

Date	Bowl	Opponent	Result
January 1, 1948	Dixie Bowl	Arkansas	L 19–21
January 1, 1949	Delta Bowl	Oklahoma A&M	W 20–0
December 28, 1970	Tangerine Bowl	Toledo	L 12–40

== Playoffs ==
The Tribe have participated in the playoffs 11 times, with 18 total playoff games played for a record of 8–11.

Year	Round	Opponent	Result
1986	First Round	Delaware	L 17–51
1989	First Round	Furman	L 10–24
1990	First Round; Quarterfinals	Massachusetts; Central Florida	W 38–0; L 38–52
1993	First Round	McNeese State	L 28–34
1996	First Round; Quarterfinals	Jackson State; Northern Iowa	W 45–6; L 35–38
2001	First Round	Appalachian State	L 27–40
2004	First Round; Quarterfinals; Semifinals	Hampton; Delaware; James Madison	W 42–35; W 44–38; L 34–48
2009	First Round; Quarterfinals; Semifinals	Weber State; Southern Illinois; Villanova	W 38–0; W 24–3; L 13–14
2010	Second Round	Georgia Southern	L 15–31
2015	First Round; Second Round	Duquesne; Richmond	W 52–49; L 13–48
2022	Second Round; Quarterfinals	Gardner–Webb; Montana State	W 54–14; L 7–55

== Halls of Fame inductees ==
=== College Football ===
1. Jack Cloud – Set a school scoring record of 102 points in 1947 and once scored five touchdowns in a single game
2. Bill Fincher – Did not attend W&M, but coached the Indians in 1921
3. Lou Holtz – Did not attend W&M, but coached the Indians from 1969–1971 and led the team to the 1970 Tangerine Bowl
4. Bill Ingram – Did not attend W&M, but Ingram began his coaching career at William & Mary, where in 1922 he managed a 6–3 record
5. Buster Ramsey – In his four years (1939–1942) the school had a record of 29–7–3; the 1942 team were Southern Conference champions

=== National Football League (NFL) ===
1. Lou Creekmur – After playing for the Indians he went on to become of one of the most successful offensive tackles in Detroit Lions history
2. Marv Levy – Did not attend W&M, but coached William & Mary for five years (1964–1968), earning two Southern Conference Coach of the Year awards and one SoCon title (1966); the 27–16 win over Navy in 1967 is considered by the NCAA to be one of the top 10 greatest upsets in college football history

=== Canadian Football League (CFL) ===
1. Mike "Pinball" Clemons – compiled 4,778 all-purpose yards and was named a Division I-AA All-American
2. Ralph Sazio – was a mainstay of the Canadian Football League's Hamilton Tiger-Cats as a player, assistant coach, head coach, general manager and team president

== Future non-conference opponents ==
Announced schedules as of July 23, 2026.

2026	2027	2028	2029	2030	2031
Delaware State	at VMI	at Wisconsin	Towson	VMI	at VMI
at Duke	at Virginia		at Old Dominion	at Towson	
at North Carolina Central			at Delaware State	at Stanford	
