= Eastern Virginia Intercollegiate Athletic Association =

American college atheltics conference

- Formerly: Virginia Intercollegiate Athletic Association
- Founded: 1900
- Folded: 1921
- No. of teams: 10 (total)
- Region: Virginia

Locations

The Eastern Virginia Intercollegiate Athletic Association (originally known as the Virginia Intercollegiate Athletic Association) was founded in January 1900 by nine colleges in the state of Virginia. Originally, the association was divided into two divisions, the Eastern Conference and the Western Conference, however after most of the Western Division left the association the organization was referred to with increasing frequency as the Eastern Virginia Intercollegiate Athletic Association.

== History ==
Though a student-run organization known as the Virginia Intercollegiate Athletic Association was formed in Lynchburg, Virginia on February 22, 1895 between representatives from Randolph-Macon College, Richmond College, Roanoke College, Virginia Agricultural and Mechanical College, and William & Mary College, little information exists in the historical record regarding this organization.

The next time the Virginia Intercollegiate Athletic Association was mentioned was on January 27, 1900 after the University of Virginia's General Athletic Association sent out a circular to the state's leading colleges, asking for representatives to meet in an effort to help reduce the "discord" which had been growing in the state's athletic relations.

On January 29, almost every major college in Virginia sent representatives to Charlottesville to meet and discuss the creation of an organization. Members present were Randolph-Macon College, Richmond College, Hampden–Sydney College, Virginia Military Institute, Washington and Lee, Virginia Polytechnic Institute (formerly Virginia A&M), Roanoke College, and Virginia. The only major schools not represented were Emory and Henry College (who had previously agreed to send a representative to the meeting but later reneged) and William & Mary. Those present agreed on a constitution, elected officers, chose a formal name (the Virginia Intercollegiate Athletic Association), created scheduling requirements and a championship system, created rules for student eligibility and professionalism, and divided the teams into two conferences, the Eastern and the Western. The Eastern Conference was composed of Richmond, Randolph-Macon, Hampden-Sydney, and William and Mary, and the Western Conference of Virginia, Washington and Lee, VMI, VPI, and Roanoke.

Though Roanoke sent members to the opening meeting, no evidence exists supporting the fact that they competed in the conference athletically, and a report of the league in March failed to include Roanoke's name among a list of member teams. Aside from Roanoke's apparent departure, the league went on without significant issue until 1903, when Carpenter, of VPI, and Johnson, of Virginia, were ruled out of VIAA games. A similar issue took place in 1904, when Virginia player Barney Yancey was debarred from participating in VIAA games after it was discovered he had played for 4 years on the Kentucky University football team.

Interestingly, Virginia's primary rival, North Carolina, considered joining the Association at the start of the 1904 season as "it is very desirable that we should meet her on equal footing." Though the Tar Heels never actually joined the VIAA, the two teams adopted amenable rule sets nonetheless.

After increasing controversy, Virginia officially withdrew on February 8, 1905, after changes to the association's constitution. Though the debarring of players was a cause of annoyance, and there had been an addition to the constitution to include seasonal summer professional athletes as "professional" players (who were therefore banned from VIAA competition), the biggest cause of controversy was the changing of eligibility rules from just "four years" to "four academic years." In particular, Virginia cited the fact that many of her players came from "professional departments... who have pursued their academic studies at other colleges." While leaving, Virginia described the rules as "injurious to the association and to the University of Virginia," going on to add that when the rules of the institution did not create "mutual benefit" for all members, the institutions instead created "friction... ill will... and acrimonious discussions."

The association went through the 1905 season without further controversy, but issues again emerged before the start of the 1906 baseball season. During the yearly meetings, held in January 1906 two of the three remaining members of the Western Conference, Washington & Lee and VMI, chose to withdraw, citing "dissatisfaction with existing conditions of athletics in the western division." This left the Eastern Conference entirely intact, with the Western Conference consisting only of VPI. A second, more minor controversy of the 1905 football season was that no championship was awarded for either the Eastern or the Western Division since all the teams did not play each other, which was a requirement of the VIAA constitution which must be fulfilled in order to award a championship to each conference.

After this turnover, the VIAA continued on as it previously existed, gradually becoming referred to as the Eastern Virginia Intercollegiate Athletic Association with increasing frequency, save minor controversies involving Richmond in 1909 and 1913. In the former year, Richmond began threatening to withdrawal, but changes were made to appease the Spiders; in the latter, a controversial call in the William & Mary—Richmond game to determine the conference championship needed arbitration after a controversial call at the end of the game resulted in the assault of the ruling umpire.

Yet another controversy emerged before the 1914 season, after the association's rules changed to require each team to play member teams twice per season instead of once; Richmond once again threatened to withdraw, claiming that such a rule change would force the colleges to cease playing much-needed practice games against larger schools except for maybe one contest a year, and would also increase the number of games played a season to be "equal to those played in baseball and basketball." The requirement was later dropped.

Throughout this time, the members of the league remained wholly unchanged. Though VPI remained in the league for regular athletics, they ceased competing for football championships by 1906, never again facing all four of the association's other member teams; the Techs stopped competing in championships altogether by 1915. Despite the frequent rumblings of Richmond, among other institutions, membership remained the same from 1906 until February 1916. Though Roanoke College considered joining before the 1915 season, with talk of adding Emory and Henry College and a third college jointly to re-create the Western Division, only Roanoke was added after the close of the 1915—16 basketball season, though they appear to have not competed in football championships. By January 1920, Lynchburg College was added; Richmond withdrew by September of the same year. Richmond left the EVIAA because "the institution [felt it] was in a position to grow" and could do so best by leaving the association.

The addition of Lynchburg was short-lived; by October 1921, the EVIAA dissolved. The conference was effectively replaced the following season by the Virginia Conference.

== Members ==
School	City	Tenure	Current conference
Hampden–Sydney College	Hampden Sydney	1900–1921	Old Dominion Athletic Conference
Lynchburg College	Lynchburg	1919–1921	Old Dominion Athletic Conference
Randolph–Macon College	Ashland	1900–1921	Old Dominion Athletic Conference
Richmond College	Richmond	1900–1920	Atlantic 10 Conference (Note: non-football; member of the Coastal Athletic Association in football)
Roanoke College	Roanoke	1900; 1915–1918	Old Dominion Athletic Conference
University of Virginia	Charlottesville	1900–1905	Atlantic Coast Conference
Virginia Military Institute	Lexington	1900–1906	Southern Conference
Virginia Polytechnic Institute	Blacksburg	1900–1921 (Note: VPI became a non-championship member following 1906; member date extends to at least 1919 but is not presently confirmed past that point.)	Atlantic Coast Conference
Washington and Lee University	Lexington	1900–1906	Old Dominion Athletic Conference
College of William & Mary	Williamsburg	1900–1921	Coastal Athletic Association
