= Lynchburg Hornets =

Athletic teams representing the University of Lynchburg

- University: University of Lynchburg
- Nickname: Hornets
- NCAA: Division III
- Conference: Old Dominion Athletic Conference (primary); ECAC (equestrian)
- Athletic director: Jon Waters
- Location: Lynchburg, Virginia
- Varsity teams: 25
- Arena: Turner Gymnasium
- Baseball stadium: James C. Fox Field
- Softball stadium: Aubrey R. Moon Jr. Field
- Soccer field: Shellenberger Field
- Tennis venue: Lynchburg Tennis Courts
- Outdoor track and field venue: Dr. Jack M. Toms Track
- Colors: Hornet Red, White, and Gray
- Mascot: Dell
- Website: lynchburgsports.com
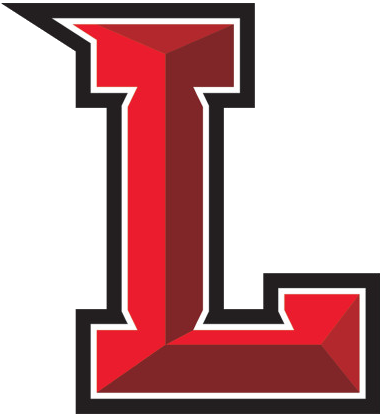

The Lynchburg Hornets refer to the various athletic teams that represent the University of Lynchburg, located in Lynchburg, Virginia. On July 1, 2018, the institution's name changed from Lynchburg College to the University of Lynchburg. Lynchburg's intercollegiate athletic programs compete primarily in NCAA Division III, with its equestrian teams competing in the Intercollegiate Horse Shows of America and National Collegiate Equestrian Association competition formats. The Lynchburg athletic department sponsors 24 varsity intercollegiate athletic programs.

The Hornets compete as a full member of the Old Dominion Athletic Conference (ODAC). Lynchburg was a founding member of the league in 1976. During that span of time, the Hornets have won 205 ODAC championships.

Roughly 500 student-athletes represent Lynchburg in competition, around 25% of the institution's student body.

== Varsity teams ==
Men's sports	Women's sports
Baseball	Basketball
Basketball	Beach volleyball
Cross country	Cross country
Equestrian	Equestrian
Golf	Field hockey
Lacrosse	Golf
Soccer	Lacrosse
Swimming	Soccer
Tennis	Softball
Track and field	Swimming
Volleyball	Tennis
Wrestling	Track and field
	Volleyball

== Championships ==
=== Conference titles ===
ODAC Championships unless otherwise noted

Sport	No. titles	Winning years
Baseball	12	1977, 1980, 1981, 1982, 1983, 1984, 1990, 2012, 2021, 2023, 2024, 2025
Basketball (m)	7	1935 (Chesapeake), 1951 (Little Six), 1965 (Dixie), 1966 (Dixie), 1967 (Dixie), 1979, 2016
Basketball (w)	2	2016, 2021
Cross Country (m)	21	1979, 1988, 1989, 1990, 1991, 1992, 1993, 1996, 1999, 2000, 2001, 2002, 2008, 2009, 2010, 2011, 2012, 2021, 2022, 2023, 2024
Cross Country (w)	9	1986, 1995, 1997, 1998, 2003, 2009, 2021, 2022, 2023
Equestrian	3	2023, 2024, 2025
Field Hockey	23	1982, 1983, 1984, 1986, 1988, 1989, 1990, 1994, 2001, 2006, 2007, 2008, 2009, 2010, 2011, 2012, 2013, 2014, 2018, 2019, 2020, 2023, 2025
Golf (m)	8	1979, 1982, 1984, 1985, 1987, 1989, 2024, 2025
Lacrosse (m)	10	2003, 2005, 2008, 2012, 2014, 2015, 2018, 2021, 2022, 2024
Lacrosse (w)	5	1983, 1984, 1985, 1986, 1989
Soccer (m)	32	1959 (Mason–Dixon), 1962 (Mason–Dixon), 1963 (Mason–Dixon), 1966 (Dixie), 1968 (Dixie), 1969 (Dixie), 1971 (Dixie), 1972 (Dixie), 1973 (Dixie), 1974 (Dixie), 1975 (Dixie), 1976, 1977, 1978, 1979, 1980, 1981, 1982, 1983, 1984, 1987, 2006, 2009, 2010, 2014, 2016, 2017, 2020, 2021, 2023, 2025, 2026
Soccer (w)	17	1997, 1999, 2000, 2001, 2004, 2005, 2007, 2008, 2010, 2011, 2012, 2013, 2014, 2015, 2017, 2018, 2022
Softball	6	1994, 1995, 1996, 2007, 2008, 2009
Swimming (w)	1	2021
Tennis (m)	4	1948 (Little Six), 1968 (Dixie), 1984, 1995
Track & Field (indoor, m)	33	1977, 1978, 1982, 1983, 1990, 1991, 1992, 1993, 1994, 1995, 1996, 1998, 1999, 2000, 2001, 2002, 2003, 2004, 2005, 2006, 2007, 2008, 2009, 2010, 2011, 2012, 2013, 2014, 2022, 2023, 2024, 2025, 2026
Track & Field (indoor, w)	14	1995, 1996, 1999, 2000, 2001, 2003, 2004, 2005, 2011, 2019, 2020, 2022, 2023, 2024
Track & Field (outdoor, m)	34	1977, 1982, 1983, 1985, 1986, 1990, 1991, 1992, 1993, 1994, 1995, 1996, 1998, 1999, 2000, 2001, 2002, 2003, 2004, 2005, 2006, 2007, 2009, 2010, 2011, 2012, 2013, 2014, 2021, 2022, 2023, 2024, 2025, 2026
Track & Field (outdoor, w)	14	1996, 1999, 2000, 2001, 2003, 2004, 2005, 2011, 2018, 2019, 2021, 2022, 2023, 2024

== National Tournament Appearances ==
=== Baseball ===
1977
South Regional

Division	Round	Opponent	Result
Division III	First Round	Glassboro State	L 2-4
Division III	Elimination Round 1	Methodist	W 2–0
Division III	Elimination Round 2	William Paterson	W 6–5
Division III	Elimination Finals	Salisbury State	W 5–2
Division III	Regional Finals	Glassboro State	L 6–11

1978
South Regional

Division	Round	Opponent	Result
Division III	First Round	Montclair State	W 5-4
Division III	Second Round	Upsala	W 2–1
Division III	Regional Semifinals	Salisbury State	W 16–4
Division III	Regional Finals	Glassboro State	L 4–5

1979
South Regional

Division	Round	Opponent	Result
Division III	First Round	Trenton State	L 1-2
Division III	Elimination Round 1	Stillman	W 6–1
Division III	Elimination Round 2	Upsala	L 1–2

1980
South Regional

Division	Round	Opponent	Result
Division III	First Round	Ramapo	L 9-10
Division III	Elimination Round 1	Glassboro State	W 5–3
Division III	Regional Semifinals	Upsala	L 4–5

1981
South Regional

Division	Round	Opponent	Result
Division III	First Round	William Paterson	W 3-0
Division III	Second Round	NC Wesleyan	L 3–4
Division III	Elimination Round	Salisbury State	W 2–1
Division III	Third Round	NC Wesleyan	W 7–3
Division III	Regional Finals	NC Wesleyan	L 2–3

1982
South Regional

Division	Round	Opponent	Result
Division III	First Round	Methodist	W 6-5
Division III	Regional Semifinals	NC Wesleyan	L 3–4
Division III	Elimination Finals	Salisbury State	L 4–6

1983
South Regional

Division	Round	Opponent	Result
Division III	First Round	Methodist	W 4-2
Division III	Second Round	NC Wesleyan	W 5–4
Division III	Regional Finals	NC Wesleyan	L 3–7

2008
South Regional

Division	Round	Opponent	Result
Division III	First Round	Piedmont	W 9-1
Division III	Second Round	Christopher Newport	W 12–1
Division III	Third Round	Salisbury	L 3–5
Division III	Elimination Finals	Johns Hopkins	L 5–7

2012
South Regional

Division	Round	Opponent	Result
Division III	First Round	Salisbury	L 2-7
Division III	Elimination Round 1	Christopher Newport	L 1–7

2021
High Point Regional

Division	Round	Opponent	Result
Division III	First Round	LaGrange	W 4-1
Division III	Second Round	Birmingham–Southern	W 6–3
Division III	Regional Semifinals	Salisbury	L 1–6
Division III	Elimination Finals	Birmingham–Southern	L 2–11

2022
Lynchburg Regional

Division	Round	Opponent	Result
Division III	First Round	Salve Regina	W 7-3
Division III	Second Round	Birmingham–Southern	L 2–10
Division III	Elimination Finals	Salve Regina	L 3–6

2023
Rocky Mount Regional

Division	Round	Opponent	Result
Division III	First Round	Lebanon Valley	W 2-1
Division III	Second Round	NC Wesleyan	W 16–9
Division III	Regional Finals – Game 1	Lebanon Valley	L 4–8
Division III	Regional Finals – Game 2	Lebanon Valley	W 5–3

Lynchburg Super Regional

Division	Round	Opponent	Result
Division III	Game 1	Shenandoah	W 9-6
Division III	Game 2	Shenandoah	W 3–1

Division III World Series
Cedar Rapids, Iowa

Division	Round	Opponent	Result
Division III	First Round	UW La Crosse	W 8-6
Division III	Second Round	East Texas Baptist	W 8–3
Division III	Semifinals	East Texas Baptist	W 7–1
Division III	Championship – Game 1	Johns Hopkins	W 5–2
Division III	Championship – Game 2	Johns Hopkins	L 6–11
Division III	Championship – Game 3	Johns Hopkins	W 7–6

2024
Cleveland Regional

Division	Round	Opponent	Result
Division III	First Round	Ithaca	W 3-1
Division III	Second Round	Case Western Reserve	W 5-0
Division III	Championship-Game 1	Case Western Reserve	W 6-5

La Verne Super Regional

Division	Round	Opponent	Result
Division III	Game 1	La Verne	W 7-1
Division III	Game 2	La Verne	W 6-4

Division III World Series
Eastlake, Ohio

Division	Round	Opponent	Result
Division III	First Round	Endicott	W 7-2
Division III	Second Round	Misericordia	W 6-2
Division III	Semifinals-Game 1	Misericordia	L 2-3
Division III	Semifinals-Game 2	Misericordia	L 1-5

2025
Lynchburg Regional

Division	Round	Opponent	Result
Division III	First Round	Marymount (VA)	W 7-6
Division III	Second Round	Emory	W 10-1
Division III	Championship-Game 1	Emory	W 6-5

Glassboro Super Regional

Division	Round	Opponent	Result
Division III	Game 1	Rowan	L 4-7
Division III	Game 2	Rowan	L 2-6

2026
Lynchburg Regional

Division	Round	Opponent	Result
Division III	First Round	Penn State-Behrend	W 9-1
Division III	Second Round	Maryville (TN)	W 18-1
Division III	Championship-Game 1	Christopher Newport	W 11-4

Lynchburg Super Regional

Division	Round	Opponent	Result
Division III	Game 1	East Texas Baptist	L 2-8
Division III	Game 2	East Texas Baptist	W 3-1
Division III	Game 3	East Texas Baptist	L 2-6

=== Men's Basketball ===
1976

Division	Round	Opponent	Result
Division III	First Round	Monmouth	L 73-97
Division III	Regional 3rd Place Game	Glassboro State	L 62–82

1979

Division	Round	Opponent	Result
Division III	First Round	Upsala	L 85-115
Division III	Regional 3rd Place Game	Virginia Wesleyan	L 84–108

2016

Division	Round	Opponent	Result
Division III	First Round	Scranton	W 82-55
Division III	Second Round	Ohio Wesleyan	L 94–97

=== Women's Basketball ===
2016

Division	Round	Opponent	Result
Division III	First Round	Birmingham-Southern	L 50-56

2017

Division	Round	Opponent	Result
Division III	First Round	Catholic	W 69-64
Division III	Second Round	Christopher Newport	L 51–69

=== Men's Cross Country ===
Appearances: 1979, 1982, 1990, 1991, 1992, 1993, 2009, 2010, 2011, 2012, 2021, 2022, 2023, 2024, 2025

=== Women's Cross Country ===
Appearances: 1998, 2021, 2022, 2023, 2024

=== Equestrian ===
Appearances: 2021, 2022, 2023, 2024, 2025

=== Field Hockey ===
1979

Division	Round	Opponent	Result
AIAW	First Round	Shippensburg	L 0-1
AIAW	Consolation Round 1	Bridgewater	W 2–1 (PS)
AIAW	Consolation Quarterfinals	Hollins	L 0–2

1980

Division	Round	Opponent	Result
AIAW	First Round	Kenyon	L 0-1 (PS)
AIAW	Consolation Round 1	Luther	W 3–1
AIAW	Consolation Quarterfinals	Denison	L 2–3 (OT)

1981

Division	Round	Opponent	Result
AIAW	First Round	Carleton	W 1-0
AIAW	Quarterfinals	Gettysburg	W 2–1 (PS)
AIAW	Semifinals	Wooster	W 1–0
AIAW	Championship	Bloomsburg	L 2–3

1983

Division	Round	Opponent	Result
Division III	First Round	Elizabethtown	L 0-2

1984

Division	Round	Opponent	Result
Division III	First Round	Trenton State	L 0-3

1988

Division	Round	Opponent	Result
Division III	First Round	Trenton State	L 0-5

1989

Division	Round	Opponent	Result
Division III	First Round	Trenton State	L 0-3

2001

Division	Round	Opponent	Result
Division III	Second Round	Salisbury	W 2-1 (PS)
Division III	Quarterfinals	TCNJ	L 0–1 (OT)

2002

Division	Round	Opponent	Result
Division III	Second Round	SUNY Cortland	L 2-5

2005

Division	Round	Opponent	Result
Division III	First Round	Alvernia	L 1-2

2006

Division	Round	Opponent	Result
Division III	First Round	Elizabethtown	L 0-1

2007

Division	Round	Opponent	Result
Division III	First Round	Centre	W 5-0
Division III	Second Round	Lebanon Valley	L 1–2

2008

Division	Round	Opponent	Result
Division III	First Round	Sewanee	W 4-0
Division III	Second Round	Ursinus	L 2–3

2009

Division	Round	Opponent	Result
Division III	First Round	Juniata	W 5-1
Division III	Second Round	Ursinus	L 0–4

2010

Division	Round	Opponent	Result
Division III	First Round	Christopher Newport	W 1-0
Division III	Second Round	Messiah	L 0–7

2011

Division	Round	Opponent	Result
Division III	Second Round	Catholic	W 2-0
Division III	Quarterfinals	TCNJ	L 0–3

2012

Division	Round	Opponent	Result
Division III	First Round	Catholic	W 4-3 (OT)
Division III	Second Round	Messiah	W 2–0
Division III	Quarterfinals	Mary Washington	L 2–3

2013

Division	Round	Opponent	Result
Division III	First Round	Centre	L 0-1

2014

Division	Round	Opponent	Result
Division III	First Round	Centre	L 1-2 (OT)

2018

Division	Round	Opponent	Result
Division III	First Round	Denison	W 3-1
Division III	Second Round	Rowan	L 0–1

2019

Division	Round	Opponent	Result
Division III	First Round	Centre	W 2-1
Division III	Second Round	Rowan	W 1–0
Division III	Quarterfinals	Salisbury	L 0–2

2021

Division	Round	Opponent	Result
Division III	First Round	Salisbury	L 2-3

2023

Division	Round	Opponent	Result
Division III	First Round	Keystone	W 6-1
Division III	Second Round	York (PA)	W 1–0 (2OT)
Division III	Quarterfinals	Kean	L 1–2

2024

Division	Round	Opponent	Result
Division III	First Round	Susquehanna	W 2-1 (OT)
Division III	Second Round	Salisbury	L 0-3

2025

Division	Round	Opponent	Result
Division III	First Round	Rowan	W 3-2
Division III	Second Round	Christopher Newport	L 1-2

=== Men's Golf ===
Appearances: 1979, 1982, 1984, 1985, 1987, 1989

=== Men's Lacrosse ===
1999

Division	Round	Opponent	Result
Division III	Second Round	Hampden-Sydney	L 9-17

2003

Division	Round	Opponent	Result
Division III	Second Round	Franklin & Marshall	L 12-13 (OT)

2005

Division	Round	Opponent	Result
Division III	Second Round	Denison	W 9-6
Division III	Quarterfinals	Roanoke	L 9–10

2006

Division	Round	Opponent	Result
Division III	Second Round	Washington (MD)	L 7-8

2008

Division	Round	Opponent	Result
Division III	Second Round	Washington (MD)	L 9-12

2012

Division	Round	Opponent	Result
Division III	Second Round	Denison	L 5-10

2013

Division	Round	Opponent	Result
Division III	First Round	St. Mary's (MD)	W 6-5
Division III	Second Round	Roanoke	W 12–9
Division III	Quarterfinals	Stevenson	L 7–13

2014

Division	Round	Opponent	Result
Division III	First Round	Sewanee	W 25-4
Division III	Second Round	Washington (MD)	L 7–10

2015

Division	Round	Opponent	Result
Division III	First Round	Sewanee	W 13-4
Division III	Second Round	Aurora	W 19–8
Division III	Quarterfinals	Salisbury	W 13–11
Division III	Semifinals	Gettysburg	W 11–9
Division III	Championship	Tufts	L 11–19

2016

Division	Round	Opponent	Result
Division III	First Round	Gettysburg	L 7-8

2017

Division	Round	Opponent	Result
Division III	Second Round	Sewanee	W 14-12
Division III	Third Round	York (PA)	W 10–8
Division III	Quarterfinals	Denison	L 9–18

2018

Division	Round	Opponent	Result
Division III	Second Round	Dickinson	L 12-16

2019

Division	Round	Opponent	Result
Division III	Second Round	Transylvania	W 15-5
Division III	Third Round	Salisbury	L 10–18

2021

Division	Round	Opponent	Result
Division III	First Round	Pfeiffer	W 26-11
Division III	Second Round	Stevens	W 14–8
Division III	Quarterfinals	Christopher Newport	L 11–12

2022

Division	Round	Opponent	Result
Division III	Second Round	Western New England	L 10-14

2023

Division	Round	Opponent	Result
Division III	Second Round	St. John Fisher	W 11-10 (OT)
Division III	Third Round	Denison	W 14–8
Division III	Quarterfinals	Tufts	L 9–17

2024

Division	Round	Opponent	Result
Division III	Second Round	Pfeiffer	W 24-8
Division III	Third Round	Washington & Lee	L 13-16

2025

Division	Round	Opponent	Result
Division III	Second Round	Stevenson	W 15-6
Division III	Third Round	Christopher Newport	L 10-22

2026

Division	Round	Opponent	Result
Division III	Second Round	Grove City	W 16-15
Division III	Third Round	York (PA)	L 12-18

=== Women's Lacrosse ===
1982

Division	Round	Opponent	Result
AIAW	Semifinals	Wheaton (MA)	W 7-6
AIAW	Championship Game	Millersville State	L 3–10

1985

Division	Round	Opponent	Result
Division III	First Round	Denison	W 6-5
Division III	Semifinals	Ursinus	L 2–15

1986

Division	Round	Opponent	Result
Division III	First Round	Denison	W 7-5
Division III	Semifinals	Trenton State	L 3–8

=== Men's Soccer ===
1974

Division	Round	Opponent	Result
Division III	First Round	Swarthmore	L 1-2

1975

Division	Round	Opponent	Result
Division III	First Round	Elizabethotwn	L 1-2

1976

Division	Round	Opponent	Result
Division III	First Round	Grove City	L 0-2

1978

Division	Round	Opponent	Result
Division III	First Round	Lock Haven	L 0-2

1979

Division	Round	Opponent	Result
Division III	First Round	Lock Haven	L 0-3

1980

Division	Round	Opponent	Result
Division III	Second Round	Glassboro State	L 0-1

1982

Division	Round	Opponent	Result
Division III	First Round	UNC Greensboro	L 0-3

2006

Division	Round	Opponent	Result
Division III	First Round	NC Wesleyan	L 0-1 (OT)

2009

Division	Round	Opponent	Result
Division III	First Round	Catholic	W 3-0
Division III	Second Round	Christopher Newport	T 1–1 (Lost on PK)

2010

Division	Round	Opponent	Result
Division III	First Round	Transylvania	W 3-1
Division III	Second Round	Emory	W 2–1
Division III	Third Round	Trinity (TX)	W 2–0
Division III	Quarterfinals	Ohio Wesleyan	W 2–0
Division III	Semifinals	Bowdoin	W 2–1
Division III	Championship	Messiah	L 1–2

2014

Division	Round	Opponent	Result
Division III	First Round	Christopher Newport	L 0-1

2016

Division	Round	Opponent	Result
Division III	First Round	John Carroll	W 4-2
Division III	Second Round	Kenyon	L 1–2 (OT)

2017

Division	Round	Opponent	Result
Division III	First Round	Penn St.-Abington	W 3-0
Division III	Second Round	Emory	L 0–1

2021

Division	Round	Opponent	Result
Division III	First Round	Hanover	L 1-2

2022

Division	Round	Opponent	Result
Division III	First Round	Catholic	L 0-2

2023

Division	Round	Opponent	Result
Division III	First Round	Ohio Northern	T 2-2 (Lost on PK)

2024

Division	Round	Opponent	Result
Division III	First Round	Emory	W 3-0
Division III	Second Round	Dickinson	L 0-2

2025

Division	Round	Opponent	Result
Division III	First Round	Transylvania	W 4-0
Division III	Second Round	Christopher Newport	W 2-1
Division III	Third Round	Dickinson	L 0-1

2026

Division	Round	Opponent	Result
Division III	First Round	Covenant	W 2-1
Division III	Second Round	Ohio Northern	T 0-0 (Advances on PK)
Division III	Third Round	Carnegie Mellon	L 0-1

=== Women's Soccer ===
1997

Division	Round	Opponent	Result
Division III	First Round	NC Wesleyan	L 0-3

1998

Division	Round	Opponent	Result
Division III	First Round	NC Wesleyan	W 1-0 (3OT)
Division III	Second Round	Mary Washington	L 2–3

1999

Division	Round	Opponent	Result
Division III	Second Round	NC Wesleyan	L 0-1

2000

Division	Round	Opponent	Result
Division III	First Round	Arcadia	W 9-0
Division III	Second Round	Salisbury	L 1–2 (2OT)

2001

Division	Round	Opponent	Result
Division III	Second Round	NC Wesleyan	T 2-2 (2OT) (Advances on PK)
Division III	Third Round	Hardin–Simmons	W 2–0
Division III	Quarterfinals	Willamette	L 0–2

2004

Division	Round	Opponent	Result
Division III	Second Round	Emory	W 1-0 (OT)
Division III	Third Round	Christopher Newport	L 0–1

2005

Division	Round	Opponent	Result
Division III	First Round	Catholic	W 3-1
Division III	Second Round	Virginia Wesleyan	W 1–0
Division III	Third Round	Trinity (TX)	L 0–1

2007

Division	Round	Opponent	Result
Division III	First Round	Maryville (TN)	W 1-0
Division III	Second Round	Roanoke	W 1–0
Division III	Third Round	Emory	W 2–1 (2OT)
Division III	Quarterfinals	TCNJ	L 0–1

2008

Division	Round	Opponent	Result
Division III	First Round	Maryville (TN)	W 3-0
Division III	Second Round	Emory	W 1–0
Division III	Third Round	Ithaca	L 0–2

2009

Division	Round	Opponent	Result
Division III	First Round	Catholic	W 5-1
Division III	Second Round	Washington & Lee	W 2–0
Division III	Third Round	Concordia–Moorhead	W 4–0
Division III	Quarterfinals	Trinity (TX)	T 1–1 (2OT) (Advances on PK)
Division III	Semifinals	Washington St. Louis	T 1–1 (2OT) (Lost on PK)

2010

Division	Round	Opponent	Result
Division III	First Round	Transylvania	W 1-0
Division III	Second Round	Emory	L 0–1 (2OT)

2011

Division	Round	Opponent	Result
Division III	First Round	SUNY New Paltz	T 0-0 (2OT) (Lost on PK)

2012

Division	Round	Opponent	Result
Division III	First Round	Frostburg State	W 1-0
Division III	Second Round	Montclair State	W 2–0
Division III	Third Round	Johns Hopkins	L 1–3

2013

Division	Round	Opponent	Result
Division III	First Round	Centre	W 3-2
Division III	Second Round	Emory	L 1–2

2014

Division	Round	Opponent	Result
Division III	First Round	Salem (NC)	W 4-0
Division III	Second Round	Stevenson	W 4–1
Division III	Third Round	Montclair State	W 2–0
Division III	Quarterfinals	Messiah	T 1–1 (2OT) (Advances on PK)
Division III	Semifinals	Illinois Wesleyan	W 2–1
Division III	Championship	Williams	T 0–0 (2OT) (Wins on PK)

2015

Division	Round	Opponent	Result
Division III	First Round	Babson	W 1-0
Division III	Second Round	Rowan	L 0–1

2016

Division	Round	Opponent	Result
Division III	First Round	Hope	W 3-2
Division III	Second Round	Thomas More	L 0–1

2017

Division	Round	Opponent	Result
Division III	First Round	McDaniel	W 1-0
Division III	Second Round	Christopher Newport	W 2–1
Division III	Third Round	TCNJ	L 0–5

2018

Division	Round	Opponent	Result
Division III	First Round	Piedmont	W 2-1
Division III	Second Round	Emory	W 2–0
Division III	Third Round	Messiah	T 2–2 (2OT) (Advances on PK)
Division III	Quarterfinals	Christopher Newport	L 0–1

2021

Division	Round	Opponent	Result
Division III	First Round	Middlebury	L 2-3

2022

Division	Round	Opponent	Result
Division III	First Round	Montclair State	L 0-1

2026

Division	Round	Opponent	Result
Division III	First Round	Stevens	W 5-0
Division III	Second Round	Carnegie Mellon	W 2-1 (2OT)
Division III	Third Round	UChicago	L 2-3 (2OT)

=== Softball ===
2007
Fayetteville Regional

Division	Round	Opponent	Result
Division III	First Round	Marietta	W 12-1 (6 inn.)
Division III	Second Round	Christopher Newport	W 6–3
Division III	Semifinals	Emory	L 0–2
Division III	Elimination Finals	Salisbury	W 6–2
Division III	Championship – Game 1	Emory	L 1–9 (5 inn.)

2008
Fayetteville Regional

Division	Round	Opponent	Result
Division III	First Round	LaGrange	W 4-0
Division III	Semifinals	Neumann	W 4–2
Division III	Championship – Game 1	Ursinus	L 1–3
Division III	Championship – Game 2	Ursinus	W 2–0

Division III World Series

Division	Round	Opponent	Result
Division III	First Round	Muskingum	L 0-1
Division III	Elimination Round	Ithaca	L 0–4

2009
Salisbury Regional

Division	Round	Opponent	Result
Division III	Second Round	Bridgewater (VA)	L 1-2
Division III	Elimination Round	Christopher Newport	W 1–0
Division III	Elimination Finals	Bridgewater (VA)	L 2–4

2013
Salem Regional

Division	Round	Opponent	Result
Division III	First Round	Piedmont	L 1-4
Division III	Elimination Round	Neumann	L 5–6

2014
Atlanta Regional

Division	Round	Opponent	Result
Division III	First Round	Piedmont	L 4-6
Division III	Elimination Round	Agnes Scott	W 6–1
Division III	Elimination Finals	Piedmont	L 0–2

2018
Atlanta Regional

Division	Round	Opponent	Result
Division III	First Round	Berry	L 1-9 (5 inn.)
Division III	Elimination Round	Emory	L 2–4

2019
Virginia Beach Regional

Division	Round	Opponent	Result
Division III	First Round	Manhattanville	W 6-5
Division III	Second Round	Virginia Wesleyan	L 0–1
Division III	Elimination Finals	Manhattanville	W 4–1
Division III	Championship – Game 1	Virginia Wesleyan	W 7–4
Division III	Championship – Game 2	Virginia Wesleyan	W 4–2

Lynchburg Super Regional

Division	Round	Opponent	Result
Division III	Game 1	Emory	W 7-2
Division III	Game 2	Emory	L 5–9
Division III	Game 3	Emory	L 8–10

=== Men's Tennis ===
Appearances: 1968 (NCAA College Division)

=== Women's Volleyball ===
AIAW Appearances: 1981

2025

Division	Round	Opponent	Result
Division III	First Round	William Smith	L 2-3

2026

Division	Round	Opponent	Result
Division III	First Round	Emory	L 1-3

== National Champions ==
=== Team ===
Sport	Division	Year	Opponent/Runner-up	Result
Baseball	Division III	2023	Johns Hopkins	7–6
Equestrian	NCEA	2022	Sweet Briar	5–3
Equestrian	NCEA	2023	Sweet Briar	4–4 (Won tiebreaker 1,957-1,900)
Equestrian	NCEA	2024	Sweet Briar	6–3
Equestrian	NCEA	2026	College of Charleston	6–3
Women's Soccer	Division III	2014	Williams	0–0 (4-3 PK)
