= USA South Athletic Conference =

Intercollegiate athletic conference in the southeastern US

- Formerly: Dixie Intercollegiate Athletic Conference; Dixie Conference
- Association: NCAA
- Founded: 1963; 63 years ago
- Commissioner: Dr. Tom Hart
- Sports fielded: 18; men's: 9; women's: 9
- Division: Division III
- No. of teams: 10
- Headquarters: Rome, Georgia
- Region: South
- Website: usasouth.net

Locations
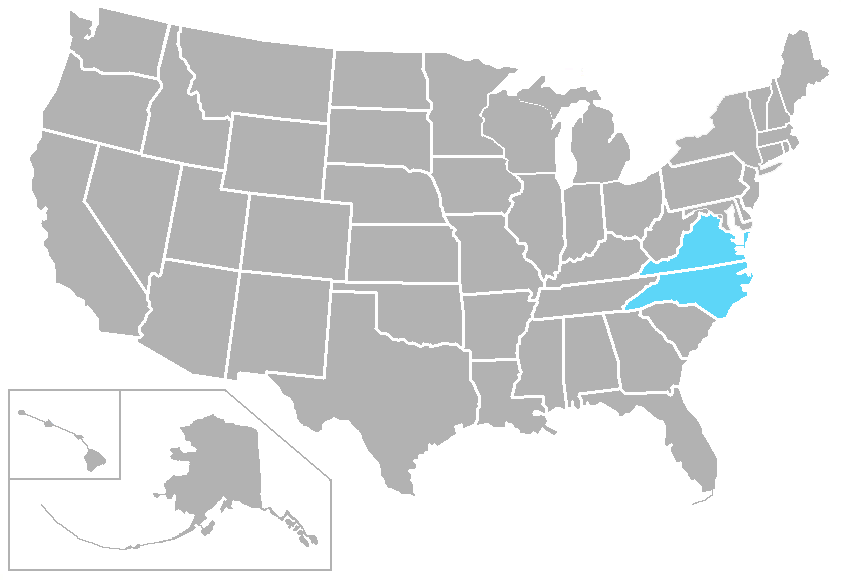

The USA South Athletic Conference (formerly the Dixie Intercollegiate Athletic Conference or the Dixie Conference) is an intercollegiate athletic conference which competes in the NCAA's Division III. Member schools are located in North Carolina and Virginia.

== History ==
The Dixie Intercollegiate Athletic Conference was founded in 1963 as a member of the National Association of Intercollegiate Athletics (NAIA) with the philosophy that participation would be strictly amateur, so no athletic financial aid or scholarships would be awarded by its affiliate institutions. The six charter members were Charlotte College, College of Charleston, Methodist College, North Carolina Wesleyan College, St. Andrews Presbyterian College, and Lynchburg College. In 1973, when the National Collegiate Athletic Association divided into a three-division format, the Dixie Conference left the NAIA and moved into the non-scholarship NCAA Division III.

On June 30, 2003, the conference changed to its name to the USA South Athletic Conference.

During the 2010–11 school year, changes to the membership of the USA South were announced. Three colleges announced plans to join the USA South Conference beginning in the 2012–13 season while one departed the league. Piedmont College, LaGrange College, and Maryville College joined from the Great South Athletic Conference on July 1, 2012.

Shenandoah University left the USA South on the above date, to become a full member of the Old Dominion Athletic Conference (ODAC), a league in which it held associate membership in several sports.

Christopher Newport University left the USA South after the 2012–13 season to join the Capital Athletic Conference in all sports except for football which remained a USA South affiliate member through the 2015 season.

On May 10, 2012, Covenant College and Huntingdon College announced plans to leave the Great South and join USA South Athletic Conference beginning in the 2013–14 season.

On May 6, 2015, the USA South announced that Agnes Scott College, Salem College, and Wesleyan College would leave the Great South Athletic Conference and join the USA South beginning in the 2016–17 school year. The conference announced the future arrival of three more schools during the 2015–16 school year. First, it announced on December 9, 2015, that Brevard College, transitioning from the NCAA Division II South Atlantic Conference to Division III, would join for 2017–18 and beyond. Then, on May 4, 2016, two more incoming members were announced: Berea College, nearing completion of a transition from the NAIA to Division III, and Pfeiffer University, transitioning from the Division II Conference Carolinas to Division III. Both joined in 2017–18 as well.

On June 27, 2017, Ferrum College, a conference member since 1988, announced that it would leave for the Old Dominion Athletic Conference after the 2017–18 school year.

On December 11, 2019, the USA South announced the addition of Southern Virginia University who joined in the 2021–22 academic year.

Later changes to the USA South membership came on March 8, 2021, when Averett University revealed its intention to leave the USA South and join Ferrum College in the ODAC as a full member in the 2022–23 academic year, and on November 22, when Belhaven University, then a member of the American Southwest Conference, was at first accepted for membership in the conference also for 2022–23.

On February 18, 2022, the USA South Conference presidents announced a restructuring of the conference, resulting in all of its members outside North Carolina and Virginia—Agnes Scott, Berea, Covenant, Huntingdon, LaGrange, Maryville, Piedmont, and Wesleyan—leaving the USA South to form the new Collegiate Conference of the South (CCS) for the 2022-23 academic year. They were joined by incoming member Belhaven. CCS members sponsoring football, men's lacrosse, women's lacrosse, and women's golf remain in the USA South as associate members for those sports.

USA South Athletic Conference
Location of USA South members:
Current Members
Associate Members

=== Chronological timeline ===
- 1963 – The USA South was founded as the Dixie Intercollegiate Athletic Conference. It was a member of the National Association of Intercollegiate Athletics (NAIA). Charter members included Charlotte College (now the University of North Carolina at Charlotte), the College of Charleston (CoC), Lynchburg College (now the University of Lynchburg), Methodist College (now Methodist University), North Carolina Wesleyan College (now North Carolina Wesleyan University), and St. Andrews Presbyterian College (now St. Andrews University), beginning the 1963–64 academic year.
- 1966 – Greensboro College joined the Dixie Conference in the 1966–67 academic year.
- 1968 – The University of North Carolina at Greensboro joined the Dixie Conference in the 1968–69 academic year.
- 1970:
  - UNC Charlotte and the College of Charleston left the Dixie Conference after the 1969–70 academic year.
  - Virginia Wesleyan College (now Virginia Wesleyan University) joined the Dixie Conference in the 1970–71 academic year.
- 1972 – Christopher Newport College (now Christopher Newport University) joined the Dixie Conference in the 1972–73 academic year.
- 1973 – The Dixie Conference left the NAIA to join the Division III ranks of the National Collegiate Athletic Association (NCAA), beginning the 1973–74 academic year.
- 1976 – Lynchburg left the Dixie Conference to join the Old Dominion Athletic Conference (ODAC) after the 1975–76 academic year.
- 1978 – Averett College (now Averett University) joined the Dixie Conference in the 1978–79 academic year.
- 1988:
  - UNC Greensboro and St. Andrews Presbyterian left the Dixie Conference after the 1987–88 academic year.
  - Ferrum College joined the Dixie Conference in the 1988–89 academic year.
- 1989 – Virginia Wesleyan left the Dixie Conference to join the ODAC after the 1988–89 academic year.
- 1992 – Shenandoah College (now Shenandoah University) joined the Dixie Conference in the 1992–93 academic year.
- 2000 – Chowan College (now Chowan University) joined the Dixie Conference in the 2000–01 academic year.
- 2003:
  - Peace College (now William Peace University) joined the Dixie Conference in the 2003–04 academic year.
  - The Dixie Conference was rebranded as the USA South Athletic Conference (USA South), beginning the 2003–04 academic year.
- 2004 – Chowan left the USA South to join the NCAA Division II ranks as an NCAA D-II Independent (which it would eventually join the Central Intercollegiate Athletic Association (CIAA) in 2009–10) after the 2003–04 academic year.
- 2005 – Maryville College joined the USA South as an associate member for football in the 2005 fall season (2005–06 academic year).
- 2007 – Mary Baldwin College (now Mary Baldwin University) and Meredith College joined the USA South in the 2007–08 academic year.
- 2009 – Agnes Scott College and LaGrange College joined the USA South as associate members for women's lacrosse in the 2010 spring season (2009–10 academic year).
- 2012:
  - Shenandoah left the USA South to join the ODAC after the 2011–12 academic year.
  - Piedmont College joined the USA South (with LaGrange and Maryville adding the rest of their sports for full member status) in the 2012–13 academic year.
- 2013:
  - Christopher Newport left the USA South to join the Capital Athletic Conference (CAC) after the 2012–13 academic year; while it remained as an associate member for football, beginning the 2013 fall season (2013–14 school year).
  - Covenant College and Huntingdon College joined the USA South in the 2013–14 academic year.
- 2014 – Agnes Scott left the USA South as an associate member for women's lacrosse after the 2014 spring season (2013–14 academic year).
- 2016:
  - Christopher Newport left the USA South as an associate member for football after the 2015 fall season (2015–16 academic year).
  - Salem College and Wesleyan College joined the USA South (with Agnes Scott rejoining, but for all sports) in the 2016–17 academic year.
- 2017 – Berea College, Brevard College and Pfeiffer University joined the USA South in the 2017–18 academic year.
- 2018 – Ferrum left the USA South to join the ODAC after the 2017–18 academic year.
- 2021 – Southern Virginia University joined the USA South in the 2021–22 academic year.
- 2022:
  - In an amicable conference split, Agnes Scott, Berea, Covenant, Huntingdon, LaGrange, Maryville, Piedmont and Wesleyan left the USA South at the end of the 2021–22 academic year to form the new Collegiate Conference of the South (CCS). With the CCS not sponsoring football, women's golf, or men's or women's lacrosse, all CCS members that sponsored those sports remained in the USA South as associate members.
  - At the same time, Averett left the USA South to join the ODAC.
  - Also at that time, Belhaven University joined the USA South as an associate member for football. Belhaven was initially slated to join for all sports, but was admitted to the CCS as a full member instead. The three other CCS members that sponsor football (Huntingdon, LaGrange, and Maryville) became USA South football associates. Huntingdon and non-football Piedmont also became associates in women's golf and men's and women's lacrosse; LaGrange also became an associate in men's lacrosse; and Maryville became an associate in women's golf.
- 2025 – Maryville left the USA South as an associate member for football and women's golf after the 2024–25 academic year.

== Member schools ==
=== Current members ===
The USA South currently has 10 full members, all private schools, with Meredith as the league's only secular institution.

Institution	Location	Founded	Affiliation	Enrollment	Nickname	Colors	Joined (Note: Represents the calendar year when fall sports competition begins.)	Football?
Brevard College	Brevard, North Carolina	1853	United Methodist	708	Tornados		2017	Yes
Greensboro College	Greensboro, North Carolina	1838	United Methodist	1,233	Pride		1966	Yes
Mary Baldwin University (Note: This institution is a former women's college, which has eventually turned into a co-educational college (William Peace since 2012–13, Mary Baldwin since 2017–18).)	Staunton, Virginia	1842	Presbyterian (PCUSA)	2,242	Fighting Squirrels		2007	No
Meredith College (Note: This institution is a women's college, therefore it does not compete in men's sports.)	Raleigh, North Carolina	1891	Nonsectarian	1,990	Avenging Angels		2007	No
Methodist University	Fayetteville, North Carolina	1956	United Methodist	2,215	Monarchs		1963	Yes
North Carolina Wesleyan University	Rocky Mount, North Carolina	1956	United Methodist	900	Battling Bishops		1963	Yes
Pfeiffer University	Misenheimer, North Carolina	1885	United Methodist	1,200	Falcons		2017	No
Salem College	Winston-Salem, North Carolina	1772	Moravian	565	Spirits		2016	No
Southern Virginia University	Buena Vista, Virginia	1867	LDS Church	1,053	Knights		2021	Yes
William Peace University	Raleigh, North Carolina	1857	Presbyterian (PCUSA)	950	Pacers		2003	No

=== Associate members ===
The USA South has four associate members, all private and faith-based schools that are full CCS members. All became charter CCS members in the 2022 conference split. Belhaven had been originally announced as an incoming USA South member for 2022, but instead opted to join the CCS for that school year.

Institution	Location	Founded	Affiliation	Enrollment	Nickname	Joined (Note: Represents the calendar year when fall sports competition begins.)	USA South sport(s)
Belhaven University	Jackson, Mississippi	1883	Presbyterian (PCUSA)	3,245	Blazers	2022	Football
Huntingdon College	Montgomery, Alabama	1854	United Methodist	900	Hawks	2022	Football
Huntingdon College	Montgomery, Alabama	1854	United Methodist	900	Hawks	2022	Men's lacrosse
Huntingdon College	Montgomery, Alabama	1854	United Methodist	900	Hawks	2022	Women's golf
Huntingdon College	Montgomery, Alabama	1854	United Methodist	900	Hawks	2022	Women's lacrosse
LaGrange College	LaGrange, Georgia	1831	United Methodist	1,137	Panthers	2022	Football
LaGrange College	LaGrange, Georgia	1831	United Methodist	1,137	Panthers	2022	Men's lacrosse
LaGrange College	LaGrange, Georgia	1831	United Methodist	1,137	Panthers	2024	Women's golf
Piedmont University	Demorest, Georgia	1897	U.C.C. & Congregationalist	2,640	Lions	2022	Men's lacrosse
Piedmont University	Demorest, Georgia	1897	U.C.C. & Congregationalist	2,640	Lions	2022	Women's golf
Piedmont University	Demorest, Georgia	1897	U.C.C. & Congregationalist	2,640	Lions	2022	Women's lacrosse

=== Former members ===
The USA South has twenty former full members, all but four were private schools:

Institution	Location	Founded	Affiliation	Enrollment	Nickname	Joined (Note: Represents the calendar year when fall sports competition begins.)	Colors	Left (Note: Represents the calendar year when spring sports competition ends.)	Current conference
Agnes Scott College	Decatur, Georgia	1889	Presbyterian (PCUSA)	914	Scotties	2016		2022	C.C. South (CCS)
Averett University	Danville, Virginia	1859	Baptist	2,719	Cougars	1978		2022	Old Dominion (ODAC)
Berea College	Berea, Kentucky	1855	Christian (unaffiliated)	1,613	Mountaineers	2017		2022	Heartland (HCAC)
Chowan College (Note: Currently known as Chowan University since 2006.)	Murfreesboro, North Carolina	1848	Baptist	1,260	Hawks	2000		2004	Carolinas (CC) (Note: Currently an NCAA Division II athletic conference.)
Christopher Newport University	Newport News, Virginia	1960	Public	4,793	Captains	1972		2013	Coast to Coast (C2C)
College of Charleston	Charleston, South Carolina	1770	Public	11,320	Cougars	1963		1970	Coastal (CAA) (Note: Currently an NCAA Division I athletic conference.)
Covenant College	Lookout Mountain, Georgia	1955	Presbyterian (PCA)	1,282	Scots & Lady Scots	2013		2022	C.C. South (CCS)
Ferrum College	Ferrum, Virginia	1913	United Methodist	1,100	Panthers	1988		2018	Carolinas (CC)
Huntingdon College	Montgomery, Alabama	1854	United Methodist	900	Hawks	2013		2022	C.C. South (CCS)
LaGrange College	LaGrange, Georgia	1831	United Methodist	1,137	Panthers	2012		2022	C.C. South (CCS)
Lynchburg College (Note: Currently known as the University of Lynchburg since 2018.)	Lynchburg, Virginia	1903	Disciples of Christ	2,500	Fighting Hornets	1963		1976	Old Dominion (ODAC)
Maryville College	Maryville, Tennessee	1819	Presbyterian (PCUSA)	1,103	Scots	2012		2022	C.C. South (CCS)
Piedmont University	Demorest, Georgia	1897	U.C.C. & Congregationalist	2,640	Lions	2012		2022	C.C. South (CCS)
Shenandoah University	Winchester, Virginia	1875	United Methodist	1,767	Hornets	1992		2012	Old Dominion (ODAC)
St. Andrews Presbyterian University (Note: Known as St. Andrews University from 2011 to 2025.)	Laurinburg, North Carolina	1958	Presbyterian (PCUSA)	600	Knights	1963		1988	Closed in 2025
University of North Carolina at Charlotte	Charlotte, North Carolina	1961	Public	25,227	49ers	1963		1970	American
University of North Carolina at Greensboro	Greensboro, North Carolina	1891	Public	18,502	Spartans	1968		1988	Southern (SoCon)
Virginia Wesleyan College (Note: Currently known as Virginia Wesleyan University since 2017.)	Norfolk, Virginia	1961	United Methodist	1,446	Marlins	1970		1989	Old Dominion (ODAC)
Wesleyan College	Macon, Georgia	1836	United Methodist	550	Wolves	2016		2022	C.C. South (CCS)

=== Former associate members ===
The USA South has one former associate member, a private school:

Institution	Location	Founded	Affiliation	Enrollment	Nickname	Joined (Note: Represents the calendar year when fall sports competition begins.)	Left (Note: Represents the calendar year when spring sports competition ends.)	USA South sport(s)
Maryville College	Maryville, Tennessee	1819	Presbyterian (PCUSA)	1,103	Scots	2022	2025	Football
Maryville College	Maryville, Tennessee	1819	Presbyterian (PCUSA)	1,103	Scots	2022	2025	Women's golf

=== Membership timeline ===
Full member (all sports) Full member (non-football) Associate member (football) Associate member (sport)

== Sports ==
The conference sponsors championships in the following sports:

Conference sports
Sport	Men's	Women's
Baseball	8	
Basketball	8	10
Cross country	7	8
Football	8	
Golf	5	7
Lacrosse	9	8
Soccer	8	10
Softball		9
Tennis	8	10
Track and field (outdoor)	7	8
Volleyball		10

=== Men's sponsored sports by school ===
Departing members are displayed in red.

School	Baseball	Basketball	Cross country	Football	Golf	Lacrosse	Soccer	Tennis	Track & field (outdoor)	Total USA South sports
Brevard	✓	✓	✓	✓	✗	✓	✓	✓	✓	8
Greensboro	✓	✓	✗	✓	✓	✓	✓	✓	✗	7
Mary Baldwin	✓	✓	✓	✗	✗	✗	✓	✓	✓	6
Methodist	✓	✓	✓	✓	✓	✓	✓	✓	✓	9
North Carolina Wesleyan	✓	✓	✓	✓	✓	✗	✓	✓	✓	8
Pfeiffer	✓	✓	✓	✗	✓	✓	✓	✓	✓	8
Southern Virginia	✓	✓	✓	✓	✓	✓	✓	✓	✓	9
William Peace	✓	✓	✓	✗	✗	✓	✓	✓	✓	7
Totals	8	8	7	5+3	5	6+3	8	8	7	63+6
Affiliate members
Belhaven				✓						1
Huntingdon				✓		✓				2
LaGrange				✓		✓				2
Piedmont						✓				1

=== Women's sponsored sports by school ===
Departing members are displayed in red.

School	Basketball	Cross country	Golf	Lacrosse	Soccer	Softball	Tennis	Track & field (outdoor)	Volleyball	Total USA South sports
Brevard	✓	✓	✗	✓	✓	✓	✓	✓	✓	8
Greensboro	✓	✗	✗	✗	✓	✓	✓	✗	✓	5
Mary Baldwin	✓	✓	✗	✗	✓	✓	✓	✓	✓	7
Meredith	✓	✓	✓	✓	✓	✓	✓	✓	✓	9
Methodist	✓	✓	✓	✓	✓	✓	✓	✓	✓	9
North Carolina Wesleyan	✓	✓	✗	✓	✓	✓	✓	✓	✓	8
Pfeiffer	✓	✓	✓	✓	✓	✓	✓	✓	✓	9
Salem	✓	✗	✗	✗	✓	✗	✓	✗	✓	4
Southern Virginia	✓	✓	✓	✓	✓	✓	✓	✓	✓	9
William Peace	✓	✓	✗	✗	✓	✓	✓	✓	✓	7
Totals	10	8	4+3	6+2	10	9	10	8	10	75+5
Affiliate Members
Huntingdon			✓	✓						2
Maryville			✓							1
Piedmont			✓	✓						2

== Conference facilities ==
School	Football		Basketball	
School	Stadium	Capacity	Arena	Capacity
Belhaven	Belhaven Bowl	1,200	Football-only school	—
Brevard	Brevard Memorial Stadium	5,000	Boshamer Gymnasium	1,000
Greensboro	Jamieson Stadium	10,000	Hanes Gymnasium	850
Huntingdon	Charles Lee Field at Samford Stadium	2,500	Football-only school	—
LaGrange	Callaway Stadium	5,000	Football-only school	—
Maryville	Lloyd L. Thornton Stadium	3,000	Football-only school	—
Mary Baldwin	Non-football school	—	MBU Physical Activities Center	—
Meredith	Non-football school	—	Weatherspoon Gymnasium	500
Methodist	Monarch Stadium	1,500	March F. Riddle Center	1,200
North Carolina Wesleyan	Rocky Mount Athletic Stadium	5,000	Everett Gymnasium	800
Pfeiffer	Non-football school	—	Merner Gymnasium	1,500
Salem	Non-football school	—	Spirit Center	—
Southern Virginia	Knight Stadium	1,000	Knight Arena	525
William Peace	Non-football school	—	Hermann Center	1,000
