= Collegiate Conference of the South =

Intercollegiate athletic conference in the southeastern US

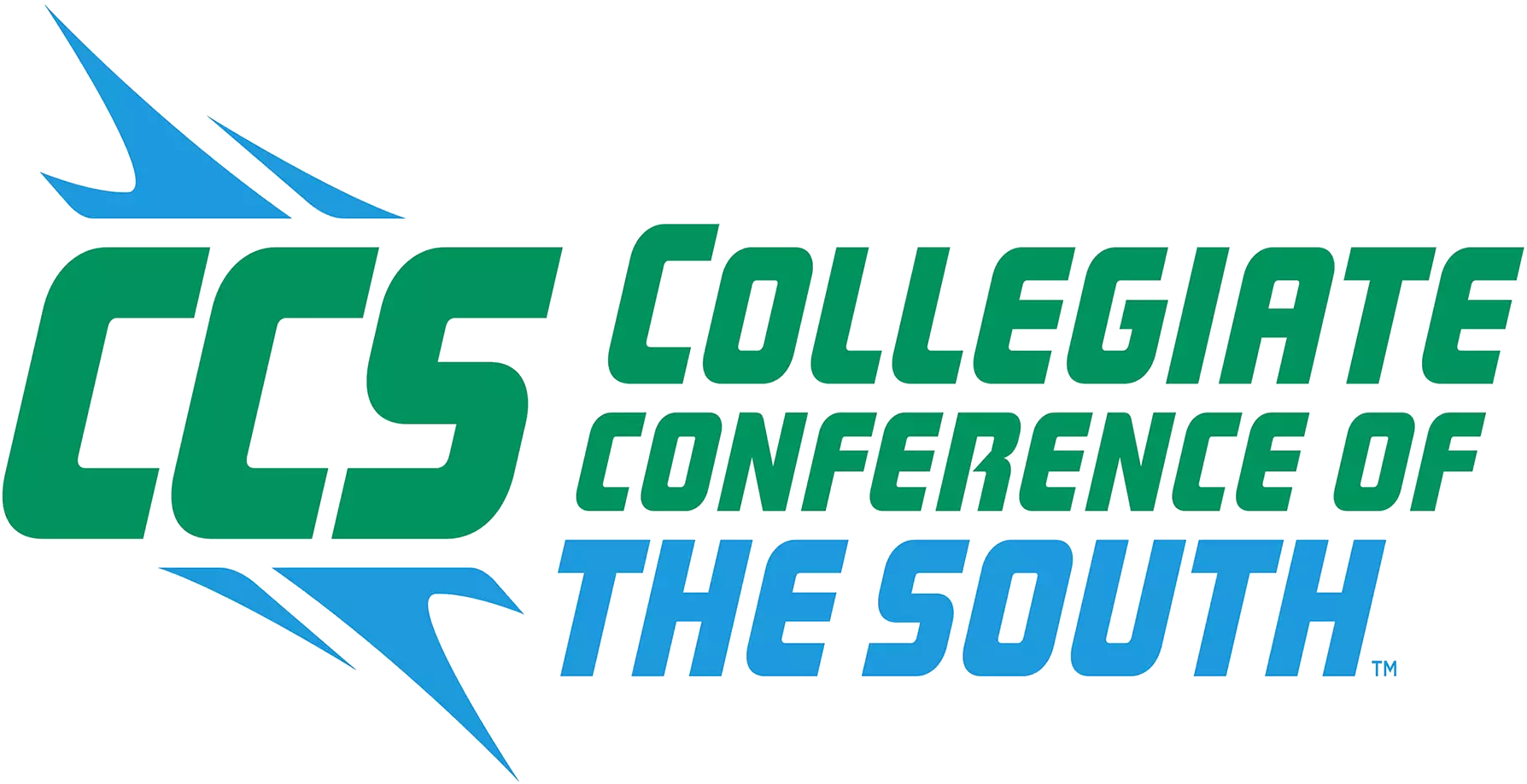
- Association: NCAA
- Founded: 2022; 4 years ago
- Commissioner: Beth Vansant
- Sports fielded: 14; men's: 7; women's: 7
- Division: Division III
- No. of teams: 7 (8 in 2027)
- Region: South
- Website: collegiateconfsouth.com

Locations
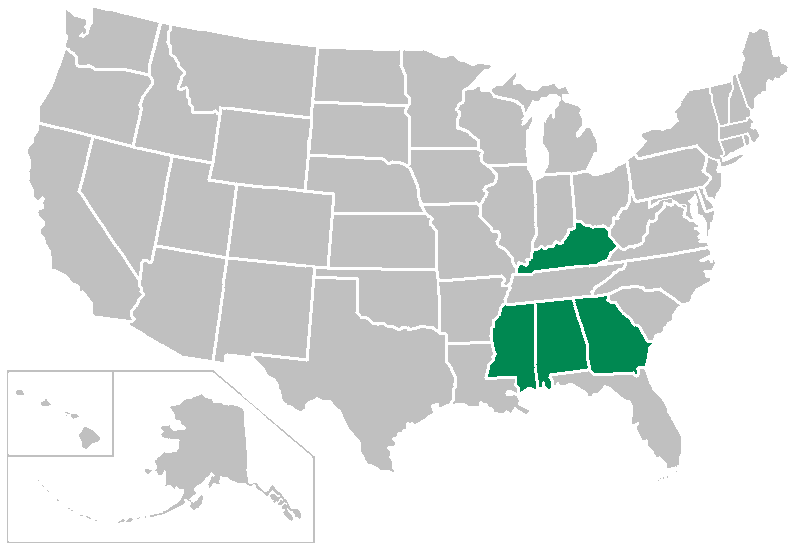

Collegiate Conference of the South
Location of CCS members:
Current Members
Future Members

The Collegiate Conference of the South (CCS) is a college athletic conference affiliated with the Division III ranks of the National Collegiate Athletic Association (NCAA). Member schools are located in Alabama, Georgia, Kentucky and Mississippi.

While competitive CCS play began immediately during the 2022–23 school year, the CCS was not eligible for automatic NCAA Division III tournament bids until 2024–25. The conference sponsors 14 championship sports. Football, women's golf, and men's and women's lacrosse teams sponsored by CCS members continue to compete in the USA South as associate members.

== History ==
=== First changes ===
On June 1, 2023, Berea announced that it accepted an invitation to the Heartland Collegiate Athletic Conference (HCAC) as a full member, thus leaving the CCS, and join there, beginning the 2024–25 school year.

On October 6, 2023, Asbury University was accepted as a full member of the CCS, thus replacing Berea's spot, to join there beginning during the 2024–25 school year.

On July 17, 2024, Maryville announced that it will leave the CCS to accept an invitation to the Southern Athletic Association (SAA) as a full member, and will join there, beginning the 2026–27 school year.

=== Chronological timeline ===
- 2022: The Collegiate Conference of the South was founded and established after a decision to split the 19-member USA South Athletic Conference (USA South) into two smaller, geographically oriented leagues. Charter members included Agnes Scott College, Belhaven University, Berea College, Covenant College, Huntingdon College, LaGrange College, Maryville College, Piedmont University and Wesleyan College, beginning the 2022–23 academic year.
- 2024:
  - Berea left the CCS to join the Heartland Collegiate Athletic Conference (HCAC) after the 2023–24 academic year.
  - Asbury University joined the CCS in the 2024–25 academic year.
- 2026:
  - Maryville (TN) left the CCS to join the Southern Athletic Association (SAA) after the 2025–26 academic year.
  - Wesleyan left the CCS and the NCAA to begin a transition to the National Association of Intercollegiate Athletics (NAIA) and the Southern States Athletic Conference (SSAC) after the 2025–26 academic year.
- 2027: Maryville will rejoin the CCS in the 2027–28 academic year.

== Member schools ==
=== Current members ===
The CCS began with nine full members, all private and faith-based schools. The only members not tied to one or more specific Christian denominations are current member Asbury and former member Berea, although Asbury is historically associated with the Methodist movement.

Institution	Location	Founded	Affiliation	Enrollment	Nickname	Colors	Joined (Note: Represents the calendar year when fall sports competition begins.)	Football?
Agnes Scott College (Note: This institution is a women's college, therefore it does not compete in men's sports.)	Decatur, Georgia	1889	Presbyterian (PCUSA)	914	Scotties		2022	No
Asbury University	Wilmore, Kentucky	1890	Christian (unaffiliated)	1,054	Eagles		2024	No
Belhaven University	Jackson, Mississippi	1883	Presbyterian (PCUSA)	3,245	Blazers		2022	Yes
Covenant College	Lookout Mountain, Georgia	1955	Presbyterian (PCA)	1,282	Scots & Lady Scots		2022	No
Huntingdon College	Montgomery, Alabama	1854	United; Methodist	900	Hawks		2022	Yes
LaGrange College	LaGrange, Georgia	1831	United; Methodist	1,137	Panthers		2022	Yes
Piedmont University	Demorest, Georgia	1897	United Church of Christ & Congregationalist	2,640	Lions		2022	No

=== Future members ===
Institution	Location	Founded	Affiliation	Enrollment	Nickname	Colors	Joining (Note: Represents the calendar year when fall sports competition begins.)	Football?
Maryville College	Maryville, Tennessee	1819	Presbyterian (PCUSA)	1,103	Scots		2027 (Note: Maryville was previously a full CCS member from 2022 to 2026.)	Yes

=== Former members ===
The CCS has three former full members, all were private schools:

Institution	Location	Founded	Affiliation	Enrollment	Nickname	Joined (Note: Represents the calendar year when fall sports competition begins.)	Left (Note: Represents the calendar year when spring sports competition ends.)	Current conference
Berea College	Berea, Kentucky	1855	Christian (unaffiliated)	1,613	Mountaineers	2022	2024	Heartland (HCAC)
Maryville College	Maryville, Tennessee	1819	Presbyterian (PCUSA)	1,103	Scots	2022	2026	Southern (SAA)
Wesleyan College (Note: This institution is a women's college, therefore it does not compete in men's sports.)	Macon, Georgia	1836	United; Methodist	550	Wolves	2022	2026	Southern States (SSAC) (Note: Currently an NAIA conference.)

=== Membership timeline ===
Full member (all sports) Full member (non-football) Associate member (football) Associate member (sport)

== Sports ==
The CCS sponsors championships in the following sports:

Conference sports
Sport	Men's	Women's
Baseball	✓	
Basketball	✓	✓
Cross country	✓	✓
Golf	✓	
Soccer	✓	✓
Softball		✓
Tennis	✓	✓
Track and field (outdoor)	✓	✓
Volleyball		✓

=== Men's sponsored sports by school ===
School	Baseball	Basketball	Cross Country	Golf	Soccer	Tennis	Track & field (outdoor)	Total CCS sports
Asbury	✓	✓	✓	✓	✓	✓	✓	7
Belhaven	✓	✓	✓	✓	✓	✓	✓	7
Covenant	✓	✓	✓	✓	✓	✓	✓	7
Huntingdon	✓	✓	✓	✓	✓	✓	✓	7
LaGrange	✓	✓	✓	✓	✓	✓	✓	7
Piedmont	✓	✓	✓	✓	✓	✓	✓	7
Totals	6	6	6	6	6	6	6	42

==== Men's varsity sports not sponsored by the CCS that are played by CCS schools ====
School	Cycling	Football	Lacrosse	Swimming	Wrestling
Asbury				SCAC	
Belhaven		USA South			
Huntingdon		USA South	USA South		IND
LaGrange		USA South	USA South		
Piedmont	✓		USA South	IND	

=== Women's sponsored sports by school ===
School	Basketball	Cross Country	Soccer	Softball	Tennis	Track & field (outdoor)	Volleyball	Total CCS sports
Agnes Scott	✓	✓	✓	✓	✓	✓	✓	7
Asbury	✓	✓	✓	✓	✓	✓	✓	7
Belhaven	✓	✓	✓	✓	✓	✓	✓	7
Covenant	✓	✓	✓	✓	✓	✓	✓	7
Huntingdon	✓	✓	✓	✓	✓	✓	✓	7
LaGrange	✓	✓	✓	✓	✓	✓	✓	7
Piedmont	✓	✓	✓	✓	✓	✓	✓	7
Totals	7	7	7	7	7	7	7	49

==== Women's varsity sports not sponsored by the CCS that are played by CCS schools ====
School	Beach Volleyball	Cycling	Flag Football	Golf	Lacrosse	Swimming	Wrestling
Asbury						SCAC	
Huntingdon	IND		IND	USA South	USA South		IND
LaGrange	IND		IND	USA South			
Piedmont		✓		USA South	USA South	IND	

== Conference facilities ==
All CCS members with football teams play that sport in the USA South.

School	Football		Basketball	
School	Stadium	Capacity	Arena	Capacity
Agnes Scott	Non-football school	—	Woodruff Athletic Complex	—
Asbury	Non-football school	—	Luce Center Gym	1,500
Belhaven	Belhaven Bowl	1,200	Charles R. Rugg Arena	500
Covenant	Non-football school	—	Barnes Physical Education Center	650
Huntingdon	Charles Lee Field at Samford Stadium	2,500	Catherine Dixon Roland Arena	976
LaGrange	Callaway Stadium	5,000	Mariotti Gymnasium	500
Piedmont	Non-football school	—	Johnny Mize Athletic Center and Cave Arena	1,500

== See also ==
- USA South Athletic Conference
- Great South Athletic Conference – former Division III conference with similar membership and geographic footprint
