= Methodist Monarchs =

- University: Methodist University
- Conference: USA South
- NCAA: Division III
- Location: Fayetteville, North Carolina
- Football stadium: Monarch Stadium
- Basketball arena: March F. Riddle Center
- Baseball stadium: Armstrong-Shelley Field
- Soccer stadium: Duggins Soccer Stadium
- Tennis venue: Gene Clayton Tennis Center
- Colors: Green and gold
- Website: mumonarchs.com
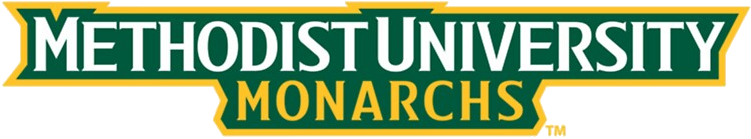

Team NCAA championships
- 31

The Methodist Monarchs are the athletic teams that represent Methodist University, located in Fayetteville, North Carolina, in NCAA Division III intercollegiate sports.

The Monarchs compete as members of the USA South Athletic Conference (USA South) for all sports.

== Conference affiliations ==
- Dixie Intercollegiate Athletic Conference (1963–2003)
- USA South Athletic Conference (2003–present)

== Varsity teams ==
Men's sports	Women's sports
Baseball	Basketball
Basketball	Cross country
Cross country	Golf
Football	Lacrosse
Golf	Soccer
Lacrosse	Softball
Soccer	Tennis
Tennis	Track and field
Track and field	Volleyball

== Individual programs ==
=== Baseball ===
The baseball team is managed by Tom Austin, currently sixth overall among all-time NCAA Division III head coaches and fourth among active Division III head coaches in victories. Tom Austin has been the coach of Methodist University's baseball team since 1980 and is one of 64 college baseball coaches ever to reach a thousand career wins. The Monarch baseball team has reached the NCAA National Tournament 22 times and the Division III College World Series six times, finishing fifth or better each time, including national runners-up in 1995.

=== Golf ===
Golf is one of the most popular sports at Methodist. The women's golf team has won 26 national titles, winning every national title from 1986 to 2012 except 1990 and 1997, when they finished as the national runner-up both years. They later won again in 2021. The men's team also has 14 NCAA Division III national golf championships (1990–1992, 1994–1999, 2010, 2015, 2018, 2022, 2024) and were runners-up three times (1984, 1989, 2000).
