= Belhaven Blazers =

- University: Belhaven University
- Conference: CCS (primary); USA South (football)
- NCAA: Division III
- Athletic director: Scott Little
- Location: Jackson, Mississippi
- Varsity teams: 15 (8 men's, 7 women's)
- Football stadium: Belhaven Bowl Stadium
- Basketball arena: Rugg Arena
- Baseball stadium: Trustmark Park
- Softball stadium: McLeod Field
- Soccer stadium: Belhaven Bowl Stadium
- Outdoor track and field venue: Belhaven Track & Field Complex
- Nickname: Blazers
- Colors: Green and yellow
- Website: blazers.belhaven.edu
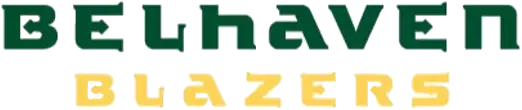

The Belhaven Blazers are the athletic teams that represent Belhaven University, located in Jackson, Mississippi.

== History ==
The Blazers compete in intercollegiate sports as a member of the NCAA Division III ranks, primarily competing in the Collegiate Conference of the South (CCS) for most of its sports as a founding member since the 2022–23 academic year; while its football team competes in the USA South Athletic Conference (USA South). They were also a member of the National Christian College Athletic Association (NCCAA), primarily competing as an independent in the Mid-East Region of the Division I level.

The Blazers previously competed in the D-III American Southwest Conference (ASC) from 2015–16 to 2021–22; in the Southern States Athletic Conference (SSAC; formerly known as Georgia–Alabama–Carolina Conference (GACC) until after the 2003–04 school year) of the National Association of Intercollegiate Athletics (NAIA) from 2010–11 to 2014–15; and in the HBCU Athletic Conference (HBCUAC; formerly known as Gulf Coast Athletic Conference (GCAC) until after the 2023–24 school year) from 2002–03 to 2009–10 (which they were a member on a previous stint from 1981–82 to 1999–2000).

The school adopted the "Blazers" nickname in August 1981. The school's sports teams had previously been known as the "Klansmen", a name in use as late as 1976.

== Conference affiliations ==
NAIA

- Gulf Coast Athletic Conference (1981–2000, 2002–2010)
- Independent (2000–2002)
- Southern States Athletic Conference (2010–2015)

NCAA

- American Southwest Conference (2015–2022)
- Collegiate Conference of the South (all sports except football; 2022–present)
- USA South Athletic Conference (football only; 2022–present)

== Varsity teams ==
Belhaven competes in 15 intercollegiate varsity sports: Men's sports include baseball, basketball, cross country, football, golf, soccer, tennis and track & field; while women's sports include basketball, cross country, soccer, softball, tennis, track & field and volleyball.

== National championships ==
=== Team ===
Sport	Association	Division	Year	Runner-up	Score
Men's soccer (2)	NAIA	Single	1992	Lynn	2–1
Men's soccer (2)	NAIA	Single	2012	Mobile	2–0
Men's tennis (1)	NAIA	Single	1983	Lander	33–32

== Baseball ==
Belhaven has had eight Major League Baseball draft selections since the draft began in 1965.

Blazers in the Major League Baseball Draft
Year	Player	Round	Team	Highest level
1966	Dallas Jones	28	Yankees	Double-A
1970	Thomas Robbins	9	Yankees	Single-A
1980	Nelson Hayman	20	Angels	none
1995	Paco Cardona	49	Cardinals	Low-A
2009	Craig Westcott	30	Giants	Double-A
2009	Chanse Cooper	21	Royals	Rookie
2010	Wade Broyles	40	Rays	Low-A
2013	Kyle Wheeler	26	Athletics	Low-A

Several undrafted Belhaven players have also played professional baseball.

Undrafted Blazers in Professional Baseball
Year	Player	Team	Highest level
2000	Jay Hall	Ind.	n/a
2012	Brett Blaise	Rays	Rookie
2015	Reagan Rutledge	Ind.	n/a
2016	Ben Allison	Ind.	n/a

== Softball ==
The Belhaven Softball team has consistently been a powerhouse program. The team has been led by Kevin Griffin since 2011, and as of the end of the 2024 season his record with the Blazers is 449-207 (.684). Griffin has been assisted since 2014 by former Blazer Courtney Fairley, who is also the Belhaven Athletic Department's Senior Woman Administrator (SWA).

In 2024 the Blazers' Softball Team finished as the NCAA Division 3 National Runners-Up at the Women's College World Series. The 2024 campaign will go down as one of the best in Belhaven Softball history. The Blazers' 47 wins mark the most in a single season since the 2011 season. Belhaven also made its first-ever NCAA Division III Women's College World Series appearance. The Blazers earned their fourth straight NCAA Regional bid and reached their third consecutive Super Regional.

The Blazers' first became NCAA postseason eligible in 2020, but due to the Covid 19 pandemic, the season was cancelled while the team was competing in the Spring Games in Clermont, FL. So the 2021 season became their first year eligible for postseason competition.

=== 2021 ===
- Record: 31-12
- ASC Regular Season Co-Champions
- Decatur, IL Regional

=== 2022 ===
- Record: 41-8
- ASC Regular Season & Tournament Champions
- Marshall, TX Regional hosted by East Texas Baptist University
- Seguin, TX Super Regional hosted by Texas Lutheran University

=== 2023 ===
- Record: 32-13
- Inaugural CCS Regular Season & Tournament Champions
- Marshall, TX Regional hosted by East Texas Baptist University
- Mount Berry, GA Super Regional hosted by Berry College

=== 2024 ===
- Record: 47-10
- CCS Regular Season Co-Champions & Tournament Runners-Up
- St. Louis, MO Regional hosted by Washington University in St. Louis
- Mount Berry, GA Super Regional hosted by Berry College
- NCAA Division III Women's College World Series hosted by East Texas Baptist University
- NCAA Division III National Runners-Up
