= Berea Mountaineers =

- University: Berea College
- Conference: Heartland Collegiate Athletic Conference
- Division: Division III
- Athletic director: Ryan Hess
- Location: Berea, Kentucky
- Varsity teams: 14 (7 men's, 7 women's)
- Arena: Seabury Center
- Baseball stadium: Berea College Athletic Complex
- Nickname: Mountaineers
- Colors: Berea Blue and white
- Website: bereaathletics.com

The Berea Mountaineers are composed of 14 teams representing Berea College in intercollegiate athletics, including men and women's basketball, cross country, soccer, tennis, and track and field. Men's sports include baseball and golf. Women's sports include softball and volleyball. The Mountaineers compete in the NCAA Division III and are members of the Collegiate Conference of the South for all sports. Berea will leave the Collegiate Conference of the South in the fall of 2024 to join the Heartland Collegiate Athletic Conference.

== Teams ==
Men's sports	Women's sports
Baseball	Basketball
Basketball	Cross country
Cross country	Soccer
Golf	Softball
Soccer	Tennis
Tennis	Track and field
Track and field	Volleyball

=== Men's basketball ===
On February 4, 1954, Irvine Shanks was in the lineup for Berea against Ohio Wilmington, breaking the color barrier in college basketball in the state of Kentucky.
