= March F. Riddle Center =

Multi-purpose arena in Fayetteville, North Carolina

Coordinates: 35.1342211°N 78.8766503°W

The March F. Riddle Center is a multi-purpose arena on the campus of Methodist University in Fayetteville, North Carolina. The arena was built in 1990. With a capacity of 1,300 people, it is home to the Methodist Monarchs college basketball and volleyball teams in the NCAA Division III USA South Athletic Conference. It was also home to the Carolina Cougarz of the Continental Basketball League for their only year in the league.
