= LaGrange College =

Methodist college in LaGrange, Georgia, US

- Former names: LaGrange Female Academy (1831–1847); LaGrange Female Institute (1847–1851); LaGrange Female College (1851–1934)
- Type: Private college
- Established: December 26, 1831; 194 years ago
- Religious affiliation: United Methodist Church
- Endowment: $50.2 million (2020)
- President: Susanna Baxter
- Students: 930
- Location: LaGrange, Georgia, United States; 33°02′22″N 85°02′33″W
- Campus: Suburban
- Colors: Red and black
- Sporting affiliations: NCAA Division III
- Mascot: Panthers
- Website: lagrange.edu

LaGrange College is a private college in LaGrange, Georgia. Founded in 1831 as a female educational institution, LaGrange is the oldest private college in Georgia. It is affiliated with the United Methodist Church and offers more than 55 academic and pre-professional programs, including graduate degrees in education, clinical mental health counseling and higher education administration.

== History ==
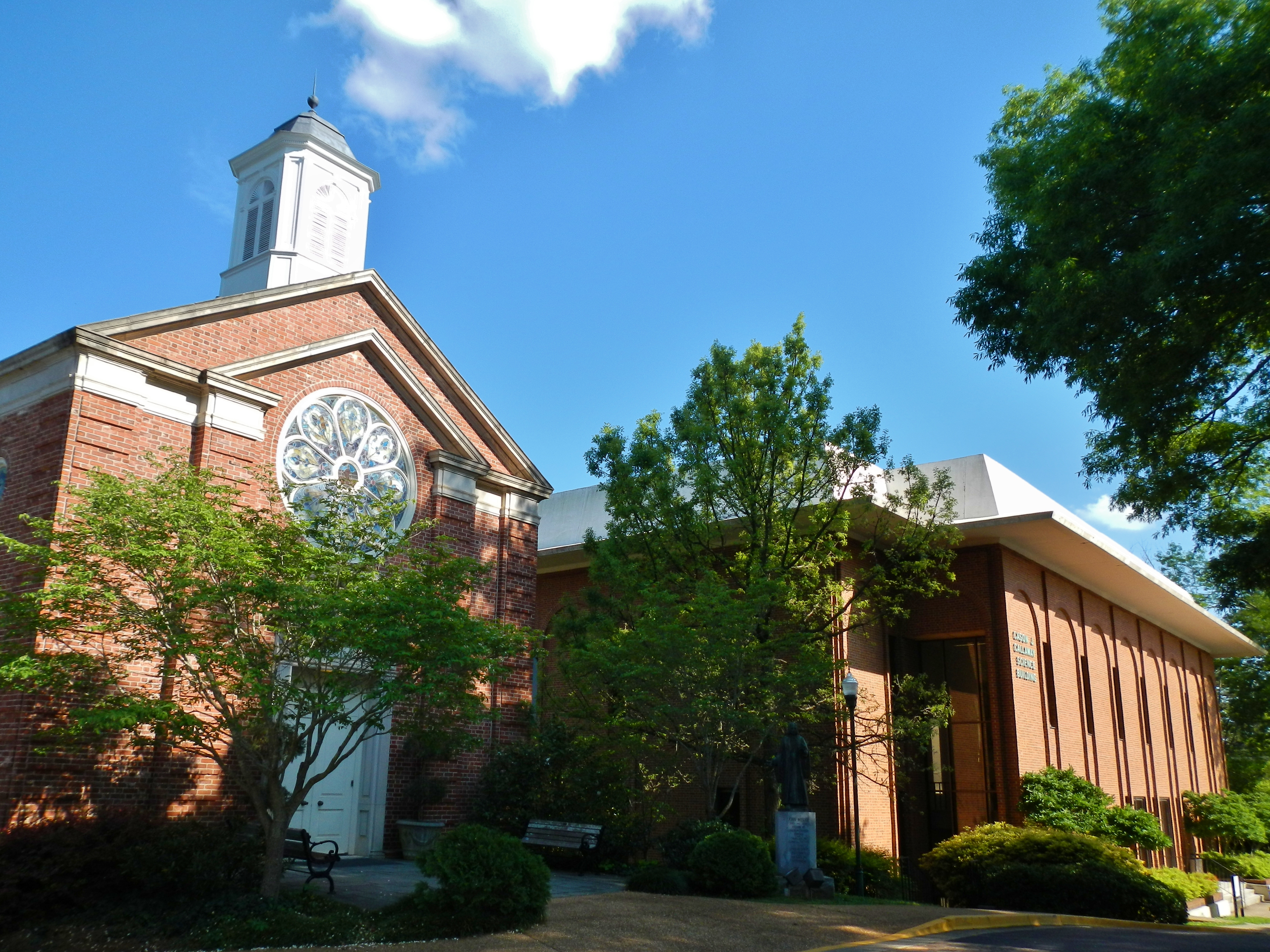
The chapel (left) and the Cason J. Callaway Science Building (right).

The college began as a women's academy, housed in a large white building down the street from where the current campus was developed. A few years later, in 1851, the institution moved to its present location on "the Hill," the highest geographical point in the city of LaGrange.

In 1847, the school was renamed as LaGrange Female Institute, and the charter was amended to allow the school the power to confer degrees. The name was changed to LaGrange Female College in 1851, with the adoption of a four-year curriculum.

The Georgia Conference of the Methodist Episcopal Church South took ownership of the college in 1856. Today, it is an institution of the North Georgia Conference of the United Methodist Church.

As discussions continued about admitting men, LaGrange Female College became "LaGrange College" in 1934. In 1953, the institution's Board of Trustees officially made it coeducational.

The size of the campus doubled in 1992 thanks to the donation of land and facilities from the Callaway Foundation, Inc., which included Callaway Auditorium, Callaway Education Building, six tennis courts, two softball fields, sites for Cleaveland Baseball Field and the soccer field.

== Academics ==
Academic rankings

Liberal arts
- U.S. News & World Report: 173–229
- Washington Monthly: 184

LaGrange operates on the modified (4-1-4) semester system for day classes, which provides for fall and spring semesters.

The college offers more than 50 academic and pre-professional programs. Students may earn an Associate of Arts, Associate of Science, Bachelor of Arts, Bachelor of Science, Bachelor of Music, Bachelor of Business Administration and a Bachelor of Science in Nursing. The graduate programs students can pursue are the Master of Arts degree in Teaching, the Master of Education degree in Curriculum and Instruction, the Specialist in Education degree in Curriculum and Instruction, the Doctoral degree (Ed.D.) in Curriculum and Instruction, Tier I Leadership Certification in Education, the Master of Science in Clinical Mental Health Counseling, the Master of Science in Computer Science and the Master of Education in Higher Education Administration.

=== Aviation Program ===
Open to all disciplines and majors across campus, the aviation minor allows students to obtain the skills needed to earn their commercial pilot certificate. An on-campus flight-simulator lets them get started immediately and begin flying a Piper 100i aircraft their freshman year. The planes and instruction are provided by the college’s partner, Paragon Flight Training, an award-winning flight academy based in Fort Myers, Florida. The program has been offered since fall of 2023.

=== Manufacturing Engineering Technology Program ===
Begun in fall 2025, the new bachelor’s degree in manufacturing engineering technology will focus on engineering roles outside of research. The Bureau of Labor Statistics forecasts that there will be 12% more new jobs by 2032.

=== Servant Scholars Program ===
Begun in the fall of 2012, the Servant Scholars Program is exclusively for juniors and seniors who have demonstrated high academic achievement, engagement, and leadership on campus. The program is housed in the newly renovated Broad Street Apartments, a local landmark built in 1936 and located halfway between the campus and downtown LaGrange. Among the only apartments in the city at the time, they filled a vital housing gap and provided a first home for many families.

After falling into disrepair, the apartments were purchased by Callaway Foundation, Inc., in December 2009. The foundation funded their renovation, and the work was completed by Batson-Cook Co. of West Point. The property was turned over to the college in the spring of 2012.

=== Global Engagement ===
The Study-Away program offers students international learning opportunities through semester or academic year long programs or short-term, faculty-led study away courses which are offered during May in the Maymester term.

=== Accreditation ===
LaGrange College is accredited by the Commission on Colleges of the Southern Association of Colleges and Schools. It is also approved by the United Methodist University Senate.

LaGrange College's teacher education (undergraduate and graduate) programs are approved by the Georgia Professional Standards Commission to recommend candidates for certification in the areas of early childhood, middle grades or secondary education. The Bachelor of Science in Nursing program is accredited by the National League for Nursing Accrediting Commission. The undergraduate programs in business administration, business management, and accounting are accredited by the Accreditation Council for Business Schools and Programs (ACBSP).

== Athletics ==
LaGrange Panthers wordmark

LaGrange College is a member of NCAA Division III and the Collegiate Conference of the South (CCS), formed in July 2022 by an amicable split of the previously 19-member USA South Athletic Conference. The college's nickname is Panthers and its colors are red and black. Intercollegiate teams compete in women's soccer, basketball, cross country, volleyball, softball, swimming, lacrosse, and tennis; and men's baseball, football, lacrosse, basketball, cross country, golf, soccer, swimming, and tennis. The CCS does not sponsor football or women's lacrosse; under the terms of the conference split, all CCS members that sponsor those sports, including LaGrange, are USA South associate members in those sports.

Under NCAA guidelines, no athletic scholarships are offered at Division III schools.

The Panthers football program was launched in 2006, and women's lacrosse was added in 2010. The school also has a host of intramural activities. LaGrange athletic facilities include a $2 million baseball stadium, a natatorium, and a softball complex.

In 2008, the Panthers football team rewrote NCAA Division III history when it went from its first two seasons of 20 straight losses to a 9–1 conference championship and a trip to the national playoffs, a turnaround record that stands to this day.

In 2014 & 2016 the Men's Lagrange College Basketball team won the Conference Championship.

The LaGrange College Softball team won the Conference Championship from 2007 to 2009.

The 2003 Baseball and Men's Golf teams won the USCAA National Championships. The 2003 baseball team set a school record for most wins in a season (36) and fewest losses (10).

== Alumni ==
Notable alumni include Dean W. Young (1960), nationally syndicated cartoonist of the "Blondie" comic strip; Dwayne Shattuck (1983), Emmy Award-winning producer of "Mad Men" and "Magic City;" Elizabeth Carlock Harris (1961), former First Lady of Georgia; Terry Kay (1959), best-selling author ("To Dance with the White Dog"); and Blake Clark (1969), television and film actor ("Home Improvement," "The Waterboy" and "Boy Meets World").
