= Monarch Stadium (Methodist University) =

College football stadium in Fayetteville, North Carolina

Coordinates: 35.1332°N 78.8718°W

- Interactive map of Monarch Stadium
- Full name: Monarch Stadium
- Location: Fayetteville, North Carolina
- Owner: Methodist University
- Capacity: 800
- Surface: Grass

Construction
- Opened: 1989

Tenant
- Methodist Monarchs

Monarch Stadium is a college football stadium located in Fayetteville, North Carolina, United States. The stadium is the home field of the Methodist Monarchs. The stadium originally had grass seating until chair-back seating for 800 was added in 1999. Visitors are seated on portable risers that are set on the outer edge of the stadium's track, opposite to home seating. Visitors and Home fans are required to seat next to each other. The Monarchs compete in the National Collegiate Athletic Association (NCAA) Division III USA South Athletic Conference.
