= Demorest, Georgia =

- City
- Location in Habersham County and the state of Georgia
- Coordinates: 34°33′54″N 83°32′33″W
- Country: United States
- State: Georgia
- County: Habersham
- Founded: November 13, 1889

Government
  - Type: Council - Manager
  - Mayor: Jerry Harkness
  - City Manager: Mark Musselwhite

Area
  - Total: 2.27 sq mi (5.88 km^{2})
  - Land: 2.24 sq mi (5.81 km^{2})
  - Water: 0.031 sq mi (0.08 km^{2})
- Elevation: 1,312 ft (400 m)

Population (2020)
  - Total: 2,022
  - Density: 901.4/sq mi (348.05/km^{2})
- Time zone: UTC-5 (Eastern (EST))
  - Summer (DST): UTC-4 (EDT)
- ZIP codes: 30535, 30544
- Area code: 706
- FIPS code: 13-22304
- GNIS feature ID: 2404215
- Website: www.cityofdemorest.org

Demorest (/ˈdɛmərɪst/ DEM-ə-rist) is a city in Habersham County, Georgia, United States. The population was 2,022 at the 2020 census, up from 1,823 at the 2010 census, and 1,465 at the 2000 census. It is the home of Piedmont University.

== Geography ==
Demorest is located in south-central Habersham County. U.S. Route 441 Business (signed "U.S. 441 Historic Route") runs through the center of town as Central Avenue, leading north 4 miles (6 km) to Clarkesville, the county seat, and south 4 miles to Cornelia.

According to the United States Census Bureau, Demorest has a total area of 2.3 square miles (5.9 km^{2}), of which 2.2 square miles (5.8 km^{2}) are land and 0.04 square miles (0.1 km^{2}), or 1.28%, are water.

== Demographics ==
Historical population
Census	Pop.	Note	%±
1890	208		—
1900	560		169.2%
1910	760		35.7%
1920	686		−9.7%
1930	730		6.4%
1940	820		12.3%
1950	1,166		42.2%
1960	1,029		−11.7%
1970	1,070		4.0%
1980	1,130		5.6%
1990	1,088		−3.7%
2000	1,465		34.7%
2010	1,823		24.4%
2020	2,022		10.9%
U.S. Decennial Census

=== Racial and ethnic composition ===
Demorest city, Georgia – Racial and ethnic composition Note: the US Census treats Hispanic/Latino as an ethnic category. This table excludes Latinos from the racial categories and assigns them to a separate category. Hispanics/Latinos may be of any race.
Race / Ethnicity (NH = Non-Hispanic)	Pop 2000	Pop 2010	Pop 2020	% 2000	% 2010	% 2020
White alone (NH)	1,335	1,569	1,613	91.13%	86.07%	79.77%
Black or African American alone (NH)	58	57	107	3.96%	3.13%	5.29%
Native American or Alaska Native alone (NH)	7	4	2	0.48%	0.22%	0.10%
Asian alone (NH)	9	26	22	0.61%	1.43%	1.09%
Native Hawaiian or Pacific Islander alone (NH)	0	0	14	0.00%	0.00%	0.69%
Other race alone (NH)	2	3	20	0.14%	0.16%	0.99%
Mixed race or Multiracial (NH)	5	40	80	0.34%	2.19%	3.96%
Hispanic or Latino (any race)	49	124	164	3.34%	6.80%	8.11%
Total	1,465	1,823	2,022	100.00%	100.00%	100.00%

Although Demorest remains a predominantly non-Hispanic white city, the Latino population has been growing rapidly to become the 2nd largest minority since 2010.

=== 2020 census ===
As of the 2020 census, Demorest had a population of 2,022.The median age was 26.6 years. 17.8% of residents were under the age of 18 and 14.2% were 65 years of age or older. For every 100 females, there were 82.2 males, and for every 100 females age 18 and over there were 82.8 males age 18 and over.

90.6% of residents lived in urban areas, while 9.4% lived in rural areas.

There were 662 households in Demorest, including 395 families. Of all households, 26.4% had children under the age of 18 living in them. 37.8% were married-couple households, 20.1% were households with a male householder and no spouse or partner present, and 36.7% were households with a female householder and no spouse or partner present. About 36.0% of all households were made up of individuals, and 13.6% had someone living alone who was 65 years of age or older.

There were 728 housing units, of which 9.1% were vacant. The homeowner vacancy rate was 1.4% and the rental vacancy rate was 4.6%.

=== 2000 census ===
As of the 2000 census, there were 1,465 people, 498 households, and 292 families residing in the city. The population density was 644.4 inhabitants per square mile (248.8/km^{2}). There were 564 housing units at an average density of 248.1 units per square mile (95.8 units/km^{2}). The racial makeup of the city was 92.70% White, 3.96% African American, 0.55% Native American, 0.61% Asian, 0.07% Pacific Islander, 1.77% from other races, and 0.34% from two or more races. Hispanic or Latino of any race were 3.34% of the population.

There were 498 households, out of which 23.7% had children under the age of 18 living with them, 43.2% were married couples living together, 12.9% had a female householder with no husband present, and 41.2% were non-families. 36.9% of all households were made up of individuals, and 14.5% had someone living alone who was 65 years of age or older. The average household size was 2.12 and the average family size was 2.77.

In the city, the population was spread out, with 15.1% under the age of 18, 28.6% from 18 to 24, 21.4% from 25 to 44, 17.6% from 45 to 64, and 17.3% who were 65 years of age or older. The median age was 32 years. For every 100 females, there were 84.5 males. For every 100 females age 18 and over, there were 80.6 males.

The median income for a household in the city was $31,382, and the median income for a family was $39,917. Males had a median income of $29,485 versus $24,861 for females. The per capita income for the city was $14,981. About 7.8% of families and 12.2% of the population were below the poverty line, including 17.2% of those under age 18 and 7.2% of those age 65 or over.

== History ==
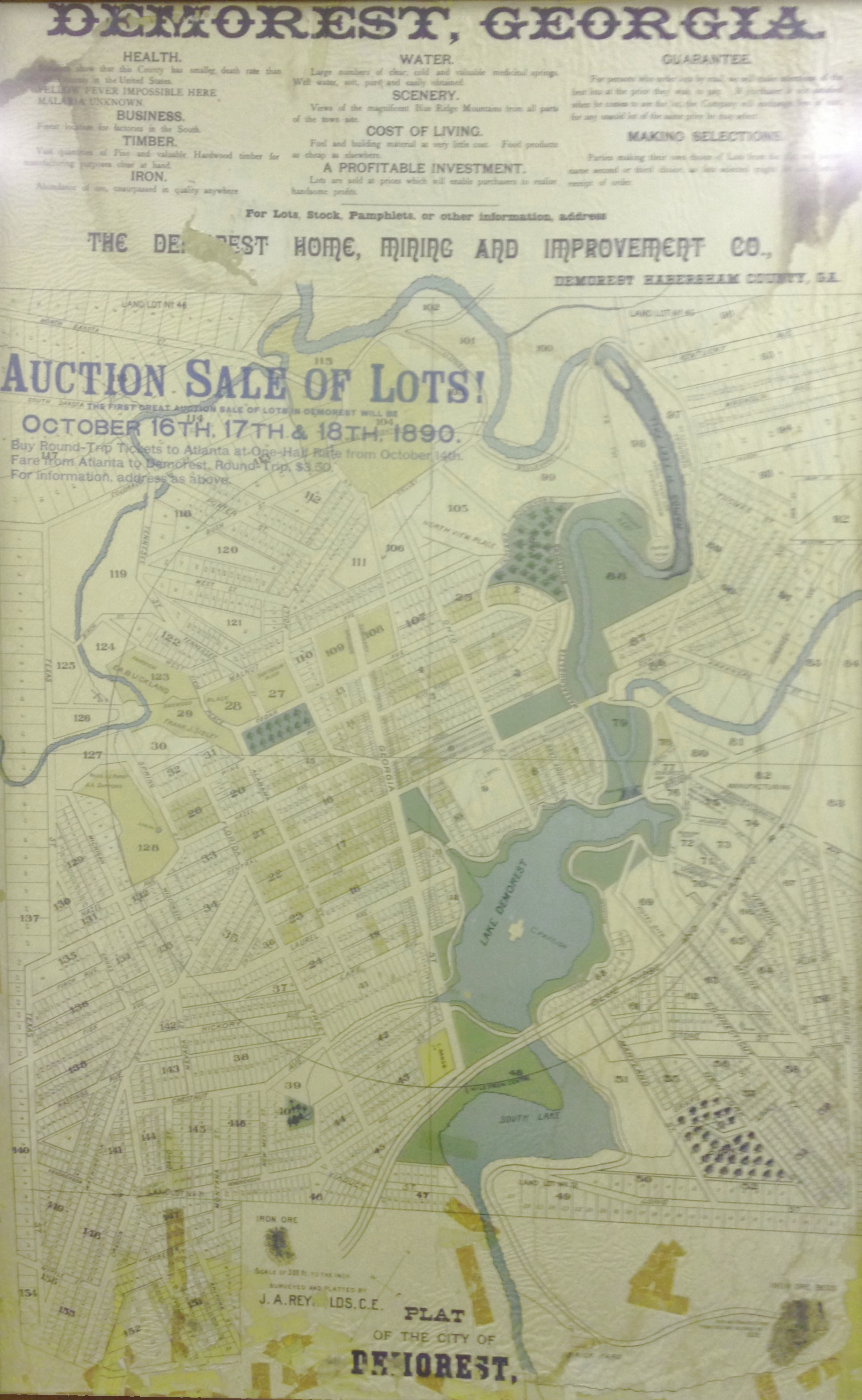
Map of land plat and property lines for an auction of land in Demorest, Georgia in Habersham County. The auction was put on by the Demorest Home, Mining and Improvement Company, which was at one point the largest land owner in Demorest. The map shows the location of the former Lake Demorest, the Blue Ridge and Atlantic Rail Road, and Hazel Creek.

The land where Demorest is now located was given by the State of Georgia to W. Stripling in 1829. Stripling did little with the land aside from maintaining a family farm. In 1840, the land was transferred to Dr. Paul Rossignol who built a summer home on the west side of Lake Demorest. That house became significant to the history of Demorest. Among other things, it was one of the first buildings used by Piedmont College, now Piedmont University, which was established in 1897.

Demorest was platted in 1890 as a temperance town, and named after William Jennings Demorest, a prohibition advocate. Georgia General Assembly incorporated the place as the "City of Demorest" in 1889.

== Notable landmarks ==
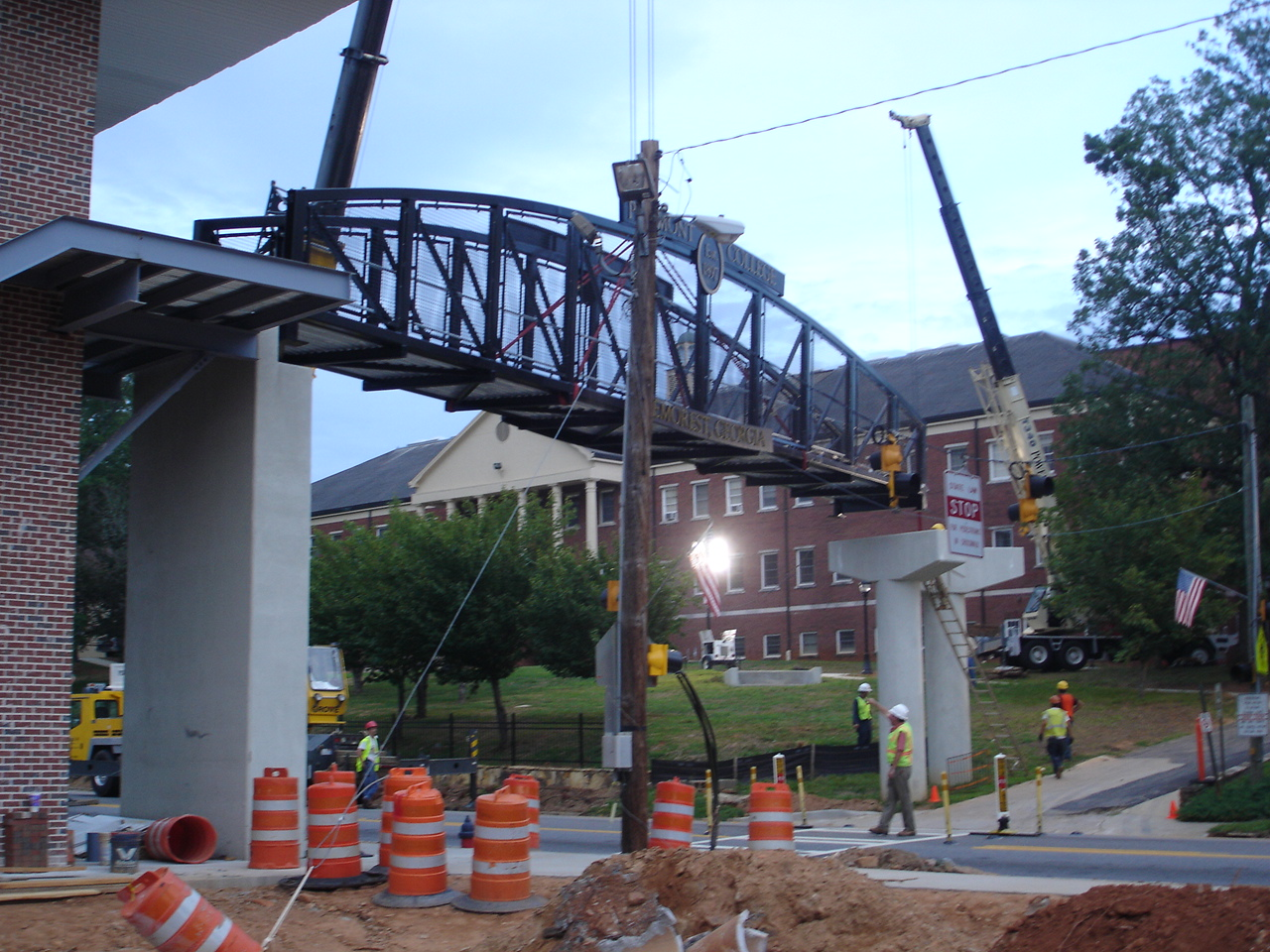
The new pedestrian footbridge has a ramp on one side and an elevator and stairs on the other.

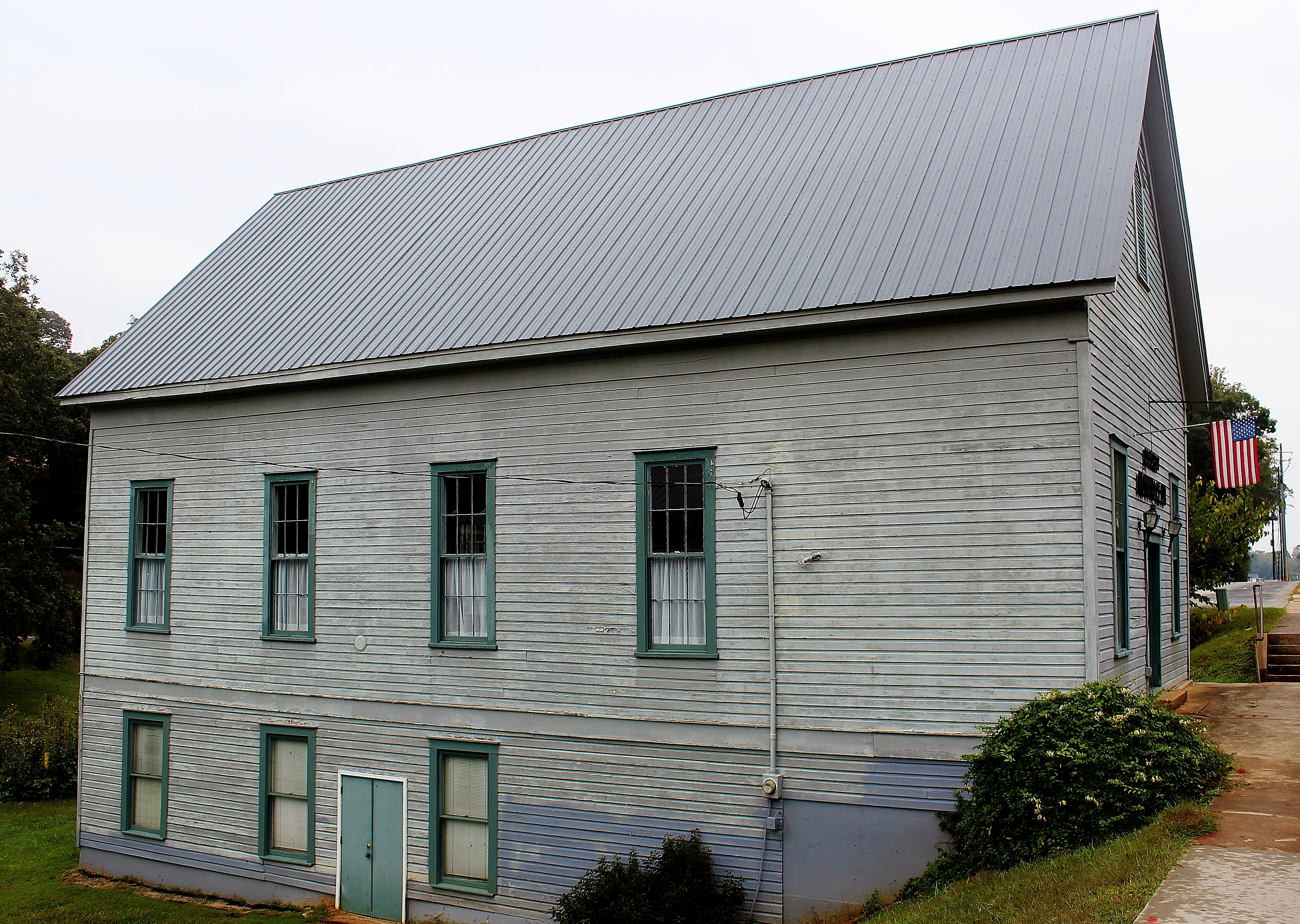
The Demorest Women's Club in downtown next to the pedestrian footbridge

Notable landmarks in the city include Demorest Springs Park, the Old Demorest Train Depot, Demorest Women's Club and the former Lake Demorest.

One of Demorest's most popular landmarks is the Johnny Mize Athletic Center and Museum. The museum is owned by Piedmont University and is named for Baseball Hall of Famer Johnny Mize. Mize was born in Demorest, and played baseball at Piedmont. The museum houses Mize memorabilia from his time at Piedmont as well as from his professional baseball career with the St. Louis Cardinals, New York Giants and the New York Yankees. In addition to the museum, Mize's childhood home is a Georgia Historical site with a private owner.

The most recent landmark is the new addition of the pedestrian bridge over a span of Historic U.S. 441 in front of the Piedmont University campus. The new bridge was assembled off-site and lowered into place by crane. The bridge was modeled after the Vanderbilt University 21st Avenue Pedestrian Bridge. The installation of the bridge was a joint project of the Georgia Department of Transportation, Piedmont College and the city of Demorest.
