= National Association of Congregational Christian Churches =

American association of Congregationalist churches

- Abbreviation: NACCC
- Classification: Protestant
- Orientation: Mainline
- Polity: Congregational
- Headquarters: Oak Creek, Wisconsin
- Origin: 1955
- Branched from: General Council of Congregational Christian Churches
- Congregations: 304 (2023)
- Members: 35,000 (2020)
- Official website: NACC

The National Association of Congregational Christian Churches (NACCC) is an association of 304 churches providing fellowship for and services to churches from the Congregational tradition. The Association maintains its national office in Oak Creek, Wisconsin, a suburb of Milwaukee. The body was founded in 1955 by former clergy and laypeople of the Congregational Christian Churches in response to that denomination's pending merger with the Evangelical and Reformed Church to form the United Church of Christ in 1957.

The NACCC has congregations in 36 states, with concentrations in California, Connecticut, Illinois, Maine, Massachusetts, Michigan, and Wisconsin.

== History ==
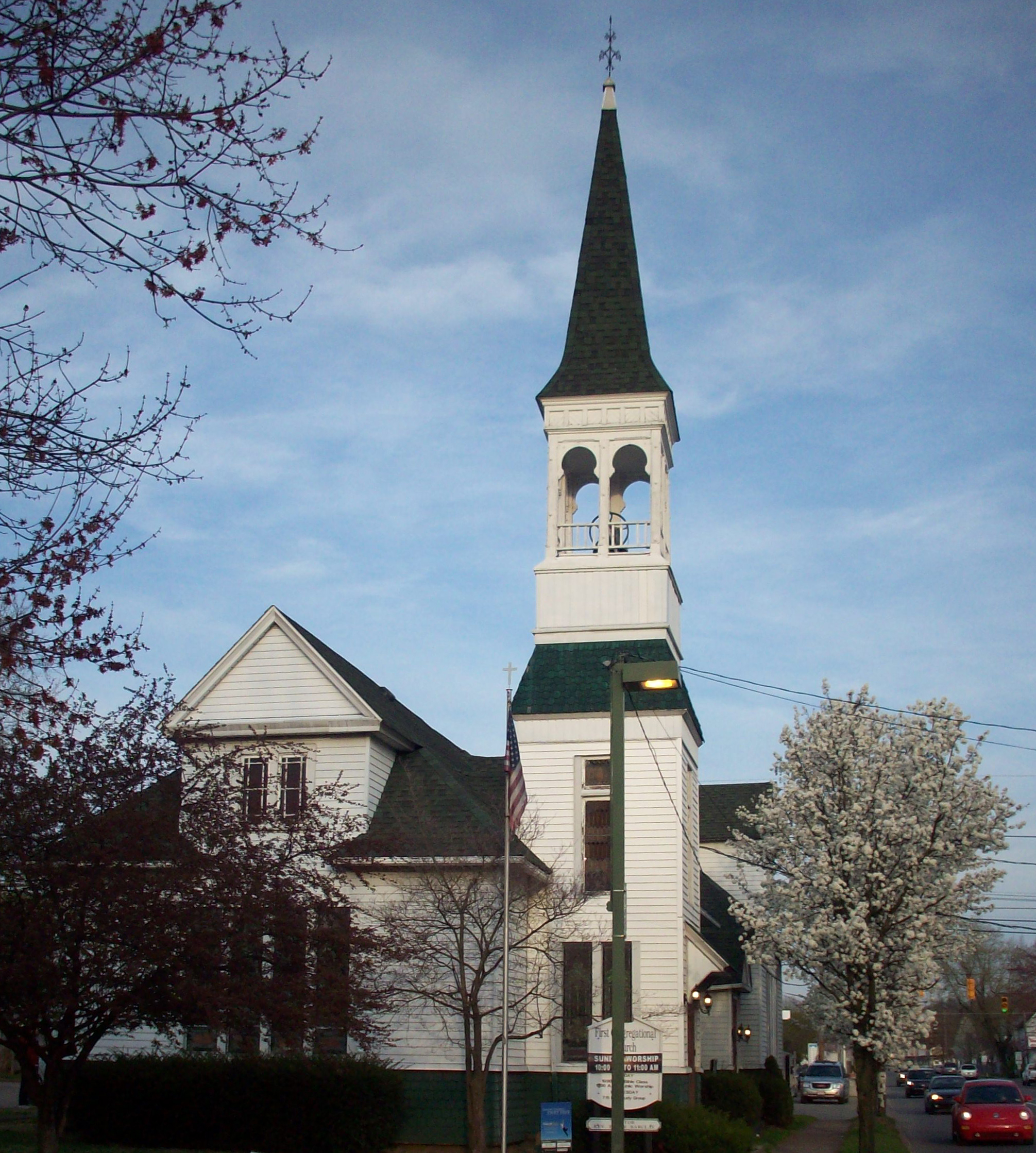
First Congregational Church, an NACCC church in Ceredo, West Virginia.

The NACCC belongs to the American Congregationalist tradition, which originated as part of the English Puritan movement, which was strongly influenced by Calvinism. By the early 20th century, Congregational churches affiliated with the National Council of Congregational Churches and participated in that body's 1931 merger with the General Convention of the Christian Church, which created the General Council of Congregational Christian Churches. The churches that eventually formed the NACCC opposed subsequent initiatives to merge the Congregational Christian Churches with the Evangelical and Reformed Church to form the United Church of Christ.

Central to their opposition was the belief that the merger would create unwieldy bureaucracies that might impinge upon the historic freedom of the local congregation, one of the few ideas that have united this otherwise theologically diverse fellowship. These concerns drove activists, beginning after World War II when talks between the national entities of the two merging denominations reached the point of preliminary organization planning, to persuade local Congregational Christian churches to refuse their support to this movement. These clergy and laypeople first organized at a meeting in Evanston, Illinois, in 1947 to express their concerns about not only the possible loss of autonomy on behalf of individual churches, but also their contentions that the General Council of the CC Churches possessed no authority to enter its churches into any legal union with another denomination. Other related issues were control over missionary funds and a possible diversion of some of them into ministerial pension annuities; fears of imposition of creeds, confessions, and neo-orthodox theology onto their ministers (who generally favored a 19th-century liberal, tolerant outlook); and ownership of church property in cases of congregations withdrawing from the proposed UCC.

When the CC national General Council adopted a "Basis of Union" with the E&R Church in 1948, the dissenters organized into two groups: the Committee for the Continuation of Congregational Christian Churches, formed by the pastor of Los Angeles' Congregational Church of the Messiah, Harry R. Butman; and the League to Uphold Congregational Principles, led by a Hartford, Connecticut pastor, Henry Gray. These two groups conducted an extensive pamphlet and church-meeting campaign to forestall the merger process, despite the General Council's and the E&R General Synod's revision of the Basis in favor of explicit congregational autonomy. Their counterpart on the pro-UCC side of the denominational merger debate was the then-current CC general minister and president, Douglas Horton.

When these efforts only produced a small minority of sympathizers, some "continuing" clergy and laypeople in a Brooklyn congregation decided to take legal action, suing CC moderator Helen Kenyon in 1949, in order to place a legal restraint on the process. Some years later, after appellate courts reversed the lower court's finding in favor of the merger opponents, the activists turned instead to forming a new fellowship, with no legal claims to any portion of the assets of the majority.

Representatives from 102 U.S. Congregational Christian churches met at a Detroit hotel in 1955 to organize the NACCC as an alternative to joining the UCC. Because the existing denominational organization was being transferred to the UCC, the NACCC started out without any funds, staff, or organizational structure. Dr. Harry Johnson of Idaho, who previously been superintendent of the Intermountain Conference of the Congregational Christian Churches, became its first Executive Secretary in 1956. He was succeeded in 1959 by the Rev. Neil Swanson, minister of a church in Wauwatosa, Wisconsin. Under Swanson's leadership, the first denominational office was established in Milwaukee. The NACCC moved into its own newly-built headquarters building in Oak Creek in 1973.

All Congregational-heritage colleges except for Piedmont College in Georgia approved the UCC merger, which finally took place in 1957. Piedmont joined the UCC in the early 2000s while keeping its NACCC affiliation.

== Current ethos and practices ==
During the 1960s through the 1990s, the NACCC slowly built a network of, or formed alliances with, voluntarily-supported missions and agencies to replace those lost in the UCC merger. One distinction between the NACCC and UCC is the former body's refusal to engage in political activity on behalf of its constituent churches. By its governing ethos, the NACCC refrains from taking political positions of any kind.

The NACCC's commitment to local church autonomy is so pronounced, that it has adopted a highly unusual measure in its national legislative process. Congregations taking exception to measures passed by the NACCC's annual meeting may seek a referendum vote in order to have the legislation vetoed. This appears to be a unique practice not found in any other American Protestant denomination.

In terms of the ministry, the NACCC, again, respects local autonomy to the point of refusing to keep a membership list for those clergy serving its churches, although the denomination's annual yearbook provides a list of known pastors for convenient reference. Ordination by a local church is sufficient for recognition by this tradition; clergy from other congregations may participate in the ordination service at their discretion, but their presence conveys no special authority over the procedure, as is the case with an association and/or conference in the UCC.

Regional associations in the NACCC are strictly for the purpose of fellowship and mutual edification; like the national entity, they have no authority whatsoever over their member congregations. Also, unlike the UCC, there is no necessary relationship between a regional association and the NACCC. In fact, a congregation can belong to the NACCC without simultaneously belonging to a regional group. By contrast, in the UCC, a church must hold membership in the association covering its geographic territory before participating in the affairs of its conference and the General Synod. Further, unlike the UCC where congregations have no direct representation in the General Synod, each NACCC congregation may send its clergy and delegate to the national annual meeting.

Congregations have the authority to determine their own criteria for ordination and to ordain clergy and are autonomous on congregational positions. Congregations may determine their own teaching on marriage and human sexuality; some congregations choose to perform same-sex marriages while others define marriage as heterosexual.

The NACCC does not have organizational affiliations with interdenominational organizations such as the National Council of Churches and the World Council of Churches. It did not participate in the Consultation on Church Union.

== Relationships with other Congregational bodies ==
Another Congregational denomination whose member churches mostly stayed out of the UCC, the Conservative Congregational Christian Conference, came into being not primarily because of church governance disputes, but because of decades-long opposition to the dominant liberal theological orientation in the main part of American Congregationalism. Founded in 1948, the CCCC (or "4C's", colloquially) had no relation to the "continuing" movement per se, although some congregations may belong to both bodies simultaneously. The body requires its member churches to subscribe to, as its name implies, a standard evangelical statement of faith. As Congregational churches, neither the NACCC nor the UCC requires its congregations to adhere to any specific doctrinal position.

In fact, some NACCC congregations have actually retained nominal ties to the UCC, via the latter's listing of special "schedule" categories of membership. Resulting from the submission of the UCC Constitution and Bylaws to each individual Congregational Christian church for approval (a condition of membership to all UCC associations and conferences), those congregations who did not vote at all or voted disapproval but who did not take action to withdraw from their associations (or conferences, in the absence of associations) remained listed in that denomination's yearbook. As of 2011, 95 churches continue to hold this status in the UCC, although not all of them are NACCC members. Some NACCC churches, though, are simultaneously full members of the UCC.

== See also ==
- Congregational Library
- Congregationalist polity
- Congregationalism in the United States
