= List of William & Mary Tribe men's basketball seasons =

The William & Mary Tribe men's basketball team competes in Division I of the National Collegiate Athletic Association (NCAA), representing the College of William & Mary in the Colonial Athletic Association. William & Mary has played its home games at Kaplan Arena at William & Mary Hall in Williamsburg, Virginia since 1971.

== Seasons ==
Statistics overview
Season	Coach	Overall	Conference	Standing	Postseason
William & Mary (1905–1936)
1905–1906	J. Merrill Blanchard	4–1			
1906–1907	H.W. Withers	1–4			
1907–1908	F.M. Crawford	1–4			
1908–1909	F.M. Crawford	7–3			
1909–1910	F.M. Crawford	1–3			
1910-1911	F.M. Crawford	3–1			
1911-1912	William J. Young	2–5			
1912-1913	William J. Young	8–1			
1913-1914	D.W. Draper	3–6			
1914-1915	D.W. Draper	5–8			
1915-1916	D.W. Draper	7–4			
1916-1917	S.H. Hubbard	4–9			
1917-1918	H.K. Young	6–11			
1918-1919	V.M. Geddy	3–6			
1919-1920	James G. Driver	5–7			
1920-1921	James G. Driver	8–3			
1921-1922	James G. Driver	10–2			
1922-1923	James G. Driver	8–4			
1923-1924	J. Wilder Tasker	7–13			
1924-1925	J. Wilder Tasker	11–6			
1925-1926	J. Wilder Tasker	9–8			
1926-1927	J. Wilder Tasker	7–8			
1927-1928	J. Wilder Tasker	16–4			
1928-1929	L. Tucker Jones	9–11			
1929-1930	John Kellison	16–6			
1930–1931	John Kellison	13–4			
1931–1932	John Kellison	13–6			
1932–1933	John Kellison	13–5			
1933–1934	John Kellison	4–9			
1934–1935	Tom Dowler	10–5			
1935–1936	Tom Dowler	11–6			
William & Mary (Southern Conference) (1936–1977)
1936–1937	Tom Dowler	0–18	0–13	16th	
1937–1938	John Kellison	2–10	0–8	15th	
1938–1939	John Kellison	9–12	4–9	T-12th	
1939–1940	Dwight Steussy	13–10	6–5	T-8th	
1940–1941	Dwight Steussy	15–10	8–3	T-2nd	
1941–1942	Dwight Steussy	15–9	8–4	T-5th	
1942–1943	Dwight Steussy	11–10	6–4	6th	
1943–1944	Rube McCray	10–11	1–3	10th	
1944–1945	Rube McCray	7–10	3–4	7th	
1945–1946	S.B. Holt	10–10	5–5	6th	
1946–1947	Richard F. Gallagher	14–12	6–6	9th	
1947–1948	Bernard E. Wilson	13–10	8–7	T-8th	
1948–1949	Bernard E. Wilson	24–10	10–3	2nd	Cincinnati Invitational Tournament
1949–1950	Bernard E. Wilson	23–9	12–4	T-2nd	Cincinnati Invitational Tournament
1950–1951	Bernard E. Wilson	20–11	13–6	T-4th	
1951–1952	H. Lester Hooker	15–13	10–6	8th	
1952–1953	Boydston H. Baird	10–13	6–13	12th	
1953–1954	Boydston H. Baird	9–14	6–5	5th	
1954–1955	Boydston H. Baird	11–14	7–5	6th	
1955–1956	Boydston H. Baird	12–14	9–7	5th	
1956–1957	Boydston H. Baird	9–18	7–11	6th	
1957–1958	Bill Chambers	15–14	9–9	5th	
1958–1959	William B. Chambers	13–11	7–7	4th	
1959–1960	William B. Chambers	15–11	10–5	3rd	
1960–1961	William B. Chambers	14–10	9–6	4th	
1961–1962	William B. Chambers	7–17	5–11	T-8th	
1962–1963	William B. Chambers	15–9	10–5	3rd	
1963–1964	William B. Chambers	9–13	5–9	7th	
1964–1965	William B. Chambers	12–13	6–8	6th	
1965–1966	William B. Chambers	13–12	8–3	3rd	
1966–1967	Warren Mitchell	14–11	8–5	3rd	
1967–1968	Warren Mitchell	6–18	4–10	8th	
1968–1969	Warren Mitchell	6–20	3–8	7th	
1969–1970	Warren Mitchell	11–16	5–7	5th	
1970–1971	Warren Mitchell	11–16	7–3	2nd	
1971–1972	Warren Mitchell	10–17	6–4	3rd	
1972–1973	Ed Ashnault	10–17	5–6	5th	
1973–1974	Ed Ashnault	9–18	5–6	5th	
1974–1975	George Balanis	16–12	6–5	3rd	
1975–1976	George Balanis	15–13	8–3	2nd	
1976–1977	George Balanis	16–14	7–4	4th	
William & Mary (ECAC South) (1977–1984)
1977–1978	Bruce Parkhill	16–10			
1978–1979	Bruce Parkhill	9–17			
1979–1980	Bruce Parkhill	12–15			
1980–1981	Bruce Parkhill	16–12	6–4	4th	
1981–1982	Bruce Parkhill	16–12	6–5	4th	
1982–1983	Bruce Parkhill	20–9	9–0	1st	NIT 1st Round
1983–1984	Barry Parkhill	14–14	6–4	T-2nd	
1984–1985	Barry Parkhill	16–12	9–5	4th	
William & Mary (Colonial Athletic Association) (1985–Present)
1985–1986	Barry Parkhill	8–20	3–11	T-6th	
1986–1987	Barry Parkhill	5–22	2–12	8th	
1987–1988	Chuck Swenson	10–19	5–9	T-6th	
1988–1989	Chuck Swenson	5–23	3–11	7th	
1989–1990	Chuck Swenson	6–22	2–12	8th	
1990–1991	Chuck Swenson	13–15	6–8	T-5th	
1991–1992	Chuck Swenson	10–19	3–11	T-7th	
1992–1993	Chuck Swenson	14–13	6–8	T-4th	
1993–1994	Chuck Swenson	4–23	2–12	8th	
1994–1995	Charlie Woollum	8–19	6–8	6th	
1995–1996	Charlie Woollum	10–16	6–10	T-6th	
1996–1997	Charlie Woollum	12–16	8–8	5th	
1997–1998	Charlie Woollum	20–7	13–3	T-1st	
1998–1999	Charlie Woollum	8–19	3–13	8th	
1999–2000	Charlie Woollum	11–17	6–10	T-6th	
2000–2001	Rick Boyages	11–17	7–9	T-5th	
2001–2002	Rick Boyages	10–19	7–11	T-6th	
2002–2003	Rick Boyages	12–16	7–11	8th	
2003–2004	Tony Shaver	7–21	4–14	T-8th	
2004–2005	Tony Shaver	8–21	3–15	T-8th	
2005–2006	Tony Shaver	8–20	3–15	T-10th	
2006–2007	Tony Shaver	15–15	8–10	T-7th	
2007–2008	Tony Shaver	17–16	10–8	5th	
2008–2009	Tony Shaver	10–20	5–13	T-10th	
2009–2010	Tony Shaver	22–11	12–6	T-3rd	NIT 1st Round
2010–2011	Tony Shaver	10–22	4–14	11th	
2011–2012	Tony Shaver	6–26	4–14	10th	
2012–2013	Tony Shaver	13–17	7–11	8th	
2013–2014	Tony Shaver	20–12	10–6	3rd	
2014–2015	Tony Shaver	20–13	12–6	T-1st	NIT 1st Round
2015–2016	Tony Shaver	20–11	11–7	T-3rd	
2016–2017	Tony Shaver	17–14	10–8	T-4th	
2017–2018	Tony Shaver	19–12	11–7	4th	
2018–2019	Tony Shaver	14–17	10–8	4th	
2019–2020	Dane Fischer	21–11	13–5	2nd	
2020–2021	Dane Fischer	7–10	4–6	7th	
2021–2022	Dane Fischer	5–27	4–14	9th	
2022–2023	Dane Fischer	13–20	7–11	8th	
2023–2024	Dane Fischer	10–23	4–14	13th	
2024–2025	Brian Earl	17–15	11–7	4th	
2025–2026	Brian Earl	20–12	10–8	T–5th	
Total:		1,229–1,389			
National champion Postseason invitational champion Conference regular season champion Conference regular season and conference tournament champion Division regular season champion Division regular season and conference tournament champion Conference tournament champion
