= 1932–33 William & Mary Indians men's basketball team =

American college basketball season

1932–33 William & Mary Indians men's basketball

Virginia Conference champion
- Conference: Virginia Conference
- Record: 13–5 (11–0 Virginia)
- Head coach: John Kellison (4th season)
- Home arena: Blow Gymnasium

1932–33 Virginia Conference men's basketball standings
	Conf.				Overall
Team	W		L	PCT	W		L	PCT
William & Mary	11	–	0	1.000	13	–	5	.722
Emory and Henry	5	–	1	.833	17	–	1	.944
American	5	–	1	.833	11	–	2	.846
Roanoke	6	–	3	.667	8	–	3	.727
Richmond	6	–	4	.600	8	–	4	.667
Randolph–Macon	5	–	10	.333	11	–	11	.500
Hampden–Sydney	4	–	9	.308	8	–	10	.444
Lynchburg	3	–	6	.333	7	–	9	.438
Bridgewater	0	–	11	.000	0	–	14	.000

The 1932–33 William & Mary Indians men's basketball team represented the College of William & Mary as a member of Virginia Conference during the 1932–33 NCAA men's basketball season. Led by fourth-year head coach John Kellison, the Indians compiled an overall record of 13–5 with a mark of 11–0 in conference play, winning the Virginia Conference title. This was the 28th season of the collegiate basketball program at William & Mary, whose nickname is now the Tribe.

== Schedule ==
Date time, TV	Opponent	Result	Record	Site city, state
December 14, 1932*	at Navy	L 46–57	0–1	Annapolis, MD
December 15, 1932*	at St. John's (MD)	L 24–25	0–2	Annapolis, MD
January 7, 1933	Roanoke	W 36–26	1–2	Blow Gymnasium; Williamsburg, VA
January 10, 1933*	at Virginia	L 35–45	1–3	Memorial Gymnasium; Charlottesville, VA
January 14, 1933	at Hampden–Sydney	W 26–23	2–3	Hampden Sydney, VA
January 16, 1933	Lynchburg	W 39–32	3–3	Blow Gymnasium; Williamsburg, VA
January 18, 1933	at Randolph–Macon	W 32–27	4–3	Ashland, VA
January 21, 1933*	Guilford	W 45–20	5–3	Blow Gymnasium; Williamsburg, VA
February 4, 1933	at Richmond	W 49–25	6–3	Millhiser Gymnasium; Richmond, VA
February 7, 1933*	Georgia	L 32–33	6–4	Blow Gymnasium; Williamsburg, VA
February 9, 1933*	at Washington and Lee	L 36–50	6–5	Lexington, VA
February 10, 1933	at Bridgewater	W 47–22	7–5	Bridgewater, VA
February 11, 1933*	at VMI	W 27–21	8–5	Lexington, VA
February 14, 1933	Bridgewater	W 51–13	9–5	Blow Gymnasium; Williamsburg, VA
February 16, 1933	Emory & Henry	W 32–25	10–5	Blow Gymnasium; Williamsburg, VA
February 18, 1933	Hampden–Sydney	W 27–23	11–5	Blow Gymnasium; Williamsburg, VA
February 21, 1933	Randolph–Macon	W 27–23	12–5	Blow Gymnasium; Williamsburg, VA
February 23, 1933	Richmond	W 40–37	13–5	Blow Gymnasium; Williamsburg, VA
*Non-conference game. (#) Tournament seedings in parentheses.
