= 1931–32 William & Mary Indians men's basketball team =

American college basketball season

1931–32 William & Mary Indians men's basketball

Virginia Conference champion
- Conference: Virginia Conference
- Record: 13–6 (11–1 Virginia)
- Head coach: John Kellison (3rd season)
- Home arena: Blow Gymnasium

1931–32 Virginia Conference men's basketball standings
	Conf.				Overall
Team	W		L	PCT	W		L	PCT
William & Mary	11	–	1	.917	13	–	6	.684
Richmond	7	–	3	.700	10	–	3	.769
Emory and Henry	5	–	3	.625	12	–	6	.667
Hampden–Sydney	6	–	5	.545	10	–	9	.526
Roanoke	5	–	8	.385	6	–	11	.353
Lynchburg	4	–	8	.333	7	–	9	.438
Randolph–Macon	4	–	9	.308	7	–	12	.368
Bridgewater	2	–	7	.222	5	–	10	.333

The 1931–32 William & Mary Indians men's basketball team represented the College of William & Mary as a member of Virginia Conference during the 1931–32 NCAA men's basketball season. Led by third-year head coach John Kellison, the Indians compiled an overall record of 13–6 with a mark of 11–1 in conference play, winning the Virginia Conference title. This was the 27th season of the collegiate basketball program at William & Mary, whose nickname is now the Tribe.

== Schedule ==
Date time, TV	Rank^{#}	Opponent^{#}	Result	Record	Site city, state
Regular season
*		at Virginia	L 32–33	0–1	Memorial Gymnasium; Charlottesville, VA
*		at NC State	L 19–23	0–2	Thompson Gym; Raleigh, NC
1/9/1932*		at Duke	L 20–28	0–3	Card Gymnasium; Durham, NC
*		Roanoke College	W 45–28	1–3	Blow Gymnasium; Williamsburg, VA
*		Lenoir–Rhyne	W 52–21	2–3	Blow Gymnasium; Williamsburg, VA
*		Hampden–Sydney	L 26–31	2–4	Blow Gymnasium; Williamsburg, VA
*		George Washington	L 35–37	2–5	Blow Gymnasium; Williamsburg, VA
2/6/1932*		Richmond	W 31–22	3–5	Blow Gymnasium; Williamsburg, VA
*		Hampden–Sydney	W 42–33	4–5	Blow Gymnasium; Williamsburg, VA
*		Bridgewater (VA)	W 37–31	5–5	Blow Gymnasium; Williamsburg, VA
*		at Washington and Lee	L 17–31	5–6	Lexington, VA
*		at Roanoke College	W 30–26	6–6	Roanoke, VA
*		at VMI	W 28–10	7–6	Lexington, VA
*		Emory & Henry	W 26–19	8–6	Blow Gymnasium; Williamsburg, VA
*		at Randolph–Macon	W 41–26	9–6	Ashland, VA
*		Lynchburg College	W 44–26	10–6	Blow Gymnasium; Williamsburg, VA
2/20/1932*		at Richmond	W 47–33	11–6	Millhiser Gymnasium; Richmond, VA
*		Randolph–Macon	W 31–28	12–6	Blow Gymnasium; Williamsburg, VA
*		Bridgewater (VA)	W 49–29	13–6	Blow Gymnasium; Williamsburg, VA
*Non-conference game. ^{#}Rankings from AP Poll. (#) Tournament seedings in parentheses.
