= 1930–31 William & Mary Indians men's basketball team =

American college basketball season

1930–31 William & Mary Indians men's basketball

Virginia Conference champion
- Conference: Virginia Conference
- Record: 13–4 (10–1 Virginia)
- Head coach: John Kellison (2nd season)
- Home arena: Blow Gymnasium

1930–31 Virginia Conference men's basketball standings
	Conf.				Overall
Team	W		L	PCT	W		L	PCT
William & Mary	10	–	1	.909	13	–	4	.765
Randolph–Macon	10	–	2	.833	16	–	7	.696
Lynchburg	6	–	4	.600	7	–	13	.350
Emory and Henry	3	–	2	.600	4	–	11	.267
Hampden–Sydney	6	–	6	.500	10	–	7	.588
Richmond	3	–	6	.333	6	–	8	.429
Bridgewater	3	–	7	.300	4	–	9	.308
Roanoke	0	–	13	.000	0	–	13	.000

The 1930–31 William & Mary Indians men's basketball team represented the College of William & Mary as a member of Virginia Conference during the 1930–31 NCAA men's basketball season. Led by second-year head coach John Kellison, the Indians compiled an overall record of 13–4 with a mark of 10–1 in conference play, winning the Virginia Conference title. This was the 26th season of the collegiate basketball program at William & Mary, whose nickname is now the Tribe.

== Schedule ==
Date time, TV	Rank^{#}	Opponent^{#}	Result	Record	Site city, state
Regular season
*		Fort Eustis	W 37–27	1–0	Blow Gymnasium; Williamsburg, VA
12/10/1930*		at Navy	L 30–32	1–1	Annapolis, MD
*		Emory & Henry	W 40–16	2–1	Blow Gymnasium; Williamsburg, VA
*		at Virginia	L 34–36	2–2	Memorial Gymnasium; Charlottesville, VA
*		at Hampden–Sydney	W 31–21	3–2	Hampden Sydney, VA
*		Medical College of Virginia	W 48–22	4–2	Blow Gymnasium; Williamsburg, VA
*		Randolph–Macon	L 24–28	4–3	Blow Gymnasium; Williamsburg, VA
2/9/1931*		Richmond	W 48–38	5–3	Blow Gymnasium; Williamsburg, VA
*		at Bridgewater (VA)	W 30–27	6–3	Bridgewater, VA
*		at Washington and Lee	L 31–44	6–4	Lexington, VA
*		at Roanoke College	W 40–21	7–4	Roanoke, VA
*		at VMI	W 29–28	8–4	Lexington, VA
*		Bridgewater (VA)	W 33–25	9–4	Blow Gymnasium; Williamsburg, VA
2/21/1931*		Richmond	W 40–10	10–4	Blow Gymnasium; Williamsburg, VA
*		Roanoke College	W 49–25	11–4	Blow Gymnasium; Williamsburg, VA
*		Hampden–Sydney	W 38–26	12–4	Blow Gymnasium; Williamsburg, VA
*		Randolph–Macon	W 39–27	13–4	Blow Gymnasium; Williamsburg, VA
*Non-conference game. ^{#}Rankings from AP Poll. (#) Tournament seedings in parentheses.
