= 1933–34 William & Mary Indians men's basketball team =

American college basketball season

1933–34 William & Mary Indians men's basketball
- Conference: Virginia Conference
- Record: 4–9 (2–4 Virginia)
- Head coach: John Kellison (5th season)
- Home arena: Blow Gymnasium

The 1933–34 William & Mary Indians men's basketball team represented the College of William & Mary as a member of Virginia Conference during the 1933–34 NCAA men's basketball season. Led by fifth-year head coach John Kellison, the Indians compiled an overall record of 4–9 with a mark of 2–4 in conference play. This was the 29th season of the collegiate basketball program at William & Mary, whose nickname is now the Tribe.

== Schedule ==
Date time, TV	Rank^{#}	Opponent^{#}	Result	Record	Site city, state
Regular season
*		at Virginia	L 27–42	0–1	Memorial Gymnasium; Charlottesville, VA
*		at Georgetown	L 29–40	0–2	Tech Gymnasium; Washington, DC
*		Roanoke College	W 41–40	1–2	Blow Gymnasium; Williamsburg, VA
*		Davidson	W 31–19	2–2	Blow Gymnasium; Williamsburg, VA
2/3/1934*		at Richmond	L 24–27	2–3	Millhiser Gymnasium; Richmond, VA
*		Guilford College	W 50–22	3–3	Blow Gymnasium; Williamsburg, VA
*		at Emory & Henry	L 28–43	3–4	Emory, VA
*		at Roanoke College	L 15–39	3–5	Roanoke, VA
*		at Washington and Lee	L 27–44	3–6	Lexington, VA
*		at VMI	L 19–23	3–7	Lexington, VA
*		Emory & Henry	L 18–36	3–8	Blow Gymnasium; Williamsburg, VA
2/20/1934*		Richmond	W 27–25	4–8	Blow Gymnasium; Williamsburg, VA
*		VMI	L 26–32	4–9	Blow Gymnasium; Williamsburg, VA
*Non-conference game. ^{#}Rankings from AP Poll. (#) Tournament seedings in parentheses.
