= 1929–30 William & Mary Indians men's basketball team =

American college basketball season

1929–30 William & Mary Indians men's basketball

Virginia Conference champion
- Conference: Virginia Conference
- Record: 16–6 (11–1 Virginia)
- Head coach: John Kellison (1st season)
- Home arena: Blow Gymnasium

1929–30 Virginia Conference men's basketball standings
	Conf.				Overall
Team	W		L	PCT	W		L	PCT
William & Mary	11	–	1	.917	16	–	6	.727
Randolph–Macon	10	–	3	.769	14	–	7	.667
Emory and Henry	3	–	2	.600	12	–	9	.571
Richmond	5	–	6	.455	7	–	8	.467
Lynchburg	5	–	6	.455		–		–
Hampden–Sydney	5	–	7	.417	5	–	9	.357
Roanoke	2	–	9	.182	2	–	10	.167
Bridgewater	1	–	8	.111	4	–	12	.250

The 1929–30 William & Mary Indians men's basketball team represented the College of William & Mary as a member of Virginia Conference during the 1929–30 NCAA men's basketball season. Led by first-year head coach John Kellison, the Indians compiled an overall record of 16–6 with a mark of 11–1 in conference play, winning the Virginia Conference title. This was the 25th season of the collegiate basketball program at William & Mary, whose nickname is now the Tribe.

== Schedule ==
Date time, TV	Rank^{#}	Opponent^{#}	Result	Record	Site city, state
Regular season
12/13/1929*		at Maryland	L 23–27	0–1	"The Gymnasium"; College Park, MD
12/14/1929*		at Navy	L 19–30	0–2	Annapolis, MD
12/14/1929*		at Delaware	W 38–22	1–2	Newark, DE
*		at Princeton	L 18–25	1–3	University Gymnasium; Princeton, NJ
*		at Hampden–Sydney	W 35–17	2–3	Hampden Sydney, VA
*		Randolph–Macon	L 20–38	2–4	Blow Gymnasium; Williamsburg, VA
*		at Virginia	W 33–17	3–4	Memorial Gymnasium; Charlottesville, VA
1/18/1930*		Richmond	W 31–22	4–4	Blow Gymnasium; Williamsburg, VA
*		Medical College of Virginia	W 43–21	5–4	Blow Gymnasium; Williamsburg, VA
*		at Washington and Lee	L 33–52	5–5	Lexington, VA
*		at VMI	W 40–22	6–5	Lexington, VA
*		at Virginia Tech	L 32–44	6–6	War Memorial Gymnasium; Blacksburg, VA
*		at Roanoke College	W 53–22	7–6	Roanoke, VA
*		at Bridgewater (VA)	W 39–13	8–6	Bridgewater, VA
*		Emory & Henry	W 34–25	9–6	Blow Gymnasium; Williamsburg, VA
*		Bridgewater (VA)	W 51–24	10–6	Blow Gymnasium; Williamsburg, VA
*		Roanoke College	W 53–22	11–6	Blow Gymnasium; Williamsburg, VA
*		Savage Normal	W 34–23	12–6	Blow Gymnasium; Williamsburg, VA
2/22/1930*		at Richmond	L 32–36	13–6	Millhiser Gymnasium; Richmond, VA
*		at Randolph–Macon	W 32–30	14–6	Ashland, VA
*		Lynchburg College	W 46–20	15–6	Blow Gymnasium; Williamsburg, VA
*		Hampden–Sydney	W 41–22	16–6	Blow Gymnasium; Williamsburg, VA
*Non-conference game. ^{#}Rankings from AP Poll. (#) Tournament seedings in parentheses.
