= 1928–29 William & Mary Indians men's basketball team =

American college basketball season

1928–29 William & Mary Indians men's basketball
- Conference: Virginia Conference
- Record: 9–11 (6–5 Virginia)
- Head coach: L. Tucker Jones (1st season)
- Home arena: Blow Gymnasium

1928–29 Virginia Conference men's basketball standings
	Conf.				Overall
Team	W		L	PCT	W		L	PCT
Richmond	8	–	2	.800	10	–	5	.667
Randolph–Macon	10	–	3	.769	18	–	4	.818
Hampden–Sydney	7	–	6	.538		–		–
William & Mary	6	–	5	.545	9	–	11	.450
Roanoke	3	–	7	.300	3	–	9	.250
Lynchburg	2	–	8	.200		–		–
Emory and Henry *	3	–	3	.500	11	–	7	.611
Bridgewater *	0	–	5	.000	4	–	10	.286
* – Did not play enough conference games to qualify for standings

The 1928–29 William & Mary Indians men's basketball team represented the College of William & Mary as a member of Virginia Conference during the 1928–29 NCAA men's basketball season. Led by L. Tucker Jones in his first and only season as head coach, the Indians compiled an overall record of 9–11 with a mark of 6–5 in conference play, placing fourth in the Virginia Conference. This was the 24th season of the collegiate basketball program at William & Mary, whose nickname is now the Tribe.

== Schedule ==
Date time, TV	Rank^{#}	Opponent^{#}	Result	Record	Site city, state
Regular season
*		at Johns Hopkins	L 23–28	0–1	Baltimore, MD
*		at Catholic University	W 24–16	1–1	Washington, DC
12/19/1928*		at Navy	L 19–33	1–2	Annapolis, MD
12/20/1928*		at Maryland	L 21–30	1–3	"The Gymnasium"; College Park, MD
*		Richmond YMCA	L 15–22	1–4	Blow Gymnasium; Williamsburg, VA
*		Medical College of Virginia	W 26–13	2–4	Blow Gymnasium; Williamsburg, VA
*		Hampden–Sydney	L 24–26	2–5	Blow Gymnasium; Williamsburg, VA
*		Roanoke College	W 24–21	3–5	Blow Gymnasium; Williamsburg, VA
1/19/1929*		at Richmond	L 32–36	3–6	Millhiser Gymnasium; Richmond, VA
*		at Washington and Lee	L 19–47	3–7	Lexington, VA
*		at VMI	L 19–32	3–8	Lexington, VA
*		at Roanoke College	L 21–25	3–9	Roanoke, VA
*		Randolph–Macon	L 33–42	3–10	Blow Gymnasium; Williamsburg, VA
*		Bridgewater (VA)	W 35–19	4–10	Blow Gymnasium; Williamsburg, VA
*		Lynchburg College	W 36–23	5–10	Blow Gymnasium; Williamsburg, VA
*		Emory & Henry	L 16–20	5–11	Blow Gymnasium; Williamsburg, VA
*		Hampden–Sydney	W 26–23	6–11	Blow Gymnasium; Williamsburg, VA
*		at Medical College of Virginia	W 35–23	7–11	Richmond, VA
*		Randolph–Macon	W 28–23	8–11	Blow Gymnasium; Williamsburg, VA
2/21/1929*		Richmond	W 34–30	9–11	Blow Gymnasium; Williamsburg, VA
*Non-conference game. ^{#}Rankings from AP Poll. (#) Tournament seedings in parentheses.
