= 1927–28 William & Mary Indians men's basketball team =

American college basketball season

1927–28 William & Mary Indians men's basketball

Virginia Conference champion
- Conference: Virginia Conference
- Record: 15–5 (9–0 Virginia)
- Head coach: J. Wilder Tasker (5th season)
- Home arena: Blow Gymnasium

1927–28 Virginia Conference men's basketball standings
	Conf.				Overall
Team	W		L	PCT	W		L	PCT
William & Mary	9	–	0	1.000	15	–	5	.750
Randolph–Macon	7	–	2	.778	17	–	9	.654
Richmond	7	–	3	.700	11	–	5	.688
Hampden–Sydney	4	–	7	.364	6	–	10	.375
Roanoke	2	–	4	.333	3	–	6	.333
Emory and Henry	1	–	2	.333	12	–	5	.706
Elon	1	–	2	.333	9	–	12	.429
Lynchburg	2	–	8	.200		–		–
Bridgewater	0	–	5	.000	4	–	10	.286

The 1927–28 William & Mary Indians men's basketball team represented the College of William & Mary as a member of Virginia Conference during the 1927–28 NCAA men's basketball season. Led by J. Wilder Tasker in his fifth and final season as head coach, the Indians compiled an overall record of 15–5 with a mark of 9–0 in conference play, winning the Virginia Conference title. This was the 23rd season of the collegiate basketball program at William & Mary, whose nickname is now the Tribe.

== Schedule ==
Date time, TV	Rank^{#}	Opponent^{#}	Result	Record	Site city, state
Regular season
*		Medical College of Virginia	W 40–17	1–0	Blow Gymnasium; Williamsburg, VA
*		Catholic University	W 24–17	2–0	Blow Gymnasium; Williamsburg, VA
*		Medical College of Virginia	W 40–17	3–0	Blow Gymnasium; Williamsburg, VA
*		Catholic University	L 24–36	3–1	Blow Gymnasium; Williamsburg, VA
12/17/1927*		at Navy	L 20–48	3–2	Annapolis, MD
*		Roanoke College	W 35–23	4–2	Blow Gymnasium; Williamsburg, VA
*		Lynchburg College	W 48–14	5–2	Blow Gymnasium; Williamsburg, VA
*		George Washington	L 33–34	5–3	Blow Gymnasium; Williamsburg, VA
1/17/1928*		Richmond	W 25–22	6–3	Blow Gymnasium; Williamsburg, VA
*		Emory & Henry	W 23–16	7–3	Blow Gymnasium; Williamsburg, VA
*		Steven's Tech	W 30–29	8–3	Blow Gymnasium; Williamsburg, VA
*		Wake Forest	W 48–24	9–3	Blow Gymnasium; Williamsburg, VA
2/4/1928*		Richmond	W 41–27	10–3	Blow Gymnasium; Williamsburg, VA
*		Guilford College	W 28–25	11–3	Blow Gymnasium; Williamsburg, VA
*		Wake Forest	W 42–28	12–3	Blow Gymnasium; Williamsburg, VA
*		Elon College	W 36–28	13–3	Blow Gymnasium; Williamsburg, VA
*		Guilford College	L 23–33	13–4	Blow Gymnasium; Williamsburg, VA
*		Hampden–Sydney	W 36–26	14–4	Blow Gymnasium; Williamsburg, VA
*		Lynchburg College	W 55–24	15–4	Blow Gymnasium; Williamsburg, VA
*		Brooklyn Polytech	W 50–19	16–4	Blow Gymnasium; Williamsburg, VA
*Non-conference game. ^{#}Rankings from AP Poll. (#) Tournament seedings in parentheses.
