= Chesapeake Conference =

US intercollegiate athletic conference

The Chesapeake Conference was an intercollegiate athletic conference composed of member schools located in the state of Virginia and Washington, D.C. The league existed from 1933 to 1937.

== History ==
The Chesapeake Conference was formed on January 12, 1933, by American University, Bridgewater College, Lynchburg College, Hampden–Sydney College and Randolph–Macon College. The latter two defected from the Virginia Conference over a freshman eligibility rule. By 1935, both Hampden–Sydney and Randolph–Macon were dissatisfied and considered returning to the Virginia Conference. At that time, however, that league had dwindled to only four members, and the following year disbanded after two left for the Southern Conference. In January 1937, Hampden–Sydney and Randolph–Macon were invited to join a potential new conference centered upon the state of Virginia and the Carolinas alongside Catawba, Lenoir-Rhyne, Elon, Presbyterian, Wofford, Erskine, Newberry, and Emory and Henry, but declined admission. The Chesapeake Conference continued to exist through the 1937 spring sports season, but had disbanded before the football season.

== Members ==
The following colleges held membership in the Chesapeake Conference:

- American (1933–1937)
- Bridgewater (1933–1935?)
- Hampden-Sydney (1933–1937)
- Lynchburg (1933–1935?)
- Randolph–Macon (1933–1936)

== Football champions ==
- 1933 – Randolph-Macon
- 1934 – Hampden-Sydney and Randolph-Macon
- 1935 – Randolph-Macon
- 1936 – Randolph-Macon
