= 1927 Roanoke Maroons football team =

American college football season

1927 Roanoke Maroons football
- Conference: Virginia Conference
- Record: 5–3–1 (2–1–1 Virginia)
- Head coach: Pinky Spruhan (14th season)
- Home stadium: College Field; Maher Field

1927 Virginia Conference football standings
	Conf.					Overall
Team	W		L		T	W		L		T
William & Mary $	2	–	0	–	1	4	–	5	–	1
Emory and Henry	1	–	0	–	0	9	–	0	–	0
Richmond	3	–	1	–	1	4	–	4	–	1
Roanoke	2	–	1	–	1	5	–	3	–	1
Randolph–Macon	1	–	2	–	1	2	–	3	–	1
Hampden–Sydney	1	–	3	–	0	4	–	5	–	0
Lynchburg	1	–	4	–	0	1	–	7	–	1
$ – Conference champion

The 1927 Roanoke Maroons football team represented Roanoke College as a member of the Virginia Conference during the 1927 college football season. Led by 14th-year head coach Pinky Spruhan, the Maroons compiled an overall record of 5–3–1, with a mark of 2–1–1 in conference play, and finished fourth in the Virginia Conference.

== Schedule ==
Date	Opponent	Site	Result	Attendance	Source
September 24	at VPI*	Miles Stadium; Blacksburg, VA	L 2–21		
October 1	Guilford*	College Field; Salem, VA	W 26–0		
October 8	at VMI*	Alumni Field; Lexington, VA	L 0–32		
October 15	Randolph–Macon	College Field; Salem, VA	T 0–0		
October 22	Atlantic Christian*	College Field; Salem, VA	W 75–0		
October 28	at Richmond	Westhampton Field; Richmond, VA	W 7–6		
November 4	Bridgewater	College Field; Salem, VA	W 82–0		
November 11	William & Mary	Maher Field; Roanoke, VA	L 7–18	5,000	
November 19	at Lynchburg	Municipal Stadium; Lynchburg, VA	W 20–6		
*Non-conference game
