= 1930 Richmond Spiders football team =

American college football season

1930 Richmond Spiders football
- Conference: Virginia Conference
- Record: 2–4–2 (2–2–2 Virginia)
- Head coach: Frank Dobson (17th season)
- Home stadium: City Stadium

1930 Virginia Conference football standings
| | Conf. | | | | | Overall |
| Team | W | | L | | T | W | | L | | T |
|---|---|---|---|---|---|---|---|---|---|---|
| William & Mary $ | 5 | – | 0 | – | 0 | 7 | – | 2 | – | 1 |
| Emory and Henry | 3 | – | 1 | – | 0 | 8 | – | 1 | – | 1 |
| Randolph–Macon | 3 | – | 2 | – | 1 | 3 | – | 5 | – | 2 |
| Roanoke | 3 | – | 2 | – | 2 | 3 | – | 4 | – | 2 |
| Richmond | 2 | – | 2 | – | 2 | 2 | – | 4 | – | 2 |
| Hampden–Sydney | 2 | – | 3 | – | 1 | 2 | – | 6 | – | 1 |
| Lynchburg | 1 | – | 4 | – | 0 | 1 | – | 7 | – | 0 |
| Bridgewater | 0 | – | 5 | – | 0 | 0 | – | 7 | – | 0 |
$ – Conference champion

The 1930 Richmond Spiders football team was an American football team that represented the University of Richmond as a member of the Virginia Conference during the 1930 college football season. Led by 17th-year head coach, Frank Dobson, Richmond compiled an overall record of 2–4–2.

== Schedule ==
| Date | Opponent | Site | Result | Attendance | Source |
|---|---|---|---|---|---|
| September 27 | at VMI* | Alumni Field; Lexington, VA (rivalry) | L 0–12 | | |
| October 4 | Washington and Lee* | City Stadium; Richmond, VA | L 0–14 | 4,000 | |
| October 11 | Lynchburg | City Stadium; Richmond, VA | W 27–0 | | |
| October 18 | at Roanoke | College Field; Salem, VA | T 0–0 | | |
| November 1 | Emory & Henry | City Stadium; Richmond, VA | L 0–6 | | |
| November 8 | Randolph–Macon | City Stadium; Richmond, VA | W 18–6 | 4,000 | |
| November 19 | Hampden–Sydney | City Stadium; Richmond, VA | T 0–0 | | |
| November 27 | William & Mary | City Stadium; Richmond, VA (rivalry) | L 0–19 | | |
*Non-conference game
