= 1930 Roanoke Maroons football team =

American college football season

1930 Roanoke Maroons football
- Conference: Virginia Conference
- Record: 3–4–2 (3–2–2 Virginia)
- Head coach: Gordon C. White (1st season)
- Home stadium: College Field

1930 Virginia Conference football standings
	Conf.					Overall
Team	W		L		T	W		L		T
William & Mary $	5	–	0	–	0	7	–	2	–	1
Emory and Henry	3	–	1	–	0	8	–	1	–	1
Randolph–Macon	3	–	2	–	1	3	–	5	–	2
Roanoke	3	–	2	–	2	3	–	4	–	2
Richmond	2	–	2	–	2	2	–	4	–	2
Hampden–Sydney	2	–	3	–	1	2	–	6	–	1
Lynchburg	1	–	4	–	0	1	–	7	–	0
Bridgewater	0	–	5	–	0	0	–	7	–	0
$ – Conference champion

The 1930 Roanoke Maroons football team represented Roanoke College as a member of the Virginia Conference during the 1930 college football season. Led by first-year head coach Gordon C. White, the Maroons compiled an overall record of 3–4–2, with a mark of 3–2–2 in conference play, and finished fourth in the Virginia Conference.

== Schedule ==
Date	Opponent	Site	Result	Source
September 20	at Virginia*	Lambeth Field; Charlottesville, VA	L 0–37	
September 27	at VPI*	Miles Stadium; Blacksburg, VA	L 0–9	
October 11	Bridgewater	College Field; Salem, VA	W 53–0	
October 11	Rutherford College*	College Field; Salem, VA	Canceled	
October 18	Richmond	College Field; Salem, VA	T 0–0	
October 25	Hampden–Sydney	College Field; Salem, VA	W 15–7	
October 31	Lynchburg	College Field; Salem, VA	W 40–15	
November 8	at William & Mary	Cary Field; Williamsburg, VA	L 0–39	
November 15	Randolph–Macon	College Field; Salem, VA	T 0–0	
November 22	at Emory and Henry	Fullerton Field; Emory, VA	L 0–13	
*Non-conference game
