= 1930 William & Mary Indians football team =

American college football season

1930 William & Mary Indians football

Virginia Conference champion
- Conference: Virginia Conference
- Record: 7–2–1 (5–0 Virginia)
- Head coach: Branch Bocock (3rd season)
- Captain: Jim Murphy

1930 Virginia Conference football standings
	Conf.					Overall
Team	W		L		T	W		L		T
William & Mary $	5	–	0	–	0	7	–	2	–	1
Emory and Henry	3	–	1	–	0	8	–	1	–	1
Randolph–Macon	3	–	2	–	1	3	–	5	–	2
Roanoke	3	–	2	–	2	3	–	4	–	2
Richmond	2	–	2	–	2	2	–	4	–	2
Hampden–Sydney	2	–	3	–	1	2	–	6	–	1
Lynchburg	1	–	4	–	0	1	–	7	–	0
Bridgewater	0	–	5	–	0	0	–	7	–	0
$ – Conference champion

The 1930 William & Mary Indians football team represented the College of William & Mary as a member of the Virginia Conference during the 1930 college football season. Led by third-year head coach Branch Bocock, the Indians compiled an overall record of 7–2–1 with a mark of 5–0 in conference play, winning the Virginia Conference title.

== Schedule ==
Date	Opponent	Site	Result	Attendance	Source
September 27	Guilford*	Cary Field; Williamsburg, VA	W 24–0		
October 4	at Navy*	Thompson Stadium; Annapolis, MD	L 6–19		
October 11	Wofford*	Cary Field; Williamsburg, VA	W 19–0		
October 18	vs. VPI*	City Stadium; Richmond, VA	L 6–7	8,000	
October 25	Bridgewater	Cary Field; Williamsburg, VA	W 81–0		
November 1	at Harvard*	Harvard Stadium; Boston, MA	T 13–13		
November 8	Roanoke	Cary Field; Williamsburg, VA	W 39–0		
November 15	Emory and Henry	Cary Field; Williamsburg, VA	W 27–0		
November 27	at Richmond	City Stadium; Richmond, VA (rivalry)	W 19–0		
December 6	vs. Hampden–Sydney	Richmond, VA	W 13–0	< 1,000	
*Non-conference game
