= New Oxford Review =

Roman Catholic magazine

- Editor: Pieter Vree
- Former editors: Dale Vree
- Categories: Catholicism; Formerly; Anglo-Catholicism
- Frequency: Monthly
- Circulation: 12,000
- Founded: 1977
- Company: New Oxford Review Inc.
- Country: United States
- Based in: Berkeley, California
- Language: English
- Website: newoxfordreview.org
- ISSN: 0149-4244

The New Oxford Review (NOR) is a magazine of traditionalist Catholic cultural and theological commentary. It was founded in 1977 by the American Church Union as an Anglo-Catholic magazine in the Anglican tradition to replace American Church News. It was named for the Oxford Movement of the 1830s and 1840s. In 1983, it officially "converted" to Catholicism.

Originally headquartered in Oakland, California, it is now headquartered in Berkeley, California. It had a paid circulation of 12,000 as of 2020. It has published writing by Walker Percy, Sheldon Vanauken, Thomas Howard, George A. Kelly, Bobby Jindal, Stanley L. Jaki, Peter Kreeft, Avery Dulles, Germain Grisez, James V. Schall, and John Lukacs. Contributing editors have included Robert N. Bellah, L. Brent Bozell Jr., Robert Coles, and Christopher Lasch.

== Views ==
During its earlier history, the magazine championed Pope John Paul II's condemnation of the dissenting Catholic theologian Hans Küng. It supported Bernard Francis Law in his condemnation of the Catholic Common Ground Initiative.

In 2006, George A. Kendall, writing in the conservative Catholic newspaper The Wanderer, questioned the Catholicity of the NOR based on what he viewed as its strident Calvinist tendencies.
