= Tucker Jones =

Tucker Jones may refer to:

- Anthony Tucker-Jones, military historian and intelligence expert
- L. Tucker Jones, head coach for William & Mary College's men's basketball team
