= 1927 Richmond Spiders football team =

American college football season

1927 Richmond Spiders football
- Conference: Virginia Conference
- Record: 4–4–1 (3–1–1 Virginia)
- Head coach: Frank Dobson (14th season)
- Captain: Jesse W. Dillon
- Home stadium: Tate Field

1927 Virginia Conference football standings
	Conf.					Overall
Team	W		L		T	W		L		T
William & Mary $	2	–	0	–	1	4	–	5	–	1
Emory and Henry	1	–	0	–	0	9	–	0	–	0
Richmond	3	–	1	–	1	4	–	4	–	1
Roanoke	2	–	1	–	1	5	–	3	–	1
Randolph–Macon	1	–	2	–	1	2	–	3	–	1
Hampden–Sydney	1	–	3	–	0	4	–	5	–	0
Lynchburg	1	–	4	–	0	1	–	7	–	1
$ – Conference champion

The 1927 Richmond Spiders football team was an American football team that represented the University of Richmond as a member of the Virginia Conference during the 1927 college football season. Led by 14th-year head coach, Frank Dobson, Richmond compiled an overall record of 4–4–1. The team opened the season with a starting lineup at an average weight of just 162 pounds. Richmond played their home games at Tate Field on Mayo Island.

== Schedule ==
Date	Time	Opponent	Site	Result	Attendance	Source
September 24		at VMI*	Lexington, VA (rivalry)	L 0–22		
October 1		at Johns Hopkins*	Homewood Field; Baltimore, MD	W 6–2		
October 8		at Cornell*	Schoellkopf Field; Ithaca, NC	L 0–53	7,000	
October 15		at Duke*	Hanes Field; Durham, NC	L 0–72		
October 21		Randolph–Macon	Tate Field; Richmond, VA	W 12–0		
October 28		Roanoke	Westhampton Field; Richmond, VA	L 6–7		
November 5		at Lynchburg	Lynchburg, VA	W 19–6		
November 12		Hampden–Sydney	Richmond, VA	W 7–6		
November 24	2:30 p.m.	William & Mary	Tate Field; Richmond, VA (rivalry)	T 0–0	9,000	
*Non-conference game
