= 1926–27 William & Mary Indians men's basketball team =

American college basketball season

1926–27 William & Mary Indians men's basketball
- Conference: Independent
- Record: 7–8
- Head coach: J. Wilder Tasker (4th season)
- Home arena: Blow Gymnasium

The 1926–27 William & Mary Indians men's basketball team represented the College of William & Mary in intercollegiate basketball during the 1926–27 season. Under the fourth year of head coach J. Wilder Tasker (who concurrently served as the head football and baseball coach), the team finished the season with a 7–8 record. This was the 22nd season of the collegiate basketball program at William & Mary, whose nickname is now the Tribe. William & Mary played the season as an independent.

== Schedule ==
Date time, TV	Rank^{#}	Opponent^{#}	Result	Record	Site city, state
Regular season
*		Medical College of Virginia	W 18–12	1–0	Blow Gymnasium; Williamsburg, VA
*		Lynchburg College	L 19–22	1–1	Blow Gymnasium; Williamsburg, VA
*		at Washington and Lee	L 25–34	1–2	Lexington, VA
*		at Roanoke College	L 25–32	1–3	Roanoke, VA
*		at Randolph–Macon	W 25–20	2–3	Ashland, VA
1/18/1927*		at Richmond	L 18–20	2–4	Millhiser Gymnasium; Richmond, VA
*		Lynchburg College	W 26–18	3–4	Blow Gymnasium; Williamsburg, VA
*		Stevens Tech	W 30–23	4–4	Blow Gymnasium; Williamsburg, VA
*		Emory & Henry	L 23–34	4–5	Blow Gymnasium; Williamsburg, VA
*		George Washington	L 14–22	4–6	Blow Gymnasium; Williamsburg, VA
*		at Georgetown	L 17–40	4–7	Ryan Gymnasium; Washington, DC
*		at Catholic University	L 19–65	4–8	Washington, DC
*		St. John's (MD)	W 36–29	5–8	Blow Gymnasium; Williamsburg, VA
*		Randolph–Macon	W 27–19	6–8	Blow Gymnasium; Williamsburg, VA
2/26/1927*		Richmond	W 25–14	7–8	Blow Gymnasium; Williamsburg, VA
*Non-conference game. ^{#}Rankings from AP Poll. (#) Tournament seedings in parentheses.
