= 1942 RPI Engineers men's soccer team =

US collegiate soccer team

1942 RPI Engineers men's soccer

ISFA National co-champions (ASHA)
- Conference: Independent
- Record: 5–0–2
- Head coach: Richard Schmelzer (12th season)
- Assistant coach: William Gailey (5th season)
- Home stadium: Anderson Field

The 1942 RPI Engineers men's soccer team represented the Rensselaer Polytechnic Institute during the 1942 ISFA season. The team finished with a 5–0–2 record, their first undefeated season since 1922.

Due to World War II, the Intercollegiate Soccer Football Association (ISFA) and National Soccer Coaches Association of America (NSCAA) did not award a formal champion. The 1942 Engineers team was retroactively named the national soccer co-champion by the American Soccer History Archives, along with Princeton, Springfield, and UMass.

== Schedule ==
Date Time, TV	Rank^{#}	Opponent^{#}	Result	Record	Site City, State
Matches
October 3*		at Hamilton	W 6–0	1–0–0	Love Field; Clinton, NY
October 10*		at Stevens Tech	W 2–1	2–0–0	St. George Cricket Grounds; Staten Island, NY
October 17*		at Williams (MA)	W 4–0	3–0–0	Weston Field; Williamstown, MA
October 24*		Colgate	W 4–0	4–0–0	Anderson Field; Troy, NY
October 31*		Springfield (MA)	T 2–2	4–0–1	Anderson Field; Troy, NY
November 7*		at WPI	W 1–0	5–0–1	WPI Alumni Stadium; Worcester, MA
November 14*		UMass	T 1–1	5–0–2	Anderson Field; Troy, NY
*Non-conference game. ^{#}Rankings from United Soccer Coaches. (#) Tournament seedings in parentheses.
