= 1924–25 William & Mary Indians men's basketball team =

American college basketball season

1924–25 William & Mary Indians men's basketball
- Conference: Independent
- Record: 11–6
- Head coach: J. Wilder Tasker (2nd season)

The 1924–25 William & Mary Indians men's basketball team represented the College of William & Mary in intercollegiate basketball during the 1924–25 season. Under the second year of head coach J. Wilder Tasker (who concurrently served as the head football and baseball coach), the team finished the season with an 11–6 record. This was the 20th season of the collegiate basketball program at William & Mary, whose nickname is now the Tribe. The team played as an independent; William & Mary would not join the Southern Conference until 1936.

== Program notes ==
- At the start of the 1924 season, William & Mary adopted green, gold, and silver as its official colors, switching from orange and black.

== Schedule ==
Date time, TV	Rank^{#}	Opponent^{#}	Result	Record	Site city, state
Regular season
*		Randolph–Macon	W 38–28	1–0	Williamsburg, VA
*		Newport News YMCA	W 29–15	2–0	Williamsburg, VA
*		Virginia Boat Club	W 32–22	3–0	Williamsburg, VA
*		Richmond Blues	L 29–31	3–1	Williamsburg, VA
1/23/1925*		at Richmond	L 33–44	3–2	Millhiser Gymnasium; Richmond, VA
*		Randolph–Macon	W 32–18	4–2	Williamsburg, VA
*		Medical College of Virginia	W 66–22	5–2	Williamsburg, VA
*		Stevens Tech	L 25–31	5–3	Williamsburg, VA
*		Guilford College	W 31–20	6–3	Williamsburg, VA
2/5/1925*		Duke	W 23–15	7–3	Williamsburg, VA
*		Elon College	W 27–16	8–3	Williamsburg, VA
*		Wake Forest	L 24–35	8–4	Williamsburg, VA
2/11/1925*		Duke	L 16–21	8–5	Williamsburg, VA
*		Elon College	W 27–16	9–5	Williamsburg, VA
*		Guilford College	W 24–20	10–5	Williamsburg, VA
*		Bridgewater (VA)	W 43–20	11–5	Williamsburg, VA
2/25/1925*		Richmond	L 26–27	11–6	Williamsburg, VA
*Non-conference game. ^{#}Rankings from AP Poll. (#) Tournament seedings in parentheses.
