= J. Wilder Tasker =

American sports coach (1887–1974)

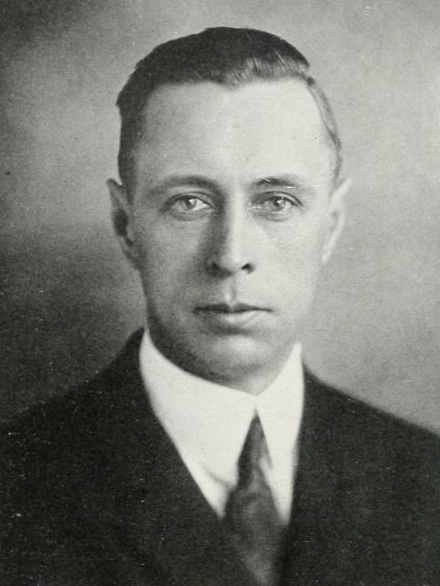
- Tasker pictured in The Colonial Echo 1924, William & Mary yearbook

Biographical details
- Born: June 25, 1887; Richmond, Maine, U.S.
- Died: March 14, 1974 (aged 86); Kilmarnock, Virginia, U.S.

Playing career

Football
- 1907–1911: Syracuse
- 1912–1913: Union (NY)

Coaching career (HC unless noted)

Football
- 1921–1922: Connecticut
- 1924–1927: William & Mary
- 1931–1937: Rutgers

Basketball
- 1921–1923: Connecticut
- 1923–1928: William & Mary

Baseball
- 1922–1923: Connecticut
- 1924–1928: William & Mary
- 1932–1937: Rutgers

Administrative career (AD unless noted)
- 1923–1928: William & Mary

Head coaching record
- Overall: 67–52–11 (football); 66–49 (basketball); 88–108–4 (baseball)

Accomplishments and honors

Championships
- Football; 1 Virginia Conference (1927); 4 Middle Three (1932–1935) Basketball; 1 Virginia Conference (1928)

Joshua Wilder Tasker (June 25, 1887 – March 14, 1974) was an American football, basketball, and baseball coach. He served as the head football coach at Connecticut Agricultural College—now known as the University of Connecticut—from 1921 to 1922, the College of William & Mary from 1923 to 1927, and Rutgers University from 1931 to 1937, compiling a career college football record of 67–52–11. Wilder was also the head basketball coach at Connecticut from 1921 to 1923 and William & Mary from 1923 to 1928, tallying a career college basketball mark of 66–49. In addition he served as the head baseball coach at Connecticut (1922–1923), William & Mary (1924–1928), and Rutgers (1932–1937), amassing a career college baseball record of 88–108–4.

== Coaching career ==
Tasker became athletic coach at Connecticut Agricultural College—now known as the University of Connecticut—in 1921. He resigned as coach at Connecticut in January 1923. Connecticut's athletic director, Roy J. Guyer, took over coaching of the Connecticut Aggies men's basketball team.

In March 1923, Tasker was hired at athletic director and coach at the College of William & Mary in Williamsburg, Virginia.

== Later life and death ==
After leaving from coaching, Tasker ran an insurance business in Orange, New Jersey. He retired in the 1960s and moved to Kilmarnock, Virginia, where he died at his home on March 14, 1974.

== Head coaching record ==
=== Football ===
Year	Team	Overall	Conference	Standing	Bowl/playoffs
Connecticut Aggies (Athletic League of New England State Colleges) (1921–1922)
1921	Connecticut	3–2–3	0–2		
1922	Connecticut	2–6–1	0–3		
Connecticut:		5–8–4	0–5		
William & Mary Indians (Independent) (1923–1926)
1923	William & Mary	7–3			
1924	William & Mary	5–2–1			
1925	William & Mary	7–4			
1926	William & Mary	7–3			
William & Mary Indians (Virginia Conference) (1927)
1927	William & Mary	4–5–1	2–0–1	1st	
William and Mary:		30–17–2	2–0–1		
Rutgers Queensmen (Middle Three Conference) (1931–1937)
1931	Rutgers	4–3–1	1–1	2nd	
1932	Rutgers	6–3–1	2–0	1st	
1933	Rutgers	6–3–1	2–0	1st	
1934	Rutgers	5–3–1	2–0	1st	
1935	Rutgers	4–5	2–0	1st	
1936	Rutgers	1–6–1	0–1	T–2nd	
1937	Rutgers	5–4	1–1	2nd	
Rutgers:		31–27–5	10–3		
Total:		66–52–11			
National championship Conference title Conference division title or championship game berth

=== Basketball ===
Record table
Season	Team	Overall	Conference	Standing	Postseason
Connecticut Aggies (Athletic League of New England State Colleges) (1921–1923)
1921–22	Connecticut	15–4	6–1		
1922–23	Connecticut	0–1 (Note: Tasker resigned in January 1923 after the first game of the season, before the start of conference play. Roy J. Guyer coached the remainder of the season. Connecticut finished 8–7 overall and 2–1 in conference play)	0–0		
Connecticut:		15–5	6–1		
William & Mary Indians (Virginia Conference) (1923–1928)
1923–24	William & Mary	8–16	3–8		
1924–25	William & Mary	13–6	7–2		
1925–26	William & Mary	8–9	3–3		
1926–27	William & Mary	7–8	4–4		
1927–28	William & Mary	15–5	9–0	1st	
William & Mary:		51–44	26–17		
Total:		66–49			
National champion Postseason invitational champion Conference regular season champion Conference regular season and conference tournament champion Division regular season champion Division regular season and conference tournament champion Conference tournament champion

=== Baseball ===
The following table depicts Tasker's record as head baseball coach at Connecticut.

Record table
Season	Team	Overall	Conference	Standing	Postseason
Connecticut Aggies (1922–1923)
1922	Connecticut	8–9			
1923	Connecticut	4–9			
Total:		12–18			
