= John Kellison =

American athlete and coach (1886–1971)

- Photo taken while serving as the athletic director at Marietta College

Biographical details
- Born: November 3, 1886; Buckeye, West Virginia, U.S.
- Died: May 7, 1971 (aged 84); Marlinton, West Virginia, U.S.

Playing career

Football
- 1914–1915: West Virginia Wesleyan
- 1915–1921: Canton Bulldogs
- 1922: Toledo Maroons
- Positions: Center, tackle

Coaching career (HC unless noted)

Football
- 1916–1917: West Virginia Wesleyan (assistant)
- 1919: Wheeling HS (WV)
- 1921–1922: Washington & Jefferson (assistant)
- 1923–1928: Virginia (assistant)
- 1929–1930: William & Mary (line)
- 1931–1934: William & Mary
- 1939: Richmond (assistant)
- 1940: VPI (assistant)
- 1941–1950: Philadelphia Eagles (assistant)
- 1952: Washington and Lee (assistant)
- 1955: Chicago Cardinals (line)
- 1956: Chicago Cardinals (assistant)

Basketball
- 1929–1934: William & Mary
- 1937–1939: William & Mary

Baseball
- 1921: Marietta
- 1931–1934: William & Mary
- 1938: William & Mary

Administrative career (AD unless noted)
- 1920–1921: Marietta
- 1921–?: Washington & Jefferson

Head coaching record
- Overall: 21–17–2 (college football); 71–52 (college basketball); 63–34 (college baseball)

Accomplishments and honors

Championships
- Football; 2 Virginia Conference (1933–1934) Basketball; 4 Virginia Conference (1930–1933)

John Snowden Kellison (November 3, 1886 – May 7, 1971) was a professional football player in the National Football League with the Canton Bulldogs and the Toledo Maroons. He also was an athletic director at Marietta College as well as Washington & Jefferson College. He later became the head coach for William and Mary's football and basketball teams. In the 1940s he was an assistant coach, under Greasy Neale, for the Philadelphia Eagles.

== Playing career ==
John joined the Bulldogs in 1915 along with Greasy Neale, whom Kellison served under as an assistant coach at West Virginia Wesleyan. When Neale and Kellison first played with Bulldogs, they assumed aliases for fear they’d be fired from their coaching jobs if it came out they were involved with pro football - at the time, most college presidents looked down upon the professional game. So for their first few years with the Bulldogs, Kellison took the name "Keller", while Neale took the name "Foster". When a delegation from West Virginia Wesleyan made surprise visit to a Bulldogs game in 1916 to investigate allegations of college football personnel playing professionally, Neale, Kellison and Pete Calac all got wind of the news and briefly left the team.

During his time in Canton Kellison and the Bulldogs won three Ohio League championships, in 1916, 1917 and 1919.

== Coaching and administrative career ==
After his playing days, Kellison became the athletic director at Marietta College in Marietta, Ohio. He resigned from the position at Marietta to become the athletic director at Washington & Jefferson College in 1921. He later became the head coach for the William & Mary Tribe men's basketball team from 1929 to 1934 and again from 1937 to 1939.

Kellison was also the head coach for the William & Mary football team from 1931 to 1934, compiling a 21–17–2 record. In 1942 John was made an assistant coach, by Neale, for the Philadelphia Eagles. He was fired along with Neale after the 1950 season. Kellison became an assistant football coach for Washington & Lee in 1952.

== Head coaching record ==
=== Football ===
Year	Team	Overall	Conference	Standing	Bowl/playoffs
William & Mary Indians (Virginia Conference) (1931–1934)
1931	William & Mary	5–2–2	4–1	2nd	
1932	William & Mary	8–4	4–1	2nd	
1933	William & Mary	6–5	2–1	T–1st	
1934	William & Mary	2–6	2–1	T–1st	
William & Mary:		21–17–2	12–4		
Total:		21–17–2			
National championship Conference title Conference division title or championship game berth

=== Basketball ===
Record table
Season	Team	Overall	Conference	Standing	Postseason
William & Mary Indians (Virginia Conference) (1929–1934)
1929–30	William & Mary	17–6	11–1	1st	
1930–31	William & Mary	13–4	10–1	1st	
1931–32	William & Mary	13–6	11–1	1st	
1932–33	William & Mary	13–5	11–0	1st	
1933–34	William & Mary	4–9	2–4		
William & Mary Indians (Southern Conference) (1937–1939)
1937–38	William & Mary	2–10	0–9	15th	
1938–39	William & Mary	9–12	4–9	12th	
William & Mary:		71–52	49–25		
Total:		71–52			
National champion Postseason invitational champion Conference regular season champion Conference regular season and conference tournament champion Division regular season champion Division regular season and conference tournament champion Conference tournament champion
