= Sheldon Vanauken =

American journalist and academic

- Born: August 4, 1914; Auburn, Indiana
- Died: October 18, 1996 (aged 82)

Sheldon Vanauken (/vəˈnɔːkən/; August 4, 1914 – October 18, 1996) was an American author, best known for his autobiographical book A Severe Mercy (1977), which recounts his and his wife's friendship with C. S. Lewis, their conversion to Christianity, and dealing with tragedy. He published a sequel in 1985 titled Under the Mercy.

== Early life ==
Vanauken was born Sheldon Frank Van Auken in Auburn, Indiana, the elder of two sons of a wealthy attorney, (Robert) Glenn Vanauken, and his wife Grace Merle (Hanselman) Vanauken. His parents were of German and Dutch descent, their grandparents having migrated to Indiana from eastern Pennsylvania and Columbiana County, Ohio. Vanauken was named for his two grandfathers, Frank Vanauken, a teacher, and Sheldon Fitch Hanselman, an attorney. His father was a self-made lawyer who became influential in local politics, served as a state senator, and owned the Indiana Broadcasting Company.

Vanauken grew up at the family home, "Glenmerle", (a composite of his parents' middle names) located on the south side of Carmel, Indiana. He attended Culver Military Academy, Staunton Military Academy and, for one year, Miami Military Academy in Florida. He earned his undergraduate degree from Wabash College in 1938, where he was a member of Phi Gamma Delta fraternity, and later attended Yale and Oxford Universities. He was interested in flying, and had his own small plane at Wabash which his father bought for him.

While at college, he dropped the "Frank" from his name. In later life, he was known to friends simply as "Van".

== Marriage and religious conversion ==
Van met Jean "Davy" Palmer Davis during his junior year at Wabash. She was born in Hackensack, New Jersey, on July 24, 1914, the daughter of Reverend Staley Franklin Davis (1877–1926), a prominent Methodist minister, and his wife Helen Larter (Fredericks) Davis (1885–1950), a teacher. Staley Davis was a native of Pataskala, Ohio, and Helen Davis of Newark, NJ. Davy's sister Helen Marjorie (1908–1991) was six years older and her brother Donald three years younger.

When Davy was fourteen years old, two years after her father's death, she became pregnant by an unknown man. She gave up the baby girl, whom she called Marion, for adoption but never forgot her.

Davy had been educated at Troy Conference Academy, a Vermont boarding school, but had to withdraw due to lack of funds after her father's death. After finishing school, she worked in New York City for a time before moving to Indianapolis to enter Butler University. Shortly after beginning her studies there, she met Sheldon Vanauken at the Indianapolis department store where she worked hand-tinting photographs to earn her tuition.

Van and Davy soon fell deeply in love and made a vow they called the "Shining Barrier". In brief, they promised to share everything in life, including all their interests, friends, and work, in order to tie themselves so closely together that nothing could ever separate them. Their devotion to this idea was so complete that they decided never to have children, as they felt that motherhood would be an experience which could not be shared equally. Both were agnostics at this time.

They were married secretly (due, according to A Severe Mercy, to Van's father's objection to early marriages) on October 1, 1937, ten months after they met. They apparently kept their secret for some years, as they are both listed as "single" in the 1940 census, and are living apart—Van with his parents in DeKalb County, and Davy in a boarding house in Indianapolis, where she is listed as working as a bank teller.

The couple announced their marriage to Van's family in the winter of 1940. Shortly after, Van was called up for naval duty and stationed at Pearl Harbor. Davy joined him there some months later and took a job working with the navy. Van's father died suddenly on July 31, 1943, during World War II. Vanauken inherited a substantial amount of money and used some of it to have a boat built which they named Grey Goose, for the bird which remains true to one mate throughout life. Following Van's studies in history at Yale, from which he received a master's degree in 1948, and a stint in the Navy stationed in Hawaii, the young couple spent considerable time sailing Grey Goose around Chesapeake Bay, the Florida Keys, and the Caribbean.

In 1948, Vanauken took a teaching position at Lynchburg College. However, when postwar travel to Europe became possible again, he took a sabbatical and he and Davy moved to England so that he could study at Oxford University (where he was awarded a BLitt in 1957). While they were there, they became friends with a circle of young Christian students. Eventually, Davy "crossed the room" to become a devout Anglican Christian herself; she had reexamined her life and views on the nature of sin after a thwarted attempt by a stranger to assault her. Her conversion was also partly owing to the friendship and influence of C. S. Lewis, who was teaching at Oxford at the time. In the spirit of the "Shining Barrier", Van followed her, but with less conviction and even with some resentment.

Upon their return to Lynchburg, Van continued teaching history and literature at Lynchburg College. They joined a local congregation and explored their faith further. It was eventually to be tested severely. Davy contracted a virus which attacked her liver, possibly picked up during their years of travel. At the time of her diagnosis in the summer of 1954, Vanauken had just resigned to accept a job offer from his alma mater, Wabash College, but asked Lynchburg to rehire him in order to stay near Davy's doctors, which they did. Davy died of her illness soon after, at Virginia Baptist Hospital in Lynchburg on January 17, 1955. She was 40 years old, and they had been married for over seventeen years.

A great part of A Severe Mercy concerns how Van came to grips with losing his beloved wife with the help of his increasing faith and his correspondence with Lewis, who soon was to face the loss of his own terminally ill wife. Vanauken later called the "Shining Barrier" he and Davy had created a "pagan love, invaded by Christ." He never remarried, and eventually converted to Roman Catholicism in 1981.

A Severe Mercy won a National Book Award in the one-year category Religion/Inspiration. (Note: This was the award for paperback Religion/Inspiration. From 1980 to 1983 in National Book Award history there were dual awards for hardcover and paperback books in many categories, including several nonfiction subcategories. Most of the paperback award-winners were reprints, including this one.)

== Later life ==
Many years after Davy's death, Vanauken went looking for the daughter Davy had given up for adoption as a young girl. The story of his search, their 1988 meeting, and how it affected his beliefs is related in The Little Lost Marion and Other Mercies, which was written shortly before his death. "Marion", who had been given another name by her adoptive parents, had become a nurse and had three children with her husband, a physician.

Van continued to teach at Lynchburg College to the end of his career. In the 1960s, he was an outspoken critic of the Vietnam War and a supporter of the feminist movement, although he eventually abandoned the latter in the belief that it had become too radical. The Oxford English Dictionary credits him as one of the earliest users of the word sexist, in the pamphlet "Freedom for Movement Girls Now", published by the Southern Student Organizing Committee (a progressive student organization in the southern United States), wherein he was active during the 1960s. He is sometimes falsely claimed to have coined the word sexism, but in fact it was most likely coined by Pauline M. Leet, and first appeared in print in Caroline Bird's speech "On Being Born Female", which was published on November 15, 1968, in Vital Speeches of the Day. He was also a candidate for public office on the Peace and Freedom Party ticket in Virginia.

After his conversion to Catholicism, he was a contributing editor of the New Oxford Review and a frequent contributor to Crisis and Southern Partisan magazines, as well as to other periodicals and newspapers. He expressed sympathy for the Confederacy in his 1985 book, The Glittering Illusion, although he was always critical of racism and slavery.

He remained an ardent Anglophile all his life, and often used British spelling and expressions in his writing.

Sheldon Vanauken died of lung cancer on October 28, 1996. His ashes were scattered in the churchyard of St. Stephen's Episcopal Church in Forest, Virginia, as those of his wife Davy had been forty years previously. Some were also scattered in a churchyard in Binsey near Oxford, where a friend, Edmund Dews, had scattered some of Davy's ashes after her death. (Lewis' letter agreeing to scatter the ashes was lost in the mail, so Vanauken asked Edmund to do it.)

A movie version of A Severe Mercy was in development in 2013 by Origin Entertainment, who had optioned the film rights in late 2012.

== Works ==
- Encounter With Light (booklet, 1960)
- A Severe Mercy (1977)
- Gateway to Heaven (novel, 1980)
- Under the Mercy (1985)
- The Glittering Illusion: English Sympathy for the Southern Confederacy (1985)
- Mercies: Collected Poems (1988)
- The Little Lost Marion and Other Mercies (1996)
