= 1922–23 Connecticut Aggies men's basketball team =

American college basketball season

1922–23 Connecticut Aggies men's basketball
- Conference: Athletic League of New England State Colleges
- Record: 8–7 (2–1 ALNESC)
- Head coach: J. Wilder Tasker (2nd year) (1st season); Roy J. Guyer
- Home arena: Hawley Armory

The 1922–23 Connecticut Aggies men's basketball team represented Connecticut Agricultural College, now the University of Connecticut, in the 1922–23 collegiate men's basketball season. The Aggies completed the season with an 8–7 overall record. The Aggies were members of the Athletic League of New England State Colleges, where they ended the season with a 2–1 record. The Aggies played their home games at Hawley Armory in Storrs, Connecticut, and were led by second-year head coach J. Wilder Tasker and first-year head coach Roy J. Guyer.

== Schedule ==
Date time, TV	Rank^{#}	Opponent^{#}	Result	Record	Site (attendance) city, state
Regular Season
*		Army	L 19–52	0–1	
*		Trinity	W 35–23	1–1	
		Rhode Island	W 41–20	2–1 (1–0)	
*		Springfield	L 24–35	2–2	
*		Harvard	W 39–37	3–2	
		New Hampshire	W 27–22	4–2 (2–0)	
*		Springfield	L 18–36	4–3	
*		Holy Cross	W 31–22	5–3	
*		Wesleyan	L 16–30	5–4	
*		Brown	L 27–33	5–5	
		Rhode Island	L 29–30	5–6 (2–1)	
*		Trinity	W 30–26	6–6	
*		St. Michael’s	L 27–29	6–7	
*		Albany Law	W 34–25	7–7	
*		Albany Law	W 32–13	8–7	
*Non-conference game. ^{#}Rankings from AP Poll. (#) Tournament seedings in parentheses. All times are in Eastern Time.

Schedule Source:
