= 1921–22 Connecticut Aggies men's basketball team =

American college basketball season

1921–22 Connecticut Aggies men's basketball
- Conference: Athletic League of New England State Colleges
- Record: 15–4 (6–1 ALNESC)
- Head coach: J. Wilder Tasker (1st season)
- Home arena: Hawley Armory

The 1921–22 Connecticut Aggies men's basketball team represented Connecticut Agricultural College, now the University of Connecticut, in the 1921–22 collegiate men's basketball season. The Aggies completed the season with a 15–4 overall record. The Aggies were members of the Athletic League of New England State Colleges, where they ended the season with a 6–1 record. The Aggies played their home games at Hawley Armory in Storrs, Connecticut, and were led by first-year head coach J. Wilder Tasker.

== Schedule ==
Date time, TV	Rank^{#}	Opponent^{#}	Result	Record	Site (attendance) city, state
Regular Season
*		Harvard	W 38–33	1–0	
*		Army	W 33–31	2–0	
*		Brown	W 29–23	3–0	
*		Lebanon Valley	W 40–29	4–0	
*		Wesleyan	L 19–20	4–1	
		Rhode Island	W 19–18	5–1 (1–0)	
		Massachusetts	W 31–13	6–1 (2–0)	
*		Tufts	W 27–20	7–1	
		New Hampshire	W 35–30	8–1 (3–0)	
*		Tufts	W 47–35	9–1	
		Rhode Island	W 41–18	10–1 (4–0)	
*		Springfield	W 24–23	11–1	
*		Trinity	L 19–21	11–2	
		Massachusetts	L 17–30	11–3 (4–1)	
*		Springfield	L 23–46	11–4	
		Maine	W 22–16	12–4 (5–1)	
*		Worcester	W 29–26	13–4	
		New Hampshire	W 26–23	14–4 (6–1)	
*		Trinity	W 24–17	15–4	
*Non-conference game. ^{#}Rankings from AP Poll. (#) Tournament seedings in parentheses. All times are in Eastern Time.

Schedule Source:
