= 1925–26 William & Mary Indians men's basketball team =

American college basketball season

1925–26 William & Mary Indians men's basketball
- Conference: Independent
- Record: 9–8
- Head coach: J. Wilder Tasker (3rd season)
- Home arena: Blow Gymnasium

The 1925–26 William & Mary Indians men's basketball team represented the College of William & Mary in intercollegiate basketball during the 1925–26 season. Under the third year of head coach J. Wilder Tasker (who concurrently served as the head football and baseball coach), the team finished the season with a 9–8 record. This was the 21st season of the collegiate basketball program at William & Mary, whose nickname is now the Tribe.

William & Mary finished construction in 1925 on Blow Gymnasium, where the men's basketball team would play until the opening of William & Mary Hall in 1970.

== Schedule ==
Date time, TV	Rank^{#}	Opponent^{#}	Result	Record	Site city, state
Regular season
*		Medical College of Virginia	W 36–21	1–0	Blow Gymnasium; Williamsburg, VA
*		Fort Monroe	W 43–30	2–0	Blow Gymnasium; Williamsburg, VA
*		Union Theological Institute	W 41–16	3–0	Blow Gymnasium; Williamsburg, VA
*		Wake Forest	L 19–37	3–1	Blow Gymnasium; Williamsburg, VA
1/15/1925*		Richmond	L 19–30	3–2	Blow Gymnasium; Williamsburg, VA
*		St. John's (MD)	W 29–18	4–2	Blow Gymnasium; Williamsburg, VA
*		High Point College	L 24–25	4–3	Blow Gymnasium; Williamsburg, VA
*		Stevens Tech	L 19–39	4–4	Blow Gymnasium; Williamsburg, VA
*		Roanoke College	W 35–34	5–4	Blow Gymnasium; Williamsburg, VA
*		St. John's (MD)	L 21–36	5–5	Blow Gymnasium; Williamsburg, VA
*		Catholic University	L 8–57	5–6	Blow Gymnasium; Williamsburg, VA
*		George Washington	L 31–39	5–7	Blow Gymnasium; Williamsburg, VA
*		at Georgetown	W 26–25	6–7	Ryan Gymnasium; Washington, DC
*		Guilford College	W 24–23	7–7	Blow Gymnasium; Williamsburg, VA
3/2/1925*		Richmond	L 23–30	7–8	Blow Gymnasium; Williamsburg, VA
*		Randolph–Macon	W 23–17	8–8	Blow Gymnasium; Williamsburg, VA
*		Randolph–Macon	W 29–17	9–8	Blow Gymnasium; Williamsburg, VA
*Non-conference game. ^{#}Rankings from AP Poll. (#) Tournament seedings in parentheses.
