= Alison Morrison-Shetlar =

Scottish academic administrator and marine biologist

11th President of University of Lynchburg
- Incumbent
- Assumed office August 2020
- Preceded by: Kenneth R. Garren

Personal details
- Born: Scotland, UK
- Education: Dundee Institute of Technology

Alison Morrison-Shetlar is a Scottish academic administrator and marine molecular biologist. She served as the 11th president of the University of Lynchburg from 2020 until her retirement in 2026. Previously, she was the interim chancellor of Western Carolina University, dean of the College of Arts and Sciences at Elon University, and held administrative and faculty positions at the University of Central Florida and Georgia Southern University.

== Early life and education ==
Morrison-Shetlar was raised on the Isle of Bute in Scotland. She earned a bachelor's degree in biology and chemistry and a doctorate in biomedical science from Dundee Institute of Technology. She conducted postdoctoral research in London. She later received a management and leadership in higher education certificate from the Harvard Graduate School of Education.

== Career ==
=== Early career ===
Morrison-Shetlar began her career as a research scientist at the Kennedy Institute for Rheumatology in London, where she worked from 1984 to 1988. In 1989, she moved to Germany and became a senior scientist at the Max-Planck Institute in Dortmund, where she established and served as head of the molecular biology department. She taught courses in molecular biology and physiology at Ruhr University Bochum.

Her scientific research focused on the field of marine molecular biology. Her areas of expertise are in the molecular, biochemical, and immunological study of marine organisms such as the dogfish shark, mummichog, and longhorn sculpin.

=== Academic career in the United States ===
In 1993, Morrison-Shetlar relocated to the United States, initially serving as a visiting faculty member and researcher at Wesleyan University and Trinity College. Using physiological, molecular, and biochemical techniques, she was able to clone, sequence, and compare isoforms of the sodium-hydrogen transport protein. Most of this research took place at Mount Desert Island Biological Laboratory.

She joined the biology faculty at Georgia Southern University in 1995 and was later appointed director of the university's Center for Excellence in Teaching, a role she held until 2002. During her time there, she received excellence in teaching awards in 1997 and 2001, was named a distinguished professor of teaching and learning by the Georgia Board of Regents for two consecutive years (1998 to 1999 and 1999 to 2000), and was nominated for the U.S. Professor of the Year award in 1999 and 2000.

Throughout her career, she has co-authored a book titled Teaching Creatively: Ideas in Action and published peer-reviewed articles on molecular biology and teaching. She was awarded over $4.5 million in external grant funding for research and has been a co-investigator on 12 National Science Foundation (NSF) grants, receiving nearly $3.5 million in funding. As assistant director for Project Kaleidoscope, she co-led work on a $1.3 million NSF grant to increase student engagement in STEM disciplines.

=== University leadership ===
In 2002, Morrison-Shetlar joined the University of Central Florida (UCF) as director of the Faculty Center for Teaching and Learning. She was promoted to dean of undergraduate studies in 2006 and assumed the additional duties of vice provost in 2008. At UCF, she oversaw 11 offices and programs, including undergraduate research and the McNair Program. She also founded and chaired the Florida Faculty Development Consortium and served as co-chair of the Southern Regional Faculty Instruction and Development Consortium from 2004 to 2007.

She was named dean of Elon College, the College of Arts and Sciences, at Elon University in March 2010 and served in that capacity from June 2010 until 2014.

She joined Western Carolina University (WCU) in January 2014 as provost, vice chancellor of academic affairs, and a tenured professor of biology. While provost, she was "integrally involved in the successful launch" of the Catamount School, the university's laboratory school. On November 28, 2017, she was named acting chancellor of WCU, effective January 1, 2018, following chancellor David O. Belcher's decision to take a medical leave.

In August 2020, Morrison-Shetlar became the 11th president of the University of Lynchburg. Her tenure began during the COVID-19 pandemic in Virginia, and her administration partnered with Centra Health to navigate health policies. During her presidency, the university faced a $12 million deficit, leading to program cuts and staff layoffs in May 2024. In December 2024, the university's accreditor issued a warning for non-compliance with standards related to financial responsibility and administrative effectiveness. In September 2025, she announced she would retire in June 2026 at the end of her second three-year contract.
