= 1923–24 William & Mary Indians men's basketball team =

American college basketball season

1923–24 William & Mary Indians men's basketball
- Conference: Independent
- Record: 7–13
- Head coach: J. Wilder Tasker (1st season)

The 1923–24 William & Mary Indians men's basketball team represented the College of William & Mary in intercollegiate basketball during the 1923–24 season. Under the first year of head coach J. Wilder Tasker (who concurrently served as the head football coach), the team finished the season with a 7–13 record. This was the 19th season of the collegiate basketball program at William & Mary, whose nickname is now the Tribe. The team played as an independent; William & Mary did not join the Southern Conference until 1936. Furthermore, this was William & Mary's first twenty-game season.

== Schedule ==
Date time, TV	Rank^{#}	Opponent^{#}	Result	Record	Site city, state
Regular season
*		Fort Eustis	W 31–7	1–0	Williamsburg, VA
*		Newport News YMCA	W 29–15	2–0	Williamsburg, VA
*		Medical College of Virginia	W 25–13	3–0	Williamsburg, VA
*		Randolph–Macon	W 47–15	4–0	Williamsburg, VA
*		Wake Forest	L 28–30	4–1	Williamsburg, VA
*		Union Theological Seminary	L 24–26	4–2	Williamsburg, VA
*		Richmond Blues	L 38–43	4–3	Williamsburg, VA
*		Virginia	W 25–22	5–3	Williamsburg, VA
*		at Richmond	L 20–32	5–4	Millhiser Gymnasium; Richmond, VA
*		at VMI	L 20–38	5–5	Lexington, VA
*		at Washington & Lee	L 16–39	5–6	Lexington, VA
*		at VPI	L 29–30	5–7	Blacksburg, VA
*		at Roanoke College	L 27–47	5–8	Roanoke, VA
*		at Lynchburg College	L 27–29	5–9	Lynchburg, VA
*		at Norfolk Naval Base	W 25–18	6–9	Norfolk, VA
*		Wake Forest	L 30–38	6–10	Williamsburg, VA
*		at Guilford College	L 31–35	6–11	Greensboro, NC
*		at Elon College	W 25–10	7–11	Elon, NC
*		at Greensboro YMCA	L 30–39	7–12	Greensboro, NC
*		at North Carolina	L 16–54	7–13	Bynum Gymnasium; Chapel Hill, NC
*Non-conference game. ^{#}Rankings from AP Poll. (#) Tournament seedings in parentheses.
