= 1927 William & Mary Indians football team =

American college football season

1927 William & Mary Indians football

Virginia Conference champion
- Conference: Virginia Conference
- Record: 4–5–1 (2–0–1 Virginia)
- Head coach: J. Wilder Tasker (5th season)
- Captain: Meb Davis

1927 Virginia Conference football standings
	Conf.					Overall
Team	W		L		T	W		L		T
William & Mary $	2	–	0	–	1	4	–	5	–	1
Emory and Henry	1	–	0	–	0	9	–	0	–	0
Richmond	3	–	1	–	1	4	–	4	–	1
Roanoke	2	–	1	–	1	5	–	3	–	1
Randolph–Macon	1	–	2	–	1	2	–	3	–	1
Hampden–Sydney	1	–	3	–	0	4	–	5	–	0
Lynchburg	1	–	4	–	0	1	–	7	–	1
$ – Conference champion

The 1927 William & Mary Indians football team represented the College of William & Mary as a member of the Virginia Conference during the 1927 college football season. Led by J. Wilder Tasker in his fifth and final year as head coach, the Indians compiled an overall record of 4–5–1 with a mark of 2–0–1 in conference play, winning the Virginia Conference title.

== Schedule ==
Date	Time	Opponent	Site	Result	Attendance	Source
September 24		Catholic University*	Williamsburg, VA	L 0–12		
October 1		at Syracuse*	Archbold Stadium; Syracuse, NY	L 0–18		
October 8		Lenoir–Rhyne*	Williamsburg, VA	W 19–0		
October 15		vs. Quantico Marines*	Newport News, VA	L 14–20		
October 22		Concord State*	Williamsburg, VA	W 13–7		
October 29		at Princeton*	Palmer Stadium; Princeton, NJ	L 7–35		
November 5		vs. Chattanooga*	League Park; Norfolk, VA	L 7–12	3,000	
November 11		at Roanoke	Maher Field; Roanoke, VA	W 18–7	5,000	
November 19		vs. Hampden–Sydney	Norfolk, VA	W 33–7		
November 24	2:30 p.m.	at Richmond	Tate Field; Richmond, VA (rivalry)	T 0–0	9,000	
*Non-conference game; All times are in Eastern time
