= L. Tucker Jones =

American basketball coach (1888–1942)

Biographical details
- Born: August 16, 1888; Norfolk, Virginia, U.S.
- Died: December 1, 1942 (aged 54); Richmond, Virginia, U.S.
- Education: College of William and Mary

Coaching career (HC unless noted)
- 1928–1929: William & Mary

Head coaching record
- Overall: 9–11

Leigh Tucker Jones (August 16, 1888 – December 1, 1942) was the head coach for William & Mary College's men's basketball team for the 1928–29 season. In his sole season as coach he guided the Indians (now Tribe) to a 9–11 record.

== Early life ==
Leigh Tucker Jones was born to William Henry Jones in Norfolk, Virginia. He graduated from the College of William and Mary. He attended New York University, Columbia University and the Medical College of Virginia. He was a member of Kappa Alpha, Omicron Delta Kappa and Pi Mu.

== Career ==
In 1910, Jones instituted the first physical education department to Virginia. He coached a range of sports, including fencing. He brought the sport of fencing to the William & Mary. He was football and track coach at John Marshall High School. He taught classes at the University of Virginia, Columbia University and St. John's University.

== Personal life ==
Jones married May Cecelia Leman of New York in 1909. He had one daughter, Mrs. Gustave Marinus Heiss.

Jones died of pneumonia on December 1, 1942, at a hospital in Richmond. He was buried in Cedar Grove Cemetery.

== Head coaching record ==
Record table
Season	Team	Overall	Conference	Standing	Postseason
William & Mary Indians (Virginia Conference) (1928–1929)
1928–29	William & Mary	9–11	6–5	4th	
William & Mary:		9–11	6–5		
Total:		9–11			
