= A Severe Mercy =

1977 autobiographical book

- First edition
- Author: Sheldon Vanauken
- Language: English
- Publisher: Harper & Row
- Publication date: 1977
- Publication place: United States
- Media type: Print (hardcover)
- Pages: 240
- Followed by: Under the Mercy (1985)

A Severe Mercy is an autobiographical book by Sheldon Vanauken, relating the author's relationship with his wife, their friendship with C. S. Lewis, conversion to Christianity, and subsequent tragedy. It was first published in 1977. The book is strongly influenced, at least stylistically, by the Evelyn Waugh novel Brideshead Revisited. It was followed by a sequel, Under the Mercy, first published in 1985.

The book is, in a sense, made up of two distinct parts: the first chronicles the love story of Vanauken and his wife, a love which he refers to as pagan. The couple pledged always to put their love before all else ('The Shining Barrier'), and the intensity of their devotion to one another and their exclusivity makes up the early chapters. However, Vanauken (or "Van") and his wife Jean Davis (or "Davy") explore Christianity and are gradually converted, and the primacy of their love for one another comes into question for both of them—though Vanauken's conversion is somewhat slower and more reluctant.

His analysis is aided by a correspondence with C.S. Lewis, then an Oxford Don, and some of Lewis's letters are reprinted in the book. Vanauken's circle of Oxford acquaintances includes other recognizable names as well, including Catholic priest Julian Stead, who went on to author books of religious poetry and a noted text on St. Benedict's rule of life.

A Severe Mercy is undoubtedly Vanauken's best known and most successful book. However, his first published work was a small booklet called "Encounter with Light", written about 1960 and available only from Wheaton College in Illinois today. Vanauken's only novel, Gateway to Heaven, was published by Harper & Row in 1980.

A Severe Mercy won a Gold Medallion Award from the Evangelical Christian Publishers Association in 1977.

A Severe Mercy won a 1980 U.S. National Book Award in the one-year category Religion/Inspiration. (Note: This was the award for paperback Religion/Inspiration. From 1980 to 1983 in National Book Award history there were dual awards for hardcover and paperback books in many categories, including several nonfiction subcategories. Most of the paperback award-winners were reprints, including this one.)

The 1985 sequel Under the Mercy spans many years after the death of Vanauken's wife, years during which he first fell away from "the obedience" and then returned and eventually converted to Catholicism.

In May 2013, Origin Entertainment purchased the rights to begin development on the screenplay by Barbara Nicolosi (Fatima (2020)) with plans of taking the film into production in 2021 .
