= William Hall Walker Gymnasium =

- U.S. National Register of Historic Places
- New Jersey Register of Historic Places
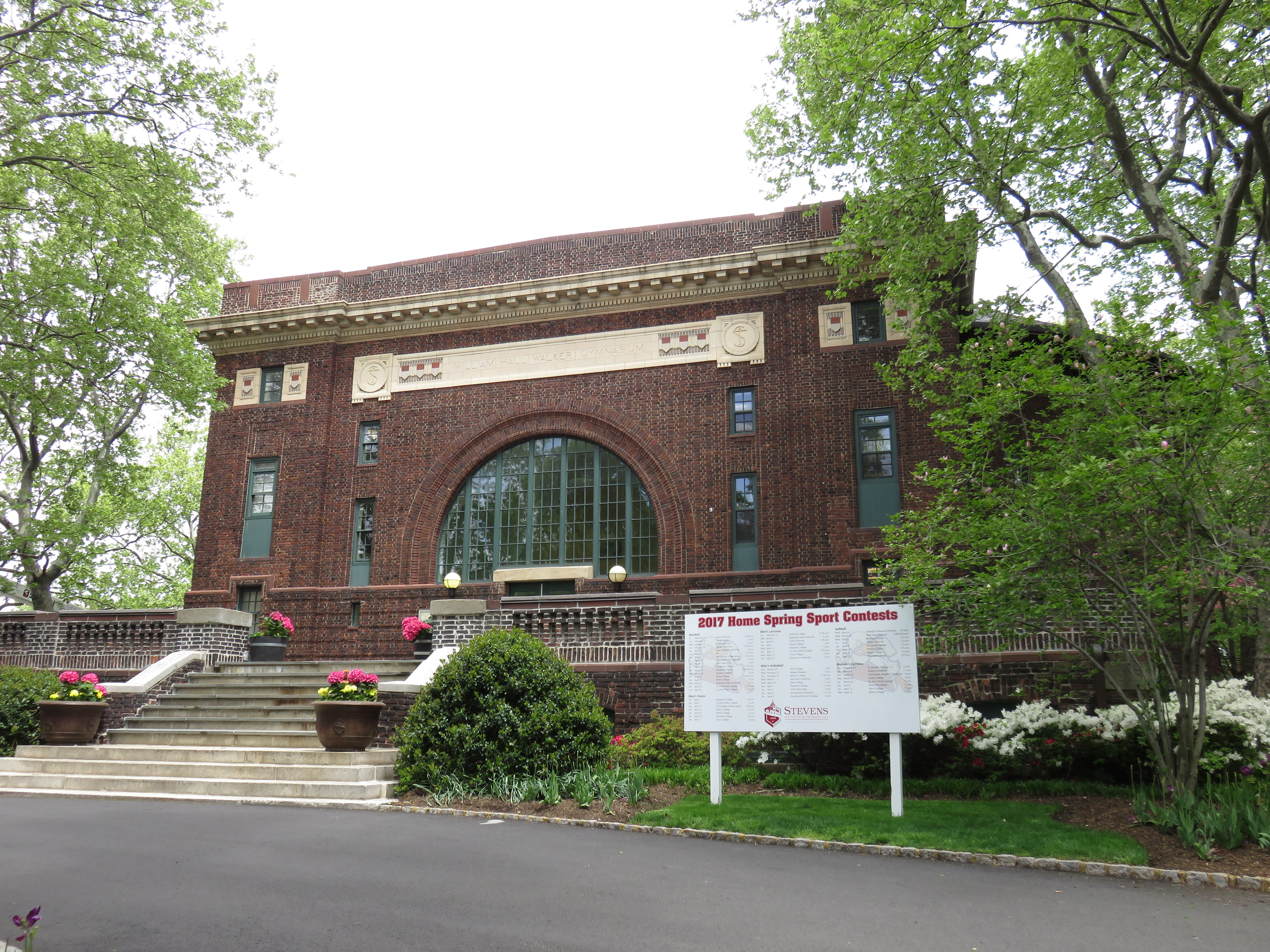

- Location within Hudson County, New Jersey Location within New Jersey Location within the United States
- Location: Sixth Street at Fieldhouse Road, Castle Point on Hudson; Hoboken, New Jersey
- Coordinates: 40°44′37″N 74°1′33″W
- Built: 1915–1916
- Architect: Ludlow and Peabody
- Architectural style: Classical Revival
- NRHP reference No.: 100003907
- NJRHP No.: 5700

Significant dates
- Added to NRHP: May 9, 2019
- Designated NJRHP: March 15, 2019

The William Hall Walker Gymnasium is an athletic facility on the campus of the Stevens Institute of Technology in the City of Hoboken in Hudson County, New Jersey. It is located near Sixth Street on Fieldhouse Road in the Castle Point section of the city. Built from 1915 to 1916, the building was added to the National Register of Historic Places on May 9, 2019, for its significance in architecture.

== See also ==
- National Register of Historic Places listings in Hudson County, New Jersey
