= Thomas Albert Howard =

American historian

Professor Thomas Albert (Tal) Howard

Thomas Albert (Tal) Howard is a Professor of History and the Humanities at Valparaiso University, Indiana. He formerly directed the Center for Faith and Inquiry and was Professor of History at Gordon College in Wenham, Massachusetts. He completed his MA (1992) and Ph.D. (1996) at the University of Virginia, concentrating in modern European intellectual and religious history. He is founding director of Gordon College's honors program, the Jerusalem and Athens Forum, a one-year, great-books course of study in the history of Christian thought and literature. He served as a principal grant writer and project director of a multimillion-dollar project funded by the Lilly Endowment, entitled "Critical Loyalty: Christian Vocation at Gordon College."

== Books ==
=== Authored ===
He is the author of Religion and the Rise of Historicism; Protestant Theology and the Making of the Modern German University; winner of the annual Lilly Fellows Program Book Award, 2007; and God and the Atlantic: America, Europe, and the Religious Divide; winner of the Christianity Today Book Awards, 2012.

=== Edited ===
He is editor of Mark Noll and James Turner, The Future of Christian Learning: An Evangelical and Catholic Dialogue, and Russell Hittinger, John Behr, and C. Ben Mitchell, Imago Dei: Human Dignity in Ecumenical Perspective.

=== Forthcoming ===
Currently, he is working on three books: The Pope and the Professor: Pius IX, Ignaz von Döllinger, and the Quandary of the Modern Age (Oxford University Press, forthcoming); Remembering the Reformation: An Inquiry into the Meanings of Protestantism (Oxford University Press, forthcoming); and, edited with Mark Noll, Protestantism after 500 Years? (Oxford University Press, forthcoming).

== Articles and essays ==
His articles, essays, and reviews have appeared in numerous journals, including the American Historical Review, Journal of the American Academy of Religion, Historically Speaking, Pro Ecclesia, Church History, Journal of the History of Ideas, History of Universities, Fides et Historia, The Christian Scholar's Review, Hedgehog Review, The National Interest, Inside Higher Ed, Journal of Church and State, The Cresset, Christian Century, Commonweal, First Things, and Books & Culture.

== Fellowships and lectures ==
In 2003-04, he was a Senior Carey Fellow in the Erasmus Institute at the University of Notre Dame. He has also spent considerable time teaching and researching outside the United States, particularly in Germany, Switzerland, and Italy. He has held fellowships from the American Academy of Religion, the Pew Charitable Trust, the Institute for Advanced Studies in Culture at the University of Virginia, the John Templeton foundation, the Lilly Fellows Program in the Humanities and the Arts at Valparaiso University, and the German Academic Exchange. He has given invited lectures at Oxford University, Cambridge University, University of Virginia, Harvard, Cornell, Dartmouth, Notre Dame, and elsewhere.
