= Stevens Tech Ducks =

- University: Stevens Institute of Technology
- NCAA: Division III
- Conference: MAC Freedom
- Basketball arena: Canavan Arena
- Baseball stadium: Dobbelaar Field
- Soccer stadium: DeBaun Athletic Complex
- Aquatics center: DeBaun Aquatic Center
- Lacrosse stadium: DeBaun Athletic Complex
- Tennis venue: Stevens Court
- Volleyball arena: Canavan Arena
- Colors: Cardinal and gray
- Website: stevensducks.com

The Stevens Ducks are the athletics teams that represent Stevens Institute of Technology in intercollegiate competition. They compete as a member of the National Collegiate Athletic Association (NCAA) Division III level.

The Ducks are members of the Middle Atlantic Conferences (MAC) and the MAC Freedom Conference for all sports except fencing. Men's fencing competes in the Mid-Atlantic Collegiate Fencing Association (MACFA) and women's fencing competes in both the Eastern Women's Fencing Conference (EWFC) and the National Intercollegiate Women's Fencing Association (NIWFA).

== Conference affiliation ==
Stevens rejoined the MAC in July 2019 after an absence of over 40 years, having most recently been in the Empire 8 conference. The Ducks spent 12 seasons as full members of the Empire 8 after a tenure in the Skyline Conference. Stevens competed as an associate member of the Empire 8 in field hockey during the 2006 season. The Ducks won a total of 62 team championships and 367 individual championships (429 total) during their time in the Empire 8.

The move to the MAC and the MAC Freedom brought 23 of the department's 25 teams under a single conference umbrella; wrestling had been competing in the Centennial Conference since 2004 and men's volleyball was a founding member of the United Volleyball Conference. Stevens has found success in the MAC, winning 23 team and 105 individual conference championships (128 total) through the Spring 2021 semester.

With an athletics lineage that dates back to 1872, Stevens was one of five schools (along with Rutgers, Princeton, Columbia and Yale) invited to establish the original set of collegiate football rules in 1873. Stevens dropped football after the 1924 season.

== Varsity sports ==
Men's sports	Women's sports
Baseball	Basketball
Basketball	Cross country
Cross country	Fencing
Fencing	Field hockey
Golf	Lacrosse
Lacrosse	Soccer
Soccer	Softball
Swimming	Swimming
Tennis	Tennis
Track and field	Track and field
Volleyball	Volleyball
Wrestling	

=== Baseball and softball ===
Baseball at Stevens dates back to 1873, although the first recognized season was in 1906. Stevens has had two players drafted in Major League Baseball's First Year Player Draft. David Garcia was selected by the Minnesota Twins in 1973 and Charlie Ruegger was selected by the New York Yankees in 2018.

Softball is Stevens' newest varsity sport. The team was established during the 2009–10 academic year. Stevens qualified for the NCAA Division III softball championship in both 2021 and 2022 by winning the MAC Freedom conference tournaments.

=== Basketball ===
Stevens men's basketball has won two NCAA Division III statistical championships, leading the country in field-goal percentage defense during the 2007–2008 season. Spencer Cook led the country in three-point field goal percentage in 2020.

=== Cross-country and track & field ===
Doctoral student Gina Dello Russo won the NCAA Division III title in the 400-meter dash at the 2021 Outdoor Track & Field National Championships in Greensboro, N.C. Dello Russo, a 2020 NCAA Woman of the Year Top 30 selection, was the first Stevens track & field champion since Amy Regan in 2017. Between cross country and indoor and outdoor track & field, Regan won six national championships for Stevens. She was the first cross-country runner in any NCAA division from New Jersey to win a national championship and later participated in the 2020 U.S. Olympic marathon team trials. Regan was also an NCAA Today Top 10 Award recipient.

Alina Duran competed at the 2021 U.S. Olympic Trials in the hammer throw, reaching the final and finishing 12th in the country.

Stevens has also won national championships in the high jump, with Gladys Njoku securing consecutive titles in 2015 and 2016.

=== Fencing ===
Women's fencing was the first female varsity sport at Stevens, and its coach, Linda Vollkommer-Lynch, was the first tenured female faculty member and first female coach at the university. In 2018, Stevens' women's fencing team did not lose to a Division III opponent all season and finished with a 32–3 overall record. That year, they established a new school record for winning percentage at .914, the first team to achieve a percentage over .900.

In 2009–10, the men's fencing team was led by head coach Stephen Kovacs who, after being accused of two sexual assaults, died in prison in 2022. The team is currently led by former Olympian Jim Carpenter.

=== Lacrosse ===
Stevens holds the distinction of having the oldest, continuously running lacrosse program in the United States. The program won a recognized national championship four times: 1892 and 1894 in the Intercollegiate Lacrosse Association, and in 1917 and 1918 in the United States Inter-Collegiate Lacrosse League. It has also won championships in the Skyline Conference, Empire 8 and MAC Freedom.

Players to come through the program have achieved All-America and Academic All-American Conference awards and North-South All-Star Game Invitations. Some of them include:

- Brian Lalli: All-America and Academic All-America midfielder (2004)
- Mark Beilicky: 3× All-American Midfielder (2005, 2006, 2007), 2007 pre-season midfielder of the year
- JR (Oreskovich) Maehler: 3× All-America attackman (2006, 2007, 2009), 2009 pre-season attackman of the year
- Shawn Coulter: USILA Short-Stick Defensive Midfielder of the Year, the first national individual award in program history.

Stevens hosted the 2006 NCAA Division III women's lacrosse national championship game.

=== Soccer ===
The 2008 men's soccer team reached the Division III NCAA championship game, losing to Messiah College (now University) on penalty kicks. They were the first Stevens team to compete in an NCAA national championship contest.

Soccer goalkeeper Zach Carr received All-American and Academic All-American honors in 2010. Carr led the nation in 2010 with a .927 save percentage and maintained a 3.92 grade-point average. One of the best goalkeepers in NCAA history, he set the Division III record and tied for the most shutouts in NCAA history (55), played the third-most minutes in Division III history and posted the sixth-lowest goals-against average. Carr was also a recipient of an NCAA Top VIII Award.

The women's team hosts an annual Engineering Cup and has one of the longest active consecutive postseason appearance streaks in Division III. The program was also the first in department history to receive an at-large bid to the NCAA Tournament and post an NCAA victory with a 1–0 win over Johns Hopkins on November 13, 2002.

=== Swimming ===
In 2011, Laura Barito, a two-time All-American in swimming and track and a two-time, two-sport NCAA national champion (in 50-yard freestyle swimming and the 400-meter hurdles), was awarded the NCAA Woman of the Year. Barito, who was also named by CoSIDA/Capital One to the Academic All-America First Team, was only the second Division III athlete to win the NCAA Woman of the Year Award in its 21-year history.

In 2012, Stevens swimmer Brittany Geyer won the national women's 200-yard breaststroke title. Geyer came back in 2015 to win the national 100 breaststroke and 200 breaststroke titles, making her a three-time NCAA champion.

Stevens men's swimming has won 10 straight conference championships. Simas Jarasunas won the 100-yard Breaststroke in 2013 for the first national championship in program history.

=== Tennis ===
Starting with the 2010 Empire 8 tournament title, the men's tennis team has won 15 straight conference championships. Their best result in the NCAA Division III tournament was qualifying for the round of 16 in 2013, where they lost to Amherst 1-5 .

=== Volleyball ===
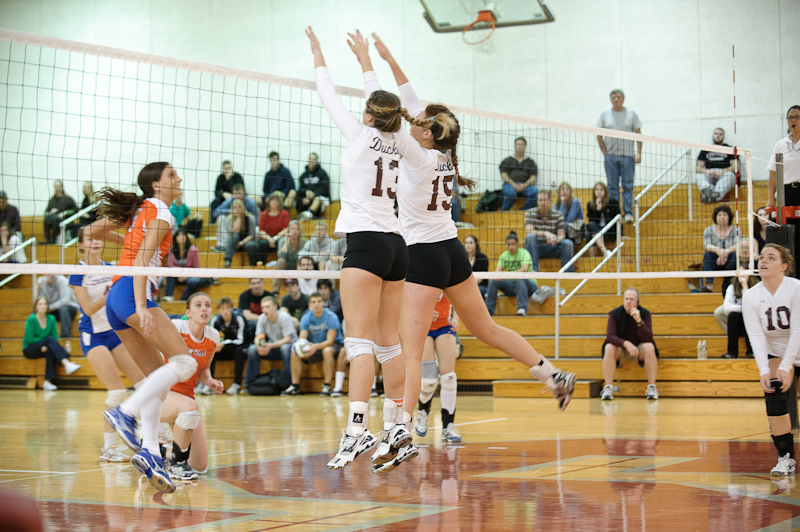
Stevens women's volleyball team in action during the fall 2011 season

Both the varsity men's and women's volleyball programs were started by legendary head coach Patrick Dorywalski. Dorywalski coached 37 years at Stevens, including 31 with the men's volleyball program. His 635 victories are the most by any varsity coach at Stevens and were the fourth-most by any men's volleyball coach in NCAA at the time of his retirement in 2020.

On April 26, 2015, Stevens won the NCAA Division III men's championship on its home court of Canavan Arena, the first NCAA team championship in Stevens' history.

Women's team alumna Eva Kwan is tied for the most digs (62) in any single match in Division III history and the second-most in NCAA history.

=== Wrestling ===
Brett Kaliner posted a 29–0 season and became the first national champion in program history in 2022, winning the title at 149 pounds.

== Former varsity sports ==
=== Football ===
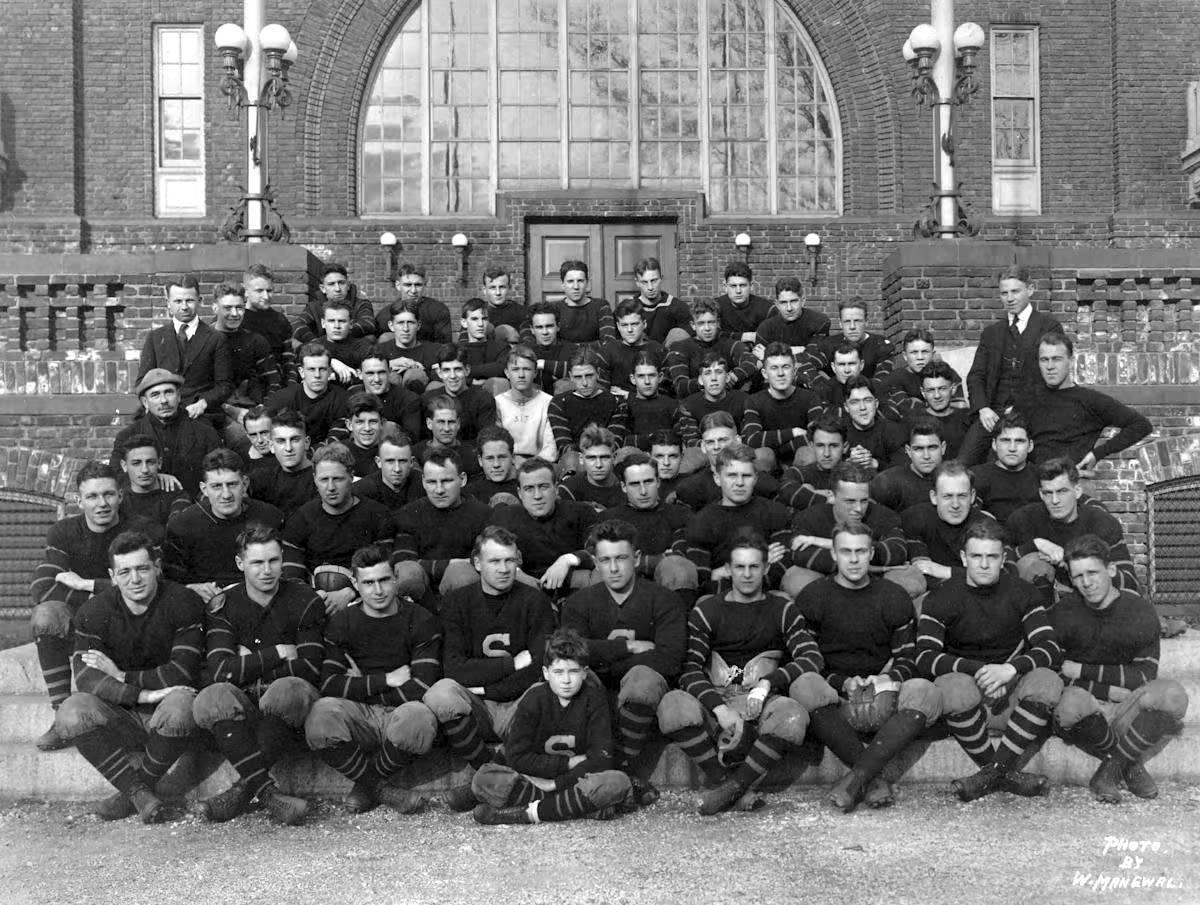
Stevens football team of 1919

Stevens was one of the first five college football teams. In 1873, representatives of Princeton, Yale, Columbia, and Rutgers met in New York City to establish the first American intercollegiate rules for football on the model of the London Football Association.

As the game developed in the United States, it became progressively more violent. The alumni magazine commented that the style of the game became too difficult and required an enormous amount of time and training, which could be afforded by larger colleges but would add too much work to the already difficult academic coursework at Stevens. Stevens holds a disputed victory over the University of Michigan.

=== Equestrian ===
Kerri Rettig won an IHSA National Championship in Intermediate Flat in 2005. Stevens ceased fielding an equestrian team as of July 1, 2019.

== Club sports ==
Stevens has 13 club sports teams. Baseball, Bowling, Climbing, Crew, Ice Hockey, Lifting, Sailing, Ski and Snowboard, Men's Soccer, Women's Soccer, Ultimate Frisbee, Men's Volleyball, and Women's Volleyball.

The Bowling team practices in their own 6 lane bowling alley on campus in Howe Center.

The Stevens Ice Hockey team plays at the Barnabus Health Hockey House in Newark, New Jersey —the practice facility of the New Jersey Devils. They play in the American Collegiate Hockey Associate Division 3.

The Stevens Sailing Team competes in the Middle Atlantic Intercollegiate Sailing Association, a member of the Inter-Collegiate Sailing Association. Founded in 1884 as the Stevens Yacht Club, they are the third oldest collegiate sailing program in the world. Currently they are a Tier-2 regional team, competing in 420's and Flying Juniors. In addition to a regatta team the student run program also hosts a development team for sailors new to dinghy racing.

== Awards and recognition ==
Stevens was named ECAC Institution of the Year in 2008 and again in 2013, an honor that measures a combination of athletics success and classroom academic performance at more than 300 Division I, II and III colleges and universities. Stevens is one of only three institutions to win the award multiple times.

The athletic department's highest finish in the annual Division III Director's Cup is 13th, recorded in 2011 and 2016. The department has received an NADIIIAA Community Service Award eight times, most recently in 2022. Stevens has also won seven College Athletic Administrators of New Jersey (CAANJ) Cups as the Top Division III institution in New Jersey.

== Facilities ==
Varsity teams compete in one of three facilities, two of which are on campus. The Schaefer Athletics and Recreation Center houses Canavan Arena, Walker Gymnasium, the DeBaun Aquatic Center, the Athletic Training Center, and the Wrestling Complex. The Schaefer Center construction was part of a $23 million investment in new facilities that also included renovations to Walker Gym and installation of a new turf field.

The softball team competes at Waterfront Park and Recreation Center, a public park in Weehawken, N.J.

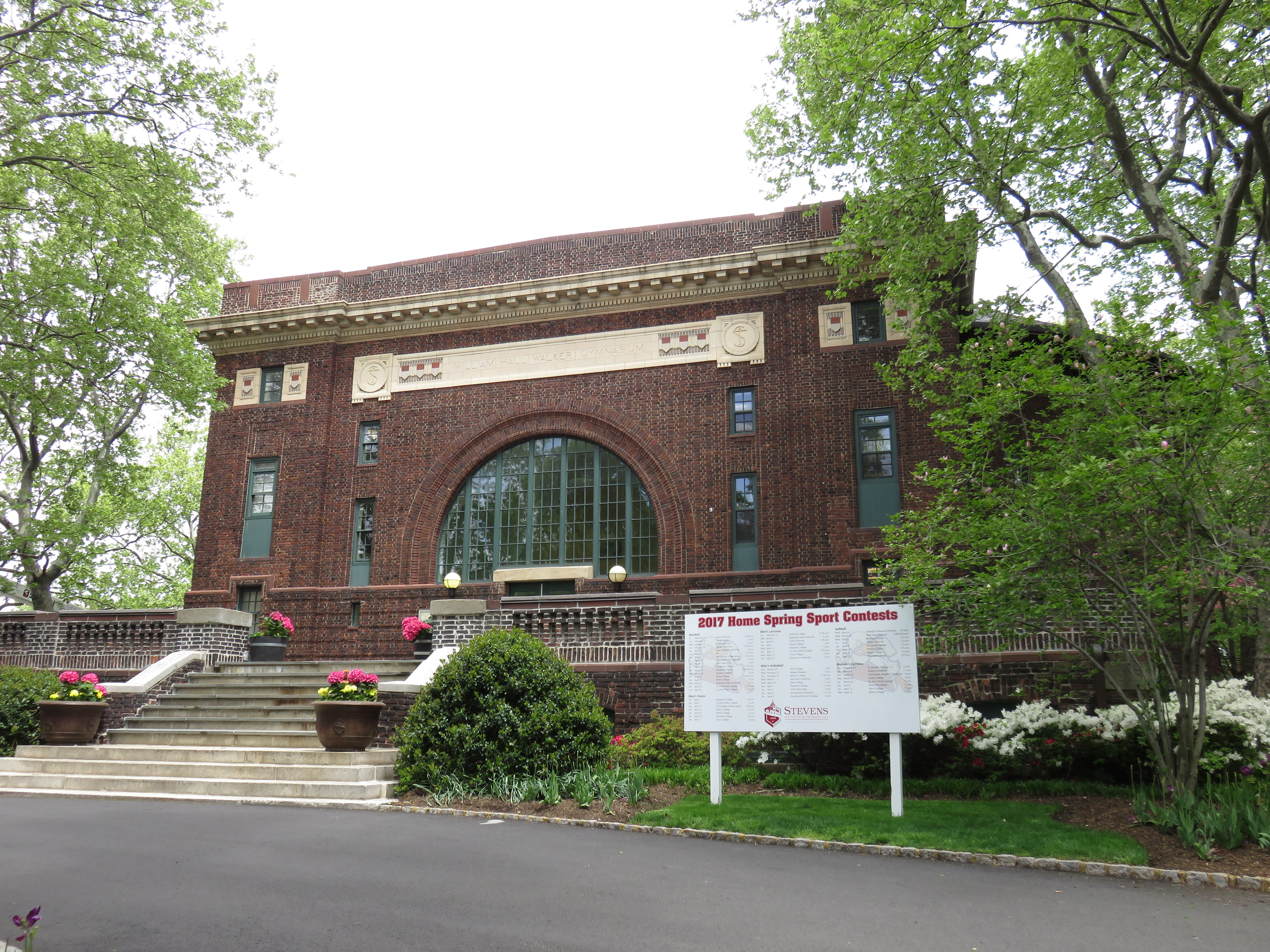
Walker Gymnasiaum

Venue	Sport	Ref.
Dobbelaar Field (Note: Part of the DeBaun Athletic Complex.)	Baseball	
Canavan Arena	Basketball; Volleyball	
DeBaun Athletic Complex	Soccer; Lacrosse; Field hockey	
DeBaun Aquatic Center	Swimming	
Tennis Court	Tennis	
William Hall Walker Gymnasium (Note: The facility has basketball and volleyball courts but the Stevens Tech teams do not play their official games there.)	Basketball; Volleyball; Athletics	

== See also ==
- List of college athletic programs in New Jersey, USA#Division III
