= Memorial Gymnasium (Virginia) =

Gym facility the University of Virginia, Virginia

- Mem Gym
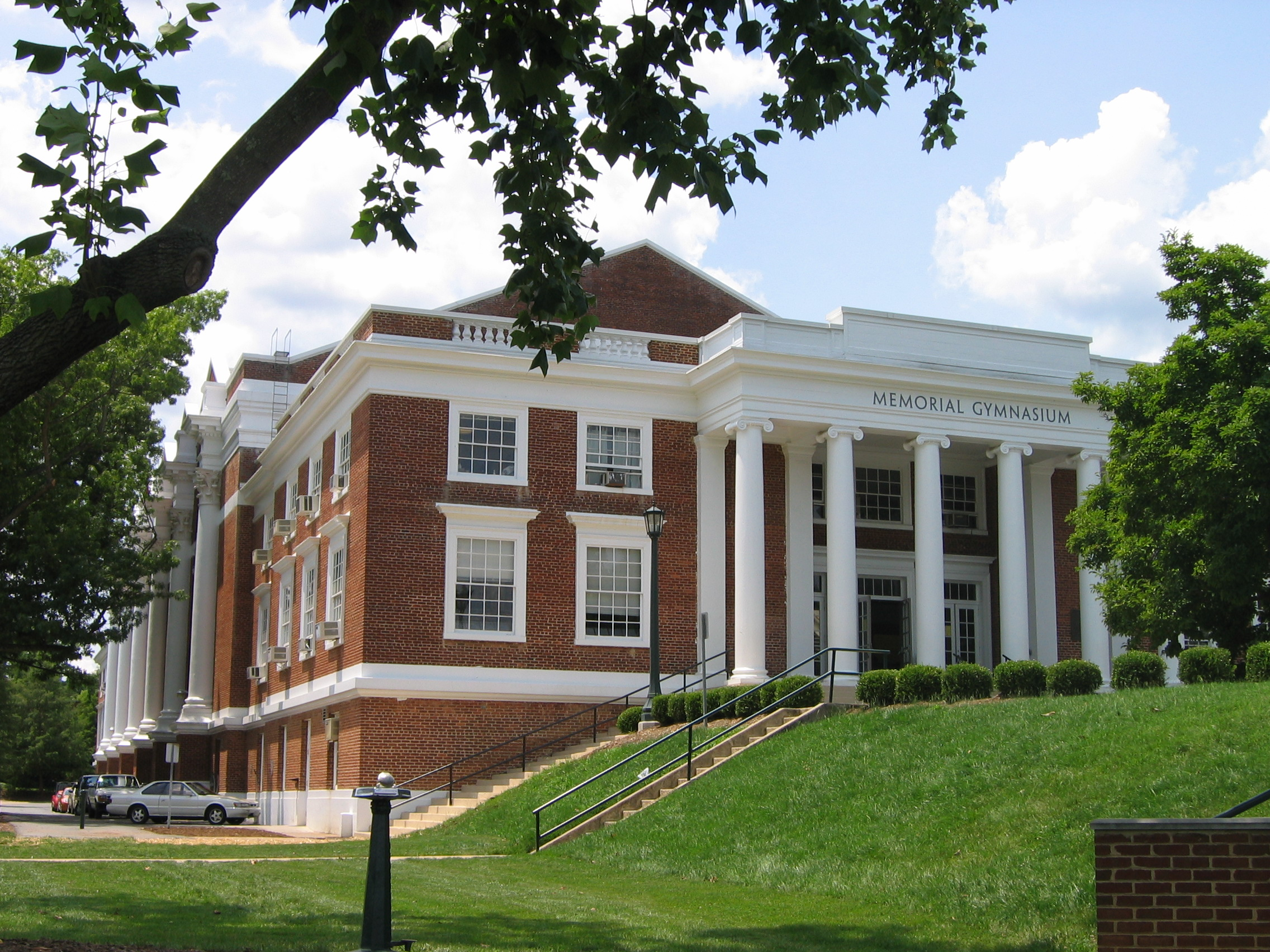
- Interactive map of Memorial Gymnasium
- Location: 210 Emmet Street South
- Owner: University of Virginia
- Operator: University of Virginia
- Capacity: 2,500
- Surface: wood court

Construction
- Opened: 1924
- Renovated: 2005
- Architect: Fiske Kimball

Tenants
- Virginia Cavaliers (Volleyball and Wrestling) (Formerly Swimming and Basketball)
- Memorial Gymnasium
- U.S. National Register of Historic Places
- Virginia Landmarks Register
- Location within Virginia Location within the United States
- Location: 210 S. Emmett St., Charlottesville, Virginia
- Coordinates: 38°2′14″N 78°30′27″W
- Area: 5.1 acres (2.1 ha)
- Built: 1924
- Architect: Fiske, Kimble, et al.
- Architectural style: Beaux Arts
- NRHP reference No.: 04001291
- VLR No.: 104-0095

Significant dates
- Added to NRHP: December 4, 2004
- Designated VLR: March 17, 2004

Memorial Gymnasium is a 2,500-seat multi-purpose arena in Charlottesville, Virginia, United States. It opened in 1924. It replaced Fayerweather Gymnasium as home to the University of Virginia Cavaliers basketball team until University Hall opened in 1965.

== History ==
Established originally as a memorial to the University's World War I casualties, the facility continues to play a role in the athletic, recreational and physical education-kinesiology programs at the school. The classes of 1920 and 1921 pledged a collected total of $142,000 in support of the gymnasium as a memorial and construction was completed in 1924. From its completion, the gymnasium housed a variety of sporting and social activities, including basketball, boxing and dances. The basketball program was housed in the building for 42 seasons before University Hall opened in 1965. It was also the past home of the swimming and dive teams and indoor track teams. After renovations, the building - now used extensively by the University's intramural programs - also serves as the home arena for the Cavaliers' wrestling and women's volleyball teams.

Memorial Gym was the site of President Franklin D. Roosevelt's "Stab in the Back" speech on June 10, 1940, when, in the middle of giving his commencement address to the graduating class, he was informed of the alliance between Italy and Nazi Germany.

While making a commencement speech at the Memorial Gymnasium of the University of Virginia, President Roosevelt denounced Mussolini: "On this tenth day of June, 1940, the hand that held the dagger has plunged it into the back of its neighbor." The president also said that military victories for the "gods of force and hate" were a threat to all democracies in the western world and that America could no longer pretend to be a "lone island in a world of force."

== Current usage ==
Memorial Gymnasium hosts the school wrestling and volleyball teams, and is also used by the school as an intramural sports venue. The building includes a small weight room, including cardiovascular machines, and boxing practice facilities, as well as an indoor wooden jogging track on the second floor that rings around and overlooks the basketball courts on the first floor. The swimming pool was also primarily used prior to the construction of the Aquatic and Fitness Center. The swimming pool was finally closed in 2007 and converted into an indoor soccer ground.

== See also ==
- Virginia Cavaliers
