= Virginia Conference =

Intercollegiate athletic conference (1922–1936)

- Founded: 1922
- Folded: 1936
- No. of teams: 11 (total)
- Region: Virginia, North Carolina, Washington, D.C.

The Virginia Intercollegiate Athletic Conference (often shortened to just the Virginia Conference) was an intercollegiate athletic conference primarily composed of member schools located in the state of Virginia, though the conference did briefly include schools from both North Carolina and Washington, D.C. in its membership at various points in time. The league existed from January 1922 to December 1936, though it did not start organizing athletic competitions and enforcing eligibility requirements until the beginning of the 1923 football season. Before the withdrawal of the North Carolina colleges in 1927, the conference was officially known as the Virginia–North Carolina Intercollegiate Athletic Conference.

== The Virginia–North Carolina Intercollegiate Athletic Conference (1922–1927) ==
With intercollegiate athletics growing increasingly disparate in competitive level in the early 1920s (and several of the prominent colleges from the region having formed the Southern Conference in February 1921), a number of the smaller colleges from North Carolina and Virginia set out to create their own intercollegiate conference. Led by a number of the core members of the Eastern Virginia Intercollegiate Athletic Association (which dissolved in October 1921), conversations began first in January 1922 among twelve colleges from the two states, with Hampden–Sydney College, Lynchburg College, Randolph–Macon College, University of Richmond, and College of William & Mary from Virginia, and Davidson College, Elon College, Guilford College, and Wake Forest College from North Carolina. Trinity College (now known as Duke University) and Emory and Henry College were absent from the meeting, though both schools had been invited. In the meeting, the schools resolved to organize a conference by June 1, 1922 which followed "Harvard" eligibility rules, barred so-called "tramp" athletes (who moved on a transitory basis from one school to another based on the whims of the athletic prospects), and professionalism issues.

For reasons that remain unclear, the conference delayed its official organization until January 1, 1923, at which time it planned to begin intercollegiate play. The conference initially organized in December 1922 with just eight members, including Elon, Hampden–Sydney, Lynchburg, Randolph–Macon, and Richmond from the original meeting, as well as Bridgewater College, Roanoke College, and Lenoir–Rhyne College; William & Mary joined the following January. After the first meeting, Frederic W. Boatwright was elected president of the association. Invitations were also extended to Emory & Henry, Davidson, Wake Forest, Trinity, and Guilford; all but Emory & Henry declined to join. By April 1923, it was reported that the remaining North Carolina colleges were unlikely to join, as there was a separate movement of their own to organize; Such an effort was spearheaded by Robert Lee Flowers of Trinity, but appears to have not come to fruition. Emory & Henry was also participating in meetings and joined prior to the start of any regular athletic activity, though no formal announcement of their decision to join has been found.

Like many of the smaller athletic associations, the V-NCIAC was quickly embroiled in controversy. Following the 1923 football season, Lynchburg left the conference over an eligibility dispute, but was reinstated less than a week later after the situation was explained and remediation offered. The following year, both William & Mary and Richmond began posturing for a future move to the Southern Intercollegiate Athletic Association (SIAA), primarily citing dissatisfaction with their own league's continued reluctance to implement a one-year rule and prohibit the playing of freshmen in varsity athletics.

By 1927, the failure to create a one-year rule had still not been resolved; William & Mary took up the cause, threatening to leave and join a conference "of consequence". Finally, the conference bowed to the desires of the larger schools, banning freshmen from intercollegiate athletics by the start of the 1928 football season. The decision prompted Elon and Lenoir to leave the conference following the 1927 football season, with Lenoir leaving immediately and Elon waiting to depart until the close of the 1927–28 basketball season. With the only two North Carolina members having departed, the conference began to be known as the Virginia Conference, though the dual-state name remained in use informally into 1928.

== The Virginia Conference (1927–1936) ==
Though there were discussions in 1927 for member institutions to leave the conference for either the SIAA or a new organization after meetings in Charlotte involving several schools from South Carolina, North Carolina, and Virginia, the conference remained intact aside from the departure of the North Carolina schools; in fact, the Virginia Conference even made a push for the interested parties to join their own conference in a bid for expansion. Aside from Lynchburg College electing to drop intercollegiate football in the summer of 1932, the Virginia Conference went through a period of relative stability following the departure of the Carolina schools.

Following the 1932 football season, the teams held their annual conference in late November, and voted in several changes. First, the conference voted to re-allow the invitation of members outside of Virginia, namely St. John's (MD) and American University, both from the neighboring Baltimore area. While American accepted the invitation and played sports in the Virginia Conference for the winter of 1932 and early spring of 1933, St. John's did not accept the invitation. The reason for their indecision was because of a second major change which transpired during the annual conference: the re-implementation of the controversial freshman rule, which had been suspended in the interim. This was especially problematic considering the fact that both St. John's and American played freshmen on their athletic teams at the time of their acceptance to the conference. Sports pundits widely decried the move as the conference sounding its own death knell.

Adding to the instability, a disagreement between The College of William & Mary and Emory and Henry College over football player eligibility prompted the two to cut relations in the sport and exacerbated what conference officials deemed a "rather serious" situation. At the same time, both William & Mary and the University of Richmond were pursuing membership in the Southern Conference.

As predicted, several of the smaller schools left the Virginia Conference to form the Chesapeake Conference following the 1932-33 basketball season, leaving just four members remaining: Emory & Henry, William & Mary, Roanoke, and Richmond. While Richmond and William & Mary had hopes of joining the Southern Conference, they did not join until before the 1936 football season because of the SIAA's decision to temporarily hold off on expansion. Both William & Mary and Richmond played as dual members of the Southern and Virginia Conferences for the 1936 season, but the conference was dissolved the following December after Emory & Henry announced their intentions to withdraw, with aspirations of joining the SIAA, the previous June.

== Member schools ==
The following colleges held membership in the Virginia Conference:

Institution	Location	Founded	Nickname	Joined	Left	Current conference
American University	Washington, D.C.	1893	Eagles	1932 (Note: participated in basketball season only before departing for Chesapeake Conference)	1933	Patriot
Bridgewater College	Bridgewater, Virginia	1880	Eagles	1923	1933	ODAC
Elon College	Elon, North Carolina	1889	Phoenix	1923	1928	CAA
Emory and Henry College	Emory, Virginia	1836	Wasps	1923	1936	ODAC
Hampden–Sydney College	Hampden Sydney, Virginia	1775	Tigers	1923	1933	ODAC
Lenoir–Rhyne College	Hickory, North Carolina	1891	Bears	1923	1927	SAC
Lynchburg College	Lynchburg, Virginia	1903	Fighting Hornets	1923 (Note: except for a brief departure in December 1923)	1933	ODAC
Randolph–Macon College	Ashland, Virginia	1830	Yellow Jackets	1923	1933	ODAC
University of Richmond	Richmond, Virginia	1830	Spiders	1923	1936	A–10 (all sports); CAA (football)
Roanoke College	Salem, Virginia	1842	Maroons	1923	1936	ODAC
College of William & Mary	Williamsburg, Virginia	1693	Indians	1923	1936	CAA

== Champions ==
=== Football ===
- 1927 – William & Mary
- 1928 – Emory and Henry
- 1929 – William & Mary
- 1930 – William & Mary
- 1931 – Randolph–Macon
- 1932 – Richmond
- 1933 – Emory and Henry, Richmond, and William & Mary
- 1934 – Richmond and William & Mary
- 1935 – William & Mary

=== Basketball ===
- 1928 – William & Mary
- 1929 – Richmond
- 1930 – William & Mary
- 1931 – William & Mary
- 1932 – William & Mary
- 1933 – William & Mary
- 1934 – Emory & Henry
