= University of Lynchburg =

Christian university in Lynchburg, Virginia, US

Coordinates: 37.398468°N 79.18101°W

- Former names: Virginia Christian College (1903–1919); Lynchburg College (1919–2018)
- Type: Private university
- Established: 1903; 123 years ago
- Religious affiliation: Christian Church (Disciples of Christ)
- Endowment: $140.75 million (2025)
- President: Sally Coleman Selden
- Faculty: 159 full time
- Students: 2,592
- Undergraduates: 1,792
- Postgraduates: 800
- Location: Lynchburg, Virginia, United States
- Colors: Crimson and Silver
- Nickname: Hornets
- Sporting affiliations: NCAA Division III – ODAC
- Mascot: Dell the Hornet
- Website: lynchburg.edu
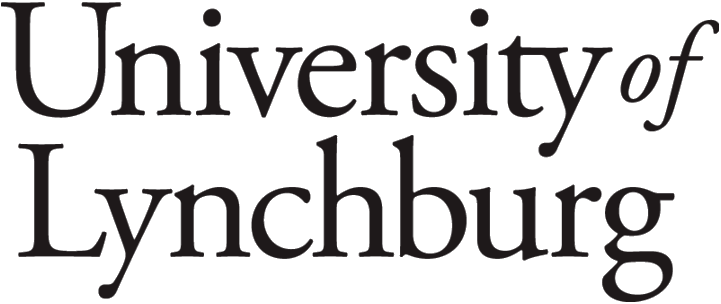

The University of Lynchburg, formerly Lynchburg College, is a private university associated with the Christian Church (Disciples of Christ) and located in Lynchburg, Virginia, United States. It has approximately 2,800 undergraduate and graduate students. The university's campus spans 264 acres. Although the university is accredited by the Southern Association of Colleges and Schools, it has been on "warning" since 2024.

== History ==
The University of Lynchburg was founded in 1903 by Josephus Hopwood as "Virginia Christian College". Hopwood was president of Milligan College in Tennessee when a group of ministers and businessmen approached him about establishing a college in Lynchburg. He agreed to serve as president, after which the group purchased the failed Westover Hotel resort for $13,500, securing Lynchburg's current campus. Hopwood worked with his wife Sarah Eleanor LaRue Hopwood to establish the college based on their shared vision.

The University of Lynchburg was the first institution in the United States to train nuclear physicists and engineers for the NS Savannah project under the order of President Eisenhower, to aid in the development and operation of the world's first nuclear-powered ship.

The institution officially changed its name to Lynchburg College in 1919, citing a constituency that had expanded beyond Virginia.

Beginning with 11 faculty and 55 students, the institution has grown to 159 full-time faculty and 2,800 undergraduate and graduate students. For undergraduate students, the university offers 39 majors, 49 minors, two dual-degree programs, and the Westover Honors Program. It also confers the Master of Arts, Master of Business Administration, Master of Education, and Master of Science in Nursing as well as doctoral degrees in physical therapy, physician assistants, and educational leadership.

The University of Lynchburg hymn was written by alumnus Paul E. Waters. Its melody is derived from J. S. Bach's "O Haupt voll Blut und Wunden".

A notable longtime faculty member was Sheldon Vanauken who taught English and history from the 1940s until the 1980s and won the National Book Award for A Severe Mercy about his friendship with C. S. Lewis.

In fall 1994, a few months after Intel introduced its Pentium microprocessor, Thomas R. Nicely, from the University of Lynchburg, was performing computations related to the distribution of prime numbers and discovered the Pentium FDIV bug. Nicely left Lynchburg College in 2000.

In July 2018, the university changed its name from Lynchburg College to the University of Lynchburg. In May 2024, university administrators announced significant cuts to the university's academic programs, staff, and faculty. They planned to close 12 undergraduate majors, 25 undergraduate minors, and five graduate programs. They also planned to eliminate 40 staff and 40 faculty positions. University leaders described this as a "strategic transformation" that was necessary in light of declining enrollments and growing debt. From 2017 to 2022, enrollment decreased by nearly 15% to about 2,400 students. In 2023, the university experienced a deficit of $8.6 million.

In December 2024, the university was placed on "warning" status and had its reaffirmation of accreditation denied by its accreditor, the Southern Association of Colleges and Schools, after the accreditor's board found significant non-compliance with its standards for financial responsibility and student outcomes. In December 2025 the university was kept on Warning status for a second and final year.

=== Presidents ===
President	Term
Josephus Hopwood	1903–1911
S.T. Willis	1911–1912
G.O. Davis	1912–1914
Matthew Clark (acting)	1914–1915
John T. Hundley	1915–1936
Riley B. Montgomery	1936–1949
Orville W. Wake '32	1949–1964
M. Carey Brewer '49	1964–1983
George N. Rainsford	1983–1993
Charles O. Warren	1993–2001
Kenneth R. Garren	2001–2020
Alison Morrison-Shetlar	2020–2026
Sally Coleman Selden	2026–present

== Campus ==
The University of Lynchburg is located in Lynchburg, Virginia, about 180 miles southwest of Washington D.C., in the Central Virginia foothills of the Blue Ridge Mountains. It occupies 250 acres (1.0 km^{2}) in Lynchburg and has a separate environmental research center on 470 acres (1.9 km^{2}), the Claytor Nature Study Center, located about 40 minutes from campus. Most students live on campus and in nearby university-owned houses.

== Student life ==
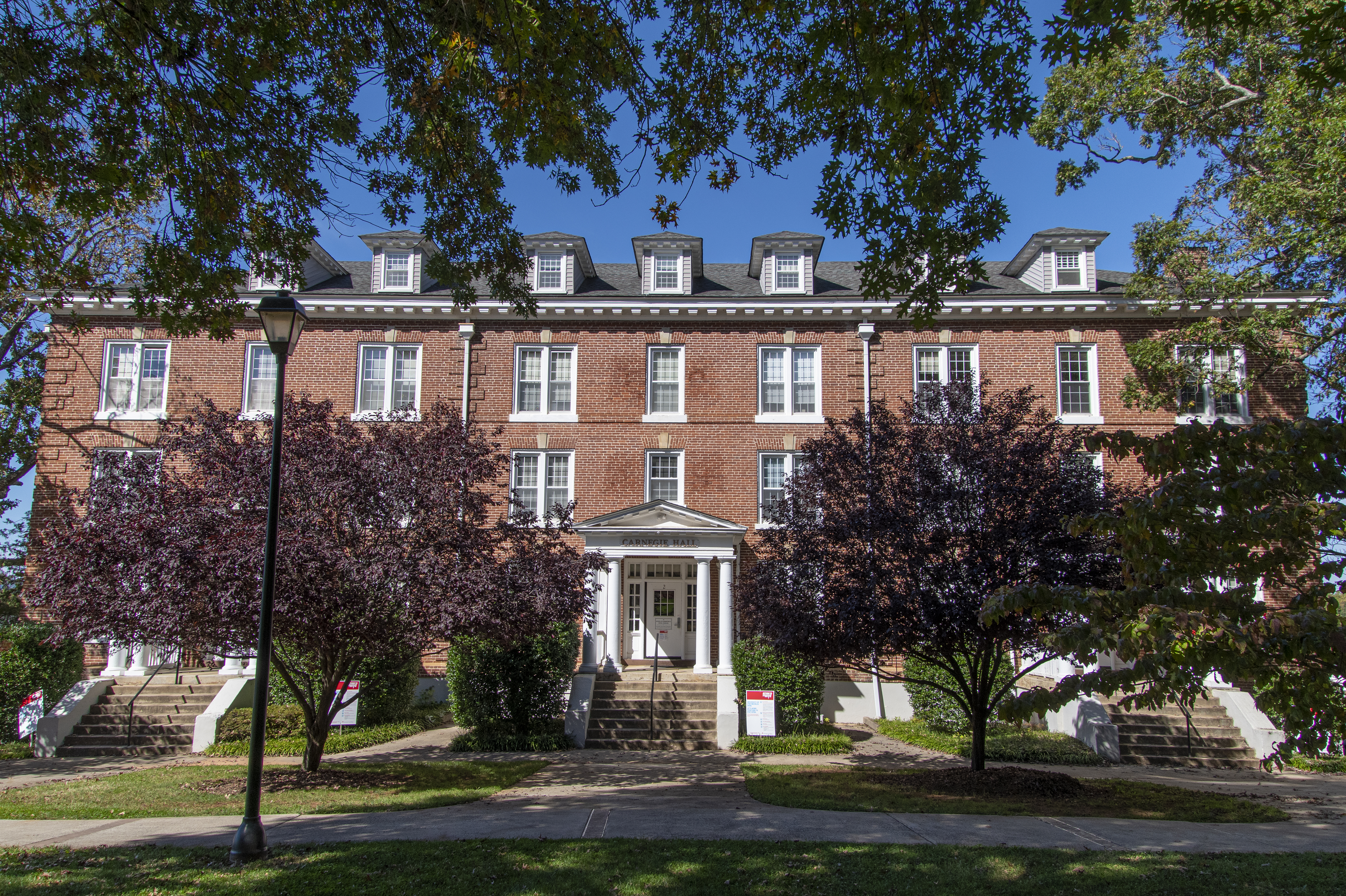
Carnegie Hall

The University of Lynchburg has over 40 clubs and organizations for students to participate in. Examples of organization types are Greek life, student government, spiritual life, volunteer organizations, leadership programs, and publications.

=== Greek life ===
Fraternity life began on the University of Lynchburg campus in 1962, but disbanded in the mid-1980s. Fraternities and sororities appeared on campus again in 1992. All official Greek houses are located on Vernon Street and are currently owned by the university.

== Athletics ==
The University of Lynchburg Hornets participate in NCAA Division III and the Old Dominion Athletic Conference (ODAC). The Hornets program offers 24 intercollegiate athletics programs, 23 which compete in Division III, along with equestrian, which competes in both the Intercollegiate Horse Shows Association and National Collegiate Equestrian Association formats. Since joining the ODAC as a charter member in 1976, the Hornets have recorded 205 conference titles.

In recent years, Lynchburg athletics has competed for four team national championships. The women's soccer program won Lynchburg's first-ever team national championship in 2014, defeating Williams College in penalty kicks to take the crown. In 2010, the Hornets men's soccer program reached the Division III national championship match, where they fell in overtime to Messiah College. In 2015, the men's lacrosse team made its own run to the national title game, losing to Tufts University in the championship game, 19–11. In the 2023 NCAA DIII baseball tournament final, Lynchburg defeated Johns Hopkins in 3 games to capture its first national championship.

Multiple men's cross country, indoor, and outdoor track & field athletes have captured NCAA Division III titles over the years as well. In 2009, Ricky Flynn won the Division III men's cross country championship.

== Notable alumni ==
Name	Known for	Relationship to Lynchburg College
Brad Babcock	College baseball coach and administrator	BA, 1963
Buddy Bailey	Professional baseball manager, former major league coach	BA in Physical Education, 1979
Bob Duff	Senator - State of Connecticut	BA, 1993, Sigma Phi Epsilon
Jerry Falwell	Founder of Liberty University	Journalism student before transferring to Bible Baptist College
Ted Gulick	Episcopal bishop	Graduate
William J. Hadden	Chaplain, US Army and US Navy, and Episcopal Church	BA, 1944
Franklin P. Hall	Virginia House of Delegates	Graduate
Whit Haydn	Magician, entertainer	BA, 1972
John Hobbs	Major League Baseball player	BA, 1978,
Howard Kester	Preacher, organizer, activist and author	BA 1924
Robert A. McKee	Member, Maryland House of Delegates	B.A. in political science in 1971
Deirdre Quinn	Actress	1993 BA in Theatre
Jessamine Shumate	Artist and painter	Attended art classes during the 1940s
Kathrine Switzer	First woman to officially run the Boston Marathon	Attended for two years
Setsuko Thurlow	Anti-nuclear weapons activist who accepted 2017 Nobel Peace Prize on behalf of ICAN	B.A. in Sociology in 1955
Percy Wootton	American Medical Association president	Graduate
