= Bridgewater Eagles =

- University: Bridgewater College
- Conference: Old Dominion Athletic Conference (primary); ECAC (equestrian)
- NCAA: Division III
- Athletic director: Curt Kendall
- Location: Bridgewater, Virginia
- Varsity teams: 21
- Football stadium: Jopson Athletic Complex
- Basketball arena: Nininger Hall
- Baseball stadium: Jopson Athletic Complex
- Mascot: Ernie The Eagle
- Nickname: Eagles
- Colors: Crimson and Gold
- Website: bridgewatereagles.com
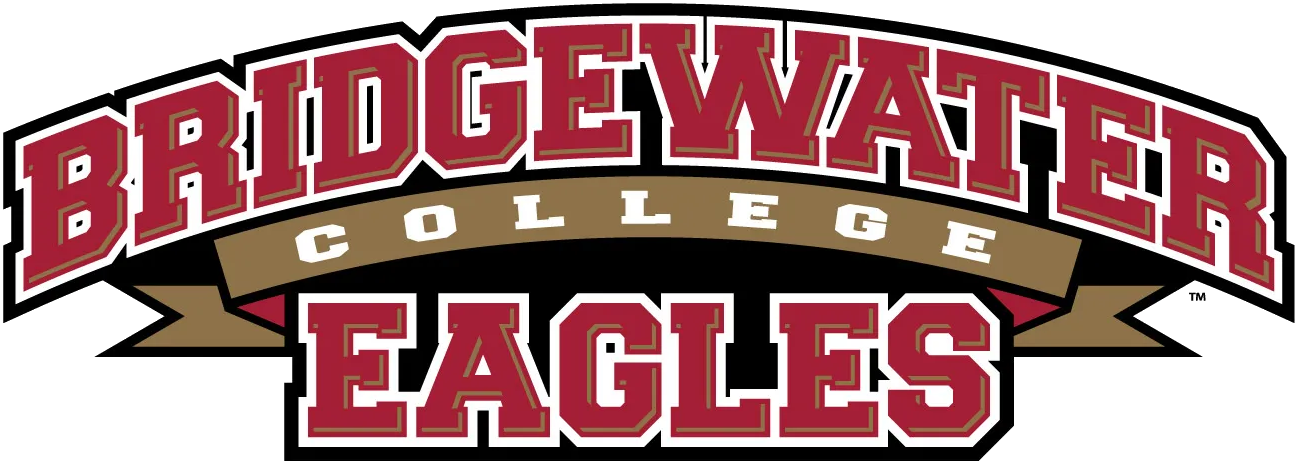

The Bridgewater Eagles are the athletic teams that represent Bridgewater College, located in Bridgewater, Virginia, in NCAA Division III intercollegiate sports. The Eagles compete as members of the Old Dominion Athletic Conference. Altogether, Bridgewater sponsors 23 sports: 11 for men and 12 for women.

== Varsity teams ==
Men's sports	Women's sports
Baseball	Basketball
Basketball	Cross country
Cross country	Equestrian
Football	Field hockey
Golf	Golf
Lacrosse	Lacrosse
Soccer	Soccer
Swimming	Softball
Tennis	Swimming
Track and field	Tennis
Volleyball	Track and field
	Volleyball

=== Baseball ===
In 2014, the Bridgewater College baseball team won the Old Dominion Athletic Conference (ODAC) tournament and finished the season in the NCAA Division III South Regional Championship. The Eagles lost to Emory University, the eventual College World Series Runner-Up. This was the first ever South Regional title appearance for the Eagles as they finished in the Sweet Sixteen and were ranked in the Top 25 in both d3baseball.com and ABCA Top 30 final polls.

=== Equestrian ===
The equestrian team has consistently been one of the top teams in the Zone 4 Region 2 of the IHSA, winning the title in 2006 and 2011, and also winning the ODAC championship in 2007 and 2009. In 2011, Bridgewater's first ever trip to the IHSA National Show resulted in a tie for fifth place in the team standings with the University of Kentucky. Bridgewater riders finished in the Top 10 in seven of the eight classes. The top six finishers in each class scored points for their team.

=== Football ===
In 2001, the Bridgewater College football team finished the season as national runner-up after a 30–27 loss to Mount Union in the Stagg Bowl NCAA Division III National Football Championship.

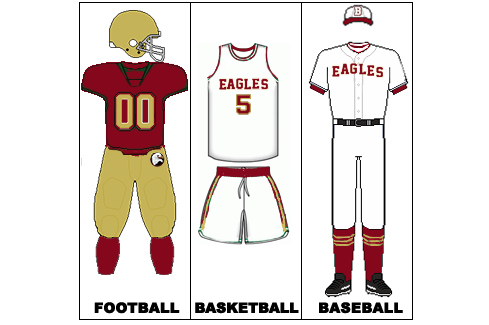
Bridgewater athletics uniforms, fltr: football, basketball, and baseball

Year	Round	Opponent	Result
2000	First Round; Second Round	Washington & Jefferson; Trinity (TX)	W, 59–42; L, 41–47 ^{OT}
2001	Second Round; Quarterfinals; Semifinals; Stagg Bowl	Trinity (TX); Widener; Rowan; Mount Union	W, 41–37; W, 57–32; W, 29–24; L, 27–30
2002	First Round; Second Round	King's (PA); Trinity (TX)	W, 19–17; L, 32–38
2003	First Round; Second Round; Quarterfinals; Semifinals	Waynesburg; Christopher Newport; Lycoming; Mount Union	W, 28–14; W, 26–3; W, 13–9; L, 0–66
2004	First Round	Washington & Jefferson	L, 48–55 ^{2OT}
2005	First Round; Second Round; Quarterfinals	Washington & Jefferson; Thiel; Wesley	W, 30–21; W, 24–13; L, 7–46
2019	First Round	Delaware Valley	L, 22–30
Playoff Record			10–7
