= Michael Maxey =

American academic administrator

Michael C. Maxey
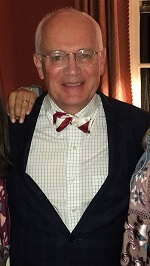

11th President of Roanoke College
- In office August 2007 – July 2022
- Preceded by: Sabine O'Hara
- Succeeded by: Frank Shushok, Jr.

Personal details
- Born: Michael Creed Maxey; December 7, 1951 (age 74) Bassett, Virginia
- Spouse: Terri Maxey
- Education: Wake Forest University (BA, MA)
- Profession: Academic administrator

Michael Creed Maxey (born c. 1951) was the 11th President of Roanoke College.

Michael C. Maxey became Roanoke's eleventh president on July 1, 2007; he was unanimously elected by the board of trustees having served as Roanoke's vice president for college relations and dean of admissions and financial aid from 1992 until his selection as president. He was inducted into Omicron Delta Kappa at Roanoke in 2004. He holds undergraduate and graduate degrees from Wake Forest University.

A campaign was launched during his tenure to raise $200 million to finance facilities, endowment, and special projects; the college had already secured $130 million before the campaign was publicly launched on April 13, 2013.

Maxey's most recent large project was the $35 million Cregger Center, opened in 2016.

== Personal life ==
Maxey is a native of Bassett, Virginia. He lives with his wife, Terri, in a residence adjacent to the Roanoke campus. The couple have grown children.

Academic offices
Preceded by Sabine U. O'Hara	President of Roanoke College; 2007–present	Succeeded by Incumbent
