= Roanoke College =

Private liberal arts college in Salem, Virginia, US

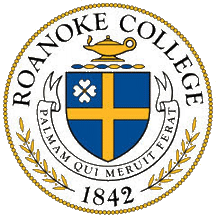
- Former names: Virginia Institute (1842–1845); Virginia Collegiate Institute (1845–1853)
- Motto: "Palmam Qui Meruit Ferat"
- Motto in English: "Let him who earned the palm bear it."
- Type: Private liberal arts college
- Established: 1842; 184 years ago
- Religious affiliation: Evangelical Lutheran Church in America
- Academic affiliations: Annapolis Group
- Endowment: $175.5 million (2024)
- President: Frank Shushok, Jr.
- Faculty: 164 (tenure-track)
- Students: 1,759
- Location: Salem, Virginia, US
- Campus: Suburban 80 acres
- Colors: Old Maroon and Gray (athletic) Blue and Yellow (academic)
- Nickname: Maroons
- Sporting affiliations: NCAA Division III – ODAC
- Mascot: Rooney (a "Maroon-tailed Hawk")
- Website: roanoke.edu
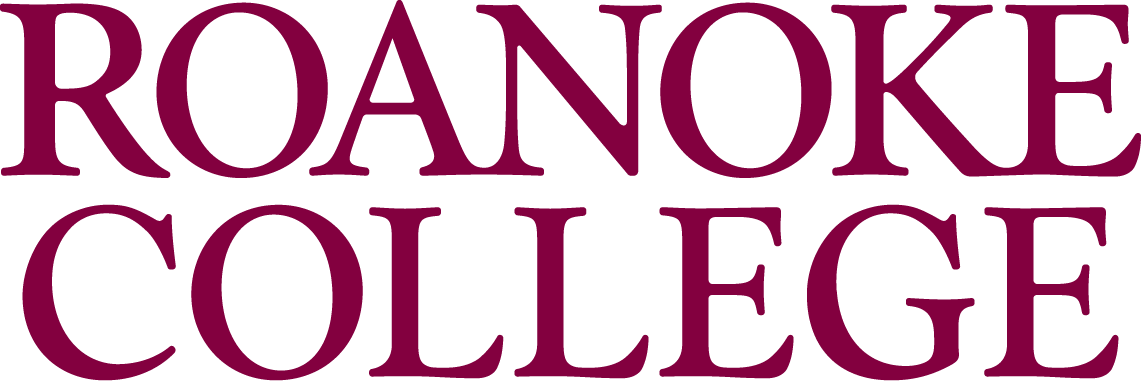

Roanoke College is a private liberal arts college in Salem, Virginia. It has approximately 2,000 students who represent approximately 40 states and 30 countries. The college offers 35 majors, 57 minors and concentrations, and pre-professional programs. Roanoke awards bachelor's degrees in arts, science, and business administration and is one of 280 colleges with a chapter of the Phi Beta Kappa honor society.

Roanoke is an NCAA Division III school competing in the Old Dominion Athletic Conference. The college has fourteen men's and fourteen women's varsity sports. Roanoke's athletic nickname is Maroons and the mascot is Rooney, a maroon-tailed hawk.

== History ==
=== Early years ===
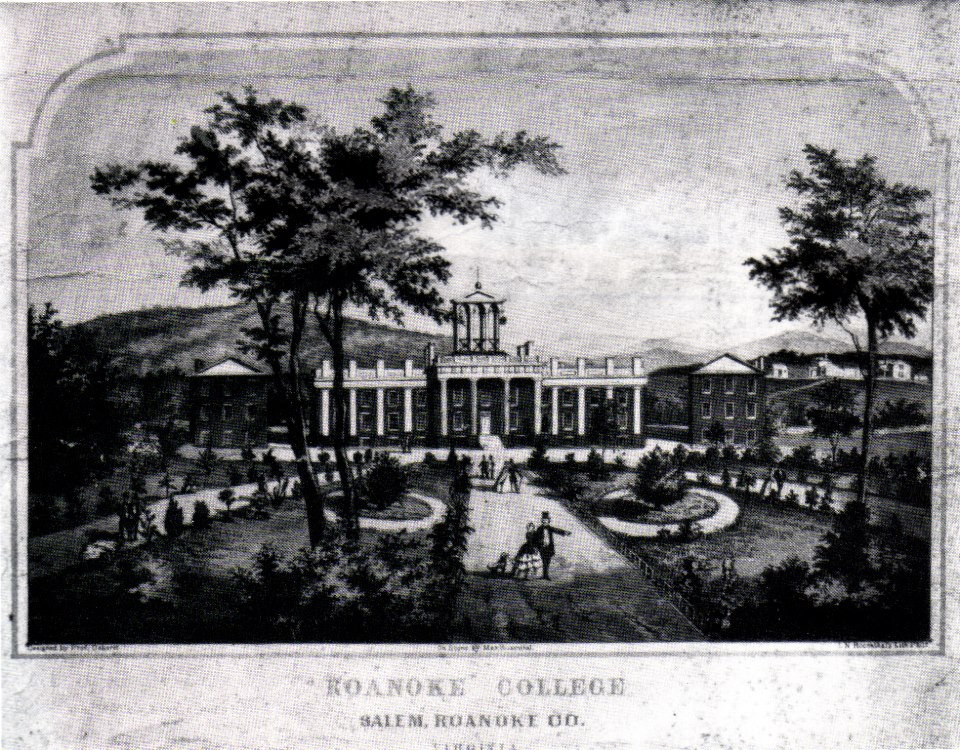
Roanoke College during the late-19th century: the John R. Turbyfill Front Quadrangle with (left to right) Miller Hall, The Administration Building, and Trout Hall, all listed on the National Register of Historic Places

A boys' preparatory school was founded by Lutheran pastors David F. Bittle and Christopher C. Baughmann. Originally located in Augusta County near Staunton, the school was named Virginia Institute until chartered on January 30, 1845, as Virginia Collegiate Institute. In 1847, the institute moved to Salem which was developing into a center of commerce and transportation in the region; the school moved all of its possessions in a single covered wagon. The Virginia General Assembly granted a college charter on March 14, 1853, and approved the name Roanoke College, chosen in honor of the Roanoke Valley. Bittle then served as the college's first president.

Roanoke was one of the few Southern colleges that remained open throughout the American Civil War. The student body was organized into a corps of cadets and fought with Confederate forces near Salem in December 1863. The students were outmatched and quickly forced to surrender, but the Union commander paroled them and allowed them to return to their studies. The college company was formally mustered into the Confederate Army, Virginia Reserves, on September 1, 1864, but the students did not see combat before the war ended.

=== International students ===
Roanoke enrolled its first international students in the late 19th century; the first Mexican student in 1876 and the first Japanese student in 1888. The first Korean to graduate from an American college or university, Surh Beung Kiu, graduated in 1898.

=== Coeducation ===
Roanoke became coeducational in 1930. A small number of non-degree-seeking women, mostly from Elizabeth College in Salem, were previously enrolled. Originally named Roanoke Women's College, Elizabeth was a sister Lutheran women's college destroyed by fire in 1921 and closed; the female students finished the 1921–22 academic year at Roanoke.

Roanoke opened its first women's residence hall, Smith Hall, in 1941; it has a prominent position on the John R. Turbyfill Front Quad. The Roanoke Women's College campus is its Elizabeth Campus, located approximately two miles from the Roanoke main campus.

Roanoke adopted the alumnae of Marion College, a sister Lutheran women's college in Marion, Virginia, when it closed in 1967. Marion Hall, a residence hall constructed in 1968, honors the college and its alumnae.

=== National championships ===
Roanoke athletic teams have won two national championships: the 1972 NCAA College Division men's basketball championship and the 1978 Division II men's lacrosse championship. Roanoke's third national championship occurred in 2001 when student Casey Smith won an individual championship in the Division III women's 10,000m track and field event. In 2009, student Robin Yerkes secured Roanoke's fourth national championship when she won an individual championship in the Division III women's 400m track and field event. Mark Samuel won a D3 National Wrestling Championship in March 2025

=== Sesquicentennial ===
Roanoke experienced exceptional growth in the 1980s and 1990s. Two campaign plans, the 1992 Sesquicentennial Campaign and the 2002 Plan, also known as "The Difference", were successfully completed with over $150 million raised. The campaigns financed the renovation and construction of numerous facilities including the library, the student center, and the arts and performance center.

Roanoke's tenth president, and first female president, Sabine O'Hara, took office in 2004.

=== Leaders ===
==== Principals of Virginia Institute, 1842–1853 ====
- David F. Bittle, 1842–1845
- Christopher C. Baughman, 1845–1853

==== Presidents of Roanoke College, 1853 – Present ====
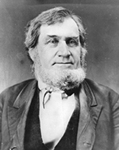
David F. Bittle, first Principal of Virginia Institute and first President of Roanoke College

- David F. Bittle, 1853–1876
- Thomas W. Dosh, 1877–1878
- Julius D. Dreher, 1878–1903
- John A. Morehead, 1903–1920
- Charles J. Smith, 1920–1949
- H. Sherman Oberly, 1949–1963
- Perry F. Kendig, 1963–1975
- Norman D. Fintel, 1975–1989
- David M. Gring, 1989–2004
- Sabine U. O'Hara, 2004–2007
- Michael C. Maxey, 2007–2022
- Frank Shushok Jr., 2022–present

== Lutheran heritage ==
Established in 1842, Roanoke is the second-oldest (Gettysburg College is the oldest) Lutheran-affiliated college in the United States and is associated with three synods of the Evangelical Lutheran Church in America: the Virginia Synod, the Metropolitan Washington, D.C. Synod, and the West Virginia–Western Maryland Synod. The Virginia Synod is headquartered in Bittle Hall, the college's first library now occupied by the Bishop of the Virginia Synod.

Historically, the college has had a small Lutheran population. Roanoke's student body represents numerous religious denominations; Roman Catholicism is the most prevalent, and Lutherans total less than ten percent.

== Academics ==
=== Admissions ===
U.S. News & World Report evaluates Roanoke admissions as "selective". For 2023, the middle range scores of enrolled students were 3.1 to 4.0 GPA, 1150–1270 SAT, and 22–28 ACT. In 2023, Roanoke awarded $36 million in merit-based scholarships, awarded financial aid for those completing the FAFSA in an average of $32,000 for each student, and awards scholarships in music, theater, art, as well as fellowships in areas of student interest.

=== Rankings ===
Academic rankings

Liberal arts
- U.S. News & World Report: 130
- Washington Monthly: 196

National
- Forbes: 462
- WSJ/College Pulse: 364

For 2024, U.S. News & World Report ranked Roanoke tied for #130 out of 211 National Liberal Arts Colleges and #167 in Top Performers on Social Mobility.

=== Accreditation and courses of study ===
Roanoke is accredited by the Southern Association of Colleges and Schools to award bachelor's degrees in arts, science, and business administration. In addition, the business administration program is accredited by the Association of Collegiate Business Schools and Programs; the chemistry program is accredited by the American Chemical Society; the teacher licensure program is accredited by the Council for the Accreditation of Educator Preparation; and the athletic training program is accredited by the Commission on Accreditation of Allied Health Education Programs.

Roanoke offers 35 majors with 57 minors and concentrations. The college also offers a dual degree engineering program that leads to a Roanoke liberal arts degree and an engineering degree from Virginia Tech.

=== Departments and programs ===
Roanoke has 16 academic departments:

- Biology
- Business Administration and Economics
- Cannabis Studies
- Chemistry
- Education
- English
- Environmental Studies
- Fine Arts
- Health and Human Performance
- History
- Math, Computer Science, and Physics
- Modern Languages
- Psychology
- Public Affairs
- Religion and Philosophy
- Sociology and Public Health

==== Pre-Professional programs ====
Roanoke has eight pre-professional programs:

- Dentistry
- Engineering
- Law
- Medicine
- Ministry
- Pharmacy
- Veterinary Medicine

==== Honors program ====
Each year, Roanoke accepts approximately 35 incoming freshmen and first-term sophomores to become members of the Honors Program. These students complete the Honors Curriculum in lieu of the Roanoke College Core Curriculum. Honors students are offered numerous special learning experiences including plays, lectures, concerts, and service projects.

=== Roanoke College Seal ===
The blue shield on the seal emblazoned with a gold cross represents the College's strong history and relationship with the Christian church. The white dogwood flower represents the Commonwealth of Virginia. The Lamp above symbolizes the lamp of knowledge. The motto, "Palmam Qui Meruit Ferat", means in English, "Let he who earns the palm bear it". The palm is symbolic of the honor-laden palm leaf given during antiquity in Greece.

== Student body ==
Roanoke has approximately 2,000 students who represent approximately 40 states and 30 countries. Approximately 50% of the student body is from Virginia; the majority of out-of-state students are from Connecticut, Maryland, Massachusetts, New Jersey, New York, North Carolina, and Pennsylvania.

== Faculty ==
Roanoke has a tenure-track faculty of 164 (95% hold the highest degrees in their fields) plus a variety of adjunct professors selected from the business, political, and other communities for their subject matter expertise.

=== Notable faculty ===
- Adrian Blevins (born 1964), poet
- Walter Compton (1912-1959), broadcaster
- G. Samantha Rosenthal (born 1983), historian, activist, and author
- Henry S. Taylor (born 1942), poet
- Harry L. Wilson (born 1957), political scientist

== Library ==
Roanoke's Fintel Library, named after Norman Fintel, eighth president of the college, has a collection of over half a million items. Roanoke and nearby Hollins University have a reciprocal borrowing agreement, expanding the size of the library collection by another 300,000 items.

== Student life ==
=== Student organizations ===
Roanoke has over 100 student organizations that provide learning experiences outside the classroom. Students may choose from academic, cultural, religious, service, and social organizations including nine Greek organizations.

The Student Government Association at Roanoke exists to give students a voice in the administration. It is the highest level student organization. It is made up of an executive board (President, Vice President, Secretary, Treasurer, and Attorney General) and the Senate (41 members).

Student publications and media opportunities include the Brackety-Ack campus newspaper, a literary magazine titled On Concept's Edge, the Roanoke Review literary journal, and the student-operated radio station named WRKE-LP. Intramural sports are also offered.

=== Greek life ===
Roanoke has recognized chapters of nine social and two service Greek organizations. The Greek organizations operate in college-owned housing. Roanoke's original fraternity row has been converted into residence halls. Roanoke's Greek organizations have a prominent role on campus, but are not dominant; approximately 25% of the Roanoke student body participates in Greek life. Aside from the formal and official fraternities, undergrounds are also present.

== Campus ==
=== Quadrangles ===
- Main Campus Complex, Roanoke College
- U.S. National Register of Historic Places
- Virginia Landmarks Register
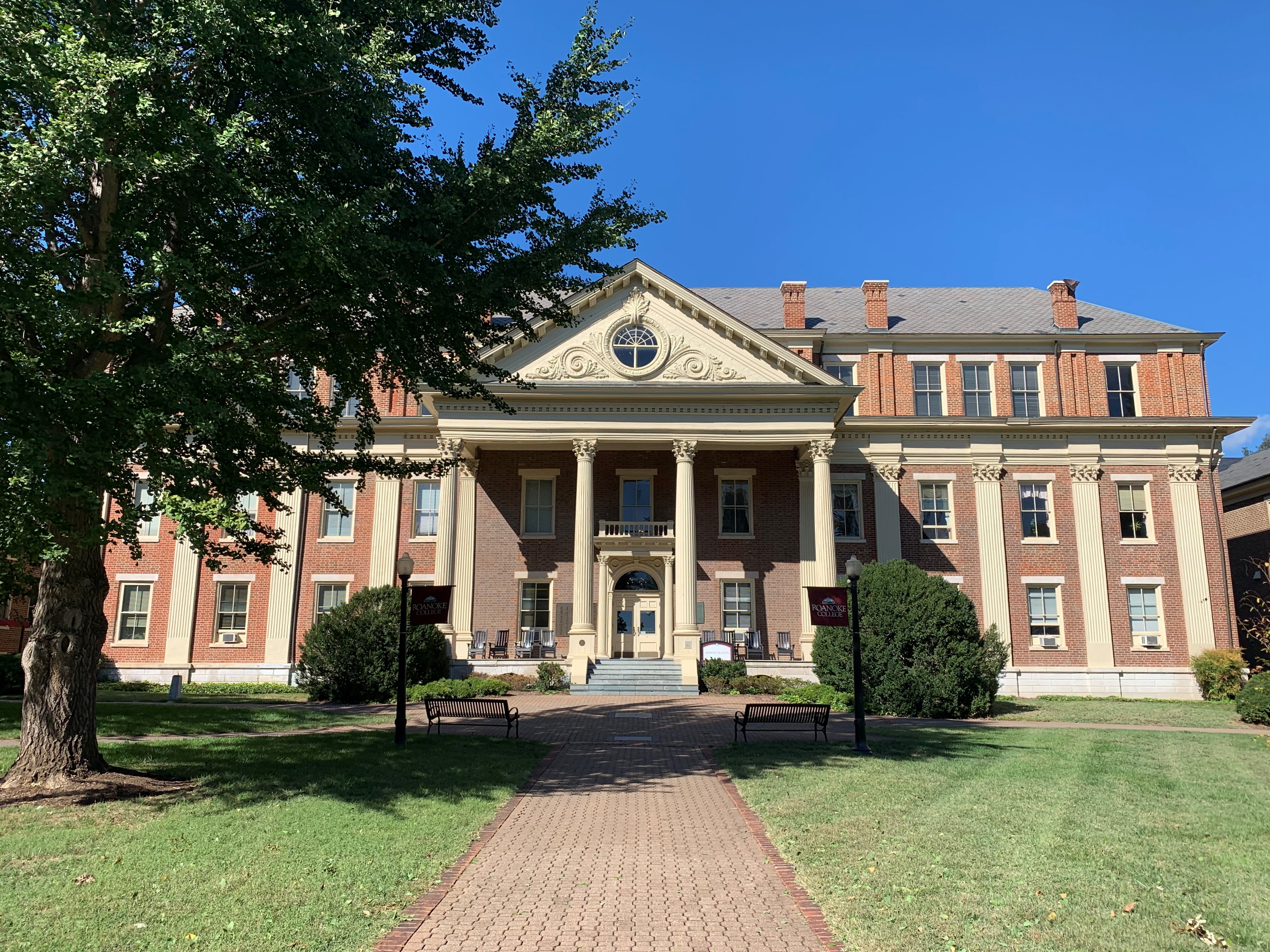
- The Administration Building, constructed in 1848, listed on the National Register of Historic Places

- Location within Virginia Location within the United States
- Location: Roanoke College, Salem, Virginia
- Coordinates: 37°17′45″N 80°3′20″W
- Built: 1852
- Architect: Deyerle, Joseph
- Architectural style: Greek Revival, Gothic
- NRHP reference No.: 73002226
- VLR No.: 129-0005

Significant dates
- Added to NRHP: March 7, 1973
- Designated VLR: May 16, 1972

Roanoke's main campus is relatively self-contained with most academic buildings and residence halls built around three quadrangles: the John R. Turbyfill Front Quad, the Back Quad (central campus), and the Athletic Quad, which surrounds the college's newest athletic facilities and residence halls. The campus is lined with brick sidewalks and has been recognized for its landscaping and views of the surrounding mountains. The largest Rock Elm in the United States is located near the library. The only Alice Aycock sculpture in Virginia is on the Back Quad.

=== Architecture ===
The campus architecture is a blend of traditional collegiate and modern styles. The Administration Building, constructed in 1848 with bricks made on-site, and six other buildings, Miller Hall, Trout Hall, Bittle Hall, Monterey House, West Hall, and the Old Salem Post Office are listed on the National Register of Historic Places.

=== National Register of Historic Places ===
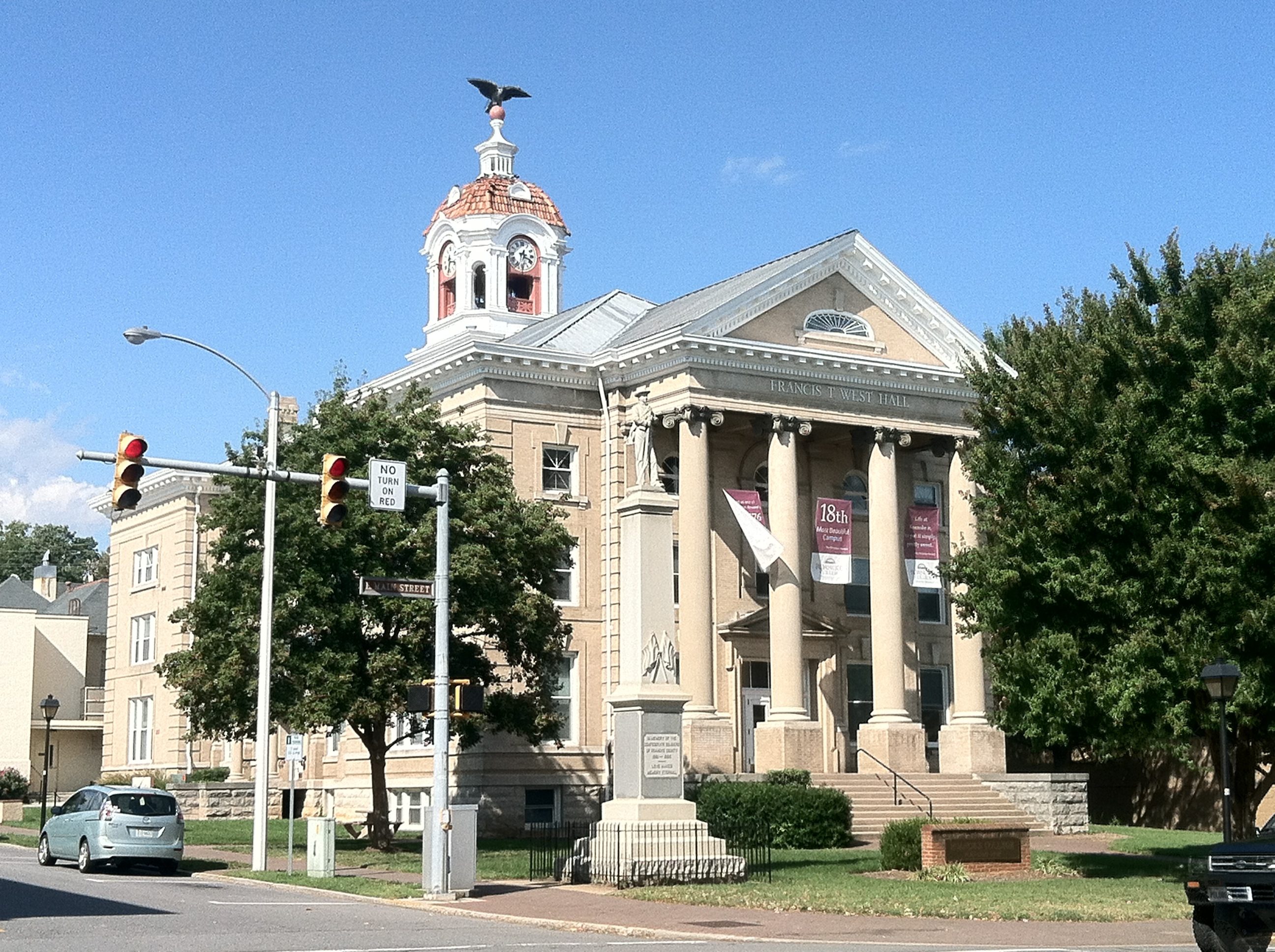
Old Roanoke County Courthouse (now Francis T. West Hall) and Confederate monument

Seven college buildings are listed on the National Register of Historic Places. The buildings, with year of construction, are:

- The Administration Building (1848)
- Miller Hall (1857)
- Trout Hall (1867)
- Bittle Hall (1879)
- Monterey House (1853)
- West Hall (former Roanoke County Courthouse) (1910)
- The Post Office (former Salem city post office) (1923)

=== Residence halls ===
Approximately 70% of the student body resides on campus.

=== President's House ===
The President's House is in a residential district approximately one-half-mile north of the Roanoke campus on North Market Street. The colonial revival mansion, one of the largest private homes in the area, was constructed in the late 1930s. It was purchased in the mid-1950s by John P. Fishwick, president of the Norfolk and Western Railway and a Roanoke & Harvard Law School alumnus, and was acquired by the college in 1968.

In April 2011, the President's House and its garden were opened to the public during Virginia's Historic Garden Week. Selection of sites to participate is very competitive; only five Roanoke Valley residences were featured in 2011.

=== Elizabeth Campus ===
Additional college facilities, mostly residence halls and athletic fields, are located on the site of Elizabeth College, a Lutheran women's college that closed in 1922. The area, approximately two miles east of the main campus, is referred to as Elizabeth Campus. Houses for Kappa Alpha Order, Pi Kappa Alpha, Pi Lambda Phi and Sigma Chi are on Elizabeth Campus along with Elizabeth Hall, a large residence hall with apartments for non-freshman students.

=== College Avenue – Main Street ===
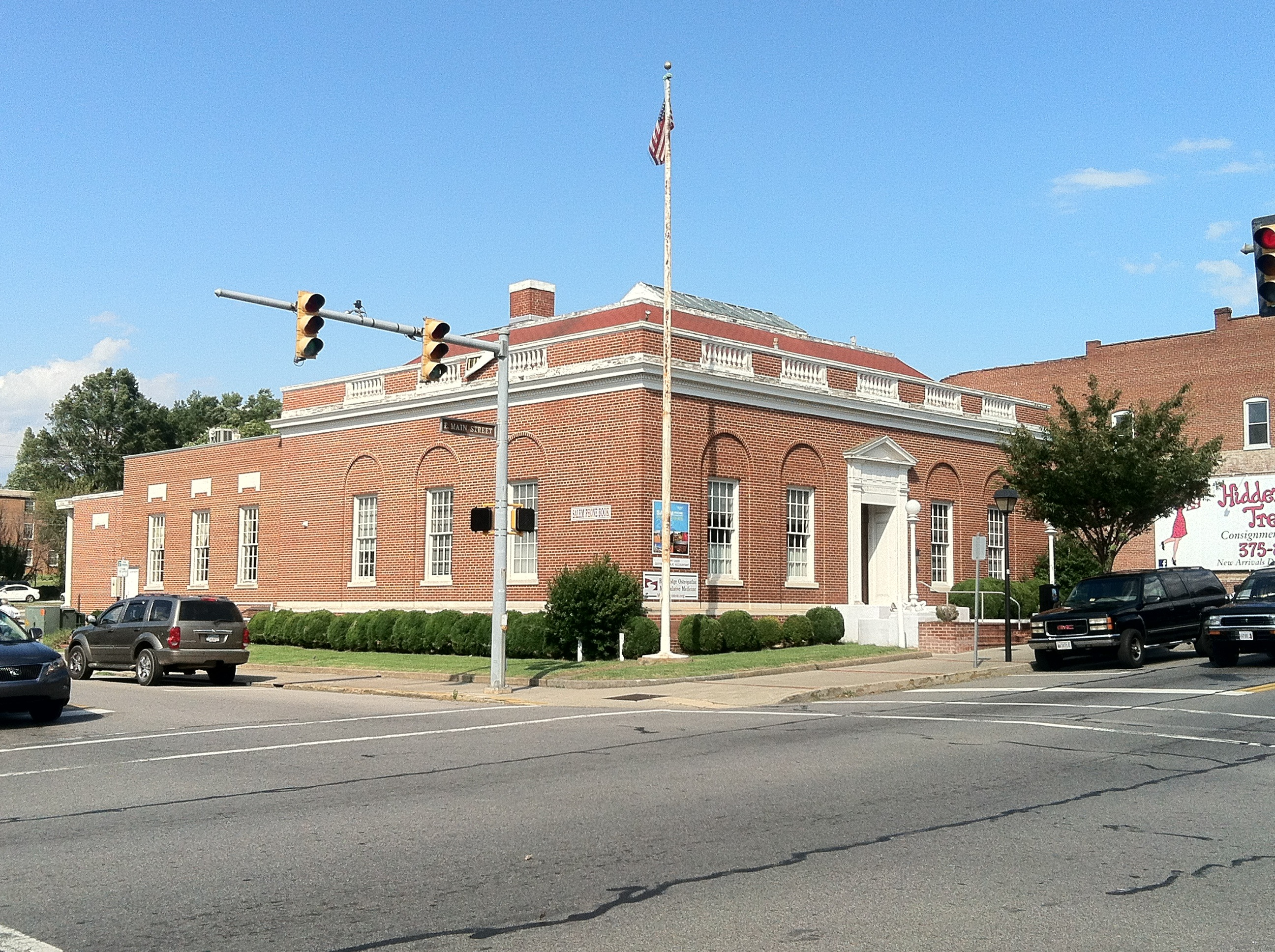
The Old Salem Post Office Building, one of seven college buildings listed on the National Register of Historic Places

Roanoke acquired three office buildings on College Avenue across from West Hall in 2005–06. The buildings have been renovated to provide classroom and office space for various college departments. With the acquisitions, the Roanoke campus occupies both sides of College Avenue from Main Street north to the traditional campus entrance.

In 2013, Roanoke purchased two Main Street buildings: the Bank Building, located on the corner of College Avenue and Main Street across from West Hall, and the Old Salem Post Office, located on the corner of Main and Market Streets. Roanoke had leased the bank building for several years preceding the purchase and will continue to use it for academic purposes. The post office building, listed on the National Register of Historic Places, is the seventh building on the Roanoke campus listed on the national register; it will be renovated for academic use.

=== Recent construction ===
Roanoke opened a new 200-bed residence hall in 2012; the building, the college's second LEED-certified building, completes the third quadrangle along with Kerr Stadium and Caldwell, Beamer, and Ritter Halls. The college previously completed an eight-court competition tennis complex on the Elizabeth Campus and a large parking lot on the main campus; the projects replaced existing facilities and made land available for the new residence hall. In addition, McClanahan Hall on the Elizabeth Campus reopened in 2012 as the Sigma Chi house; the Sigma Chi house on the main campus was razed and is now green space.

Roanoke's most recent major project opened in 2016; the Morris M. Cregger Center is a multi-purpose athletic and recreation center with a 2,500 seat performance arena (basketball and volleyball), a 200-meter indoor track and field facility, athletic department and faculty offices, classrooms, fitness facilities, and a sports medicine clinic. The center is on the north side of campus; Bowman Hall, a large residence hall that opened in 1965, was razed to make land available. Kerr Stadium was incorporated as a part of the western facade so the two facilities form a unified complex; the center overlooks the stadium.

Roanoke, in anticipation of future growth, has purchased a significant number of private homes on Market Street adjacent to campus, which will provide land for expansion.

== Athletics ==
Roanoke athletic teams are the Maroons. The college is a member of the Division III level of the National Collegiate Athletic Association (NCAA), primarily competing in the Old Dominion Athletic Conference (ODAC) since the 1976–77 academic year.

Roanoke competes in 23 intercollegiate varsity sports: Men's sports include baseball, basketball, cross country, golf, lacrosse, soccer, swimming, tennis, track & field (indoor and outdoor), volleyball (starting in 2022–23) and wrestling; while women's sports include basketball, cross country, field hockey, lacrosse, soccer, softball, swimming, tennis, track & field (indoor and outdoor) and volleyball.

The college's athletic colors are maroon and gray. Roanoke is particularly noted for the strength of its men's and women's lacrosse programs and women's track and field.

In June 2023, it was announced that Roanoke would be reinstating the college's football program, which has not played since 1942. The Maroons will begin play as NCAA Division III Independents in 2024 becoming full ODAC members in 2025.

=== Accomplishments ===
National championships

Roanoke teams have won two national championships: the 1972 NCAA College Division men's basketball championship and the 1978 Division II men's lacrosse championship. In 2001, Roanoke student Casey Smith won an individual national championship in the Division III women's 10,000m track and field event. In 2009, student Robin Yerkes secured Roanoke's fourth national championship when she won an individual championship in the Division III women's 400m track and field event. Yerkes is the most decorated athlete ever to graduate from Roanoke, earning 12 All-American honors in multiple events. In 2025, Mark Samuel won the NCAA Division III Wrestling Championship.

Conference championships

Roanoke teams have won 101 conference championships as of May 2013 (47 in men's sports, 54 in women's sports) since the college joined the ODAC as a founding member in 1976. Roanoke has won more conference championships than any other ODAC school in men's lacrosse with 18 titles and women's basketball with 13 titles. Roanoke, Hampden–Sydney College, and Randolph-Macon College are tied for the most conference championships in men's basketball with 10 titles each.

== Roanoke and the railway ==
The Norfolk and Western Railway, now Norfolk Southern Corporation, has provided career opportunities for many Roanoke alumni; the NWR was headquartered in Roanoke until 1982 and is a major employer in western Virginia. Roanoke graduates who have advanced to leadership positions include Stuart T. Saunders and John Fishwick, former presidents of the NWR; John R. Turbyfill, retired vice-chairman, NSC; John S. Shannon, retired executive vice president, NSC; and William T. Ross Sr., retired assistant vice president, NWR.

Roanoke has strong historic ties to the railway due in part to its alumni connections. The NWR named a Pullman car "Roanoke College" in honor of the college and Fishwick's Salem residence is now the college President's House. Saunders and Turbyfill served as chairman of Roanoke's board of trustees. In 2007, David R. Goode, retired chairman, NSC, endowed Roanoke's Center for Learning and Teaching in honor of his father, sister, and brother-in-law, all Roanoke graduates.
