= John Bemrose =

Canadian writer

John Bemrose is a Canadian arts journalist, novelist, poet and playwright. His arts reviews have appeared in Maclean's, The Globe and Mail, the National Post and on CBC Radio.

Bemrose was born and raised in Paris, Ontario, where his father, Fred Bemrose, a 2009 recipient of the Lieutenant Governor's Award for Lifetime Achievement, remains the town historian. He graduated from the Victoria University in the University of Toronto in 1970, where he published early poems in Acta Victoriana.

His debut novel, The Island Walkers, was published in 2003. It was a nominee for that year's Giller Prize, as well as making the longlist for the Man Booker Prize.

He has also published a play, Mother Moon, and two volumes of poetry.

His second novel, The Last Woman, was published in 2009 by McClelland & Stewart. It is set in Ontario's cottage country and is being touted by its publisher as a vehicle for the vivid characterizations for which he's become known.

== Reviews ==
The Times Literary Supplement said in a review of The Island Walkers: "Bemrose's characters […] live as real people live: contradictory, capable of kindness and disdain, of near-simultaneous love and hate, of gross betrayal…."
