= Roanoke Maroons =

Athletic teams that represent Roanoke College in Virginia, US

- University: Roanoke College
- Nickname: Maroons
- NCAA: Division III
- Conference: Old Dominion Athletic Conference
- Athletic director: Curtis Campbell
- Location: Salem, Virginia
- Varsity teams: 28
- Football stadium: Salem Stadium
- Basketball arena: Cregger Center
- Baseball stadium: Salem Memorial Ballpark
- Softball stadium: James I. Moyer Sports Complex
- Soccer stadium: Donald J. Kerr Stadium
- Aquatics center: Salem Family YMCA
- Lacrosse stadium: Donald J. Kerr Stadium
- Tennis venue: Elizabeth Campus Complex
- Outdoor track and field venue: C. Homer Bast Track/Alumni Field
- Colors: Maroon and Gray
- Mascot: Rooney
- Website: roanokemaroons.com
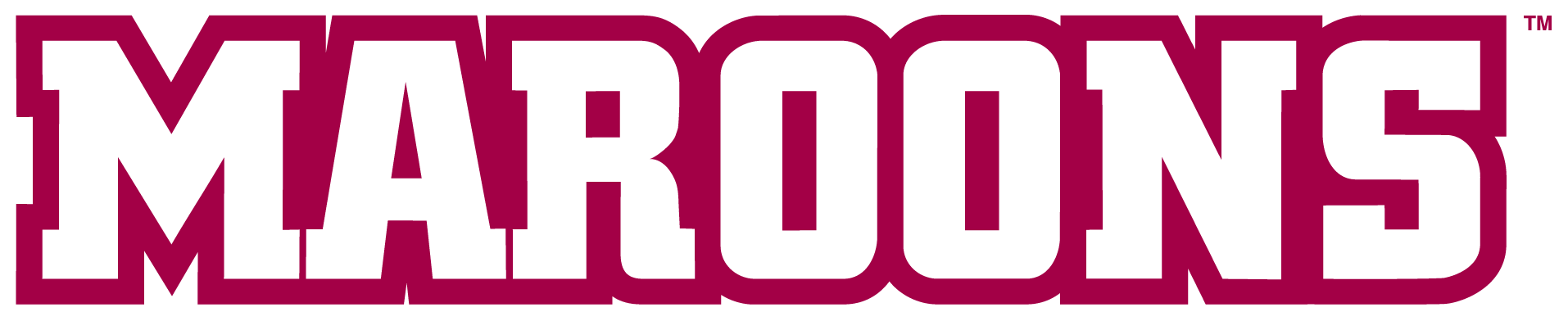

The Roanoke Maroons are the athletic teams that represent Roanoke College, located in Salem, Virginia, a suburban independent city adjacent to Roanoke, Virginia.

Roanoke is an NCAA Division III member competing in the Old Dominion Athletic Conference; the Maroons were a founding member of the conference in 1976. The college fields teams in 14 men's and 14 women's sports.

== History ==
Roanoke athletics began in 1870 when the college fielded its first baseball team. In 1900, Roanoke helped serve as a founding member of the Virginia Intercollegiate Athletic Association, but quickly left the association. Roanoke later re-joined as a non-football member from 1915 to 1918. The men's basketball program, added in 1911, received national recognition in 1939 when the team finished third in the National Invitational Tournament, the premiere postseason tournament of that era; and with more than 1,300 wins (almost 2,000 games played; better than 60% winning percentage over more than 90 years) is among the most successful in the nation. The "Five Smart Boys" of the 1937 through 1939 seasons were Guard John Wagner; 'Bounding' Bob Lieb; Forwards Paul Rice; Gene Studebaker and Center Bob Sheffield. Frankie Allen, arguably the greatest men's basketball player in Virginia college sports (2,780 points and 1,758 rebounds), graduated from Roanoke in 1971.

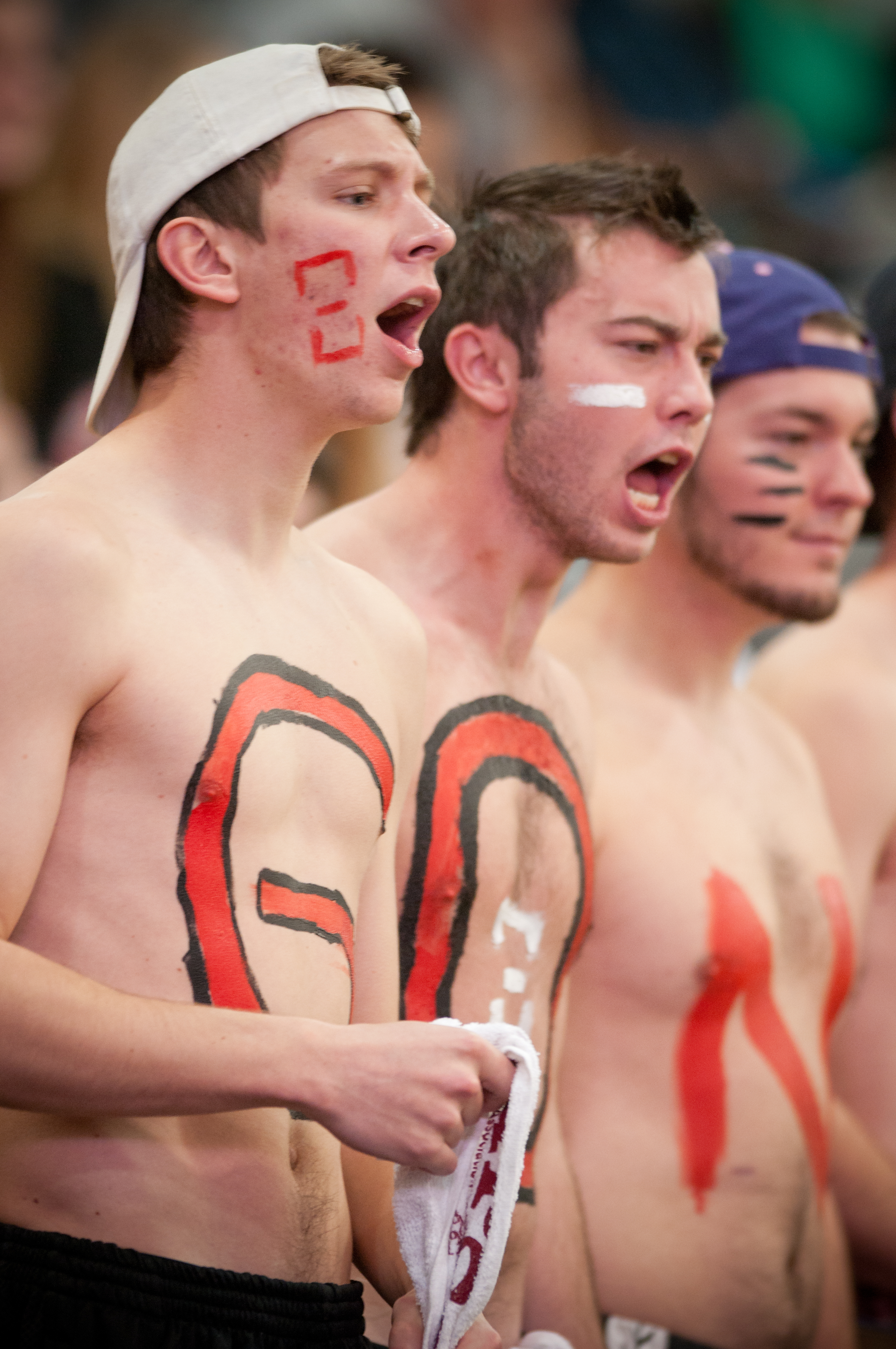
Roanoke students cheering

Men's lacrosse and men's basketball are two of the school's most popular, and historically most successful sports at the college. However, a number of other teams have made significant NCAA tournament runs and claimed ODAC titles in recent years. Most notably, the school's baseball team in 2017, who entered the ODAC Tournament as the conference's 6th seed, went on a run to win the title before sweeping the South Region and making an appearance in the Division III College World Series in Appleton, Wisconsin. The team finished the season #3 in the national rankings. With the addition of men's volleyball, a sport not sponsored by the ODAC, Roanoke joined the Continental Volleyball Conference: a Division III men's volleyball conference that two fellow ODAC members call home for their men's volleyball programs (Eastern Mennonite and Randolph-Macon). In November of 2022, Scott Allison announced that he will retire at the end of the 2022-23 academic year. Coach Allison contributed 37 total years of service to the college serving as Head Men's Lacrosse Coach in the 1987 and 1988 seasons, the Head Women's Tennis Coach in the 1989 season and most notably as the Head Men's Soccer Coach from 1986-2012 and the school's director of athletics from 1993 until his retirement in 2023. In late May 2023, then Morehouse College athletic director and industry veteran Curtis Campbell was named the next director of athletics at Roanoke College.

As of May 2026, teams at Roanoke College have won 109 conference championships (53 in men's sports, 56 in women's sports) since the college joined the ODAC as a founding member in 1976. Currently, Roanoke owns more conference championships than any other school in the ODAC in men's lacrosse with 18 titles and women's basketball with 13 titles. Roanoke and Hampden-Sydney are currently tied for the most ODAC titles in men's basketball with 11 each.

== Varsity teams ==
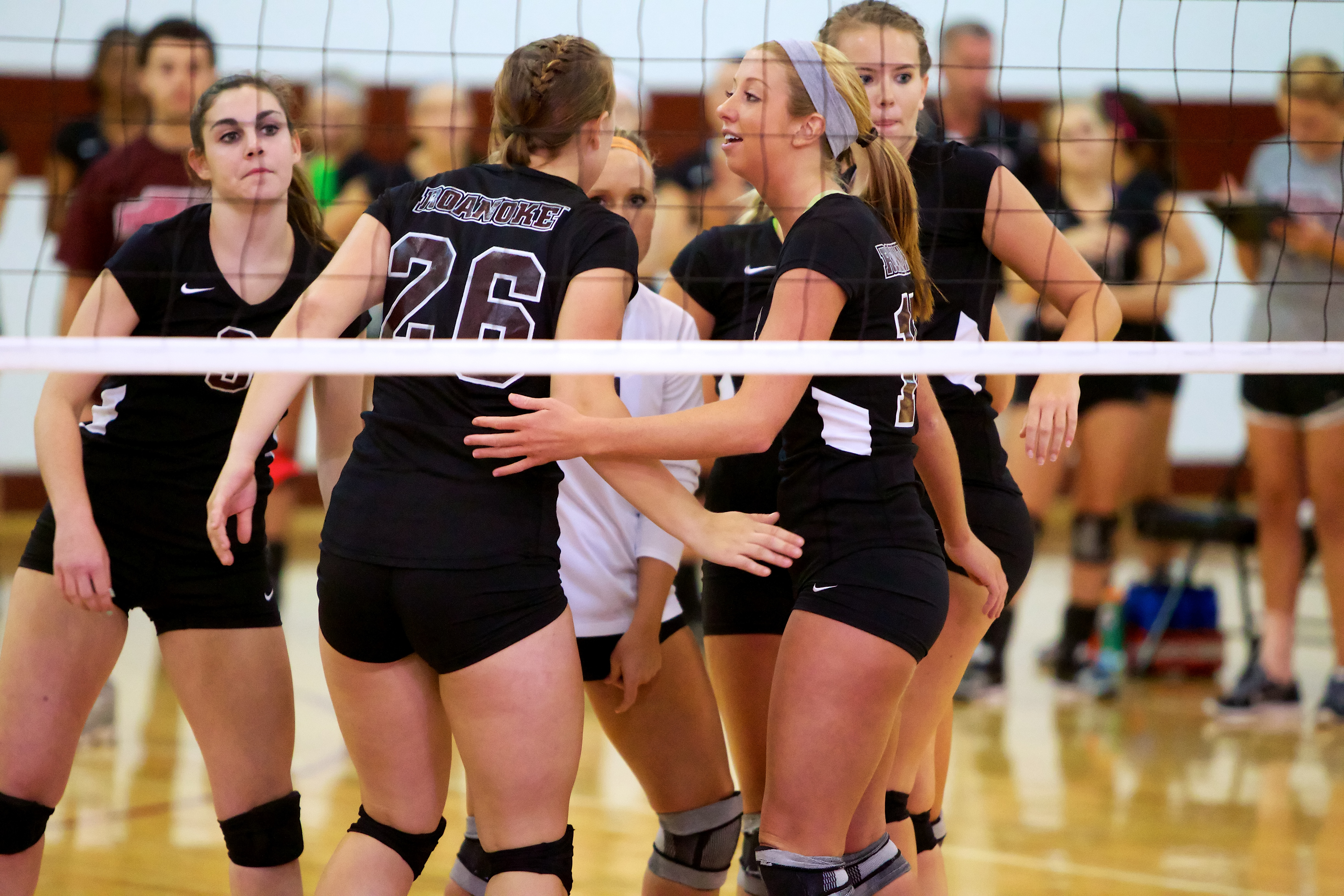
Women's Volleyball

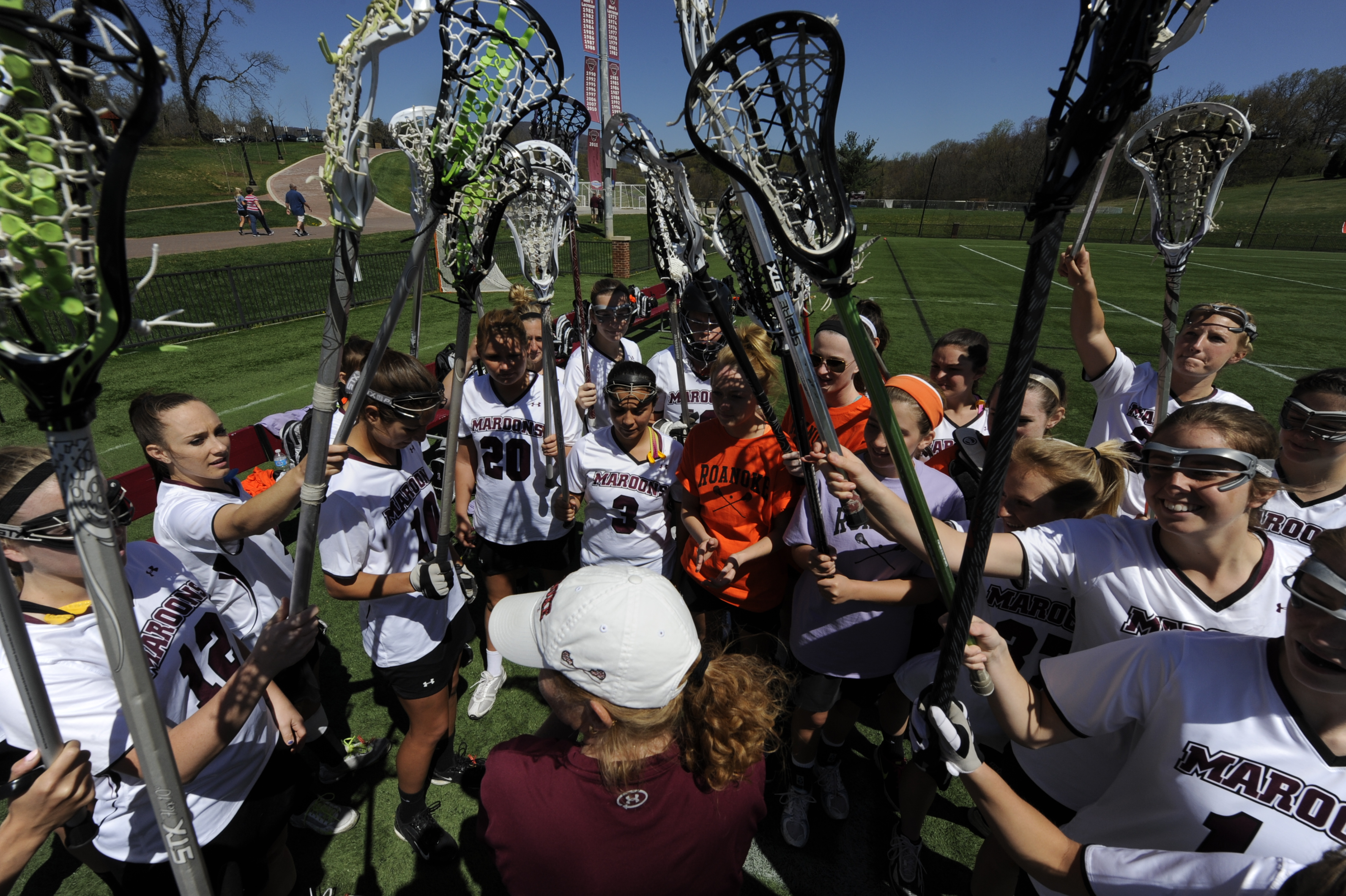
Women's Lacrosse

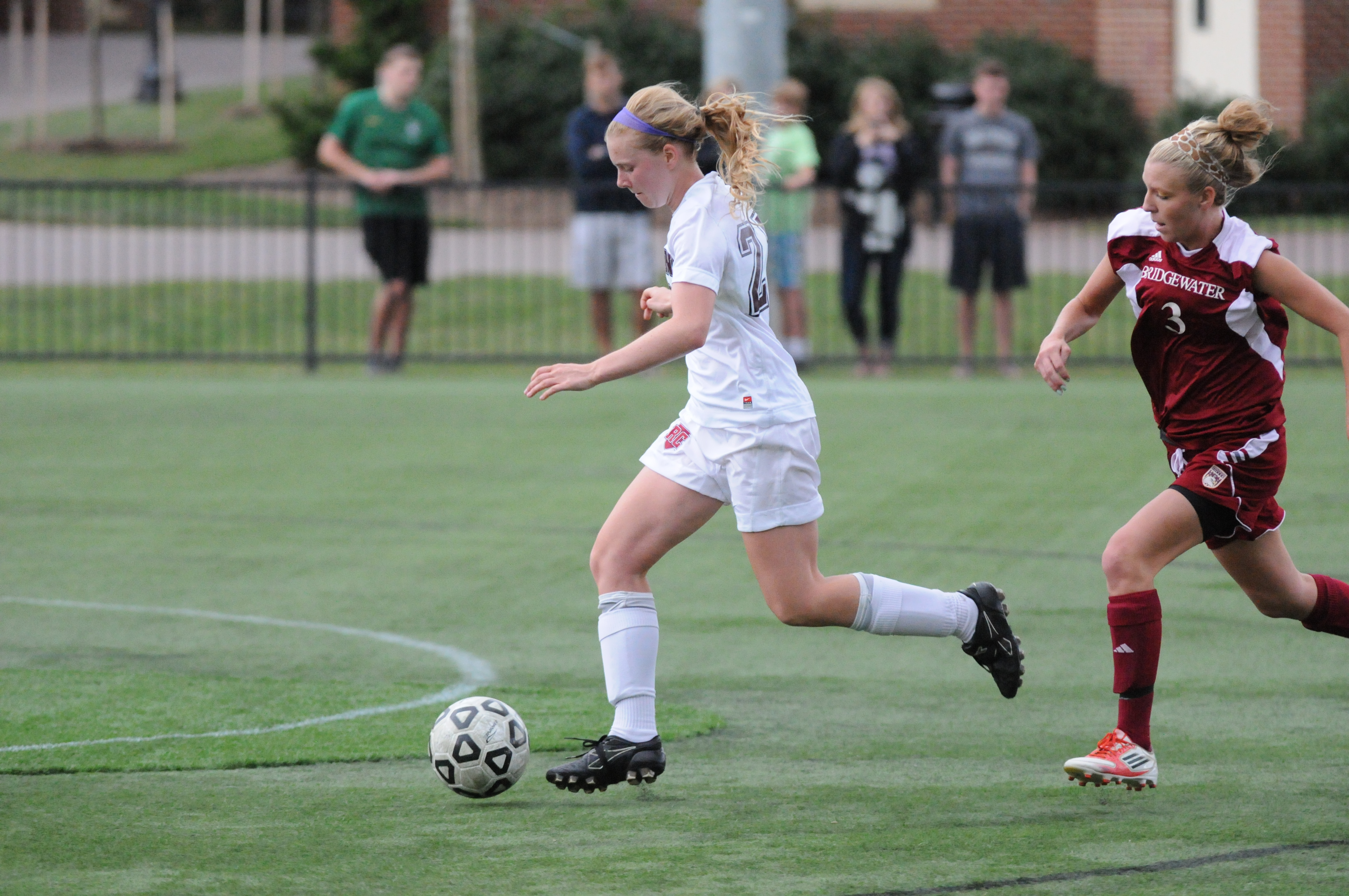
Women's Soccer

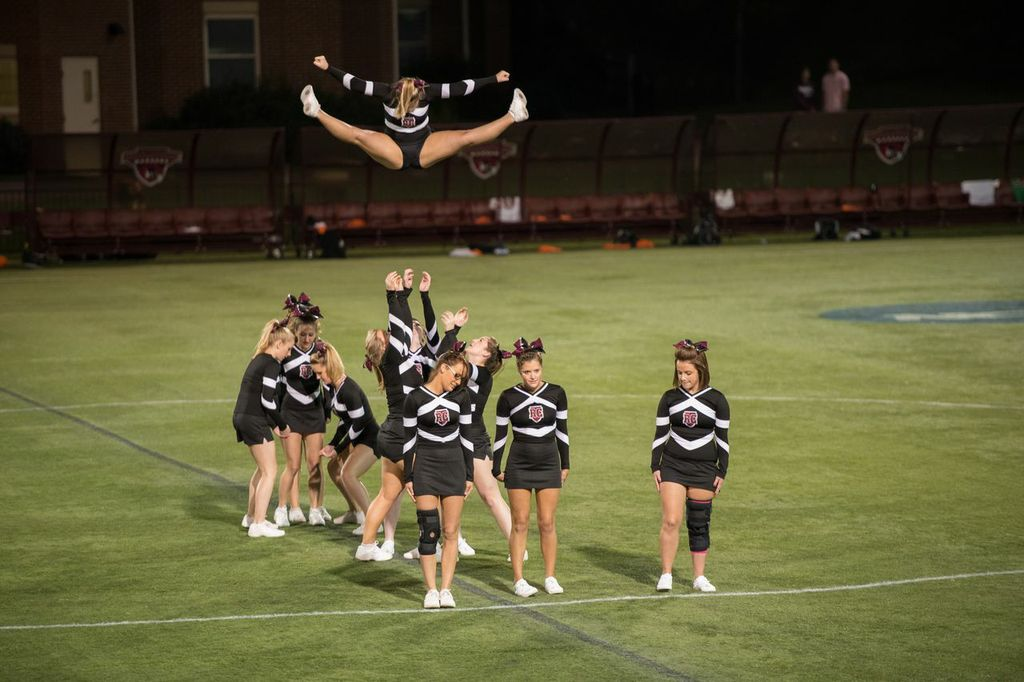
Cheerleaders

Men's sports	Women's sports
Baseball	Basketball
Basketball	Competitive Cheer
Cross Country	Cross Country
Cycling	Cycling
Football	Field Hockey
Golf	Golf
Lacrosse	Lacrosse
Soccer	Soccer
Swimming	Softball
Tennis	Swimming
Track and Field (Indoor & Outdoor)	Tennis
Volleyball	Track and Field (Indoor & Outdoor)
Wrestling	Volleyball

=== Football ===
Roanoke's football program was discontinued during World War II after more than 60 years of competition. Initially a club sport, the first varsity game occurred in 1892 against Allegheny Institute. The college's final game was played against Catawba College on November 13, 1942, which resulted in a 42–0 loss.

In 1985, the Salem city government constructed a 7,157-seat football stadium, Salem Stadium adjacent to Roanoke's Elizabeth Campus, two miles from the main campus, location of athletic fields and residence halls. Constructed for the football team at nearby Salem High School where many hoped the college would revive its football program and that the team would play in the stadium, but the college declined. The stadium has hosted the Amos Alonzo Stagg Bowl game from 1993 to 2017.

In the spring of 2023, Roanoke College raised $1.3 million to reinstate football which returned as a club team during the 2024 season and obtained varsity status beginning in the 2025 season. In addition to reinstating football, Roanoke added varsity cheerleading to its athletic department and a marching band program.

=== Rivalries ===
Roanoke College and Washington and Lee University have been rivals for nearly 150 years. The rivalry is fueled by a long history of competition; the schools have competed against each other since the 1870s. The rivalry is also influenced by conference affiliation and geography; the schools are both charter members of the Old Dominion Athletic Conference and are located about 50 miles from each other along Interstate 81. Both schools historically have had nationally ranked men's lacrosse teams and have been ranked in the top twenty when meeting late in the season. Women's lacrosse games with Washington and Lee also draw much interest as both schools have had very successful programs and have competed against each other in the ODAC Championship game on multiple occasions. In addition to Washington and Lee, rivalries with the University of Lynchburg, Hampden-Sydney College, Randolph-Macon College, and Bridgewater College draw much interest among Roanoke fans; all of which are members of the Old Dominion Athletic Conference.

Roanoke and Virginia Tech were rivals in the late 19th and early 20th centuries when Virginia Tech was a small college. In 1877, the schools competed in Virginia Tech's first intercollegiate baseball game (Virginia Tech won 53–13), and in 1896, Virginia Tech first wore its current athletic colors – Chicago Maroon and Burnt Orange – in a football game against Roanoke. In 1895, Roanoke and Virginia Tech were charter members of the now defunct Virginia Intercollegiate Athletic Association along with Randolph-Macon College, the University of Richmond, and the College of William and Mary, and in 1926, Roanoke and Virginia Tech played the inaugural football game at Virginia Tech's Miles Stadium.

=== School colors ===
Roanoke has two sets of school colors, blue and gold for academic use and maroon and gray for athletic use. This dates to 1907 when the baseball team needed new uniforms, but could not obtain any in blue and gold. Maroon and gray uniforms were purchased as a substitute. Within a few years, maroon and gray were adopted as Roanoke's official athletic colors. The college athletic nickname became Maroons as well. In recent years, black and white have been added as accent colors so Roanoke athletic uniforms are often maroon, gray, black, and white.

=== Nickname and mascot ===
Roanoke's athletic nickname is the Maroons and the mascot is Rooney, a maroon-tailed hawk. The mascot was revealed on April 17, 2009, during the annual alumni weekend festivities. Roanoke has competed as the Maroons for over a century, but it was only a color without a mascot to represent the college.

== Facilities ==
After beginning their history in the tiny, on-campus Alumni Gymnasium, the men's and women's basketball teams began playing their home games in the 6,820-seat Salem Civic Center arena in 1968. While the team had a great deal of success there and won the program's only national title while calling the Salem Civic Center home, its large size and off-campus location hindered it. In the 1980s, the school opened the 2,000-seat Bast Center located on-campus where the men's and women's basketball and volleyball teams played until 2016, when the state-of-the-art Cregger Center opened on-campus. The new arena seats 2,500 spectators and sits on a hill with magnificent views of the Blue Ridge Mountains.

The baseball team formerly played at Kiwanis Field near Elizabeth Campus, but now plays at Salem Memorial Ballpark, home stadium of the Salem RidgeYaks, Carolina League affiliate of the Boston Red Sox. The softball team plays at the nearby James I. Moyer Sports Complex, which notably has hosted the NCAA Division III Softball Championship on multiple occasions. Roanoke has made several appearances in the championship series with their most recent appearance being in 2012.

=== Home competition facilities ===
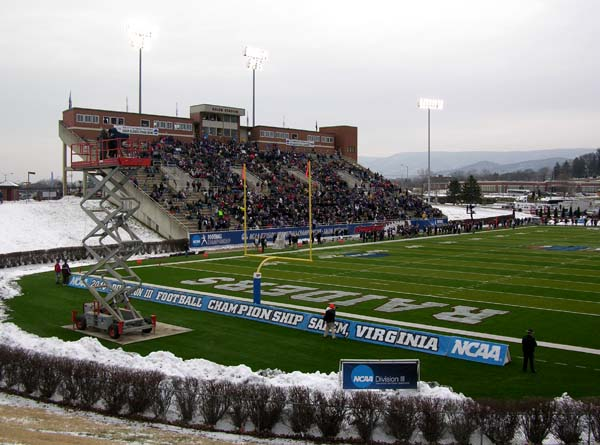
Salem Stadium, football venue

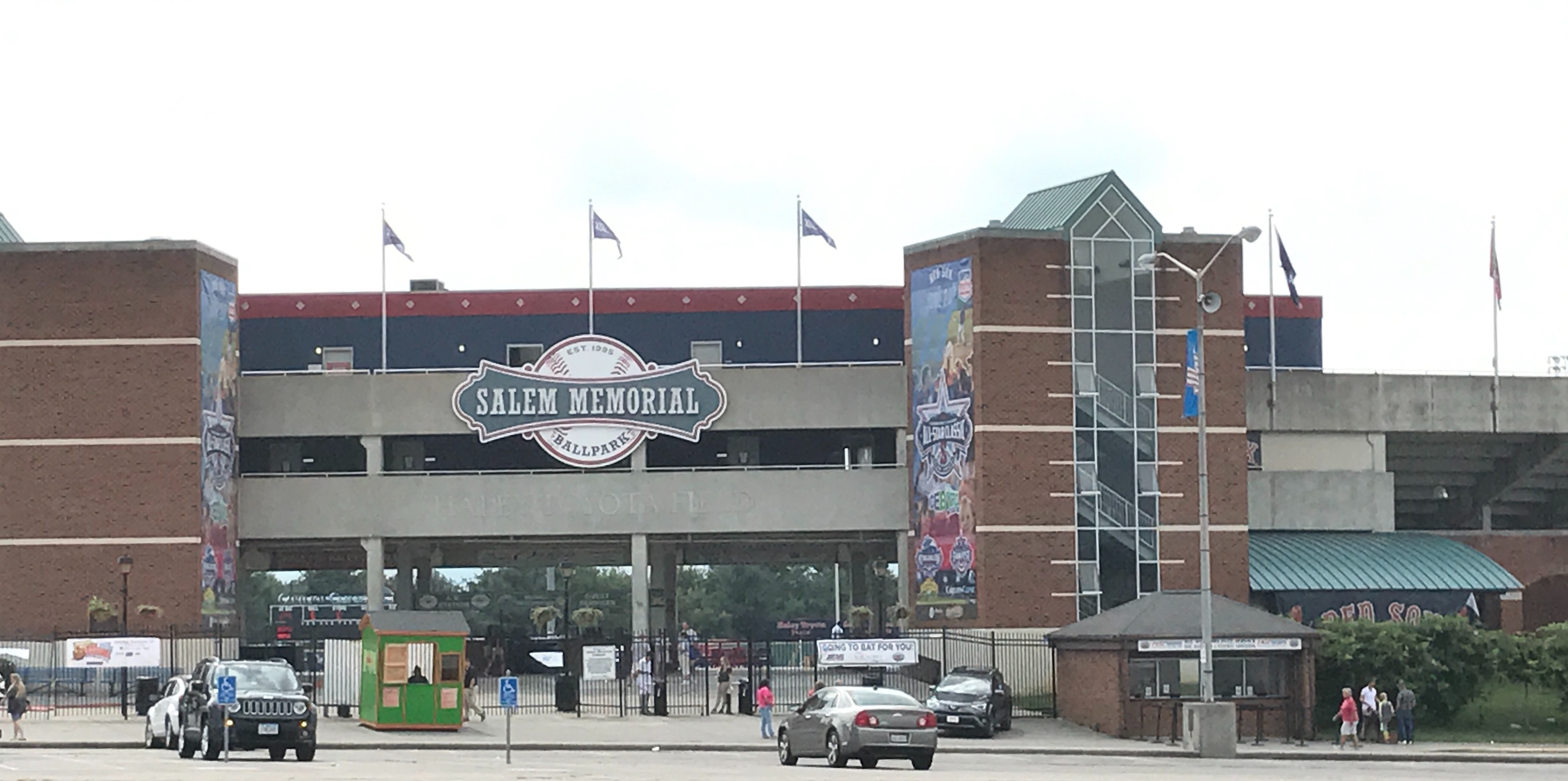
Salem Memorial Ballpark, baseball home

Venue	Sport(s)	Ref.
Salem Stadium (Note: Not property of the college but of the city of Salem.)	Football	
Cregger Center	Basketball; Track and field (indoor); Volleyball; Wrestling	
Elizabeth Campus Courts	Tennis	
Donald J. Kerr Stadium	Field Hockey; Lacrosse; Soccer	
Salem Memorial Ballpark	Baseball	
Moyer Sports Complex	Softball	
Green Hill Park (Note: Not property of the college but of Roanoke County.)	Cross Country	
Roanoke Country Club	Golf	
Salem YMCA	Swimming	
William "Dox" Doxanas Athletic Performance Center	Strength & Conditioning (Note: Formerly known as Alumni Gym and former basketball and volleyball venue (1911–66, 1977–82))	
C. Homer Bast Center	Recreational	
Belk Fitness Center	Recreational	

== Achievements ==
=== 2011–12 ===
On January 28, 2012, the men's basketball team defeated Eastern Mennonite University to win the 1,300th game in program history. Roanoke is one of only 20 NCAA Division III schools with that many victories. With the win, Head Coach Page Moir achieved 375 victories; he is the winningest coach in ODAC history.

Roanoke completed the 2011–12 academic year with two ODAC championships: women's outdoor track and field and softball. The softball championship was Roanoke's eighth in the sport, the most of any school in conference history at the time. Roanoke finished second in the conference in golf and women's lacrosse.

The softball team defeated Christopher Newport University to win the NCAA Division III Regional Championship in Newport News, Virginia and advanced to the NCAA Division III World Series. Roanoke ended the season ranked fourth in the nation after losses to Montclair State University and Linfield College.

Roanoke athletes won the top ODAC scholar-athlete of the year awards; golfer Brandon Ketron won the men's award, track athlete Sarah Witt won the women's award. Roanoke and Washington and Lee University are the only schools to win both awards in the same year. In addition, 91 Roanoke student-athletes were named to the ODAC All-Academic team.

Shelley Olds, a 2003 graduate of Roanoke College, finished seventh in the women's road race at the 2012 Olympic Games in London, the best result for an American cyclist since 1992. Olds served as captain of the women's soccer team at Roanoke; she is a three-time national champion in two cycling disciplines, road and track.

=== 2012–13 ===
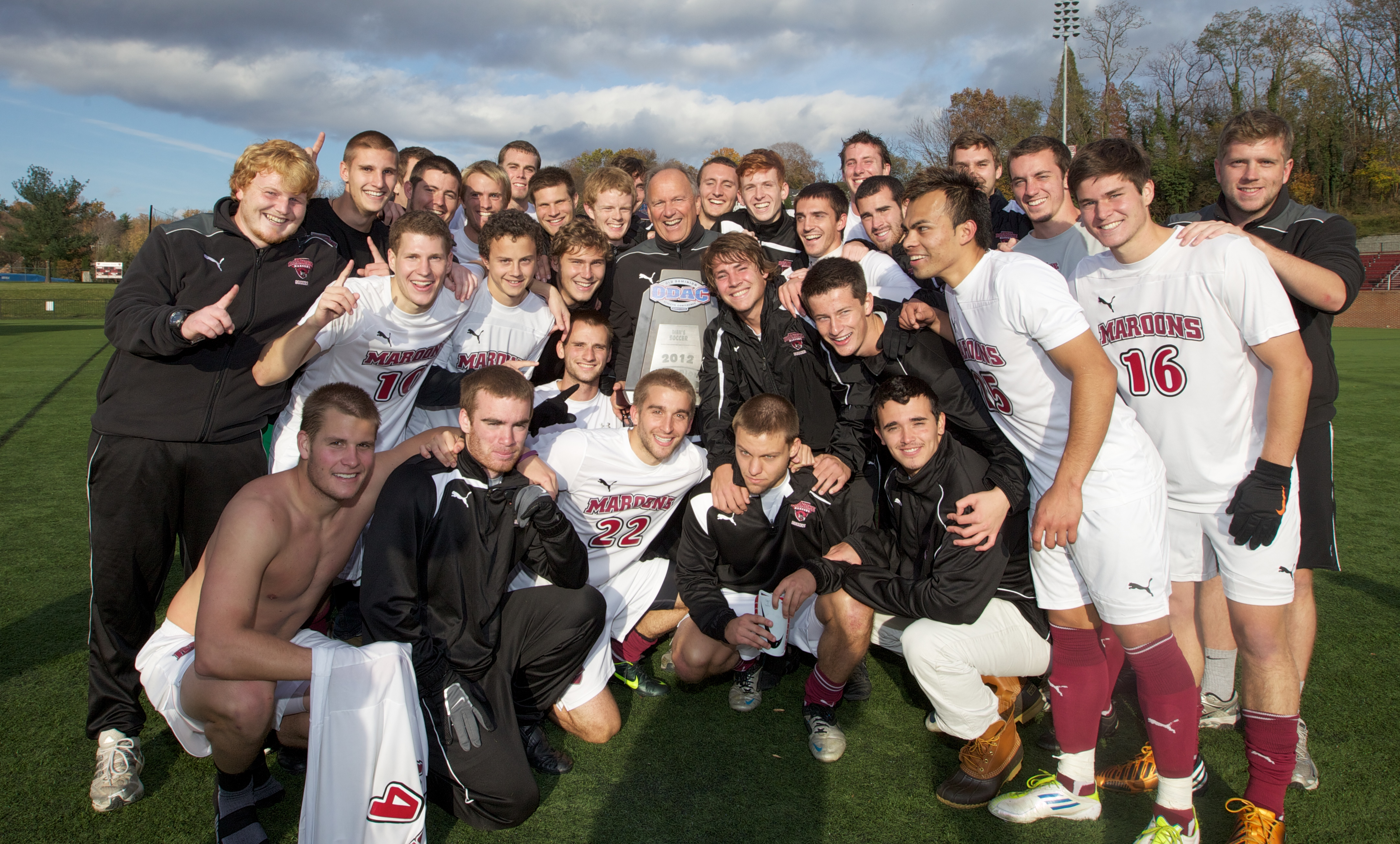
Roanoke men's soccer team, Conference champions in 2012

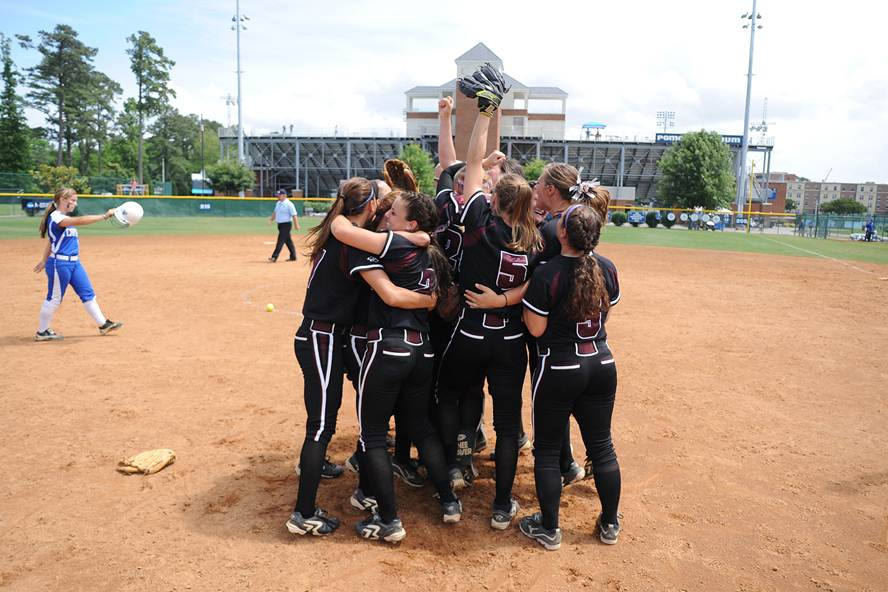
Roanoke softball players celebrating in 2012

Scott Allison retired as the head men's soccer coach in 2012 after 27 seasons at the helm of the program; in his final season, the Maroons won the ODAC championship and advanced to the opening round of the NCAA Division III tournament. Allison was named South Atlantic Regional Coach of the Year and Virginia College Division Coach of the Year; he continued to serve as Roanoke's director of athletics until his retirement in 2023.

Roanoke won a total of four ODAC championships during the 2012–13 academic year: men's soccer, women's indoor track and field, women's outdoor track and field, and men's lacrosse. The men's soccer team advanced to the NCAA Division III tournament; the team was defeated by Emory University. The men's lacrosse team advanced to the NCAA Division III tournament as well, defeating Centre College before losing to Lynchburg College. The softball team advanced to the NCAA Division III tournament as an at-large seed; the team was defeated by Christopher Newport University and Emory University.

Roanoke placed 111 student-athletes on the 2012–13 ODAC All-Academic team, the most in school history at the time. Roanoke currently owns the most ODAC titles in men's lacrosse with 18 titles and in women's basketball with 13 titles. Roanoke and Hampden-Sydney are tied for the most titles in men's basketball with 11 each.

== National Championships ==
Sport	NCAA Division	No. Titles	Year	Opponent	Score
Basketball (M)	Div. II	1	1972	Akron Zips	84–72
Lacrosse (M)	Div. II	1	1978	Hobart Statesmen	14–13

The school also boasts three individual national champions:

- 2001: Casey Smith won an individual national championship in the Division III women's 10,000m track and field event.
- 2009: Robin Yerkes secured an individual national championship when she won the Division III women's 400m track and field event. Yerkes is the most decorated athlete ever to graduate from Roanoke, earning 12 All-American honors in multiple events.
- 2025: Mark Samuel won the Division III Wrestling Championship.

== Conference championships ==
Sport	Titles	Winning years
Baseball	1	2017
Basketball (M)	11	1981, 1982, 1983, 1984, 1985, 1986, 1987, 1994, 1996, 2000, 2026
Basketball (W)	13	1983, 1984, 1986, 1987, 1989, 1991, 1992, 1993, 1994, 1995, 1997, 1998, 2000
Cross Country (M)	8	1980, 1981, 1983, 1985, 1986, 1987, 1998, 2003
Cross Country (W)	1	2002
Field Hockey	1	2002
Golf (M)	2	1980, 1981
Lacrosse (M)	18	1981, 1982, 1983, 1984, 1985, 1986, 1987, 1988, 1990, 1992, 1995, 1996, 1997, 2006, 2007, 2010, 2011, 2013
Lacrosse (W)	10	1987, 1988, 1990, 1991, 1994, 1995, 1996, 1997, 1999, 2009
Soccer (M)	9	1985, 1988, 1993, 1994, 2001, 2002, 2004, 2007, 2012
Soccer (W)	3	1987, 1990, 1998
Softball	8	1999, 2000, 2001, 2002, 2004, 2005, 2006, 2012
Swimming (M)	1	2021
Track & Field (W, Indoor)	9	1997, 1998, 2002, 2006, 2007, 2008, 2010, 2012, 2013
Track & Field (W, Outdoor)	11	1997, 2002, 2006, 2007, 2008, 2009, 2010, 2012, 2013, 2014, 2015
Wrestling (M)	4	2023, 2024, 2025, 2026

== NCAA tournament appearances ==
Includes appearances in the NCAA Division II and Division III tournaments

=== Baseball ===
2017
South Regional
Danville, Virginia

Division	Round	Opponents	Result
Division III	First Round	Salisbury	W 15-5
Division III	Quarterfinals	Emory	W 4-2
Division III	Semifinals	LaGrange	W 5-2
Division III	Finals-Game 1	Salisbury	L 6-7
Division III	Finals-Game 2	Salisbury	W 13-5

Division III World Series
Appleton, Wisconsin

Division	Round	Opponents	Result
Division III	First Round	Oswego State	W 8-7
Division III	Second Round	Washington & Jefferson	L 1-11
Division III	Elimination Finals	Concordia-Chicago	W 10-3
Division III	Semifinals	Washington & Jefferson	L 1-8

=== Men's basketball ===
1968
Mideast Regional
Ashland, Ohio

Division	Round	Opponent	Result
Division II	Regional Semifinal	Ashland	L 46-71
Division II	Regional 3rd Place Game	Denison	L 77-90

1971
South Atlantic Regional
Norfolk, Virginia

Division	Round	Opponent	Result
Division II	Regional Semifinal	Norfolk State	L 77-97
Division II	Regional 3rd Place Game	Stetson	L 72-91

1972
South Atlantic Regional
Salem, Virginia

Division	Round	Opponent	Result
Division II	Regional Semifinal	Mercer	W 78-72
Division II	Regional Championship	St. Thomas (FL)	W 67-57

Division II Men's Basketball Championship
Evansville, Indiana

Division	Round	Opponent	Result
Division II	Quarterfinals	Missouri-St. Louis	W 94-69
Division II	Semifinals	Eastern Michigan	W 99-73
Division II	Championship	Akron	W 84-72

1973
South Atlantic Regional
Salem, Virginia

Division	Round	Opponent	Result
Division II	Regional Semifinal	Loyola (MD)	W 84-63
Division II	Regional Championship	Old Dominion	W 88-87

Division II Men's Basketball Championship
Evansville, Indiana

Division	Round	Opponent	Result
Division II	Quarterfinals	Kentucky Wesleyan	L 63-87

1974
South Atlantic Regional
Norfolk, Virginia

Division	Round	Opponent	Result
Division II	Regional Semifinal	Norfolk State	L 75-84
Division II	Regional 3rd Place Game	Rollins	W 88-77

1979
South Atlantic Regional
Catonsville, Maryland

Division	Round	Opponent	Result
Division II	Regional Semifinal	Virginia Union	L 67-68
Division II	Regional 3rd Place Game	Mount St. Mary's	L 89-93

1981

Division	Round	Opponent	Result
Division III	First Round	Montclair State	L 55-57
Division III	Regional 3rd Place Game	Allegheny	W 84-75

1982

Division	Round	Opponent	Result
Division III	First Round	Montclair State	W 67-66
Division III	Regional Championship	Upsala	W 81-72
Division III	Quarterfinals	Brooklyn	L 59-62

1983

Division	Round	Opponent	Result
Division III	First Round	NC Wesleyan	W 66-63
Division III	Regional Championship	William Paterson	W 58-56
Division III	Quarterfinals	Clark (MA)	W 87-83
Division III	Semifinals	Scranton	L 67-82
Division III	3rd Place Game	UW Whitewater	W 83-77

1984

Division	Round	Opponent	Result
Division III	First Round	Washington (MD)	W 94-74
Division III	Regional Championship	Upsala	L 62-63

1985

Division	Round	Opponent	Result
Division III	First Round	William Paterson	L 68-71
Division III	Regional 3rd Place Game	Salisbury State	L 83-98

1986

Division	Round	Opponent	Result
Division III	First Round	Jersey City State	L 61-67
Division III	Regional 3rd Place Game	Trenton State	L 55-58

1987

Division	Round	Opponent	Result
Division III	First Round	Stockton State	L 64-67
Division III	Regional 3rd Place Game	Jersey City State	W 96-82

1994

Division	Round	Opponent	Result
Division III	Second Round	Hampden-Sydney	L 80-95

1996

Division	Round	Opponent	Result
Division III	First Round	Shenandoah	W 128-110
Division III	Second Round	Hendrix	W 80-64
Division III	Regional Semifinals	Illinois Wesleyan	L 88-116

2000

Division	Round	Opponent	Result
Division III	First Round	Marymount (VA)	W 83-72
Division III	Second Round	Rowan	L 74-80

2001

Division	Round	Opponent	Result
Division III	First Round	SCAD	W 70-62
Division III	Second Round	Christopher Newport	L 54-84

2025

Division	Round	Opponent	Result
Division III	First Round	Pfeiffer	W 71-70
Division III	Second Round	Christopher Newport	W 77-75
Division III	Third Round	Catholic	L 91-95 (OT)

2026

Division	Round	Opponent	Result
Division III	First Round	Rhodes	W 88-84
Division III	Second Round	Emory	L 81-83 (OT)

=== Women's basketball ===
1990

Division	Round	Opponent	Result
Division III	First Round	Maryville (TN)	L 62-64
Division III	Regional 3rd Place Game	Marymount (VA)	W 90-83

1991

Division	Round	Opponent	Result
Division III	First Round	Marymount (VA)	W 86-66
Division III	Regional Semifinal	Luther	W 84-74
Division III	Regional Championship	Washington St. Louis	L 51-67

1992

Division	Round	Opponent	Result
Division III	First Round	Maryville (TN)	W 73-71
Division III	Regional Semifinal	Alma	L 60-69

1993

Division	Round	Opponent	Result
Division III	First Round	Maryville (TN)	L 67-85

1994

Division	Round	Opponent	Result
Division III	First Round	NC Wesleyan	L 67-70

1995

Division	Round	Opponent	Result
Division III	First Round	Ferrum	W 87-70
Division III	Second Round	Maryville (TN)	L 59-90

1996

Division	Round	Opponent	Result
Division III	First Round	Maryville (TN)	L 76-77

1997

Division	Round	Opponent	Result
Division III	First Round	Thomas More	L 76-80

1998

Division	Round	Opponent	Result
Division III	First Round	Christopher Newport	L 57-77

2000

Division	Round	Opponent	Result
Division III	First Round	Shenandoah	W 69-55
Division III	Second Round	Hardin-Simmons	L 76-101

2010

Division	Round	Opponent	Result
Division III	First Round	McDaniel	W 77-66
Division III	Second Round	Christopher Newport	L 48-72

=== Men's cross country ===
Appearances: 1958, 1980, 1981, 1982, 1983, 1984, 1985, 1986, 1994, 1995, 1996, 1998, 2003, 2006, 2011, 2012, 2014

=== Women's cross country ===
Appearances: 1993, 1999, 2000, 2006, 2011

=== Field hockey ===
2002

Division	Round	Opponent	Result
Division III	Second Round	Mary Washington	L 0-2

=== Men's golf ===
Appearances: 1972, 1977, 1978, 1979 1980, 1981

=== Women's indoor track & field ===
Appearances: 2001, 2009, 2010, 2011, 2012, 2013, 2014

=== Men's lacrosse ===
1974

Division	Round	Opponent	Result
Division II	First Round	Hobart	L 6-15

1976

Division	Round	Opponent	Result
Division II	Quarterfinals	Washington (MD)	L 15-17

1977

Division	Round	Opponent	Result
Division II	Quarterfinals	Adelphi	W 14-12
Division II	Semifinals	Hobart	L 13-15

1978

Division	Round	Opponent	Result
Division II	Quarterfinals	Adelphi	W 13-8
Division II	Semifinals	UMBC	W 12-7
Division II	Championship	Hobart	W 14-13

1979

Division	Round	Opponent	Result
Division II	Quarterfinals	UMBC	L 8-13

1981

Division	Round	Opponent	Result
Division III	Quarterfinals	Washington (MD)	L 11-12

1982

Division	Round	Opponent	Result
Division III	Quarterfinals	Ithaca	W 14-11
Division III	Semifinals	Washington (MD)	L 11-19

1983

Division	Round	Opponent	Result
Division III	Quarterfinals	Ithaca	W 14-11
Division III	Semifinals	Washington (MD)	W 13-9
Division III	Championship	Hobart	L 9-13

1985

Division	Round	Opponent	Result
Division III	Quarterfinals	RIT	L 4-12

1986

Division	Round	Opponent	Result
Division III	Quarterfinals	Hobart	L 1-29

1987

Division	Round	Opponent	Result
Division III	Quarterfinals	Washington and Lee	L 11-19

1988

Division	Round	Opponent	Result
Division III	Quarterfinals	Washington (MD)	W 10-8
Division III	Semifinals	Hobart	L 6-19

1992

Division	Round	Opponent	Result
Division III	Quarterfinals	Gettysburg	W 16-15
Division III	Semifinals	Ithaca	W 20-10
Division III	Championship	Nazareth (NY)	L 11-22

1996

Division	Round	Opponent	Result
Division III	Quarterfinals	Salisbury	L 8-17

1997

Division	Round	Opponent	Result
Division III	Quarterfinals	Washington (MD)	L 9-14

1998

Division	Round	Opponent	Result
Division III	First Round	Washington (MD)	L 7-11

2005

Division	Round	Opponent	Result
Division III	Second Round	Widener	W 18-12
Division III	Quarterfinals	Lynchburg	W 10-9
Division III	Semifinals	Salisbury	L 10-13

2006

Division	Round	Opponent	Result
Division III	Second Round	Cabrini	W 17-6
Division III	Quarterfinals	Gettysburg	W 13-12
Division III	Semifinals	Salisbury	L 12-13 (OT)

2007

Division	Round	Opponent	Result
Division III	Second Round	Ohio Wesleyan	W 18-9
Division III	Quarterfinals	Salisbury	L 9-15

2009

Division	Round	Opponent	Result
Division III	Second Round	Denison	L 7-14

2010

Division	Round	Opponent	Result
Division III	First Round	Wittenberg	W 15-4
Division III	Second Round	Gettysburg	W 11-10 (OT)
Division III	Quarterfinals	Stevenson	L 14-15 (OT)

2011

Division	Round	Opponent	Result
Division III	First Round	Colorado College	W 25-5
Division III	Second Round	Gettysburg	W 15-9
Division III	Quarterfinals	Stevenson	W 13-12
Division III	Semifinals	Salisbury	L 7-16

2013

Division	Round	Opponent	Result
Division III	First Round	Centre	W 21-4
Division III	Second Round	Lynchburg	L 9-12

2015

Division	Round	Opponent	Result
Division III	First Round	Salisbury	L 3-6

2018

Division	Round	Opponent	Result
Division III	Second Round	Christopher Newport	L 11-17

2022

Division	Round	Opponent	Result
Division III	First Round	Gettysburg	L 8-14

2024

Division	Round	Opponent	Result
Division III	Second Round	Stevens	L 9-10

2026

Division	Round	Opponent	Result
Division III	First Round	Marymount (VA)	W 22-7
Division III	Second Round	Salisbury	L 3-19

=== Women's lacrosse ===
1988

Division	Round	Opponent	Result
Division III	Quarterfinals	Johns Hopkins	L 10-11

1990

Division	Round	Opponent	Result
Division III	Quarterfinals	Denison	W 11-5
Division III	Semifinals	St. Lawrence	L 7-14

1992

Division	Round	Opponent	Result
Division III	Quarterfinals	Frostburg State	W 15-11
Division III	Semifinals	Trenton State	L 3-17

1994

Division	Round	Opponent	Result
Division III	Quarterfinals	Trenton State	L 8-22

1996

Division	Round	Opponent	Result
Division III	Quarterfinals	Goucher	L 16-28

1997

Division	Round	Opponent	Result
Division III	Quarterfinals	Johns Hopkins	L 7-15

2007

Division	Round	Opponent	Result
Division III	First Round	Christopher Newport	W 14-6
Division III	Second Round	Franklin & Marshall	L 2-13

2009

Division	Round	Opponent	Result
Division III	First Round	Cabrini	W 14-9
Division III	Second Round	Gettysburg	L 6-15

2022

Division	Round	Opponent	Result
Division III	First Round	Bryn Athyn	W 23-4
Division III	Second Round	Gettysburg	L 8-9 (OT)

2023

Division	Round	Opponent	Result
Division III	First Round	Bryn Athyn	W 22-3
Division III	Second Round	Franklin & Marshall	L 14-16

2024

Division	Round	Opponent	Result
Division III	First Round	Hope	W 24-6
Division III	Second Round	Capital	W 20-11
Division III	Third Round	Franklin & Marshall	L 11-14

=== Women's outdoor track & field ===
Appearances: 1997, 2000, 2001, 2006, 2007, 2008, 2009, 2010, 2011, 2012, 2013, 2014, 2015

=== Men's soccer ===
1993

Division	Round	Opponent	Result
Division III	First Round	Methodist	W 1-0
Division III	Second Round	Virginia Wesleyan	W 3-0
Division III	Third Round	UC San Diego	L 1-2 (3OT)

2001

Division	Round	Opponent	Result
Division III	Second Round	Wilmington	W 1-0
Division III	Third Round	Greensboro	L 0-1

2002

Division	Round	Opponent	Result
Division III	Second Round	Greensboro	T 1-1 (2OT) (Falls on PK)

2004

Division	Round	Opponent	Result
Division III	First Round	Arcadia	L 0-1 (OT)

2007

Division	Round	Opponent	Result
Division III	First Round	Greensboro	L 1-2

2012

Division	Round	Opponent	Result
Division III	First Round	Emory	L 1-4

2019

Division	Round	Opponent	Result
Division III	First Round	Swarthmore	T 2-2 (2OT) (Falls on PK)

=== Women's soccer ===
1998

Division	Round	Opponent	Result
Division III	First Round	Lynchburg	L 0-1 (3OT)

2007

Division	Round	Opponent	Result
Division III	First Round	Methodist	W 3-1
Division III	Second Round	Lynchburg	L 0-1

2011

Division	Round	Opponent	Result
Division III	First Round	Centre	T 0-0 (2OT) ((Falls on PK)

=== Softball ===
1999
Regionals
Glassboro, New Jersey

Division	Round	Opponents	Result
Division III	First Round	Salisbury	L 3-5
Division III	Elimination Round	Montclair State	L 3-7 (8 inn.)

2000
Regionals
Salem, Virginia

Division	Round	Opponents	Result
Division III	First Round	Methodist	W 3-2
Division III	Championship-Game 1	Cabrini	W 3-2
Division III	Championship-Game 2	Cabrini	W 3-0 (9 inn.)

Division III World Series
Salem, Virginia

Division	Round	Opponents	Result
Division III	First Round	Alma	W 4-0
Division III	Quarterfinals	Chapman	L 0-5
Division III	Elimination Finals	UW Eau Claire	L 2-3 (15 inn.)

2001
Regionals
Salem, Virginia

Division	Round	Opponents	Result
Division III	First Round	Christopher Newport	W 1-0
Division III	Semifinals	Salisbury	W 5-3
Division III	Championship-Game 1	Salisbury	L 0-2
Division III	Championship-Game 2	Salisbury	W 7-3

Division III World Series
Salem, Virginia

Division	Round	Opponents	Result
Division III	First Round	North Central (IL)	W 8-0 (5 inn.)
Division III	Quarterfinals	Central (IA)	L 1-3
Division III	Elimination Finals	Wheaton (MA)	L 1-4

2002
Regionals
Atlanta, Georgia

Division	Round	Opponents	Result
Division III	First Round	Maryville (TN)	W 5-4
Division III	Semifinals	Emory	W 2-1
Division III	Championship-Game 1	Emory	L 1-2
Division III	Championship-Game 2	Emory	L 0-4

2004
Regionals
New Concord, Ohio

Division	Round	Opponents	Result
Division III	First Round	Emory	W 4-3
Division III	Semifinals	Muskingum	L 0-12 (5 inn.)
Division III	Elimination Finals	Emory	W 1-0
Division III	Championship-Game 1	Muskingum	L 1-5

2005
Regionals
Bethlehem, Pennsylvania

Division	Round	Opponents	Result
Division III	First Round	Moravian	W 2-1 (9 inn.)
Division III	Semifinals	Salisbury	L 1-6
Division III	Elimination Finals	Moravian	L 0-5

2006
Regionals
Salem, Virginia

Division	Round	Opponents	Result
Division III	First Round	Transylvania	W 5-1
Division III	Quarterfinals	Piedmont	W 3-2
Division III	Semifinals	Denison	W 2-1
Division III	Championship-Game 1	Emory	L 0-4
Division III	Championship-Game 2	Emory	L 1-2

2012
Regionals
Newport News, Virginia

Division	Round	Opponents	Result
Division III	First Round	Messiah	W 7-2
Division III	Semifinals	Emory	W 4-2
Division III	Championship-Game 1	Christopher Newport	W 4-1
Division III	Championship-Game 2	Christopher Newport	W 3-1

Division III World Series
Salem, Virginia

Division	Round	Opponents	Result
Division III	First Round	Tufts	W 1-0
Division III	Quarterfinals	Montclair State	L 0-2
Division III	Elimination Finals	Luther	W 2-0
Division III	Semifinals	Linfield	L 1-6

2013
Regionals
Salem, Virginia

Division	Round	Opponents	Result
Division III	First Round	Christopher Newport	L 0-8 (5 inn.)
Division III	Elimination Round	Penn St. Altoona	W 9-1 (6 inn.)
Division III	Elimination Finals	Emory	L 1-8

2022
Regionals
Cleveland, Ohio

Division	Round	Opponents	Result
Division III	First Round	Concordia (WI)	L 0-1
Division III	Elimination Round	TCNJ	L 2-4

2023
Regionals
Newport News, Virginia

Division	Round	Opponents	Result
Division III	First Round	Misericordia	W 3-0
Division III	Semifinals	Christopher Newport	L 0-2
Division III	Elimination Finals	Misericordia	W 6-1
Division III	Championship-Game 1	Christopher Newport	L 0-3

2024
Regionals
Bethlehem, Pennsylvania

Division	Round	Opponents	Result
Division III	First Round	Muskingum	L 3-6
Division III	Elimination Round	Penn College	W 8-0 (5 inn.)
Division III	Elimination Finals	Moravian	W 3-1
Division III	Championship-Game 1	Muskingum	W 3-1
Division III	Championship-Game 2	Muskingum	L 1-4
