= Radoslav Rochallyi =

Philosopher, contemporary painter, writer and poet (born 1980)

- Born: 1 May 1980; Bardejov, Czechoslovakia
- Education: London International Graduate School
- Known for: Golden Ratio Poetry; Equation Poetry; Vector Poetry; Science art Mathematical art
- Notable work: PUNCH
- Movement: In poetry: Concrete poetry Visual poetry Math poetry In the visual arts: Mathematical art
- Children: 4

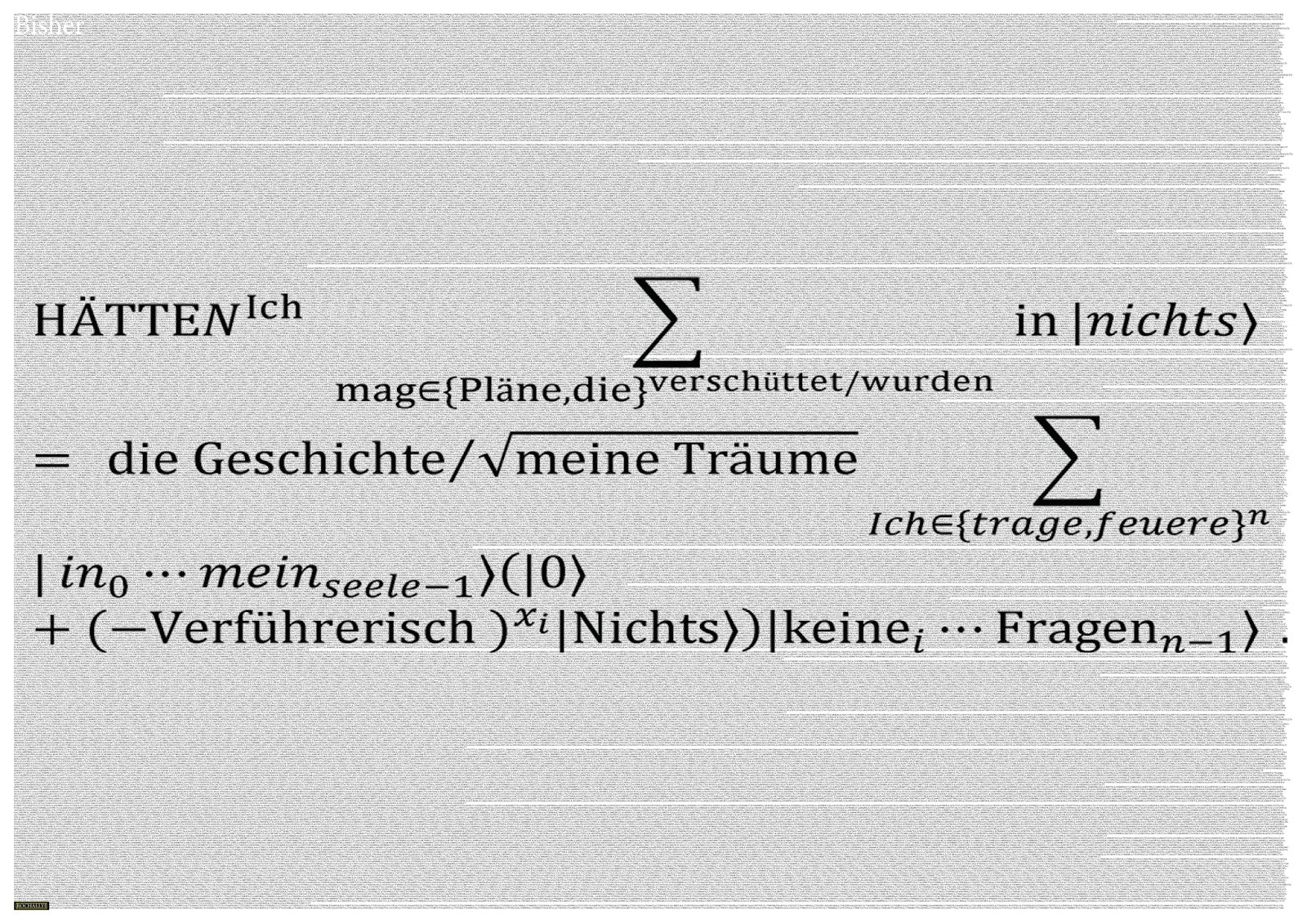
Sample of DNA Equation poetry, 2019, Poem title: Bisher

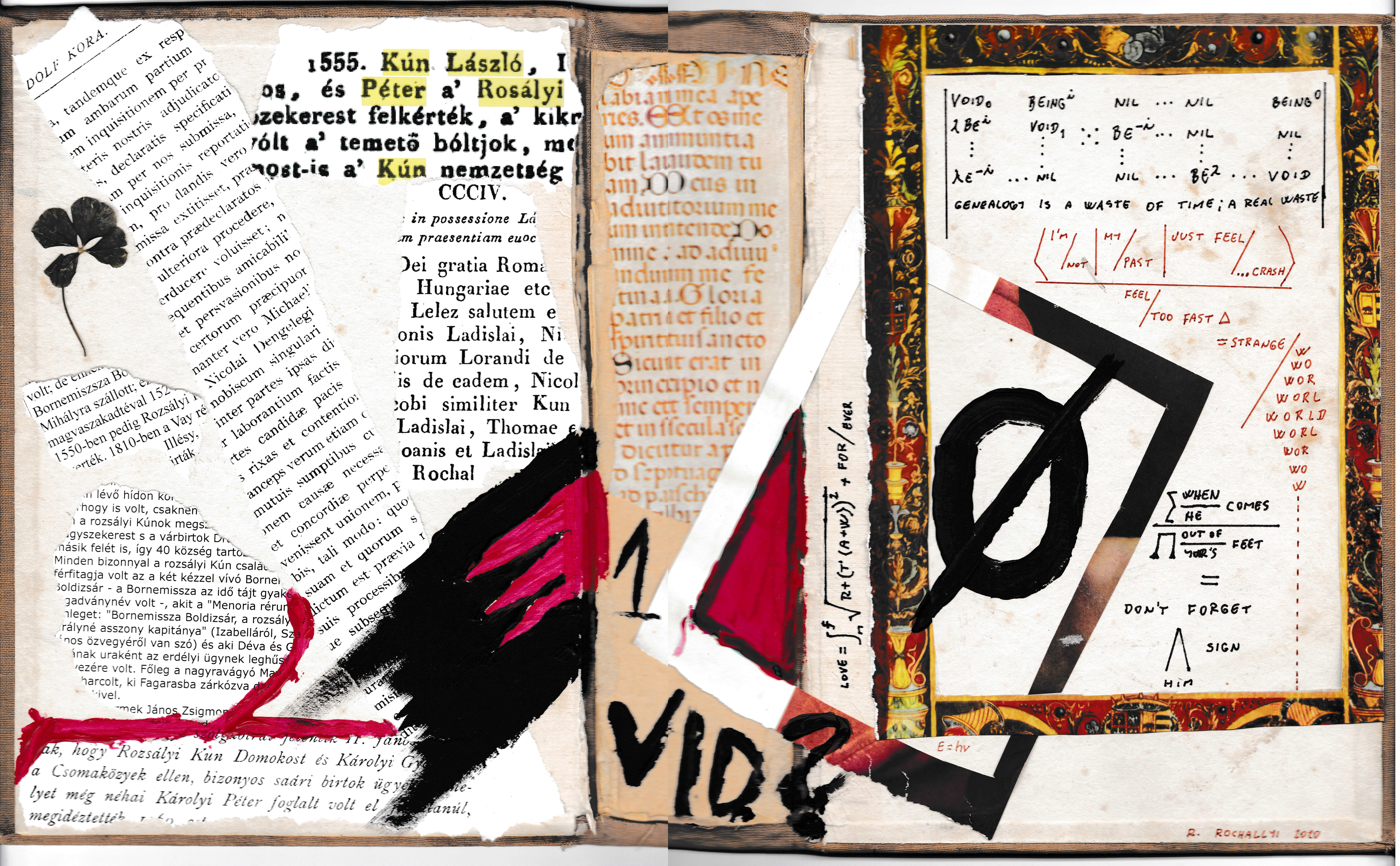
Visusal Art, 2020, title: GeneaWaste

Radoslav Rochallyi (also spelled Radoslav Rochally; born 1 May 1980) is a philosopher, contemporary painter, writer, and interdisciplinary artist living in Malta, and the Czech Republic.

== Early life and education ==
Rochallyi was born in Bardejov, Czechoslovakia in a family with Lemko and Hungarian roots. He start reading even before started primary school. The first book he read was the book Black Ships by Maciej Słomczyński. Around his eight years, he came across Lermontov's poems. Rochallyi started writing poetry as a ten-year-old, and he published own works in magazines from the age of sixteen. In an interview with Rowayat literary journal, he described his early cognitive orientation as being strongly system-focused. This orientation was characterized by his fascination with logic, patterns, and structured language. He experienced difficulties with conventional social interaction and verbal communication during childhood, finding typical social codes inaccessible. Consequently, he gravitated toward formal systems.

In 2001, he resided in Attleborough, England, where he wrote texts for his mathematical poetry. In 2009, Rochallyi went on a pilgrimage, following the Camino de Santiago (Way Camino Primitivo) to Santiago de Compostela.

He graduated in Management at the London International Graduate School and holds a certificate in Fine Arts, which he received at the Pratt Institute. He also studied philosophy, and mathematics (linear algebra). He is a member of Mensa.

== Works ==
Mathematical elements such as symmetry, geometry, equations, and numbers are common themes in his work. Using a wide range of media, Rochallyi creates visual patterns. He perceives his work as a combination of philosophy, poetry, painting, and mathematics.

Rochallyi is the author of fifteen books. In addition to Slovak and English , Rochallyi writes in Hungarian, Czech, and German. He debuted with the collection of poetry Panoptikum: Haikai no renga (2004), written in Japanese haiku.

According to Jan Balaz, the poetry of Radoslav Rochally is characterized by the use of a free verse, which gives the author the necessary freedom and directness to retain the specific nature of the testimony without embellishments. According to Lenka Vrebl, the perception of Radoslav Rochallyi is not playful, it is serious, direct and focused.

=== Mythra Invictus ===
The book was published in Slovak, English and German in 2019. The book Mythra Invictus has received a positive reception. According to Dominik Petruška, Mythra Invictus is a highly abstract work in terms of the ideas it presents, but at the same time it is very concrete through the feelings of the main character. The text evokes a strong aesthetic impression, which is ensured by the simple language in which complex philosophical questions are told. Rochallyi said in an interview that he was more influenced by the archetypal story of Gilgamesh in his writing than by Mithrianism itself. According to one of the reviews, Mythra Invictus focuses on the personal crisis of a male character named Caut. We could polemically connect the word Caut with the English word caution, but we find a more precise meaning in the Romance languages. Latin gives the meaning of caution, in Romanian the word caut means to look for. And from the overall concept of the work, it is clear that Caut is really looking for the meaning of his existence and the meaning of human existence in general. Rochallyi built the book in the form of a dialog, where Caut does not appear alone in the book, but is seconded by Mythra. The book has 24 chapters.

=== DNA: Canvases of Poetry/DNA: Leinwänden der Poesie ===
The book PUNCH was published in English and German in 2019. In the DNA-Canvases of Poetry collection he uses mathematical equations to express his poetry. In addition to his book, poetic equations have also been published in many anthologies and journals. For example, in anthologies and journals published at Stanford University, California State University, Utah Tech University, University of Olivet, or Las Positas College.

=== PUNCH ===
The book PUNCH was published only in English in 2020. In the Punch collection, author uses poems based on mathematics, especially on mathematical equations. Both the texts and the equations are based on the author's need to divide the text into a semantically and formally clear form. This work does not belong to concrete, pattern, graphic, code, FIB, or visual poetry. It is an alternative approach to creation. Poetic equations from the Punch collection was reviewed and published in journals.

By Andrea Schmidt Rochallyi be able to find a bearable relationship between the mathematical formalism and freedom. Schmidt argues that his poetry is a critique of semantics and language as such. Schmidt, in a review in the Rain Taxi, writes that PUNCH can be considered one of the most important works of experimental poetry in the last decade. Later, journal Dunes Review published his poem written in a geometric plotter.

=== ESSE ===
The book was published in English, and Slovak in 2020. It is a logical-ethical essay and a thought experiment on free will. It deals with the problem of free will and determinism, where the author argues that free will as we perceive it is an illusion and that moral decisions are not really moral. According to another source, it is a logical-philosophical analysis of morality and power, describing morality only as an adaptive characteristic of a social being.

=== # Mathaeata ===
The book was published in English in 2021. Steven J Fowler in an annotation to the book # Mathaeata wrote that Rochallyi builds poetry in mathematical terms, situating a droll humour laced with Nietzschean declaration within the context of brilliantly innovative visual design. Both magazines and journals have published mathematical poems from this collection.

=== Rovnicová poézia/ Equation Poetry ===
The book was published in Slovak in 2022, by Drewo a srd publishing house in Bratislava. In review of the book Rovnicová poézia, Eva Urbanova wrote that penetrating the secrets of this type of poetry really requires not only willingness, but also knowledge, even though the author himself gives partial instructions in the introduction to the book. And although the reviewer did not understand most of the complicated formulas, she found that logic is not always necessary: on the contrary, where logic decreases, adventure increases. In this way, some poems became humorous statement. Mathematical poems from this collection, which Rochallyi translated into English, also appeared in journals published in the United States. Peter Petro, a professor in the Department of Slavic Studies at the University of British Columbia in Vancouver, describes how Rochallyi demonstrate the ongoing vitality and innovation of Slovak poetry. His book Equation Poetry was mentioned in the Kandelaber podcast, which is dedicated to the evaluation of literature, as an exceptional poetry book in the year 2022.

== Writing style and philosophy ==
His work includes philosophy, visual arts, and poetry, and links each of these elements with mathematical symbols. Rochallyi uses mathematical language as an organizational principle and also uses mathematical symbols to describe intonation notation, or to define various types of specifications whose semantics are easier or more effective to express in non-verbal form. He has worked on aesthetic-logical minimalism as a system that brings aesthetics and logic together in content and uses mathematical and geometric patterns in form. In Magpiezine, he said he tries to answer the question of how complex meanings can be communicated through simple, aesthetically oriented forms of math and geometry. This approach is central to his artistic and aesthetic communication style.

In the field of philosophy, he was influenced by the work of physicist Max Tegmark and mathematician G. H. Hardy. In his artistic practice, he was shaped by the works of early experimental avant-garde artists (painters and poets). With Aesthetic Logical Minimalism, Rochallyi has worked on a system where he bases poetry on mathematics and logic. His work, in its literary practice, draws on ideas associated with Kurt Gödel, Alfred North Whitehead, Bertrand Russell, and Gottlob Frege. His work explores links between exact sciences and aesthetics, where equations and concepts from physics are used metaphorically.

In the French magazine Recours au poème n ° 212, Rochally's philosophy of creation was described as mathematical determinism.

=== The theme of freedom ===
In an interview in the literary magazine Tiny spoon, he said human decisions are determined by the mathematical nature of reality. Art and unconditional love are ways to resist determinism, at least for a while. In his 2025 essay "Deterministic Poetry," published in Denver Quarterly Vol. 60 No. 1 (p. 90–95), Rochallyi writes: "Perhaps more subversively, all that we characterize as freedom is a complicated result of a structure whose totality nobody is able to witness in full," adding that "Freedom lies not only in designing a system but also in knowing when to disrupt it. [...] Thus, the poet must be both architect and saboteur, writing the law and choosing its precise breach." This dual role of "architect and saboteur" is reflected in Rochallyi's systematic approach to creation. He treats poems and paintings as rigorous systems of thought, specifically through his development of "TORQ!" an axiomatic framework.

=== Golden Ratio Poetry ===
Rochallyi used an experimental poetic form of the golden ratio around 2012. It follows a strict structure based on the golden number 1.618033 in syllables. Typically represented in the form of six lines, 1/6/1/8 / (0) / 3/3 - with so many words or syllables on the line that correspond to the golden number. The only limitation of poetry according to the golden number is the number of words or syllables followed by the sequence number 1.618033. The Greek letter Phi represents the golden ratio. Its value is 1.618034. In Golden Divine collection (2015), he tried to link poetry with Fi (φ) and hence the number 1,618034 in non-graphical form and with a golden section in its graphic form. Schmidt argues that his Golden Divine is a prototype of formal fundamentalism in poetry, employing a restriction according to the Greek letter phi. The only limitation of "Golden Ratio Poetry" is that the number of words or syllables follows the sequence of digits in 1.618034. Sarah Glaz of the Department of Mathematics, University of Connecticut wrote that although the decimal expansion of any irrational number is infinite, the counting pattern in the poem uses only an approximation of the number itself, so R. Rochallyi used a modified decimal expansion of ɸ as the number of words or syllables per line of his poems. Specifically, he stopped at the 6th decimal place and rounded the last number from 3 to 4.

=== Equation Poetry ===
Equation Poetry uses mathematical language as an organizational principle and at the same time uses mathematical symbols to describe intonation notation (for example, nervous³), or to define various types of specifications that are simpler or more efficient to express in non-text form. In Acta Victoriana Rochallyi claims that every formal rule in poetry is a mathematical rule. This restriction defines the form of poetry. Hence, it can be said that (almost) no form of poetry can do without mathematics. In the Author's Note in Roanoke Review he mentioned that they both have symbolism, algorithmic basis, structures, formulas, and symmetry. Combining the two is completely natural, as is reading and studying their patterns.

Rochallyi claim that the ambition of Equation Poetry should not be to preserve the meaning of the equation, but to preserve the form, formula and symmetry as accurately as possible. Preserving its full meaning would define the content of poetry and not just form. In such a case, we would not even be making poetry because the resulting poem would be a cluster of precisely positioned words, but without the general meaning. And we wouldn't be creating anything mathematical either; the resulting equation would simply not make sense.

According to Rochallyi's article in The Minnesota Review, Equation Poetry is characterized by a greater freedom of writing, or at least the possibility of choosing the equations used, which in itself defines the freedom of its creation. And this is a freedom much greater than that provided by most of the strict structural forms.

=== Vector Poetry ===
For Rochallyi, 2022 and 2023 are the years of answering whether vector poetry can provide an extended visual interpretation of the language unavailable through traditional notation and interpretation. The combination of time, space, movement, and direction can expand all aspects of a text and its meaning. His endeavor aims to investigate the semantics/semiotics of vectors in poetry as a response to the problem of creating meaningful patterns. Rochallyi believe that Vectors can be used to create a sense of movement in a poem. For example, words can flow smoothly from one to another, creating a sense of rhythm and movement. It can add another layer of meaning to the poem and make it more interesting to explore. Vector Poetry replaces words or partial phrases with vectors. In vector poetry, words are arranged in a specific way to visually represent the poem's meaning. Just as a vector is defined by its direction and length, each word or sentence is represented by a line that points in a particular direction and has a certain length. Vector poetry is a form of mathematical expressionism in art. It can capture words, emotions, movement, and location. In an essay entitled Classification of Mathematical Poetry in Hyperrhiz Journal, Rochallyi described vector poetry as a method of creating poetry and vectorizing poetry through vector space-VSP. His vector poetry captures states, space, and time to showcase a concise but poetic expression. It achieves an emotional effect by moving a word or phrase across a grid of vector space, creating a visual and especially emotional effect, or by using mathematical equations to create shapes and movements.

== Visual and fine arts ==
Rochallyi's visual work includes collage and painting. All his paintings and collages contain equations or mathematical elements. Primarily operators, equations and vectors. His collages and paintings have also been published in magazines. In 2020, he was included in a selection of artists in the catalog 101 Contemporary Artists and more. In 2023, he was finalist in the Nanjing International Biennal, organised by Nanjing University of the Arts. In 2024, he was selected for an art residency in Slovakia, where he attempted to translate poetic equations into paintings, trying to figure out how to adapt the horizontal rigor of the equations to different forms.

His paintings have been exhibited, for example:

- Bridges 2026 Exhibition of Mathematical Art, Craft, and Design, The Bridges Organization, University of Galway, Ireland
- 2 IBMB International Biennial Of Miniature Art-Graphics And Drawings. Officers' Hall. Bitola. North Macedonia. August 12—31, 2025.
- Post Factual 2024- Solo exhibition, Galerie Lichtenštejnský dům, Breclav, Czech Republic
- Beep Painting Biennial 2024, elysium gallery, Swansea, Wales, UK
- Po-Mosty Wielokulturowości, Częstochowa and Lviv, Poland and Ukraine
- Número Seis. Punto, The Wrong Biennale, Alicante, Spain
- Szépművészeti Múzeum, Budapest, Hungary
- #social 2022, CICA Museum, Soul, South Korea
- Progress. On Contemporary and Future Society, GALLERY Loosenart, Rome, Italy
- Collecting & Reassembling, Richmond Art Gallery, Richmond, BC, Canada
- III Convocatoria", MIDECIANT, Innovation Centre in Art and New Technologies, The International Museum of Electrography, University of Castilla-La Mancha, Cuenca, Spain
- /’Fu:bar/ Glitch art Exhibition, Institut Français En Croatie in Zagreb, Croatia
- Electronics, new media, robotics in art context, Pandora Kunstgalerie, Berlin, Germany
- Magic + Miracles, Kreiva Gallery, Bridlington, United Kingdom
- Queer Ecologies, Galerie FaVU, Brno, Czech Republic

He was the curator of Space Byi, an independent curatorial platform dedicated to experimental art and focusing on mathematical and conceptual approaches. He launched an international project as part of The Wrong Biennale, inviting artists to submit works exploring geometry, number theory, and algorithmic aesthetics in the form of art, academic papers, and poetry. Emphasising non-commercial physical participation, the project serves as a cross-disciplinary intersection of mathematics and visual language.

== Awards and honours ==
=== Literature ===
In 2018, he won second and third place in the 2018 SSS Reader's Prize literary competition for the poetry collection Panoptikum and the prose book Letter for a Son. In 2023 he won the second place in the Percy Bysshe Shelley Remembered Poetry Contest organized by The GroundUp from NY, USA. He has been a multiple Pushcart nominee. In 2024, he was nominated for Best of the Net 2025 by The Broadkill Review.

=== Art ===
In 2023, he was finalist in the Nanjing International Biennal, organised by Nanjing University of the Arts. In 2024, he was selected for an art residency in Slovakia In 2024, he has been included in the Beep Painting Biennial 2024 at the Elysium Gallery.

== Bibliography ==
=== Poetry ===
- 2004 – Panoptikum: Haikai no renga. [in Slovak]. ISBN 978-1981294893.
- 2014 – Yehidah. [in Slovak] 2014. 67 p. ISBN 978-1523354542.
- 2015 – Golden Divine. [in Slovak] Brno: Tribun EU, 34 p. ISBN 978-80-263-0877-5.
- 2015 – Blood. [in Slovak]2015. 43 p. ISBN 978-80-972031-7-7.
- 2016 – Torwalden. [in Slovak] 2016. ISBN 978-1534848702.
- 2018 – Mechanics of everyday life. [in Slovak] 2018. ISBN 978-80-8202-030-7.
- 2018 – Arété.[in Slovak] 2018. ISBN 978-80-8202-041-3
- 2019 – DNA: Leinwänden der Poesie [in German] ISBN 978-8097350116
- 2019 – DNA: Canvases of Poetry [in English] ISBN 978-8097350123
- 2020 – PUNCH [in English] ISBN 978-8097373702
- 2021 – # mathaeata [in English], ISBN 9788097373719
- 2022 – Rovnicová poézia/ Equation Poetry. [in Slovak] Bratislava: Drewo a srd, 96 p.ISBN 978-80-89550-80-7
- 2023 – A vague report of a strange time: a non-mathematically poetic [in English] Tulsa: Yorkshire Publishing ISBN 978-1960810311
- 2023 – oo [in English] Nat 1 Publishing LLC, Audience Askew, Auburn ASIN B0CNV7Y1GC
- 2026 – Algoritmus chyby. [in Czech] Prague: dybbuk, Opium poezie (47), 128 p. ISBN 978-80-7690-193-3

=== Prose ===
- 2017 – A Letter for a son.Brno: Tribun EU, 2017. 98 p. [in English] ISBN 978-80-263-1195-9.
- 2019 – Mythra Invictus. The destiny of man. Bratislava: VSSS, 2019. 108 p. [in English] [in German] ISBN 9788082020857.
- 2020 – ESSE. Theorems on morality and power. Bratislava: EOCN. 168p. [in English] ISBN 978-80-9735-013-0.

=== Essays ===
- 2023 - Classification of Mathematical Poetry, Hyperrhiz Journal
- 2025 - Deterministic Poetry: On freedom within mathematical structures, Denver Quarterly

== See also ==
- Visual poetry
- Mathematics and art
- Conceptual art
- Concrete poetry
