= Acta Victoriana =

Literary magazine of Victoria University, Toronto

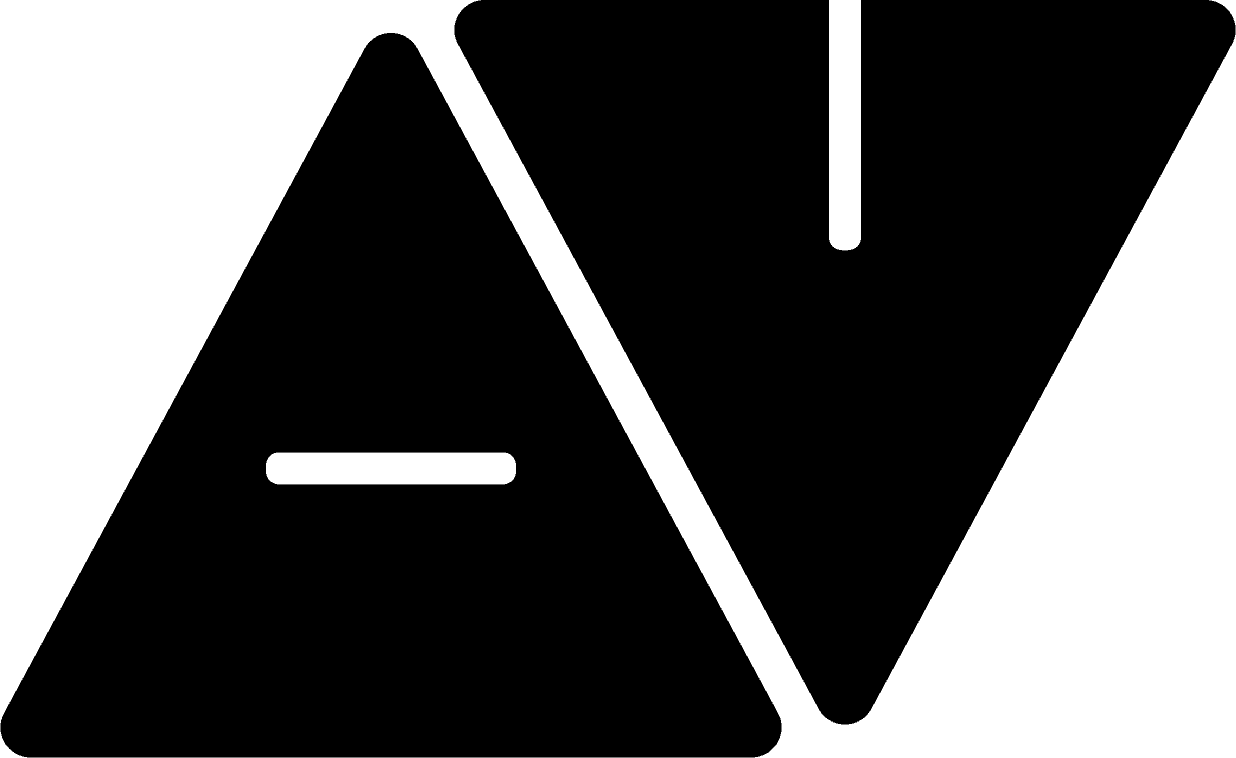
- Editors: Audrey Mahoney, Eunsae Lee
- Categories: Canadian literary journal
- Frequency: Biannually
- Publisher: Victoria University
- Founded: 1878
- Country: Canada
- Based in: Toronto
- Language: English
- ISSN: 0700-8406

Acta Victoriana is the biannual literary journal of Victoria University in the University of Toronto. It was founded in May 1878 and is the oldest continuous university publication in Canada; its 146th volume was published in 2022. Acta Victoriana publishes at Coach House Press.

== History ==
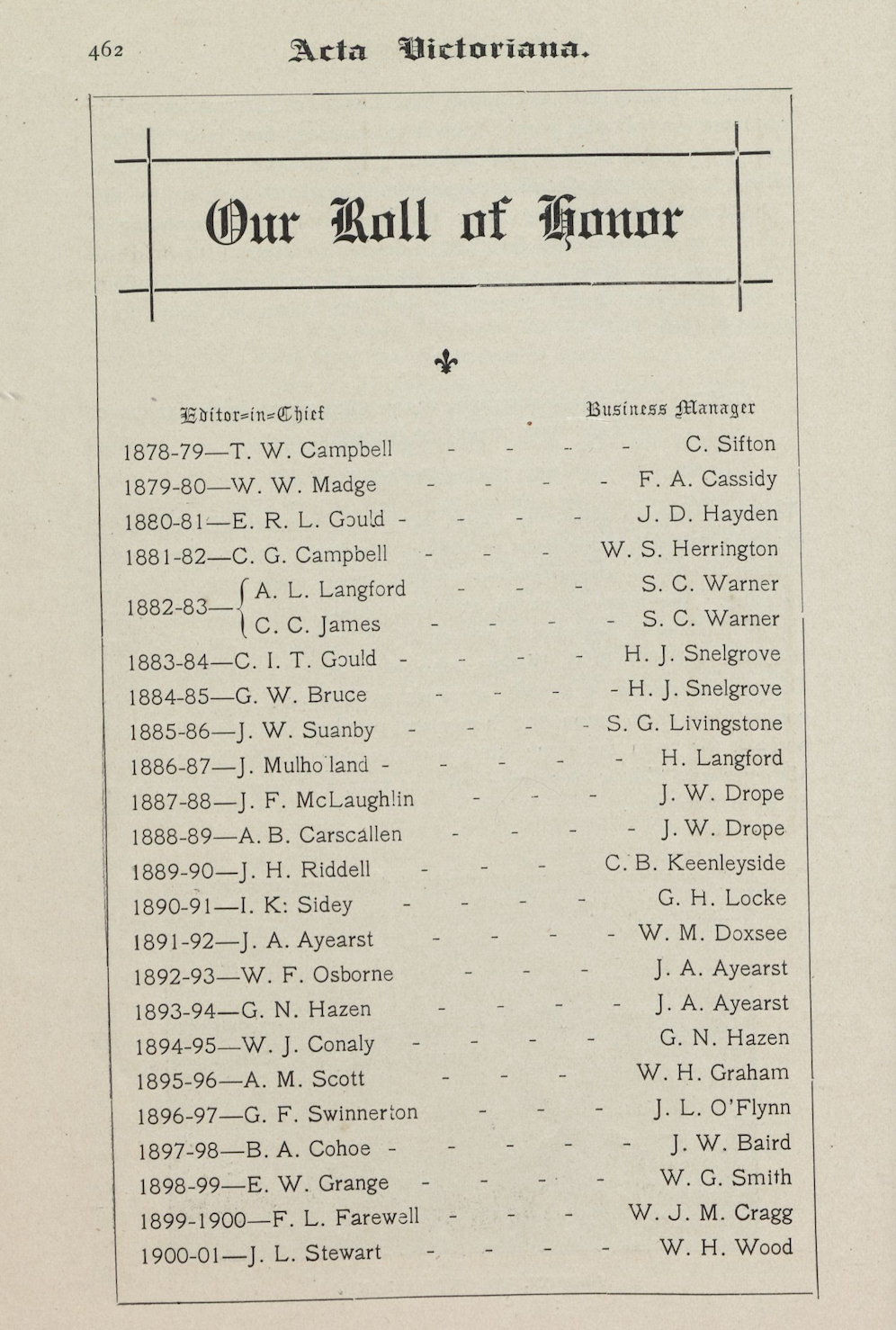
List of Editors and Business Managers from 1878 to 1901. Printed in Acta Victoriana Vol. XXV, No. 8 (June, 1902)

Acta Victoriana was founded in 1877 at Victoria College in Cobourg, Ontario to publish "short literary articles by College men; local items of interest to the Students and their friends; general College and Educational news; and Editorials upon Educational questions—especially upon questions of interest to the Alumni and friends of Victoria University".

Though originally a 'review' of Victoria University life with a few pages reserved for creative work, over the years it has shifted its focus to become a publication of short fiction and poetry. This transition was largely the result of the creation of the Victoria College student newspaper The Strand in 1953 and the student yearbook The Victoriad in 1978.

== Selected past contributors and editors ==
The following is a list of the selected former contributors and editors of Acta Victoriana.

- Margaret Atwood
- Margaret Avison
- John Bemrose
- Wilfred Campbell
- George Elliott Clarke
- Northrop Frye
- David Gilmour
- Sandy Johnson
- Jim Johnstone
- Archibald Lampman
- Irving Layton
- Dennis Lee
- Robert McConnell
- Bruce Meyer
- A. F. Moritz
- Lester B. Pearson
- Sara Peters
- E. J. Pratt
- Al Purdy
- Charles G. D. Roberts
- Radoslav Rochallyi
- Duncan Campbell Scott
- Clifford Sifton
- Goldwin Smith
- Souvankham Thammavongsa
- Ian Williams
