= Roanoke Review =

American literary journal

- Discipline: Literary journal
- Language: English
- Edited by: Mary Crockett Hill

Publication details
- History: 1967 to 2014 in print 2015 to present online
- Publisher: Roanoke College (United States)
- Frequency: Semi-monthly

Standard abbreviations
- ISO 4: Roanoke Rev.

Indexing
- ISSN: 0035-7367

Links
- Journal homepage

Roanoke Review is an American literary journal based at Roanoke College in Salem, Virginia. It was founded in 1967 by Henry Taylor and Edward A. Tedeschi. Among the journal's original contributors were Malcolm Cowley, Lee Smith, and R.H.W. Dillard. Robert Walter edited the Review until 2001. Paul Hanstedt took over the Review after Dr. Walter's retirement, and has edited it since. Starting in 2015, the Review became a digital-only journal, featuring stories, poems, nonfiction essays, interviews, art, and podcasts.

Among the recent contributors are Ernest Kroll, June Spence, Vaishnavi Pusapati, Charles Wright, Radoslav Rochallyi and Jacob M. Appel.

== See also ==
- List of literary magazines
