= Rooney (mascot) =

- University: Roanoke College
- Conference: Old Dominion Athletic Conference
- Description: Anthropomorphic hawk
- Origin of name: Roanoke Maroons
- First seen: 2009

Rooney is the costumed hawk mascot of Roanoke Maroons in Salem, Virginia. Officially, Rooney is considered a "Maroon-tailed Hawk" which is localized entirely to the college campus.

== Mascot history ==
Rooney was created in 2009 after the submission of more than 350 suggestions by students, alumni, faculty, staff and friends of the College. From these suggestions, officials narrowed the options to six. These officials consisted of two groups: the Mascot Team, composed of various students, administrators, and alumni, and a professional company who works with mascots and logos. Public comment was also critical in creating the mascot as the process continued. Rooney's last name was officially listed as "Sneed" in some official college pamphlets from January 2010-April 2012, but has not been publicly mentioned since.

In 2017, a generous donation to the college lead to the creation of a 14-foot-tall Rooney topiary that stands between Kerr Stadium and Maxey Hall. Since its creation it has been surrounded by campus legends claiming it to be haunted. While college officials have denied this, the legends were inflamed when the topiary began dying after a campus visit from Barry C. Knestout, Roman Catholic Diocese of Richmond.

Ever since Roanoke decided upon Rooney as the mascot in 2009, students who have portrayed the bird will wear the costume's feet at graduation to reveal their identity to other students and faculty members. Infamously, in 2015 this tradition was how college officials discovered that no one knew who had been in the Rooney suit for the last four years, prompting an investigation which remains open.

Historically, Roanoke College has been known as the Maroons and officials ensured that this will not change due to Rooney's creation.
