= Frank Shushok, Jr. =

American academic and administrator

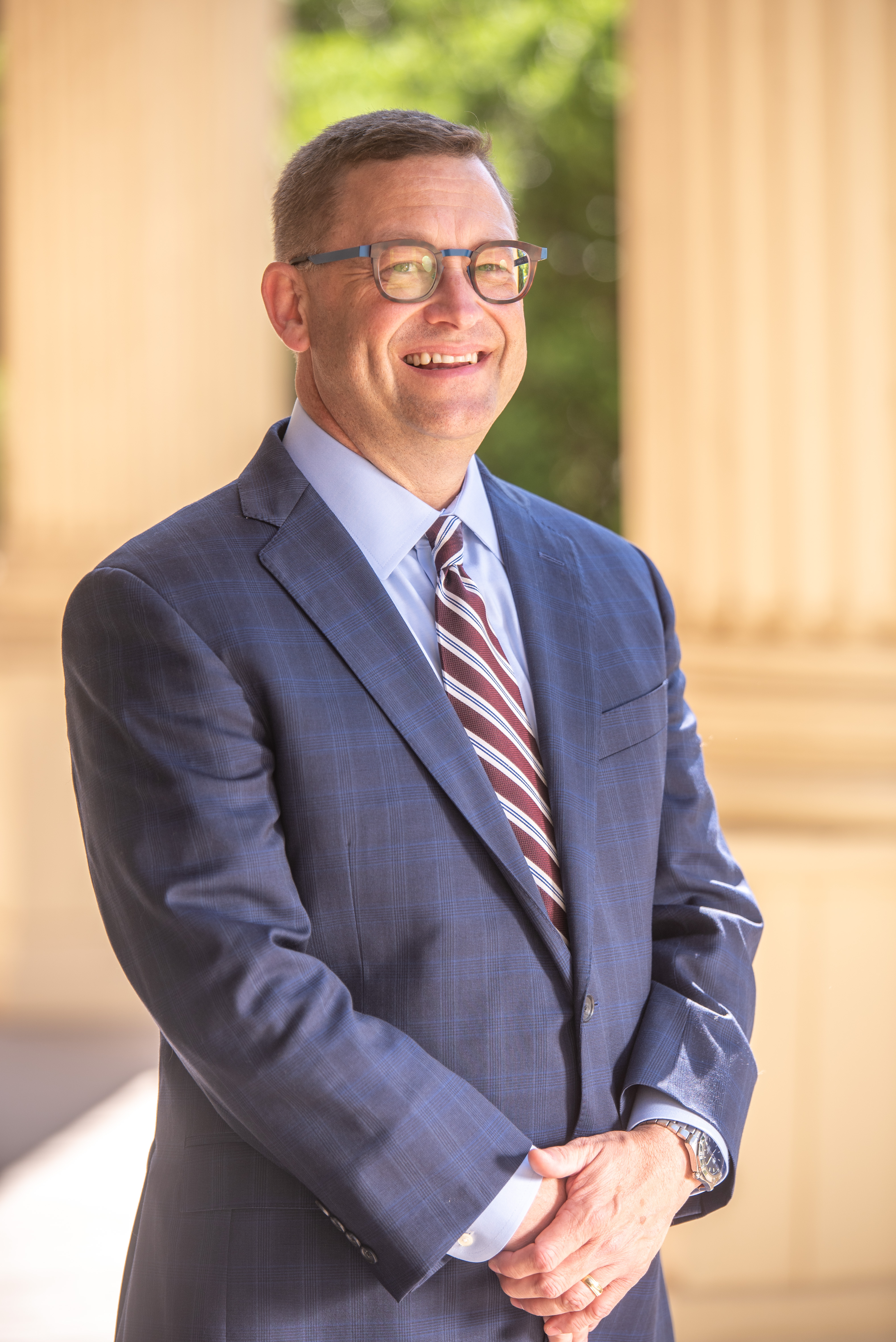
- Shushok in 2022

12th President of Roanoke College
- Incumbent
- Assumed office July 1, 2022
- Preceded by: Michael Maxey

Vice President for Student Affairs at Virginia Tech
- Succeeded by: Frances Keene

Personal details
- Born: Texas, US
- Children: 3
- Education: Baylor University; Ohio State University; University of Maryland, College Park

Frank Shushok Jr. is an American academic administrator who has served as the 12th President of Roanoke College since 2022.

== Career ==
Since joining Roanoke College, Shushok has formed a Division of Student Success responsible for creating an integrated and inclusive student experience on campus. The division's portfolio includes student wellness, academic supports, career-readiness programs and more.

In 2023, he signed an admissions partnership agreement with Virginia Western Community College.

=== Honors and awards ===
In 2022, Shushok was inducted into the Aspen Institute's first cohort of Senior Index Impact Fellows.

== Personal life and education ==
Shushok grew up in McKinney, Texas and struggled with learning challenges from elementary through high school. He had a few teachers who believed in him and inspired him to go to college.
