= Brian Morehouse =

American college basketball coach (born 1968)

Current position
- Title: Head coach
- Team: Hope
- Conference: MIAA
- Record: 758–107 (.876)

Biographical details
- Born: July 2, 1968 (age 58)
- Education: Hope College (B.A., 1991); Western Michigan University (Master's)

Coaching career (HC unless noted)

Men's Basketball
- ?–?: Hope (student asst.)
- ?–?: Hope (JV HC)

Women's Basketball
- 1996–present: Hope

Head coaching record
- Overall: 758–107

Accomplishments and honors

Championships
- 2 NCAA Division III Tournament (2006, 2022); 2 NCAA Division III Runner–up (2008, 2010); 2 D3Sports.com National Championships (2020, 2021) (Note: Tournament abandoned midway in 2020; no tournament held in 2021, recognised D3Sports.com poll champion.); 20 MIAA (2000–2003, 2005–2006, 2008–2011, 2013–2014, 2016–2018, 2020–2024); 18 MIAA Tournament (1998, 2001–2003, 2006–2010, 2013–2014, 2016, 2018, 2020–2023, 2026)

Records
- Fastest Coach to 700 wins

Brian Dean Morehouse (born July 2, 1968) is an American college basketball coach currently serving as the head coach of the Hope Flying Dutch women's basketball team.

== Career ==
On January 25, 2020, Morehouse became the fastest college basketball coach (men's or women's) to reach 600 wins, reaching the mark in his 690th game. His record would later get broken by G.P. Gromacki, Amherst College's women's basketball head coach, on February 2, 2024.

== Head coaching record ==
Record table
Season	Team	Overall	Conference	Standing	Postseason
Hope Flying Dutch (Michigan Intercollegiate Athletic Association) (1996–present)
1996–97	Hope	15–12	7–5	4th	
1997–98	Hope	16–11	8–4	2nd	NCAA first round
1998–99	Hope	20–7	9–7	3rd	NCAA first round
1999–2000	Hope	21–5	14–2	1st	
2000–01	Hope	25–3	14–0	1st	NCAA second round
2001–02	Hope	27–3	12–2	1st	NCAA Sweet Sixteen
2002–03	Hope	31–1	14–0	1st	NCAA Elite Eight
2003–04	Hope	23–4	12–2	2nd	
2004–05	Hope	23–4	14–2	T–1st	
2005–06	Hope	33–1	16–0	1st	NCAA Champions
2006–07	Hope	24–4	13–3	2nd	NCAA second round
2007–08	Hope	30–1	16–0	1st	NCAA Runner–up
2008–09	Hope	28–2	15–1	1st	NCAA Elite Eight
2009–10	Hope	32–2	16–0	1st	NCAA Runner–up
2010–11	Hope	27–3	15–1	T–1st	NCAA second round
2011–12	Hope	22–5	13–3	2nd	
2012–13	Hope	29–2	15–1	T–1st	NCAA Elite Eight
2013–14	Hope	28–1	16–0	1st	NCAA second round
2014–15	Hope	25–5	14–2	2nd	NCAA Sweet Sixteen
2015–16	Hope	26–2	15–1	1st	NCAA first round
2016–17	Hope	24–5	14–2	2nd	NCAA Sweet Sixteen
2017–18	Hope	29–2	15–1	T–1st	NCAA Elite Eight
2018–19	Hope	24–5	14–2	2nd	NCAA second round
2019–20	Hope	29–0	16–0	1st	NCAA Sweet Sixteen; Tournament abandoned; Finished No. 1 in D3Sports.com poll.
2020–21	Hope	16–0	7–0	1st	D3Sports.com National Champions
2021–22	Hope	32–1	15–1	T–1st	NCAA Champions
2022–23	Hope	26–3	14–2	T–1st	NCAA second round
2023–24	Hope	26–4	15–1	1st	NCAA sweet sixteen
2024–25	Hope	21–5	14–2	2nd	
2025–26	Hope	26–4	14–2	2nd	NCAA sweet sixteen
Hope:		758–107 (.876)	381–45 (.894)		
Total:		758–107 (.876)			
National champion Postseason invitational champion Conference regular season champion Conference regular season and conference tournament champion Division regular season champion Division regular season and conference tournament champion Conference tournament champion

1. 2019-20, tournament was abandoned after two rounds because of pandemic. Was No. 1 in final poll.
2. No NCAA postseason held due a low number of schools playing the season. Was No. 1 all eight weeks, including the final, poll of D3Sports.com.

== See also ==
- List of college women's basketball career coaching wins leaders
