= Bob Amsberry (basketball) =

American Basketball Coach

Current position
- Title: Head coach
- Team: Wartburg
- Conference: American Rivers
- Record: 407–142 (.741)

Biographical details
- Education: Buena Vista University; Western Illinois University

Coaching career (HC unless noted)
- 1992–1997: MacMurray (assistant)
- 1997–2006: Rockford
- 2006–present: Wartburg

Head coaching record
- Overall: 538–249 (.684)
- Tournaments: NCAA 19-13; IIAC/A-R-C 21-13

Accomplishments and honors

Championships
- 3x NCAA Regional - Final Four (2016, 2018, 2024); 3x NIIC Regular Season (2004, 2005, 2006); 4x NIIC Tournament (2001, 2003, 2005, 2006); 8x IIAC/A-R-C Regular Season (2017, 2018, 2019, 2020, 2023, 2024, 2025, 2026); 6x IIAC/A-R-C Tournament (2017, 2018, 2019, 2020, 2024, 2025)

Awards
- 2018 DIII National Coach of the Year; 2x Regional Coach of the Year (2016, 2024); 4x Northern Illinois-Iowa Conference Coach of the Year (2000, 2004, 2005, 2006); 5x IIAC/A-R-C Coach of Year (2017, 2018, 2020, 2023, 2024); Rockford University Athletic Hall of Fame

Robert "Bob" Amsberry is an American college basketball coach. He is the current head women's basketball coach at Wartburg College in Waverly, Iowa.

== Coaching career ==
=== Rockford College ===
Amsberry became the head coach of Rockford College in 1997 and inherited a losing streak that reached 70 games. In just three seasons he went from 0–25 to 18–8, orchestrating one of the best turnarounds in NCAA history. They would go on to win three consecutive conference titles from 2004 to 2006. Amsberry left Rockford as the winningest coach in the colleges history with 131 wins, a record he still holds today. In the fall of 2025, Amsberry was inducted to the Rockford University athletics hall of fame.

=== Wartburg College ===
Amsberry has led the Knights eight consecutive NCAA tournaments, including three final four appearances in 2016, 2018, and 2024. His 2017–18 season was the first undefeated regular season in program history. The Knights reached their highest ranking in school history when they reached No. 2 in both the WBCA and D3hoops.com polls. The Knights started the season with a school-record 31 consecutive victories before eventually falling in the Final Four to Bowdoin College and finishing the season 31–1. Amsberry received the 2018 DIII WBCA National Coach of the Year Award for their school record performance in 2017–2018. He was also a finalist for the award in both 2016 and 2019. In addition, he has been awarded the Iowa Basketball Coaches’ Association Paul Maske Memorial Coach of the Year award four times. On November 11, 2023, following a 71-57 win against Luther, Amsberry surpassed Monica Severson as the winningest coach in Wartburg history with 336 wins. The 2023-24 season Amsberry brought his team to their third NCAA DIII Final Four appearance after defeating Washington and lee in the Elite Eight. Amsberry was also named the 2024 Region 9 Coach of the Year.

== Head coaching record ==
Record table
Season	Team	Overall	Conference	Standing	Postseason
Rockford Regents (Northern Illinois-Iowa Conference) (1997–2006)
1997–98	Rockford	0–25	0-10	6th	
1998–99	Rockford	6–19	2-8	5th	
1999–00	Rockford	18–8	8-2	2nd	
2000–01	Rockford	17-9	8-4	2nd	NCAA First Round
2001–02	Rockford	14-11	6-6	4th	
2002-03	Rockford	17-12	8-4	2nd	NCAA First Round
2003–04	Rockford	16-10	10-2	1st	
2004-05	Rockford	22-6	10-2	1st	NCAA First Round
2005-06	Rockford	21-7	9-3	1st	NCAA First Round
Rockford:		131–107 (.550)	61-41 (.598)		
Wartburg Knights (Iowa Intercollegiate Athletic Conference) (2006–2018)
2006–07	Wartburg	13-13	8-8	6th	
2007–08	Wartburg	13-11	6-10	7th	
2008–09	Wartburg	16-11	10-6	2nd	
2009–10	Wartburg	18-8	12-4	3rd	
2010–11	Wartburg	21-5	12-4	3rd	
2011–12	Wartburg	18-9	10-6	T-3rd	
2012–13	Wartburg	16-10	9-5	2nd	
2013–14	Wartburg	12-15	5-9	T–5th	
2014–15	Wartburg	17-11	6-8	T-5th	
2015–16	Wartburg	23-8	9-5	3rd	NCAA Final Four
2016–17	Wartburg	25-3	15-1	1st	NCAA First Round
2017–18	Wartburg	31-1	16-0	1st	NCAA Final Four
Wartburg Knights (American Rivers Conference) (2018–Present)
2018-19	Wartburg	27-4	15-1	1st	NCAA Elite Eight
2019-20	Wartburg	25-4	14-2	1st	NCAA Second Round
2020-21	Wartburg	13-3	6-2	T-2nd	No postseason; COVID-19
2021-22	Wartburg	21-6	13-3	2nd	NCAA First Round
2022-23	Wartburg	23-7	15-1	1st	NCAA Sweet Sixteen
2023-24	Wartburg	29-3	16-0	1st	NCAA Final Four
2024–25	Wartburg	26–3	16–0	1st	NCAA Second Round
2025–26	Wartburg	20–7	15–1	1st	
Wartburg:		407–142 (.741)	218–76 (.741)		
Total:		538–249 (.684)			
National champion Postseason invitational champion Conference regular season champion Conference regular season and conference tournament champion Division regular season champion Division regular season and conference tournament champion Conference tournament champion
