= Juli Fulks =

American women's basketball coach

Current position
- Title: Head coach
- Team: Marshall
- Conference: Sun Belt
- Record: 44–29 (.603)

Biographical details
- Born: Dola, Ohio, U.S.
- Education: Capital University (BS); Defiance College (MA); University of the Cumberlands (PhD)

Playing career
- 1996–2000: Capital

Coaching career (HC unless noted)
- 2000–2002: Westerville North HS (OH) (assistant)
- 2002–2004: Defiance (assistant)
- 2004–2014: Lewis & Clark
- 2014–2024: Transylvania
- 2024–present: Marshall

Head coaching record
- Overall: 444–172 (.721)
- Tournaments: 17–8 (NCAA Division III); 5–0 (WNIT)

Accomplishments and honors

Championships
- NCAA Division III Tournament (2023); 2× NCAA Regional—Final Four (2023, 2024); 6× HCAC regular season (2015, 2019, 2020, 2022, 2023, 2024); 6× HCAC tournament (2019, 2020, 2021, 2022, 2023, 2024); 2× NWC regular season (2011, 2013); WNIT (2026)

Awards
- WBCA DIII National Coach of the Year (2024); 5× HCAC Coach of the Year (2015, 2019, 2022, 2023, 2024); NWC Coach of the Year (2011)

Juli Fulks is an American college basketball coach who is serving as the head coach of the Marshall Thundering Herd women's basketball team. She previously served in the same role at Transylvania University for ten seasons, where the team won six regular season conference championships, six conference tournament championships, and won the 2023 NCAA Division III National Championship.

== Playing career ==
Fulks played high school basketball at Hardin Northern High School in Dola, Ohio, where she broke the record for most points scored in a career at the school. In 2023, she was inducted into the Hardin County Sports Hall of Fame for her achievement. As a collegiate player at Capital, Fulks was a member of the 1997 Final Four team. She graduated with a major in biology with a minor in psychology in 2000.

== Coaching career ==
Fulks began her collegiate coaching career in 2002 at Defiance College after spending two seasons as an assistant coach at Westerville North High School girl's varsity basketball team. Fulks was hired as head coach at Lewis & Clark College in 2004 and was the team's winningest head coach in program history at the time of her departure in 2014.

Fulks left Lewis & Clark to become head coach at Transylvania University 2014. At Transylvania, she led the Pioneers to the school's first national championship when they defeated Christopher Newport University in the 2023 NCAA tournament. In 2024, Fulks was named WBCA National Coach of the Year Award.

On April 12, 2024, it was announced that Fulks was named the head coach for the Marshall Thundering Herd, replacing Kim Caldwell. After winning the 2026 WNIT, Marshall extended her contract through the 2030/31 season.

== Head coaching record ==
Record table
Season	Team	Overall	Conference	Standing	Postseason
Lewis & Clark Pioneers (Northwest Conference) (2004–2014)
2004–05	Lewis & Clark	5–20	1–15	8th	
2005–06	Lewis & Clark	12–12	8–8	5th	
2006–07	Lewis & Clark	16–9	9–7	T–3rd	
2007–08	Lewis & Clark	14–12	10–6	3rd	
2008–09	Lewis & Clark	11–14	5–11	7th	
2009–10	Lewis & Clark	16–10	10–6	T–3rd	
2010–11	Lewis & Clark	31–7	14–2	T–1st	NCAA Division III First Round
2011–12	Lewis & Clark	24–4	14–2	2nd	NCAA Division III Second Round
2012–13	Lewis & Clark	25–4	14–2	1st	NCAA Division III Second Round
2013–14	Lewis & Clark	13–12	8–8	5th	
Lewis & Clark:		158–104	93–67		
Transylvania Pioneers (Heartland Collegiate Athletic Conference) (2014–2024)
2014–15	Transylvania	25–3	18–0	1st	NCAA Division III First Round
2015–16	Transylvania	19–8	14–4	T–2nd	
2016–17	Transylvania	20–8	12–6	3rd	
2017–18	Transylvania	21–6	15–3	2nd	
2018–19	Transylvania	27–3	17–1	1st	NCAA Division III Regional Semifinals
2019–20	Transylvania	25–3	17–1	T–1st	NCAA Division III First Round
2020–21	Transylvania	14–6	0–0		No postseason held
2021–22	Transylvania	27–1	13–0	1st	NCAA Division III Elite Eight
2022–23	Transylvania	33–0	18–0	1st	NCAA Division III Champions
2023–24	Transylvania	31–1	18–0	1st	NCAA Division III Final Four
Transylvania:		242–39	142–15		
Marshall Thundering Herd (Sun Belt Conference) (2024–present)
2024–25	Marshall	15–20	6–12	T–11th	
2025–26	Marshall	28–9	13–5	5th	WNIT Champions
2026–27	Marshall	1–0	0–0		
Marshall:		44–29 (.603)	19–17 (.528)		
Total:		444–172 (.721)			
National champion Postseason invitational champion Conference regular season champion Conference regular season and conference tournament champion Division regular season champion Division regular season and conference tournament champion Conference tournament champion
