= Carla Berube =

American basketball player and coach

Current position
- Title: Head coach
- Team: Northwestern
- Conference: Big Ten
- Record: 0–0 (–)

Biographical details
- Born: September 2, 1975 (age 51); Oxford, Massachusetts, U.S.

Playing career
- 1993–1997: Connecticut
- 1997–1999: New England Blizzard
- Position: Forward

Coaching career (HC unless noted)
- 2000–2002: Providence (assistant)
- 2002–2019: Tufts
- 2019–2026: Princeton
- 2026–present: Northwestern

Head coaching record
- Overall: 531–125 (.809)

Accomplishments and honors

Awards
- As player: NCAA champion (1995); Big East All-Freshman Team (1994); As coach: 4× NCAA Division III Regional – Final Four (2014–2017); 3× NESCAC (2014, 2015, 2019); 3× Ivy League regular season (2020, 2022, 2026); 4× Ivy League tournament championship (2022–2024, 2026); NCAA Division III National Coach of the Year (2015); 5× NESCAC Coach of the Year; 2× Ivy League Coach of the Year (2020, 2022)

Carla Berube (born September 2, 1975) is an American college basketball coach and former basketball player. She is the current head coach of Northwestern.

She previously spent 17 years as the head coach of the women's basketball team at Tufts University, where she compiled a record of 384–96, followed by seven years at Princeton. Berube played college basketball for the UConn Huskies.

== Playing career ==
Berube graduated from Oxford High School in Oxford, Massachusetts, where she played basketball, and won two state titles. She then played for Geno Auriemma at the University of Connecticut, where she scored 1,381 points and had a record of 132–8 record during her four years there. This included being a member of the 1995 team that went 35–0, winning the school's first national championship.

Berube was selected by the New England Blizzard with the 21st selection in the 1997 ABL draft. She averaged 2.6 points in 46 games over two seasons before the league ceased operations in 1999.

== Coaching career ==
Berube was hired by Providence College as an assistant women's basketball coach in August 2000. In 2002, she was hired to be the head coach for D3 Tufts University. Over 17 seasons, she went 384–96 with two championship game appearances and four Final Fours. She was awarded the Pat Summitt Trophy as the United States Marine Corps/Women's Basketball Coaches' Association NCAA Division III National Coach of the Year in 2015.

Berube was named head coach of the 2017 USA Women's U16 National Team and led the team to an undefeated 5–0 record and gold medal finish at the FIBA Americas U16 Championship. In 2018, Berube coached the USA Women's U17 National Team to a perfect 7–0 record and another gold medal at the FIBA U17 World Cup in Minsk, Belarus.

In 2019, Berube left Tufts to become the head coach for Princeton. In her first year at Princeton, Berube compiled a 29–1 record, including an undefeated 14–0 record in Ivy League play, and was named Ivy League Coach of the Year. She finished her career at Princeton with a 147–29 record.

On March 25, 2026, Berube was named the seventh head coach in program history for Northwestern.

== Head coaching record ==
Record table
Season	Team	Overall	Conference	Standing	Postseason
Tufts Jumbos (New England Small College Athletic Conference) (2002–2019)
2002–03	Tufts	17–7			
2003–04	Tufts	18–6			
2004–05	Tufts	14–10			
2005–06	Tufts	10–13			
2006–07	Tufts	18–8	8–1	2nd	
2007–08	Tufts	26–4	7–2	2nd	NCAA Division III Elite Eight
2008–09	Tufts	22–5	7–2	3rd	NCAA Division III Second Round
2009–10	Tufts	21–6	6–3	4th	NCAA Division III Second Round
2010–11	Tufts	18–6	5–4	5th	
2011–12	Tufts	23–7	8–2	2nd	NCAA Division III Sweet Sixteen
2012–13	Tufts	25–3	9–1	1st	NCAA Division III Sweet Sixteen
2013–14	Tufts	30–3	10–0	1st	NCAA Division III Final Four
2014–15	Tufts	30–3	10–0	1st	NCAA Division III Final Four
2015–16	Tufts	28–4	10–0	1st	NCAA Division III Runner-up
2016–17	Tufts	30–3	9–1	2nd	NCAA Division III Runner-up
2017–18	Tufts	26–5	8–2	3rd	NCAA Division III Elite Eight
2018–19	Tufts	28–3	8–2	3rd	NCAA Division III Elite Eight
Tufts:		384–96 (.800)	105–20 (.840)		
Princeton Tigers (Ivy League) (2019–2026)
2019–20	Princeton	26–1	14–0	1st	Postseason not held
2020–21	Princeton	0–0	0–0	N/A	Ivy League Cancelled Season
2021–22	Princeton	25–5	14–0	2nd	NCAA Division I Second Round
2022–23	Princeton	24–6	12–2	T–1st	NCAA Division I Second Round
2023–24	Princeton	25–5	13–1	T–1st	NCAA Division I First Round
2024–25	Princeton	21–8	12–2	2nd	NCAA Division I First Four
2025–26	Princeton	26–4	12–2	1st	NCAA Division I First Round
Princeton:		147–29 (.835)	67–7 (.905)		
Northwestern Wildcats (Big Ten Conference) (2026–present)
2026–27	Northwestern				
Northwestern:		0–0 (–)	0–0 (–)		
Total:		531–125 (.809)			
National champion Postseason invitational champion Conference regular season champion Conference regular season and conference tournament champion Division regular season champion Division regular season and conference tournament champion Conference tournament champion

== Career statistics ==
=== College ===
Year	Team	GP	GS	MPG	FG%	3P%	FT%	RPG	APG	SPG	BPG	TO	PPG
1993–94	Connecticut	33	-	-	54.1	38.2	69.7	4.9	3.1	1.2	0.2	-	11.3
1994–95	Connecticut	33	-	-	45.9	31.3	67.6	4.8	1.9	0.8	0.1	-	8.5
1995–96	Connecticut	38	-	-	47.6	40.6	76.0	4.6	3.0	0.9	0.2	-	9.0
1996–97	Connecticut	34	-	-	56.8	45.8	72.1	5.4	3.1	1.2	0.3	-	11.4
Career		138	-	-	51.3	38.5	71.3	4.9	2.8	1.0	0.2	-	10.0
Statistics retrieved from Sports-Reference.

== Personal life ==
Carla Berube is a lesbian. She has been married to wife Megan and they have three children, sons Parker and Caden, and daughter Brogan.
