= Meg Barber =

American basketball coach (born 1980)

Current position
- Title: Head coach
- Team: NYU
- Conference: UAA
- Record: 179–22 (.891)

Biographical details
- Born: September 15, 1980 (age 46); Hoosick Falls, New York, U.S.
- Education: NYU (B.A., 2002); Temple (M.S., 2015)

Playing career
- 1998–2002: NYU
- Position: Guard/Forward

Coaching career (HC unless noted)
- 2002–2005: Utica (assistant)
- 2005–2012: William & Mary (assistant/associate HC)
- 2012–2016: Temple (assistant)
- 2018–present: NYU

Head coaching record
- Overall: 179–22 (.891)
- Tournaments: 23–4 (NCAA); 3–0 (ECAC)

Accomplishments and honors

Championships
- 2× NCAA Division III (2024, 2025); 5× UAA regular season (2022–2026); Eastern College Athletic Conference Division III (2019)

Awards
- 2× WBCA Division III Coach of the Year (2022, 2025); D3hoops.com Coach of the Year (2024); 3× MBWA Division III Coach of the Year (2022, 2024, 2025); USA Basketball 5-on-5 Junior Coach of the Year (2024); 3× UAA Coaching Staff of the Year (2022, 2024, 2025); 2× First Team All-UAA (2001, 2002); First Team All-ECAC (2002); 2× ECAC Metro Most Outstanding Player (2000, 2002)

Margaret Barber (born September 15, 1980) is an American college basketball coach who is currently the head women's basketball coach at New York University. Under her leadership, NYU won back-to-back NCAA Division III National Championships in 2024 and 2025, completing consecutive undefeated 31–0 seasons. Prior to becoming a head coach, Barber served as an assistant and associate head coach at Division I programs The College of William & Mary and Temple University.

== Playing career ==
Barber grew up in Hoosick Falls, New York. She was a 1,000-point scorer in basketball and scored 1,643 career points, setting the school record for girls basketball upon her graduation in 1998. In her senior season, she scored 586 points, which ranked 13th all-time in Section II history at the time.

Barber played college basketball at New York University from 1998 to 2002, where she was a four-year member of the Violets women's basketball team. She scored 1,228 career points, ranking 10th on NYU's all-time scoring list. During her playing career, NYU compiled a 93–18 record and reached the NCAA Tournament Elite Eight in 1999 and 2001, while also winning two ECAC Metro Championships. The team achieved a No. 1 national ranking during the 2000–01 season.

== Coaching career ==
=== Utica College ===
Following her graduation from NYU, Barber began her coaching career as an assistant coach at Utica College from 2002 to 2005. Her responsibilities included film breakdown, scouting, team defense, and coordinating recruiting visits. She also served as co-director of the Utica College Girls Basketball Camp from 2002 to 2004.

=== College of William & Mary ===
In 2005, Barber joined the College of William & Mary as an assistant coach. During her seven seasons with the Tribe, the program experienced one of the biggest turnarounds in Division I women's basketball, improving from a 5–24 record to 20–12. She was promoted to associate head coach in 2010. Barber played a key role in developing several prominent players, including Kyra Kaylor, who was named Colonial Athletic Association (CAA) Player of the Year in 2006, Taysha Pye, a four-time All-CAA selection from 2009 to 2012, and Tiffany Benson, who became the CAA's all-time leading shot blocker and the league's 2009 Defender of the Year. Under Barber's coaching, the Tribe posted four of the top five rebounding seasons in school history.

=== Temple University ===
From 2012 to 2016, Barber served as an assistant coach at Temple University. She helped lead the Owls to consecutive 20-win seasons and berths in the Women's National Invitation Tournament in 2015 and 2016. While at Temple, she earned a Master of Science degree in Sports Business in 2015 and was also a candidate for Juris Doctor at Temple University Beasley School of Law before returning to coaching.

=== New York University (2018–present) ===
Barber was named the 11th head coach in NYU women's basketball history on June 5, 2018, returning to her alma mater. In her inaugural season (2018–19), she led the Violets to a 17–10 overall record and a 6–8 mark in the UAA. The season culminated with NYU winning the ECAC Division III Championship with an 82–74 victory over Cabrini University. Barber was recognized as ECAC Division III Coach of the Year, MBWA DIII Coach of the Year, and was a WBCA DIII National Coach of the Year Finalist.

The program quickly ascended to national prominence under Barber's leadership. In the 2021–22 season, NYU reached the Elite Eight of the NCAA Tournament with a 27–3 record and won the UAA regular season championship. Barber was named WBCA Division III Coach of the Year, the first such honor in NYU program history. She coached UAA Player of the Year Jenny Walker and D3hoops.com National Rookie of the Year Belle Pellecchia.

NYU returned to the Elite Eight in 2022–23, finishing 29-2 and winning another UAA title. The team ranked sixth nationally by the WBCA. In the 2023–24 season, Barber led NYU to its first national championship, finishing with a perfect 31-0 record. The Violets defeated Smith College in the championship game to cap an undefeated season, the first in program history. NYU ranked first in NCAA Division III in field goal percentage (49.0%), third in three-point percentage (37.1%), fourth in scoring margin (+26.1), and sixth in both blocks (6.2) and assists (18.5) per game. The championship marked the first for NYU women's basketball since 1997.

=== USA Basketball ===
In May 2024, Barber was selected as head coach of the USA Basketball Women's U17 National Team for the 2024 FIBA U17 Women's World Cup in Mexico. She became the second-ever NCAA Division III coach to lead the U17 Women's National Team and the first in the history of NYU or the University Athletic Association. The team went 7-0 and won the gold medal in Leon, Mexico, in July 2024, defeating Canada 84–64 in the final.

=== Recognition ===
In 2022, Barber won her first WBCA Coach of the Year award and received the Pat Summitt Trophy, named for the late University of Tennessee coach and awarded annually to the coaches of the year in each of the WBCA's membership divisions. In 2024, Barber was named 2024 USA Basketball's Junior Coach of the Year. In 2025, Barber was awarded the 2025 WBCA NCAA Division III Coach of the Year for the second time.

== Head coaching record ==
Record table
Season	Team	Overall	Conference	Standing	Postseason
NYU Violets (University Athletic Association) (2018–present)
2018–19	NYU	17–10	6–8	6th	ECAC Champion
2019–20	NYU	21–6	10–4	T–2nd	NCAA Second Round
2021–22	NYU	25–2	13–1	1st	NCAA Elite Eight
2022–23	NYU	25–3	12–2	1st	NCAA Elite Eight
2023–24	NYU	31–0	14–0	1st	NCAA National Champion
2024–25	NYU	31–0	14–0	1st	NCAA National Champion
2025-26	NYU	29–1	14–0	1st	NCAA Final Four
NYU:		179–22 (.891)			
Total:		179–22 (.891)			
National champion Postseason invitational champion Conference regular season champion Conference regular season and conference tournament champion Division regular season champion Division regular season and conference tournament champion Conference tournament champion
