= 2026 NCAA Division III women's basketball tournament =

American college basketball tournament

- Teams: 64
- Finals site: Cregger Center, Salem, Virginia
- Champions: Denison (1st title)
- Runner-up: Scranton (2nd title game)
- Semifinalists: NYU (5th Final Four); Wisconsin–Oshkosh (4th Final Four)
- Winning coach: Maureen Hirt (1st title)
- MOP: Abby Cooch (Denison)

The 2026 NCAA Division III women's basketball tournament was the tournament hosted by the NCAA to determine the national champion of Division III women's college basketball among its member programs in the United States, culminating the 2025–26 season. It featured a field of 64 teams.

The first four rounds were played on campus sites, and the national semifinals and finals were held at the Cregger Center at Roanoke College in Salem, Virginia, from March 19–21, 2026.

NYU's 91 game win streak was snapped in the Final Four by Scranton, it was the second longest streak in NCAA history.

Denison defeated Scranton in the final, 55–41, to claim the Big Red's first NCAA national title. Denison's Abby Cooch was named the tournament Most Outstanding Player.

== Qualifying ==
A total of sixty-four bids are available for the tournament: Forty-three (43) automatic bids—awarded to the champions of the forty-three NCAA Division III conferences guaranteed a spot in the tournament and twenty-one (21) at-large bids to the highest rated programs that failed to win their respective leagues.

== Tournament schedule and venues ==
2026 NCAA Division III Women's Tournament sites Campus sites, Hosted first four rounds Final Four

The first and second rounds took place on campus sites from March 6–7, 2026. Teams were sent to one of sixteen host campus sites, which all corresponded to the home arena of one of the four teams in each grouping of four teams.

The third and fourth rounds (the sectional semifinals and finals), will take place on campus sites from March 13–14, 2026. Teams will be sent to the home arena of one of the four remaining teams in their sectional bracket.

The national semifinals and finals will be held at a predetermined site, the Cregger Center in Salem, Virginia, hosted by Roanoke College for the second consecutive year. The national semifinals will be played on March 19, and the final will be played on March 21.

== Tournament bracket ==
* – denotes overtime

=== Top left sectional ===
First round March 6, 2026; Campus sites
NYU	108
Maine Farmington	44
New York, NY
Messiah	64
Cortland	58
Hardin-Simmons	73
Austin	51
Abilene, TX
Claremont-Mudd-Scripps	54
Whitman	70
Bowdoin	51
Emmanuel (MA)	42
Brunswick, ME
Southern Maine	62
JWU-Providence	46
Wisconsin–La Crosse	78
LaGrange	52
Waukesha, WI
Carroll (WI)	74
DePauw	67

Second round March 7, 2026; Campus sites
NYU	70
Messiah	47
Hardin–Simmons	56
Whitman	35
Bowdoin	59
Southern Maine	67
Wisconsin–La Crosse	80
Carroll (WI)	60

Sectional semifinals March 13, 2026; New York, NY
NYU	103
Hardin–Simmons	61
Southern Maine	45
Wisconsin–La Crosse	66

Sectional finals March 14, 2026; New York, NY
NYU	72
Wisconsin–La Crosse	47

=== Bottom left sectional ===
First round March 6, 2026; Campus sites
Scranton	104
Framingham State	39
Scranton, PA
Otterbein	60
Randolph-Macon	45
Bates	71
Merchant Marine	57
Lewiston, ME
Smith	73
Union (NY)	55
Johns Hopkins	100
Hunter	59
Baltimore, MD
Baldwin Wallace	75
William Paterson	51
Concordia-Moorhead	73
Wisconsin–Superior	61
Moorhead, MN
Ripon	84*
Wisconsin–River Falls	81

Second round March 7, 2026; Campus sites
Scranton	82
Otterbein	43
Bates	74*
Smith	70
Johns Hopkins	59
Baldwin Wallace	46
Concordia-Moorhead	68
Ripon	65

Sectional semifinals March 13, 2026; Scranton, PA
Scranton	76
Bates	59
Johns Hopkins	59
Concordia-Moorhead	64

Sectional finals March 14, 2026; Scranton, PA
Scranton	68
Concordia-Moorhead	42

=== Top right sectional ===
First round March 6, 2026; Campus sites
Wisconsin–Oshkosh	53
Webster	37
Oshkosh, WI
Wisconsin Lutheran	65
Saint Mary's (MN)	47
Washington-St. Louis	65
Geneseo	53
Delaware, OH
Ohio Wesleyan	68
DeSales	53
Hope	103
Penn State Behrend	65
Holland, MI
Illinois Wesleyan	61
Washington & Jefferson	53
Wisconsin-Whitewater	70
Transylvania	65
Whitewater, WI
Chicago	60
Gustavus Adolphus	44

Second round March 7, 2026; Campus sites
Wisconsin–Oshkosh	65
Wisconsin Lutheran	56
Washington–St. Louis	73
Ohio Wesleyan	68
Hope	90*
Illinois Wesleyan	85
Wisconsin–Whitewater	46
Chicago	62

Sectional semifinals March 13, 2026; Oshkosh, WI
Wisconsin–Oshkosh	64
Washington–St. Louis	43
Hope	52
Chicago	55

Sectional finals March 14, 2026; Oshkosh, WI
Wisconsin–Oshkosh	73
Chicago	56

=== Bottom right sectional ===
First round March 6, 2026; Campus sites
Washington & Lee	73
St. Mary's (MD)	44
Lexington, VA
Gettysburg	62
Christopher Newport	74
Bethel (MN)	81
Millsaps	73
Arden Hills, MN
Wisconsin–Platteville	51
Coe	69
Denison	82
Southern Virginia	47
Granville, OH
Trine	90
Shenandoah	45
John Carroll	84
TCNJ	49
University Heights, OH
New Paltz	67
Immaculata	51

Second round March 7, 2026; Campus sites
Washington & Lee	61
Christopher Newport	55
Bethel (MN)	57
Coe	48
Denison	63
Trine	54
John Carroll	74
New Paltz	54

Sectional semifinals March 13, 2026; Lexington, VA
Washington & Lee	75
Bethel (MN)	67
Denison	86
John Carroll	67

Sectional finals March 14, 2026; Lexington, VA
Washington & Lee	64
Denison	77

=== Final Four ===
National semifinals March 19; Salem, VA
NYU	52
Scranton	60
Wisconsin–Oshkosh	61
Denison	82

National championship March 21; Salem, VA
Scranton	41
Denison	55

== See also ==
- 2026 NCAA Division I women's basketball tournament
- 2026 NCAA Division II women's basketball tournament
- 2026 NAIA women's basketball tournament
- 2026 NCAA Division III men's basketball tournament
