= 2025 NCAA Division III women's basketball tournament =

American college basketball tournament

- Teams: 64
- Finals site: Cregger Center, Salem, Virginia
- Champions: NYU (3rd title)
- Runner-up: Smith (2nd title game)
- Semifinalists: Wisconsin–Oshkosh (3rd Final Four); Wisconsin–Stout (1st Final Four)
- Winning coach: Meg Barber (2nd title)
- MOP: Belle Pellecchia (NYU)
- Attendance: 30,343

The 2025 NCAA Division III women's basketball tournament was the 42nd annual tournament hosted by the NCAA to determine the national champion of Division III women's college basketball among its member programs in the United States, culminating the 2024–25 season. It featured a field of 64 teams.

The first four rounds were played on campus sites frmo March 7–15, and the national semifinals and finals were held at the Cregger Center at Roanoke College in Salem, Virginia, from March 20–22.

NYU won their second-straight title, third overall, and finished the season with a perfect 31–0 record.

== Qualifying ==
A total of sixty-four bids were available for the tournament: Forty-three (43) automatic bids—awarded to the champions of the forty-three NCAA Division III conferences guaranteed a spot in the tournament and twenty-one (21) at-large bids to the highest rated programs that failed to win their respective leagues. The number of automatic bids increased by one this year due to the Collegiate Conference of the South getting an automatic bid.

== Tournament bracket ==
* – denotes overtime

=== Top left sectional ===
First round March 7, 2025
Bowdoin	66
Brooklyn	42
Brunswick, ME
Cortland	48
Endicott	46
Amherst	64
Vassar	49
Northampton, MA
Smith	69
SUNY Cobleskill	59
East Texas Baptist	59
Texas Lutheran	62
Marshall, TX
McMurry	79
California Lutheran	63
Wartburg	57
Wisconsin–Stevens Point	56
St. Peter, MN
Gustavus Adolphus	61
Wisconsin Lutheran	49

Second round March 8, 2025
Bowdoin	67
Cortland	54
Amherst	50
Smith	52
Texas Lutheran	63
McMurry	66
Wartburg	50
Gustavus Adolphus	56

Sectional semifinals March 14, 2025
Bowdoin	47
Smith	53
McMurry	58
Gustavus Adolphus	71

Sectional finals March 15, 2025
Smith	61
Gustavus Adolphus	50

=== Bottom left sectional ===
First round March 7, 2025
Illinois Wesleyan	95
Centre	57
Bloomington, IL
Trine	81*
Transylvania	74
Bethel (MN)	71
DePauw	65
Oshkosh, WI
Wisconsin–Oshkosh	61
Calvin	52
Ohio Wesleyan	87
Immaculata	42
Delaware, OH
Messiah	72
Washington & Jefferson	76*
Washington & Lee	65
Merchant Marine	53
Berea, OH
Baldwin Wallace	63
La Roche	53

Second round March 8, 2025
Illinois Wesleyan	82
Trine	50
Bethel (MN)	49
Wisconsin–Oshkosh	59
Ohio Wesleyan	78
Washington & Jefferson	65
Washington & Lee	71
Baldwin Wallace	75

Sectional semifinals March 14, 2025
Illinois Wesleyan	43
Wisconsin-Oshkosh	63
Ohio Wesleyan	65
Baldwin Wallace	68

Sectional finals March 15, 2025
Wisconsin-Oshkosh	60
Baldwin Wallace	53

=== Top right sectional ===
First round March 7, 2025
NYU	102
Gallaudet	62
New York, NY
UMass Dartmouth	56
Trinity (CT)	59
Christopher Newport	64
Montclair State	67
Washington, D.C.
Catholic	63
Geneseo	74
Randolph–Macon	52
Piedmont	31
Ashland, VA
Elizabethtown	99
Brockport	67
Western New England	61
Tufts	52
Gettysburg, PA
Gettysburg	64
Stevens	46

Second round March 8, 2025
NYU	83
Trinity (CT)	45
Montclair State	49
Geneseo	71
Randolph–Macon	62
Elizabethtown	56
Western New England	52
Gettysburg	55

Sectional semifinals March 14, 2025
NYU	74
Geneseo	53
Randolph-Macon	49
Gettysburg	56

Sectional finals March 15, 2025
NYU	76
Gettysburg	51

=== Bottom right sectional ===
First round March 7, 2025
Whitman	77
Wisconsin–Superior	54
Menomonie, WI
Wisconsin–Stout	87
Ripon	57
Colorado College	52
Wisconsin–La Crosse	79
Whitewater, WI
Wisconsin–Whitewater	75
Principia	53
Johns Hopkins	75
Saint Joseph (CT)	50
Baltimore, MD
Carnegie Mellon	69
Bridgewater State	58
Southern Virginia	53
Bates	55
Scranton, PA
Scranton	93
Mount Saint Mary	35

Second round March 8, 2025
Whitman	69
Wisconsin–Stout	75
Wisconsin–La Crosse	49
Wisconsin–Whitewater	50
Johns Hopkins	68
Carnegie Mellon	58
Bates	49
Scranton	70

Sectional semifinals March 14, 2025
Wisconsin–Stout	62
Wisconsin–Whitewater	56
Johns Hopkins	46
Scranton	52

Sectional finals March 15, 2025
Wisconsin–Stout	81
Scranton	77

=== Final Four ===
National semifinals March 20; Salem, VA
Smith	49
Wisconsin-Oshkosh	47
NYU	74
Wisconsin-Stout	55

National championship March 22; Salem, VA
Smith	49
NYU	77

== See also ==
- 2025 NCAA Division I women's basketball tournament
- 2025 NCAA Division II women's basketball tournament
- 2025 NAIA women's basketball tournament
- 2025 NCAA Division III men's basketball tournament
