= NCAA Division III women's basketball tournament =

Annual tournament

- Current season, competition or edition: 2026 NCAA Division III women's basketball tournament
- Association: NCAA
- Sport: College basketball
- Founded: 1982; 44 years ago
- Division: Division III
- No. of teams: 64
- Country: United States
- Most recent champion: Denison (1st)
- Most titles: Washington St. Louis (5)
- Website: NCAA.com

The NCAA Division III women's basketball championship is the annual tournament organized by the National Collegiate Athletic Association (NCAA) to determine the national champions of women's collegiate basketball among its Division III members in the United States. It has been held every year since 1982 (when the NCAA began to sponsor women's sports at all three levels), except for 2020 and 2021, due to COVID-19.

Washington St. Louis has been the most successful program, with five national titles.

The most recent champions are Denison, who won their first national title in 2026.

== History ==
=== 1982 Final Four ===
Held in Elizabethtown, Pennsylvania, the 1982 Women's Final Four Basketball Tournament was the first sponsored by the NCAA. Featuring host Elizabethtown College, Clark University (Massachusetts), Pomona College and the University of North Carolina at Greensboro, the tournament was played in a classic field house over a three-day period. In the first game of the National Semi-Final Elizabethtown took control right from the tip-off against Clark and easily cruised to a 71–51 victory. In the second game of the Final Four Pomona took the lead early in the game, but UNC Greensboro battled back to tie the game at 56 with six minutes to play. UNC Greensboro then went on a run and pulled away for a 77–66 win. Elizabethtown and UNC Greensboro turned the championship game into an epic battle of lead changes and shifts in momentum. Last-second heroics by UNC Greensboro sent the game into overtime, but Elizabethtown came up with the final stop to win 67–66 in overtime. Television coverage was provided by a fledgling ESPN while exclusive radio coverage was provided by KSPC Radio - Pomona College's tiny KSPC sports broadcasting group with Geoff Willis (Pomona '83) and James Timmerman (Pomona '82) providing the play-by-play and color. ESPN was so embryonic that the game was broadcast multiple times during the following two weeks, and ESPN hired the KSPC Radio staff to help with background and color research about the players and the teams.

== Results ==
NCAA Division III Women's Basketball Championship
Year	Finals site	Arena	Championship game			Semifinalists
Year	Finals site	Arena	Winner	Score	Runner-up	Semifinalists
1982; Details	Elizabethtown, PA	Thompson Gymnasium	Elizabethtown	67–66 (OT)	UNC Greensboro	Pomona-Pitzer, Clark
1983; Details	Worcester, MA	Kneller Athletics Center	North Central (IL)	83–71	Elizabethtown	Knoxville, Clark
1984; Details	Scranton, PA	John Long Center	Rust	51–49	Elizabethtown	Salem St, North Central
1985; Details	De Pere, WI	Schuldes Sports Center	Scranton	68–59	New Rochelle	Millikin, St. Norbert
1986; Details	Salem, MA	Twohig Gymnasium	Salem State	89–85	Bishop (TX)	Capital, Rust
1987; Details	Scranton, PA	John Long Center	UW–Stevens Point	81–74	Concordia–Moorhead	Scranton, Kean
1988; Details	Moorhead, MN	Memorial Auditorium	Concordia–Moorhead	65–57	St. John Fisher	UNC-Greensboro, Southern Maine
1989; Details	Danville, KY	Alumni Gymnasium	Elizabethtown	66–65	Cal State Stanislaus	Centre, Clarkson
1990; Details	Holland, MI	Holland Civic Center	Hope	65–63	St. John Fisher	Heidelberg, Centre
1991; Details	St. Paul, MN	Schoenecker Arena	St. Thomas (MN)	73–55	Muskingum	Eastern Connecticut, Washington St. Louis
1992; Details	Bethlehem, PA	Johnston Hall	Alma	79–75	Moravian	Luther, Eastern Connecticut St
1993; Details	Pella, IA	Kuyper Gymnasium	Central (IA)	71–63	Capital	Scranton, St. Benedict
1994; Details	Eau Claire, WI	W.L. Zorn Arena	Capital	82–63	Washington St. Louis	UW-Eau Claire, Wheaton (MA)
1995; Details	Columbus, OH	Alumni Gymnasium	Capital	59–55	UW–Oshkosh	St. Thomas, Salem State
1996; Details	Oshkosh, WI	Kolf Sports Center	UW–Oshkosh	66–50	Mount Union	St. Thomas, New York University
1997; Details	New York City, NY	Coles Sports Center	NYU	72–70	UW–Eau Claire	Capital, Scranton
1998; Details	Gorham, ME	Warren Hill Gymnasium	Washington St. Louis	77–69	Southern Maine	Mount Union, Rowan
1999; Details	Danbury, CT	O'Neill Center	Washington St. Louis	74–65	St. Benedict	Salem State, Scranton
2000; Details	Danbury, CT	O'Neill Center	Washington St. Louis	79–33	Southern Maine	St. Thomas, Scranton
2001; Details	Danbury, CT	O'Neill Center	Washington St. Louis	67–45	Messiah	Ohio Wesleyan, Emmanuel
2002; Details	Terre Haute, IN	Hulbert Arena	UW–Stevens Point	67–65	St. Lawrence	DePauw, Marymount
2003; Details	Terre Haute, IN	Hulbert Arena	Trinity (TX)	60–58	Eastern Connecticut State	UW-Eau Claire, Rochester
2004; Details	Virginia Beach, VA	Jane P. Batten Student Center	Wilmington (OH)	59–53	Bowdoin	Rochester, UW–Stevens Point
2005; Details	Virginia Beach, VA	Jane P. Batten Student Center	Millikin	70–50	Randolph–Macon	Southern Maine, Scranton
2006; Details	Springfield, MA	Springfield Civic Center	Hope	69–56	Southern Maine	Scranton, Hardin–Simmons
2007; Details	Springfield, MA	Springfield Civic Center	DePauw	55–52	Washington St. Louis	Mary Washington, NYU
2008; Details	Holland, MI	DeVos Fieldhouse	Howard Payne	68–54	Messiah	UW–Whitewater, Oglethorpe
2009; Details	Holland, MI	DeVos Fieldhouse	George Fox	60–53	Washington St. Louis	TCNJ, Amherst
2010; Details	Bloomington, IL	Shirk Center	Washington St. Louis	65–59	Hope	Amherst, Rochester
2011; Details	Bloomington, IL	Shirk Center	Amherst	64–55	Washington St. Louis	Christopher Newport, Illinois Wesleyan
2012; Details	Holland, MI	DeVos Fieldhouse	Illinois Wesleyan	57–48	George Fox	St. Thomas, Amherst
2013; Details	Holland, MI	DeVos Fieldhouse	DePauw	69–51	UW–Whitewater	Williams, Amherst
2014; Details	Stevens Point, WI	Bennett Court at Quandt Fieldhouse	FDU–Florham	80–72	Whitman	UW-Whitewater, Tufts
2015; Details	Grand Rapids, MI	Van Noord Arena	Thomas More (vacated)	83–63	George Fox	Montclair State, Tufts
2016; Details	Indianapolis, IN (Note: Only the final game was held in Indianapolis. The semifinals were held at Performance Arena at Capital University in Columbus, Ohio.)	Bankers Life Fieldhouse	Thomas More	63–51	Tufts	Amherst, Wartburg
2017; Details	Grand Rapids, MI	Van Noord Arena	Amherst	52–29	Tufts	Christopher Newport, St Thomas
2018; Details	Rochester, MN	Mayo Civic Center	Amherst	65–45	Bowdoin	Thomas More, Wartburg
2019 Details	Salem, VA	Cregger Center	Thomas More	81–67	Bowdoin	Scranton, St. Thomas (MN)
2020; Details	Columbus, OH	Capital University Performance Arena	Canceled due to the COVID-19 pandemic			
2021; Details	Salem, VA	Cregger Center	Canceled due to the COVID-19 pandemic			
2022; Details	Pittsburgh, PA	UPMC Cooper Fieldhouse	Hope	71–58	UW–Whitewater	Amherst, Trine
2023; Details	Dallas, TX (Note: Only the final game was held in Dallas. The semifinals were held at Oosting Gymnasium on the campus of Trinity College in Hartford, Connecticut.)	American Airlines Center	Transylvania	57–52	Christopher Newport	Smith, Rhode Island College
2024; Details	Columbus, OH	Capital University Performance Arena	NYU (2)	51–41	Smith	Transylvania, Wartburg
2025; Details	Salem, VA	Cregger Center	NYU (3)	77–49	Smith	UW–Oshkosh, UW–Stout
2026; Details	Salem, VA	Cregger Center	Denison (1)	55–41	Scranton	NYU, UW–Oshkosh
2027	Cedar Rapids, IA	Alliant Energy PowerHouse				
2028	Salem, VA	Cregger Center				

== Championships ==
Schools that have won the NCAA Division III Women's Basketball Championship
– 5 championships – 3 championships
– 2 championships – 1 championship

=== Active programs ===
Team	Titles	Years
Washington University	5	1998, 1999, 2000, 2001, 2010
Amherst	3	2011, 2017, 2018
Hope	3	1990, 2006, 2022
NYU	3	1997, 2024, 2025
DePauw	2	2007, 2013
Wisconsin–Stevens Point	2	1987, 2002
Capital	2	1994, 1995
Elizabethtown	2	1982, 1989
Denison	1	2026
Transylvania	1	2023
FDU Florham	1	2014
Illinois Wesleyan	1	2012
George Fox	1	2009
Howard Payne	1	2008
Millikin	1	2005
Wilmington (OH)	1	2004
Trinity (TX)	1	2003
Wisconsin–Oshkosh	1	1996
Central (IA)	1	1993
Alma	1	1992
Concordia Moorhead	1	1988
Salem State	1	1986
Scranton	1	1985
North Central (IL)	1	1983

=== Former programs ===
Team	Titles	Years
Thomas More (Note: As of 2025–26, this school is a current member of NCAA Division II.)	2	~~2015~~ (Note: 2015 championship vacated by Thomas More, which returned to the National Association of Intercollegiate Athletics (NAIA) in July 2019, but rejoined the NCAA in July 2022, that time as a Division II provisional member, albeit on a one-year dual membership with the NAIA.), 2016, 2019
St. Thomas (MN) (Note: As of 2025–26, this school is a current member of NCAA Division I.)	1	1991
Rust (Note: As of 2025–26, this school is a current member of the NAIA.)	1	1984

== Final Fours ==
Schools in italics no longer compete in NCAA Division III.

Appearances	School
10	Washington St. Louis
8	Amherst, Scranton
6	St. Thomas (MN)
5	Capital, Southern Maine, NYU
4	Elizabethtown, Salem State, Thomas More, Tufts, UW–Oshkosh, UW-Whitewater
3	Christopher Newport, DePauw, Eastern Connecticut, George Fox, Hope, Rochester, UW–Eau Claire, UW–Stevens Point
2	Bowdoin, Centre, Clark, Concordia–Moorhead, Illinois Wesleyan, Messiah, Millikin, Mount Union, North Central (IL), Rust, Saint Benedict, St. John Fisher, Smith, UNC Greensboro, Wartburg

== See also ==
- NCAA Division III men's basketball tournament
- NCAA Division I women's basketball tournament
- NCAA Division II women's basketball tournament
- NAIA women's basketball championship
