= 2014 NCAA Division III women's basketball tournament =

- Teams: 64
- Finals site: Quandt Fieldhouse, Stevens Point, Wisconsin
- Champions: Fairleigh Dickinson–Florham Devils (1st title)
- Runner-up: Whitman Blues (1st title game)
- Third place: Wisconsin–Whitewater Warhawks (3rd Final Four)
- Fourth place: Tufts Jumbos (1st Final Four)
- Winning coach: Marc Mitchell (1st title)
- MOP: Kyra Dayon (FDU Florham)
- Attendance: 26,507

The 2014 NCAA Division III women's basketball tournament was the 33rd annual tournament hosted by the NCAA to determine the national champion of Division III women's collegiate basketball in the United States.

Fairleigh Dickinson–Florham defeated Whitman in the championship game, 80–72, to claim the Devils' first Division III national title.

The championship rounds were hosted by the University of Wisconsin–Stevens Point at the Bennett Court at Quandt Fieldhouse in Stevens Point, Wisconsin.

== Bracket ==
=== Top left sectional ===
First Round; March 7, 2014; Regional sites
Montclair State | 78
Regis (MA) | 51
Montclair, NJ
Cabrini | 76
Moravian | 61
Scranton | 88
Bridgewater State | 63
Scranton, PA
Vassar | 76
Williams | 75
York (PA) | 76
La Roche | 54
York, PA
Lebanon Valley | 48
Baldwin Wallace | 66
FDU Florham | 106
Wells | 45
Florham Park, NJ
Randolph-Macon | 62
Messiah | 91

Second Sound; March 8, 2014; Regional sites
Montclair State | 78*
Cabrini | 73
Scranton | 72
Vassar | 71
York (PA) | 52
Baldwin Wallace | 67
FDU Florham | 79
Messiah | 68

Sectional Semifinals; March 14, 2014; Florham Park, NJ
Montclair State | 82
Scranton | 77
Baldwin Wallace | 42
FDU Florham | 66

Sectional Finals; March 15, 2014; Florham Park, NJ
Montclair State | 53
FDU Florham | 73

=== Bottom left sectional ===
First Round; March 7, 2014; Regional sites
Tufts | 66
Saint Joseph's (ME) | 43
Medford, MA
UNE | 80
NYU | 77
Bowdoin | 62
Castleton | 64
Brunswick, ME
Plattsburgh State | 67
Roger Williams | 56
Ithaca | 67
Sage | 30
Ithaca, NY
Haverford | 53
Rhode Island College | 48
Amherst | 63
Springfield | 49
Amherst, MA
Hartwick | 80*
Baruch | 77

Second Sound; March 8, 2014; Regional sites
Tufts | 57*
UNE | 54
Castleton | 76*
Plattsburgh State | 70
Ithaca | 54
Haverford | 43
Amherst | 82
Hartwick | 61

Sectional Semifinals; March 14, 2014; Medford, MA
Tufts | 55
Castleton | 35
Ithaca | 74*
Amherst | 71

Sectional Finals; March 15, 2014; Medford, MA
Tufts | 61
Ithaca | 59

=== Top right sectional ===
First Round; March 7, 2014; Regional sites
Washington St. Louis | 64
Northwestern St. Paul | 47
Oshkosh, WI
UW Oshkosh | 71
Saint Mary's (MN) | 61
St. Thomas (MN) | 52
Loras | 49
St. Paul, MN
UW Whitewater | 79
Concordia Moorhead | 72
Carthage | 60
St. Norbert | 51
Kenosha, WI
Hope | 60
Wisconsin Lutheran | 54
DePauw | 79
Claremont-Mudd-Scripps | 68
Greencastle, IN
Ohio Northern | 71
Transylvania | 79

Second Sound; March 8, 2014; Regional sites
Washington St. Louis | 66
UW Oshkosh | 72
St. Thomas (MN) | 78
UW Whitewater | 87
Carthage | 72
Hope | 67
DePauw | 76
Transylvania | 68

Sectional Semifinals; March 14, 2014; Greencastle, IN
UW Oshkosh | 57
UW Whitwater | 69
Carthage | 54
DePauw | 73

Sectional Finals; March 15, 2014; Greencastle, IN
UW Whitewater | 88
DePauw | 71

=== Bottom right sectional ===
First Round; March 7, 2014; Regional sites
Rhodes | 83
Spalding | 59
Memphis, TN
UT Tyler | 67
Maryville (TN) | 43
Thomas More | 95
Salem (NC) | 58
Crestview Hills, KY
John Carroll | 74
Texas Lutheran | 62
Ferrum | 73
Capital | 70
Ferrum, VA
Christopher Newport | 78
Eastern Mennonite | 63
Whitman | 106
Chapman | 51
Walla Walla, WA
George Fox | 51
Whitworth | 71

Second Sound; March 8, 2014; Regional sites
Rhodes | 74
UT Tyler | 77
Thomas More | 120
John Carroll | 86
Ferrum | 66
Christopher Newport | 75
Whitman | 73
Whitworth | 67

Sectional Semifinals; March 14, 2014; Walla Walla, WA
UT Tyler | 61
Thomas More | 73
Christopher Newport | 70
Whitman | 87

Sectional Finals; March 15, 2014; Walla Walla, WA
Thomas More | 60
Whitman | 76

=== Final Four ===
Final Four; March 21, 2014; Quandt Fieldhouse; Stevens Point, WI
FDU Florham | 42
Tufts | 39
UW Whitewater | 70
Whitman | 85

National championship March 22, 2014; Quandt Fieldhouse; Stevens Point, WI
FDU Florham | 80
Whitman | 72
Third place
Tufts | 54
UW Whitewater | 72

== All-tournament team ==
- Kyra Dayon, FDU Florham
- Jalessa Lewis, FDU Florham
- Kelsey Morehead, Tufts
- Mary Merg, Wisconsin–Whitewater
- Heather Johns, Whitman

== See also ==
- 2014 NCAA Division I women's basketball tournament
- 2014 NCAA Division II women's basketball tournament
- 2014 NAIA Division I women's basketball tournament
- 2014 NAIA Division II women's basketball tournament
- 2014 NCAA Division III men's basketball tournament
