= 2016 NAIA Division I men's basketball tournament =

College basketball tournament

- Teams: 32
- Finals site: Municipal Auditorium; Kansas City, Missouri
- Champions: Mid-America Christian Evangels (1 title, 1 title game)
- Runner-up: Georgetown (KY) Tigers (6 title game)

The 2016 Buffalo Funds - NAIA Men's Division I Basketball Tournament was held in March at Municipal Auditorium in Kansas City, Missouri. The 79th annual NAIA basketball tournament featured 32 teams playing in a single-elimination format.

== 2016 awards ==
- Most consecutive tournament appearances: 25th, Georgetown (KY)
- Most tournament appearances: 35th, Georgetown (KY)

== 2016 NAIA bracket ==
First round	Second round
1	Georgetown	103
8	Wayland Baptist	82
1	Georgetown	80
4	Arizona Christian	78
4	Arizona Christian	84
5	William Carey	77
Naismith Bracket
3	William Penn	85
6	Montana Western	77
3	William Penn	86
2	Columbia	68
2	Columbia	'94
7	LSU Shreveport	68
2	Pikeville	69
7	William Jessup	82
7	William Jessup	76
3	MidAmerica Nazarene	90
3	MidAmerica Nazarene	87*
6	Oklahoma City	82
Cramer Bracket
4	Freed-Hardeman	81
5	Our Lady of the Lake	87
5	Our Lady of the Lake	83
1	Lewis-Clark State	64
1	Lewis-Clark State	69*
8	Xavier	68
1	Biola	84
8	Faulkner	54
1	Biola	80
4	Mid-America Christian	88
4	Mid-America Christian	88
5	Park	86
Duer Bracket
3	Langston	78
6	Cumberlands	80*
6	Cumberlands	82
2	Talladega	80
2	Talladega	63
7	Westmont	61
2	Hope International	91
7	Dillard	111
7	Dillard	73
6	Campbellsville	81
3	Texas Wesleyan	88
6	Campbellsville	91
Lister Bracket
4	Peru State	82
5	Carroll	99
5	Carroll	66
1	LSU Alexandria	60
1	LSU Alexandria	95
8	SAGU	74

Quarterfinals
1	Georgetown	99
3	William Penn	80
3	MidAmerica Nazarene	95
5	Our Lady of the Lake	82
4	Mid-America Christian	77
6	Cumberlands	73
6	Campbellsville	83
5	Carroll	67

Semifinals
1	Georgetown	90
3	MidAmerica Nazarene	83
4	Mid-America Christian	93
6	Campbellsville	89

NAIA national championship
1	Georgetown	99
4	Mid-America Christian	100*

- denotes overtime

== See also ==
- 2016 NAIA Division I women's basketball tournament
- 2016 NCAA Division I men's basketball tournament
- 2016 NCAA Division II men's basketball tournament
- 2016 NCAA Division III men's basketball tournament
- 2016 NAIA Division II men's basketball tournament
