= 2018 NAIA Division I women's basketball tournament =

- Teams: 32
- Finals site: Rimrock Auto Arena at MetraPark, Billings, Montana
- Champions: Freed–Hardeman Lions (1st title, 2nd title game, 7th Fab Four)
- Runner-up: Westmont Warriors (2nd title game, 3rd Fab Four)
- Semifinalists: Montana Western Bulldogs (1st Fab Four); Wayland Baptist Flying Queens (4th Fab Four)
- Coach of the year: Dale Neal (Freed–Hardeman)
- Player of the year: DaJonee Hale (Central Methodist)
- Charles Stevenson Hustle Award: Joy Krupa (Westmont)
- Chuck Taylor MVP: Kim Mallory (Freed–Hardeman)
- Top scorer: Kayla Styles (Lindsey Wilson) (63 points)

The 2018 NAIA Division I women's basketball tournament was the tournament held by the NAIA to determine the national champion of women's college basketball among its Division I members in the United States and Canada for the 2017–18 basketball season.

Freed–Hardeman defeated Westmont in the championship game, 76–64, to claim the Lions' first NAIA national title.

The tournament was played at the Rimrock Auto Arena at MetraPark in Billings, Montana.

== Qualification ==
The tournament field remained fixed at thirty-two teams. For the first time, no teams received a seed.

The tournament continued to utilize a simple single-elimination format.

== Bracket ==
First round
Benedictine (KS)	68
Columbia (MO)	59
LSU Shreveport	79
Menlo	91
Campbellsville	79
Faulkner	63
Dillard	54
Montana Western	66
Freed–Hardeman	71
The Master's	51
Rocky Mountain	52
USAO	60
Arizona Christian	86
Central Methodist	98
Lindsey Wilson	75
Martin Methodist	69
Loyola New Orleans	89
Our Lady of the Lake	86
Cumberland (TN)	51
Westmont	57
Lindenwood Belleville	72
MidAmerica Nazarene	82
Oklahoma City	76
Providence (MT)	81
Lyon (AR)	62
Wayland Baptist	78
Grand View	82
Shawnee State	88
Carroll (MT)	55
William Penn	49
Bethel (TN)	57
Vanguard	76

Second round
Benedictine (KS)	78
Menlo	88
Campbellsville	57
Montana Western	60
Freed–Hardeman	78
USAO	50
Central Missouri	88
Lindsey Wilson	73
Loyola New Orleans	65
Westmont	77
MidAmerica Nazarene	83
Providence (MT)	67
Wayland Baptist	79
Shawnee State	69
Carroll (MT)	55
Vanguard	63

Quarterfinals
Menlo	61
Montana Western	74
Freed–Hardeman	82
Central Methodist	74
Westmont	65
MidAmerica Nazarene	54
Wayland Baptist	68
Vanguard	44

Semifinals
Montana Western	50
Freed–Hardeman	61
Westmont	56
Wayland Baptist	54

National championship
Freed–Hardeman	76
Westmont	64

== See also ==
- 2018 NAIA Division I men's basketball tournament
- 2018 NCAA Division I women's basketball tournament
- 2018 NCAA Division II women's basketball tournament
- 2018 NCAA Division III women's basketball tournament
- 2018 NAIA Division II women's basketball tournament
