= 2016 NAIA Division I women's basketball tournament =

- Teams: 32
- Finals site: Independence Events Center, Independence, Missouri
- Champions: MidAmerica Nazarene Pioneers (1st title, 1st title game, 1st Fab Four)
- Runner-up: Baker Wildcats (1st title game, 1st Fab Four)
- Semifinalists: Benedictine Ravens (1st Fab Four); Pikeville Bears (1st Fab Four)
- Coach of the year: Jon Lewis (MidAmerica Nazarene)
- Player of the year: Lindsey Burd (Campbellsville)
- Charles Stevenson Hustle Award: Jasmine Webb (MidAmerica Nazarene)
- Chuck Taylor MVP: Kyleesha Weston (MidAmerica Nazarene)
- Top scorer: Erin Legel (Campbellsville) (60 points)

The 2016 NAIA Division I women's basketball tournament was the tournament held by the NAIA to determine the national champion of women's college basketball among its Division I members in the United States and Canada for the 2015–16 basketball season.

MidAmerica Nazarene defeated Baker (KS) in the championship game, 49–35, to claim the Pioneers' first NAIA national title.

The tournament was played at the Independence Events Center in Independence, Missouri.

== Qualification ==
The tournament field remained fixed at thirty-two teams, which were sorted into four quadrants of eight teams each. Within each quadrant, teams were seeded sequentially from one to eight based on record and season performance.

The tournament continued to utilize a simple single-elimination format.

== Bracket ==
First round
1	Our Lady of the Lake	82
8	William Woods	52
5	Benedictine (KS)	55*
4	Montana State Northern	53
3	The Master's	59
6	Loyola New Orleans	57
7	Xavier Louisiana	50
2	Campbellsville	75
2	Shawnee State	77
7	Langston	69
6	Baker (KS)	80
3	Columbia (MO)	71
4	Lewis–Clark State	67
5	Oklahoma City	52
8	Cumberland (TN)	56
1	Bethel (TN)	51
1	Lyon (AR)	58
8	LSU Shreveport	48
5	Great Falls	70
4	Central Methodist	58
3	Wayland Baptist	65
6	Pikeville	70
7	Auburn Montgomery	53
2	Vanguard	60
2	MidAmerica Nazarene	68
7	Martin Methodist	53
6	Carroll (MT)	44
3	Freed–Hardeman	51
4	Talladega	67
5	Lindsey Wilson	69
8	Huston–Tillotson	47
1	Westmont	82

Second round
1	Our Lady of the Lake	63
5	Benedictine (KS)	71
3	The Master's	55
2	Campbellsville	62
2	Shawnee State	56
6	Baker (KS)	70
4	Lewis–Clark State	75
8	Cumberland (TN)	70
1	Lyon (AR)	50
5	Great Falls	60
6	Pikeville	77
2	Vanguard	57
2	MidAmerica Nazarene	59
3	Freed–Hardeman	51
5	Lindsey Wilson	63
1	Westmont	59

Quarterfinals
5	Benedictine (KS)	45
2	Campbellsville	36
6	Baker (KS)	71
4	Lewis–Clark State	52
5	Great Falls	68
6	Pikeville	75
2	MidAmerica Nazarene	60
5	Lindsey Wilson	44

Semifinals
5	Benedictine (KS)	34
6	Baker (KS)	50
6	Pikeville	70
2	MidAmerica Nazarene	78

National championship
6	Baker (KS)	35
2	MidAmerica Nazarene	49

== See also ==
- 2016 NAIA Division I men's basketball tournament
- 2016 NCAA Division I women's basketball tournament
- 2016 NCAA Division II women's basketball tournament
- 2016 NCAA Division III women's basketball tournament
- 2016 NAIA Division II women's basketball tournament
