= 2013 NCAA Division III women's basketball tournament =

- Teams: 64
- Finals site: DeVos Fieldhouse, Holland, Michigan
- Champions: DePauw Tigers (2nd title)
- Runner-up: Wisconsin–Whitewater Warhawks (1st title game)
- Third place: Williams Ephs (1st Final Four)
- Fourth place: Amherst Lord Jeffs (5th Final Four)
- Winning coach: Kris Huffman (2nd title)
- MOP: Ellie Pearson (DePauw)
- Attendance: 28,909

The 2013 NCAA Division III women's basketball tournament was the 32nd annual tournament hosted by the NCAA to determine the national champion of Division III women's collegiate basketball in the United States.

DePauw defeated Wisconsin–Whitewater in the championship game, 69–51, to claim the Tigers' second Division III national title and first since 2007.

The championship rounds were hosted by Hope College at the DeVos Fieldhouse in Holland, Michigan.

== Bracket ==
=== Top left sectional ===
First round March 1, 2013; Regional sites
Catholic	52
Cabrini	44
Washington, DC
FDU Florham	52
Widener	56
Messiah	84
Lancaster Bible	51
Grantham, PA
Gettysburg	64
William Paterson	71
Amherst	67
Farmingdale State	39
Amherst, MA
Bridgewater State	58
UNE	67
Tufts	57
St. Lawrence	32
Medford, MA
New Paltz State	45
Babson	61

Second round March 2, 2013; Regional sites
Catholic	56
Widener	57
Messiah	78
William Paterson	70
Amherst	71
UNE	34
Tufts	53
Babson	35

Sectional semifinals March 8, 2013; Amherst, MA
Widener	67
Messiah	52
Amherst	49
Tufts	42

Sectional finals March 9, 2013; Amherst, MA
Widener	45
Amherst	59

=== Bottom left sectional ===
First round March 1, 2013; Regional sites
Cornell College	76
St. Scholastica	54
Mount Vernon, IA
St. Thomas (MN)	64
Calvin	62
Ohio Northern	86
Hanover	68
Holland, MI
Hope	64
Wheaton (IL)	37
Simpson	91
Westminster (MO)	58
Indianola, IA
UW Stevens Point	72
Concordia Moorhead	64
UW Whitewater	68
Wisconsin Lutheran	48
Whitewater, WI
Carthage	72
Thomas More	55

Second round March 2, 2013; Regional sites
Cornell College	52
St. Thomas (MN)	53
Ohio Northern	48
Hope	63
Simpson	88
UW Stevens Point	84
UW Whitewater	71
Carthage	51

Sectional semifinals March 8, 2013; Whitewater, WI
St. Thomas (MN)	61
Hope	71
Simpson	63
UW Whitewater	76

Sectional finals March 9, 2013; Whitewater, WI
Hope	60
UW Whitewater	65

=== Top right sectional ===
First round March 1, 2013; Regional sites
DePauw	73
La Roche	43
Greencastle, IN
Maryville (TN)	68
Otterbein	61
Louisiana College	58
Rhodes	59
Memphis, TN
Washington St. Louis	45
UT Dallas	40
Christopher Newport	66
Guilford	47
Newport News, VA
Marymount (VA)	55
Eastern Mennonite	42
Montclair State	87
Regis (MA)	47
Annville, PA
Lebanon Valley	59
Baruch	53

Second round March 2, 2013; Regional sites
DePauw	78
Maryville (TN)	51
Rhodes	75
Washington St. Louis	78
Christopher Newport	55
Marymount (VA)	50
Montclair State	71
Lebanon Valley	51

Sectional semifinals March 8, 2013; Greencastle, IN
DePauw	59
Washington St. Louis	42
Christopher Newport	55
Montclair State	50

Sectional finals March 9, 2013; Greencastle, IN
DePauw	76
Christopher Newport	55

=== Bottom right sectional ===
First round March 1, 2013; Regional sites
Rochester (NY)	70
Emmanuel (MA)	66
Rochester, NY
Scranton	59
Williams	79
Ithaca	56
Colby-Sawyer	43
Gorham, ME
Southern Maine	58
Smith	80
Lewis & Clark	78
Trinity (TX)	49
Portland, OR
Whitman	61
Cal Lutheran	37
Ferrum	67
Huntingdon	84
Atlanta, GA
Whitworth	65
Emory	72

Second round March 2, 2013; Regional sites
Rochester	60
Williams	68
Ithaca	73
Smith	50
Lewis & Clark	57
Whitman	66
Huntingdon	62
Emory	88

Sectional semifinals March 8, 2013; Williamstown, MA
Williams	64
Ithaca	60
Whitman	66
Emory	57

Sectional finals March 9, 2013; Williamstown, MA
Williams	63
Whitman	53

=== Final Four ===
Final Four; March 15, 2013; DeVos Fieldhouse; Holland, MI
Amherst	62
UW Whitewater	64*
DePauw	59
Williams	56

National championship March 16, 2013; DeVos Fieldhouse; Holland, MI
UW Whitewater	51
DePauw	69
Third place
Amherst	53
Williams	57

== All-tournament team ==
- Ellie Pearson, DePauw
- Kate Walker, DePauw
- Cortney Kumerow, Wisconsin–Whitewater
- Marcia Voigt, Amherst
- Danny Rainer, Williams

== See also ==
- 2013 NCAA Division I women's basketball tournament
- 2013 NCAA Division II women's basketball tournament
- 2013 NAIA Division I women's basketball tournament
- 2013 NAIA Division II women's basketball tournament
- 2013 NCAA Division III men's basketball tournament
