= 2016 NCAA Division III women's basketball tournament =

Collegiate basketball tournament

- Teams: 64
- Finals site: Bankers Life Fieldhouse (championship); Capital University Performance Arena (semifinals), Indianapolis, Indiana (championship); Columbus, Ohio (semifinals)
- Champions: Thomas More Saints (1st title)
- Runner-up: Tufts Jumbos (1st title game)
- Semifinalists: Amherst Lord Jeffs (6th Final Four); Wartburg (1st Final Four)
- Winning coach: Jeff Hans (1st title)
- MOP: Sydney Moss (Thomas More)
- Attendance: 36,186

The 2016 NCAA Division III women's basketball tournament was the 35th annual tournament hosted by the NCAA to determine the national champion of Division III women's collegiate basketball in the United States.

Thomas More defeated Tufts in the championship game, 63–51, to claim the Saints' first Division III national title. While this was the second consecutive tournament win for Thomas More, the Saints' previous title from 2015 was vacated by the NCAA Committee on Infractions and does not count for official records.

The national semifinal rounds were hosted by Capital University at the Capital University Performance Arena in Columbus, Ohio, while the national championship game was held alone at Bankers Life Fieldhouse in Indianapolis, Indiana, also the site of the finals of that year's Division I and Division II tournaments.

== Bracket ==
=== Top left sectional ===
First round March 4, 2016; Regional sites
Thomas More	102
La Roche	67
Crestview Hills, KY
Guilford	62
Mount Union	57
Lynchburg	50
Birmingham–Southern	56
Maryville, TN
Maryville (TN)	67
Mary Washington	56
Hope	72
Carnegie Mellon	73
Holland, MI
Ohio Northern	62
Denison	53
Washington St. Louis	87
Greenville	48
St. Louis, MO
UW Whitewater	66
Bluffton	54

Second round March 5, 2016; Regional sites
Thomas More	92
Guilford	40
Birmingham-Southern	56
Maryville (TN)	63
Carnegie Mellon	68
Ohio Northern	65
Washington St. Louis	62
UW Whitewater	45

Sectional semifinals March 11, 2016; Crestview Hills, KY
Thomas More	75
Maryville (TN)	46
Carnegie Mellon	69
Washington St. Louis	75

Sectional finals March 12, 2016; Crestview Hills, KY
Thomas More	88
Washington St. Louis	72

=== Bottom left sectional ===
First round March 4, 2016; Regional sites
Amherst	65
Eastern Conn. State	47
Amherst, MA
Rowan	93
SUNY New Paltz	75
Stevens Tech	76
SUNY Old Westbury	50
Hoboken, NJ
SUNY Geneseo	51
FDU Florham	45
Bowdoin	75
Westfield State	49
Brunswick, ME
NYU	70
Lehman	63
Rochester (NY)	79
Johnson & Wales	49
Rochester, NY
Stockton	60
Clarkson	59

Second round March 5, 2016; Regional sites
Amherst	78
Rowan	57
Stevens Tech	66
SUNY Geneseo	60
Bowdoin	62
NYU	48
Rochester (NY)	60
Stockton	59

Sectional semifinals March 11, 2016; Amherst, MA
Amherst	82
Stevens Tech	48
Bowdoin	53
Rochester (NY)	60

Sectional finals March 12, 2016; Amherst, MA
Amherst	78
Rochester (NY)	50

=== Top right sectional ===
First round March 4, 2016; Regional sites
Scranton	67
WPI	42
Scranton, PA
Marymount (VA)	60
Cabrini	49
Muhlenberg	81
St. John Fisher	72
Allentown, PA
Saint Joseph's (ME)	47
Christopher Newport	65
Montclair State	55
SUNY Poly	48
Montclair, NJ
Albright	76
Husson	46
Tufts	61
Regis (MA)	49
Biddeford, ME
UNE	60
Moravian	70

Second round March 5, 2016; Regional sites
Scranton	60
Marymount (VA)	44
Muhlenberg	42
Christopher Newport	65
Montclair State	66
Albright	69*
Tufts	65
Moravian	45

Sectional semifinals March 11, 2016; Scranton, PA
Scranton	82
Christopher Newport	46
Albright	49
Tufts	62

Sectional finals March 12, 2016; Scranton, PA
Scranton	48
Tufts	57

=== Bottom right sectional ===
First round March 4, 2016; Regional sites
George Fox	64
St. Norbert	54
Stevens Point, WI
UW Stevens Point	65
DePauw	50
UT Tyler	83
UC Santa Cruz	64
Tyler, TX
Claremont-Mudd-Scripps	63
Trinity (TX)	57
UW Oshkosh	63
UW Superior	53
Oshkosh, WI
Wartburg	65
Wisconsin Lutheran	49
St. Thomas (MN)	76*
Loras	68
River Falls, WI
UW River Falls	81
Wheaton (IL)	56

Second round March 5, 2016; Regional sites
George Fox	62
UW Stevens Point	59
UT Tyler	80
Claremont-Mudd-Scripps	58
UW Oshkosh	56
Wartburg	66
St. Thomas (MN)	67
UW River Falls	46

Sectional semifinals March 11, 2016; St. Paul, MN
George Fox	77
UT Tyler	81*
Wartburg	70
St. Thomas (MN)	66

Sectional finals March 12, 2016; St. Paul, MN
UT Tyler	74
Wartburg	80

=== Final Four ===
Final Four; March 19, 2016; Columbus, OH
Thomas More	74
Amherst	65
Tufts	63
Wartburg	50

National championship April 4, 2016; Indianapolis, IN
Thomas More	63
Tufts	51

== All-tournament team ==
- Hannah Hackley, Amherst
- Sydney Moss, Thomas More
- Abby Owings, Thomas More
- Michela North, Tufts
- Morgan Neuendorf, Wartburg

== See also ==
- 2016 NCAA Division I women's basketball tournament
- 2016 NCAA Division II women's basketball tournament
- 2016 NAIA Division I women's basketball tournament
- 2016 NAIA Division II women's basketball tournament
- 2016 NCAA Division III men's basketball tournament
