= 2018 NCAA Division III women's basketball tournament =

- Teams: 64
- Finals site: Mayo Civic Center, Rochester, Minnesota
- Champions: Amherst Lord Jeffs (3rd title)
- Runner-up: Bowdoin Polar Bears (2nd title game)
- Semifinalists: Thomas More Saints (2nd Final Four); Wartburg Knights (2nd Final Four)
- Winning coach: G.P. Gromacki (2nd title)
- MOP: Emma McCarthy (Amherst)
- Attendance: 43,288

The 2018 NCAA Division III women's basketball tournament was the 37th annual tournament hosted by the NCAA to determine the national champion of Division III women's collegiate basketball in the United States.

Defending champions Amherst defeated Bowdoin in the championship game, 65–45, to claim the Lord Jeffs' third Division III national title.

The championship rounds were hosted at the Mayo Civic Center in Rochester, Minnesota.

== Bracket ==
=== Top left sectional ===
First round March 2, 2018; Regional sites
Amherst	61
Becker	12
Amherst, MA
Saint Joseph's (ME)	61
UMass Boston	56
Montclair State	90
SUNY Old Westbury	69
Montclair, NJ
Gettysburg	74
Albright	65
Rochester (NY)	69
Stevens Tech	57
Rochester, NY
Marymount (VA)	58
MIT	54
RIT	76
UNE	63
Ewing Township, NJ
TCNJ	61
Hilbert	42

Second round March 3, 2018; Regional sites
Amherst	53
St. Joseph's (ME)	47
Montclair State	70
Gettysburg	45
Rochester	53
Marymount	42
RIT	79
TCNJ	76

Sectional semifinals March 9, 2018; Amherst, MA
Amherst	51
Montclair State	40
Rochester	59
RIT	55

Sectional finals March 10, 2018; Amherst, MA
Amherst	62
Rochester	38

=== Bottom left sectional ===
First round March 2, 2018; Regional sites
Hope	75
Cornell College	50
Holland, MI
Washington St. Louis	75
Wheaton (IL)	57
Randolph-Macon	67
Valley Forge	56
Ashland, VA
Christopher Newport	63
Haverford	50
Thomas More	84
Oglethorpe	58
Crestview Hills, KY
Piedmont	52
Juniata	63
Rose–Hulman	52
Gustavus Adolphus	60
Terre Haute, IN
UW Whitewater	81
UW Superior	46

Second round March 3, 2018; Regional sites
Hope	85
Washington St. Louis	69
Randolph-Macon	58
Christopher Newport	84
Thomas More	83
Juniata	50
Gustavus Adolphus	74
UW Whitewater	60

Sectional semifinals March 9, 2018; Holland, MI
Hope	68
Christopher Newport	64
Thomas More	75
Gustavus Adolphus	68

Sectional finals March 10, 2018; Holland, MI
Hope	57
Thomas More	72

=== Top right sectional ===
First round March 2, 2018; Regional sites
Scranton	68
Keuka	48
Scranton, PA
Brooklyn	52
Cabrini	65
Bowdoin	94
Husson	32
Brunswick, ME
FDU Florham	70
Skidmore	66
Messiah	64
Oberlin	54
Grantham, PA
Emory & Henry	66
Roger Williams	55
Ithaca	54
SUNY Geneseo	47
Ithaca, NY
Tufts	71
Westfield State	54

Second round March 3, 2018; Regional sites
Scranton	55
Cabrini	46
Bowdoin	79
FDU Florham	57
Messiah	62
Emory & Henry	49
Ithaca	39
Tufts	61

Sectional semifinals March 9, 2018; Scranton, PA
Scranton	54
Bowdoin	66
Messiah	39
Tufts	70

Sectional finals March 10, 2018; Scranton, PA
Bowdoin	66
Tufts	48

=== Bottom right sectional ===
First round March 2, 2018; Regional sites
Wartburg	86
Webster	45
Waverly, IA
George Fox	79
Saint Benedict	63
Illinois Wesleyan	83
Marietta	77
Bloomington, IL
DePauw	50
Trine	65
UT Dallas	79
Trinity (TX)	70
Richardson, TX
East Texas Baptist	65
Whitman	59
Chicago	70
Wisconsin Lutheran	46
St. Paul, MN
St. Thomas (MN)	81
Chapman	51

Second round March 3, 2018; Regional sites
Wartburg	82
George Fox	58
Illinois Wesleyan	70
Trine	79
UT Dallas	51
East Texas Baptist	64
Chicago	62
St. Thomas (MN)	68

Sectional semifinals March 9, 2018; Waverly, IA
Wartburg	78
Trine	54
East Texas Baptist	61*
St. Thomas (MN)	58

Sectional finals March 10, 2018; Waverly, IA
Wartburg	65
East Texas Baptist	61

=== Final Four ===
Final Four; March 16, 2018; Mayo Civic Center; Rochester, MN
Amherst	66
Thomas More	48
Bowdoin	90
Wartburg	62

National championship March 17, 2018; Mayo Civic Center; Rochester, MN
Amherst	65
Bowdoin	45

== All-tournament team ==
- Hannah Fox, Amherst
- Emma McCarthy, Amherst
- Kate Kerrigan, Bowdoin
- Madison Temple, Thomas More
- Katie Sommer, Wartburg

== See also ==
- 2018 NCAA Division I women's basketball tournament
- 2018 NCAA Division II women's basketball tournament
- 2018 NAIA Division I women's basketball tournament
- 2018 NAIA Division II women's basketball tournament
- 2018 NCAA Division III men's basketball tournament
