= 2022 NCAA Division III women's basketball tournament =

- Teams: 64
- Finals site: UPMC Cooper Fieldhouse, Pittsburgh, Pennsylvania
- Champions: Hope Flying Dutch (3rd title)
- Runner-up: Wisconsin–Whitewater Warhawks (2nd title game)
- Semifinalists: Trine Thunder (1st Final Four); Amherst Mammoths (9th Final Four)
- Winning coach: Brian Morehouse (2nd title)
- MOP: Sydney Muller (Hope)

The 2022 NCAA Division III women's basketball tournament was the tournament hosted by the NCAA to determine the national champion of Division III women's collegiate basketball in the United States for the 2021–22 NCAA Division III women's basketball season.

The championship rounds were played at the UPMC Cooper Fieldhouse in Pittsburgh, March 17–19, 2022. The final game had Hope beating Whitewater 71–58.

This was the first tournament since 2019, as the two previous editions in 2020 and 2021 were both canceled due to the COVID-19 pandemic.

== Qualifying ==
=== Automatic bids (44) ===
Automatic bids
Conference	Qualifying school	Record
AMCC	La Roche	20–5
American Rivers	Simpson	25–1
American Southwest	Hardin-Simmons	21–4
Atlantic East	Immaculata	18–8
Centennial	Gettysburg	24–3
CUNYAC	Brooklyn	21–3
Coast to Coast	Christopher Newport	24–0
CCIW	Illinois Wesleyan	19–8
CSAC	Clarks Summit	23–4
Commonwealth Coast	Roger Williams	25–2
Empire 8	St. John Fisher	25–2
Great Northeast	Emmanuel (MA)	25–1
HCAC	Transylvania	24–0
Landmark	Scranton	25–2
Liberty	Ithaca	24–3
Little East	Rhode Island College	23–5
MASCAC	Framingham State	22–3
Michigan	Hope	26–1
MAC Commonwealth	Messiah	23–3
MAC Freedom	DeSales	23–3
Midwest	Ripon	18–9
Minnesota	Gustavus Adolphus	22–4
NECC	Mitchell	12–13
NESCAC	Bates	17–7
NEWMAC	Smith	23–2
New Jersey	New Jersey City	13–9
North Atlantic	SUNY Poly	20–6
North Coast	Wittenberg	18–7
NACC	Wisconsin Lutheran	23–1
Northwest	Whitman	26–1
Ohio	Baldwin Wallace	21–4
Old Dominion	Shenandoah	22–5
Presidents'	Washington & Jefferson	23–4
St. Louis	Webster	25–0
Skyline	Mount Saint Mary	23–3
SAA	Rhodes	23–2
SCIAC	Whittier	16–8
SCAC	Trinity (TX)	25–2
SUNYAC	SUNY New Paltz	20–6
United East	SUNY Morrisville	19–7
University Athletic	NYU	22–1
Upper Midwest	North Central (MN)	24–4
USA South	Southern Virginia	24–4
Wisconsin	Wisconsin–Eau Claire	21–7

=== At-large bids (20) ===
At-large bids
Qualifying school	Conference	Record
Amherst	NESCAC	21–3
Babson	NEWMAC	19–7
CUA	Landmark	20–5
DePauw	North Coast	23–3
East Texas Baptist	American Southwest	20–5
Elizabethtown	Landmark	20–5
John Carroll	Ohio	22–4
Johns Hopkins	Centennial	22–4
Marietta	Ohio	21–5
Mary Hardin-Baylor	American Southwest	22–4
Millikin	CCIW	21–6
Salisbury	Coast-to-Coast	20–6
Springfield	NEWMAC	22–4
SUNY Cortland	SUNYAC	21–5
Trine	Michigan	24–3
Tufts	NESCAC	20–4
Wartburg	American Rivers	21–5
Washington and Lee	Old Dominion	20–6
Wisconsin–Oshkosh	Wisconsin	19–6
Wisconsin–Whitewater	Wisconsin	23–4

== Sectionals ==
=== Amherst Sectional ===
First round March 4 Campus sites
Christopher Newport	89
Mitchell	42
Baltimore, MD
Johns Hopkins	54
Mount Saint Mary	57
Hardin-Simmons	57
Trinity (TX)	61
Abilene, Texas
Whitman	62
Whittier	57
Tufts	84
Clarks Summit	54
Medford, MA
DeSales	78
SUNY Cortland	52
St. John Fisher	55
Rhode Island College	52
Amherst, MA
Amherst	60
SUNY Poly	42

Second round March 5 Campus sites
Christopher Newport	107
Mount St. Mary	52
Trinity (TX)	52
Whitman	39
Tufts	58
DeSales	47
St. John Fisher	48
Amherst	56

Sectional Semifinals; March 11; Amherst, MA
Christopher Newport	71
Trinity (TX)	76
Tufts	45
Amherst	48

Sectional Finals; March 12; Amherst, MA
Trinity (TX)	61
Amherst	79

=== Whitewater Sectional ===
First round March 4 Campus sites
Smith	61
Framingham State	51
Northampton, MA
Emmanuel (MA)	57
Brooklyn	70
DePauw	55
Illinois Wesleyan	56
Whitewater, WI
Wisconsin–Whitewater	58
Ripon	34
Gettysburg	77
SUNY Morrisville	44
Gettysburg, PA
Baldwin Wallace	66
Salisbury	54
Wisconsin–Oshkosh	48
Wisconsin Lutheran	42
Indianola, IA
Simpson	73
Gustavus Adolphus	67

Second round March 5 Campus sites
Smith	76
Brooklyn	58
Illinois Wesleyan	54
Wisconsin–Whitewater	72
Gettysburg	55
Baldwin Wallace	66
Wisconsin–Oshkosh	64
Simpson	56

Sectional Semifinals; March 11; Whitewater, WI
Smith	76
Wisconsin–Whitewater	78
Baldwin Wallace	63
Wisconsin–Oshkosh	74

Sectional Finals; March 12; Whitewater, WI
Wisconsin-Whitewater	68
Wisconsin-Oshkosh	62

=== Holland Sectional ===
First round March 4 Campus sites
Hope	86
La Roche	54
Holland, MI
Marietta	65
Wittenberg	50
Millikin	81
Wartburg	68
Eau Claire, WI
Wisconsin–Eau Claire	61
North Central (MN)	46
NYU	71
Washington & Lee	61
New York, NY
Roger Williams	64
Bates	68
SUNY New Paltz	66
Babson	79
Scranton, PA
Scranton	69
New Jersey City	47

Second round March 5 Campus sites
Hope	85
Marietta	66
Millikin	59
Wisconsin–Eau Claire	56
NYU	42
Bates	26
Babson	53
Scranton	65

Sectional Semifinals; March 11; Holland, MI
Hope	91
Millikin	77
NYU	73
Scranton	54

Sectional Finals; March 12; Holland, MI'
Hope	83
NYU	64

=== Lexington Sectional ===
First round March 4 Campus sites
Ithaca	75
Catholic	63
Ithaca, NY
Messiah	68
Springfield	73
John Carroll	100
Elizabethtown	56
Angola, IN
Trine	62
Immaculata	37
Mary Hardin-Baylor	79
Webster	76
Memphis, TN
East Texas Baptist	65
Rhodes	53
Southern Virginia	68
Shenandoah	49
Lexington, KY
Transylvania	69
Washington & Jefferson	52

Second round March 5 Campus sites
Ithaca	71
Springfield	73*
John Carroll	42
Trine	63
Mary Hardin-Baylor	75
East Texas Baptist	57
Southern Virginia	55
Transylvania	77

Sectional Semifinals; March 11; Lexington, KY
Springfield	49
Trine	58
Mary Hardin-Baylor	58
Transylvania	63

Sectional Finals; March 12; Lexington, KY
Trine	55
Transylvania	47

== Final Four ==
National semifinals March 17; Pittsburgh, PA
Amherst	51
Wisconsin–Whitewater	55
Hope	57
Trine	52

National championship March 19; Pittsburgh, PA
Wisconsin-Whitewater	58
Hope	71

== See also ==
- 2022 NCAA Division I women's basketball tournament
- 2022 NCAA Division II women's basketball tournament
- 2022 NAIA women's basketball tournament
- 2022 NCAA Division III men's basketball tournament
