= Wartburg Knights women's basketball =

- Head coach: Bob Amsberry (18th season)
- Location: Waverly, Iowa
- Arena: Levick Arena (capacity: 2,000)
- Conference: ARC
- Nickname: Knights
- Colors: Orange and Black

NCAA Division I tournament Final Four
- 2016, 2018, 2024
Other NCAA Division I tournament results
Elite Eight	1992, 1993, 2001, 2016, 2018, 2019, 2024
Sweet Sixteen	1990, 1992, 1993, 2001, 2016, 2018, 2023, 2024
Appearances	1989, 1990, 1991, 1992, 1993, 1994, 1999, 2001, 2002, 2016, 2017, 2018, 2019, 2020, 2022, 2023, 2024, 2025

Conference tournament champions
- 2001, 2002, 2017, 2018, 2019, 2020, 2024, 2025

Conference regular-season champions
- 1990, 1992, 2001, 2002, 2003, 2017, 2018, 2019, 2020, 2023, 2024, 2025, 2026

Uniforms
Home	Away	Alternate

The Wartburg Knights women's basketball team represents the Wartburg College in Waverly, Iowa, United States. The team is a member of the American Rivers Conference as well as the National Collegiate Athletic Association. The team plays its regular season games in Levick Arena, along with men's basketball, wrestling, and volleyball teams.

== History ==
Wartburg women's basketball began in 1974, under head coach Doug Johnson. The first Wartburg team finished 12–3 in 1974–75, its first victory coming against the Northern Iowa Panthers. Johnson coached only one season at Wartburg, which marked first winning season. Since Johnson Wartburg has had a total of 7 head coaches, the majority of the seasons coached by Monica Severson and current head coach Bob Amsberry.

The 2015–16 season Wartburg broke through to their first final four in school history. The unranked Knights got an at-large bid to the NCAA tournament for the first time since 2002. They would beat 3 ranked teams on their way to a regional championship and finish the season 23–8. Since that year the Knights have made it to 8 straight NCAA tournaments and two other appearances in the NCAA Final Four in 2018 and 2024.

== NCAA tournament results ==
Wartburg has appeared in 17 NCAA Tournaments with a record of 26–17.

Year	Rank	Round	Opponent	Result
1989		First Round	Augustana (Ill)	L 74−93
1990		First Round; Sweet Sixteen	Augustana (Ill); Buena Vista	W 72–57; L 63−78
1991		First Round	Luther	L 54−78
1992		First Round; Sweet Sixteen; Elite Eight	UW-Stout; St. Benedict (MN); Luther	W 90–72; W 74–64; L 61–70
1993		First Round; Sweet Sixteen; Elite Eight	Wash U (MO); UW-Whitewater; Central (IA)	W 75–60; W 83–77; L 60–62
1994		First Round	Aurora (IL)	L 57–61
1999		First Round	St Thomas	L 41–67
2001	13	First Round; Second Round; Sweet Sixteen; Elite Eight	Chapman; Nebraska Wesleyan; Fontbonne; Wash U (MO)	W 86–78; W 85–71; W 82–78; L 71–83
2002		First Round	Carleton	L 61–71
2016		First Round; Second Round; Sweet Sixteen; Elite Eight; Final Four	Wisconsin Lutheran #11 UW-Oshkosh #8 St. Thomas #5 Texas Tyler #7 Tufts	W 65–49; W 66–56; W 70–66; W 80–74; L 50–63
2017	9	First Round	Chicago	L 63–67
2018	2	First Round; Second Round; Sweet Sixteen; Elite Eight; Final Four	Webster #12 George Fox #7 Trine; East Texas Baptist #5 Bowdoin	W 86–45; W 82–58; W 78–54; W 65–61; L 62–90
2019	11	First Round; Second Round; Sweet Sixteen; Elite Eight	Bethany Lutheran #9 Hope #13 UW-Oshkosh #2 St. Thomas (MN)	W 91–63; W 76–49; W 70–57; L 56–85
2020	5	First Round; Second Round	Monmouth #11 Whitman	W 91–55; L 63–67
2022		First Round	Millikin	L 68–81
2023	24	First Round; Second Round; Sweet Sixteen	#13 Baldwin Wallace #6 Hope #1 Christopher Newport	W 57–43; W 81–67; L 51–60
2024	6	First Round; Second Round; Sweet Sixteen; Elite Eight; Final Four	Wisconsin Lutheran #16 Illinois Wesleyan; Bates #9 Washington and Lee #14 Smith	W 72–65; W 62–59; W 54–53; W 68–58; L 54-61 OT
2025	8	First Round; Second Round	Wisconsin–Stevens Point #5 Gustavus Adolphus	W 57–56; L 50–56

== Head coaching records ==
Record table
Season	Coach	Overall	Conference	Standing	Postseason
Wartburg Knights (no conference games) (1975–1982)
1974–1975	Doug Johnson	12-3			
Doug Johnson:		12-3			
1975–1976	Marge Schaffer	11-11			
Marge Schaffer:		11-11			
1976–1977	Cheryl Wren	14-8			
1977–1978	Cheryl Wren	15-6			
Cheryl Wren:		29-14			
1978–1979	Nancy Schley	14-8			
1979–1980	Nancy Schley	9-16			
1980–1981	Nancy Schley	9-17			
Nancy Schley:		32-41			
1981–1982	Kathy Meyer Thomas	9-14			
Wartburg Knights (Iowa Intercollegiate Athletic Conference) (1982–2018)
1982–1983	Kathy Meyer Thomas	7-14	1-5		
1983–1984	Kathy Meyer Thomas	14-10	8-6		
1984–1985	Kathy Meyer Thomas	9-14	6-8		
1985–1986	Kathy Meyer Thomas	6-18	4-10		
1986–1987	Kathy Meyer Thomas	6-18	3-14		
1987–1988	Kathy Meyer Thomas	13-12	9-7		
Kathy Meyer Thomas:		64-86	31-50		
1988–1989	Monica Severson	21-6	13-4	2nd	NCAA First Round
1989–1990	Monica Severson	22-5	14-2	1st	NCAA Sweet Sixteen
1990–1991	Monica Severson	20-7	13-3	2nd	NCAA First Round
1991–1992	Monica Severson	23-4	17-0	1st	NCAA Elite Eight
1992–1993	Monica Severson	23-5	13-3	2nd	NCAA Elite Eight
1993–1994	Monica Severson	20-6	14-2	2nd	NCAA First Round
1994–1995	Monica Severson	11-12	7-9	5th	
1995–1996	Monica Severson	17–7	11-5	3rd	
1996–1997	Monica Severson	16-8	12-4	3rd	
1997–1998	Monica Severson	17–8	15-5	3rd	
1998–1999	Monica Severson	20-5	17-3	2nd	NCAA First Round
1999–2000	Monica Severson	17-8	14-6	2nd	
2000–2001	Monica Severson	26-5	18-2	1st	NCAA Elite Eight
2001–2002	Monica Severson	21–7	14-4	1st	NCAA First Round
2002–2003	Monica Severson	19–8	14-4	3rd	
2003–2004	Monica Severson	19-9	11-5	3rd	
2004–2005	Monica Severson	16-11	9-7	4th	
2005–2006	Monica Severson Kathy Franken	7-17	4-12	8th	
Monica Severson:		335-131	233-80		
2006–2007	Bob Amsberry	13-13	8-8	6th	
2007–2008	Bob Amsberry	13-11	6-10	7th	
2008–2009	Bob Amsberry	16-11	10-6	2nd	
2009–2010	Bob Amsberry	18-8	12-4	3rd	
2010–2011	Bob Amsberry	21-5	12-4	3rd	
2011–2012	Bob Amsberry	18-9	10-6	T-3rd	
2012–2013	Bob Amsberry	16-10	9-5	2nd	
2013–2014	Bob Amsberry	12-15	5-9	T–5th	
2014–2015	Bob Amsberry	17-11	6-8	T-5th	
2015–2016	Bob Amsberry	23-8	9-5	3rd	NCAA Final Four
2016–2017	Bob Amsberry	25-3	15-1	1st	NCAA First Round
2017–2018	Bob Amsberry	31-1	16-0	1st	NCAA Final Four
Wartburg Knights (American Rivers Conference) (2018–Present)
2018-2019	Bob Amsberry	27-4	15-1	1st	NCAA Elite Eight
2019-2020	Bob Amsberry	25-4	14-2	1st	NCAA Second Round
2020-2021	Bob Amsberry	13-3	6-2	T-2nd	Postseason not held; COVID-19
2021-2022	Bob Amsberry	21-6	13-3	2nd	NCAA First Round
2022–2023	Bob Amsberry	23-7	15-1	1st	NCAA Sweet Sixteen
2023–2024	Bob Amsberry	29-3	16-0	1st	NCAA Final Four
2024–2025	Bob Amsberry	26-3	16-0	1st	NCAA Second Round
2025–2026	Bob Amsberry	20-7	15-1	1st	
Bob Amsberry:		407–142	218-76		
Total:		900-434			
National champion Postseason invitational champion Conference regular season champion Conference regular season and conference tournament champion Division regular season champion Division regular season and conference tournament champion Conference tournament champion

== Current coaching staff ==
- Head coach: Bob Amsberry
- Assistant coach: Kelli Jacobs
- Assistant coach: Justin Little
- Athletic trainer: Jessica Albright

== Head coaching history ==
As of the completion of 2025 season

Tenure	Coach	Years	Record	Pct.
1974-1975	Doug Johnson	1	12–3–0	.800
1975–1976	Marge Schaffer	1	11–11–0	.500
1976–1978	Cheryl Wren	2	29-14-0	.674
1978-1981	Nancy Schley	3	32–41–0	.438
1981-1988	Kathy Meyer Thomas	7	64–86–0	.427
1988-2006	Monica Severson	18	335–131–0	.719
2006	Kathy Franken	1†	1–7–0	.125
2006–present	Bob Amsberry	18	387–135–0	.741
Totals	7 coaches	51 seasons	880-427–0	.673

† Kathy Franken served as the interim head coach for the end of the 2005–2006 season following the departure of Monica Severson.

== Individual awards ==
=== National Awards ===
National Awards
Year	Player	Type
2025-26	Katie Boulanger	DIII Rookie of the Year

=== Conference Awards ===
Conference Awards
Year	Player	Type
1989-90	Kathy Smith	Most Valuable Player
1991-92	Kathy Roberts	Most Valuable Player
2000-01	Holly Mohs	Most Valuable Player
2000-02	Holly Mohs	Most Valuable Player
2010-11	Samantha Harrington	Most Valuable Player
2011-12	Leslie Wilson	Defensive Player of the Year
2016-17	Katie Sommer	Most Valuable Player
2017-18	Katie Sommer	Most Valuable Player
2018-19	Emma Gerdes	Most Valuable Player
2019-20	Emma Gerdes	Most Valuable Player
2022-23	Sara Faber	Most Valuable Player
2023-24	Jaedon Murphy	Most Valuable Player
2024-25	Sara Faber	Defensive Player of the Year
2025-26	Katie Boulanger	Rookie of the Year
