= 2023 NCAA Division III women's basketball tournament =

- Teams: 64
- Finals site: Oosting Gymnasium (semifinals); American Airlines Center (final), Hartford, Connecticut (semifinals); Dallas, Texas (final)
- Champions: Transylvania (1st title)
- Runner-up: Christopher Newport (1st title game)
- Semifinalists: Smith (1st Final Four); Rhode Island College (1st Final Four)
- Winning coach: Juli Fulks (1st title)
- MOP: Maddie Kellione (Transylvania)

The 2023 NCAA Division III women's basketball tournament was the tournament hosted by the NCAA to determine the national champion of Division III women's college basketball in the United States for the 2022–23 season. It featured 64 teams.

During the 2022–23 academic year, the NCAA organized many events to celebrate the 50th anniversary of the enactment of Title IX, federal legislation outlawing sex discrimination in higher education. As part of this celebration, the NCAA scheduled the women's basketball championship games of all three of its divisions at the site of the 2023 Division I Final Four. Accordingly, the championship game was held on April 1, 2023, at the American Airlines Center in Dallas. The national semifinals were played at Oosting Gymnasium at Trinity College in Hartford, Connecticut on March 18.

This scheduling also created an unusually long break in the tournament. Normally, the national championship game is played one or two days after the semifinals, but this year's final took place 14 days after the semifinals.

== Tournament schedule and venues ==
2023 NCAA Division III Women's Tournament sites

=== Regionals ===
The first and second rounds took place at campus sites from March 3–4, 2023. Teams were sent to one of 16 locations, each hosted by one team from the group of four.

The third and fourth rounds (sectional semifinals and finals) also took place at campus sites from March 10–11, 2023. Teams were sent to the home arena of one of the four teams remaining in their sectional bracket.

=== Final Four ===
The national semifinals and finals were held at predetermined sites: the former at the Oosting Gymnasium at Trinity College in Hartford, Connecticut, on March 18, and the latter at the American Airlines Center in Dallas.

The national championship was played on April 1, 2023, in Dallas, which was also the host of the 2023 NCAA Division I women's basketball tournament Final Four.

== Qualifying ==
A total of sixty-four bids were available for the tournament: Forty-four automatic bids—awarded to the champions of the 44 NCAA-recognized Division III conference tournaments—and 20 at-large bids.

While this is the first season for the newly established Collegiate Conference of the South, its conference tournament champion will not be eligible for an automatic bid until 2024.

This was also the final year that the Colonial States Athletic Conference and United East Conference receive separate bids; the two conferences will merge ahead of the 2023–24 season, consolidating their bids into one, although the name and legacy of the combined conference have not yet been announced. It was also the final year for the New England Collegiate Conference as an all-sports league. After steady losses of membership in recent years, it had only four members in the 2022–23 season. All four would join other conferences for 2023–24 and beyond.

=== Automatic bids (44) ===
Automatic bids
Conference	Qualifying school	Record
AMCC	La Roche	20–7
American Rivers	Loras	23–4
American Southwest	UT Dallas	19–9
Atlantic East	Marymount (VA)	23–4
Centennial	Gettysburg	20–6
CUNYAC	Brooklyn	19–7
Coast to Coast	Christopher Newport	26–0
CCIW	Millikin	23–4
CSAC	Notre Dame (MD)	23–4
Commonwealth Coast	Roger Williams	25–3
Empire 8	St. John Fisher	25–2
Great Northeast	Saint Joseph's (ME)	23–5
HCAC	Transylvania	27–0
Landmark	Scranton	27–0
Liberty	Skidmore	22–5
Little East	Rhode Island College	24–3
MASCAC	Bridgewater State	21–6
Michigan	Hope	25–2
MAC Commonwealth	Messiah	25–2
MAC Freedom	DeSales	26–1
Midwest	Knox	22–5
Minnesota	Gustavus Adolphus	25–2
NECC	Mitchell	18–9
NESCAC	Tufts	21–6
NEWMAC	Smith	26–1
New Jersey	Rowan	20–8
North Atlantic	Maine Maritime	22–6
North Coast	Ohio Wesleyan	18–10
NACC	St. Norbert	24–3
Northwest	Whitman	21–5
Ohio	Ohio Northern	23–4
Old Dominion	Washington and Lee	22–6
Presidents'	Saint Vincent	22–4
St. Louis	Webster	24–3
Skyline	Merchant Marine	24–2
SAA	Rhodes	17–11
SCIAC	Redlands	19–7
SCAC	Trinity (TX)	26–1
SUNYAC	SUNY Cortland	23–4
United East	SUNY Morrisville	20–7
University Athletic	NYU	22–2
Upper Midwest	Northwestern St. Paul	19–8
USA South	Greensboro	26–2
Wisconsin	Wisconsin–Whitewater	21–6

=== At-large bids (20) ===
At-large Bids
Qualifying school	Record	Conference
Babson	23–5	NEWMAC
Baldwin Wallace	22–5	OAC
Berea	26–2	CCS
Chicago	21–4	UAA
Eastern Connecticut State	22–5	Little East
Elizabethtown	22–4	Landmark
Emory	17–7	UAA
Hardin-Simmons	23–3	ASC
Ithaca	23–4	Liberty
Johns Hopkins	21–6	Centennial
Marietta	20–7	OAC
Mary Washington	22–6	Coast to Coast
Stevens Tech	22–5	MAC Freedom
SUNY New Paltz	23–4	SUNYAC
Trine	21–6	MIAA
Trinity (CT)	21–6	NESCAC
Wartburg	21–6	American Rivers
Washington St. Louis	17–8	UAA
Wisconsin–Eau Claire	20–8	WIAC
Wisconsin–Oshkosh	19–8	WIAC

== Brackets ==
=== Upper Left ===
First Round; March 3–4, 2023; Campus sites
Smith	100
SUNY Morrisville	50
Northampton, MA
Marymount	72
St. John Fisher	80
Mary Washington	69
Roger Williams	60
Center Valley, PA
DeSales	78
Mitchell	60
Trinity (CT)	58
Notre Dame (MD)	43
Hartford, CT
SUNY Cortland	62
Saint Vincent	51
Ohio Wesleyan	68
Gustavus Adolphus	84
Whitewater, WI
Wisconsin–Whitewater	69
Webster	50

Second Round; March 3–4, 2023; Campus sites
Smith	65
St. John Fisher	64
Mary Washington	75
DeSales	69
Trinity (CT)	64
SUNY Cortland	59
Gustavus Adolphus	63
Wisconsin–Whitewater	68

Sectional Semifinals; March 10, 2023; Northampton, MA
Smith	68
Mary Washington	65
Trinity (CT)	63
Wisconsin–Whitewater	56

Sectional Finals; March 11, 2023; Northampton, MA
Smith	63
Trinity (CT)	46

=== Bottom Left ===
First Round; March 3–4, 2023; Campus sites
Transylvania	58
Rhodes	45
Lexington, KY
Emory	70
Millikin	76
Wisconsin–Oshkosh	58
Washington and Lee	55
Ada, OH
Ohio Northern	54
Berea	43
Loras	68
Knox	56
Dubuque, IA
Washington St. Louis	69
Trine	79
Messiah	47
Bridgewater State	43
Mechanicsburg, PA
NYU	71
Greensboro	54

Second Round; March 3–4, 2023; Campus sites
Transylvania	71
Millikin	59
Wisconsin–Oshkosh	60
Ohio Northern	71
Loras	54
Trine	60
Messiah	39
NYU	62

Sectional Semifinals; March 10, 2023; Lexington, KY
Transylvania	67
Ohio Northern	43
Trine	49
NYU	66

Sectional Finals; March 11, 2023; Lexington, KY
Transylvania	79
NYU	63

=== Upper Right ===
First Round; March 3–4, 2023; Campus sites
Christopher Newport	89
Brooklyn	52
Newport News, VA
Elizabethtown	79
Stevens Tech	68
Baldwin Wallace	43
Wartburg	57
Holland, MI
Hope	82
St. Norbert	61
Trinity (TX)	79
UT Dallas	62
San Antonio, TX
Hardin-Simmons	77
Redlands	60
Skidmore	62
Johns Hopkins	59
Medford, MA
Tufts	72
Merchant Marine	57

Second Round; March 3–4, 2023; Campus sites
Christopher Newport	65
Elizabethtown	55
Wartburg	81
Hope	67
Trinity (TX)	88
Hardin–Simmons	69
Skidmore	50
Tufts	59

Sectional Semifinals; March 10, 2023; Medford, MA
Christopher Newport	60
Wartburg	51
Trinity (TX)	52
Tufts	65

Sectional Finals; March 11, 2023; Medford, MA
Christopher Newport	72
Tufts	56

=== Bottom Right ===
First Round; March 3–4, 2023; Campus sites
Babson	69
Maine Maritime	44
Wellesley, MA
Gettysburg	47
SUNY New Paltz	63
Marietta	61
Eastern Connecticut State	57
Ithaca, NY
Ithaca	58
La Roche	42
Chicago	63
Northwestern St. Paul	48
Chicago, IL
Wisconsin–Eau Claire	81
Whitman	85
Rhode Island College	67
Rowan	59
Scranton, PA
Scranton	64
Saint Joseph's (ME)	45

Second Round; March 3–4, 2023; Campus sites
Babson	76
SUNY New Paltz	66
Marietta	44
Ithaca	42
Chicago	56
Whitman	54
Rhode Island College	62
Scranton	55

Sectional Semifinals; March 10, 2023; Wellesley, MA
Babson	73
Marietta	59
Chicago	56
Rhode Island College	64

Sectional Finals; March 11, 2023; Wellesley, MA
Babson	47
Rhode Island College	60

=== Final Four ===
National semifinal March 18; Hartford, CT
Smith College	65
Transylvania	76
Christopher Newport	56
Rhode Island College	51

National championship April 1 Dallas, TX
Transylvania	57
Christopher Newport	52

=== Sectional hosting controversy ===
When sectional hosts were announced on March 5, there was some controversy as three of the four hosts were placed in the state of Massachusetts and all four in the Eastern Time Zone. Most of the controversy came when Tufts, with its 21–6 regular season record, was granted hosting rights over 26–1 Trinity (TX), with top seed Christopher Newport unable to host due to the men's sectional being held at CNU the same weekend. Three teams would have to travel via air regardless of where the pod was placed, an unusual occurrence for a Division III sectional. D3sports.com's Pat Coleman observed "[Division III] Texas teams get screwed so often [by the NCAA], in every sport. This was a chance for a makeup call that was sorely missed, and it's an example Texas teams can point to and say, even when the number of flights is equal, we still get screwed." Further analysis by Coleman showed a long-standing NCAA policy to deny sectional hosts in Texas or the larger Region 10 (which also includes the states of Colorado, California, Oregon, and Washington). Since the sectional concept was introduced to the men's and women's tournaments in 2000, there had been 84 sectionals in each tournament through the 2023 editions. On the women's side, no Region 10 school had hosted a sectional since 2014, and the previous Region 10 host had done so in 2008, meaning that only one of the past 56 sectionals had been held in Region 10. The perceived snubbing of Region 10 was even greater in the men's tournament; only one sectional had been held in Region 10, with none since 2004.

== See also ==
- 2023 NCAA Division I women's basketball tournament
- 2023 NCAA Division II women's basketball tournament
- 2023 NAIA women's basketball tournament
- 2023 NCAA Division III men's basketball tournament
