= 2024 NCAA Division III women's basketball tournament =

American college basketball tournament

- Teams: 64
- Finals site: Capital University Performance Arena, Columbus, Ohio
- Champions: NYU Violets (2nd title)
- Runner-up: Smith Pioneers (1st title game)
- Semifinalists: Transylvania Pioneers (2nd Final Four); Wartburg Knights (3rd Final Four)
- Winning coach: Meg Barber (1st title)
- MOP: Natalie Bruns (NYU)

The 2024 NCAA Division III women's basketball tournament was the tournament hosted by the NCAA to determine the national champion of Division III women's college basketball among its member programs in the United States, culminating the 2023–24 season. It again featured a field of 64 teams.

The first four rounds were played on campus sites, and the national semifinals and finals were held at the Capital University Performance Arena at Capital University in Columbus, Ohio from March 14–16, 2024.

NYU defeated Smith in the final, 51–41, to win the Violets' second national title.

== Tournament schedule and venues ==
2023 NCAA Division III Women's Tournament sites

=== Regionals ===
The first and second rounds took place on campus sites from March 1–2, 2024. Teams were sent to one of sixteen host campus sites, which all corresponded to the home arena of one of the four teams in each grouping of four teams.

The third and fourth rounds (the sectional semifinals and finals), also took place on campus sites from March 8–19, 2024. Teams were sent to the home arena of one of the four remaining teams in their sectional bracket.

=== Final Four ===
The national semifinals and finals were held at a predetermined site, the Capital University Performance Arena at Capital University in Columbus, Ohio. The national semifinals were played on March 14, and the final was played on March 16.

== Qualifying ==
A total of sixty-four bids were available for the tournament: Forty-two (42) automatic bids—awarded to the champions of the forty-two NCAA Division III conferences guaranteed a spot in the tournament and twenty (20) at-large bids to the highest rated programs that failed to win their respective leagues. The number of automatic bids decreased by two this year following the dissolution of the New England Collegiate Conference as an all-sports conference and the merger of the United East Conference and the Colonial States Athletic Conference (the UEC retained the auto bid).

While this is the second season for the Collegiate Conference of the South, its conference tournament champion will not be eligible for an automatic bid until 2025.

== Tournament bracket ==
=== Top left sectional ===
First round March 1, 2024
NYU	78
Millsaps	51
Allentown, PA
DeSales	53
Southern Virginia	42
Mary Hardin-Baylor	71
Trinity (TX)	75
Abilene, TX
Hardin–Simmons	65
Occidental	53
Scranton	60
Framingham State	39
Scranton, PA
Marymount (VA)	38
Ohio Northern	62
Johns Hopkins	75
Marietta	66
Newport News, VA
Christopher Newport	104
Mount Saint Vincent	52

Second round March 2, 2024
NYU	93
DeSales	59
Trinity (TX)	62
Hardin–Simmons	84
Scranton	60
Ohio Northern	54
Johns Hopkins	77
Christopher Newport	75

Sectional semifinals March 8, 2024; New York, NY
NYU	73
Hardin–Simmons	55
Scranton	65
Johns Hopkins	53

Sectional finals March 9, 2024; New York, NY
NYU	68
Scranton	46

=== Bottom left sectional ===
First round March 1, 2024
Wisconsin–Whitewater	86
Minnesota–Morris	47
Whitewater, WI
Millikin	91
Willamette	83
Hope	65
Ripon	54
Greencastle, IN
DePauw	74
Berea	52
Carroll (WI)	65
Puget Sound	74
Waukesha, WI
Washington St. Louis	61
Wisconsin–Stout	71
Emory	54
Ohio Wesleyan	64
Lexington, KY
Transylvania	61
Chatham	40

Second round March 2, 2024
Wisconsin–Whitewater	89
Millikin	65
Hope	70
DePauw	55
Puget Sound	40
Wisconsin–Stout	61
Ohio Wesleyan	55
Transylvania	70

Sectional semifinals March 8, 2024; Whitewater, WI
Wisconsin–Whitewater	72
Hope	61
Wisconsin–Stout	58
Transylvania	63

Sectional finals March 9, 2024; Whitewater, WI
Wisconsin–Whitewater	48
Transylvania	62

=== Top right sectional ===
First round March 1, 2024
Bowdoin	69
Western New England	48
Brunswick, ME
UMass Dartmouth	78
New Jersey City	69
Trinity (CT)	54
Baldwin Wallace	59
New Paltz, NY
New Paltz	70
Penn State Harrisburg	52
Wisconsin–Oshkosh	57
Webster	42
Oshkosh, WI
Gustavus Adolphus	58
Trine	61
Shenandoah	57
Messiah	58
Northampton, MA
Smith	61
Maine Maritime	46

Second round March 2, 2024
Bowdoin	67
UMass Dartmouth	59
Baldwin Wallace	65
New Paltz	42
Wisconsin–Oshkosh	74
Trine	48
Messiah	61
Smith	69

Sectional semifinals March 8, 2024; Brunswick, ME
Bowdoin	78
Baldwin Wallace	48
Wisconsin–Oshkosh	59
Smith	61

Sectional finals March 9, 2024; Brunswick, ME
Bowdoin	47
Smith	52

=== Bottom right sectional ===
First round March 1, 2024
Bates	66
Brooklyn	51
Lewiston, ME
Springfield	50
Widener	57
Illinois Wesleyan	75
Concordia Moorhead	62
Waverly, IA
Wartburg	72
Wisconsin Lutheran	65
Washington and Lee	68
Vassar	61
Lexington, VA
Catholic	71
Penn State Behrend	55
Gettysburg	46
St. John Fisher	55
Providence, RI
Rhode Island College	56
St. Joseph's (ME)	37

Second round March 2, 2024
Bates	79
Widener	66
Illinois Wesleyan	59
Wartburg	62
Washington and Lee	80
Catholic	70
St. John Fisher	43
Rhode Island College	66

Sectional semifinals March 8, 2024; Providence, RI
Bates	53
Wartburg	54
Washington and Lee	61
Rhode Island College	55

Sectional finals March 9, 2024; Providence, RI
Wartburg	68
Washington and Lee	58

=== Final Four ===
National semifinals March 14; Columbus, OH
NYU	57
Transylvania	42
Smith	61
Wartburg	54

National championship March 16; Columbus, OH
NYU	51
Smith	41

== See also ==
- 2024 NCAA Division I women's basketball tournament
- 2024 NCAA Division II women's basketball tournament
- 2024 NAIA women's basketball tournament
- 2024 NCAA Division III men's basketball tournament
