= 2015 NCAA Division III women's basketball tournament =

- Women's Division III
- Teams: 64
- Finals site: , Van Noord Arena; Grand Rapids, Michigan
- Champions: ~~Thomas More Saints~~ (1st title)
- Runner-up: George Fox Bruins (3rd title game)
- Third place: Montclair State Red Hawks
- Fourth place: Tufts Jumbos
- Winning coach: Jeff Hans (1st title)

The 2015 NCAA Division III women's basketball tournament was a single-elimination tournament that involved 64 teams playing to determine the winner of the NCAA Division III Women's Basketball Championship. It began on March 6, 2015, and concluded with the championship game on March 21, 2015, at the Van Noord Arena in Grand Rapids, Michigan.

The Thomas More Saints defeated the George Fox Bruins in the championship game, 83–63, to win their first national championship. The two remaining final four teams were the Montclair State Red Hawks and the Tufts Jumbos.

On November 16, 2016, the championship was vacated due to NCAA violations.

== Bracket ==
* – Denotes overtime period

=== Regional 1 – Grand Rapids, MI ===
First round March 6–7; Regional sites
George Fox	85
Penn State-Abington	23
Newberg, OR
Puget Sound	61
Claremont-Mudd-Scripps	56
Texas-Dallas	63
Rhodes	38
Richardson, Texas
Texas-Tyler	75
Southwestern	47
Calvin	80
Baldwin Wallace	66
Grand Rapids, MI
North Central, Ill	82
UW-Oshkosh	87
DePauw	83
Hanover	57
Greencastle, IN
Maryville College	66
John Carroll	56

Second round March 7–8; Regional sites
George Fox	67
Puget Sound	49
Texas-Dallas	67
Texas-Tyler	65
Calvin	91
UW-Oshkosh	71
DePauw	76
Maryville	53

Third round March 13; Calvin College; Grand Rapids, MI
George Fox	77
Texas-Dallas	73
Calvin	71
DePauw	62

Regional finals March 14; Calvin College; Grand Rapids, MI
George Fox	78
Calvin	63

=== Regional 2 – Upper Montclair, NJ ===
First round March 6 Regional sites
Montclair State	78
Regis College (Massachusetts)	45
Upper Montclair, NJ
Stevenson	67
Williams	55
Bowdoin	70
Babson	57
Brunswick, ME
Ithaca	82
Mount St. Vincent	72
Salisbury	66
Bridgewater State	63
Salisbury, MD
Stockton	68
McDaniel	49
NYU	51
Virginia Wesleyan	50
New York, NY
Amherst	68
Eastern	51

Second round March 7 Regional sites
Montclair State	53
Stevenson	48
Bowdoin	71
Ithaca	66
Salisbury	61
Stockton	54
NYU	47
Amherst	70

Third round March 13; Montclair State University; Upper Montclair, NJ
Montclair State	61
Bowdoin	54
Salisbury	63
Amherst	58

Regional finals March 14; Montclair State University; Upper Montclair, NJ
Montclair State	68
Salisbury	44

=== Regional 3 – Medford, MA ===
First round March 6 Regional sites
Tufts	87
Pine Manor	46
Medford, MA
St. John Fisher*	62
Skidmore	60
Scranton	48
Eastern Connecticut	50
Scranton, PA
Stevens	59
Baruch	70
FDU-Florham	84
Johnson and Wales	40
Teaneck, NJ
U. of New England	54
Catholic	50
Geneseo State	84
Castleton State	40
Geneseo, NY
Cabrini	57
Muhlenberg	60

Second round March 7 Regional sites
Tufts*	72
St. John Fisher	67
Eastern Connecticut	71
Baruch	62
FDU-Florham	91
U. of New England	75
Geneseo	69
Muhlenberg	54

Third round March 13; Tufts University;Medford, MA
Tufts	46
Eastern Connecticut	31
FDU-Florham	68
Geneseo	54

Regional finals March 14; Tufts University;Medford, MA
Tufts	58
FDU-Florham	52

=== Regional 4 – Crestview Hills, KY ===
First round March 6 Regional sites
~~Thomas More~~	83
Greensboro	61
Crestview Hills, KY
Eastern Mennonite	77
La Roche	76
Washington University in St. Louis	75
Spalding	64
St. Louis, MO
Transylvania	73
Wittenberg	80
St. Thomas	70
Minnesota-Morris	31
St Paul, MN
St. Norbert	61
Luther	72
Wheaton	67
Wisconsin Lutheran*	70
Wheaton, Il
Hope	75
Bethel	63

Second round March 7 Regional sites
~~Thomas More~~	85
Eastern Mennonite	65
Washington University in St. Louis	80
Wittenberg	58
St. Thomas	60
Luther	57
Wis. Lutheran	47
Hope	72

Third round March 13; Thomas More College;Crestview Hills, KY
~~Thomas More~~	103
Washington University in St. Louis	90
St. Thomas	55
Hope	47

Regional finals March 14; Thomas More College;Crestview Hills, KY
~~Thomas More~~	75
St. Thomas	58

== National Finals – Grand Rapids, Michigan ==
Semifinals; Friday, March 20
Tufts	52
~~Thomas More~~	62
George Fox	70
Montclair State	58

National championship Saturday, March 21
George Fox	63
~~Thomas More~~	83
Third place Saturday, March 21
Montclair State	56
Tufts	48

== See also ==
- 2015 NCAA Division I women's basketball tournament
- 2015 NCAA Division II women's basketball tournament
- 2015 NCAA Division I men's basketball tournament
- 2015 NCAA Division II men's basketball tournament
- 2015 NCAA Division III men's basketball tournament
- 2015 Women's National Invitation Tournament
- 2015 National Invitation Tournament
- 2015 NAIA Division I men's basketball tournament
- 2015 NAIA Division II men's basketball tournament
