= Cregger Center =

- Interactive map of Cregger Center
- Location: 287 High St, Salem, VA 24153
- Coordinates: 37.297702°N 80.05458199999998°W
- Owner: Roanoke College
- Operator: Roanoke College
- Capacity: 2,500
- Surface: Hardwood

Construction
- Opened: 2016
- Cost: $35 million
- Architect: VMDO
- General contractors: Branch and Associates

Tenants
- Roanoke Maroons; Men's Basketball, Women's Basketball, Men's Volleyball (Spring 2023), Women's Volleyball, Indoor Track & Field

The Cregger Center is a multi-purpose athletic and recreation facility in Salem, Virginia. Charles Moir Court is a 2,500 seat arena that houses the Roanoke College Men's and Women's basketball and volleyball teams. Kerr-Cregger Field House is the college's indoor track and field facility that serves as the home of the track & field teams for indoor events.

== Namesake ==
The Cregger Center is named for Morris Cregger, founder of the Cregger Company of Columbia, South Carolina and an alumnus of Roanoke College graduating in 1964. Mr. Cregger played basketball and ran on the track and field team at the college. He also serves on the Roanoke College Board of Trustees as its chairman.

Charles Moir Court is named after Charles Moir, who served as Roanoke's men's basketball coach for six seasons (1967–1973) and earned 133 wins, including the 1972 NCAA Division II national championship. Charles Moir's son, Page, served as head coach of the men's basketball team for 27 years (1989–2016) winning three Old Dominion Athletic Conference Championships, making five NCAA tournament appearances, and earning 428 wins.
