= 2020 NCAA Division III women's basketball tournament =

Abandoned basketball tournament

- Women's Division III
- Teams: 64
- Finals site: , Capital City Performance Arena; Columbus, Ohio
- Champions: Ex aequo when abandoned: Hope (highest ranked); Amherst; George Fox; Mary Hardin–Baylor; Christopher Newport; Loras; UW–Oshkosh; Baldwin Wallace; Bowdoin; Trine; Oglethorpe; Whitman; Tufts; Williams; Smith; Messiah

The 2020 NCAA Division III women's basketball tournament was a single-elimination tournament to determine the national champion of the women's NCAA Division III college basketball in the United States. Featuring sixty-four teams, it began on March 6, 2020, following the 2019–20 season, and was to conclude with the championship on March 21 at the Capital University Center Performance Arena in Columbus, Ohio; however, on March 12 the tournament was cancelled due to the coronavirus pandemic.

Of the 16 teams remaining, Hope College was the highest ranked team remaining from the D3Sports.com poll.

== Qualifying teams ==
=== Automatic bids (43) ===
The following 43 teams were automatic qualifiers for the 2020 NCAA field by virtue of winning their conference's automatic bid.

Automatic bids
| Qualifying school | Record (Conf.) | Conference | Qualifying school | Record (Conf.) | Conference |
|---|---|---|---|---|---|
| La Roche | 20–6 (18–2) | Allegheny Mountain | Wartburg | 24–3 (14–2) | American Rivers |
| Mary Hardin-Baylor | 24–4 (10–2) | American Southwest | Christopher Newport | 23–4 (10–0) | Capital Athletic |
| Haverford | 23–4 (18–2) | Centennial | Brooklyn | 21–6 (14–0) | CUNYAC |
| Illinois Wesleyan | 19–8 (11–5) | CCIW | Keystone | 21–6 (17–1) | Colonial States |
| Endicott | 18–10 (12–4) | Commonwealth Coast | St. John Fisher | 21–6 (12–2) | Empire 8 |
| Emmanuel (MA) | 21–7 (9–2) | Great Northeast | Transylvania | 25–2 (17–1) | Heartland Collegiate |
| Scranton | 24–3 (12–2) | Landmark | Ithaca | 22–5 (16–2) | Liberty |
| Eastern Connecticut St. | 23–4 (14–2) | Little East | Messiah | 23–4 (15–1) | MAC Commonwealth |
| DeSales | 23–4 (13–1) | MAC Freedom | Framingham State | 22–5 (12–0) | MASCAC |
| Hope | 27–0 (16–0) | Michigan Intercollegiate | Monmouth (IL) | 21–6 (14–4) | Midwest |
| Bethel (MN) | 26–1 (19–1) | Minnesota Intercollegiate | New England Col. | 21–6 (12–2) | NECC |
| Bowdoin | 25–2 (8–2) | NESCAC | Smith | 23–4 (7–3) | NEWMAC |
| Rowan | 23–4 (16–2) | New Jersey Athletic | Husson | 19–8 (14–0) | North Atlantic |
| DePauw | 27–1 (16–0) | North Coast | SUNY Poly | 20-7 (16-0) | North Eastern Athletic |
| Edgewood | 25–2 (18–2) | Northern Athletics | George Fox | 21–6 (11–5) | Northwest |
| Baldwin Wallace | 26–2 (17–1) | Ohio Athletic | Randolph–Macon | 18–9 (13–5) | Old Dominion |
| Grove City | 25–2 (14–2) | Presidents' | Webster | 20–7 (16–2) | SLIAC |
| Merchant Marine | 23–4 (14–2) | Skyline | Oglethorpe | 27–1 (14–0) | Southern Athletic |
| Redlands | 25–2 (15–1) | SCIAC | Austin | 23–4 (14–4) | Southern Collegiate |
| SUNY New Paltz | 24–3 (17–1) | SUNYAC | Chicago | 20–5 (11–3) | University Athletic |
| Bethany Lutheran | 21–6 (15–1) | Upper Midwest | Berea | 25–3 (15–1) | USA South |
| UW–Oshkosh | 18–10 (8–6) | Wisconsin Intercollegiate | | | |

=== At-large bids (21) ===
The following 21 teams were awarded qualification for the 2020 NCAA field by the NCAA Division III Women's Basketball Committee. The committee evaluated teams on the basis of their win-loss percentage, strength of schedule, head-to-head results, results against common opponents, and results against teams included in the NCAA's final regional rankings.

At-large bids
| Qualifying school | Record (Conf.) | Conference | Qualifying school | Record (Conf.) | Conference |
|---|---|---|---|---|---|
| Albright | 22–5 (12–4) | MAC Commonwealth | Benedictine (IL) | 24–3 (20–0) | Northern Athletics |
| Amherst | 22–4 (8–2) | NESCAC | Loras | 23–4 (13–3) | American Rivers |
| Gettysburg | 22–5 (17–3) | Centennial | Marymount (VA) | 23–4 (11–1) | Atlantic East |
| Montclair St. | 21–6 (15–3) | New Jersey Athletic | UW–La Crosse | 19–7 (10–4) | Wisconsin Intercollegiate |
| Widener | 21–5 (13–3) | MAC Commonwealth | Texas–Dallas | 22–5 (15–1) | American Southwest |
| Trinity (TX) | 23–4 (17–1) | Southern Collegiate | Trine | 21–6 (14–2) | Michigan Intercollegiate |
| SUNY Cortland | 21–6 (14–4) | SUNYAC | Tufts | 26–1 (10–0) | NESCAC |
| Western New England | 21–5 (14–2) | Commonwealth Coast | Williams | 18–8 (6–4) | NESCAC |
| NYU | 20–5 (10–4) | University Athletic | William Peace | 23–4 (15–1) | USA South |
| Wheaton (IL) | 20–7 (12–4) | CCIW | Whitman | 24–3 (15–1) | Northwest |
| UW–Whitewater | 23–3 (13–1) | Wisconsin Intercollegiate | | | |

== Tournament bracket ==
=== Top-left ===
First round March 6 Campus Sites
Tufts | 72
SUNY Poly | 34
Springfield, MA
SUNY Cortland | 72
Western New England | 66
Williams | 68
Albright | 46
Ithaca, NY
Ithaca | 72
New England Col. | 54
SUNY New Paltz | 69
Husson | 50
New Paltz, NY
DeSales | 72
Smith | 81
Eastern Connecticut St. | 60
St. John Fisher | 43
Mechanicsburg, PA
Messiah | 72
Keystone | 47

Second round March 7 Campus Sites
Tufts | 79
SUNY Cortland | 53
Williams | 69
Ithaca | 61
SUNY New Paltz | 60
Smith | 62
Eastern Connecticut St. | 50
Messiah | 60

~~Sectional Semifinals~~; March 13; Regional site
Tufts
Williams
Smith
Messiah

~~Sectional Final~~; March 14; Regional site

=== Bottom-left ===
First round March 6 Campus Sites
Bowdoin | 90
Brooklyn | 51
Brunswick, ME
NYU | 81
Emmanuel (MA) | 62
Trine | 65
Benedictine (IL) | 37
Whitewater, WI
UW–Whitewater | 62
Redlands | 70
Transylvania | 68
Randolph–Macon | 78
Lexington, KY
Oglethorpe | 88
William Peace | 74
Wheaton (IL) | 83
Whitman | 86*
Waverly, IA
Wartburg | 91
Monmouth (IL) | 55

Second round March 7 Campus Sites
Bowdoin | 86
NYU | 67
Trine | 69
Redlands | 49
Randolph–Macon | 63
Oglethorpe | 71
Whitman | 67
Wartburg | 63

~~Sectional Semifinals~~; March 13; Regional site
Bowdoin
Trine
Oglethorpe
Whitman

~~Sectional Final~~; March 14; Regional site

=== Top-right ===
First round March 6 Campus Sites
Amherst | 70
Framingham State | 46
Amherst, MA
Rowan | 72
Merchant Marine | 68
George Fox | 74
Montclair St. | 49
Arlington, VA
Marymount (VA) | 68
Gettysburg | 48
Trinity (TX) | 69
Texas–Dallas | 74
San Antonio, TX
Mary Hardin–Baylor | 78
Austin | 63
Christopher Newport | 82
Widener | 66
Scranton, PA
Scranton | 56
Endicott | 65

Second round March 7 Campus Sites
Amherst | 60
Rowan | 40
George Fox | 57
Marymount (VA) | 48
Texas–Dallas | 48
Mary Hardin–Baylor | 64
Christopher Newport | 74
Endicott | 71

~~Sectional Semifinals~~; March 13; Regional site
Amherst
George Fox
Mary Hardin–Baylor
Christopher Newport

~~Sectional Final~~; March 14; Regional site

=== Bottom-right ===
First round March 6 Campus Sites
DePauw | 71
Webster | 45
Greencastle, IN
Loras | 68
UW–La Crosse | 52
UW–Oshkosh | 61
Edgewood | 40
Arden Hills, MN
Bethel (MN) | 58
Bethany Lutheran | 62
Baldwin Wallace | 67
Haverford | 42
Berea, OH
Chicago | 80
La Roche | 57
Illinois Wesleyan | 67
Berea | 50
Holland, MI
Hope | 69
Grove City | 18

Second round March 7 Campus Sites
DePauw | 60
Loras | 71
UW–Oshkosh | 67
Bethany Lutheran | 60
Baldwin Wallace | 60
Chicago | 58
Illinois Wesleyan | 69
Hope | 72

~~Sectional Semifinals~~; March 13; Regional site
Loras
UW–Oshkosh
Baldwin Wallace
Hope

~~Sectional Final~~; March 14; Regional site

== Final Four ==
Those rounds were cancelled.

~~National semifinal~~ March 20; Columbus, OH
Columbus, OH

~~National championship~~ March 21; Columbus, OH

== See also ==
- 2020 NCAA Division I women's basketball tournament
- 2020 NCAA Division II women's basketball tournament
- 2020 NCAA Division I men's basketball tournament
- 2020 NCAA Division II men's basketball tournament
- 2020 NCAA Division III men's basketball tournament
- 2020 Women's National Invitation Tournament
- 2020 National Invitation Tournament
- 2020 NAIA Division I women's basketball tournament
- 2020 NAIA Division II women's basketball tournament
- 2020 NAIA Division I men's basketball tournament
- 2020 NAIA Division II men's basketball tournament
