= Thomas More Saints =

College sports teams of Ceadarville university

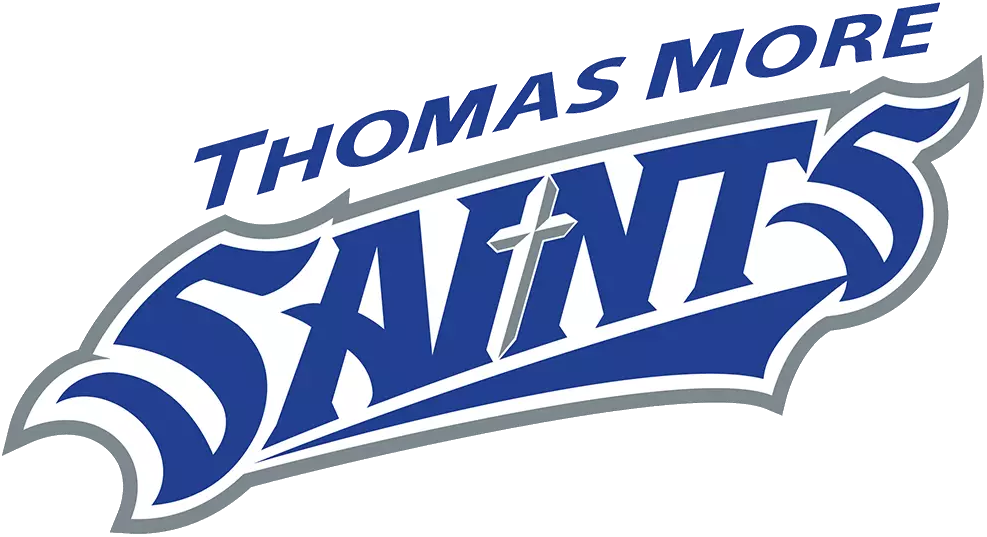
- University: Thomas More University
- Nickname: Saints
- NCAA: Division II
- Conference: G-MAC
- Athletic director: Terry Connor
- Location: Crestview Hills, Kentucky
- Varsity teams: 21 (11 men's, 10 women's)
- Football stadium: Republic Bank Field
- Basketball arena: Connor Convocation Center
- Baseball stadium: Thomas More Stadium
- Softball stadium: Thomas More Softball Field
- Soccer stadium: Republic Bank Field
- Tennis venue: Five Seasons Family Sports Club
- Volleyball arena: Connor Convocation Center
- Other venues: Super Bowl Bellewood in Newport (bowling)
- Colors: Blue and gray
- Website: thomasmoresaints.com

The Thomas More Saints are the athletic teams that represent Thomas More University, located in Crestview Hills, Kentucky, in National Collegiate Athletic Association (NCAA) intercollegiate sports. The Saints are members of the NCAA's Division II, and they compete in the Great Midwest Athletic Conference (G-MAC). Previously a member of the Mid-South Conference of the National Association of Intercollegiate Athletics, Thomas More began transitioning to the NCAA's Division II and the G-MAC in July 2022. The Saints first became eligible for conference championships and tournaments in the 2023–24 academic year and for NCAA Championships beginning in the 2025–26 academic year.

Some sports not sponsored by the G-MAC have separate affiliations; notably, the men's volleyball team competes as a de facto Division I member due to the NCAA sponsoring a single national championship for Divisions I and II. That team competed as an independent in the 2025 season (2024–25 school year) before becoming a single-sport member of the Great Lakes Valley Conference for that conference's first season of men's volleyball in spring 2026.

== History ==
Thomas More announced its transition to NCAA Division II athletics in July 2022. The Saints had been in the NAIA for the past two academic years and retained NAIA membership until completion of the 2022–23 academic year. The Saints previously competed as a member of the Division III ranks of the National Collegiate Athletic Association (NCAA), primarily competing in the short-lived American Collegiate Athletic Association (ACAA) during only the 2018–19 school year; as well as a member of the Presidents' Athletic Conference (PAC) from 2005–06 to 2017–18.

Thomas More had previously been members of the NAIA from 1947–48 to 1989–90.

== Varsity teams ==
Men's sports	Women's sports
Baseball	Basketball
Basketball	Bowling
Bowling	Cross country
Cross country	Golf
Football	Lacrosse
Golf	Soccer
Lacrosse	Softball
Soccer	Tennis
Tennis	Track and field
Track and field	Volleyball
Wrestling	

== Intercollegiate teams ==
Archery, esports, and rugby.

== Facilities ==
Thomas More University and the Florence Y'alls Baseball Club partnered in March 2022 to rename the home of the Florence Y'alls "Thomas More Stadium". As part of the agreement, the stadium will also become the home of the Thomas More Saints’ baseball team starting in spring 2023. Thomas More announced a major comprehensive fundraising campaign in Fall 2021 in support of a five-year strategic plan that includes enhanced athletic facilities for many of the Saints 29 sports teams.

Additional plans are in place for other facility upgrades at the university that will affect additional Saints sports teams positively; renovations at Republic Bank Field and its track were completed in 2021.

Venue	Sport(s)	Open.	Ref
Thomas More Stadium	Baseball	2004	
Republic Bank Field	Football; Soccer; Rugby	2008	
Connor Convocation Center	Basketball; Volleyball; Wrestling	1989	
Thomas More Softball Field	Softball	1998	
Five Seasons Family Sports Club	Tennis	n/a	

== Accomplishments ==
=== National championships ===
Sport	Titles	Winning years	Notes	Ref.
Basketball (women's)	2	2015–16, 2018–19		
Rugby (men's)	1	2021		
Golf (women's)	1	2002	Lynn Thompson (individual)	

=== Championship history ===
Sport	Conference season titles	Conference tournament titles	NCAA / NAIA tournament appearances
Baseball	1956, 1964, 1965, 1966, 2008, 2011, 2015, 2016	2010, 2011, 2014, 2016, 2018	2000, 2003, 2010, 2011, 2013, 2014, 2016, 2018
Basketball (men's)	2009, 2010, 2017, 2018, 2022	1995, 1996, 2009, 2017, 2018	1959, 2009, 2017, 2018, 2020, 2021, 2022
Basketball (women's)	2006, 2007, 2008, 2009, 2010, 2011, 2012, 2013, 2014, 2016, 2017, 2018, 2021, 2022	2007, 2008, 2009, 2010, 2011, 2012, 2013, 2014, 2016, 2017, 2018, 2019, 2021	1997, 2001, 2004, 2007, 2008, 2009, 2010, 2011, 2012, 2013, 2014, 2016, 2017, 2018, 2019, 2020, 2021, 2022
Competitive Dance		2022	2022
Football	2008, 2009, 2010, 2011, 2013, 2014, 2015, 2016		1992, 2001, 2008, 2009, 2010, 2011, 2015, 2016
Golf (men's)		2010, 2017	2010, 2017
Golf (women's)		2017	2017
Track and field (men's) –indoor		2017	
Rugby (men's)		2019, 2021	2017, 2018, 2019, 2021
Soccer (men's)	2009, 2011, 2012, 2013, 2014, 2015, 2017	2009, 2010, 2011, 2012, 2013, 2014, 2017, 2018	2009, 2010, 2011, 2012, 2013, 2014, 2015, 2017
Soccer (women's)	2006, 2008, 2009, 2010, 2012, 2013, 2014, 2015, 2016, 2017	2005, 2011, 2012, 2013, 2014, 2015, 2016, 2017, 2018	2003, 2011, 2012, 2013, 2014, 2015, 2016, 2017, 2018.
Softball	2006, 2008, 2009, 2010, 2014, 2015, 2017, 2018	2007, 2009, 2010, 2013, 2015, 2017, 2018, 2019	2005, 2006, 2009, 2010, 2013, 2014, 2015, 2017, 2018, 2019
Tennis (men's)		1983, 1986, 1987, 1992, 1993, 1994, 1995, 2017, 2018	1983, 1984, 1986, 1989, 2017, 2018
Volleyball (women's)	2007, 2009. 2010, 2012, 2014, 2015, 2016, 2017	1985, 1986, 1991, 1992, 1993, 1994, 1995, 2006, 2007, 2010, 2012, 2013, 2014, 2015, 2017, 2018	1983, 1985, 1991, 1992, 1993, 1994, 1995, 1997, 1999, 2003, 2009, 2010, 2012, 2013, 2014, 2015, 2017, 2018
Wrestling	2017		2021, 2022

=== Individual national qualifiers ===
Sport	Player	Season(s)	Event(s)
Golf (women's)	Lynn Thompson	2002	
Track and field (men's)	Lucas Nare	2014	100 and 200-meter dash
	Chris Wainscott	2021	Shot Put
	Chris Wainscott	2022	Shot Put and Discus
Track and field (men's) –indoor	Jacob Steinmetz	2020	Weight Throw
	Chris Wainscott	2022	Weight Throw and Shot Put
	Devin Webster	2022	Shot Put
Track and field (women's)	Christina Cook	2015, 16, 17, 18	400-meter run
Track and field (women's) –indoor	Christina Cook	2017	400-meter run
Cross country (women's)	Annabel Clayton	2019, 20, 21	
Swimming (women's)	Shelby Miller	2020	200, 500 and 1650-yard freestyle
Wrestling	Wilder Wichman	2020, 21, 22	157
	Andrew Taylor	2020, 22	174
	Avery Jones	2020	184
	James Caniglia	2020	197
	Shay Horton	2021, 22	125
	Ryan Moore	2021, 22	141, 149
	Daulton Mayer	2021, 22	197
