= Wisconsin–Whitewater Warhawks =

- University: University of Wisconsin–Whitewater
- Nickname: Warhawks
- NCAA: Division III
- Conference: WIAC
- Athletic director: Ryan Callahan
- Location: Whitewater, Wisconsin
- Football stadium: Perkins Stadium
- Basketball arena: Williams Center
- Other venues: Kachel Fieldhouse
- Colors: Purple and white
- Mascot: Willie Warhawk
- Fight song: Warhawk Battle Cry
- Website: uwwsports.com
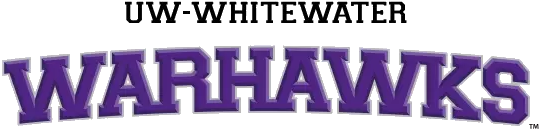

Team NCAA championships
- 15

The Wisconsin–Whitewater Warhawks (or UW–Whitewater Warhawks) are the athletic teams of the University of Wisconsin–Whitewater. Twenty Warhawk athletic teams compete in NCAA Division III. The Warhawks often rank among the top of NCAA Division III schools in the NACDA Director's Cup standings.

On May 27, 2014, UW–Whitewater made history as the first NCAA institution in any division to win national championships in football, men's basketball, and baseball in a single academic year.

== Varsity sports ==
Men's sports	Women's sports
Baseball	Basketball
Basketball	Bowling
Cross country	Cross country
Football	Golf
Soccer	Gymnastics
Swimming	Soccer
Tennis	Softball
Track and field	Swimming
Wrestling	Tennis
	Track and field
	Volleyball

=== Baseball ===
Wisconsin–Whitewater has had 14 Major League Baseball draft selections since the draft began in 1965.

Warhawks in the Major League Baseball Draft
Year	Player	Round	Team
1967	Robert Berezowitz	46	Twins
1990	Bob Wickman	2	White Sox
1993	Kris Hanson	5	Indians
1994	Kyle Karvala	31	Phillies
1996	Travis Tank	32	Brewers
1997	Erik Lorenz	19	Blue Jays
2003	Travis Van Zile	26	Diamondbacks
2004	Brady Endl	10	Braves
2005	Kevin Tomasiewicz	26	Mets
2005	Greg Reinhard	6	Devil Rays
2009	Aaron Dott	31	Rays
2010	Ben Versnik	38	Mariners
2016	Lake Bachar	5	Padres
2016	Austin Jones	26	Cubs

=== Football ===
The Warhawks compete in the WIAC conference of NCAA Division III football. In the 2005 and 2006 seasons, they finished the year undefeated in regular season play, losing only in the Amos Alonzo Stagg Bowls of 2005 and 2006 to the University of Mount Union (then Mount Union College), under former coach and UW–Whitewater alum Bob Berezowitz (UW–Whitewater 1967), who had quarterbacked the UW–Whitewater team as the runner-up in the 1966 National Association of Intercollegiate Athletics playoffs.

The Warhawks have won Wisconsin Intercollegiate Athletic Conference Championship 39 times: 1913, 1914, 1922, 1932, 1937, 1940, 1941, 1950, 1959, 1960, 1962, 1966, 1967, 1969, 1974, 1975, 1978, 1980, 1984, 1987, 1988, 1990, 1994, 1997, 1998, 2005, 2006, 2007, 2008, 2009, 2010, 2011, 2013, 2014, 2016, 2018, 2019, 2021, and 2022

== National championships ==
=== NCAA Division III ===
- Women's volleyball 2002, 2005
- Baseball 2005, 2014, 2025
- Men's basketball 1984, 1989, 2012, 2014
- Football 2007, 2009, 2010, 2011, 2013, 2014

=== Other ===
- Women's Gymnastics 2012, 2013, 2014 (National Collegiate Gymnastics Association Division III)

== Notable athletes ==
- Jeff Jagodzinski, former head football coach for Boston College
- Lance Leipold, current head football coach at the University at Kansas
- Matt Turk, former NFL punter .
- Bob Wickman, Major League Baseball relief pitcher
- Derek Stanley, former NFL wide receiver
- Eric Studesville, current NFL assistant coach
- Pete Schmitt, former NFL fullback and tight end
- Justin Beaver, winner of the Gagliardi Trophy (2007)
- Matt Blanchard, former NFL quarterback
- Jake Kumerow, former NFL wide receiver
- Quinn Meinerz, offensive lineman for the Denver Broncos
- T. J. Otzelberger, current head basketball coach at Iowa State University
