= Hope Flying Dutch women's basketball =

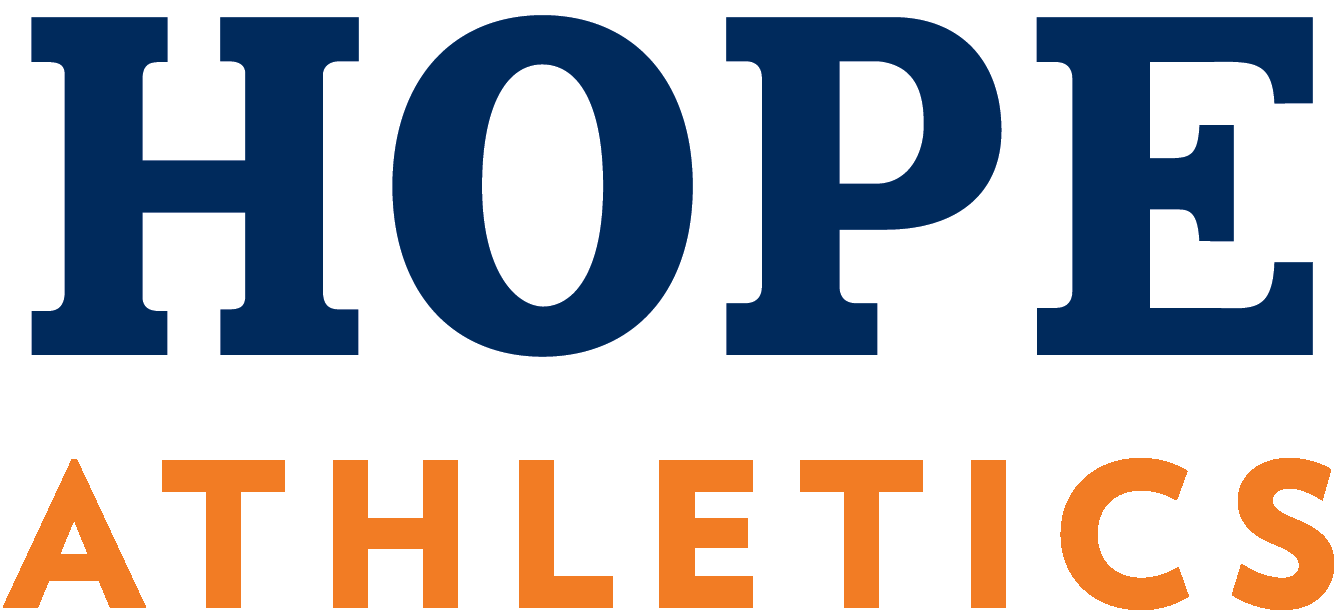
- University: Hope College
- First season: 1972; 54 years ago
- Head coach: Brian Morehouse (30th season)
- Location: Holland, Michigan
- Arena: DeVos Fieldhouse (capacity: 3,400)
- NCAA division: Division III
- Conference: Michigan Intercollegiate Athletic Association
- Nickname: Flying Dutch
- Colors: Orange and blue
- Student section: Dew Crew
- All-time record: 998–352 (.739)

NCAA Division III tournament champions
- 1990, 2006, 2022
Other NCAA Division III tournament results
Runner-up	2008, 2010
Final Four	1990, 2006, 2008, 2010, 2022
Elite Eight	1990, 2003, 2008, 2010, 2013, 2018, 2022
Sweet Sixteen	1990, 2002, 2003, 2006, 2008, 2009, 2010, 2011, 2013, 2014, 2015, 2017, 2018, 2020, 2022, 2026
Appearances	1990, 1995, 1998, 1999, 2001, 2002, 2003, 2006, 2007, 2008, 2009, 2010, 2011, 2013, 2014, 2016, 2017, 2018, 2019, 2020, 2022, 2024, 2026

Conference tournament champions
- 1995, 1998, 2001, 2002, 2003, 2006, 2007, 2008, 2009, 2010, 2013, 2014, 2016, 2018, 2020, 2021, 2022, 2023, 2026

Conference regular-season champions
- 1990, 1995, 2000, 2001, 2002, 2003, 2005, 2006, 2008, 2009, 2010, 2011, 2013, 2014, 2016, 2017, 2018, 2020, 2021, 2022, 2023, 2024

The Hope Flying Dutch women's basketball program represents Hope College in women's basketball at the NCAA Division III level as a member of the Michigan Intercollegiate Athletic Association.
