= David Moe (women's basketball) =

American college basketball coach

Current position
- Title: Head coach
- Team: Dakota State
- Conference: Frontier
- Record: 201–100 (.668)

Coaching career (HC unless noted)
- 2007–2017: Mayville State (assistant)
- 2017–present: Dakota State

Head coaching record
- Overall: 201–100 (.668)
- Tournaments: 15–6 (NAIA)

Accomplishments and honors

Championships
- Frontier regular season (2026); 3 NSAA tournament (2021–2022, 2025); 5 NSAA regular season (2021–2025)

Awards
- Frontier Coach of the Year (2026); 6x NSAA Coach of the Year (2020–2025)

David Moe is an American women's basketball coach, currently the head coach for the Dakota State Trojans.

== Coaching career ==
=== Mayville State ===
Moe graduated from Mayville State University in 2009. While attending Mayville State, he would serve as an assistant coach for their women's basketball team under head coach Dennis Hutter. Following his graduation, he would continue his role as an assistant coach until his eventual departure in 2017.

=== Dakota State ===
On June 9, 2017, it was announced that Moe would be taking over as the head coach of the Dakota State Trojans women's basketball team. During his time at Dakota State, Moe has won five NSAA regular season championships, three NSAA tournaments, and one Frontier regular season championship. He has also been named the NSAA Coach of the Year six times and the Frontier Coach of the Year once. Moe currently has the second most overall wins for a head coach at Dakota State with 200.

== Head coaching record ==
Record table
Season	Team	Overall	Conference	Standing	Postseason
Dakota State Trojans (North Star Athletic Association) (2017–2025)
2017–18	Dakota State	12–19	8–8	T–5th	
2018–19	Dakota State	4–25	3–11	7th	
2019–20	Dakota State	17–14	10–4	3rd	
2020–21	Dakota State	27–4	14–0	1st	NAIA Quarterfinal
2021–22	Dakota State	27–8	13–1	1st	NAIA Second Round
2022–23	Dakota State	29–7	13–1	1st	NAIA Semifinal
2023–24	Dakota State	28–7	11–1	T–1st	NAIA Quarterfinal
2024–25	Dakota State	25–5	14–1	1st	NAIA Second Round
Dakota State Trojans (Frontier Conference) (2025–present)
2025–26	Dakota State	30–6	19–3	1st	NAIA Semifinal
2026–27	Dakota State	2–5	1–0		
Dakota State:		201–100 (.668)	106–30 (.779)		
Total:		201–100 (.668)			
National champion Postseason invitational champion Conference regular season champion Conference regular season and conference tournament champion Division regular season champion Division regular season and conference tournament champion Conference tournament champion

== Personal life ==
Moe is originally from Barnesville, Minnesota. He received a master's degree from Ohio University in 2015. He has three daughters and a wife named Sheena.
