= Colby Blaine =

American basketball coach

Current position
- Title: Head coach
- Team: Idaho Coyotes

Biographical details
- Education: Montana Western (2009)

Playing career
- 2005–2007: Blue Mountain CC

Coaching career (HC unless noted)
- 2007–2009: Montana Western (student assistant)
- 2009–2014: College of Southern Idaho (assistant)
- 2014–2017: College of Idaho (assistant)
- 2017–2018: College of Idaho (associate HC)
- 2018–present: College of Idaho

Head coaching record
- Overall: 231–42 (.846)

Accomplishments and honors

Championships
- 2 NAIA championship (2023, 2025); 6 CCC regular season (2019,2020, 2022–2025); 5 CCC tournament (2019, 2020, 2022, 2023, 2025)

Awards
- 2 NABC NAIA Coach of the Year (2023, 2025); 4 CCC Coach of the Year (2020, 2022, 2023, 2025)

Colby Blaine is an American college basketball coach who is the head coach of the College of Idaho Coyotes men's basketball team.

== Early life and playing career ==
Blaine grew up in Boise, Idaho and attended Boise High School. He initially attended and played basketball Blue Mountain Community College. He transferred after two years to the University of Montana Western, where he served as a student assistant on the basketball team.

== Coaching career ==
After graduating from Montana Western, Blaine was hired as an assistant coach at the College of Southern Idaho. He also enrolled at Idaho State University and received a master's degree in athletic administration in 2010.

Blaine was hired as an assistant coach under Scott Garson at the College of Idaho in 2014. He was promoted to associate head coach in 2017 and hired as the Coyotes' head coach after Garson departed the program to become an assistant at NCAA Division I Santa Clara in 2018. Blaine coached the Coyotes to their second NAIA national championship with a 73–71 win over Indiana Tech in the 2023 NAIA national championship game. He won his second national title at the College of Idaho after winning the 2025 NAIA tournament.

== Head coaching record ==
Record table
Season	Team	Overall	Conference	Standing	Postseason
College of Idaho (Cascade Collegiate Conference) (2018–present)
2018–19	College of Idaho	31–6	16–4	1st	NAIA Division II Fab Four
2019–20	College of Idaho	31–3	20–0	1st	2020 NAIA Division II Second Round
2020–21	College of Idaho	8–9			
2021–22	College of Idaho	32–5	20–2	1st	NAIA Elite Eight
2022–23	College of Idaho	36–1	22–0	1st	NAIA Champion
2023–24	College of Idaho	32–4	21–1	1st	NAIA Fab Four
2024–25	College of Idaho	35–2	21–1	1st	NAIA Champion
2025–26	College of Idaho	21–11	14–6	5th	NAIA Second Round
2026–27	College of Idaho	5–1	0–0		
College of Idaho:		231–42 (.846)	124–15 (.892)		
Total:		231–42 (.846)			
National champion Postseason invitational champion Conference regular season champion Conference regular season and conference tournament champion Division regular season champion Division regular season and conference tournament champion Conference tournament champion
