= Dennis Hutter =

American basketball coach

Current position
- Title: Head coach
- Team: North Dakota
- Conference: Summit League
- Record: 8–25 (.242)

Biographical details
- Education: Bethel; Southwest Minnesota State

Coaching career (HC unless noted)
- –: Centennial HS
- 2002–2005: Southwest Minnesota State (asst.)
- 2005–2024: Mayville State
- 2024–2025: North Dakota (assoc. HC)
- 2025–present: North Dakota

Head coaching record
- Overall: 322–232 (.581)
- Tournaments: 4–5 (NAIA)

Accomplishments and honors

Championships
- AII regular season (2013); 4 NSAA regular season (2014, 2019, 2020, 2024); 4 NSAA tournament (2014, 2020, 2023, 2024)

Awards
- 2x NSAA Coach of the Year (2014, 2019)

Dennis Hutter is an American basketball coach who is the current head coach of the North Dakota Fighting Hawks women's basketball team.

== Coaching career ==
On March 29, 2024, Hutter was hired as the associate head coach of the North Dakota Fighting Hawks women's basketball team. Hutter became head coach the following season after Mallory Bernhard stepped down on March 25, 2025.

== Head coaching record ==
Record table
Season	Team	Overall	Conference	Standing	Postseason
Mayville State Comets (Dakota Athletic Conference) (2005–2011)
2005–06	Mayville State	12–15	–		
2006–07	Mayville State	16–13	–		
2007–08	Mayville State	16–12	–		
2008–09	Mayville State	3–24	–		
2009–10	Mayville State	5–21	–		
2010–11	Mayville State	4–20	2–12		
Mayville State Comets (NAIA Independent) (2011–2013)
2011–12	Mayville State	14–12	2–6		
2012–13	Mayville State	20–6	1–0		NAIA DII First Round
Mayville State Comets (North Star Athletic Association) (2013–2024)
2013–14	Mayville State	25–4	7–1	T–1st	NAIA DII Second Round
2014–15	Mayville State	18–8	6–4	3rd	
2015–16	Mayville State	16–13	6–7	T–4th	
2016–17	Mayville State	17–12	9–7	T–4th	
2017–18	Mayville State	20–9	10–6	4th	
2018–19	Mayville State	19–8	11–3	T–1st	
2019–20	Mayville State	25–6	11–3	T–1st	NAIA DII First Round
2020–21	Mayville State	14–8	8–6	T–4th	
2021–22	Mayville State	20–7	11–3	2nd	
2022–23	Mayville State	24–6	12–2	2nd	NAIA Second Round
2023–24	Mayville State	26–3	11–1	T–1st	NAIA Round of 16
Mayville State:		314–207 (.603)	107–61 (.637)		
North Dakota Fighting Hawks (Summit League) (2025–present)
2025–26	North Dakota	7–24	3–13	T–8th	
2026–27	North Dakota	1–1	0–0		
North Dakota:		8–25 (.242)	3–13 (.188)		
Total:		322–232 (.581)			
National champion Postseason invitational champion Conference regular season champion Conference regular season and conference tournament champion Division regular season champion Division regular season and conference tournament champion Conference tournament champion

== Coaching tree ==
Assistant coaches under Hutter that became NCAA, NAIA, or NBA head coaches

- David Moe – Dakota State (2017–present)
