= 2025 NAIA women's basketball tournament =

College basketball tournament held in Iowa

- Teams: 64
- Finals site: Tyson Events Center, Sioux City, Iowa
- Champions: Dordt (2nd title, 2nd title game)
- Runner-up: Indiana Wesleyan (3rd title game)
- Chuck Taylor MVP: Macy Sievers (Dordt)

The 2025 NAIA women's basketball tournament was a tournament held by the NAIA to determine the national champion of women's college basketball among its member programs in the United States and Canada, culminating the 2024–25 NAIA women's basketball season.

The tournament finals were played at the Tyson Events Center in Sioux City, Iowa, from March 20–25, 2025.

Defending champion Dordt University won their second consecutive title over Indiana Wesleyan, who was entering their third title game.

== Qualification ==
The tournament featured sixty-four teams in a simple single-elimination format. The first two preliminary rounds were played on regional campus sites on March 14–15, and all subsequent rounds were played from March 20–25 in Sioux City.

== Tournament bracket ==
=== Cramer quadrant ===
First round March 14
1	Bethel (TN)	70
16	Sterling (KS)	50
8	Benedictine (KS)	80
9	LSU–Alexandria	41
5	LSU–Shreveport	56
12	Huntington (IN)	64
4	Hastings	112
13	College of the Ozarks	84
6	Xavier (LA)	77
11	Southeastern (FL)	59
3	William Carey (MS)	70
14	Lindsey Wilson	61
7	Wayland Baptist (TX)	72
10	Carroll (MT)	63
2	Southern Oregon	86
15	UC Merced	52

Second round March 15
1	Bethel (TN)	67
8	Benedictine (KS)	52
4	Hastings	90
12	Huntington (IN)	66
3	William Carey (MS)	47
6	Xavier (LA)	72
2	Southern Oregon	78
7	Wayland Baptist (TX)	52

Round of 16; March 20
1	Bethel (TN)	78
4	Hastings	70
6	Xavier (LA)	67
2	Southern Oregon	70

Quarterfinals; March 22
1	Bethel (TN)	74
2	Southern Oregon	70

=== Duer quadrant ===
First round March 14
1	Campbellsville	77
16	Lourdes	49
8	Mobile	69
9	Williams Baptist	82
5	Governors State	74
12	Arizona Christian	53
4	Dakota State	81
13	Montana Tech	63
6	Lewis–Clark State	75
11	Columbia (MO)	59
3	Briar Cliff	65
14	Spring Arbor	61
7	Mid-America Christian	73
10	Northwestern (IA)	63
2	MidAmerica Nazarene	69
15	Kansas Wesleyan	70

Second round March 15
1	Campbellsville	80
9	Williams Baptist	64
4	Dakota State	69
5	Governors State	75
3	Briar Cliff	71
6	Lewis–Clark State	60
7	Mid-America Christian	94
15	Kansas Wesleyan	74

Round of 16; March 21
1	Campbellsville	52
5	Governors State	59
3	Briar Cliff	80
7	Mid-America Christian	64

Quarterfinals; March 22
5	Governors State	43
3	Briar Cliff	65

=== Liston quadrant ===
First round March 14
1	Indiana Wesleyan	85
16	Philander Smith	51
8	Grand View	95
9	Olivet Nazarene	77
5	Providence (MT)	56
12	College of Idaho	58
4	Georgetown (KY)	93
13	Jamestown (ND)	62
6	Rio Grande	79
11	Stillman	83
3	Saint Francis (IN)	60
14	Indiana Tech	64
7	Florida Memorial	85
10	IU Northwest	76
2	Freed–Hardeman	79
15	Johnson	43

Second round March 15
1	Indiana Wesleyan	71
8	Grand View	60
4	Georgetown (KY)	79
12	College of Idaho	70
11	Stillman	54
14	Indiana Tech	64
2	Freed–Hardeman	68
7	Florida Memorial	47

Round of 16; March 21
1	Indiana Wesleyan	74
4	Georgetown (KY)	57
14	Indiana Tech	43
2	Freed–Hardeman	54

Quarterfinals; March 22
1	Indiana Wesleyan	77
2	Freed–Hardeman	46

=== Naismith quadrant ===
First round March 14–15
1	Dordt	95
16	Haskell	80
8	St. Francis (IL)	89
9	Rocky Mountain (MT)	79
5	Dakota Wesleyan	91
12	The Master's	70
4	Langston	61*
13	Blue Mountain Christian	59
6	Oregon Tech	74
11	Milligan	83
3	Marian (IN)	73
14	Saint Xavier	63
7	Shawnee State	70
10	Loyola (LA)	62
2	Cumberlands	62
15	Eastern Oregon	51

Second round March 15–16
1	Dordt	73
8	St. Francis (IL)	48
5	Dakota Wesleyan	68
4	Langston	79
3	Marian (IN)	76
11	Milligan	66
2	Cumberlands	71
7	Shawnee State	66

Round of 16; March 20
1	Dordt	55
4	Langston	51
3	Marian (IN)	77
2	Cumberlands	72

Quarterfinals; March 22
1	Dordt	82
3	Marian (IN)	61

=== Semifinals and Finals ===
- Site: Tyson Events Center, Sioux City, Iowa

Semifinals; March 24
1 N	Dordt	84
1 C	Bethel (TN)	52
3 D	Briar Cliff	69
1 L	Indiana Wesleyan	70

Finals; March 25; 7:00 p.m.
1 N	Dordt	82
1 L	Indiana Wesleyan	73

* denotes overtime

== See also ==
- 2025 NAIA men's basketball tournament
- 2025 NCAA Division I women's basketball tournament
- 2025 NCAA Division II women's basketball tournament
- 2025 NCAA Division III women's basketball tournament
