= Dakota State Trojans women's basketball =

2024–25 Dakota State Trojans women's basketball team
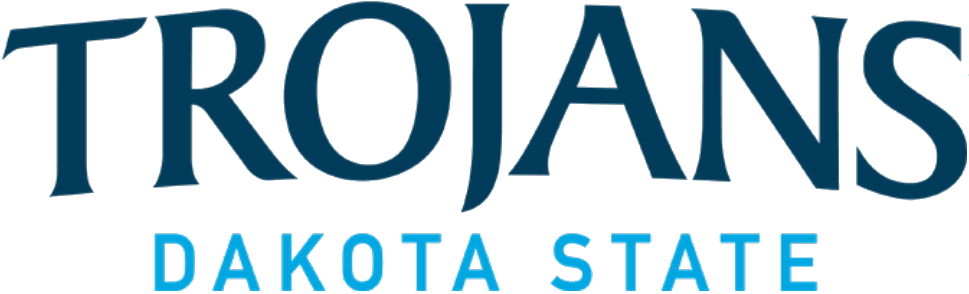
- University: Dakota State University
- First season: 1975–1976
- Athletic director: Bud Postma
- Head coach: David Moe (8th season)
- Location: Madison, South Dakota
- Arena: DSU Fieldhouse
- Conference: Frontier Conference
- Nickname: Trojans
- Colors: Trojan blue, DSU blue, and gray

NAIA tournament appearances
- 2000, 2001, 2003, 2006, 2007, 2008, 2021, 2022, 2023, 2024, 2025, 2026

Conference tournament champions
- 2000, 2021, 2022, 2025

Conference regular-season champions
- 1980, 1981, 1982, 1983, 1984, 1985, 1986, 1987, 1989, 1990, 2000, 2001, 2006, 2007, 2008, 2021, 2022, 2023, 2024, 2025, 2026

The Dakota State Trojans women's basketball team represents Dakota State University, competing as a member of the North Star Athletic Association (NSAA) in the National Association of Intercollegiate Athletics (NAIA). During the 2025–26 academic year, the Trojans will be moving to the Frontier Conference. The Trojans play their home games at the DSU Fieldhouse in Madison, South Dakota. Their current head coach is David Moe.

== History ==
=== Conference affiliations ===
- South Dakota Intercollegiate Conference (1975–2000)
- Dakota Athletic Conference (2000–2011)
- NAIA independent (2011–2013)
- North Star Athletic Association (2013–2025)
- Frontier Conference (2025–)

== Conference championships ==
The Trojans have won 21 regular season championships and 4 conference tournament championships.

South Dakota Intercollegiate Conference (1978–2000)
Championship	Years
Regular Season (11)	1980, 1981, 1982, 1983, 1984, 1985, 1986, 1987, 1989, 1990, 2000
Tournament (1)	2000

Dakota Athletic Conference (2000–2011)
Championship	Years
Regular Season (4)	2001, 2006, 2007, 2008

North Star Athletic Association (2013–2025)
Championship	Years
Regular Season (5)	2021, 2022, 2023, 2024, 2025
Tournament (3)	2021, 2022, 2025

Frontier Conference (2025–present)
Championship	Years
Regular Season (1)	2026

== Postseason ==
=== NAIA tournament results ===
Dakota State has appeared in the NAIA tournament 12 times. Their combined record is 21–12.

Year	Round	Opponent	Result
2000	First Round; Second Round; Quarterfinals	St. Thomas Aquinas; Briar Cliff; Northwest Nazarene	W 74–55; W 58–54; L 55–70
2001	First Round; Second Round	Indiana Southeast; Saint Francis	W 59–43; L 56–62
2003	First Round	Evangel	L 45–54
2006	First Round; Second Round; Quarterfinals	Shawnee State; Tabor; Hastings	W 59–55; W 77–58; L 41–55
2007	First Round	Taylor	L 56–67
2008	First Round; Second Round	Ohio Dominican; Bethel	W 76–73; L 67–70
2021	Second Round; Round of 16; Quarterfinals	Providence; Sterling; Thomas More	W 77–66; W 91–77; L 47–72
2022	First Round; Second Round	Hope International; Rocky Mountain	W 69–63; L 73–89
2023	First Round; Second Round; Round of 16; Quarterfinals; Semifinals	Morningside; Eastern Oregon; Carroll; Indiana Wesleyan; Clarke	W 78–65; W 86–69; W 82–72; W 71–70; L 69–79
2024	First Round; Second Round; Round of 16; Quarterfinals	Science and Arts; Indiana South Bend; Indiana Wesleyan; Carroll	W 86–69; W 85–47; W 76–65; L 56–71
2025	First Round; Second Round	Montana Tech; Governors State	W 81–63; L 69–75
2026	First Round; Second Round; Round of 16; Quarterfinals; Semifinals	Grand View; Bethel; Indiana Wesleyan; Georgetown; Dordt	W 102–51; W 104–74; W 73–65; W 85–79; L 69–83

=== Frontier tournament results ===
Dakota State has appeared in the Frontier Conference tournament once. Their combined record is 2–1.

Year	Seed	Round	Opponent	Result	Ref.
2026	1	Quarterfinals; Semifinals; Championship	Bismarck State; MSU–Northern; Montana Tech	W 106–77; W 73–57; L 72–76	

=== NSAA tournament results ===
Dakota State appeared in the NSAA tournament 12 times. Their combined record is 14–9

Tournament Champions

Year	Round	Opponent	Result
2014	Quarterfinals; Semifinals	Presentation; Mayville State	W 97–69; L 74–102
2015	Quarterfinals	Valley City State	L 62–68
2016	Quarterfinals	Mayville State	L 79–88
2017	Quarterfinals	Dickinson State	L 45–59
2018	Quarterfinals	Mayville State	L 68–83
2019	Quarterfinals	Bellevue	L 45–65
2020	Quarterfinals; Semifinals	Dickinson State; Mayville State	W 94–62; L 82–85
2021	Quarterfinals; Semifinals; Championship	Presentation; Mayville State; Bellevue	W 99–34; W 72–55; W 80–72
2022	Quarterfinals; Semifinals; Championship	Waldorf; Dickinson State; Bellevue	W 93–52; W 85–65; W 83–69
2023	Quarterfinals; Semifinals; Championship	Presentation; Dickinson State; Mayville State	W 116–40; W 82–37; L 52–66
2024	Quarterfinals; Semifinals; Championship	Waldorf; Dickinson State; Mayville State	W 99–43; W 72–50; L 59–61
2025	Semifinals; Championship	Valley City State; Jamestown	W 64–56; W 65–59

== Coaches ==
=== Current coaching staff ===
Position	Name	Alma mater
Head Coach	David Moe	Ohio University
Assistant Coach	Jacob Strand	Mayville State University
Assistant Coach	Danny Frisby-Griffin	United States Air Force Academy
Graduate Assistant	Carson Schmidt	South Dakota State University

=== List of head coaches ===
Number	Name	Tenure
1	JoAnn Coco	1975–1976
2	Deb Singleton	1976–1977
3	Tom Weatherford	1977–1978
4	Judy Dittman	1978–1988
5	Brian Corlette	1988–1989
6	Judy Dittman	1989–1991
7	Cindy Pummell	1991–1993
8	Jeff Dittman	1993–2008
9	Joe Reints	2008–2012
10	Jeff Dittman	2012–2017
11	David Moe	2017–present

== Arenas ==
- DSU Fieldhouse (1978–present)

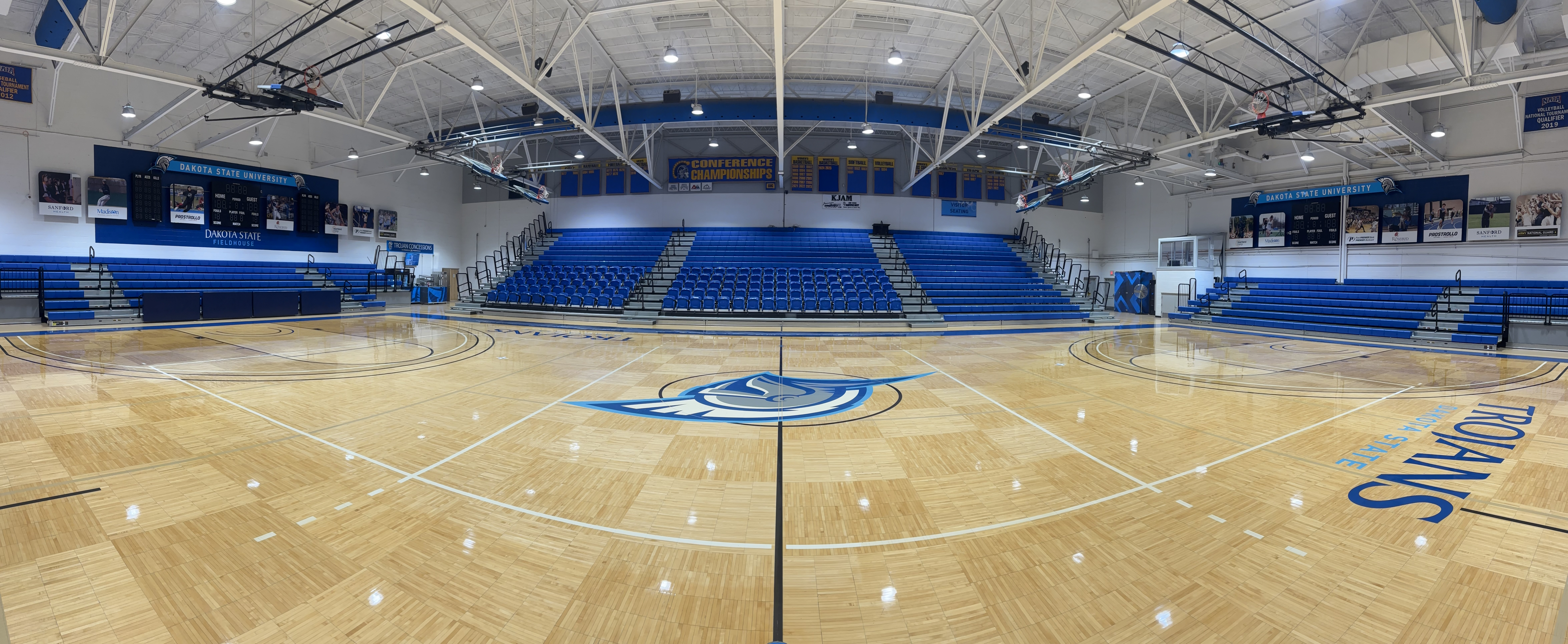
The Trojans play their home games at the DSU Fieldhouse

== Individual awards and honors ==
=== All-Americans ===
==== NAIA ====
Year	Player
1984	Monica Matthies
1985	Monica Matthies
1998	Dawn Gaffney
2000	Kathy Shypulski
2001	Kathy Shypulski
2006	Jessica VanLoy
2007	Jessica VanLoy
2008	Jessica VanLoy; Laura Tewes
2020	Jessi Giles
2021	Jessi Giles
2022	Jessi Giles
2023	Elsie Aslesen; Savannah Walsdorf
2024	Savannah Walsdorf
2025	Tabor Teel
2026	Tabor Teel

=== SDIC honors ===
All-Conference

- Tammy Nearman (1979-80)
- Deb Boomsma (1980)
- Lori Coble (1980)
- Suzanne Allard (1980)
- Donna Davis (1981)
- Sherri Heckenlaible (1980-81)
- Teresa Underberg (1980-82)
- Janis Wipf (1981-82)
- Denise Haugland (1981-83)
- Gail Sonne (1982)
- Colleen Moran (1983)
- Carol Freeman (1983-84)
- Janelle Schaefer (1984)
- Monica Matthies (1984-85)
- Julie Fiegen (1984-86)
- Monique Nelson (1985)
- Robin Hagen (1985-87)
- Julie Heinz (1985-87)
- Suzanne Mallet (1988)
- Amy Miles (1988)
- Paula Feterl (1988-90)
- Amy Jensen (1988-90)
- Amy Crissinger (1988-91)
- Lisa Gullickson (1990-92)
- Lori Oujiri (1991-92)
- Carla Burma (1992-93)
- Kris Van Bockern (1995)
- Danielle Nolte (1996)
- Kari Satter-Holman (1997-98)
- Sheila Haack (1997 and 1999-2000)
- Dawn Gaffney (1998)
- Krista Peterson (1999)
- Kathy Shypulski (2000)

=== DAC honors ===
All-Conference

- Kathy Shypulski (2001)
- Jennie Sonne (2001 and 2003)
- Jessica Honermann (2003)
- Hali McClelland (2004)
- Laura Tewes (2007-08)
- Jessica VanLoy (2006-08)
- Angela Carr (2006)
- Sara Nelson (2007)
- Maria Gengler (2008)
- Katie Bourk (2009)
- Megan Swecker (2009)

=== NSAA honors ===
All-Conference

- Alyson Drooger (2014)
- Kylie Westover (2014)
- Sharee Galbraith (2015)
- Erin Rabenberg (2015)
- BreeAna Olson (2016-17)
- Britley Plautz (2018)
- Morgan Koepsell (2020)
- Jessi Giles (2019-22)
- Elsie Aslesen (2021-23)
- Caitlin Dyer (2023)
- Savannah Walsdorf (2021-24)
- Tabor Teel (2024-25)
- Angela Slattery (2025)
- Bria Wasmund (2025)
- Lilli Mackley (2025)

Coach of the Year

- David Moe (2020–2025)

=== Frontier honors ===
Player of the Year

- Tabor Teel (2026)

First Team All–Frontier

- Tabor Teel (2026)
- Caitlin Dyer (2026)

Second Team All–Frontier

- Bria Wasmund (2026)

All–Defensive Team

- Tabor Teel (2026)
- Caitlin Dyer (2026)

All–Tournament Team

- Tabor Teel (2026)

Coach of the Year

- David Moe (2026)

== All Time Statistical Leaders ==
=== Single-game leaders ===
- Points: Julie Fiegen (49, 1986)
- Rebounds: Deb Boomsma (22, 1980)
- Assists: Julie Heinz (17, 1986)
- Steals: Jessica VanLoy (10, 2007)
- Blocks: Alyson Drooger (12, 2014)
- 3 point FG made: Kary Hootman (9, 1990)
- Free Throws made: Sheila Haack (14, 1999)

=== Single-season leaders ===
- Points: Tabor Teel (606, 2025–26)
- Rebounds: Tabor Teel (378, 2025–26)
- Assists: Julie Heinz (165, 1985–86)
- Steals: Michelle Butash (109, 1996–97)
- Blocks: Alyson Drooger (139, 2013–14)
- 3 point FG made: Kathy Shypulski (95, 2000–01)
- Free Throws made: Amy Balk (132, 2002–03)

=== Career leaders ===
- Points: Savannah Walsdorf (2,088, 2019–24)
- Rebounds: Savannah Walsdorf (1,010, 2019–24)
- Assists: Julie Heinz (528, 1983–87)
- Steals: Savannah Walsdorf (405, 2019–24)
- Blocks: Maria Gengler (264, 2004–08)
- 3 point FG made: Kathy Shypulski (248, 1997–01)
- Free Throws made: Jessi Giles (327, 2018–22)
