= 2026 NAIA women's basketball tournament =

College basketball tournament held in Iowa

- Teams: 64
- Finals site: Tyson Events Center, Sioux City, Iowa
- Champions: Marian (IN) (1st title, 1st title game)
- Runner-up: Dordt (4th title game)
- Semifinalists: Dakota State; Dakota Wesleyan
- Charles Stevenson Hustle Award: Macy Sievers (Dordt)
- Chuck Taylor MVP: Abby McNalley (Marian (IN))

The 2026 NAIA women's basketball tournament was a tournament held by the NAIA to determine the national champion of women's college basketball among its member programs in the United States and Canada, culminating the 2025–26 NAIA women's basketball season.

The tournament finals were played at the Tyson Events Center in Sioux City, Iowa, from March 19–24, 2026.

Marian (IN) won their first title over Dordt.

== Qualification ==
The tournament featured sixty-four teams in a simple single-elimination format. The first two preliminary rounds were played on regional campus sites on March 13–14, and all subsequent rounds were played from March 19–24 in Sioux City, Iowa.

== Tournament bracket ==
=== Naismith quadrant ===
First round March 13
1	Freed–Hardeman (TN)	77
16	Rust (MS)	53
8	Langston (OK)	64
9	Bethel (IN)	67
4	Loyola (LA)	87
13	Milligan (TN)	79
5	Georgetown (KY)	83
12	Taylor (IN)	58
3	Dakota State (SD)	102
14	Grand View (IA)	51
6	Concordia (NE)	76
11	Bethel (KS)	78
2	Rio Grande (OH)	80
15	Rochester Christian (MI)	68
7	Cumberlands (KY)	69
10	Indiana Wesleyan	76

Second round March 14
1	Freed–Hardeman (TN)	73
9	Bethel (IN)	64
5	Loyola (LA)	72
4	Georgetown (KY)	81
3	Dakota State (SD)	104
11	Bethel (KS)	74
2	Rio Grande (OH)	80
10	Indiana Wesleyan	86

Round of 16; March 19
1	Freed-Hardeman (TN)	68
5	Georgetown (KY)	74*
3	Dakota State (SD)	73
10	Indiana Wesleyan	65

Quarterfinals; March 21
5	Georgetown (KY)	79
3	Dakota State (SD)	85

* denotes overtime period

=== Cramer quadrant ===
First round March 13
1	Dordt (IA)	120
16	Simpson (CA)	47
8	Rocky Mountain (MT)	83
9	Southern Oregon	64
4	MidAmerica Nazarene (KS)	69
13	Saint Mary (KS)	54
5	Mid-America Christian (OK)	71
12	Olivet Nazarene (IL)	82
3	Corban (OR)	82
14	Texas A&M–San Antonio	94
6	Friends (KS)	75
11	Hastings (NE)	104
2	Saint Francis (IN)	84
15	Brescia (KY)	56
7	College of Idaho	71
10	Briar Cliff (IA)	63

Second round March 14
1	Dordt (IA)	85
8	Rocky Mountain (MT)	54
4	MidAmerica Nazarene (KS)	77
12	Olivet Nazarene (IL)	63
14	Texas A&M–San Antonio	73
11	Hastings (NE)	100
2	Saint Francis (IN)	60
7	College of Idaho	54

Round of 16; March 19
1	Dordt (IA)	75
4	MidAmerica Nazarene (KS)	53
11	Hastings (NE)	60
2	Saint Francis (IN)	67

Quarterfinals; March 21
1	Dordt (IA)	83
2	Saint Francis (IN)	62

=== Duer quadrant ===
First round March 13
1	Bethel (TN)	67
16	Talladega (AL)	51
8	Oregon Tech	52
9	Huntington (IN)	57
4	Lewis–Clark State (ID)	74
13	Hope International (CA)	65
5	Montana Tech	87
12	Nelson (TX)	75
3	Lindsey Wilson (KY)	87
14	Williams Baptist (AR)	67
6	Southeastern (FL)	87*
11	Faulkner (AL)	81
2	Dakota Wesleyan (SD)	83
15	St. Francis (IL)	55
7	Eastern Oregon	67
10	College of the Ozarks (MO)	82

Second round March 14
1	Bethel (TN)	73
9	Huntington (IN)	56
4	Lewis–Clark State (ID)	79
5	Montana Tech	67
3	Lindsey Wilson (KY)	97
6	Southeastern (FL)	68
2	Dakota Wesleyan (SD)	76
10	College of the Ozarks (MO)	53

Round of 16; March 20
1	Bethel (TN)	78
4	Lewis–Clark State (ID)	70
3	Lindsey Wilson (KY)	53
2	Dakota Wesleyan (SD)	78

Quarterfinals; March 21
1	Bethel (TN)	77
2	Dakota Wesleyan (SD)	82

=== Liston quadrant ===
First round March 13
1	Marian (IN)	96
16	Haskell (KS)	67
8	Columbia (MO)	76
9	Carroll (MT)	63
4	Evangel (MO)	79
13	USAO (OK)	74
5	William Carey (MS)	72
12	Shawnee State (OH)	74
3	Tennessee Southern	82
14	Northwestern (IA)	79
6	Spring Arbor (MI)	59
11	Indiana Tech	56
2	Campbellsville (KY)	91
15	Bryan (TN)	49
7	LSU–Shreveport (LA)	76
10	Benedictine (KS)	63

Second round March 14
1	Marian (IN)	70
8	Columbia (MO)	47
4	Evangel (MO)	67
12	Shawnee State (OH)	81
3	Tennessee Southern	67
6	Spring Arbor (MI)	80
2	Campbellsville (KY)	66
7	LSU–Shreveport (LA)	59

Round of 16; March 20
1	Marian (IN)	101
12	Shawnee State (OH)	57
6	Spring Arbor (MI)	65
2	Campbellsville (KY)	75

Quarterfinals; March 21
1	Marian (IN)	73
2	Campbellville (KY)	43

=== Semifinals and Finals ===
- Site: Tyson Events Center, Sioux City, Iowa

Semifinals; March 23
3 N	Dakota State (SD)	69
1 C	Dordt (IA)	83
2 D	Dakota Wesleyan (SD)	54
1 L	Marian (IN)	62

Finals; March 24; 7:00 p.m.
1 C	Dordt (IA)	61
1 L	Marian (IN)	73

== See also ==
- 2026 NAIA men's basketball tournament
- 2026 NCAA Division I women's basketball tournament
- 2026 NCAA Division II women's basketball tournament
- 2026 NCAA Division III women's basketball tournament
