= 2025 NAIA men's basketball tournament =

North American college basketball tournament

- Teams: 64
- Finals site: Municipal Auditorium, Kansas City, Missouri
- Champions: College of Idaho (3rd title)
- Runner-up: Oklahoma Wesleyan (1st title game)
- Charles Stevenson Hustle Award: Yashi McKenzie (Oklahoma Wesleyan)
- Chuck Taylor MVP: Samaje Morgan (College of Idaho)

The 2025 NAIA men's basketball tournament was a tournament held by the NAIA to determine the national champion of men's college basketball among its member programs in the United States and Canada, culminating the 2024–25 NAIA men's basketball season.

The tournament finals were played at the Municipal Auditorium in Kansas City, Missouri, from March 20–25, 2025.

The College of Idaho won the title, its second in three years and third overall.

== Qualification ==
The tournament featured sixty-four teams in a simple single-elimination format. The first two preliminary rounds were played on regional campus sites on March 14–15, and all subsequent rounds were played from March 20–25 at the predetermined final tournament site in Kansas City.

== Tournament bracket ==
=== Cramer quadrant ===
First round March 14
1	Arizona Christian	72
16	Westcliff	54
8	Indiana Tech	78
9	Oregon Tech	87
5	Mobile	99**
12	IU Northwest	91
4	Cumberlands	85
13	Milligan	71
6	Dalton State	67
11	Saint Mary-of-the-Woods	74
3	Ave Maria	88*
14	Xavier (LA)	84
7	Pikeville	82*
10	St. Francis (IL)	79
2	Grace	121
15	Carolina	69

Second round March 15
1	Arizona Christian	83
9	Oregon Tech	52
5	Mobile	77
4	Cumberlands	93
11	Saint Mary-of-the-Woods	89
3	Ave Maria	81
2	Grace	75
7	Pikeville	67

Round of 16; March 20
1	Arizona Christian	86
4	Cumberlands	76
11	Saint Mary-of-the-Woods	81
2	Grace	86

Quarterfinals; March 22
1	Arizona Christian	73
2	Grace	71

=== Duer quadrant ===
First round March 14
1	Freed–Hardeman	69
16	IU Southeast	57
8	Cornerstone	81
9	Spring Arbor	83
5	Indiana Wesleyan	96
12	Madonna	77
4	Life	93
13	Johnson	82
6	Montana Tech	81
11	Southern Oregon	82
3	The Master's	69
14	Dakota Wesleyan	65
7	Keiser	90
10	Faulkner	75
2	William Woods	110
15	Dillard	62

Second round March 15
1	Freed-Hardeman	71
9	Spring Arbor	69
5	Indiana Wesleyan	74
4	Life	88
3	The Master's	71
11	Southern Oregon	76
7	Keiser	78
2	William Woods	72

Round of 16; March 21
1	Freed-Hardeman	85
4	Life	71
11	Southern Oregon	83
7	Keiser	79

Quarterfinals; March 22
1	Freed-Hardeman	69
11	Southern Oregon	56

=== Liston quadrant ===
First round March 14
1	LSU–Alexandria	83
16	Stillman	76
8	Nelson	85
9	Middle Georgia State	74
5	Morningside	86
12	Hope International	77
4	Bethel (IN)	83
13	Peru State	69
6	Concordia (NE)	79
11	Bethel (KS)	76
3	Baker	72
14	Texas Wesleyan	58
7	Oklahoma Wesleyan	80
10	Mid-America Christian	69
2	Dordt	90
15	Dickinson State	58

Second round March 15
1	LSU–Alexandria	77
8	Nelson	65
4	Bethel (IN)	93
5	Morningside	84
6	Concordia (NE)	65
3	Baker	80
2	Dordt	73
7	Oklahoma Wesleyan	75

Round of 16; March 21
1	LSU–Alexandria	83*
4	Bethel (IN)	78
3	Baker	65
7	Oklahoma Wesleyan	77

Quarterfinals; March 22
1	LSU–Alexandria	87
7	Oklahoma Wesleyan	98

=== Naismith quadrant ===
First round March 14–15
1	College of Idaho	59
16	UC Merced	46
8	Friends	63
9	Florida Memorial	60
5	Central Baptist	97
12	William Carey (MS)	82
4	Langston	64
13	Saint Mary	51
6	Northwestern (IA)	99
11	Graceland	75
3	Huntington (IN)	77
14	Lourdes	51
7	Lewis–Clark State	73
10	Saint Francis (IN)	81
2	Georgetown (KY)	92
15	LSU–Shreveport	78

Second round March 15–16
1	Idaho	75
8	Friends	65
5	Central Baptist	76
4	Langston	80*
6	Northwestern (IA)	80
3	Huntington (IN)	65
2	Georgetown (KY)	83
10	Saint Francis (IN)	64

Round of 16; March 20
1	Idaho	95
4	Langston	65
6	Northwestern (IA)	70
2	Georgetown (KY)	73

Quarterfinals; March 22
1	Idaho	83
2	Georgetown (KY)	71

=== Semifinals and Finals ===
- Site: Municipal Auditorium, Kansas City, Missouri

Semifinals; March 24
1 C	Arizona Christian	45
1 N	Idaho	72
7 L	Oklahoma Wesleyan	84
1 D	Freed-Hardeman	78

Finals; March 25; 7:00 p.m.
1 N	Idaho	93
7 L	Oklahoma Wesleyan	65

* denotes overtime

== See also ==
- 2025 NAIA women's basketball tournament
- 2025 NCAA Division I men's basketball tournament
- 2025 NCAA Division II men's basketball tournament
- 2025 NCAA Division III men's basketball tournament
