= List of LSU New Orleans Privateers men's basketball head coaches =

The following is a list of LSU New Orleans Privateers men's basketball head coaches. There have been 13 head coaches of the Privateers in their 55-season history.

LSU New Orleans' current head coach is Stacy Hollowell. He was hired as the Privateers' head coach in April 2024 replacing Mark Slessinger, who left to join the coaching staff at Indiana State Sycamores men's basketball

No.	Tenure	Coach	Years	Record	Pct.
1	1969–1977	Ron Greene	8	146–65	.692
2	1977–1979	Butch van Breda Kolff	2	32–22	.593
3	1979–1985	Don Smith	6	84–83	.503
4	1985–1987	Benny Dees	2	42–16	.724
5	1987–1988	Art Tolis	1	21–11	.656
6	1988–1994	Tim Floyd	6	126–59	.681
7	1994–1997	Tic Price	3	63–27	.700
8	1997–2001	Joey Stiebing	4	57–58	.496
9	2001–2006	Monte Towe	5	70–78	.473
10	2006–2007	Buzz Williams	1	14–17	.452
11	2007–2011	Joe Pasternack	4	54–60	.474
12	2011–2024	Mark Slessinger	12	161–198	.448
13	2024–present	Stacy Hollowell	1	10–23	.303
Totals		13 coaches	55 seasons	880–718	.551
Records updated through end of 2023–24 season Source
