= 2023 NAIA men's basketball tournament =

85th North American college basketball tournament

- Teams: 64
- Finals site: Municipal Auditorium; Kansas City, Missouri
- Champions: College of Idaho Yotes (1st title)
- Runner-up: Indiana Tech Warriors (1st title game)
- Semifinalists: Georgetown Tigers (16th Final Four); OUAZ Spirit (1st Final Four)
- Winning coach: Colby Blaine (1st title)
- Chuck Taylor MVP: Charles Elzie (College of Idaho)
- Top scorer: Mason Walters (Jamestown (ND)) (95 points)

The 2023 NAIA men's basketball tournament was the 85th annual tournament held by the National Association of Intercollegiate Athletics to determine the national champion of men's college basketball among its member programs in the United States and Canada, culminating the 2022–23 NAIA men's basketball season.

College of Idaho defeated Indiana Tech in the championship game, 73–71, to win the Yotes' first NAIA men's national title.

The tournament finals were once again played at the Municipal Auditorium in Kansas City, Missouri.

== Qualification ==
After two consecutive years of expansion in 2021 and 2022, the tournament remained the same size for 2023, with 64 teams.

The tournament continued to utilize a simple single-elimination format.

The first two preliminary rounds were played on one of sixteen regional campus sites while the four final rounds, including the national championship, were played at the NAIA's long-time final tournament site in Kansas City.

== See also ==
- 2023 NAIA women's basketball tournament
- 2023 NCAA Division I men's basketball tournament
- 2023 NCAA Division II men's basketball tournament
- 2023 NCAA Division III men's basketball tournament
