= 2022 NAIA women's basketball tournament =

- Teams: 64
- Finals site: Tyson Events Center, Sioux City, Iowa
- Champions: Thomas More Saints (1st title, 2nd title game, 2nd Fab Four)
- Runner-up: Dordt Defenders (1st title game, 1st Fab Four)
- Semifinalists: Central Methodist Eagles (1st Fab Four); Southeastern Fire (1st Fab Four)
- Coach of the year: Jeff Hans (Thomas More)
- Player of the year: Stephanie Soares (The Master's)
- Charles Stevenson Hustle Award: Karly Gustafson (Dordt)
- Chuck Taylor MVP: Alexah Chrisman (Thomas More)
- Top scorer: Arleighshya McElroy (Central Methodist) (103 points)

The 2022 NAIA women's basketball tournament was the tournament held by the NAIA to determine the national champion of women's college basketball among its member programs in the United States and Canada, culminating the 2021–22 NAIA women's basketball season.

Thomas More defeated Dordt in the championship game, 77–65, the Saints' first NAIA national title. This was Thomas More's second consecutive finals appearance after losing in the 2021 title game.

The tournament finals were once again played at the Tyson Events Center in Sioux City, Iowa.

== Qualification ==
For the second consecutive year, the tournament increased in size, expanding by sixteen teams from 48 to 64 teams.

The tournament nevertheless continued to utilize a simple single-elimination format. The first two preliminary rounds were played on regional campus sites while all subsequent rounds were played at the final tournament site in Sioux City.

== See also ==
- 2022 NAIA men's basketball tournament
- 2022 NCAA Division I women's basketball tournament
- 2022 NCAA Division II women's basketball tournament
- 2022 NCAA Division III women's basketball tournament
