= 2022 NAIA men's basketball tournament =

84th North American college basketball tournament

- Teams: 64
- Finals site: Municipal Auditorium; Kansas City, Missouri
- Champions: Loyola Wolf Pack (2nd title)
- Runner-up: Talladega Tornadoes (1st title game)
- Semifinalists: Arizona Christian Firestorm (1st Final Four); Thomas More Saints (1st Final Four)
- Winning coach: Stacy Hollowell (1st title)
- Chuck Taylor MVP: Myles Burns (Loyola New Orleans)
- Top scorer: Ryan Batte (Thomas More) (114 points)

The 2022 NAIA men's basketball tournament was the 84th annual tournament held by the National Association of Intercollegiate Athletics to determine the national champion of men's college basketball among its member programs in the United States and Canada, culminating the 2021–22 NAIA men's basketball season.

Loyola New Orleans defeated Talladega in the championship game, 71–56, the Wolf Pack's second NAIA national title and first since 1945.

The tournament finals were once again played at the Municipal Auditorium in Kansas City, Missouri.

== Awards and honors ==
- Dr. James Naismith-Emil S. Liston Sportsmanship Award: Ben Limback, Concordia (Neb.)
- 2022 All-Tournament Team: Noah Schulte, Concordia (Neb.); Cash Williams, William Jessup (Calif.); Bryce Davis, Arizona Christian; Ryan Batte, Thomas More (Ky.); Jake O’Neil, College of Idaho; Jalen Galloway, Loyola (La.); Zach Wrightsil, Loyola (La.); Myles Burns, Loyola (La.); Jervay Green, Talladega (Ala.); Darryl Baker, Talladega (Ala.)

== 2022 NAIA bracket ==
=== Opening round – New Orleans, Louisiana ===
Game 1 March 11
1 | Loyola (LA) | 119
16 | Benedictine-Mesa (AZ) | 82
8 | Evangel (MO) | 72
9 | Florida College | 75

Game 2 March 12
1 | Loyola (LA) | 106
9 | Florida College | 75

=== Opening round – Montgomery, Alabama ===
Game 1 March 11
5 | Georgetown (KY) | 69
12 | Huntington (IN) | 80
4 | Faulkner (AL) | 77
13 | Florida Memorial | 66

Game 2 March 12
12 | Huntington (IN) | 80
4 | Faulkner (AL) | 88

=== Opening round – Caldwell, Idaho ===
Game 1 March 11
6 | Ottawa (AZ) | 90
11 | Tennessee Southern | 67
3 | College of Idaho | 97
14 | Vanguard (CA) | 78

Game 2 March 12
6 | Ottawa (AZ) | 52
3 | College of Idaho | 57

=== Opening round – Bourbonnais, Illinois ===
Game 1 March 11
7 | Grace (IN) | 73
10 | Cumberlands (KY) | 71
2 | Olivet Nazarene (IL) | 90
15 | Lourdes (OH) | 88

Game 2 March 12
7 | Grace (IN) | 90
2 | Olivet Nazarene (IL) | 87

=== Opening round – Lakeland, Florida ===
Game 1 March 11
1 | Arizona Christian | 76
16 | Tougaloo (MS) | 61
8 | Southeastern (FL) | 56
9 | Xavier (LA) | 57

Game 2 March 12
1 | Arizona Christian | 75
9 | Xavier (LA) | 63

=== Opening round – Wichita, Kansas ===
Game 1
5 | Bethel (KS) | 86
12 | Briar Cliff (IA) | 70
4 | Saint Francis (Ind.) | 91
13 | Northwestern (IA) | 85

Game 2
5 | Bethel (KS) | 78
4 | Saint Francis (IN) | 66

=== Opening round – Rocklin, California ===
Game 1 March 11
6 | Hope International (CA) | 85
11 | Oregon Tech | 87
3 | William Jessup (CA) | 90
14 | Warner (FL) | 78

Game 2 March 12
11 | Oregon Tech | 89
3 | William Jessup (CA) | 93

=== Opening round – Marion, Indiana ===
Game 1 March 11
7 | Southwestern (KS) | 61
10 | Indiana Tech | 70
2 | Indiana Wesleyan | 80
15 | Montreat (NC) | 65

Game 2 March 12
10 | Indiana Tech | 47
2 | Indiana Wesleyan | 70

=== Opening round – Oskaloosa, Iowa ===
Game 1 March 11
1 | William Penn (IA) | 83
16 | Bellevue (NE) | 72
8 | IU Kokomo (IN) | 82
9 | Dordt (IA) | 80

Game 2 March 12
1 | William Penn (IA) | 92
8 | IU Kokomo (IN) | 93

=== Opening round – Omaha, Nebraska ===
Game 1 March 11
5 | Concordia (NE) | 96
12 | Indiana Northwest | 78
4 | Marian (IN) | 66
13 | Freed-Hardeman (TN) | 64

Game 2 March 12
5 | Concordia (NE) | 90
4 | Marian (IN) | 67

=== Opening round – Helena, Montana ===
Game 1 March 11
6 | Jamestown (ND) | 84
11 | Lewis-Clark State (ID) | 70
3 | Carroll (MT) | 72
14 | Mount Vernon Nazarene (OH) | 58

Game 2 March 12
6 | Jamestown (ND) | 73
3 | Carroll (MT) | 66

=== Opening round – Talladega, Alabama ===
Game 1 March 11
7 | Cumberland (TN) | 79
10 | WVU Tech | 65
2 | Talladega (AL) | 79
15 | Washington Adventist (MD) | 70

Game 2 March 12
7 | Cumberland (TN) | 49
2 | Talladega (AL) | 67

=== Opening round – Park City, Kansas ===
Game 1 March 11
1 | Oklahoma Wesleyan | 71
16 | Saint Katherine (CA) | 54
8 | IU South Bend | 70
9 | Kansas Wesleyan | 86

Game 2 March 12
1 | Oklahoma Wesleyan | 67
9 | Kansas Wesleyan | 54

=== Opening round – Alexandria, Louisiana ===
Game 1 March 11
5 | LSU Shreveport | 83
12 | Missouri Baptist | 77
4 | Science & Arts (OK) | 103
13 | LSU Alexandria | 84

Game 2 March 12
5 | LSU Shreveport | 76
4 | Science & Arts (OK) | 71

=== Opening round – Waxahachie, Texas ===
Game 1 March 11
6 | SAGU (TX) | 82
11 | Central Methodist (MO) | 61
3 | Montana Tech | 71
14 | Mid-America Christian (OK) | 67

Game 2 March 12
6 | SAGU (TX) | 77
3 | Montana Tech | 63

=== Opening round – Crestview Hills, Kentucky ===
Game 1 March 11
7 | Stillman (AL) | 67
10 | Union (KY) | 65
2 | Thomas More (KY) | 81
15 | Grand View (IA) | 74

Game 2 March 12
7 | Stillman (AL) | 67
2 | Thomas More (KY) | 80

=== Championship bracket ===
Round of 16; March 17/18
1 | Loyola (LA) | 85
4 | Faulkner (AL) | 67
Naismith Bracket
3 | College of Idaho | 71
7 | Grace (IN) | 66
1 | Arizona Christian | 82
5 | Bethel (KS) | 66
Cramer Bracket
3 | William Jessup (CA) | 88
2 | Indiana Wesleyan | 84
8 | IU Kokomo | 65
5 | Concordia (NE) | 75
Duer Bracket
6 | Jamestown (ND) | 56
2 | Talladega (AL) | 67
1 | Oklahoma Wesleyan | 85
5 | LSU Shreveport | 71
Liston Bracket
6 | SAGU (Texas) | 44
2 | Thomas More (KY) | 74

Quarterfinals; March 19
1 | Loyola (LA) | 60
3 | College of Idaho | 53
1 | Arizona Christian | 90
3 | William Jessup (CA) | 79
5 | Concordia (NE) | 69
2 | Talladega (AL) | 77
1 | Oklahoma Wesleyan | 56
2 | Thomas More (KY) | 59

Semifinals; March 21
1 | Loyola (LA) | 82
1 | Arizona Christian | 70
2 | Talladega (AL) | 78*
2 | Thomas More (KY) | 77

Championship; March 22
1 | Loyola (LA) | 71
2 | Talladega (AL) | 56

== See also ==
- 2022 NAIA women's basketball tournament
- 2022 NCAA Division I men's basketball tournament
- 2022 NCAA Division II men's basketball tournament
- 2022 NCAA Division III men's basketball tournament
