= Lourdes University =

Franciscan university in Sylvania, Ohio, US

- Former names: Lourdes Junior College, Lourdes College
- Type: Private university
- Active: 1958–2026
- Religious affiliation: Roman Catholic (Franciscan)
- Students: 964 (fall 2024)
- Undergraduates: 759 (fall 2024)
- Postgraduates: 205 (fall 2024)
- Location: Sylvania, Ohio, U.S. 41°42′35″N 83°42′22″W
- Campus: 127 acres (0.51 km^{2}) Suburban
- Colors: Terracotta and Black
- Sporting affiliations: NAIA – WHAC
- Mascot: Gray Wolves
- Website: lourdes.edu
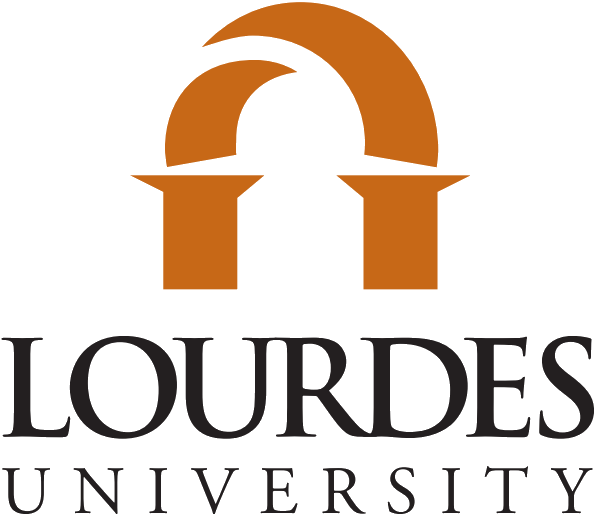

Lourdes University was a private Franciscan university in Sylvania, Ohio. Established in 1958, the university was sponsored by the Sisters of St. Francis of Sylvania. The university closed at the end of the 2025–2026 academic year, with university officials citing declining enrollment and rising costs as the reason.

== History ==
In 1916 Mother Adelaide Sandusky traveled from Minnesota to Northwest Ohio to establish a province of the Rochester Franciscans that eventually became the Sisters of St. Francis of Sylvania. For nearly 50 years, she cultivated the Sylvania Franciscan community establishing ministries including the Catholic and Franciscan institution known today as Lourdes University.

Initially created as an extension campus of the College of St. Teresa (in Winona, Minnesota), Lourdes Junior College was founded in 1958 to educate the Sisters of St. Francis. In 1964, the liberal arts institution was accredited by the Higher Learning Commission (HLC) of the North Central Association of Colleges and Schools. As time passed and there were fewer candidates in formation, Lourdes began admitting lay students with women enrolling in 1969 and men in 1975.

On February 11, 2026, Lourdes University announced it would close at the conclusion of the academic year. In August 2026, the university filed for Chapter 11 bankruptcy protection.

== Academics ==
As a Franciscan university, Lourdes provided a liberal arts curriculum with application to the professional studies. Classified among "Master's Colleges & Universities: Small Programs", Lourdes offered baccalaureate degree programs in the College of Arts and Sciences, the College of Business and Leadership, the College of Nursing, and the College of Social Sciences. Students could also pursue several pre-professional programs or a graduate degree.

== Campus ==
Lourdes University was located in the suburban city of Sylvania, Ohio.

=== Facilities ===
==== Residence halls ====
Residential students chose from 1 and 2 bedroom apartment-style living spaces in separate residence buildings.

==== Appold Planetarium ====
The Appold Planetarium featured SciDome, a single projector fulldome video system powered by Starry Night that allows real-time 3D sky simulation, fulldome shows and multi-media presentations.

==== Library ====
The Duns Scotus Library at Lourdes University was named after a 13th-century Franciscan scholar. It had a collection of over 60,000 volumes. Lourdes University was a member of the OPAL/OhioLINK, a consortium of universities sharing their library resources electronically.

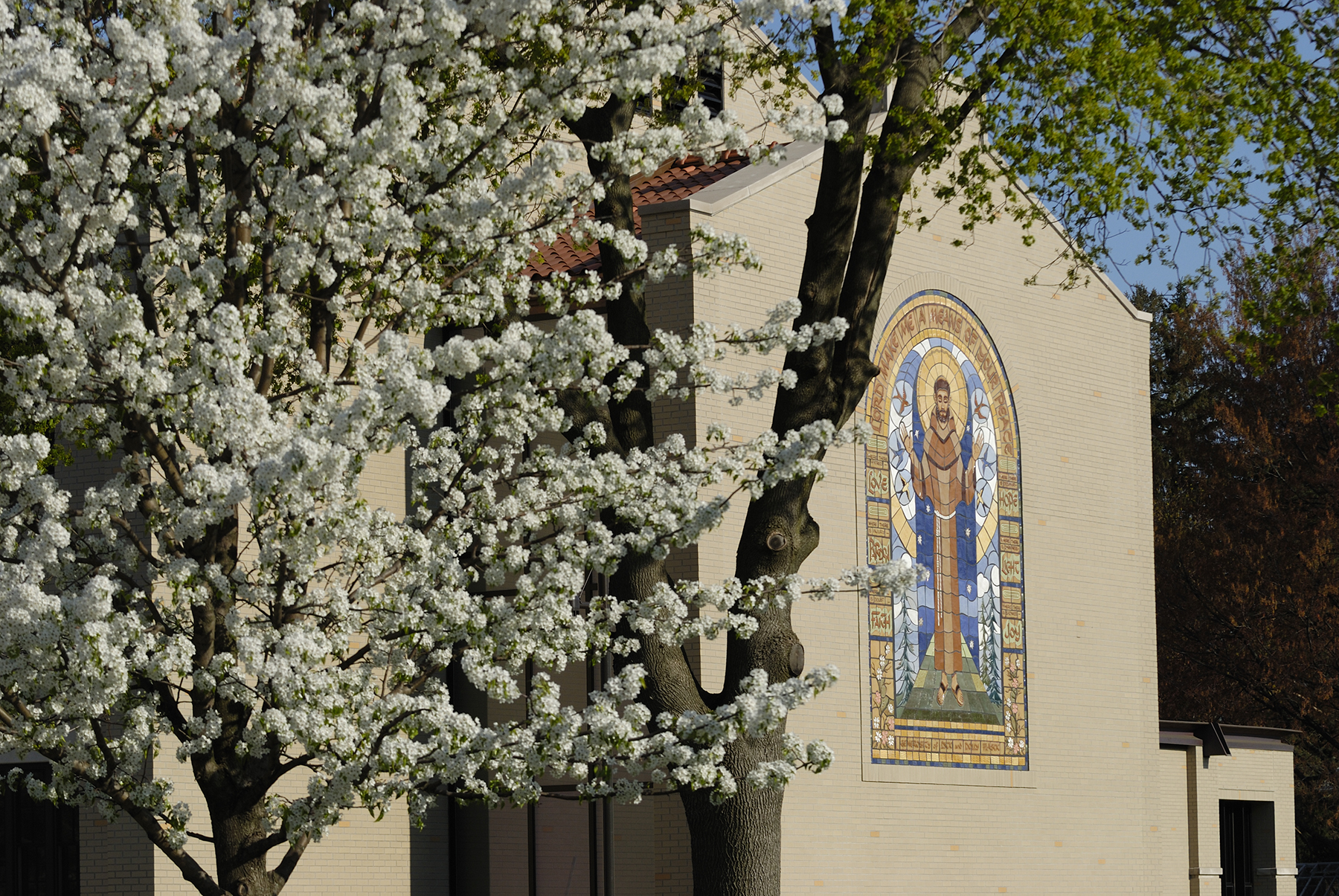
Aerial view of the campus

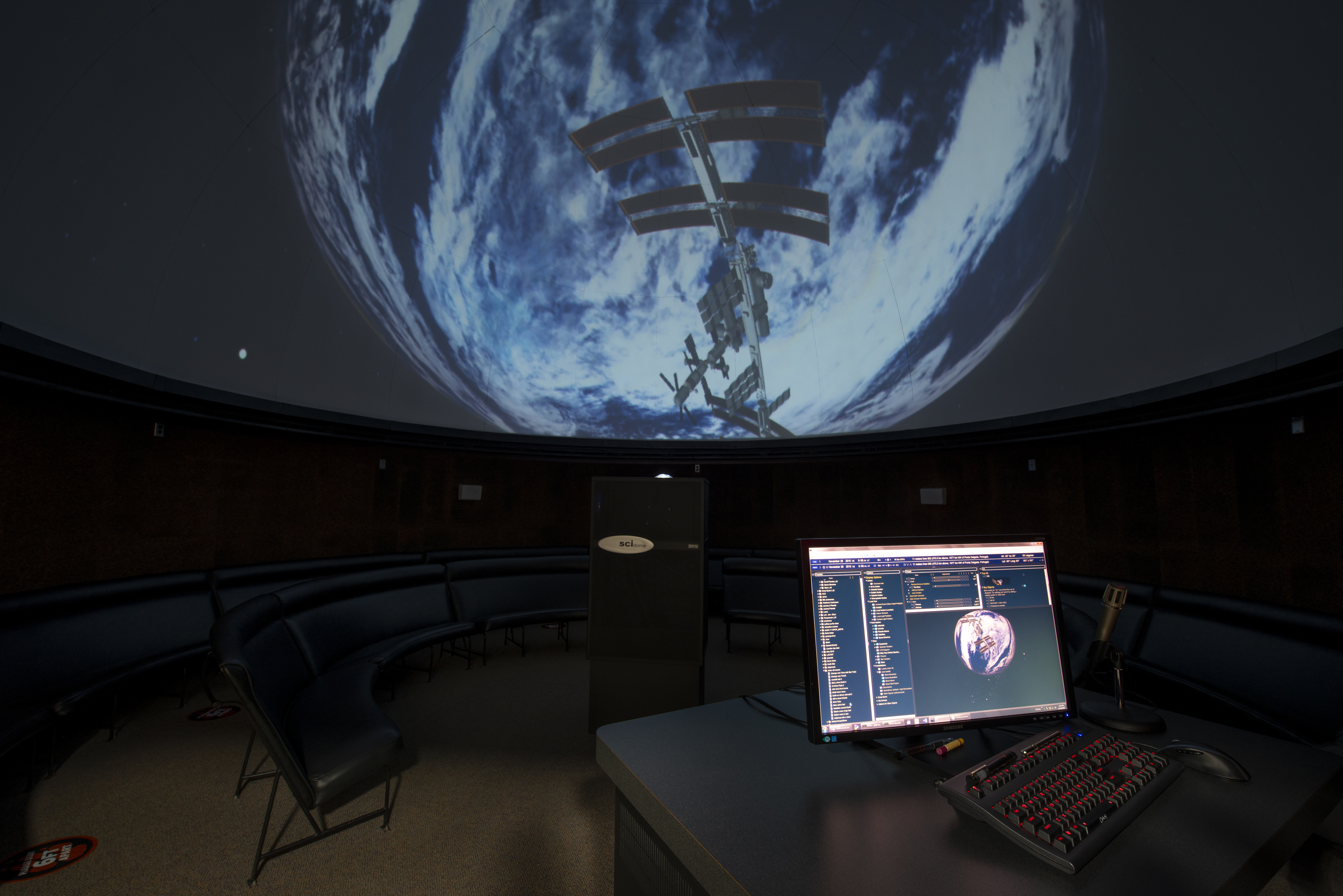
Appold Planetarium

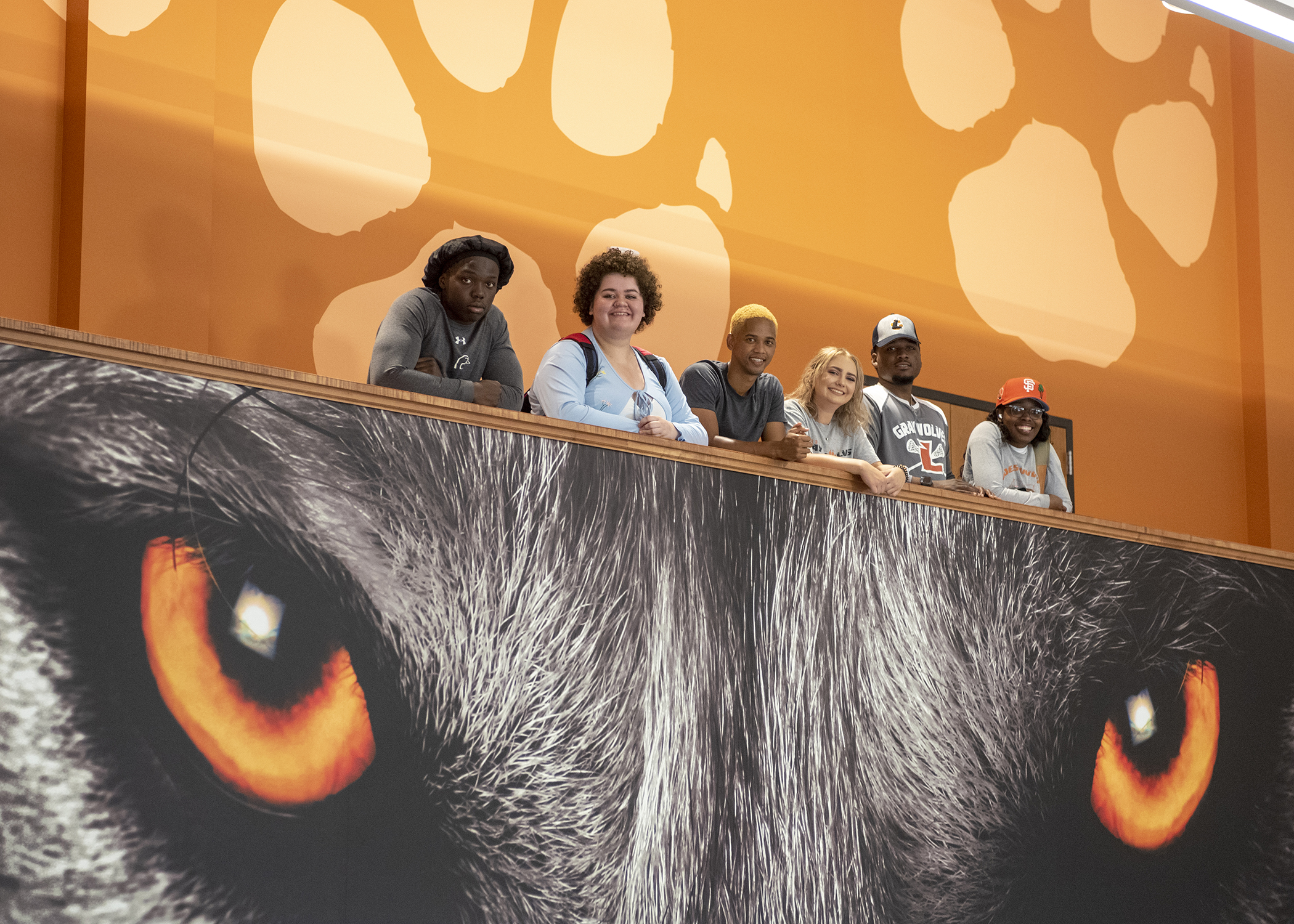
Russell J. Ebeid Recreational Center

== Scholarships ==
Lourdes University had scholarships available for academics, band, chorale, esports, campus ministry and athletics. At Lourdes, 99% of students received financial aid consisting of federal grant funds and institutional aid.

== Athletics ==
The Lourdes athletic teams were called the Gray Wolves. The university was a member of the National Association of Intercollegiate Athletics (NAIA), primarily competing in the Wolverine–Hoosier Athletic Conference (WHAC) for most of its sports since the 2011–12 academic year; while its men's wrestling team competed in the Sooner Athletic Conference (SAC). The Gray Wolves previously competed as an NAIA Independent within the Association of Independent Institutions (AII) during the 2010–11 school year (the same season when they joined the NAIA).

Lourdes competed in 25 intercollegiate varsity sports: Men's sports included baseball, basketball, bowling, cross country, golf, lacrosse, soccer, tennis, track & field, volleyball and wrestling; while women's sports included basketball, bowling, cross country, golf, lacrosse, soccer, softball, tennis, track & field, volleyball and wrestling; and co-ed sports include competitive cheer, competitive dance and eSports.

=== Colors ===
The school competed under the colors of terra cotta and black.

=== Mascot ===
The mascot was Gubi, named after the tale of St. Francis of Assisi, a Wolf and the town of Gubbio.
