= 2026 NAIA men's basketball tournament =

North American college basketball tournament

- Teams: 64
- Finals site: Municipal Auditorium, Kansas City, Missouri
- Champions: Freed–Hardeman (2nd title, 2nd title game, 7th Fab Four)
- Runner-up: Langston (2nd title game)
- Semifinalists: Benedictine Mesa; Ave Maria
- Charles Stevenson Hustle Award: Jaden Williams (Langston)
- Chuck Taylor MVP: Phil Horton (Freed–Hardeman)

The 2026 NAIA men's basketball tournament was a tournament held by the NAIA to determine the national champion of men's college basketball among its member programs in the United States and Canada, culminating the 2025–26 NAIA men's basketball season.

The tournament finals were played at the Municipal Auditorium in Kansas City, Missouri, from March 19–24, 2026.

Freed–Hardeman won the title, its second in three years.

== Qualification ==
The tournament featured sixty-four teams in a single-elimination format. The first two preliminary rounds were played on regional campus sites on March 13–14, and all subsequent rounds were played from March 19–24 at the predetermined final tournament site in Kansas City.

== Bracket ==
=== Naismith quadrant ===
First Round; March 13
1	Freed-Hardeman (TN)	92
16	Governors State (IL)	68
Henderson, Tennessee
8	Loyola (LA)	71
9	Bethel (KS)	74
5	William Penn (IA)	72
12	College of Idaho	76
Orange City, Iowa
4	Northwestern (IA)	100
13	Taylor University (IN)	63
6	Bethel (IN)	75
11	Life University (GA)	62
Georgetown, Kentucky
3	Georgetown (KY)	86
14	IU-Kokomo (IN)	73
7	Wayland Baptist (TX)	116
10	Carroll (MT)	94
Chandler, Arizona
2	Arizona Christian	71
15	Corban (OR)	50

Second Round; March 14
1	Freed-Hardeman (TN)	80
9	Bethel (KS)	72
12	College of Idaho	62
4	Northwestern (IA)	80
6	Bethel (IN)	68
3	Georgetown (KY)	85
7	Wayland Baptist (TX)	82
2	Arizona Christian	91

Round of 16; March 19
1	Freed-Hardeman (TN)	74
4	Northwestern (IA)	72
3	Georgetown (KY)	78
2	Arizona Christian	86

Quarterfinals; March 21
1	Freed-Hardeman (TN)	79
2	Arizona Christian (AZ)	78

=== Cramer quadrant ===
First Round; March 13
1	Nelson (TX)	96
16	Arkansas Baptist	81
Waxahatchie, Texas
8	Benedictine Mesa (AZ)	61
9	Southwestern (KS)	58
5	Pikeville (KY)	68
12	Faulkner (AL)	69
Columbia, Missouri
4	Columbia (MO)	74
13	McPherson (KS)	72
6	Keiser (FL)	94
11	Oregon Tech	90
Fullerton, California
3	Hope International (CA)	66
14	Georgia Gwinnett	53
7	Shawnee State (OH)	71
10	Dalton State (GA)	81
Chandler, Arizona
2	Indiana Wesleyan	71
15	St. Francis (IL)	60

Second Round; March 14
1	Nelson (TX)	94
8	Benedictine Mesa (AZ)	99
12	Faulkner (AL)	75
4	Columbia (MO)	67
6	Keiser (FL)	76
3	Hope International (CA)	79
10	Dalton State (GA)	70
2	Indiana Wesleyan	89

Round of 16; March 19
8	Benedictine Mesa (AZ)	96
12	Faulkner (AL)	88
3	Hope International (CA)	71
2	Indiana Wesleyan	65

Quarterfinals; March 21
8	Benedictine Mesa (AZ)	86
3	Hope International (CA)	75

=== Duer quadrant ===
First Round; March 13
1	Grace (IN)	88
16	Johnson (TN)	80
Winona Lake, Indiana
8	Madonna (MI)	80
9	Southeastern (FL)	91
5	William Carey (MS)	88
12	Xavier (LA)	87
Williamsburg, Kentucky
4	Cumberlands (KY)	99
13	Indiana Tech	86
6	Friends (KS)	118****
11	IU-Southeast (IN)	112
Wichita, Kansas
3	Ave Maria (FL)	84
14	Texas A&M-Texarkana	62
7	Morningside (IA)	71
10	Texas Wesleyan	83
Shreveport, Louisiana
2	LSU-Shreveport (LA)	94
15	Tougaloo (MS)	88

Second Round; March 14
1	Grace (IN)	91
9	Southeastern (FL)	75
5	William Carey (MS)	68
4	Cumberlands (KY)	95
6	Friends (KS)	102
3	Ave Maria (FL)	108
10	Texas Wesleyan	66
2	LSU-Shreveport (LA)	70

Round of 16; March 19
1	Grace (IN)	82
4	Cumberlands (KY)	74
3	Ave Maria (FL)	102
2	LSU-Shreveport (LA)	98

Quarterfinals; March 21
1	Grace (IN)	86
3	Ave Maria (FL)	99

* denotes overtime period

=== Liston quadrant ===
First Round; March 13
1	Oklahoma Wesleyan	104
16	Southern University at New Orleans	66
Bartlesville, Oklahoma
8	Montana Tech	91
9	Oklahoma City	87
5	LSU-Alexandria (LA)	78
12	Eastern Oregon	89
Lagston, Oklahoma
4	Langston (OK)	73
13	Bethel (TN)	65
6	Graceland (IA)	83
11	Lindsey Wilson (KY)	72
Huntington, Indiana
3	Huntington (IN)	58
14	Bellevue (NE)	62
7	Lewis-Clark State (ID)	80
10	The Master's (CA)	88
Billings, Montana
2	Rocky Mountain (MT)	94
15	Simpson (CA)	59

Second Round; March 14
1	Oklahoma Wesleyan	67
8	Montana Tech	46
12	Eastern Oregon	59
4	Langston (OK)	86
6	Graceland (IA)	88
14	Bellevue (NE)	95
10	The Master's (CA)	66
2	Rocky Mountain (MT)	67

Round of 16; March 19
1	Oklahoma Wesleyan	55
4	Langston (OK)	56
14	Bellevue (NE)	73
2	Rocky Mountain (MT)	78

Quarterfinals; March 21
4	Langston (OK)	60
2	Rocky Mountain (MT)	55

=== Semifinals and Finals ===
- Site: Municipal Auditorium, Kansas City, Missouri

Semifinals; March 23
1 N	Freed-Hardeman (TN)	96
8 C	Benedictine Mesa (AZ)	71
3 D	Ave Maria (FL)	69
4 L	Langston (OK)	72

Finals; March 24; 7:00 p.m.
1 N	Freed–Hardeman (TN)	76
4 L	Langston (OK)	71

== See also ==
- 2026 NAIA women's basketball tournament
- 2026 NCAA Division I men's basketball tournament
- 2026 NCAA Division II men's basketball tournament
- 2026 NCAA Division III men's basketball tournament
