= NAIA women's basketball championship =

College basketball tournament

- Current season, competition or edition: 2026 NAIA women's basketball tournament
- Sport: Basketball
- Founded: 1981
- Motto: Passion. Tradition. History.
- Divisions: 1; 2 (1992–2020)
- No. of teams: 64; 32 (1992–2020)
- Country: United States
- Venues: Rimrock Auto Arena at MetraPark; Tyson Events Center (2004–2022)
- Most recent champion: Marian (IN) (1st)
- Most titles: D-I: Oklahoma City (9); D-II: Northwestern (IA) (5); Single division: Southwestern Oklahoma State (6)
- Broadcaster: ESPN 3 (national)
- Related competitions: NAIA Men's Basketball Championships
- Website: naia.org/sports/wbkb

The NAIA women's basketball tournament has been held annually by the National Association of Intercollegiate Athletics since 1981 to determine the national champion of women's college basketball among its members in the United States and Canada.

The tournament was created to crown a women's national title for smaller colleges and universities, debuting one year before the first NCAA women's basketball tournament in 1982.

From 1992 to 2020, the NAIA sponsored two championships, one for its Division I members and another for those in its Division II. Both tournaments moved venues several times during the existences, with the final locations ultimately being Billings, Montana for Division I and Sioux City, Iowa for Division II. During this time, the NAIA tournaments featured 32 teams with the entire events contested at a single arena over the course of one week. Following renewals, the 2018 and 2019 tournaments were held in those same cities, but the 2020 tournaments were called off due to the COVID-19 outbreak.

From 2021, the two tournaments were merged back into a single event, which initially featured 48 teams in 2021 before expanding to 64 teams in 2022. Since the expansion of the tournament to its current size, the format of the event has featured teams beginning play at one of sixteen regional sites with the winners of those regionals advancing to play in a final, four-round national tournament in Sioux City.

Marian (IN) are the defending champions, winning their first national title in 2026.

== Results ==
=== Single division (1981–1991) ===
For the first eleven years that the NAIA sponsored women's basketball, it held a single national championship for all programs across its entire membership. The tournament field was initially set at eight before later expansions to 16 and 32 teams.

NAIA Women's Basketball Championship
Year	Arena	Location	Championship			Third-place game		
Year	Arena	Location	Champion	Score	Runner-up	Third place	Score	Fourth place
1981; Details	Kansas City, Missouri	Venue Unknown	Kentucky State	73–67	Texas Southern	Northern State	74–65	Azusa Pacific
1982; Details	Kansas City, Missouri	Venue Unknown	SW Oklahoma State	80–45	Missouri Southern State	Saginaw Valley State	71–61	Berry
1983; Details	Kansas City, Missouri	Venue Unknown	SW Oklahoma State (2)	80–68	Alabama–Huntsville	UMKC	85–65	Portland
1984; Details	Cedar Rapids, Iowa	Venue Unknown	UNC Asheville	72–70 (OT)	Portland	Dillard	70–66	Berry
1985; Details	Cedar Rapids, Iowa	Venue Unknown	SW Oklahoma State (3)	55–54	Saginaw Valley State	Wayland Baptist	70–64	Midland Lutheran
1986; Details	Kansas City, Missouri	Venue Unknown	Francis Marion	75–65	Wayland Baptist	Louisiana College	85–78	Georgia Southwestern
1987; Details	Kansas City, Missouri	Venue Unknown	SW Oklahoma State (4)	60–58	North Georgia	Wisconsin–Green Bay	82–56	Arkansas Tech
1988; Details	Kansas City, Missouri	Venue Unknown	Oklahoma City	113–95	Claflin	Arkansas Tech	86–81 (OT)	Wingate
1989; Details	Kansas City, Missouri	Venue Unknown	Southern Nazarene	98–96	Claflin	Arkansas Tech & St. Ambrose		
1990; Details	Jackson, Tennessee	Oman Arena	SW Oklahoma State (5)	82–75	Arkansas–Monticello	Claflin & St. Ambrose		
1991; Details	Jackson, Tennessee	Oman Arena	Fort Hays State	57–53	SW Oklahoma State	Claflin & IUPUI		

=== Division I (1992–2020) ===
The NAIA Women's Basketball National Championship Tournament was most recently held at the Rimrock Auto Arena at MetraPark in Billings, Montana, which hosted from 2017 until the return to a single division after the 2019–20 season. The NAIA was the only international intercollegiate athletic association in North America; the NAIA Division I Women's Basketball Championship was the first championship to feature a college from outside the United States in the championship game. Former member Simon Fraser University was the national DI runner-up in 1996 and 1997. Oklahoma City University has the most tournament championships with 9, and most championship game appearances with 11.

NAIA Division I Women's Basketball Championship
Year	Arena	Location	Championship			Semifinalists
Year	Arena	Location	Champion	Score	Runner-up	Semifinalists
1992; Details	Oman Arena	Jackson, Tennessee	Arkansas Tech	84–68	Wayland Baptist	St. Edward's (TX) & SW Oklahoma State
1993; Details	Oman Arena	Jackson, Tennessee	Arkansas Tech (2)	76–75	Union (TN)	Southern Nazarene & SW Oklahoma State
1994; Details	Oman Arena	Jackson, Tennessee	Southern Nazarene (2)	97–74	David Lipscomb	Auburn Montgomery & Montevallo
1995; Details	Oman Arena	Jackson, Tennessee	Southern Nazarene (3)	78–77	SE Oklahoma State	Lipscomb & SW Oklahoma State
1996; Details	Oman Arena	Jackson, Tennessee	Southern Nazarene (4)	80–79	SE Oklahoma State	Lipscomb & Union (TN)
1997; Details	Oman Arena	Jackson, Tennessee	Southern Nazarene (5)	78–73	Union (TN)	Arkansas Tech & SW Oklahoma State
1998; Details	Oman Arena	Jackson, Tennessee	Union (TN)	73–70	Southern Nazarene	Findlay & Simon Fraser
1999; Details	Oman Arena	Jackson, Tennessee	Oklahoma City (2)	72–55	Simon Fraser	Freed-Hardeman & Southern Nazarene
2000; Details	Oman Arena	Jackson, Tennessee	Oklahoma City (3)	64–55	Simon Fraser (B.C.)	Findlay & Southern Nazarene
2001; Details	Oman Arena	Jackson, Tennessee	Oklahoma City (4)	69–52	Auburn Montgomery	Lewis–Clark State & Southern Nazarene
2002; Details	Oman Arena	Jackson, Tennessee	Oklahoma City (5)	82–73	Southern Nazarene	Central State (OH) & Union (TN)
2003; Details	Oman Arena	Jackson, Tennessee	Southern Nazarene (6)	71–70	Oklahoma City	USAO & Vanguard
2004; Details	Oman Arena	Jackson, Tennessee	Southern Nazarene (7)	77–61	Oklahoma City	Brescia & Houston Baptist
2005; Details	Oman Arena	Jackson, Tennessee	Union (TN) (2)	67–63	Oklahoma City	Houston Baptist & Point Loma Nazarene
2006; Details	Oman Arena	Jackson, Tennessee	Union (TN) (3)	79–62	Lubbock Christian	The Master's & Vanguard
2007; Details	Oman Arena	Jackson, Tennessee	Lambuth	63–50	Cumberland	Union (TN) & Vanguard
2008; Details	Oman Arena	Jackson, Tennessee	Vanguard	72–59	Trevecca Nazarene	Freed-Hardeman & Union (TN)
2009; Details	Oman Arena	Jackson, Tennessee	Union (TN) (4)	73–63	Lambuth	Oklahoma Baptist & Oklahoma City
2010; Details	Oman Arena	Jackson, Tennessee	Union (TN) (5)	73–65	Azusa Pacific	Lee (TN) & Oklahoma City
2011; Details	Oman Arena	Jackson, Tennessee	Azusa Pacific	65–59	Union (TN)	Freed-Hardeman & Shawnee State
2012; Details	Frankfort Convention Center	Frankfort, Kentucky	Oklahoma City (6)	69–48	Union (TN)	Georgetown (KY) & Lubbock Christian
2013; Details	Frankfort Convention Center	Frankfort, Kentucky	Westmont	71–65	Lee (TN)	Cumberland & Freed-Hardeman
2014; Details	Frankfort Convention Center	Frankfort, Kentucky	Oklahoma City (7)	80–76	Freed-Hardeman	John Brown & Wiley
2015; Details	Independence Events Center	Independence, Missouri	Oklahoma City (8)	80–63	Campbellsville	Freed-Hardeman & Westmont
2016; Details	Independence Events Center	Independence, Missouri	MidAmerica Nazarene	49–35	Baker	Benedictine (KS) & Pikeville
2017; Details	Rimrock Auto Arena	Billings, Montana	Oklahoma City (9)	73–66	Lewis-Clark State	Campbellsville & Vanguard
2018; Details	Rimrock Auto Arena	Billings, Montana	Freed-Hardeman	76–64	Westmont	Montana Western & Wayland Baptist
2019; Details	Rimrock Auto Arena	Billings, Montana	Montana Western	75–59	Oklahoma City	Our Lady of the Lake & Freed-Hardeman
2020; Details	Rimrock Auto Arena	Billings, Montana	No tournament due to COVID-19.			

=== Single division (2021–present) ===
In 2018, the NAIA announced a new format for the 2021 tournament after the merger of Divisions I and II.

NAIA Women's Basketball Championship
Year	Arena	Location	Championship			Semifinalists
Year	Arena	Location	Champion	Score	Runner-up	Semifinalists
2021; Details	Tyson Events Center	Sioux City, Iowa	Westmont (2)	72–61	Thomas More	Indiana Wesleyan & Morningside
2022; Details	Tyson Events Center	Sioux City, Iowa	Thomas More	77–65	Dordt	Central Methodist & Southeastern (FL)
2023; Details	Tyson Events Center	Sioux City, Iowa	Clarke	63–52	Thomas More	Central Methodist & Dakota State
2024; Details	Tyson Events Center	Sioux City, Iowa	Dordt	57–53	Providence (MT)	Carroll & Cumberlands
2025; Details	Tyson Events Center	Sioux City, Iowa	Dordt (2)	82–73	Indiana Wesleyan	Bethel (TN) & Briar Cliff (IA)
2026; Details	Tyson Events Center	Sioux City, Iowa	Marian (IN)	73–61	Dordt	Dakota State & Dakota Wesleyan

== Champions ==
- Division II titles are not included in this list. Schools in italics are no longer in the NAIA.
National championships among active programs: 9, 2, 1

=== Active NAIA programs ===
Team	Titles	Years
Oklahoma City	9	1988, 1999, 2000, 2001, 2002, 2012, 2014, 2015, 2017
Dordt	2	2024, 2025
MidAmerica Nazarene	1	2016
Freed–Hardeman	1	2018
Montana Western	1	2019
Clarke	1	2023
Marian (IN)	1	2026

=== Former NAIA programs ===
Team	Titles	Years
Southern Nazarene	7	1989, 1994, 1995, 1996, 1997, 2003, 2004
SW Oklahoma State	5	1982, 1983, 1985, 1987, 1990
Union (TN)	5	1998, 2005, 2006, 2009, 2010
Westmont	2	2013, 2021
Arkansas Tech	2	1992, 1993
Kentucky State	1	1981
UNC Asheville	1	1984
Francis Marion	1	1986
Fort Hays State	1	1991
Lambuth	1	2007
Vanguard	1	2008
Azusa Pacific	1	2011
Thomas More	1	2022

== See also ==
- NAIA Division II women's basketball championship
- AIAW women's basketball tournament
- NCAA Division I women's basketball tournament
- NCAA Division II women's basketball tournament
- NCAA Division III women's basketball tournament
- NAIA men's basketball championship
- NAIA Division II men's basketball championship
