= Jordan Langs =

American football player and coach (born 1989)

Current position
- Title: Head Coach
- Team: Covenant Day Lions
- Conference: NCISAA

Biographical details
- Born: c. 1989 (age 36–37); Climax, Michigan, U.S.

Playing career
- 2008–2011: Wheaton (IL)
- Positions: Defensive back, outside linebacker

Coaching career (HC unless noted)
- 2012–2013: Wheaton (IL) (DB)
- 2014–2016: Wheaton (IL) (DC)
- 2016–2022: Indiana Wesleyan
- 2023: Iowa State (ST/RB)
- 2026–present: Covenant Day School (NC)

Head coaching record
- Overall: 31–16
- Tournaments: 2–2 (NAIA playoffs)

Accomplishments and honors

Championships
- 1 MSFA Mideast (2022)

Jordan Langs (born c. 1989) is an American college football coach and former player. Langs currently serves as the head coach for Covenant Day School, a private-Christian K-12 school in Matthews, North Carolina. He was the special teams coordinator and running backs coach for Iowa State University in 2023. He served as the head football coach at Indiana Wesleyan University from the program inception in 2016 to December 2022. In 2018, the Indiana Wesleyan Wildcats began their inaugural season of play.

== Early life and playing career ==
Langs is a native of Climax, Michigan, where he graduated from Climax-Scotts High School in 2008. He was a three-year varsity starter and a two-time all-state selection.

After high school, Langs continued his football career at Wheaton College, in Wheaton, Illinois, as a three-year starter for the Wheaton Thunder football team. His playing career spanned the years 2008 to 2011. Langs graduated in 2012 with a degree in history and social science.

== Coaching career ==
=== Wheaton ===
After graduating from Wheaton College, Langs returned to his alma mater in 2012 to serve two seasons as defensive backs coach. In 2014, Langs was named the team's defensive coordinator. Over the next three years, Langs' defenses were among the best in all of NCAA Division III football, compiling an overall record of 33–4 (.892), winning two conference titles.

=== Indiana Wesleyan ===
In 2016, Langs became the first head football coach at Indiana Wesleyan University. After two years of preparation, the Wildcats began play in the 2018 season. Langs recorded his first win as a head coach on September 8, 2018 when Indiana Wesleyan traveled to Anderson, Indiana to play the Anderson Ravens. The Wildcats dominated on both offense and defense and returned home with a 61–6 victory.

=== Iowa State ===
In 2023, Lang was hired by Iowa State University as the team's special teams coordinator and running backs coach. Lang resigned from Iowa State on February 2, 2024.

=== After college ===
Langs stated the stepped away from college coaching in order to spend more time with his family, noting the "100 to 105 hours a week" that coaching college football required. Among other jobs, he worked in sales for the Stryker Corporation. In December 2025 he accepted the head coaching job for the Covenant Day School, a private-Christian K-12 school in Matthews, North Carolina, outside Charlotte.

== Family ==
Langs and his wife, Lindsay, have four children.

== Head coaching record ==
Year	Team	Overall	Conference	Standing	Bowl/playoffs	NAIA Coaches'^{#}
Indiana Wesleyan Wildcats (Mid-States Football Association) (2018–2022)
2018	Indiana Wesleyan	7–3	0–0	N/A		
2019	Indiana Wesleyan	6–4	3–3	T–4th (MEL)		
2020–21	Indiana Wesleyan	2–3	2–3	4th (MEL)		
2021	Indiana Wesleyan	7–4	4–3	4th (MEL)	L NAIA First Round	5
2022	Indiana Wesleyan	11–2	7–0	1st (MEL)	L NAIA Semifinal	5
Indiana Wesleyan:		31–16	16–9			
Total:		31–16				
National championship Conference title Conference division title or championship game berth
^{#}Rankings from NAIA Coaches' Poll.
