= Stacy Hollowell =

American basketball coach (born 1975)

Current position
- Title: Head coach
- Team: LSU New Orleans
- Conference: Southland
- Record: 19–45 (.297)

Biographical details
- Born: August 1, 1975 (age 51); Shreveport, Louisiana, U.S.
- Education: St. Edward's ('01)

Coaching career (HC unless noted)
- c. 1998–2000: St. Edward's (SA)
- 2000–2001: Western Kentucky (VA)
- 2001–2002: St. Edward's (assistant)
- 2003–2006: Qatar (assistant)
- 2007: Manama Club
- 2007–2008: LCC International
- 2009–2010: Qatar youth
- 2011–2014: Loyola (LA) (assistant)
- 2014–2022: Loyola (LA)
- 2023–2024: Texas Southern (assistant)
- 2024–present: New Orleans / LSU New Orleans

Administrative career (AD unless noted)
- 2006: China (AS)
- 2022–2023: Ole Miss (AAD/MB)

Head coaching record
- Overall: 166–78 (.680) (NAIA); 19–45 (.297) (NCAA)
- Tournaments: 9–3 (NAIA)

Accomplishments and honors

Championships
- NAIA championship (2022); 2 SSAC tournament (2019, 2022); SSAC regular season (2022)

Awards
- NABC NAIA Coach of the Year (2022); SSAC Coach of the Year (2022)

Stacy Hollowell (born August 1, 1975) is an American basketball coach who is the current head coach of the LSU New Orleans Privateers men's basketball team. He previously coached for the St. Edward's Hilltoppers, Western Kentucky Hilltoppers, for the Qatar senior and youth national teams, Manama Sports Club, at LCC International University, for the Loyola Wolf Pack, Ole Miss Rebels and Texas Southern Tigers.

== Early life ==
Hollowell was born in Shreveport, Louisiana, and grew up in Mandeville. He attended Mandeville High School and played four years of basketball. He graduated from St. Edward's University in Texas with a degree in economics in 2001.

== Coaching career ==
Hollowell had coached Biddy Basketball teams while in high school and decided to continue coaching afterwards. While at St. Edward's, he served as a student assistant coach. He later served one season as a volunteer assistant for the Western Kentucky Hilltoppers, in 2000–01, before returning to St. Edward's as an assistant coach for the 2001–02 season.

Hollowell began coaching overseas in 2003, serving from then until 2006 as an assistant coach for the Qatar men's national basketball team. He helped the team go 111–56 in his tenure there while reaching the 2006 FIBA World Championship, which was the only appearance in their history. He also served briefly as an advanced scout for the China men's national basketball team, helping them win the basketball tournament at the 2006 Asian Games.

Hollowell also coached the Bahrain team Manama Sports Club in 2007, helping them reach the national championship while missing their top player. He then worked as the coach of the basketball team at LCC International University in Lithuania for two years (2007–2008), leading them to the playoffs both seasons. He returned to Qatar as head coach of the national youth team in 2009 and remained there through 2010, before moving back to the United States.

Hollowell joined the Loyola Wolf Pack as an assistant coach in 2011. In his first year, he helped them win the conference title and have their first 20-win season since 1948. He was promoted to head coach in 2014. He ultimately served eight years as head coach and compiled an overall record of 166–78, helping them make their first postseason appearance in 71 years and reaching the National Association of Intercollegiate Athletics (NAIA) Tournament in five of his last six years. In 2021–22, he directed them to a record of 37–1 and led them to their first national championship since 1945, as they led the country in scoring and steals. He received a number of honors for the season, including being named national Coach of the Year by the NAIA, the National Association of Basketball Coaches (NABC) and HoopDirt.com, as well as the Don Meyer NAIA Coach of the Year, LABC Louisiana Small College Coach of the Year and Southern States Athletic Conference Coach of the Year.

After the 2021–22 season, Hollowell left to be named the associate athletic director for men's basketball for the Ole Miss Rebels. After one year there, he joined the Texas Southern Tigers as assistant coach. He was hired as the head coach of the New Orleans Privateers in April 2024.

== Head coaching record ==
=== NAIA ===
Record table
Season	Team	Overall	Conference	Standing	Postseason
Loyola Wolf Pack (Southern States Athletic Conference) (2014–2022)
2014–15	Loyola (LA)	14–13	8–10	T–6th	
2015–16	Loyola (LA)	17–13	10–8	T–6th	
2016–17	Loyola (LA)	22–11	14–6	4th	NAIA Division I First Round
2017–18	Loyola (LA)	17–13	11–6	3rd	
2018–19	Loyola (LA)	23–12	13–9	T–4th	NAIA Division I Second Round
2019–20	Loyola (LA)	23–10	11–7	T–3rd	
2020–21	Loyola (LA)	15–7	6–4	2nd (West)	NAIA Quarterfinals
2021–22	Loyola (LA)	37–1	17–1	1st	NAIA Champion
Loyola (LA):		166–78 (.680)	90–51 (.638)		
Total:		166–78 (.680)			
National champion Postseason invitational champion Conference regular season champion Conference regular season and conference tournament champion Division regular season champion Division regular season and conference tournament champion Conference tournament champion

=== NCAA ===
Record table
Season	Team	Overall	Conference	Standing	Postseason
New Orleans/LSU New Orleans Privateers (Southland Conference) (2024–Present)
2024–25	New Orleans	4–27	2–18	12th	
2025–26	New Orleans	15–18	12–10	T-5th	
2026–27	LSU New Orleans	0–0	0–0		
New Orleans/LSU New Orleans:		19–45 (.297)	14–28 (.333)		
Total:		19–45 (.297)			
National champion Postseason invitational champion Conference regular season champion Conference regular season and conference tournament champion Division regular season champion Division regular season and conference tournament champion Conference tournament champion
