= 2023 NAIA women's basketball tournament =

- Teams: 64
- Finals site: Tyson Events Center, Sioux City, Iowa
- Champions: Clarke Pride (1st title, 1st title game, 1st Fab Four)
- Runner-up: Thomas More Saints (1st title game, 3rd Fab Four)
- Semifinalists: Central Methodist Eagles (2nd Fab Four); Dakota State Trojans (1st Fab Four)
- Charles Stevenson Hustle Award: Nicole McDermott (Clarke)
- Chuck Taylor MVP: Tina Uble (Clarke)

The 2023 NAIA women's basketball tournament was the tournament held by the NAIA to determine the national champion of women's college basketball among its member programs in the United States and Canada, culminating the 2022–23 NAIA women's basketball season.

Clarke defeated defending champions Thomas More in the championship game, 63–52, the Pride's first NAIA national title. This was additionally Thomas More's third consecutive finals appearance and their final one before departing for NCAA Division II.

The tournament finals were once again played at the Tyson Events Center in Sioux City, Iowa.

== Qualification ==
The tournament continued to feature sixty-four teams and utilize a simple single-elimination format. The first two preliminary rounds were played on regional campus sites while all subsequent rounds were played at the final tournament site in Sioux City.

== See also ==
- 2023 NAIA men's basketball tournament
- 2023 NCAA Division I women's basketball tournament
- 2023 NCAA Division II women's basketball tournament
- 2023 NCAA Division III women's basketball tournament
