= Lourdes Gray Wolves =

College sport team in Ohio

- University: Lourdes University
- NAIA: Division I
- Conference: WHAC (primary); Sooner (men's wrestling)
- Location: Sylvania, Ohio
- Varsity teams: 25 (11 men's, 11 women's, 3 co-ed)
- Basketball arena: Russell J. Ebeid Recreation Center
- Baseball stadium: Mercy Field
- Soccer stadium: Wildcat Stadium
- Nickname: Gray Wolves
- Colors: Terracotta, white, and black
- Mascot: Gubi the Gray Wolf
- Fight song: Gray Wolf Spirit
- Website: lourdesathletics.com
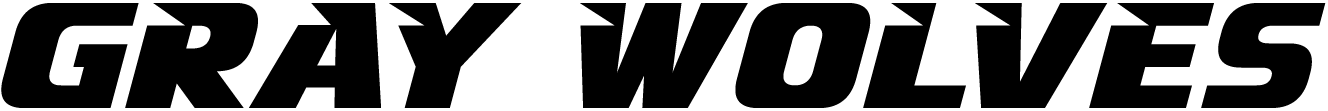

The Lourdes Gray Wolves were the athletic teams that represented Lourdes University, located in Sylvania, Ohio, in intercollegiate sports as a member of the National Association of Intercollegiate Athletics (NAIA), primarily competing in the Wolverine–Hoosier Athletic Conference (WHAC) for most of its sports since the 2011–12 academic year; while its men's wrestling team competed in the Sooner Athletic Conference (SAC). The Gray Wolves previously competed as an NAIA Independent within the Association of Independent Institutions (AII) during the 2010–11 school year (the same season when they joined the NAIA).

All athletic programs ceased operations with the closure of the university at the end of the 2025-2026 academic year.

== Varsity teams ==
Lourdes competed in 24 intercollegiate varsity sports: Men's sports included baseball, basketball, bowling, cross country, golf, lacrosse, soccer, tennis, track & field, volleyball and wrestling; while women's sports included basketball, bowling, cross country, golf, soccer, softball, tennis, track & field, volleyball and wrestling; and co-ed sports include competitive cheer, competitive dance and eSports.

== History ==
On January 16, 2008, Lourdes College announced that they would be called the Gray Wolves. An athletic identity was also revealed. In July 2009, Roseanne Gill-Jacobson was named the first athletic director in Lourdes College history. In August 2010, the first home game for any athletic team at Lourdes College was held. The women's volleyball team was victorious over Ohio State University at Marion. On December 19, 2012, it was announced that Lourdes had added men's and women's lacrosse, as well as competitive cheer and dance as sports.

=== Facilities ===
- Russell J. Ebeid Recreation Center – Men's Basketball, Women's Basketball, Men's Volleyball, Women's Volleyball, Esports
- Franciscan Center Gymnasium - Wrestling, Cheerleading
- Wildcat Stadium - Lacrosse, Soccer
- Mercy Field – Baseball
- Gray Wolf Field/Pacesetter Park - Softball
- Sylvania Country Club – Men's Golf, Women's Golf
