= Dordt University =

College in Sioux Center, Iowa, U.S.

- Former names: Midwest Christian Junior College (1955–1956); Dordt College (1956–2019)
- Motto: Soli Deo Gloria
- Motto in English: Glory to God alone
- Type: Private university
- Established: 1955
- Religious affiliation: Christian Reformed Church
- Academic affiliations: CCCU
- Endowment: US $83.8 million (2025)
- President: Erik Hoekstra
- Faculty: 80 Full Time
- Students: 2,077
- Location: Sioux Center, Iowa, U.S. 43.0833°N 96.1671°W
- Campus: Rural 115 acres (0.47 km^{2})
- Colors: Black & Gold
- Nickname: Defenders
- Sporting affiliations: NAIA – GPAC
- Website: www.dordt.edu
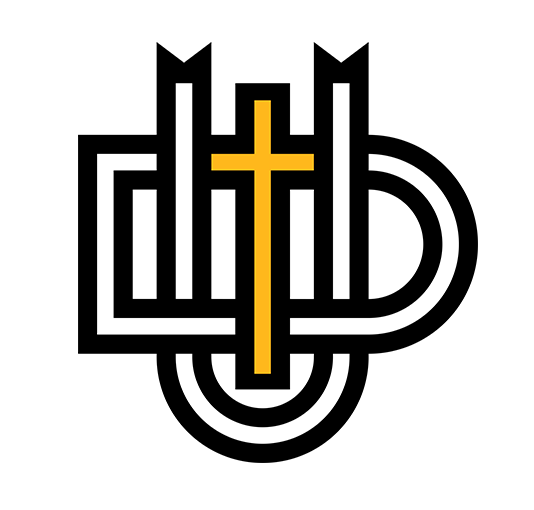

Dordt University is a private evangelical Christian university in Sioux Center, Iowa. It was founded in 1955 and is affiliated with the Christian Reformed Church in North America. The university name is a reference to the Synod of Dordt (Dordrecht).

Dordt annually enrolls about 1,500 students. The university offers 90 programs of study that lead to Associate of Arts, Bachelor of Arts, Bachelor of Science in Engineering, Bachelor of Social Work, Bachelor of Science in Nursing, and Master of Education degrees.

== History ==
Dordt University was founded as Midwest Christian Junior College in 1953. In 1954, a group of men from local Christian Reformed Churches in Iowa, South Dakota and Minnesota agreed to establish the college in Sioux Center. It was tentatively referred to as Midwest Christian Junior College, and the first classes were held at the college in the fall of 1955 with about 40 students.

In April 1956, the name was changed to Dordt College. This name was chosen to honor a historic 17th century Reformed church meeting called the Synod of Dordt that took place in the Netherlands in 1618–1619.

[T]he name 'Dordt' will constantly remind us of the heritage in which we are rooted and the goals we should strive for. It will give us a constant source of inspiration to continue in the faith of the fathers. It will tell all people everywhere just exactly what we are and what we stand for."
Dordt College, as no other name, will express the distinctiveness of our school and the purpose for which it was established, The Spirit of Dordt, its strivings to seek the glory of God in all its thinking ... its efforts to be faithful to the Word of God in every detail, summarizes all the things our school should strive for ..."

The first graduating class consisted of 18 students in 1957. The first students to earn B.A. degrees graduated in 1965. The college changed its name to Dordt University on May 13, 2019.

== Academics ==
Dordt offers over 90 programs of study with over 40 majors and 11 pre-professional programs of study. The core is drawn from various academic disciplines such as language, natural science, and social science.

Dordt is accredited to grant bachelor and Master of Education degrees by the Higher Learning Commission. Furthermore, the engineering program is ABET accredited, the nursing program is accredited by the National League for Nursing and the Iowa Board of Nursing and the social work program is accredited by the Council on Social Work Education.

Dordt offers more than 25 off-campus study opportunities in countries around the world through its affiliation with the Council for Christian Colleges and Universities. These countries include Australia, China, France, Ghana, Honduras, Hungary, Mexico, the Netherlands, Spain, Uganda, and the United Kingdom. Off-campus programs also exist for Chicago, Washington D.C., and Los Angeles.

Ninety-eight percent of students receive financial aid in the form of scholarships, grants, loans, and work-study opportunities. The university awards scholarships based on academic potential and performance (e.g., the Kuyper Honors program), activities (e.g., sports, theater, music), and demonstrated financial need. Over $18.5 million is awarded in financial aid annually, thanks in large part to private donors and alumni.

== Campus ==
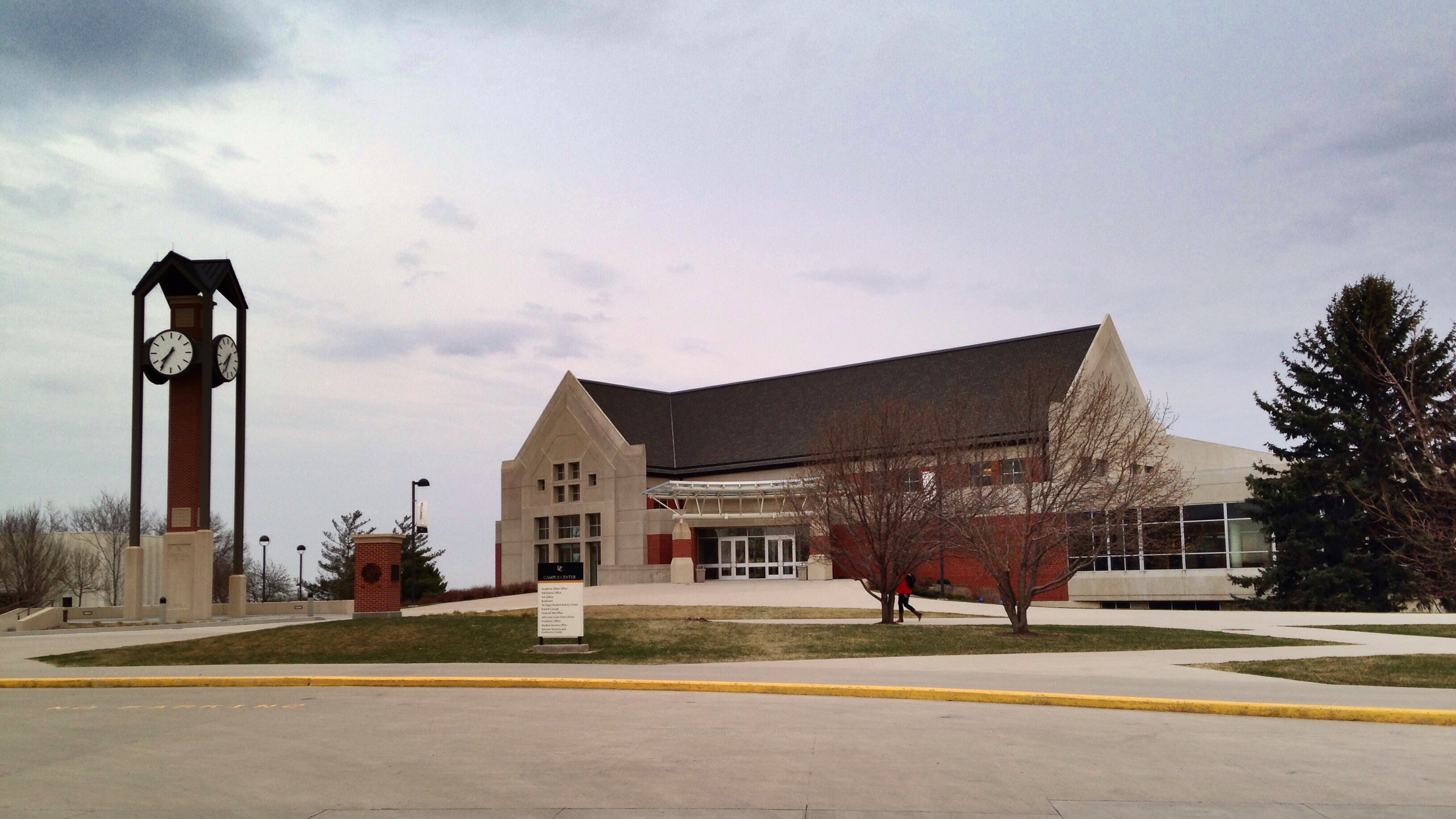
The Campus Center in 2014.

The university is located in Sioux Center, Iowa, about 45 miles (72 km) north of Sioux City, and 55 miles (89 km) southeast of Sioux Falls, SD. The campus covers a 115-acre (47 ha) area and includes 25 buildings, eleven for student housing.

The hub of the campus is the Campus Center. The 70,000-square-foot (6,500 m^{2}) facility was constructed in 2002 at a cost of $12.5 million and is open continuously during the academic year. The entry level consists of a campus store, an art gallery, meditation rooms, and a student lounge. The upper level features enhanced-technology classrooms, conference rooms, and various offices. The lower-level houses an activity center, a dining area, a snack bar, and Campus Health. The basement features a recording studio and a game room complete with a four-lane regulation-size bowling alley, as well as foosball and pool tables.

=== Academic facilities ===
The campus center is the John and Louise Hulst Library, which houses a collection of more than 300,000 book volumes, 16,000 print journal volumes, and 163,000 microtext units. The library subscribes to more than 600 journals, magazines, and newspapers, and has electronic access to another 10,000 titles. In addition to providing print and electronic resources, the library serves the campus media needs by offering checkout availability of various media equipment. The library has a significant collection of curriculum and children's literature materials housed in the Learning Resource Center. Other specialized collections include the Dordt University Archives and the Dutch Memorial Collection.

The Science and Technology Center at has 180- and 80-seat lecture halls, a greenhouse, laboratories, general-use classrooms, and various science departmental offices. There are laboratories for organic chemistry, physical chemistry and physics. It also houses agriculture facilities for animal science and agronomy labs. The engineering wing includes labs for mechanical engineering, electronics, electrical engineering, and computer-aided design. The Science and Technology Center is connected to the Campus Center via a sky walk, which was constructed in 2017.

=== B. J. Haan Auditorium ===
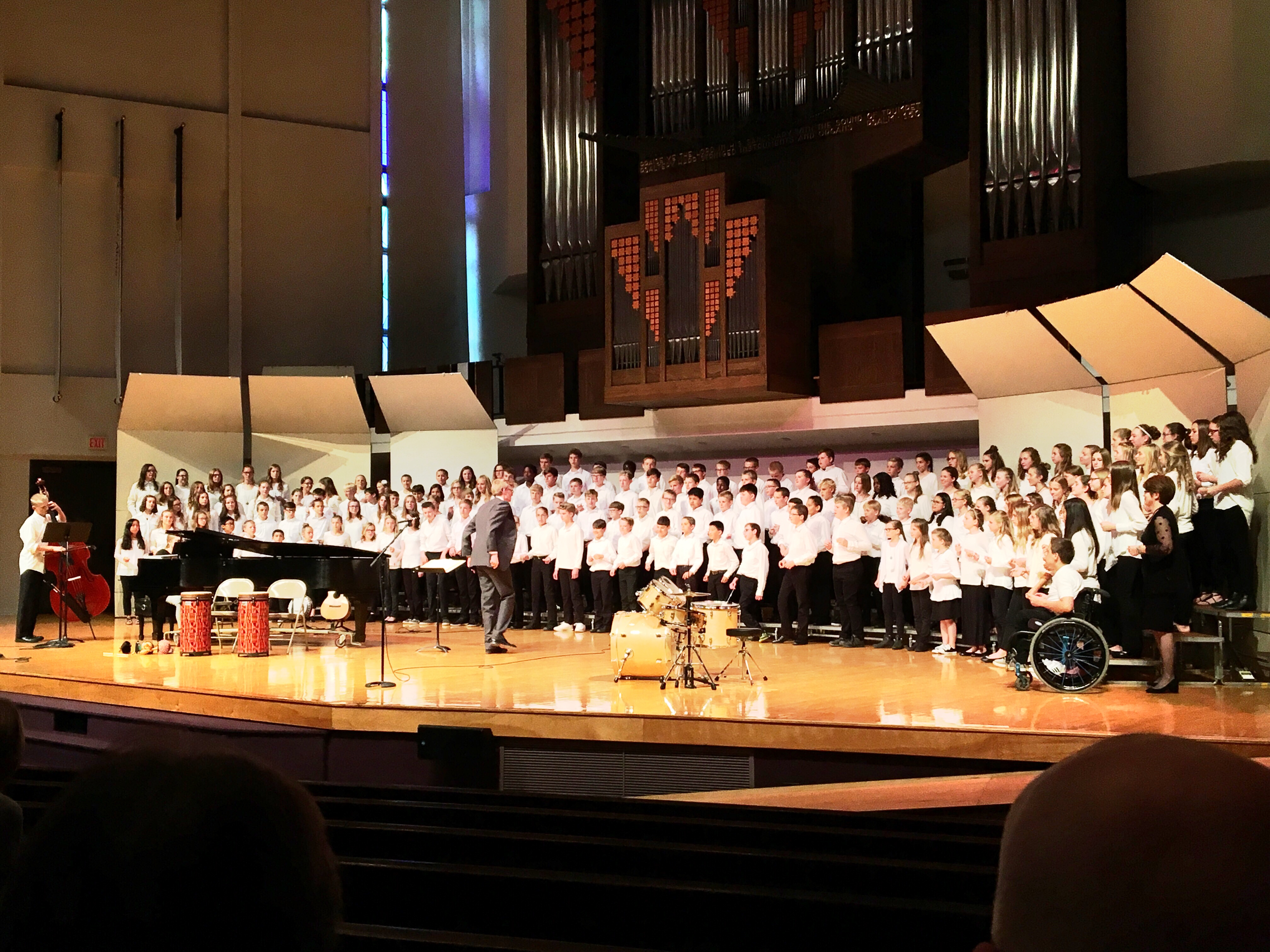

The B. J. Haan Auditorium seats approximately 1,500 people and is used for chapel services, concerts, organ recitals, and other regional events. Convocation and commencement exercises are also held in "the Beej", as it is called by students. The auditorium features a three-manual, tracker-action Casavant Frères organ with 37 stops, 57 ranks, and 2,833 pipes.

The auditorium is adjoined by the Music Building, which also has rehearsal rooms, studios and classrooms, vocal and instrumental practice rooms, and music faculty offices. Its mezzanine also houses the International Association for the Promotion of Christian Higher Education.

The auditorium was the site of a campaign rally by candidate Donald Trump on January 23, 2016, during the race for the 2016 Iowa Republican presidential caucuses.

=== Athletic facilities ===
The campus recreation center hosts the Health, Physical Education, and Recreation (HPER) departmental facilities and the athletics offices. The Rec Center which opened in 1997 and was renovated in 2022 includes basketball, volleyball and racquetball courts, an aerobics room, a weight room, golf practice facility, a 200-meter indoor track, and a batting cage.

Connected to the Rec Center is the DeWitt Gymnasium, home of the Defenders' men's and women's basketball and volleyball teams. It opened in 1968 with an addition in 1979 and a remodel in 2005, with a capacity of 2,000. DeWitt Gymnasium is known as a tough place to play for opposing teams due to the fans' proximity to the court and the lowness of the wood ceiling. A renovation to locker rooms and offices between the Rec Center and DeWitt Gymnasium was started in the spring/summer of 2025. A renovation inside the gym will take place during the spring/summer of 2026 which will add a new entry area, lobby, walkways, band seating, and an upgraded courtyard.

The All Seasons Center was built in 2004 and contains an NHL-sized hockey rink, waterslides, a lap pool, and both indoor and outdoor family aquatic pools. This US$9 million facility is shared by Dordt College and the city of Sioux Center and received the Iowa League of Cities 2002 All-Star Community Award. The arena plays host to the Defenders Ice Hockey program.

== Athletics ==
The Dordt athletic teams are called the Defenders, which originated from the school being touted as a "Defender of the Christian faith" by then-president B. J. Haan. The university is a member of the National Association of Intercollegiate Athletics (NAIA), primarily competing in the Great Plains Athletic Conference (GPAC) since the 2000–2001 academic year. The Defenders previously competed in the defunct South Dakota Intercollegiate Conference (SDIC) from 1995–96 to 1999–00.

Dordt competes in 18 intercollegiate varsity sports: Men's sports include baseball, basketball, cross country, football, golf, ice hockey, soccer, track & field and volleyball; while women's sports include basketball, cheerleading, cross country, dance, golf, soccer, softball, track and field, and volleyball.

=== Cross country ===
The men's team won the 2022 NAIA Cross Country Championships with a final score of 97 points. This was the first national championship for any athletic program in Dordt history.

=== Basketball ===
In 2014, the Defenders set a record for points scored by both teams in the NAIA National Basketball Tournament.

In 2024, the Defenders women's team claimed their first national title at the NAIA women's basketball championship. against University of Providence with a score of 57–53. Again in 2025 the team successfully defended their title in a game against Indiana Wesleyan with a score of 82–73. Macy Sievers was named "Player of the Tournament" both years.

=== Club sports ===
Dordt University no longer sponsors any club programs.

=== Ice hockey ===
Ice hockey is recognized as an NAIA varsity sport at Dordt. However, Dordt University's men's Ice Hockey team competes at the American Collegiate Hockey Association Division III level in the MACHA Silver West conference. Most of the teams at this level are club sports teams.
