= Tyson Events Center =

Multi-purpose arena in Sioux City, Iowa

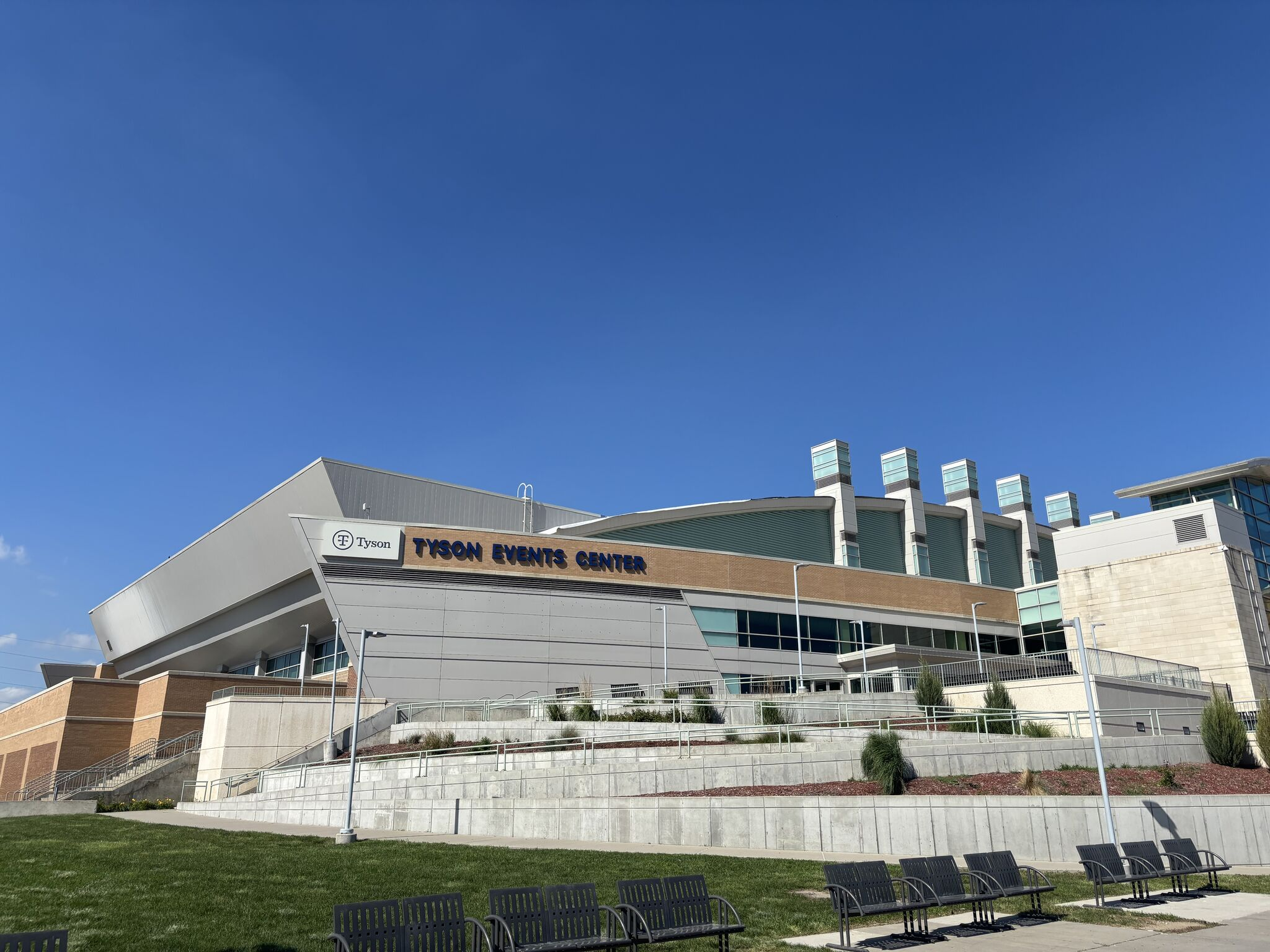
- Tyson Events Center in 2025
- Interactive map of Tyson Events Center
- Former names: Gateway Arena (2003-2019)
- Location: 401 Gordon Drive, Sioux City, Iowa, U.S.
- Coordinates: 42.49146113935062°N 96.40723400273797°W
- Owner: City of Sioux City
- Operator: Oak View Group
- Capacity: (Fleet Farm Arena): Concerts: 10,000; Basketball: 6,813, with standing room for at least 9,500; Hockey: 6,731, with standing room for at least 9,500; Indoor football: 6,941, with standing room for at least 9,500
- Surface: Multi-surface

Construction
- Groundbreaking: April 30, 2002
- Opened: December 17, 2003
- Cost: $53 million ($92.8 million in 2025 dollars)
- Architects: Ellerbe Becket; FEH Associates
- Services engineers: KJWW Engineering Consultants, P.C.
- General contractor: Mortenson/Klinger

Tyson Events Center is a multipurpose arena located in Sioux City, Iowa. The seating bowl of the facility is the Fleet Farm Arena, previously known as Gateway Arena. The venue was announced in September 2000 and broke ground in April 2002. The venue officially opened in December 2003. The arena has three spectator levels: one suite level and two general seating levels named the 100 level and the 200 level, respectively. Its listed maximum capacity is 10,000. The venue is owned by Sioux City and is operated by Oak View Group.

As part of its construction, the Tyson Events Center was built adjoining the Sioux City Municipal Auditorium, Sioux City's previous arena, which seated 3,500. The two buildings are directly connected to each other and share some facilities. The northwest corner of the auditorium is inside of the seating bowl of the Tyson Events Center.

The venue is home to the Sioux City Musketeers of the United States Hockey League (USHL) and the Sioux City Bandits of the National Arena League (NAL). It is the host site of the NAIA National Championships for Women's Volleyball and Women's Basketball.

== History ==
In September 2000, it was announced that Sioux City would be developing an arena to replace the Sioux City Municipal Auditorium. Plans were later expanded in December, and the project was formally announced that same year. In 2001, IBP, Inc. and its parent, Tyson Foods, purchased the naming rights for the event center. Additionally the naming rights to the arena within the events center were purchased by Gateway, Inc. The arena officially broke ground on April 30, 2002 with construction beginning shortly after. The Tyson Events Center officially opened on December 17, 2003.

In 2007, Acer Inc. acquired Gateway but retained the Gateway Arena naming rights until the rights expired in June 2019. On September 30, 2019, retail chain Fleet Farm took over as naming rights partner under an eight-year deal which would brand the arena as Fleet Farm Arena.

In 2018, the venue, which had been operated by the City of Sioux City, went under management by Philadelphia-based venue management firm Spectra. In November 2021, Spectra was acquired by Oak View Group, which continues to manage the facility.

In 2026, Tyson Foods agreed to relinquish the naming rights of the venue, which it previously held in perpetuity.

== Notable events ==
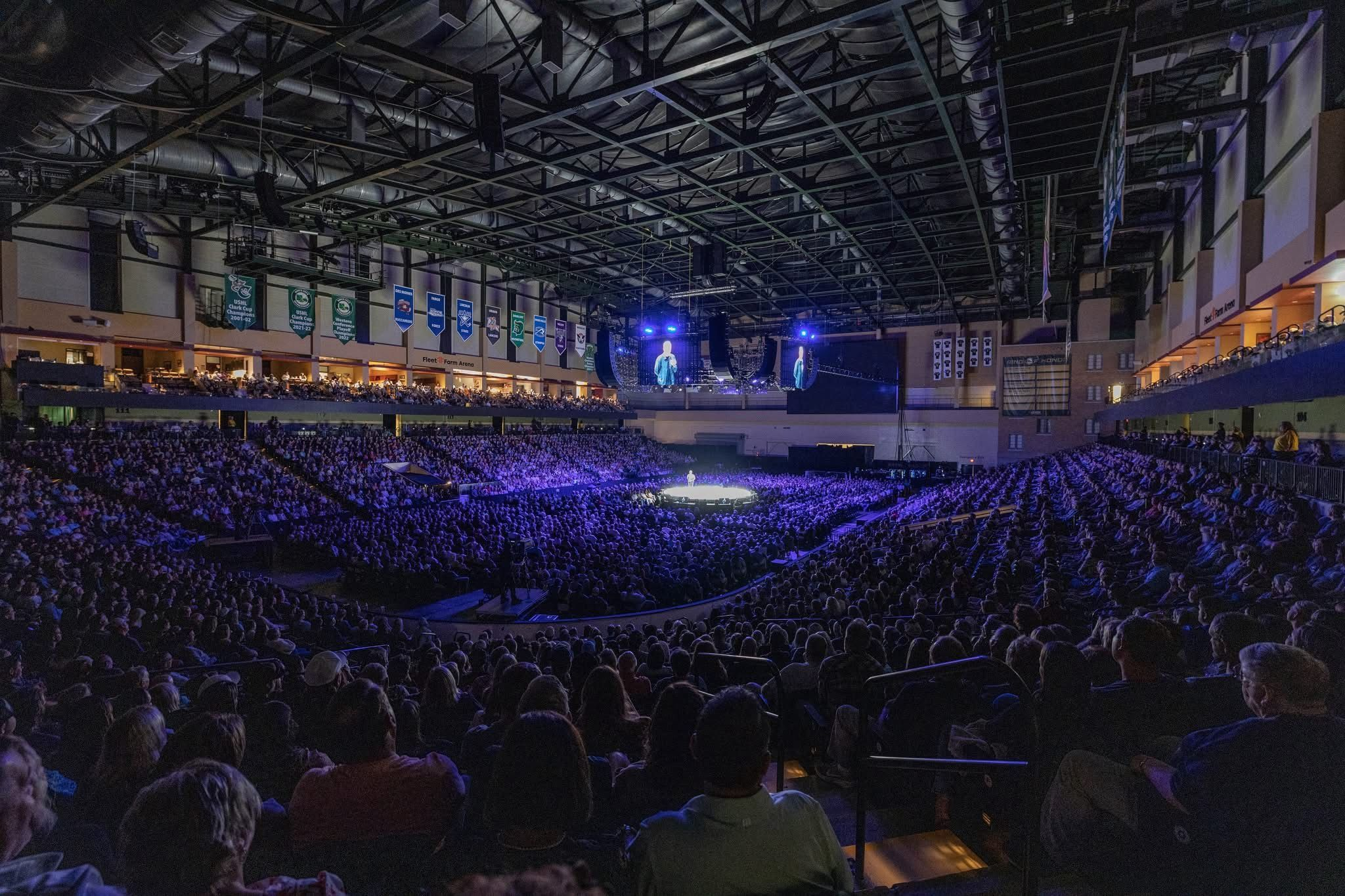
Comedian Nate Bargatze performing at the Tyson Events Center, September 2025

=== Concerts ===
The arena has hosted numerous concerts, by artists such as Aerosmith, Dolly Parton, Elton John,Taylor Swift, Britney Spears, Cher, Trace Adkins, Kenny Chesney, Rascal Flatts, Fleetwood Mac, Kiss, Cheap Trick, Alan Jackson, Nickelback, 311, Neil Diamond, Carrie Underwood, Little Big Town, Ozzy Osbourne, Rob Zombie, Buckcherry, The Offspring, Brad Paisley, Miranda Lambert, Whitesnake, Papa Roach and Creed.

=== Comedians ===
The venue has hosted notable comedians such as Nate Bargatze, Kevin Hart, Gabriel Iglesias, and Larry the Cable Guy.

=== Professional Wrestling ===
The site has hosted World Wrestling Entertainment on numerous occasions, including a live un-televised event on September 25, 2004, followed by a televised SmackDown on May 17, 2005; and four televised Raw programs on July 10, 2006, February 5, 2007, January 12, 2009 along with an ECW taping the same night, and Raw on July 1, 2013. There was another non-televised show on August 16, 2009. It has also hosted TNA Wrestling Live on June 4, 2010. In December 2014, there was a SmackDown televised event featuring the Immortal Hulk Hogan acting as an authority figure for the night.

In 2016 there was a WWE Live event (Smackdown) non-televised event featuring AJ Styles vs Dean Ambrose for the WWE Championship, The Usos vs Ryhno and Heath Slater for the Smackdown Tag Team Championships, The Hype Bros and American Alpha vs The Ascension and the Vaudevillians, Kalisto vs Tyler Brezze, The Miz vs Apollo Crews, Natalya and Carmela vs Emma and Naomi, Kane vs Bray Wyatt and Luke Harper and Alexa Bliss vs Becky Lynch for the Smackdown Women's Championship.

Most recently on April 22, 2019, the arena hosted non-televised WWE Live: Smackdown. The event featured 7 Matches including Charlotte Flair defeating Bayley via her signature Figure 8, Roman Reigns defeating Elias, WWE Intercontinental Champion Finn Balor defeating Mustafa Ali. The main event featured WWE Champion Kofi Kingston defeating Randy Orton to retain thanks to assistance from Kevin Owens who gave Orton a Stone Cold Stunner while the referee was knocked out and Kingston finished with his signature Trouble in Paradise.

WWE was scheduled to return to the arena on December 17, 2019 for a RAW taping that would air on December 23, 2019 but was cancelled by WWE for “scheduling conflicts” but was actually due to low ticket sales.

=== Bull Riding ===
The venue regularly hosts rodeos and bull rides, including PRCA-sanctioned Rodeos and Cinch World's Toughest Rodeo.

=== Motorsports ===
The venue has hosted many monster truck events, including Hot Wheels Monster Trucks Live and multiple occurrences of Monster Truck Nationals.

It has also hosted ice racing.

=== Other events ===
President George W. Bush spoke at the Tyson Events Center during his re-election campaign in 2004.

== See also ==
- Sioux City Municipal Auditorium
