= Indiana Wesleyan Wildcats =

- University: Indiana Wesleyan University
- Conference: Crossroads (primary), MSFA (football), Mid-South (men's and women's swimming)
- NAIA: NAIA
- Athletic director: Deane Webb
- Location: Marion, Indiana
- Varsity teams: 23
- Football stadium: Wildcat Stadium
- Basketball arena: Luckey Arena
- Baseball stadium: Wildcat Park
- Soccer stadium: Wildcat Field
- Other venues: Troyer Fieldhouse
- Mascot: Wesley the Wildcat
- Nickname: Wildcats
- Colors: Red and Gray
- Website: iwuwildcats.com
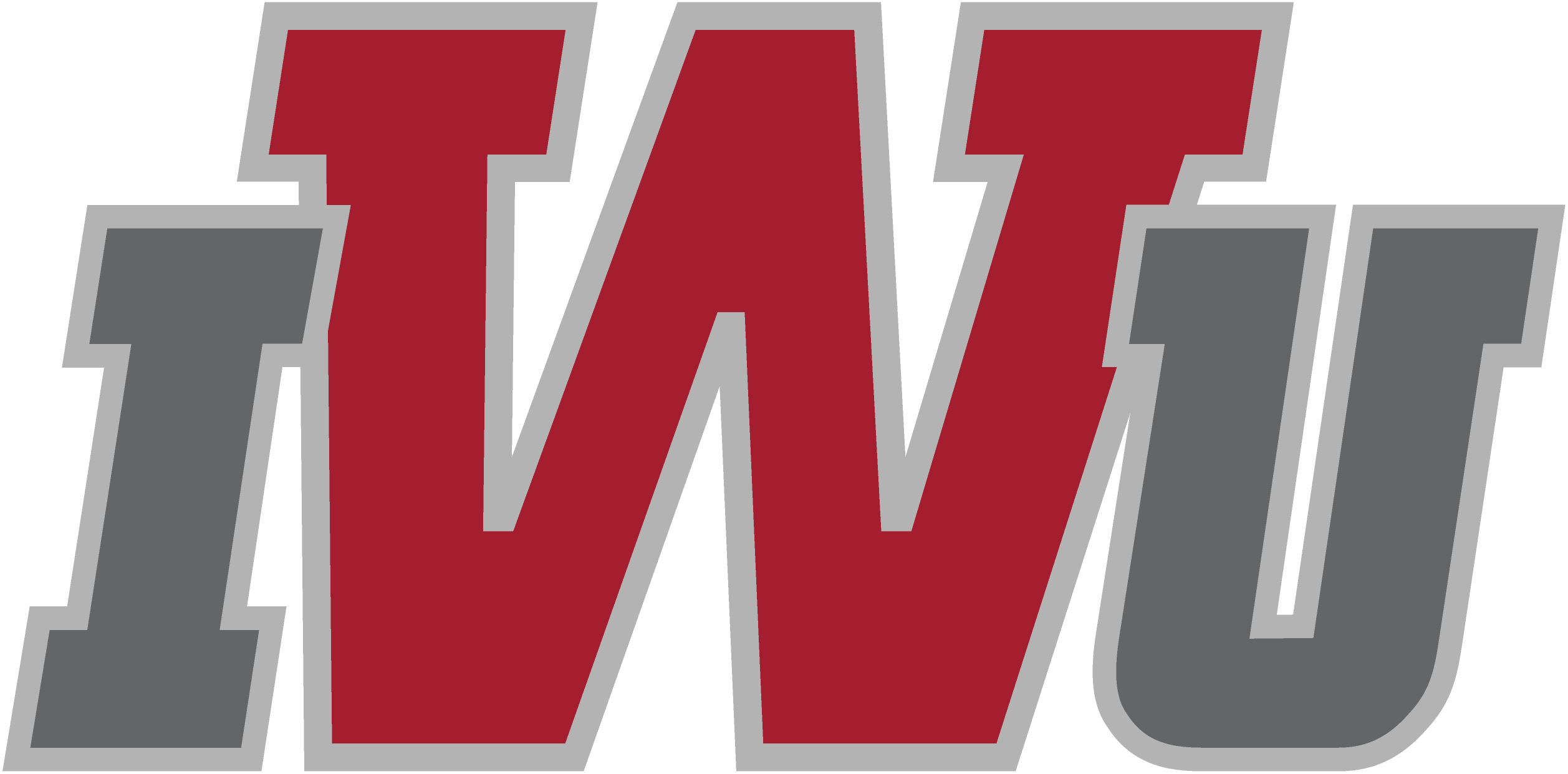

The Indiana Wesleyan Wildcats are the athletic teams that represent Indiana Wesleyan University, located in Marion, Indiana, in intercollegiate sports as a member of the National Association of Intercollegiate Athletics (NAIA), primarily competing in the Crossroads League (formerly known as the Mid-Central College Conference (MCCC) until after the 2011–12 school year) since the 1973–74 academic year; while its football team competes in the Mideast League of the Mid-States Football Association (MSFA) and its men's and women's swimming teams compete in the Mid-South Conference (MSC). They were also a member of the National Christian College Athletic Association (NCCAA), primarily competing as an independent in the Midwest Region of the Division I level.

The university has earned a national reputation for athletic excellence and in recent years, has dominated both the Crossroads League and NCCAA. IWU won the Commissioners Cup a record eight consecutive years, and placed among the Top 20 in the NAIA United States Sports Academy Directors' Cup Standings nine straight years. The university was awarded the 2008 NCCAA President's Cup as the best overall athletic program in the nation, and shared the award with Cedarville University in 2009, the fourth time IWU has won the award.

== Varsity teams ==
IWU competes in 24 intercollegiate varsity sports:

Men's sports	Women's sports
Baseball	Basketball
Basketball	Bowling
Bowling	Cross country
Cross country	Golf
Football	Soccer
Golf	Soccer
Soccer	Softball
Tennis	Swimming
Swimming	Tennis
Track and field^{1}	Track and field^{1}
Volleyball (coming spring 2027)	Volleyball
Co-ed sports
Competitive Cheer, Esports
^{1} – includes both indoor and outdoor

== Club teams ==
IWU has also competitive club teams in running (men's and women's), soccer (m/w), and softball.

== Championships ==
The university has won 31 national championship titles, including 2 NAIA national championships from the record-setting 2006–2007 women's basketball team that went 38–0 and the 2012–2013 women's basketball team. IWU has won an additional 3 NAIA national championships in 2014, 2016 and 2018 in men's basketball. Katie Wilson and Lucia Solis won the ITA NAIA National Tennis Doubles Title in 2015. The other 26 titles are NCCAA national championships. The Women's Tennis Team has won the Crossroads League Conference Championship 31 years in a row. They have won more matches than any other tennis team in any division since 2014. The Men's Tennis Team won a record 41 matches in the 2021–22 season. No other tennis team at any level has won more than 39 matches in a given season. In 2023 they won the NAIA Women's Volleyball national title by going undefeated all season with a 38-0 seasonal score. In 2024, they won the national title again after an epic comeback in the final tie break against Bellevue from 8:14 to 16:14, sealing another triumphant season with a 34-win winning streak and a season score of 37:2.

=== National championships ===
Assoc.	Sport	Titles	Winning years
NAIA	Basketball (men's)	3	2014, 2016, 2018
NAIA	Basketball (women's)	2	2007, 2013
NAIA	Volleyball (women's)	2	2023, 2024, 2025
NAIA	Tennis (women's)	5	2003, 2005, 2007, 2008, 2016
NAIA	Soccer (women's)	4	1997, 1999, 2000, 2007
NAIA	Volleyball	6	1985, 2000, 2010, 2015, 2023, 2024
NAIA	Basketball (men's)	2	1995, 2008
NAIA	Basketball (women's)	2	2000, 2002
NAIA	Cross Country (women's)	1	2003
NAIA	Cross Country (men's)	1	2025
NAIA	Golf	2	2005, 2006
NAIA	Soccer (men's)	1	2008
NAIA	Track and Field (men's)	2	1994, 2008
NAIA	Track and Field (women's)	1	2003
NAIA	Track and field (indoor) (men's)	1	2008
NAIA	Track and Field (indoor) (women's)	2	2003, 2004

Men's sports began Crossroads League play in 1968 and women's sports began league play in 1986. The university holds the record for league championships with 180 titles as of 2021.

=== Crossroads league championships ===
Sport	Titles	Winning years
Tennis (women's)	31	1992–2022
Cross country (men's)	21	1973, 1981, 1982, 1983, 1984, 1985, 1986, 1989, 1990, 1991, 1992, 1993, 2000, 2001, 2005, 2006, 2007, 2013, 2017, 2018, 2019
Tennis (men's)	20	1979, 1980, 1982, 1984, 1985, 1986, 1987, 1989, 1990, 2002, 2003, 2004, 2006, 2008, 2009, 2012, 2013, 2017, 2019, 2020, 2021
Soccer (women's)	14	1996, 1998, 1999, 2000, 2001, 2002, 2003, 2004, 2005, 2006, 2007, 2008, 2009, 2021
Volleyball	15	1999, 2002, 2006, 2007, 2008, 2011, 2012, 2013, 2014, 2016, 2017, 2019, 2020, 2023, 2024
Golf (men's)	12	1977, 1981–1985, 1987, 1994, 1995, 1997, 2007, 2014
Cross country (women's)	12	1998–2005, 2007, 2008, 2010, 2011
Track and field (women's)	11	1999, 2002, 2003, 2004, 2005, 2007, 2012, 2014, 2015, 2016, 2019
Basketball (women's)	10	1994, 2002–2005, 2007, 2011, 2012, 2016, 2021
Soccer (men's)	9	1993, 1994, 1998, 2006, 2007, 2008, 2013, 2014, 2015
Track and field (men's)	9	1982, 1983, 1994, 2007, 2008, 2010, 2011, 2012, 2013
Softball	8	1989, 1992, 2005, 2006, 2012, 2015, 2018, 2021
Baseball	6	1975, 1980, 1983, 1985, 2018, 2021
Basketball (men's)	5	2007, 2010, 2018, 2019, 2020

=== 2006–2007 ===
The 2006–2007 school year was a record year for IWU sports, winning conference championships in 10 of the 16 MCC sports, which is a conference record. Both the men's and women's soccer and basketball teams captured MCC championships, the first school to do so. In addition, the men's golf team captured its second straight NCCAA national championship and the women's tennis team won the NCCAA national championship as well (the program's third overall). The men's basketball team qualified for the NAIA national tournament and advanced to the Elite Eight for the first time in program history. However, the story of the year was the record-breaking women's basketball team, who captured the first NAIA national championship in school history by defeating College of the Ozarks in the final. The Wildcats posted a perfect 38–0 record, becoming the first basketball team in NAIA history to go undefeated.

=== 2007–2008 ===
The Wildcats completed one of its finest athletic seasons to date during the 2007–08 season. The year started well, including MCC championships in men's (2nd in a row) and women's soccer (10th in a row), women's tennis (17th in a row), men's (3rd in a row) and women's cross country, women's volleyball (2nd in a row), and men's golf. Both the men's and women's soccer teams and the women's volleyball team (6th in a row) secured MCC Tournament championships as well. The men's soccer team posted a 14–3–1 regular season record, the best in program history, reached #6 in the NAIA national rankings (also a record mark), and won the NCCAA Midwest Regional Championship, as well as being ranked #1 in the NCCAA national poll for most of the season. The women's soccer team also won the NCCAA national championship (the program's fourth overall) and finished with a season record of 21–2–1, the best in school history. IWU was well on its way to securing its seventh straight MCC Commissioners Cup.

In December, the women's basketball team broke a 24-year-old NAIA record by winning their 48th consecutive game. Despite losing 4 starters from the previous season, they started 2007–2008 18–0, extending their record mark by winning a staggering 56 consecutive games. The historic streak was snapped, however, on January 12, 2008, in a loss to MCC rival Bethel College. Despite being picked to finish fourth in the preseason MCC coaches poll, the Wildcats exceeded expectations and finished the season in second place in the MCC, behind Bethel College. In the MCC Tournament championship, the Wildcats lost again to Bethel for the third time in the season. However, IWU received an at-large bid to the NAIA National Tournament, where, though favored, they lost in the first round against William Jewell College. The women ended their season with a 28–6 overall record, 3 of the losses coming against Bethel.

While the women's season started brightly and faded at the end, the men's was the exact opposite. Following a record season in which they were MCC champions and qualified for the Elite Eight for the first time at the NAIA National Tournament, the men were picked to finish first again in the preseason MCC coaches poll. However, they finished a disappointing fourth with a poor 9–7 conference record. More misery ensued with a shocking loss at home to arch-rival Taylor University in the MCC Tournament first round, which ensured that there would be no return trip to the NAIA's. Despite another bad loss at home to MCC rival Spring Arbor University in the NCCAA Regional Final, the Wildcats still qualified for the NCCAA National Tournament in Oakland City, Indiana, as the #1 seed. On March 20, 2008, IWU avenged their earlier loss to Spring Arbor by defeating them 74–61 in the National Championship. The Wildcats finished the season with an overall record of 23–11. The NCCAA national title was the program's first since IWU won it at home in 1995, and the second in program history.

The men's basketball national championship was IWU's third of a record-setting five NCCAA national titles during the 2007–2008 school year. The women's soccer team won their championship in November, the men's indoor track and field team won in February, the men's outdoor track and field team won in May at IWU, and the women's tennis team also won in May at IWU. In addition, the men's baseball team nearly added a sixth national title, but lost in the NCCAA national championship. In March, IWU clinched their record seventh straight MCC Commissioners Cup, with an 18-point lead over nearest rival, Bethel College. Indiana Wesleyan was also awarded the President's Cup of the NCCAA as the best overall athletic program. IWU cruised to the cup with 119 points with a massive lead over runner-up Cedarville University, which had 77.75 points.

=== 2008–2009 ===
Like the previous two school years, 2008–09 also began well for the Wildcats. The men's and women's soccer teams started the season well, both ranked in the top-20 NAIA national polls. The men made history in September by defeating the #1 ranked team in the NAIA, Auburn Montgomery, 6–2 in Alabama. It was the highest ranked team the Wildcats defeated in program history. In October, the men's soccer team won their third straight MCC regular season championship. However, after winning a record ten-straight MCC championships, the women's soccer team failed to clinch the conference title for the first time since 1997 and finished a disappointing third in the MCC.

In November, the women's cross country team won the MCC championship and the men's cross country team finished second. In the NCCAA national championships, the men finished second and the women finished third. Both teams qualified for the NAIA national championships. Though finishing a disappointing third in the MCC regular season rankings, the volleyball team won its seventh straight MCC tournament title and advanced to the NAIA national tournament for the first time in program history. In similar fashion, the women's soccer team saved their season by winning the MCC tournament championship and advanced to the NAIA national tournament. However, despite winning the MCC regular season title for the third straight year, the men's soccer team lost to Bethel College (who they shared the conference championship with) in the MCC Tournament championship, missing out on the NAIA national tournament for the third straight year. The loss represented a bitter disappointment for the men's program, as qualifying for the NAIA tournament was a major goal for a talent-laden team including senior standouts Joel Trainer, Christian Davis, Mason Bragg and Ben Chleboun.

In the NCCAA Midwest Regional semifinal, the men defeated Grace College 6–1. In a rematch of the 2007 NCCAA Midwest Regional Championship, IWU defeated Spring Arbor University 2–0 to claim the 2008 regional title and advance to the NCCAA national championship tournament in Florida for the second consecutive year. The Wildcats were the top seed in the tournament. In the opening round of the NAIA national championship, the women's soccer team lost 2–0 to defending NAIA national champion Martin Methodist College, after losing top scorer Megan Marshall in a devastating pre-match injury. The volleyball team also lost in the opening round of the NAIA tournament, falling to Dordt College.

In the NCCAA national championship quarterfinals, the top-ranked men's soccer team defeated 8th-seeded Mid-America Christian University 8–1 to advance to the semifinals. In the national semifinals, where the Wildcats lost the previous year, IWU defeated 5th-seeded Mid-Continent University 4–3 in a wild match. After taking a 1–0 lead, disaster struck as freshman Ross Tanzer was ejected in the first half, forcing IWU to play a man down for a staggering 70 minutes. However, trailing 3–2 with 10 minutes left to play, senior Joel Trainer and his sophomore brother David scored in dramatic fashion to win the match, clinching the program's first ever birth in a national championship. The IWU victory over MCU avenged a 2005 loss at the same stage in the NCCAA tournament, which was seniors Joel Trainer, Christian Davis, Mason Bragg, and Ben Chleboun's freshman season. In the national championship match, the Wildcats defeated 3rd-seeded Roberts Wesleyan College 2–0 to clinch the program's first ever national title. After tallying three goals and three assists, Joel Trainer was named NCCAA Tournament Most Valuable Player and Ben Chleboun earned Tournament Most Valuable Defender. Goalkeeper Spencer Lang and sophomore midfielder Mitch Lobdell were also recognized on the All-Tournament Team. The men finished the season with an 18–8 record as MCC regular season champions, NCCAA Midwest Regional Champions, and NCCAA national champions.

Although the women's basketball team finished a disappointing third in the MCC, the men's basketball team won their second MCC regular season championship in three years, sharing it with Bethel College. With a 25–5 regular season record, the Wildcats secured the second-most wins in program history (after the 2007 season). Both the men's and women's basketball teams qualified for their respective NAIA national tournaments. The women advanced to the Sweet Sixteen before being knocked out by College of the Ozarks, who they defeated in the 2007 national championship. The Lady Wildcats ended their season with a 24–10 record and qualified for the NAIA national tournament for an impressive seventh consecutive year. The men advanced to the Elite Eight for the second time in three years before being defeated by tournament host College of the Ozarks, coincidentally the same college that knocked the Lady Wildcats out of the NAIA tournament. Senior standout Antonio Murrell ended his IWU career with a 23-point performance against Ozarks, which made him the fourth-highest scorer in program history. Murrell also holds the IWU record for most career assists. Murrell and junior Zach Coverstone were named NAIA All-Americans after the season. The Wildcats ended their season with a 29–7 record, one win short of the all-time program mark from the 2006–2007 season.

In April, the men's tennis team won their second-straight MCC championship and the women's team clinched their staggering 18th straight conference title, both with undefeated seasons. While the two tennis titles were the only MCC championships IWU would win during the spring season, they proved to be enough to hold off Bethel College in the MCC Commissioners Cup rankings, clinching IWU's eighth consecutive all sport trophy by a slim 4-point margin.

== Football ==
In 2016, IWU announced plans to begin competing in football as a new men's varsity sport. They named Jordan Langs to become the Wildcats' head coach. Langs built the program from the ground up as IWU prepared to begin play in 2018.

In its inaugural season, Indiana Wesleyan played in the Mideast League of the Mid-States Football Association as an associate member whose games did not count in the conference standings. The historic season began on September 1, 2018. IWU hosted a cross-county rival, the Taylor Trojans. Though IWU lead in the first half, the experienced Trojans beat the Wildcats by a score of 43–31.

=== Season-by-season results ===
Year	Team	Overall	Conference	Standing	Bowl/playoffs	NAIA^{#}
Indiana Wesleyan Wildcats (Mid-States Football Association) (2018–present)
2018	Indiana Wesleyan	7–3	0–0			
2019	Indiana Wesleyan	6–4	3–3	T–4th (MEL)		
2020	Indiana Wesleyan	2–3	2–3	4th (MEL)		
2021	Indiana Wesleyan	7–4	4–3	4th (MEL)	forfeit gm to Kansas Wesleyan	5th
2022	Indiana Wesleyan	11–2	7–0	1st (MEL)	L NAIA Semifinals	5th
2023	Indiana Wesleyan	10–2	6–1	T–1st (MEL)	L NAIA Quarterfinals	6th
2024	Indiana Wesleyan	11–2	5–0	1st (MEL)	L NAIA Quarterfinals	3rd
2025	Indiana Wesleyan	9–3	5–0	1st (MEL)	L NAIA Second round	10th
Indiana Wesleyan:		63–23	33–10			
Total:		63–23				
National championship Conference title Conference division title or championship game berth
^{#}Rankings from NAIA Coaches' Poll.

=== Crossroads league championships ===
Statistic	Indiana Wesleyan	Rival(s)
Games played	20	
Wins	13	7
Ties	0	
Home wins	8	5
Road wins	5	2
Home regular season wins	8	5
Road regular season wins	5	2
Most consecutive wins	5 (2018–2018)	2 (2019–present)
Most consecutive regular season wins	5 (2018–2018)	2 (2019–present)
Most consecutive home wins	8 (2018–2019)	2 (2018–2019)
Most consecutive road/neutral wins	2 (2018)	1 (2018, 2019–present)
Most points scored in a game by one team	80 (2018 – IWU 80, Trinity Bible 6)	55 (2018 – Concordia (MI) 55, IWU 7)
Most points scored in a game by one team in a loss	31 (2018 – Taylor 43, IWU 31)	36 (2018 – IWU 40, Olivet Nazarene 36)
Fewest points scored in a game by one team in a win	14 (2019 – IWU 14, Taylor 13	28 (2019 – Concordia 28, IWU 17)
Fewest points scored in a regular season game by one team	7 (2018 – Concordia (MI) 55, IWU 7)	0 (2019 – IWU 66, Trinity Int'l 0)
Most points scored in a game by both teams	86 (2018 – IWU 80, Trinity Bible 6)	
Fewest points scored in a game by both teams	27 (2019 – IWU 14, Taylor 13)	
Largest margin of victory	74 (2018 – IWU 80, Trinity Bible 6)	48 (2018 – Concordia (MI) 55, IWU 7)

== Notable people ==
- Jordan Weidner, former basketball player
- Josh Worrell, the former minor league baseball player, was drafted by the Kansas City Royals in 2009
- Brandon Moore, the former minor league baseball player, raftded by the New York Mets in 2008.
- Brandon Beachy, the former professional baseball player, played for the Atlanta Braves and Los Angeles Dodgers
