= 2017 NCAA Division I men's basketball tournament =

Edition of USA college basketball tournament

- Season: 2016–17
- Teams: 68
- Finals site: University of Phoenix Stadium, Glendale, Arizona
- Champions: North Carolina Tar Heels (6th title, 11th title game, 20th Final Four)
- Runner-up: Gonzaga Bulldogs (1st title game, 1st Final Four)
- Semifinalists: Oregon Ducks (2nd Final Four); South Carolina Gamecocks (1st Final Four)
- Winning coach: Roy Williams (3rd title)
- MOP: Joel Berry II (North Carolina)
- Top scorer: Tyler Dorsey (Oregon) (119 points)

The 2017 NCAA Division I men's basketball tournament involved 68 teams playing in a single-elimination tournament to determine the men's National Collegiate Athletic Association (NCAA) Division I college basketball national champion for the 2016–17 season. The 79th edition of the tournament began on March 14, 2017, and concluded with the championship game on April 3 at University of Phoenix Stadium in Glendale, Arizona. The championship game was the first to be contested in the Western United States since the 1995 tournament when Seattle was the host of the Final Four.

In the Final Four, North Carolina beat Oregon in Oregon's first Final Four appearance since the inaugural tournament in 1939, while Gonzaga defeated South Carolina in both teams' first ever Final Four appearance. This was the first NCAA tournament since 1979 to see two first-time Final Four participants. North Carolina then defeated Gonzaga 71–65 to win their 6th national championship, and 3rd under Roy Williams.

After being the only longstanding Power Five team to never make the tournament, Northwestern from the Big Ten finally made the tournament for the first time in program history. North Dakota (Big Sky), UC Davis (Big West), Northern Kentucky (Horizon League), and Jacksonville State (Ohio Valley) also all made their tournament debuts.

== Tournament procedures ==
A total of 68 teams entered the 2017 tournament, with all 32 conference tournament winners receiving an automatic bid. The Ivy League, which previously granted its automatic tournament bid to its regular season champion, hosted a postseason tournament to determine a conference champion for the first time. In previous years, had the Ivy League had two schools tied for first in the standings, a one-game playoff (or series as was the case in the 2002 season) determined the automatic bid. On March 10, 2016, the Ivy League's council of presidents approved a four-team tournament where the top four teams in the regular season would play on March 11 and 12 at Philadelphia's Palestra.

The remaining 36 teams received "at-large" bids which are extended by the NCAA Selection Committee. On January 24, 2016, the NCAA announced that the Selection Committee would, for the first time, unveil in-season rankings of the top four teams in each division on February 11, 2017.

Eight teams—the four lowest-seeded automatic qualifiers and the four lowest-seeded at-large teams—played in the First Four (the successor to what had been known as "play-in games" through the 2010 tournament). The winners of these games advanced to the main draw of the tournament.

The Selection Committee also seeded the entire field from 1 to 68.

The committee's selections resulted in two historic milestones. The Northwestern Wildcats of the Big Ten Conference made their first-ever NCAA Tournament in school history, officially becoming the last "power conference" school to make the tournament. (This fact is ironic considering that Northwestern hosted the first-ever NCAA Tournament in 1939). The Wildcats' First round opponent, the Vanderbilt Commodores of the Southeastern Conference, also made history: with a record of 19–15, they set the mark for the most ever losses for an at-large team in tournament history.

Four conference champions also made their first NCAA appearances: North Dakota (Big Sky Conference), UC Davis (Big West Conference), Jacksonville State (Ohio Valley Conference), and first-year Division I school Northern Kentucky (Horizon League).

== Schedule and venues ==
2017 First Four (orange) and First and Second rounds (green)
Note: Greensboro, North Carolina was originally awarded First and Second round games, but the games were relocated to Greenville, South Carolina due to NCAA objections over HB2.
2017 Regionals (blue) and Final Four (red)

The following sites were selected to host each round of the 2017 tournament

First Four

- March 14 and 15
  - University of Dayton Arena, Dayton, Ohio (Host: University of Dayton)

First and Second Rounds

- March 16 and 18
  - Amway Center, Orlando, Florida (Hosts: University of Central Florida, Stetson University)
  - Bradley Center, Milwaukee, Wisconsin (Host: Marquette University)
  - KeyBank Center, Buffalo, New York (Hosts: Canisius College, Niagara University, Metro Atlantic Athletic Conference)
  - Vivint Arena, Salt Lake City (Host: University of Utah)
- March 17 and 19
  - Bankers Life Fieldhouse, Indianapolis, Indiana (Hosts: IUPUI, Horizon League)
  - BOK Center, Tulsa, Oklahoma (Host: University of Tulsa)
  - Bon Secours Wellness Arena, Greenville, South Carolina, (Hosts: Furman University, Southern Conference)
  - Golden 1 Center, Sacramento, California (Host: California State University, Sacramento)

Regional semifinals and Finals (Sweet Sixteen and Elite Eight)

- March 23 and 25
  - Midwest Regional, Sprint Center, Kansas City, Missouri (Host: Big 12 Conference)
  - West Regional, SAP Center, San Jose, California (Host: Pac-12 Conference)
- March 24 and 26
  - East Regional, Madison Square Garden, New York, New York (Hosts: St. John's University, Big East Conference)
  - South Regional, FedExForum, Memphis, Tennessee (Host: University of Memphis)

National semifinals and championship (Final Four and championship)

- April 1 and 3
  - University of Phoenix Stadium, Glendale, Arizona (Host: Arizona State University)

== Qualification and selection ==
2017 Participants: East Region (blue), South Region (red), Midwest Region (green), and West Region (purple)

Eight teams, out of 351 in Division I, were ineligible to participate in the 2017 tournament due to failing to meet APR requirements, self-imposed postseason bans, or reclassification from a lower division. (Note: These 8 teams are ineligible for the following reasons: Academic Progress Rate Alcorn State Savannah State Self-imposed bans Northern Colorado Cal State Northridge Reclassification Abilene Christian Grand Canyon Incarnate Word UMass Lowell) Hawaii had previously been banned from entering the tournament as a penalty for infractions, but the NCAA later reversed its ban.

=== Automatic qualifiers ===
The following 32 teams were automatic qualifiers for the 2017 NCAA field by virtue of winning their conference's automatic bid.

Conference	Team	Appearance	Last bid
America East	Vermont	6th	2012
American	SMU	12th	2015
Atlantic 10	Rhode Island	9th	1999
ACC	Duke	41st	2016
ASUN	Florida Gulf Coast	3rd	2016
Big 12	Iowa State	19th	2016
Big East	Villanova	37th	2016
Big Sky	North Dakota	1st	Never
Big South	Winthrop	10th	2010
Big Ten	Michigan	27th	2016
Big West	UC Davis	1st	Never
CAA	UNC Wilmington	6th	2016
C-USA	Middle Tennessee	9th	2016
Horizon	Northern Kentucky	1st	Never (Note: First year of eligibility for NCAA-sponsored Division I postseason play)
Ivy League (Note: Inaugural conference tournament)	Princeton	25th	2011
MAAC	Iona	12th	2016
MAC	Kent State	6th	2008
MEAC	North Carolina Central	2nd	2014
Missouri Valley	Wichita State	14th	2016
Mountain West	Nevada	7th	2007
NEC	Mount St. Mary's	5th	2014
Ohio Valley	Jacksonville State	1st	Never
Pac-12	Arizona	34th	2016
Patriot	Bucknell	7th	2013
SEC	Kentucky	57th	2016
Southern	East Tennessee State	10th	2010
Southland	New Orleans	5th	1996
SWAC	Texas Southern	7th	2015
Summit League	South Dakota State	4th	2016
Sun Belt	Troy	2nd	2003
WCC	Gonzaga	20th	2016
WAC	New Mexico State	23rd	2015

=== Tournament seeds ===
East Regional – Madison Square Garden, New York City, New York
Seed	School	Conference	Record	Overall Seed	Berth type	Last bid
1	Villanova	Big East	31–3	1	Auto	2016
2	Duke	ACC	27–8	7	Auto	2016
3	Baylor	Big 12	25–7	12	At-Large	2016
4	Florida	SEC	24–8	14	At-Large	2014
5	Virginia	ACC	22–10	17	At-Large	2016
6	SMU	American	30–4	21	Auto	2015
7	South Carolina	SEC	22–10	26	At-Large	2004
8	Wisconsin	Big Ten	25–9	29	At-Large	2016
9	Virginia Tech	ACC	22–10	36	At-Large	2007
10	Marquette	Big East	19–12	39	At-Large	2013
11*	Providence	Big East	20–12	42	At-Large	2016
11*	USC	Pac-12	24–9	45	At-Large	2016
12	UNC Wilmington	CAA	29–5	49	Auto	2016
13	East Tennessee State	Southern	27–7	52	Auto	2010
14	New Mexico State	WAC	28–5	55	Auto	2015
15	Troy	Sun Belt	22–14	60	Auto	2003
16*	Mount St. Mary's	NEC	19–15	68	Auto	2014
16*	New Orleans	Southland	20–11	67	Auto	1996

Midwest Regional – Sprint Center, Kansas City, Missouri
Seed	School	Conference	Record	Overall Seed	Berth type	Last bid
1	Kansas	Big 12	28–4	2	At-Large	2016
2	Louisville	ACC	24–8	8	At-Large	2015
3	Oregon	Pac-12	29–5	9	At-Large	2016
4	Purdue	Big Ten	25–7	16	At-Large	2016
5	Iowa State	Big 12	23–10	20	Auto	2016
6	Creighton	Big East	25–9	24	At-Large	2014
7	Michigan	Big Ten	24–11	27	Auto	2016
8	Miami (FL)	ACC	21–11	30	At-Large	2016
9	Michigan State	Big Ten	19–14	35	At-Large	2016
10	Oklahoma State	Big 12	20–12	37	At-Large	2015
11	Rhode Island	Atlantic 10	24–9	44	Auto	1999
12	Nevada	Mountain West	28–6	47	Auto	2007
13	Vermont	America East	29–5	53	Auto	2012
14	Iona	MAAC	22–12	58	Auto	2016
15	Jacksonville State	Ohio Valley	20–14	61	Auto	Never
16*	North Carolina Central	MEAC	25–8	66	Auto	2014
16*	UC Davis	Big West	22–12	65	Auto	Never

West Regional – SAP Center, San Jose, California
Seed	School	Conference	Record	Overall Seed	Berth type	Last bid
1	Gonzaga	WCC	32–1	4	Auto	2016
2	Arizona	Pac-12	30–4	6	Auto	2016
3	Florida State	ACC	25–8	10	At-Large	2012
4	West Virginia	Big 12	26–8	15	At-Large	2016
5	Notre Dame	ACC	25–9	19	At-Large	2016
6	Maryland	Big Ten	24–8	23	At-Large	2016
7	Saint Mary's	WCC	28–4	25	At-Large	2013
8	Northwestern	Big Ten	23–11	32	At-Large	Never
9	Vanderbilt	SEC	19–15	33	At-Large	2016
10	VCU	Atlantic 10	26–8	40	At-Large	2016
11	Xavier	Big East	21–13	41	At-Large	2016
12	Princeton	Ivy League	23–6	50	Auto	2011
13	Bucknell	Patriot	26–8	51	Auto	2013
14	Florida Gulf Coast	Atlantic Sun	26–7	56	Auto	2016
15	North Dakota	Big Sky	22–9	62	Auto	Never
16	South Dakota State	Summit League	18–16	64	Auto	2016

South Regional – FedExForum, Memphis, Tennessee
Seed	School	Conference	Record	Overall Seed	Berth type	Last bid
1	North Carolina	ACC	27–7	3	At-Large	2016
2	Kentucky	SEC	29–5	5	Auto	2016
3	UCLA	Pac-12	29–4	11	At-Large	2015
4	Butler	Big East	23–8	13	At-Large	2016
5	Minnesota	Big Ten	24–9	18	At-Large	2013
6	Cincinnati	American	29–5	22	At-Large	2016
7	Dayton	Atlantic 10	24–7	28	At-Large	2016
8	Arkansas	SEC	25–9	31	At-Large	2015
9	Seton Hall	Big East	21–11	34	At-Large	2016
10	Wichita State	Missouri Valley	30–4	38	Auto	2016
11*	Kansas State	Big 12	20–13	46	At-Large	2014
11*	Wake Forest	ACC	19–13	43	At-Large	2010
12	Middle Tennessee	Conference USA	30–4	48	Auto	2016
13	Winthrop	Big South	26–6	54	Auto	2010
14	Kent State	MAC	22–13	57	Auto	2008
15	Northern Kentucky	Horizon	24–10	59	Auto	Never
16	Texas Southern	SWAC	23–11	63	Auto	2015

*See First Four

== Bracket ==
All times are listed as Eastern Daylight Time (UTC−4)

=== First Four – Dayton, Ohio ===
The First Four games involved eight teams: the four overall lowest-ranked teams, and the four lowest-ranked at-large teams.

March 14 – East Region
16	Mount St. Mary's	67
16	New Orleans	66

March 14 – South Region
11	Kansas State	95
11	Wake Forest	88

March 15 – Midwest Region
16	North Carolina Central	63
16	UC Davis	67

March 15 – East Region
11	Providence	71
11	USC	75

==== Game summaries ====
truTV

March 14
6:40 PM

Report

#16 Mount Saint Mary's 67, #16 New Orleans 66
Scoring by half: 32–29, 35–37
Pts: J. Robinson (23); Rebs: M. Wilson (11); Asts: M. Wilson, E. Mitrou-Long (4)	Pts: N. Frye (18); Rebs: T. Broyles, E. Thomas (8); Asts: T. Broyles (3)

University of Dayton Arena
Dayton, OH
Attendance: N/A
Referees: Jeb Hartness, Brent Hampton, Steve McJunkins

truTV

March 14
9:10 PM

Report

#11 Kansas State 95, #11 Wake Forest 88
Scoring by half: 40–36, 55–52
Pts: W. Iwundu (24); Rebs: W. Iwundu, D. Johnson (6); Asts: W. Iwundu (7)	Pts: J. Collins (26); Rebs: J. Collins (9); Asts: B. Crawford (10)

University of Dayton Arena
Dayton, OH
Attendance: N/A
Referees: Nathan Ferrell, Jeff Anderson, Bill McCarthy

truTV

March 15
6:40 PM

Report

#16 North Carolina Central 63, #16 UC Davis 67
Scoring by half: 34–31, 29–36
Pts: D. Graf (15); Rebs: K. Benton (12); Asts: D. Graf (5)	Pts: C. Moneke (18); Rebs: C. Moneke (12); Asts: L. White (4)

University of Dayton Arena
Dayton, OH
Attendance: N/A
Referees: Lamar Simpson, Tony Chiazza, Todd Austin

truTV

March 15
9:10 PM

Report

#11 Providence 71, #11 USC 75
Scoring by half: 44–29, 27–46
Pts: E. Holt (18); Rebs: E. Holt (11); Asts: K. Cartwright (7)	Pts: B. Boatwright (24); Rebs: J. McLaughlin (10); Asts: J. McLaughlin, D. Melton (4)

University of Dayton Arena
Dayton, OH
Attendance: N/A
Referees: Bo Boroski, Bill Covington, Nate Harris

=== East Regional – New York City, New York ===
First round Round of 64; March 16–17
1	Villanova	76
16	Mount St. Mary's	56
Buffalo – Thu/Sat
8	Wisconsin	84
9	Virginia Tech	74
5	Virginia	76
12	UNC Wilmington	71
Orlando – Thu/Sat
4	Florida	80
13	East Tennessee State	65
6	SMU	65
11	USC	66
Tulsa – Fri/Sun
3	Baylor	91
14	New Mexico State	73
7	South Carolina	93
10	Marquette	73
Greenville – Fri/Sun
2	Duke	87
15	Troy	65

Second Round; Round of 32; March 18–19
1	Villanova	62
8	Wisconsin	65
5	Virginia	39
4	Florida	65
11	USC	78
3	Baylor	82
7	South Carolina	88
2	Duke	81

Regional semifinals Sweet 16; March 24
8	Wisconsin	83
4	Florida	84^{OT}
3	Baylor	50
7	South Carolina	70

Regional Final; Elite 8 March 26
4	Florida	70
7	South Carolina	77

==== East Regional First round ====
CBS

March 16
7:10 PM

Report

#1 Villanova Wildcats 76, #16 Mount Saint Mary's 56
Scoring by half: 30–29, 46–27
Pts: D. DiVincenzo (21); Rebs: D. DiVincenzo (13); Asts: K. Jenkins, M. Bridges, J. Brunson (3)	Pts: M. Wilson (22); Rebs: M. Wilson (7); Asts: E. Mitrou-Long (4)

KeyBank Center
Buffalo, NY
Attendance: N/A
Referees: Dwayne Gladden, Mike Scyphers, Tony Padilla

CBS

March 16
9:43 PM

Report

#8 Wisconsin 84, #9 Virginia Tech 74
Scoring by half: 34–30, 50–44
Pts: B. Koenig (28); Rebs: N. Hayes (10); Asts: Z. Showalter (4)	Pts: Z. LeDay (23); Rebs: T. Outlaw (7); Asts: J. Robinson, S. Allen (6)

KeyBank Center
Buffalo, NY
Attendance: N/A
Referees: Gregory Nixon, Gary Prager, Jeff Anderson

truTV

March 16
12:40 PM

Report

#5 Virginia 76, #12 UNC Wilmington 71
Scoring by half: 30–29, 46–42
Pts: L. Perrantes (24); Rebs: D. Hall (7); Asts: L. Perrantes, D. Hall (3)	Pts: C. Flemmings (18); Rebs: D. Cacok (15); Asts: J. Talley (5)

Amway Center
Orlando, FL
Attendance: N/A
Referees: Bill Ek, Pat Adams, Karl Hess

truTV

March 16
3:26 PM

Report

#4 Florida 80, #13 East Tennessee State 65
Scoring by half: 33–32, 47–33
Pts: D. Robinson (24); Rebs: D. Robinson, K. Hayes (7); Asts: K. Hill (6)	Pts: T. Cromer (19); Rebs: T. Glass (9); Asts: J. Long (6)

Amway Center
Orlando, FL
Attendance: N/A
Referees: Larry Scirotto, Rodrick Dixon, Mike Eades

==== East Regional Final ====
CBS

Sunday, March 26
2:20 pm EDT

Box score

#7 South Carolina Gamecocks 77, #4 Florida Gators 70
Scoring by half: 33–40, 44–30
Pts: S. Thornwell – 26; Rebs: C. Silva – 9 Asts: D. Notice – 3	Pts: J. Leon – 18; Rebs: K. Hayes – 8 Asts: K. Hill – 5

Madison Square Garden – New York City
Attendance: 20,047
Referees: Ron Groover, Jeffrey Anderson, Mike Eades

==== East Regional all tournament team ====
- Sindarius Thornwell (Sr, South Carolina) – East Regional most outstanding player
- PJ Dozier (So, South Carolina)
- KeVaughn Allen (So, Florida)
- Chris Chiozza (Jr, Florida)
- Nigel Hayes (Sr, Wisconsin)

=== West Regional – San Jose, California ===
First round Round of 64; March 16
1	Gonzaga	66
16	South Dakota State	46
Salt Lake City – Thu/Sat
8	Northwestern	68
9	Vanderbilt	66
5	Notre Dame	60
12	Princeton	58
Buffalo – Thu/Sat
4	West Virginia	86
13	Bucknell	80
6	Maryland	65
11	Xavier	76
Orlando – Thu/Sat
3	Florida State	86
14	Florida Gulf Coast	80
7	Saint Mary's	85
10	VCU	77
Salt Lake City – Thu/Sat
2	Arizona	100
15	North Dakota	82

Second Round; Round of 32; March 18
1	Gonzaga	79
8	Northwestern	73
5	Notre Dame	71
4	West Virginia	83
11	Xavier	91
3	Florida State	66
7	Saint Mary's	60
2	Arizona	69

Regional semifinals Sweet 16; March 23
1	Gonzaga	61
4	West Virginia	58
11	Xavier	73
2	Arizona	71

Regional Final; Elite 8 March 25
1	Gonzaga	83
11	Xavier	59

==== West Regional First round ====
TBS

March 16
2:00 PM

Report

#1 Gonzaga 66, #16 South Dakota State 46
Scoring by half: 26–22, 40–24
Pts: J. Mathews (16); Rebs: J. Williams (14); Asts: N. Williams-Goss (4)	Pts: M. Daum (17); Rebs: T. King (9); Asts: M. Orris, C. Howell (3)

Vivint Smart Home Arena
Salt Lake City, UT
Attendance: N/A
Referees: Jeff Clark, Larry Spaulding, Eric Curry

==== West Regional Final ====
TBS

Saturday, March 25
3:09 pm PDT

Box score

#11 Xavier Musketeers 59, #1 Gonzaga Bulldogs 83
Scoring by half: 39–49, 20–34
Pts: J. Macura – 18; Rebs: K. Gates, T. Bluiett – 7 Asts: J. Macura, Q. Goodin – 2	Pts: N. Williams-Goss – 23; Rebs: N. Williams-Goss – 8 Asts: N. Williams-Goss – 4

SAP Center – San Jose, California
Attendance: 17,011
Referees: James Breeding, Kipp Kissinger, Michael Stephens

==== West Regional all tournament team ====
- Johnathan Williams (Jr, Gonzaga) – West Regional most outstanding player
- Trevon Bluiett (Jr, Xavier)
- J. P. Macura (Jr, Xavier)
- Jordan Mathews (Sr, Gonzaga)
- Nigel Williams-Goss (Jr, Gonzaga)

=== Midwest Regional – Kansas City, Missouri ===
First round Round of 64; March 16–17
1	Kansas	100
16	UC Davis	62
Tulsa – Fri/Sun
8	Miami (FL)	58
9	Michigan State	78
5	Iowa State	84
12	Nevada	73
Milwaukee – Thu/Sat
4	Purdue	80
13	Vermont	70
6	Creighton	72
11	Rhode Island	84
Sacramento – Fri/Sun
3	Oregon	93
14	Iona	77
7	Michigan	92
10	Oklahoma State	91
Indianapolis – Fri/Sun
2	Louisville	78
15	Jacksonville State	63

Second Round; Round of 32; March 18–19
1	Kansas	90
9	Michigan State	70
5	Iowa State	76
4	Purdue	80
11	Rhode Island	72
3	Oregon	75
7	Michigan	73
2	Louisville	69

Regional semifinals Sweet 16; March 23
1	Kansas	98
4	Purdue	66
3	Oregon	69
7	Michigan	68

Regional Final; Elite 8 March 25
1	Kansas	60
3	Oregon	74

==== Midwest Regional First round ====
TNT

March 17
6:50 PM

Report

#1 Kansas 100, #16 UC Davis 62
Scoring by half: 50–28, 50–34
Pts: F. Mason III (22); Rebs: L. Lucas (11); Asts: F. Mason III (8)	Pts: C. Moneke (20); Rebs: C. Moneke (9); Asts: D. Graham, B. Lemar, A. Hennings (2)

Bank of Oklahoma Center
Tulsa, OK
Attendance: N/A
Referees: DJ Carstensen, Deldre Carr, Ray Acosta

==== Midwest Regional Final ====
TBS

Saturday, March 25
7:49 pm CDT

Box score

#3 Oregon Ducks 74, #1 Kansas Jayhawks 60
Scoring by half: 44–33, 30–27
Pts: T. Dorsey – 27; Rebs: J. Bell – 13; Asts: J. Bell, D. Brooks – 4	Pts: F. Mason III – 21; Rebs: J. Jackson – 12; Asts: J. Jackson – 5

Sprint Center – Kansas City, Missouri
Attendance: 18,643
Referees: Randy McCall, Terry Oglesby, Ted Valentine

==== Midwest Regional all tournament team ====
- Jordan Bell (Jr., Oregon) – Midwest Regional most outstanding player
- Frank Mason III (Sr, Kansas)
- Dillon Brooks (Jr, Oregon)
- Tyler Dorsey (So., Oregon)
- Josh Jackson (Fr, Kansas)

=== South Regional – Memphis, Tennessee ===
First round Round of 64; March 16–17
1	North Carolina	103
16	Texas Southern	64
Greenville – Fri/Sun
8	Arkansas	77
9	Seton Hall	71
5	Minnesota	72
12	Middle Tennessee	81
Milwaukee – Thu/Sat
4	Butler	76
13	Winthrop	64
6	Cincinnati	75
11	Kansas State	61
Sacramento – Fri/Sun
3	UCLA	97
14	Kent State	80
7	Dayton	58
10	Wichita State	64
Indianapolis – Fri/Sun
2	Kentucky	79
15	Northern Kentucky	70

Second Round; Round of 32; March 18–19
1	North Carolina	72
8	Arkansas	65
12	Middle Tennessee	65
4	Butler	74
6	Cincinnati	67
3	UCLA	79
10	Wichita State	62
2	Kentucky	65

Regional semifinals Sweet 16; March 24
1	North Carolina	92
4	Butler	80
3	UCLA	75
2	Kentucky	86

Regional Final; Elite 8 March 26
1	North Carolina	75
2	Kentucky	73

==== South Regional Final ====
CBS

Sunday, March 26
4:05 pm CDT

Box score

#2 Kentucky Wildcats 73, #1 North Carolina Tar Heels 75
Scoring by half: 33–38, 40–37
Pts: E. Adebayo, D. Fox – 13; Rebs: E. Adebayo – 7 Asts: I. Briscoe – 8	Pts: J. Jackson – 19; Rebs: K. Meeks – 17; Asts: J. Jackson – 4

FedExForum – Memphis, Tennessee
Attendance: 16,412
Referees: John Higgins, Keith Kimble, Mike Reed

==== South Regional all tournament team ====
- Luke Maye (So., North Carolina) – South Regional most outstanding player
- De'Aaron Fox (Fr, Kentucky)
- Isaac Humphries (So., Kentucky)
- Joel Berry II (Jr, North Carolina)
- Justin Jackson (Jr, North Carolina)

== Final Four ==
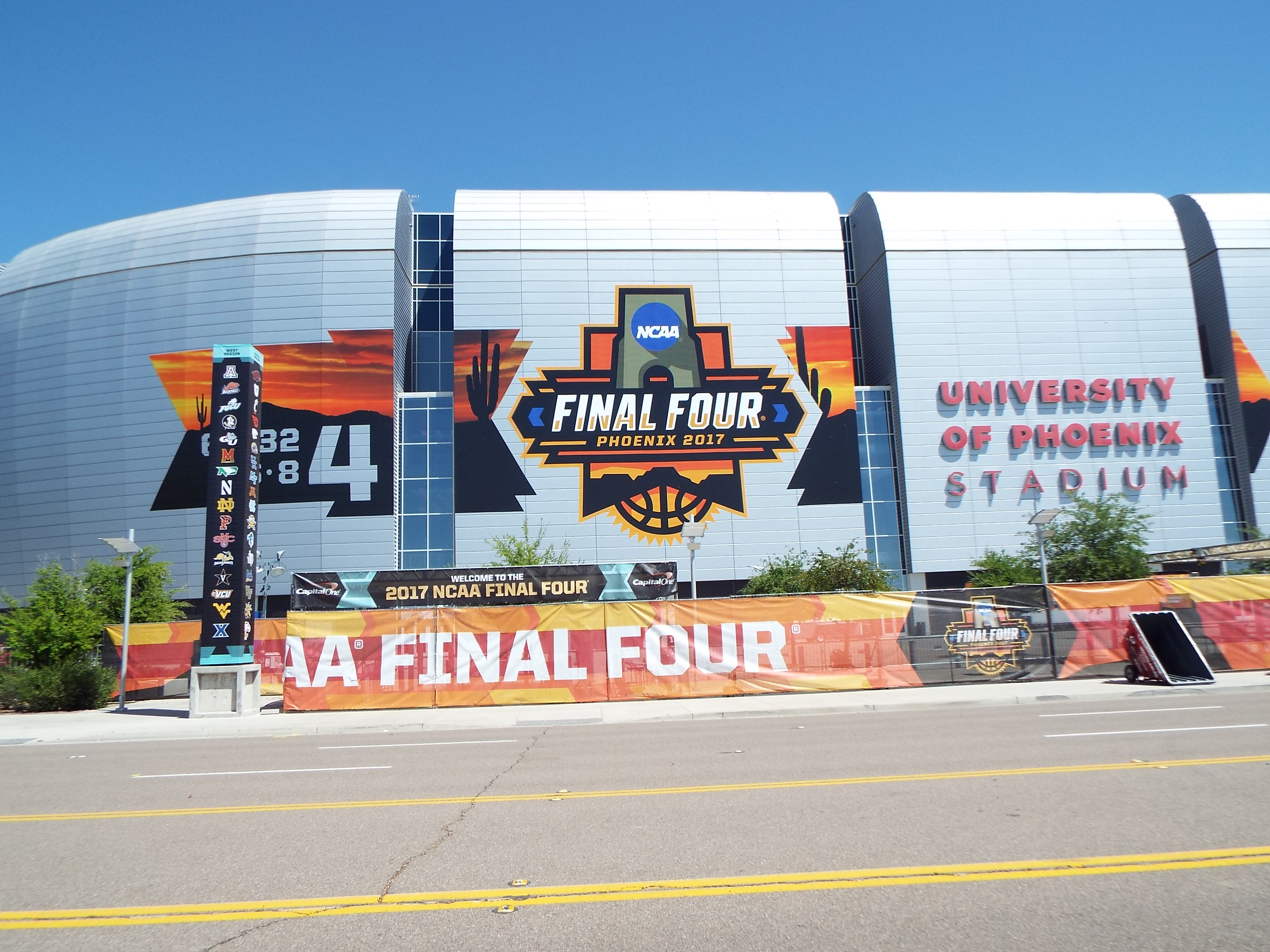
University of Phoenix Stadium, the site of the 2017 Final Four

During the Final Four round, regardless of the seeds of the participating teams, the champion of the top overall top seed's region (Villanova's East Region) plays against the champion of the fourth-ranked top seed's region (Gonzaga's West Region), and the champion of the second overall top seed's region (Kansas's Midwest Region) plays against the champion of the third-ranked top seed's region (North Carolina's South Region).

=== University of Phoenix Stadium – Glendale, Arizona ===
National semifinals April 1
E7	South Carolina	73
W1	Gonzaga	77
MW3	Oregon	76
S1	North Carolina	77

National championship game April 3
W1	Gonzaga	65
S1	North Carolina	71

==== Final Four ====
CBS

Saturday, April 1
3:09 pm MST

Box score

#7 South Carolina Gamecocks 73, #1 Gonzaga Bulldogs 77
Scoring by half: 36–45, 37–32
Pts: P. Dozier – 17; Rebs: C. Silva – 13; Asts: D. Notice – 3	Pts: N. Williams-Goss – 23; Rebs: Z. Collins – 13; Asts: N. Williams-Goss – 6

University of Phoenix Stadium – Glendale, Arizona
Attendance: 77,612
Referees: John Higgins, Doug Sirmons, Jeffrey Anderson

CBS

Saturday, April 1
5:49 pm MST

Box score

#3 Oregon Ducks 76, #1 North Carolina Tar Heels 77
Scoring by half: 36–39, 40–38
Pts: T. Dorsey – 21; Rebs: J. Bell – 16; Asts: D. Ennis – 3	Pts: K. Meeks – 25; Rebs: K. Meeks – 14; Asts: T. Pinson – 5

University of Phoenix Stadium – Glendale, Arizona
Attendance: 77,612
Referees: Ron Groover, Tony Padilla, Ted Valentine

==== National Championship ====
CBS

Monday, April 3
6:20 pm MST

Box score

#1 Gonzaga Bulldogs 65, #1 North Carolina Tar Heels 71
Scoring by half: 35–32, 30–39
Pts: N. Williams-Goss – 15; Rebs: N. Williams-Goss – 9 Asts: N. Williams-Goss – 6	Pts: J. Berry II – 22; Rebs: K. Meeks – 10; Asts: J. Berry II – 6

University of Phoenix Stadium – Glendale, Arizona
Attendance: 76,168
Referees: Verne Harris, Michael Stephens, Mike Eades

==== Final Four all-tournament team ====
- Joel Berry II (Jr, North Carolina) – Final Four Most Outstanding Player
- Nigel Williams-Goss (Jr, Gonzaga)
- Justin Jackson (Jr, North Carolina)
- Kennedy Meeks (Sr, North Carolina)
- Zach Collins (Fr, Gonzaga)

== Game summaries and tournament notes ==
=== Upsets ===
Per the NCAA, "Upsets are defined as when the winner of the game was seeded five or more places lower than the team it defeated."

The 2017 tournament saw a total of 9 upsets, with four in the first round, four in the second round, and one in the Sweet Sixteen.

Upsets in the 2017 NCAA Division I men's basketball tournament
Round	East	West	Midwest	South
Round of 64	No. 11 USC defeated No. 6 SMU, 66–65	No. 11 Xavier defeated No. 6 Maryland, 76–65	No. 11 Rhode Island defeated No. 6 Creighton, 84–72	No. 12 Middle Tennessee defeated No. 5 Minnesota, 81–72
Round of 32	No. 8 Wisconsin defeated No. 1 Villanova, 65–62; No. 7 South Carolina defeated No. 2 Duke, 88–81	No. 11 Xavier defeated No. 3 Florida State, 91–66	No. 7 Michigan defeated No. 2 Louisville, 73–69	None
Sweet 16	None	No. 11 Xavier defeated No. 2 Arizona, 73–71	None	
Elite 8	None			
Final 4	None			
National Championship	None			

== Record by conference ==
Conference	Bids	Record	Win %	R64	R32	S16	E8	F4	CG	NC
ACC	9	11–8	.579	8	6	1	1	1	1	1
WCC	2	6–2	.750	2	2	1	1	1	1	–
Pac-12	4	10–4	.714	4	4	3	1	1	–	–
SEC	5	11–5	.688	5	4	3	3	1	–	–
Big 12	6	9–6	.600	6	4	3	1	–	–	–
Big East	7	6–7	.462	6	3	2	1	–	–	–
Big Ten	7	8–7	.533	7	5	3	–	–	–	–
Atlantic 10	3	1–3	.250	3	1	–	–	–	–	–
American	2	1–2	.333	2	1	–	–	–	–	–
C-USA	1	1–1	.500	1	1	–	–	–	–	–
Missouri Valley	1	1–1	.500	1	1	–	–	–	–	–
Big West	1	1–1	.500	1	–	–	–	–	–	–
NEC	1	1–1	.500	1	–	–	–	–	–	–

- The R64, R32, S16, E8, F4, CG, and NC columns indicate how many teams from each conference were in the round of 64 (first round), round of 32 (second round), Sweet 16, Elite Eight, Final Four, championship game, and national champion, respectively.
- The "Record" column includes wins in the First Four for the Big 12, Big West, NEC, and Pac-12 conferences and losses in the First Four for the ACC and Big East conferences.
- The MEAC and Southland each had one representative, both eliminated in the First Four with a record of 0–1.
- The America East, Atlantic Sun, Big Sky, Big South, CAA, Horizon, Ivy League, MAAC, MAC, Mountain West, Ohio Valley, Patriot, Southern, Summit, Sun Belt, SWAC, and WAC conferences each had one representative, eliminated in the first round with a record of 0–1.

== Media coverage ==
=== Television ===
CBS Sports and Turner Sports held joint U.S. television broadcast rights to the Tournament under the NCAA March Madness brand. As part of a cycle beginning in 2016, CBS held rights to the Final Four and championship game. As CBS did not want its audience to be diffused across multiple outlets, there were no localized "Team Stream" telecasts of the Final Four or championship games on Turner channels as in previous years.

Following criticism of the two-hour format of the 2016 edition, the Selection Sunday broadcast was shortened to 90 minutes. CBS Sports executive Harold Bryant promised that the unveiling of the bracket would be conducted in an "efficient" manner, and leave more time to discuss and preview the tournament.

- First Four – TruTV
- First and Second rounds – CBS, TBS, TNT, and TruTV
- Regional semifinals and Finals (Sweet Sixteen and Elite Eight) – CBS and TBS
- National semifinals (Final Four) and championship – CBS

==== Studio hosts ====
- Greg Gumbel (New York City and Glendale) – first round, second round, regionals, Final Four and national championship game
- Ernie Johnson Jr. (New York City, Atlanta, and Glendale) – first round, second round, regional semi-finals, Final Four and national championship game
- Casey Stern (Atlanta) – First Four, first round and Second Round
- Adam Zucker (New York and Glendale) – First round and second round (in-game updates) and Final Four

==== Studio analysts ====
- Charles Barkley (New York City and Glendale) – first round, second round, regionals, Final Four and national championship game
- Seth Davis (Atlanta and Glendale) – First Four, first round, second round, regional semi-finals, Final Four and national championship game
- Brendan Haywood (Atlanta and Glendale) – First Four, first round, second round, regional semi-finals, and Final Four
- Clark Kellogg (New York City and Glendale) – first round, second round, regionals, Final Four and national championship game
- Jimmy Patsos (Atlanta) – second round
- Bruce Pearl (Atlanta) – first round
- Jon Rothstein (Glendale) - Final Four
- Kenny Smith (New York City and Glendale) – first round, second round, regionals, Final Four and national championship game
- Steve Smith (Glendale) – Final Four
- Wally Szczerbiak (New York City, Atlanta, and Glendale) – First Four, second round, and Final Four
- Buzz Williams (Atlanta) – regional semi-finals
- Jay Wright (Glendale) – Final Four

==== Commentary teams ====
- Jim Nantz/Bill Raftery/Grant Hill/Tracy Wolfson – First and Second Rounds at Indianapolis, Indiana; South Regional at Memphis, Tennessee; Final Four and National Championship at Glendale, Arizona
- Brian Anderson/Chris Webber or Clark Kellogg/Lewis Johnson – First Four at Dayton, Ohio (Tuesday); First and Second Rounds at Greenville, South Carolina; West Regional at San Jose, California
  - Kellogg called the First Four (Tuesday) with Webber doing the First, Second and regionals.
- Verne Lundquist/Jim Spanarkel/Allie LaForce – First and Second Rounds at Buffalo, New York; East Regional at New York City, New York
- Kevin Harlan/Reggie Miller/Dan Bonner/Dana Jacobson – First and Second Rounds at Tulsa, Oklahoma; Midwest Regional at Kansas City, Missouri
- Ian Eagle/Steve Lavin/Evan Washburn – First and Second Rounds at Orlando, Florida
- Spero Dedes/Steve Smith/Len Elmore/Rosalyn Gold-Onwude – First Four at Dayton, Ohio (Wednesday); First and Second Rounds at Sacramento, California
- Andrew Catalon/Steve Lappas/Jamie Erdahl – First and Second Rounds at Salt Lake City, Utah
- Carter Blackburn/Mike Gminski/Debbie Antonelli/Lisa Byington – First and Second Rounds at Milwaukee, Wisconsin

=== Radio ===
Westwood One had exclusive radio rights to the entire tournament. For the first time in the history of the tournament, broadcasts of the Final Four and championship game were available in Spanish.

==== First Four ====
- Ted Emrich and Austin Croshere – at Dayton, Ohio

==== First and Second rounds ====
- Scott Graham and Donny Marshall – Buffalo, New York
- Brandon Gaudin and Kelly Tripucka – Milwaukee, Wisconsin
- Tom McCarthy and Will Perdue – Orlando, Florida
- Kevin Kugler and Dan Dickau – Salt Lake City, Utah
- John Sadak and Eric Montross/John Thompson – Greenville, South Carolina (Montross – Friday night; Thompson – Friday Afternoon & Sunday)
- Chris Carrino and Jim Jackson – Indianapolis, Indiana
- Craig Way and P. J. Carlesimo – Tulsa, Oklahoma
- Jason Benetti and Mike Montgomery – Sacramento, California

==== Regionals ====
- Ian Eagle and Donny Marshall – East Regional at New York City, New York
- Tom McCarthy and Will Purdue – Midwest Regional at Kansas City, Missouri
- Gary Cohen and P. J. Carlesimo – South Regional at Memphis, Tennessee
- Kevin Kugler and Jim Jackson – West Regional at San Jose, California

==== Final Four ====
- Kevin Kugler, Clark Kellogg, and Jim Gray – Glendale, Arizona

=== Internet ===
==== Video ====
Live video of games was available for streaming through the following means:

- NCAA March Madness Live (website and app, no CBS games on digital media players; access to games on Turner channels requires TV Everywhere authentication through provider)
- CBS All Access (only CBS games, service subscription required)
- CBS Sports website and app (only CBS games)
- Bleacher Report website and Team Stream app (only Turner games, access requires subscription)
- Watch TBS website and app (only TBS games, requires TV Everywhere authentication)
- Watch TNT website and app (only TNT games, requires TV Everywhere authentication)
- Watch truTV website and app (only truTV games, requires TV Everywhere authentication)
- Websites and apps of cable, satellite, and OTT providers of CBS & Turner (access requires subscription)

==== Audio ====
Live audio of games was available for streaming through the following means:

- NCAA March Madness Live (website and app)
- Westwood One Sports website
- TuneIn (website and app)
- Websites and apps of Westwood One Sports affiliates

== See also ==
- 2017 NCAA Division II men's basketball tournament
- 2017 NCAA Division III men's basketball tournament
- 2017 NCAA Division I women's basketball tournament
- 2017 NCAA Division II women's basketball tournament
- 2017 NCAA Division III women's basketball tournament
- 2017 National Invitation Tournament
- 2017 Women's National Invitation Tournament
- 2017 NAIA Division I men's basketball tournament
- 2017 NAIA Division II men's basketball tournament
- 2017 College Basketball Invitational
- 2017 CollegeInsider.com Postseason Tournament
