= Riesen Ludwigsburg =

Professional basketball team in Ludwigsburg, Germany

MHP Riesen Ludwigsburg
- Leagues: Basketball Bundesliga
- Founded: 1960; 66 years ago
- History: DJK Ludwigsburg; 1960–1970; SpVgg 07 Ludwigsburg; 1970–1987; BSG Basket Ludwigsburg; 1987–2012; Riesen Ludwigsburg; 2012–present
- Arena: MHP Arena
- Capacity: 5,325
- Location: Ludwigsburg, Germany
- Team colors: Black, yellow
- Main sponsor: Mieschke Hofmann und Partner
- President: Alexander Reil
- Head coach: Carles Duran
- Retired numbers: 1 (4)
- Website: www.mhp-riesen-ludwigsburg.de
Home	Away	Third

BG Ludwigsburg, known as MHP Riesen Ludwigsburg (English: Giants Ludwigsburg) for sponsorship reasons, is a professional basketball club based in Ludwigsburg, Germany. The club currently plays in the Basketball Bundesliga (BBL), the first tier of basketball in Germany.

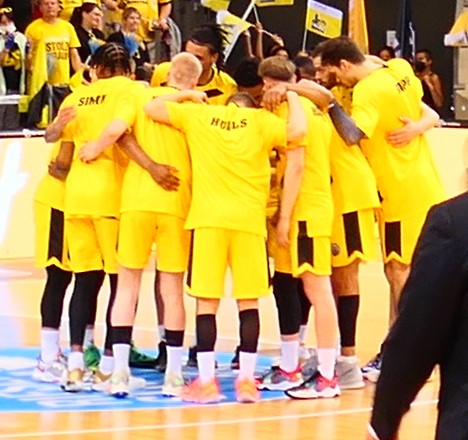
Huddle at a 2021–22 Champions League game

Founded in 1960 as DJK Ludwigsburg, the club has been a regular in the BBL since the 1986–87 season, when the team promoted from the second division 2. Basketball Bundesliga. Between the period 1970–2012, the team was also known as SpVgg 07 Ludwigsburg and BSG Basket, before changing its name at the end of the sponsorship agreement with EnBW.

== History ==
The team was founded in 1960 as the basketball section of the multi-sports club DJK Ludwigsburg. In the 1979–80 season, the team promoted for the first time to the highest tier, the Basketball Bundesliga. From 1970 until 1987, the club was known as SpVgg 07, as it was part of the multi-sports club SpVgg Ludwigsburg. In 1987, the team separated from SpVgg and was renamed BSG Basket Ludwigsburg.

In 2008, Ludwigsburg reached the German Cup Final for the first time, but lost to Artland Dragons, 60–74.

In the 2016–17 season, Ludwigsburg participated in the inaugural Basketball Champions League (BCL) season, where they were eliminated by one point on aggregate in the quarter-finals by Banvit. The campaign marked Ludwigsburg's best European performance in history, as it was the first time the team reached the knock-out phase of a European competition. In the 2017–18 season, Ludwigsburg set a new European club record when it advanced to the Final Four of the Champions League, after defeating Oldenburg and Bayreuth in the 16th round and quarter-finals. This was the first time ever the club qualified for the final stage of a European tournament. Ludwigsburg lost in the semi-final to Monaco, 65–87. In the third-place game, the team lost 74–85 to UCAM Murcia, finishing fourth.

On 19 July 2019, David McCray announced his retirement and his number 4 was retired by Riesen, the first retired number in club history.

The 2019–20 season was altered due to the COVID-19 pandemic. In a final tournament behind closed doors in Munich, Ludwigsburg reached its first German finals ever. In the finals, it lost to Alba Berlin on aggregate in two games.

== Arenas ==
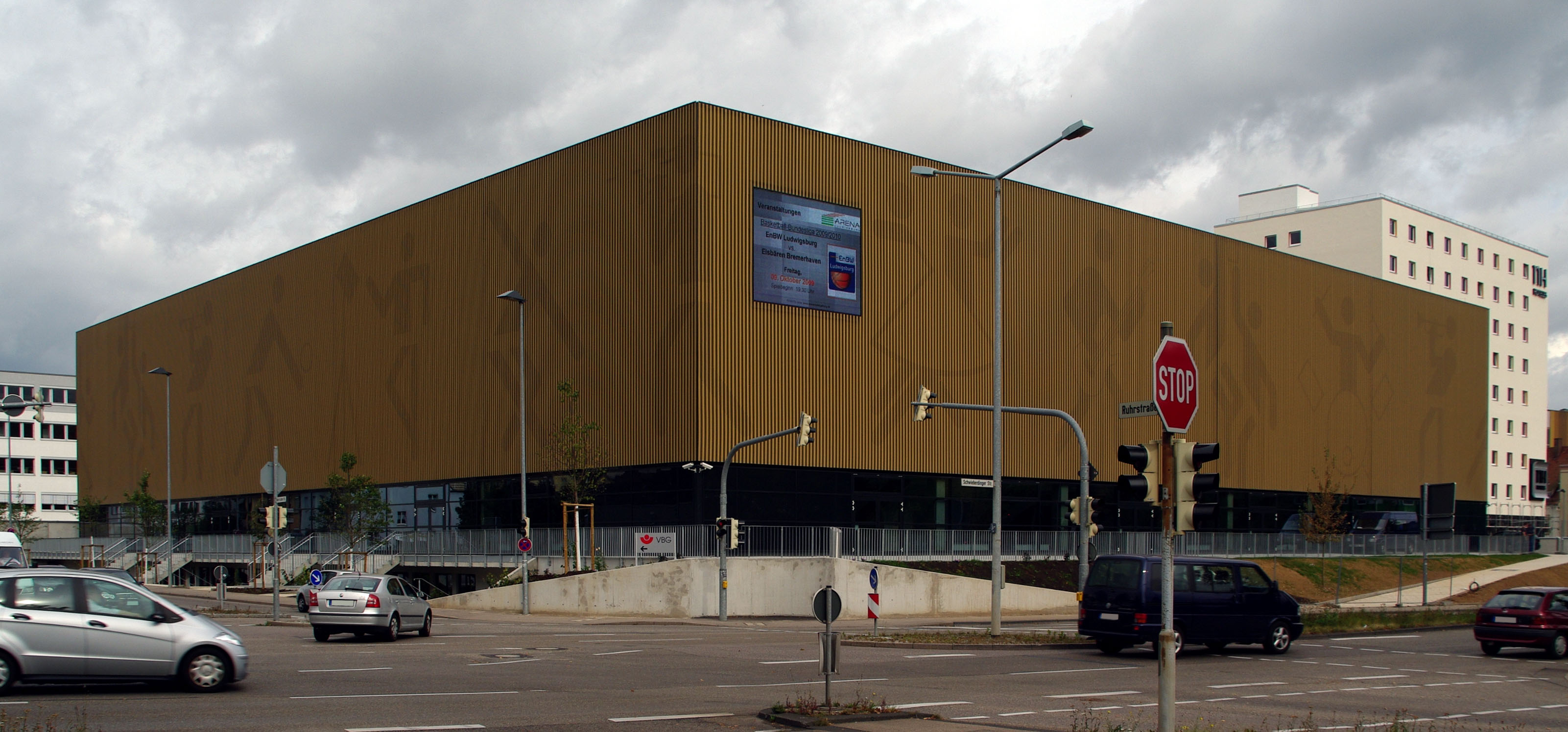
The MHP Arena is the home arena of the club since 2009.

Ludwigsburg's home arena, since 2009, is Arena Ludwigsburg, later renamed the MHP Arena, after they moved from Rundsporthalle Ludwigsburg.

== Naming ==
Partly due to sponsorship reasons, the team has known various names in its history:

- DJK Ludwigsburg (1960–1970)
- SpVgg 07 Ludwigsburg (1970–1987)
- BG Ludwigsburg (1987)
- BSG Basket Ludwigsburg (1987–2012)
- EnBW Ludwigsburg (2012)
- Neckar Riesen Ludwigsburg (2012–2014)
- MHP Riesen Ludwigsburg (2014–present)

== Logos ==
Logo of Neckar Riesen Ludwigsburg (2012–2014)

== Honours ==
=== Domestic competitions ===
- Basketball Bundesliga
  - Runners-up: 2019–20
- BBL-Pokal
  - Runners-up: 1992, 2008
- 2. Basketball Bundesliga
  - Champions: 1979-80, 1985-86, 2001-02

=== European competitions ===
- Basketball Champions League
  - Third place: 2021–22
  - Fourth place: 2017–18
  - Final Four: 2018, 2022

== Season by season ==
Season	Tier	League	Pos.	German Cup	European competitions	
1985–86	2	2. BBL	1st			
1986–87	1	Bundesliga	10th			
1987–88	1	Bundesliga	8th			
1988–89	1	Bundesliga	6th			
1989–90	1	Bundesliga	7th		3 Korać Cup	R1
1990–91	1	Bundesliga	7th		3 Korać Cup	R2
1991–92	1	Bundesliga	1st		3 Korać Cup	R3
1992–93	1	Bundesliga	3rd		3 Korać Cup	R32
1993–94	1	Bundesliga	5th		3 Korać Cup	R1
1994–95	1	Bundesliga	5th			
1995–96	1	Bundesliga	12th			
1996–97	1	Bundesliga	14th			
1997–98	2	2. BBL	5th			
1998–99	2	2. BBL	2nd			
1999–00	3	Regionalliga	1st			
2000–01	2	2. BBL	5th			
2001–02	2	2. BBL	1st			
2002–03	1	Bundesliga	12th			
2003–04	1	Bundesliga	13th			
2004–05	1	Bundesliga	8th	Third position		
2005–06	1	Bundesliga	6th			
2006–07	1	Bundesliga	2nd	Third position		
2007–08	1	Bundesliga	13th	Runner-up	2 ULEB Cup	RS
2008–09	1	Bundesliga	11th			
2009–10	1	Bundesliga	11th			
2010–11	1	Bundesliga	9th			
2011–12	1	Bundesliga	16th			
2012–13	1	Bundesliga	17th			
2013–14	1	Bundesliga	8th			
2014–15	1	Bundesliga	8th			
2015–16	1	Bundesliga	6th		2 Eurocup	R32
2016–17	1	Bundesliga	8th	Semi-finalist	Champions League	QF
2017–18	1	Bundesliga	3rd	Qualifying round	Champions League	4th
2018–19	1	Bundesliga	10th	Round of 16	Champions League	RS
2019–20	1	Bundesliga	2nd	Round of 16		
2020–21	1	Bundesliga	3rd	Group stage		
2021–22	1	Bundesliga	4th	Round of 16	Champions League	3rd
2022–23	1	Bundesliga	4th	Semi-finalist	Champions League	PI
2023–24	1	Bundesliga	8th	Round of 16	Champions League	QF
2024–25	1	Bundesliga	11th	Round of 16	FIBA Europe Cup	QF
2025–26	1	Bundesliga	10th	Round of 16		
2026–27	1	Bundesliga		Round of 16		

== Players ==
=== Current roster ===
Note: Flags indicate national team eligibility at FIBA-sanctioned events. Players may hold other non-FIBA nationalities not displayed.

MHP Riesen Ludwigsburg roster
Players
Coaches

Pos.	No.	Nat.	Name	Ht.	Wt.	Age
G/F	0	(Germany)	Drews, Oshane	1.96 m (6 ft 5 in)	66 kg (146 lb)	25 – 1 April 2001
PG	1	(United States)	Kier, Justin	1.93 m (6 ft 4 in)	88 kg (194 lb)	28 – 30 May 1998
PF	2	(United States)	Joplin, David	2.00 m (6 ft 7 in)	102 kg (225 lb)	24 – 18 November 2002
PG	3	(Germany)	Tchouaffe, Yohann	1.93 m (6 ft 4 in)	84 kg (185 lb)	17 – 29 June 2009
G	5	(United States)	Leggett, Ish	1.87 m (6 ft 2 in)	84 kg (185 lb)	25 – 15 June 2001
F	7	(United States)	Hughes, Elijah	1.96 m (6 ft 5 in)	98 kg (216 lb)	28 – 10 March 1998
PF	8	(Germany)	Youdom, Kénan	2.00 m (6 ft 7 in)	95 kg (209 lb)	17 – 30 October 2009
G/F	10	(Germany)	Danziger, Lars	1.92 m (6 ft 4 in)	85 kg (187 lb)	18 – 11 January 2008
SG	11	(United States)	Perry, Darius	1.88 m (6 ft 2 in)	84 kg (185 lb)	27 – 13 March 1999
F	12	(United States)	Cartier, Patrick	2.03 m (6 ft 8 in)	100 kg (220 lb)	26 – 12 June 2000
F	13	(Cuba)	Polas Bartolo, Yorman	1.91 m (6 ft 3 in)	88 kg (194 lb)	41 – 8 August 1985
C	15	(Germany)	Mack, Danny	2.05 m (6 ft 9 in)	103 kg (227 lb)	21 – 18 July 2005
G	17	(Germany)	Baumer, Julis	1.95 m (6 ft 5 in)	86 kg (190 lb)	19 – 4 January 2007
C	18	(Germany)	Wohlfarth-Bottermann, Jonas	2.08 m (6 ft 10 in)	105 kg (231 lb)	36 – 20 February 1990
PG	22	(Germany)	Riedel, Max	1.98 m (6 ft 6 in)	84 kg (185 lb)	20 – 16 November 2006
F	24	(France)	Dongmo-Temoka, Maxwell	1.98 m (6 ft 6 in)	101 kg (223 lb)	23 – 27 June 2003
PG	25	(Germany)	Tomas Duarte, Lino	1.90 m (6 ft 3 in)	66 kg (146 lb)	22 – 2 November 2004
F	32	(United States)	Kellman, Keeshawn	2.03 m (6 ft 8 in)	111 kg (245 lb)	26 – 19 August 2000
F/C	38	(Slovenia)	Modić, Lukas	2.01 m (6 ft 7 in)	101 kg (223 lb)	21 – 3 July 2005
C	42	(United States)	Rutherford, Tommy	2.04 m (6 ft 8 in)	109 kg (240 lb)	29 – 9 January 1997

Head coach

- (Spain) Carles Duran

Assistant coach(es)

- (Spain) Jandro Zubillaga
- (Spain) Jordi Saltó
- (South Korea) Kheeryoung Rhee

Legend

- (C) Team captain
- Injured

- Roster
Updated: September 26, 2026

=== Depth chart ===
Pos.	Starting 5	Bench 1	Bench 2	Bench 3
C	Jonas Wohlfarth-Bottermann	Tommy Rutherford	Danny Mack	Lukas Modić
PF	Yorman Polas Bartolo	David Joplin	Maxwell Dongmo-Temoka	Patrick Cartier
SF	Elijah Hughes	Keeshawn Kellman	Lars Danziger	Oshane Drews
SG	Darius Perry	Ish Leggett	Julis Baumer	Kénan Youdom
PG	Justin Kier	Yohann Tchouaffe	Max Riedel	Lino Tomas Duarte

=== Retired numbers ===
Riesen Ludwigsburg retired numbers
No.	Nat.	Player	Position	Tenure	Ref.
4	(Germany)	David McCray	PG	2007–2012, 2015–2019	

=== Other notable players ===
- Set a club record or won an individual award as a professional player.
- Played at least one official international match for his senior national team at any time.

- (Germany) Karim Jallow
- (Germany) Konstantin Konga
- (Germany) Jens Kujawa
- (Israel) (Trinidad and Tobago) (United States) Khadeen Carrington
- (Estonia) Siim-Sander Vene
- (Finland) Shawn Huff
- (Japan) Takumi Ishizaki
- (Lithuania) Andrius Giedraitis
- (Lithuania) Donatas Zavackas
- (Lithuania) Povilas Čukinas
- (New Zealand) Sam Waardenburg
- (United Kingdom) Matthew Bryan-Amaning
- (United States) Will Cherry
- (United States) Walter Palmer
- (United States) Jerry Green
- (United States) Coby Karl
- (United States) D. J. Kennedy
- (United States) Marcos Knight
- (United States) Royce O'Neale
- (United States) Mustafa Shakur
- (United States) Jaleen Smith
- (United States) Isaiah Whitehead
- (United States) Jacob Wiley
