= Big East Conference Men's Basketball Sixth Man of the Year =

- Awarded for: the best reserve basketball player in the Big East Conference
- Country: United States

History
- First award: 2008
- Most recent: Devin Askew, Villanova

The Big East Conference Men's Basketball Sixth Man of the Year award is given to the men's basketball player in the Big East Conference voted as the best reserve player by the conference coaches. It was first awarded at the end of the 2007–08 season.

== Key ==
Player (X)	Denotes the number of times the player had been awarded the Big East Sixth Man of the Year award at that point

== Winners ==
Season	Player	School	Position	Class	Reference
2007–08	Patrick Ewing Jr.	Georgetown	F	Senior	
2008–09	Corey Fisher	Villanova	G	Sophomore	
2009–10	Kris Joseph	Syraacuse	F	Sophomore	
2010–11	Justin Burrell	St. John's	F	Senior	
2011–12	Dion Waiters	Syracuse	G	Sophomore	
2012–13	Davante Gardner	Marquette	F	Junior	
2013–14	Davante Gardner (2)	Marquette	F	Senior	
2014–15	Josh Hart	Villanova	G	Sophomore	
2015–16	J. P. Macura	Xavier	G	Sophomore	
2016–17	Andrew Rowsey	Marquette	G	Junior	
2017–18	Donte DiVincenzo	Villanova	G	Sophomore	
2018–19	Paul Jorgensen	Butler	G	Senior	
2019–20	Denzel Mahoney	Creighton	G	Junior	
2020–21	Tyler Polley	UConn	F	Senior	
2021–22	Jared Bynum	Providence	G	Junior	
2022–23	David Joplin	Marquette	F	Sophomore	
2023–24	Hassan Diarra	UConn	G	Senior	
2024–25	Tarris Reed	UConn	F	Junior	
2025–26	Devin Askew	Villanova	G	Graduate	
