= David McCray =

German basketball player and coach

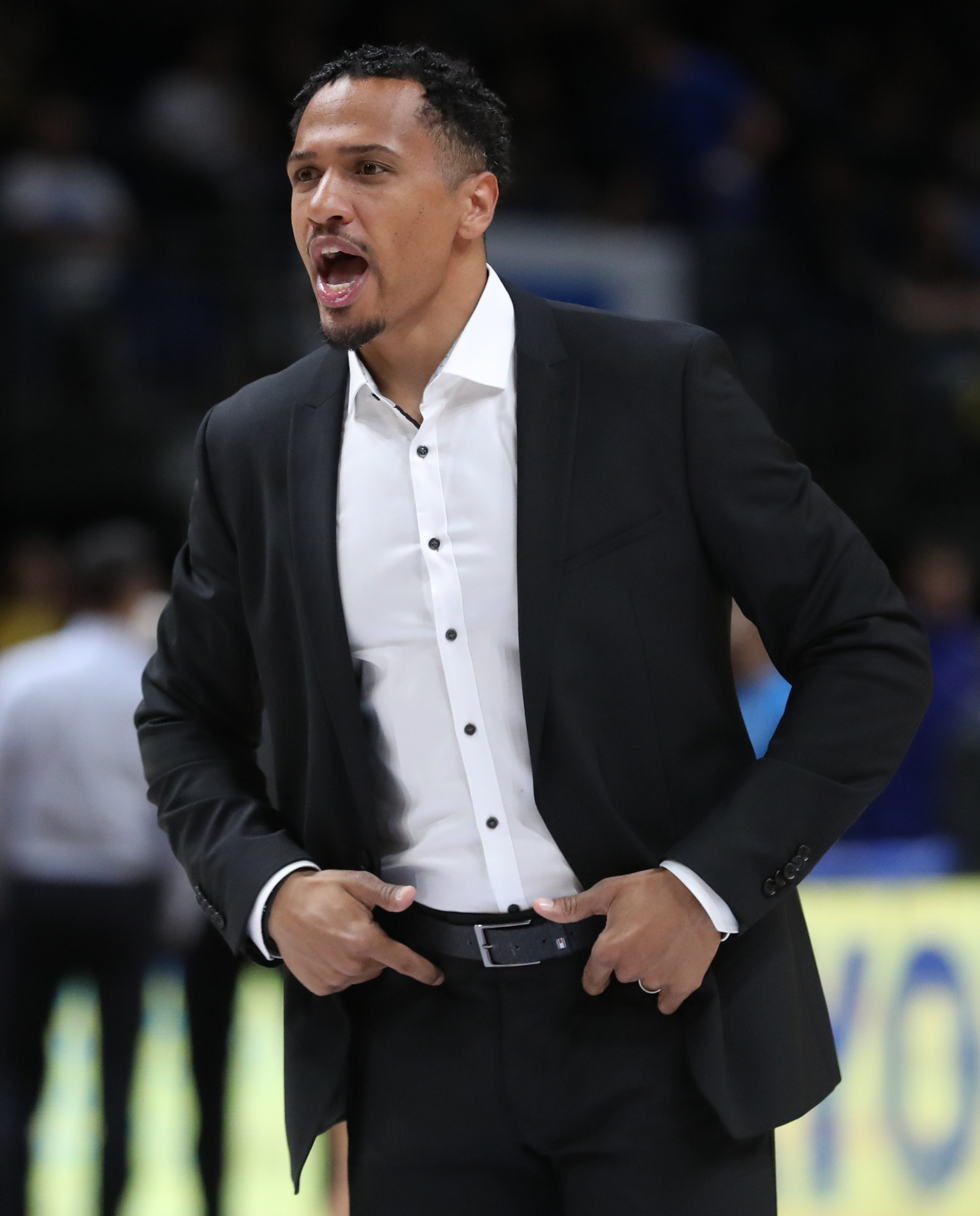
- McCray (2022)

Crailsheim Merlins
- Title: Head coach
- League: ProA

Personal information
- Born: 6 November 1986 (age 40) Speyer, West Germany
- Listed height: 6 ft 2 in (1.88 m)
- Listed weight: 187 lb (85 kg)

Career information
- Playing career: 2003–2019
- Position: Point guard
- Number: 4

Career history

Playing
- 2003–2004: Kaiserslautern Braves
- 2004–2007: BG Karlsruhe
- 2007–2008: Kirchheim Knights
- 2007–2012: EnBW Ludwigsburg
- 2012–2014: Telekom Baskets Bonn
- 2014–2015: Artland Dragons
- 2015–2019: Riesen Ludwigsburg

Coaching
- 2019–2024: Riesen Ludwigsburg (assistant)
- 2024–present: Crailsheim Merlins

Career highlights
- No. 4 retired by Riesen Ludwigsburg

David McCray (born 6 November 1986) is a German professional basketball coach and former player. Standing at 1.88 m (6 ft 2 in), he mainly played as point guard. He is the current Head coach for Crailsheim Merlins of the German ProA.

His number 4 was retired by Riesen Ludwigsburg.

== Early life ==
David McCray's father is from the United States, his mother from Germany.

== Professional career ==
In June 2014, he signed a 1-year deal with an option for another year with Artland Dragons. He previously played for Telekom Baskets Bonn.

On 19 July 2019, McCray announced his retirement. Riesen Ludwigsburg retired his jersey number 4, its first retired number in club history.

== Coaching career ==
Following his retirement, he assumed the function of assistant coach with Riesen Ludwigsburg.

On May 30, 2024, he signed with Crailsheim Merlins of the German ProA for his first head coaching experience.
