= Davante Gardner =

American basketball player (born 1991)

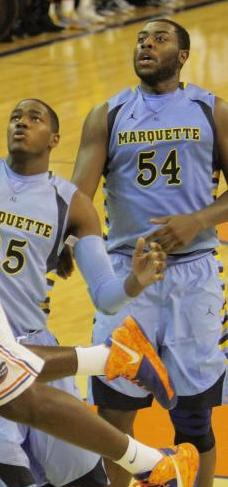
- Gardner (#54) at Marquette in 2012

No. 54 – SeaHorses Mikawa
- Position: Power forward
- League: B.League

Personal information
- Born: September 2, 1991 (age 35) Suffolk, Virginia, U.S.
- Listed height: 6 ft 8 in (2.03 m)
- Listed weight: 290 lb (132 kg)

Career information
- High school: King's Fork (Suffolk, Virginia)
- College: Marquette (2010–2014)
- NBA draft: 2014: undrafted
- Playing career: 2014–present

Career history
- 2014–2015: HTV
- 2015–2016: Nishinomiya Storks
- 2016–2019: Niigata Albirex BB
- 2019–present: SeaHorses Mikawa

Career highlights
- Big East Conference Sixth Man of the Year (2013, 2014); French 2nd Division MVP (2015); All-Japanese League First Team (2019); 3× Japanese League Scoring leader (2018, 2019. 2020); Japanese League All-Star (2019); Japanese NBL All-Star Game MVP (2016); Japanese NBL scoring leader (2016)

Davante Gardner (born September 2, 1991) is an American professional basketball player for SeaHorses Mikawa in Japan. He played college basketball at Marquette University, where he received the Big East Conference Sixth Man of the Year award twice, in 2013 and 2014.

== College statistics ==
| Year | Team | GP | GS | MPG | FG% | 3P% | FT% | RPG | APG | SPG | BPG | PPG |
|---|---|---|---|---|---|---|---|---|---|---|---|---|
| 2010–11 | Marquette | 33 | 0 | 9.0 | .576 | – | .754 | 2.2 | 0.3 | 0.1 | 0.2 | 4.6 |
| 2011–12 | Marquette | 27 | 11 | 19.1 | .561 | .000 | .755 | 5.3 | 0.7 | 0.8 | 0.2 | 9.5 |
| 2012–13 | Marquette | 35 | 0 | 21.4 | .585 | .200 | .835 | 4.8 | 0.9 | 0.7 | 0.6 | 11.5 |
| 2013–14 | Marquette | 32 | 8 | 26.6 | .528 | .125 | .781 | 5.7 | 1.3 | 0.3 | 0.5 | 14.9 |
| Total | | 127 | 19 | 19.0 | .557 | .130 | .790 | 4.5 | 0.8 | 0.5 | 0.4 | 10.1 |

== Career statistics ==
Legend
| GP | Games played | GS | Games started | MPG | Minutes per game |
| FG% | Field goal percentage | 3P% | 3-point field goal percentage | FT% | Free throw percentage |
| RPG | Rebounds per game | APG | Assists per game | SPG | Steals per game |
| BPG | Blocks per game | PPG | Points per game | **Bold** | Career high |

| * | Led the league |

| Year | Team | GP | GS | MPG | FG% | 3P% | FT% | RPG | APG | SPG | BPG | PPG |
|---|---|---|---|---|---|---|---|---|---|---|---|---|
| 2014–15 | Hyères-Toulon Var | 36 | 33 | 27.9 | .608 | .364 | .836 | 6.75 | 1.03 | 0.89 | 0.47 | 15.83 |
| 2015–16 | Nishinomiya | 54 | 53 | 36.6 | .523 | .356 | .756 | 10.6 | 1.9 | 1.1 | 0.6 | 27.8 |
| 2016–17 | Niigata | 54 | 51 | 26.7 | .553 | .303 | .780 | 8.8 | 1.7 | 0.8 | 0.5 | 21.9 |
| 2017–18 | Niigata | 59 | 59 | 30.0 | .570 | .295 | .843 | 10.0 | 2.5 | 0.8 | 0.6 | 28.7 |
| 2018–19 | Niigata | 60 | 60 | 36.0 | .576 | .228 | .793 | 10.9 | 3.8 | 0.6 | 0.4 | 27.6 |
