= Rundsporthalle Ludwigsburg =

Indoor arena in Ludwigsburg, Germany

Coordinates: 48.900°N 9.178°E

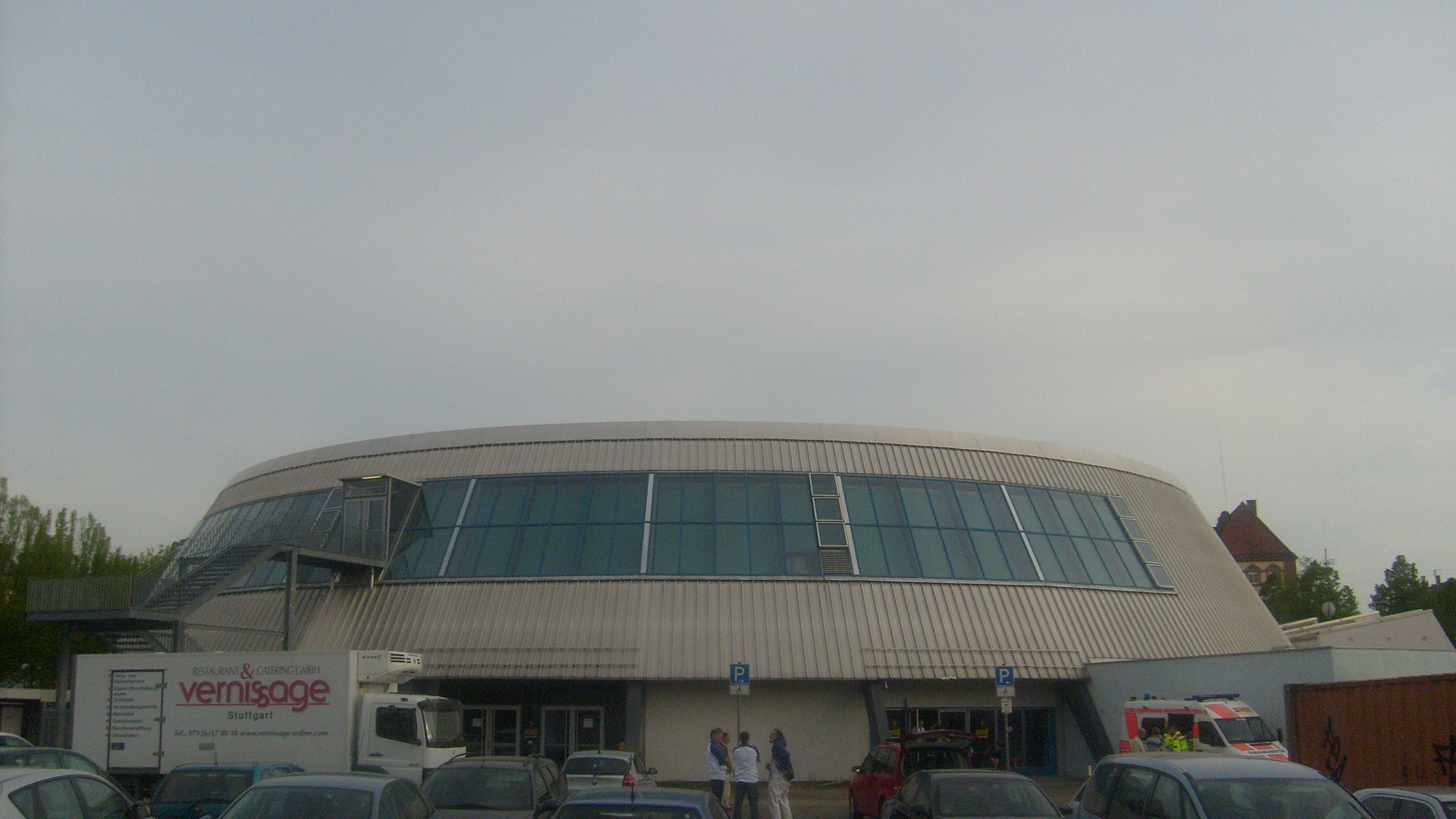
Rundsporthalle Ludwigsburg arena

Rundsporthalle is an indoor sporting arena located in Ludwigsburg, Germany. The capacity of the arena is 3,008 people. It was the home to the EnBW Ludwigsburg basketball team prior to the Arena Ludwigsburg opened in the year 2009. Since then, the hall has mainly been used for home games of the youth and women’s teams of BSG Basket Ludwigsburg. In 2014, some parts of the arena were renovated for approximately €700,000, including a facade redesign, new washrooms, and updated fire protection.

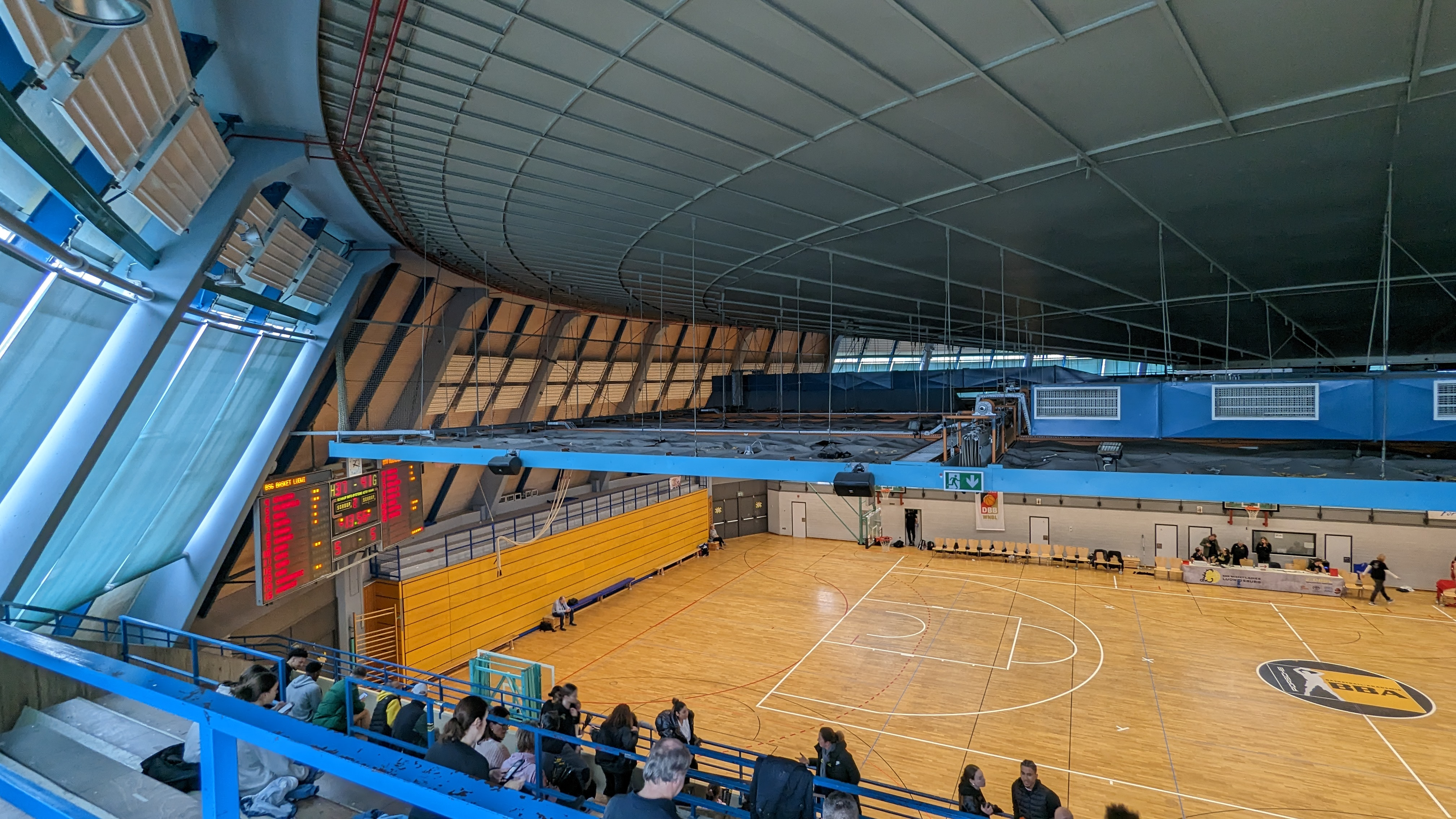
Rundsporthalle Ludwigsburg 2023

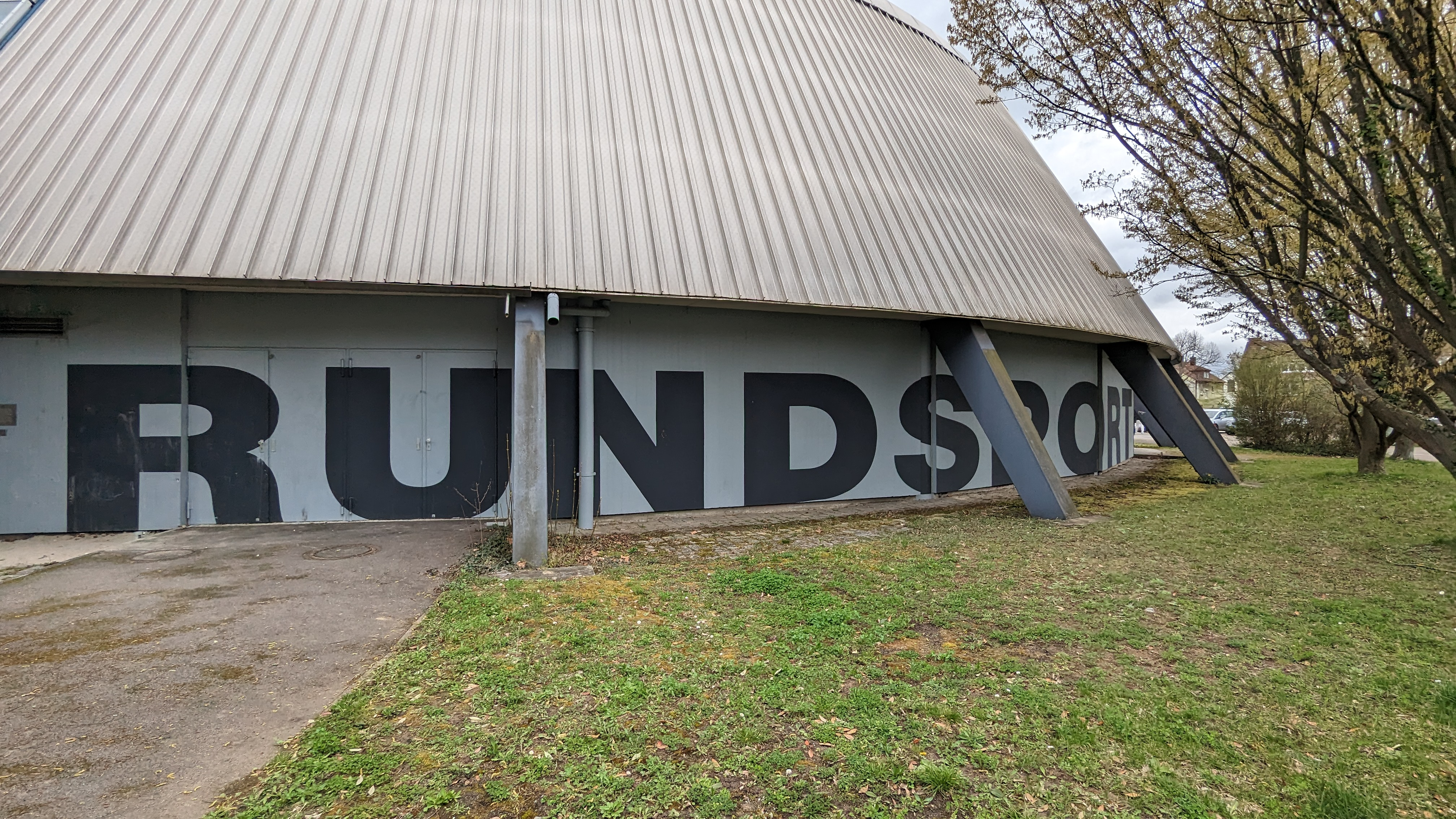
Rundsporthalle Ludwigsburg 2023
