= 2017 NCAA Division III women's basketball tournament =

- Teams: 64
- Finals site: Van Noord Arena, Grand Rapids, Michigan
- Champions: Amherst Lord Jeffs (2nd title)
- Runner-up: Tufts Jumbos (2nd title game)
- Semifinalists: Christopher Newport Captains (2nd Final Four); St. Thomas (MN) Tommies (6th Final Four)
- Winning coach: G.P. Gromacki (1st title)
- MOP: Ali Doswell (Amherst)
- Attendance: 33,182

The 2017 NCAA Division III women's basketball tournament was the 36th annual tournament hosted by the NCAA to determine the national champion of Division III women's collegiate basketball in the United States.

Amherst defeated Tufts in the championship game, 52–29, to claim the Lord Jeffs' second Division III national title and first since 2011.

The championship rounds were hosted by Calvin University at the Van Noord Arena in Grand Rapids, Michigan.

== Bracket ==
=== Top left sectional ===
First round March 3, 2017; Regional sites
Amherst	65
Regis (MA)	37
Amherst, MA
Mary Washington	62
Sage	57
FDU Florham	58
Gwynedd Mercy	46
Florham Park, NJ
Babson	59
Messiah	53
Montclair State	81
Westfield State	73
Montclair, NJ
UMass Dartmouth	71
La Roche	64
Ithaca	65
RIT	62
Ithaca, NY
Bowdoin	61
SUNY New Paltz	62

Second round March 4, 2017; Regional sites
Amherst	60
Mary Washington	51
FDU Florham	61
Babson	62
Montclair State	63
UMass Dartmouth	71
Ithaca	80
SUNY New Paltz	83

Sectional semifinals March 10, 2017; Amherst, MA
Amherst	63
Babson	39
UMass Dartmouth	67
SUNY New Paltz	57

Sectional finals March 11, 2017; Amherst, MA
Amherst	73
UMass Dartmouth	33

=== Bottom left sectional ===
First round March 3, 2017; Regional sites
Ohio Northern	68
Lakeland	36
Ada, OH
Trine	63
Illinois Wesleyan	56
SUNY Geneseo	65
Muhlenberg	53
Geneseo, NY
Rochester (NY)	67
Keene State	55
Christopher Newport	98
Staten Island	56
Newport News, VA
Catholic	64
Lynchburg	69
Thomas More	97
Eureka	58
Crestview Hills, KY
Hope	78
UW Whitewater	71

Second round March 4, 2017; Regional sites
Ohio Northern	55
Trine	48
SUNY Geneseo	78
Rochester	72
Christopher Newport	69
Lynchburg	51
Thomas More	67
Hope	74

Sectional semifinals March 10, 2017; Ada, OH
Ohio Northern	72
SUNY Geneseo	55
Christopher Newport	79
Hope	74

Sectional finals March 11, 2017; Ada, OH
Ohio Northern	74
Christopher Newport	79

=== Top right sectional ===
First round March 3, 2017; Regional sites
St. Thomas (MN)	98
UW Superior	56
St. Paul, MN
Chicago	67
Wartburg	63
Guilford	70
Marymount (VA)	74
Greensboro, NC
Albright	64
Piedmont	54
Puget Sound	93
UC Santa Cruz	74
Tacoma, WA
Whitman	76
George Fox	72
Trinity (TX)	82
Hendrix	74
Richardson, TX
UT Dallas	63
Claremont-Mudd-Scripps	79

Second round March 4, 2017; Regional sites
St. Thomas (MN)	73
Chicago	69
Marymount	68
Albright	59
Puget Sound	67
Whitman	69
Trinity (TX)	77
Claremont-Mudd-Scripps	66

Sectional semifinals March 10, 2017; St. Paul, MN
St. Thomas (MN)	65
Marymount	48
Whitman	69
Trinity (TX)	59

Sectional finals March 11, 2017; St. Paul, MN
St. Thomas (MN)	65
Whitman	48

=== Bottom right sectional ===
First round March 3, 2017; Regional sites
Tufts	65
Saint Joseph's (ME)	44
Medford, MA
DeSales	72
Husson	74
Scranton	49
UNE	48
Scranton, PA
Eastern Conn. State	72
SUNY Poly	80
UW Oshkosh	63
Calvin	55
Oshkosh, WI
DePauw	67
Gustavus Adolphus	57
Washington St. Louis	73
St. Norbert	54
St. Louis, MO
Wheaton (IL)	57
Rose–Hulman	54

Second round March 4, 2017; Regional sites
Tufts	64
Husson	44
Scranton	76
SUNY Poly	65
UW Oshkosh	64
DePauw	49
Washington St. Louis	83
Wheaton (IL)	74

Sectional semifinals March 10, 2017; St. Louis, MO
Tufts	65
Scranton	48
UW Oshkosh	56
Washington St. Louis	68

Sectional finals March 11, 2017; St. Louis, MO
Tufts	57
Washington St. Louis	43

=== Final Four ===
Final Four; March 17, 2017; Grand Rapids, MI
Amherst	66
Christopher Newport	51
St. Thomas (MN)	57
Tufts	60

National championship March 18, 2017; Grand Rapids, MI
Amherst	52
Tufts	29

== All-tournament team ==
- Ali Doswell, Amherst
- Meredith Doswell, Amherst
- Devon Byrd, Christopher Newport
- Kaitlin Langer, St. Thomas (MN)
- Michela North, Tufts

== See also ==
- 2017 NCAA Division I women's basketball tournament
- 2017 NCAA Division II women's basketball tournament
- 2017 NAIA Division I women's basketball tournament
- 2017 NAIA Division II women's basketball tournament
- 2017 NCAA Division III men's basketball tournament
