= 2017 NAIA Division I men's basketball tournament =

College basketball tournament

- Teams: 32
- Finals site: Municipal Auditorium, Kansas City, Missouri
- Champions: Texas Wesleyan Rams (2 title, 2 title game, 4 Fab Four)
- Runner-up: Life Running Eagles (3 title game, 5 Fab Four)
- Semifinalists: Alexandria State Generals; William Penn Statesmen
- Coach of the year: Brennen Shingleton (Texas Wesleyan)
- Player of the year: Dalarian Williams (Life (Ga.))
- Charles Stevenson Hustle Award: Jonathan Beausejour (Life (Ga.))
- Chuck Taylor MVP: Dion Rogers (Texas Wesleyan)
- Attendance: 39,093
- Top scorer: Dion Rogers (Texas Wesleyan) (28 points)

The 2017 Buffalo Funds - NAIA Division I men's basketball tournament was held in March at Municipal Auditorium in Kansas City, Missouri. The 80th annual NAIA basketball tournament featured 32 teams playing in a single-elimination format. The opening game round started on March 15, and the National Championship Game was played on March 21.

== Awards and honors ==
- Leading scorer: Dion Rogers, 28 points.
- Leading rebounder:
- Frank Cramer Award: Randy Covitz, Kansas City Star
- Dr. James Naismith-Emil S. Liston Sportsmanship Award: Biola (Calif.)
- 2017 All-Tournament Team: Michael Harris, Langston (Okla.), Jonathan Beausejour, Life (Ga.), Dalarian Williams, Life (Ga.), Brandon Moss, LSU Alexandria (La.), Brian Sylvester, LSU Alexandria (La.), Ryan Harris, Texas Wesleyan, Dion Rogers, Texas Wesleyan, Najeal Young, Texas Wesleyan, Charles Knowles, William Penn (Iowa), Torren Jones, William Penn (Iowa)
- Player of the Year: Dalarian Williams (Life Ga.)
- Most consecutive tournament appearances: 26th, Georgetown (KY)
- Most tournament appearances: 36th, Georgetown (KY)

== 2017 NAIA results ==
Texas Wesleyan won their 2nd national title, defeating Life University (Ga.) 86 to 76. It was Texas Wesleyan's 13th appearance in the NAIA Tournament. It was their 4th elite eight and final four, and second title game. 2017 was the 9th straight year without a back-to-back winner. Texas Wesleyan became the 16th program to win two or more national titles with its win. Life finished the season earning its second all-time runner-up title.

== 2017 NAIA bracket ==
First round March 15–16	Second round March 17–18
1	LSU Alexandria	104
8	Science & Arts (Okla.)	80
1	LSU Alexandria (La.)	81
5	Westmont (Calif.)	61
4	William Carey (Miss.)	60
5	Westmont (Calif.)	74
NAISMITH BRACKET; March 16
3	Pikeville (Ky.)	79
6	Grand View (Iowa)	62
3	Pikeville (Ky.)	56
2	Columbia (Mo.)	51
2	Columbia (Mo.)	71
7	Lewis-Clark State (Idaho)	59
1	Carroll (Mont.)	82
8	Mount Mercy (Iowa)	69
1	Carroll (Mont.)	87*
4	SAGU (Texas)	80
4	SAGU (Texas)	80
5	Talladega (Ala.)	75
CRAMER BRACKET; March 15
3	Life (Ga.)	80
6	Martin Methodist (Tenn.)	62
3	Life (Ga.)	80
2	Hope Int'l (Calif.)	78
2	Hope Inter'l (Calif.)	61
7	Wiley (Texas)	59
1	William Penn (Iowa)	100
8	Loyola (La.)	78
1	William Penn (Iowa)	87
4	Georgetown (Ky.)	79
4	Georgetown (Ky.)	81
5	Park (Mo.)	72
DUER BRACKET; March 16
3	Biola (Calif.)	76
6	Langston (Okla.)	78
6	Langston (Okla.)	84
2	Dillard (La.)	74
2	Dillard	86
7	Oklahoma City	65
1	Dalton State (Ga.)	84
8	Harris-Stowe State (St. Louis, MO)	82
1	Dalton State (Ga.)	79
4	Montana Western	60
4	Montana Western	99
5	LSU Shreveport (La.)	94
LISTON BRACKET; March 15
3	Texas Wesleyan	74
6	Cumberlands (Ky.)	68
3	Texas Wesleyan	77
2	The Master's (Calif.)	75
2	The Master's (Calif.)	85
7	Benedictine (Kan.)	56

Quarterfinals; March 19
1	LSU Alexandria (La.)	84
3	Pikeville (Ky.)	80
1	Carroll (Mont.)	71
3	Life (Ga.)	73
1	William Penn (Iowa)	84
6	Langston (Okla.)	80
1	Dalton State (Ga.)	73
3	Texas Wesleyan	82

National Semifinals; March 20
1	LSU Alexandria (La.)	63
3	Life (Ga.)	65
1	William Penn	82
3	Texas Wesleyan	83*

National Championship; March 21
3	Life (Ga.)	76
3	Texas Wesleyan	86

- * denotes overtime.

== See also ==
- 2017 NAIA Division I women's basketball tournament
- 2017 NCAA Division I men's basketball tournament
- 2017 NCAA Division II men's basketball tournament
- 2017 NCAA Division III men's basketball tournament
- 2017 NAIA Division II men's basketball tournament
