= David Joplin =

American basketball player (born 2002)

No. 2 – Riesen Ludwigsburg
- Position: Power forward
- League: BBL

Personal information
- Born: November 18, 2002 (age 23) Milwaukee, Wisconsin, U.S.
- Listed height: 6 ft 8 in (2.03 m)
- Listed weight: 225 lb (102 kg)

Career information
- High school: Brookfield Central (Brookfield, Wisconsin)
- College: Marquette (2021–2025)
- NBA draft: 2025: undrafted
- Playing career: 2025–present

Career history
- 2025–2026: BCM Gravelines-Dunkerque
- 2026–present: Riesen Ludwigsburg

Career highlights
- Third-team All-Big East (2025); Big East Sixth Man of the Year (2023)

David Howard Joplin (born November 18, 2002) is an American professional basketball player for Riesen Ludwigsburg of the Basketball Bundesliga (BBL). He played college basketball for the Marquette Golden Eagles.

== Early life and high school ==
As a senior at Brookfield Central High School, Joplin averaged 25.6 points, 10.6 rebounds and 2.6 assists per game. He committed to play college basketball for the Marquette Golden Eagles.

== College career ==
As a freshman in 2021-22, Joplin averaged 2.8 points in 32 games played. In 2022-23, he averaged 9.2 points and 3.2 rebounds in 36 games, earning Big East Conference Sixth Man of the Year honors. Ahead of the 2023-24 season, Joplin became a full-time starter for the Golden Eagles. That season, he made 37 starts and averaged 10.8 points and 3.9 rebounds per game. On November 23, 2024, Joplin tallied a team-high 29 points in a victory over Georgia. On November 27, he dropped 27 points in a 94-59 victory against Stonehill. On December 21, Joplin passed 1,000 career points,as he scored 19 in a win versus Xavier. On January 14, 2025, he notched a career-high 30 points in an overtime win over DePaul.

== Professional career ==
=== BCM Gravelines-Dunkerque (2025–2026) ===
On August 12, 2025, Joplin signed with French team BCM Gravelines-Dunkerque of the LNB Élite.

=== Riesen Ludwigsburg (2026–present) ===
On July 31, 2026, Joplin signed a one-year deal with Riesen Ludwigsburg of the German Basketball Bundesliga (BBL).

== Career statistics ==
Legend
GP	Games played	GS	Games started	MPG	Minutes per game
FG%	Field goal percentage	3P%	3-point field goal percentage	FT%	Free throw percentage
RPG	Rebounds per game	APG	Assists per game	SPG	Steals per game
BPG	Blocks per game	PPG	Points per game	**Bold**	Career high

=== College ===
Year	Team	GP	GS	MPG	FG%	3P%	FT%	RPG	APG	SPG	BPG	PPG
2021–22	Marquette	32	0	6.9	.386	.288	.500	.9	.2	.1	.3	2.8
2022–23	Marquette	36	0	19.1	.420	**.399**	**.813**	3.2	.8	.6	.3	9.2
2023–24	Marquette	**37**	**37**	27.7	.413	.355	.681	3.9	.6	.8	**.9**	10.8
2024–25	Marquette	34	34	**31.9**	**.421**	.323	.809	**5.4**	**1.3**	**1.1**	**.9**	**14.2**
Career		139	71	21.7	.416	.349	.756	3.4	.7	.7	.6	9.4

== Personal life ==
His mother, Lisa Joplin, is a former police officer for the Milwaukee Police Department and currently works as a hair stylist. His father, Howard Joplin, was also a Milwaukee Police Department police officer and detective.
