= 2017 NAIA Division II men's basketball tournament =

College basketball tournament

- Teams: 32
- Finals site: Keeter Gymnasium; Point Lookout, Missouri
- Champions: Union College Bulldogs (1st title, 1st title game, 1st Fab Four)
- Runner-up: Cornerstone Golden Eagles (4th title game, 7th Fab Four)
- Semifinalists: Indiana Wesleyan Wildcats (3rd Fab Four); Bellevue Bruins (4th Fab Four)
- Coach of the year: Kevin Burton (Union (KY))
- Charles Stevenson Hustle Award: Mike Martin (Union (KY))
- Chuck Taylor MVP: Paul Stone (Union (KY))
- Top scorer: Kyle Steigenga (Cornerstone) (120 points)

The 2017 NAIA Division II Men’s Basketball national championship was held in March at Keeter Gymnasium in Point Lookout, Missouri. The 26th annual NAIA basketball tournament featured thirty-two teams playing in a single-elimination format. The championship game was won by the Union Bulldogs of Barbourville, KY over the Cornerstone Golden Eagles of Grand Rapids, MI by a score of 72 to 69.

== Tourney awards and honors ==
=== Individual awards ===
- Most Valuable Player: Paul Stone, Union (KY)
- Championship Hustle Award: Mike Martin, Union (KY)
- NABC/NAIA Division II Coach of the Year: Kim Elders, Cornerstone (MI)
- NAIA Division II National Coach of the Year: Kevin Burton, Union (KY)

=== 2017 NAIA Division II Men’s Basketball Championship All-Tournament Team ===
Name	School
Tyrone Sherman	Union (KY)
Mike Martin	Union (KY)
Sam Vander Sluis	Cornerstone (MI)
Cory Cox	Cornerstone (MI)
Kyle Steigenga	Cornerstone (MI)
Lane Mahurin	Indiana Wesleyan
Bob Peters	Indiana Wesleyan
Mike Cardenas	Bellevue (NE)
Nick Hilton	Bellevue (NE)
Bryan McGriff	Eastern Oregon
*Paul Stone	Union (KY)

== Bracket ==
First Round; March 8–9	Second Round; March 10
1	Union (KY) (30-3)	95
8	Aquinas (MI) (19-14)	83
1	Union (KY) (31-3)	83
5	College of Idaho (24-9)	82
4	Dakota Wesleyan (SD) (23-9)	93
5	College of Idaho (23-9)	98
NAISMITH BRACKET
3	Trinity International (IL) (28-5)	72
6	College of the Ozarks (MO) (20-9)	55
3	Trinity International (IL) (29-5)	74
7	Taylor (IN) (21-11)	72
2	Warner (FL) (26-4)	67
7	Taylor (IN) (20-11)	73
1	Indiana Wesleyan (26-7)	100
8	Corban (OR) (17-15)	87
1	Indiana Wesleyan (27-7)	77
4	Northwestern (IA) (27-6)	75
4	Northwestern (IA) (26-6)	78
5	Washington Adventist (MD) (22-6)	76
CRAMER BRACKET
3	Davenport (MI) (24-8)	70
6	Tabor (KS) (23-9)	78
6	Tabor (KS) (24-9)	88
2	Robert Morris (IL) (27-6)	82
2	Robert Morris (IL) (26-6)	86
7	West Virginia Tech (23-8)	81
1	Bethel (IN) (29-4)	104
8	Calumet (IN) (17-13)	78
1	Bethel (IN) (30-4)	104
4	Eastern Oregon (24-8)	71
4	Eastern Oregon (23-8)	92
5	IU Southeast (24-6)	90
DUER BRACKET
3	Briar Cliff (IA) (26-7)	75
6	Bellevue (NE) (22-10)	80
6	Bellevue (NE) (23-10)	78
7	York (NE) (25-9)	76
2	Rochester (MI) (29-2)	75
7	York (NE) (24-9)	85
1	Cornerstone (MI) (30-3)	89
8	Pacific Union (CA) (18-6)	83
1	Cornerstone (MI) (31-3)	66
4	Saint Francis (IN) (23-10)	58
4	Saint Francis (IN) (22-10)	100
5	Oregon Tech (24-9)	92
LISTON BRACKET
3	Northwest Christian (OR) (24-5)	91
6	Midland (NE) (21-9)	78
3	Northwest Christian (OR) (25-5)	68
2	IU East (IN) (27-7)	73
2	IU East (IN) (26-7)	84
7	Reinhardt (GA) (22-9)	74

Quarterfinals; March 11
1	Union (KY) (32-3)	98
3	Trinity International (IL) (30-5)	60
1	Indiana Wesleyan (28-7)	64
6	Tabor (KS) (25-9)	62
1	Bethel (IN) (31-4)	75
6	Bellevue (NE) (24-10)	77
1	Cornerstone (MI) (32-3)	97
2	IU East (IN) (28-7)	87

Semifinals Round; March 13
1	Union (KY) (33-3)	92
1	Indiana Wesleyan (29-7)	80
6	Bellevue (NE) (25-10)	57
1	Cornerstone (MI) (33-3)	69

Championship; March 14
1	Union (KY) (34-3)	72
1	Cornerstone (MI) (34-3)	69

* denotes game decided in overtime

== See also ==
- 2017 NAIA Division I men's basketball tournament
- 2017 NCAA Division I men's basketball tournament
- 2017 NCAA Division II men's basketball tournament
- 2017 NCAA Division III men's basketball tournament
- 2017 NAIA Division II women's basketball tournament
