= Tyler Polley =

American basketball player (born 1999)

No. 12 – Phoenix Hagen
- Position: Power forward
- League: Basketball Bundesliga

Personal information
- Born: April 7, 1999 (age 27) Miramar, Florida, U.S.
- Listed height: 6 ft 8 in (2.03 m)
- Listed weight: 215 lb (98 kg)

Career information
- High school: Sagemont (Weston, Florida)
- College: UConn (2017–2022)
- NBA draft: 2022: undrafted
- Playing career: 2022–present

Career history
- 2022–2023: PAOK Mateco
- 2023–2024: Kolossos H Hotels
- 2024: Indiana Mad Ants
- 2024–2025: Sioux Falls Skyforce
- 2025–2026: College Park Skyhawks
- 2026: Brampton Honey Badgers
- 2026–present: Phoenix Hagen

Career highlights
- Big East Sixth Man of the Year (2021)
- Stats at NBA.com
- Stats at Basketball Reference

Tyler Jacobi Polley (born April 7, 1999) is an American professional basketball player for the Phoenix Hagen of the German Basketball Bundesliga (BBL). He played college basketball for the UConn Huskies.

== High school career ==
Polley attended Sagemont School in Weston, Florida, where he played under Coach Adam Ross. He averaged 21.1 points and 8.0 rebounds per game and shot 60.0 percent from the floor as a senior, helping the team get to a 22–7 record and to the 4A Regional Final.

== College career ==
Polley played college basketball for the UConn Huskies for five seasons. He played in 135 games, starting 61 and averaged 6.8 points on 38.7 percent shooting, 1.9 rebounds and 0.4 blocks in 21.0 minutes per game. In 2021, he earned the Big East Sixth Man of the Year after scoring 7.5 points per game on 36.2 percent shooting and 2.0 rebounds in 20.7 minutes per game in 22 appearances. In his last season, he appeared in 33 games and averaged 7.6 points per game while shooting 35.0% from three point range in 20.2 minutes per game.

== Professional career ==
=== PAOK Mateco (2022–2023) ===
After going undrafted in the 2022 NBA draft, Polley signed with PAOK Mateco of the Greek Basketball League on August 13, 2022. In 40 appearances, he averaged 6.8 points on 42.7 percent shooting, 2.6 rebounds and 0.5 steals per 21.3 minutes.

=== Kolossos H Hotels (2022–2023) ===
On August 26, 2024, Polley signed with Kolossos H Hotels of the Greek Basketball League where he played in 24 games and averaged 8.8 points on 43.2 percent shooting, 4.5 rebounds and 0.7 steals in 24.7 minutes a game.

=== Indiana Mad Ants (2024) ===
On September 26, 2024, Polley signed with the Indiana Pacers, but was waived the next day. On October 27, he joined the Indiana Mad Ants, but was waived on November 13 after playing in one game.

=== Sioux Falls Skyforce (2024–2025) ===
On November 17, 2024, Polley signed with the Sioux Falls Skyforce.

=== Phoenix Hagen (2026–present) ===
On August 2, 2026, he signed with Phoenix Hagen of the German Basketball Bundesliga (BBL).

== Personal life ==
The son of Kimara and Alvin Rogers and Tommy Polley, he has a younger brother. His father, Tommy, was an All-American linebacker at Florida State and spent six seasons in the NFL with the Rams, Ravens and Saints, playing in Super Bowl XXXVI in 2002 with the Rams.
