= 2017 NAIA Division I women's basketball tournament =

- Teams: 32
- Finals site: Rimrock Auto Arena at MetraPark, Billings, Montana
- Champions: Oklahoma City Stars (9th title, 12th title game, 14th Fab Four)
- Runner-up: Lewis–Clark State Warriors (1st title game, 2nd Fab Four)
- Semifinalists: Campbellsville Tigers (2nd Fab Four); Vanguard Lions (5th Fab Four)
- Coach of the year: Bo Overton (Oklahoma City)
- Player of the year: Daniela Wallen (Oklahoma City)
- Charles Stevenson Hustle Award: Kelsey Scherder (William Woods)
- Chuck Taylor MVP: Daniela Wallen (Oklahoma City)
- Top scorer: Daniela Wallen (Oklahoma City) (122 points)

The 2017 NAIA Division I women's basketball tournament was the tournament held by the NAIA to determine the national champion of women's college basketball among its Division I members in the United States and Canada for the 2016–17 basketball season.

Oklahoma City defeated Lewis–Clark State in the championship game, 73–66, to claim the Stars' ninth NAIA national title.

The tournament was played at the Rimrock Auto Arena at MetraPark in Billings, Montana.

== Qualification ==
The tournament field remained fixed at thirty-two teams, which were sorted into four quadrants of eight teams each. Within each quadrant, teams were seeded sequentially from one to eight based on record and season performance.

The tournament continued to utilize a simple single-elimination format.

== Bracket ==
First round
1	Lindsey Wilson	63
8	Martin Methodist	52
5	Central Methodist	52
4	Biola	49
3	Columbia (MO)	53
6	Montana Western	63
7	MidAmerica Nazarene	63
2	Oklahoma City	73
2	Baker (KS)	72
7	Mobile	56
6	Talladega	75
3	Campbellsville	84
4	Our Lady of the Lake	83
5	The Master's	85
8	Rocky Mountain	52
1	Freed–Hardeman	62
1	Lewis–Clark State	59
8	William Penn	45
5	Bethel (TN)	70
4	Wayland Baptist	57
3	Lyon (AR)	71
6	Pikeville	59
7	LSU Shreveport	52
2	Westmont	57
2	Vanguard	66
7	Lindenwood Belleville	59
6	Loyola New Orleans	55
3	Montana State Northern	60
4	Benedictine (KS)	72
5	John Brown	74
8	William Woods	88
1	Shawnee State	85

Second round
1	Lindsey Wilson	89
5	Central Methodist	72
6	Montana Western	79
2	Oklahoma City	81
2	Baker (KS)	56
3	Campbellsville	73
5	The Master's	58
1	Freed–Hardeman	79
1	Lewis–Clark State	69
5	Bethel (TN)	58
3	Lyon (AR)	53
2	Westmont	65
2	Vanguard	71
3	Montana State Northern	65
5	John Brown	61
8	William Woods	64

Quarterfinals
1	Lindsey Wilson	64
2	Oklahoma City	80
3	Campbellsville	73
1	Freed–Hardeman	70
1	Lewis–Clark State	72
2	Westmont	67
2	Vanguard	71
8	William Woods	34

Semifinals
2	Oklahoma City	87
Campbellsville	78
1	Lewis–Clark State	65
2	Vanguard	41

National championship
2	Oklahoma City	73
1	Lewis–Clark State	66

== See also ==
- 2017 NAIA Division I men's basketball tournament
- 2017 NCAA Division I women's basketball tournament
- 2017 NCAA Division II women's basketball tournament
- 2017 NCAA Division III women's basketball tournament
- 2017 NAIA Division II women's basketball tournament
