= Kris Joseph =

Canadian basketball player

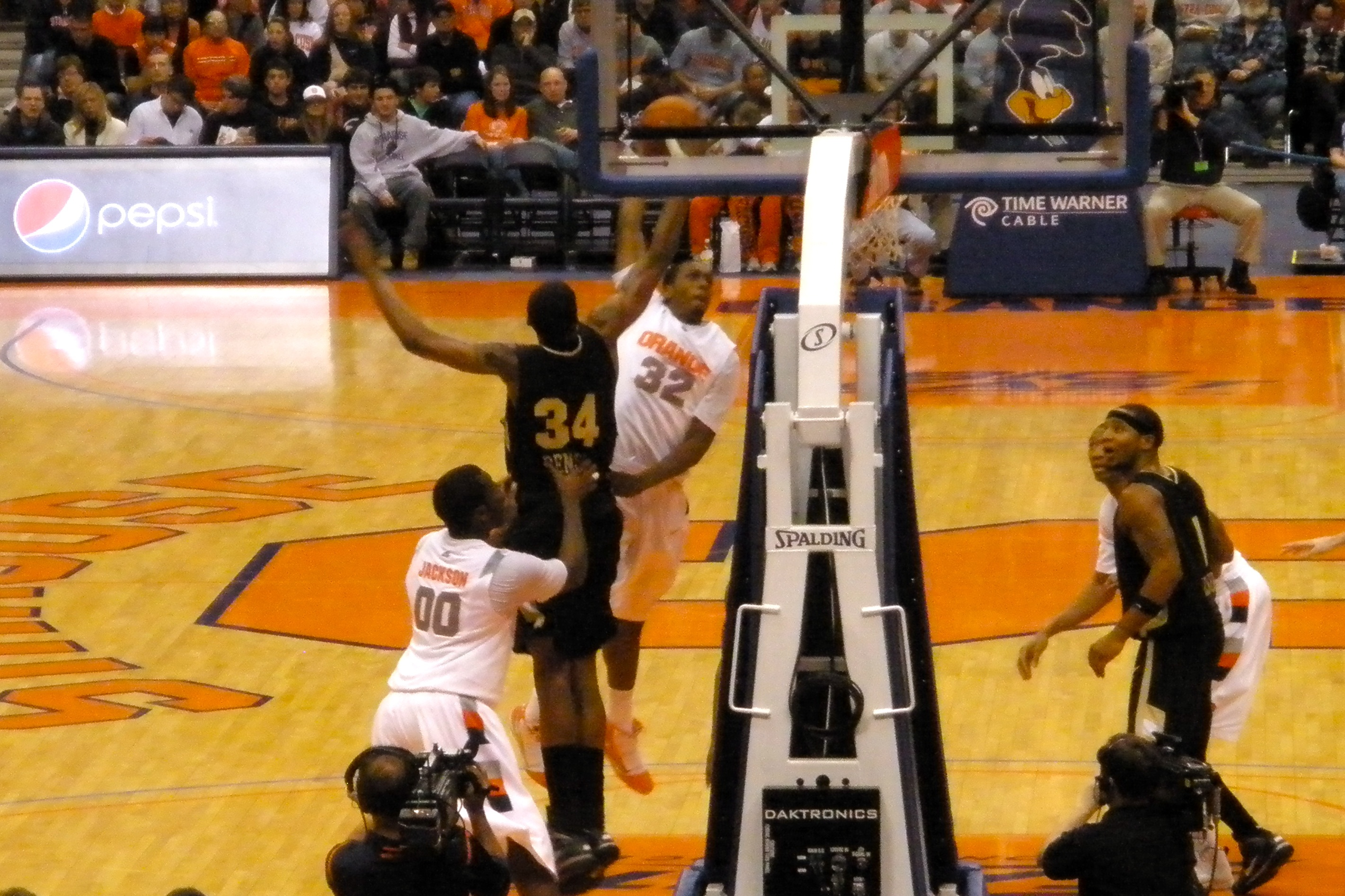
- Joseph dunk attempt

Personal information
- Born: December 17, 1988 (age 37) Montreal, Quebec, Canada
- Listed height: 6 ft 7 in (2.01 m)
- Listed weight: 210 lb (95 kg)

Career information
- High school: Archbishop Carroll (Washington, D.C.)
- College: Syracuse (2008–2012)
- NBA draft: 2012: 2nd round, 51st overall pick
- Drafted by: Boston Celtics
- Playing career: 2012–2021
- Position: Small forward
- Number: 43, 24

Career history
- 2012–2013: Boston Celtics
- 2012–2013: →Maine Red Claws
- 2013: Springfield Armor
- 2013: Brooklyn Nets
- 2013–2014: Élan Chalon
- 2014–2015: JDA Dijon
- 2015–2016: Orléans Loiret Basket
- 2016–2017: Enel Brindisi
- 2017: Élan Chalon
- 2018: Niagara River Lions
- 2018: STB Le Havre
- 2018: S.L. Benfica
- 2018–2019: Paris Basketball
- 2019–2020: ADA Blois Basket 41
- 2020: Saskatchewan Rattlers
- 2020–2021: CB Tizona
- 2021: Ottawa Blackjacks

Career highlights
- All-NBA D-League Second Team (2013); NBA D-League All-Rookie First Team (2013); Second-team All-American – NABC (2012); Big East Sixth Man of the Year (2010); First-team All-Big East (2012); Third-team All-Big East (2011)
- Stats at NBA.com
- Stats at Basketball Reference

Kristopher Carlos Joseph (born December 17, 1988) is a Canadian former professional basketball player. He played for the Syracuse Orange men's basketball team from 2008 to 2012. He was selected in the second round of the 2012 NBA draft by the Boston Celtics with the 51st pick overall. He is the older cousin of Pistons point guard Cory Joseph.

== Early years ==
Joseph was born and raised in Montreal, Quebec, where he grew up in the working-class neighbourhood of Cote-des-Neiges north of downtown. Joseph first picked up a basketball in Grade 2 but was forced to shoot on garbage cans with his older brother Maurice. A court was eventually erected in Cote-des-Neiges and the brothers battled for hours.

== High school career ==
Joseph played in Maurice's shadow for a number of years as the older star gained prominence at noted Montreal-area prep school Champlain St. Lambert College. Kris struggled at first against elite competition, getting cut from his club team at the age of 14. He worked on his game, grew to 6-foot-6 and became a star for Sun Youth, a club-team powerhouse in the Montreal Basketball League. As a tenth-grader, he led the Quebec provincial team to a silver medal at the 2005 Canada Games. He played for his high school team at Mont-Royal high school, the Mount-Royal Mustangs.

On a recommendation from youth coach Henry Wong, who thought Joseph needed an athletic and academic challenge, Joseph's mother agreed to let him leave Montreal in 2006 to complete two years of high school at Archbishop Carroll in Washington, D.C.

As a senior, Joseph led Archbishop Carroll to a 26–11 record, including a 21-point, five rebound, three assist and three block effort in the Washington Catholic Athletic Conference (WCAC) Tournament in a 65–55 win over Our Lady of Good Counsel. Joseph was also invited to play in the Baltimore All-Stars vs. U.S. All-Stars Exhibition in April. That season, Joseph would go on to earn 2008 second team honors from the Washington Post. He played AAU basketball with the DC Assault.

Considered a three-star recruit by Rivals.com, Joseph was listed as the No. 17 small forward and the No. 113 player in the nation in 2008.

== College career ==
=== 2008–09 ===
Joseph would see early playing time, including seven points in 22 minutes in an 85–51 rout of Le Moyne on November 16, 2008 and a 13-point six rebound effort in an 86–66 victory against Oakland University on November 22, 2008. On November 24, 2008, Joseph's 10 points and five rebounds helped then-unranked Syracuse upset then-No. 18 Florida, 89–83, in the semi-finals of the CBE Classic.

After an injury to Paul Harris, Joseph would receive the first start of his career against South Florida on January 2, 2009, scoring seven points and adding three rebounds.

=== 2009–10 ===
Joseph would become a key reserve in his second year at Syracuse. In SU's Big East Conference opener against Seton Hall on December 29, 2009, Joseph scored 16 points, including 8-of-9 shooting from the free throw line in an 80–73 win. On January 6, 2010, against Memphis, Joseph scored 15 second half points to go along with nine rebounds in a 74–57 win.

Joseph finished with averages of 11.0 points and 5.4 rebounds on the season, and was named the Big East Conference Sixth Man of the Year.

=== 2010–11 ===
Joseph gained national prominence as a go-to scorer for the Orange during his junior year. He was named in the Wooden Award Preseason Top 50 list and improved his numbers across the board, leading Syracuse in scoring at 14.3 points per game and placing second in rebounding (5.2) and steals (1.5). He was named to the All-Big East third team, the first Canadian to receive the honour since fellow Montrealer Bill Wennington in 1985.

=== 2011–12 ===
Joseph was once again named to the Wooden Award Preseason Top 50 list as a senior. His final season started off with a flourish as he was named the Big East Player of the Week after leading his Syracuse Orange to the NIT Season Tip Off Championship. Joseph was named Most Outstanding Player of the tournament with averages of 19.0 points, 9.5 rebounds and 3.5 steals in wins against Virginia Tech and Stanford.

He led the Orange in scoring during the regular season (13.4 ppg) and received an array of post-season awards, including a spot on the 2012 All-Big East First Team. Joseph is the first Canadian-born player ever to be named to the first team of that conference. He was named an AP Honorable Mention All-American and also earned spots on the USBWA All District II team as well as the NABC All-District 5 First Team. Additionally, Joseph was one of 15 post-season finalists for the Wooden Award, making him among the most decorated Canadians ever to play NCAA Division I basketball.

With his 15 points against Manhattan on November 14, 2011, Joseph became the 55th player at Syracuse to score 1,000 points. He concluded his storied career with 10 points, two rebounds and 3 steals in Syracuse's 77–70 loss to Ohio State in the Elite Eight.

== Professional career ==
=== Boston Celtics ===
Joseph was selected in the second round of the 2012 NBA draft by the Boston Celtics with the 51st pick. On July 3, 2012, Joseph signed a contract with the Celtics.

On July 5, 2012, the Boston Celtics announced that Joseph was added to their roster for the 2012 Orlando and Las Vegas NBA Summer League's. On October 24, Kris Joseph officially made the Celtics' 15-man roster. He was sent to the Maine Red Claws of the NBA D-League for several assignments during his time with the Celtics. On January 6, 2013, he was waived by the Celtics. On February 6, 2013, Joseph was reacquired by the Maine Red Claws.

=== Brooklyn Nets ===
On February 11, 2013, Joseph was traded to the Springfield Armor for James Mays. He signed a 10-day contract with the Brooklyn Nets on April 2, 2013. On April 12, 2013, he was signed for the remainder of the season.

Joseph was traded back to his draft team the Boston Celtics on July 12, 2013, along with Keith Bogans, Kris Humphries, MarShon Brooks and Gerald Wallace as well as three first-round picks in a blockbuster deal that sent Celtics stars Kevin Garnett, Paul Pierce and Jason Terry to the Nets. It was the first time two players named Kris were traded with each other. He was one of two players traded to the team that originally drafted them: Joseph was drafted by Boston in 2012 and Brooks was drafted by Boston in the 2011 NBA draft. On July 15, 2013, Joseph was waived by the Celtics.

=== Orlando Magic ===
In September 2013, Joseph joined the Orlando Magic for their training camp. However, he was waived on October 25.

=== France ===
On November 10, 2013, Joseph signed a contract with the French team Élan Chalon.

On June 30, 2014, JDA Dijon announced they had signed Joseph for the 2014–15 season.

On August 1, 2015, he signed with Orléans Loiret Basket for the 2015–16 season.

=== Canada ===
On February 22, 2018, Joseph signed with the Niagara River Lions of the National Basketball League of Canada. He averaged 16.2 points, 5 rebounds and 3 assists per game.

=== Portugal ===
On August 13, 2018, Joseph signed with S.L. Benfica of the Portuguese Basketball League. Shortly after, on September 17, he rescinded with the Portuguese side by mutual agreement after a severe injury.

=== Back to France ===
On September 17, 2019, Joseph signed with ADA Blois Basket 41 of the LNB Pro B.

=== Back to Canada ===
On June 10, 2021, Joseph signed with the Ottawa Blackjacks of the Canadian Elite Basketball League.

== NBA career statistics ==
Legend
GP	Games played	GS	Games started	MPG	Minutes per game
FG%	Field goal percentage	3P%	3-point field goal percentage	FT%	Free throw percentage
RPG	Rebounds per game	APG	Assists per game	SPG	Steals per game
BPG	Blocks per game	PPG	Points per game	**Bold**	Career high

=== Regular season ===
Year	Team	GP	GS	MPG	FG%	3P%	FT%	RPG	APG	SPG	BPG	PPG
2012–13	Boston	**6**	0	4.0	**.182**	.000	**.750**	**0.8**	**0.2**	0.0	0.0	**1.2**
2012–13	Brooklyn	4	0	**7.5**	.000	.000	.500	0.5	0.0	**0.8**	0.0	0.5
Career		10	0	5.4	.143	.000	.625	0.7	0.1	0.3	0.0	0.9

== See also ==
- List of Canadians in the National Basketball Association
