= Arena Ludwigsburg =

Indoor arena in Ludwigsburg, Germany

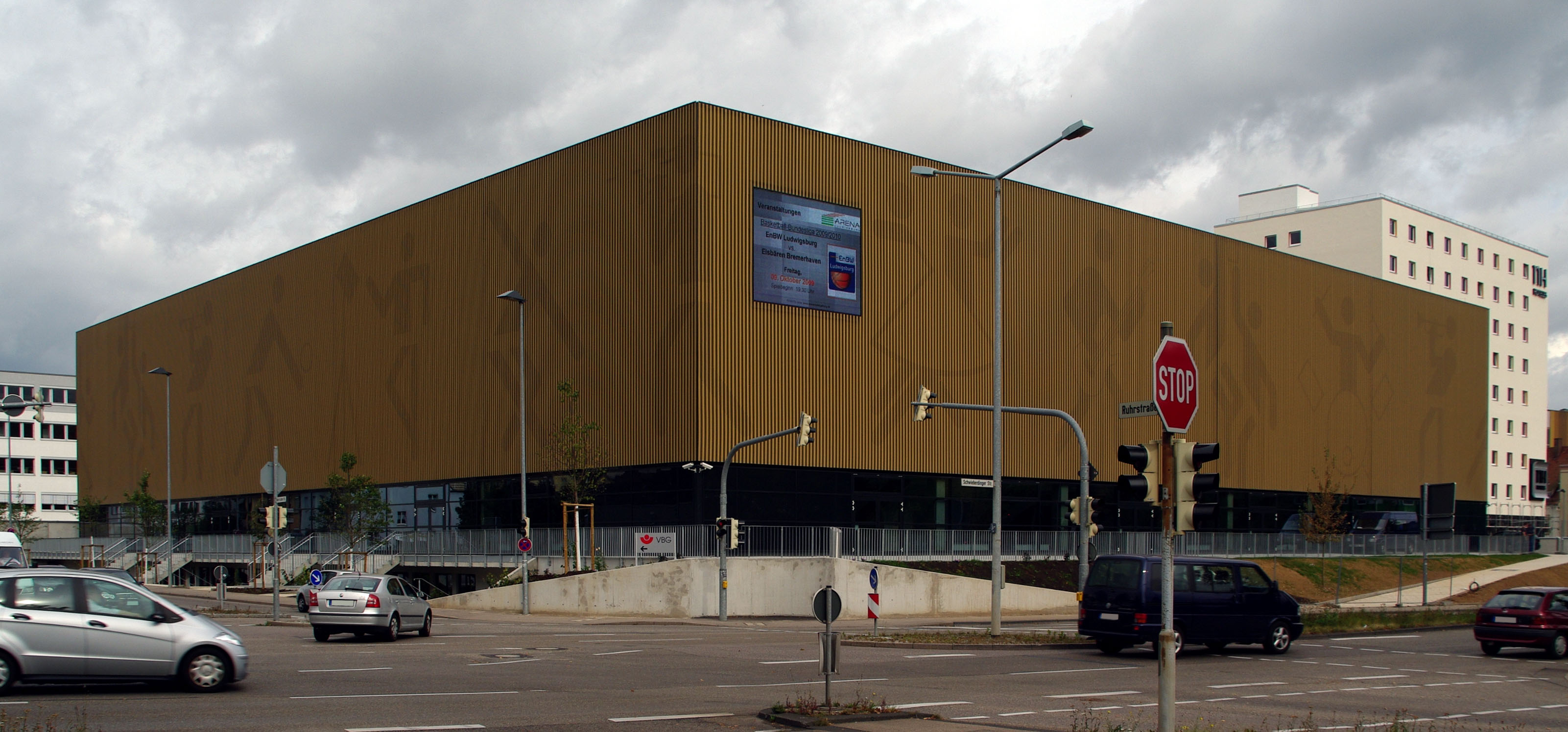
- Interactive map of Arena Ludwigsburg
- Location: Ludwigsburg, Germany
- Coordinates: 48°53′28.089237″N 9°10′57.08″E
- Capacity: 7,201 (concerts); 5,325 (basketball); 3,800 (handball)

Construction
- Groundbreaking: February 7, 2008
- Opened: October 1, 2009
- Cost: €21 million
- Architects: Planungsbuero Deyle; KS Architekten

Tenants
- MHP Riesen Ludwigsburg; SG BBM Bietigheim

Arena Ludwigsburg, also known as MHPArena, is an indoor sporting arena that is located in Ludwigsburg, Germany. The seating capacity of the arena for basketball games is 5,325 spectators.

== History ==
Arena Ludwigsburg opened on October 1st, 2009, with its first event being a concert by the hard rock group Scorpions.

On September 18, 2012, MHP, a Ludwigsburg-based subsidiary of Porsche, became the official name sponsor for the arena.

Arena Ludwigsburg has been primarily used to host basketball games, and it hosts the home games of the German professional basketball team, MHP Riesen Ludwigsburg, of the Basketball Bundesliga. It replaced Rundsporthalle Ludwigsburg as the home of EnBW Ludwigsburg.

== Gallery ==
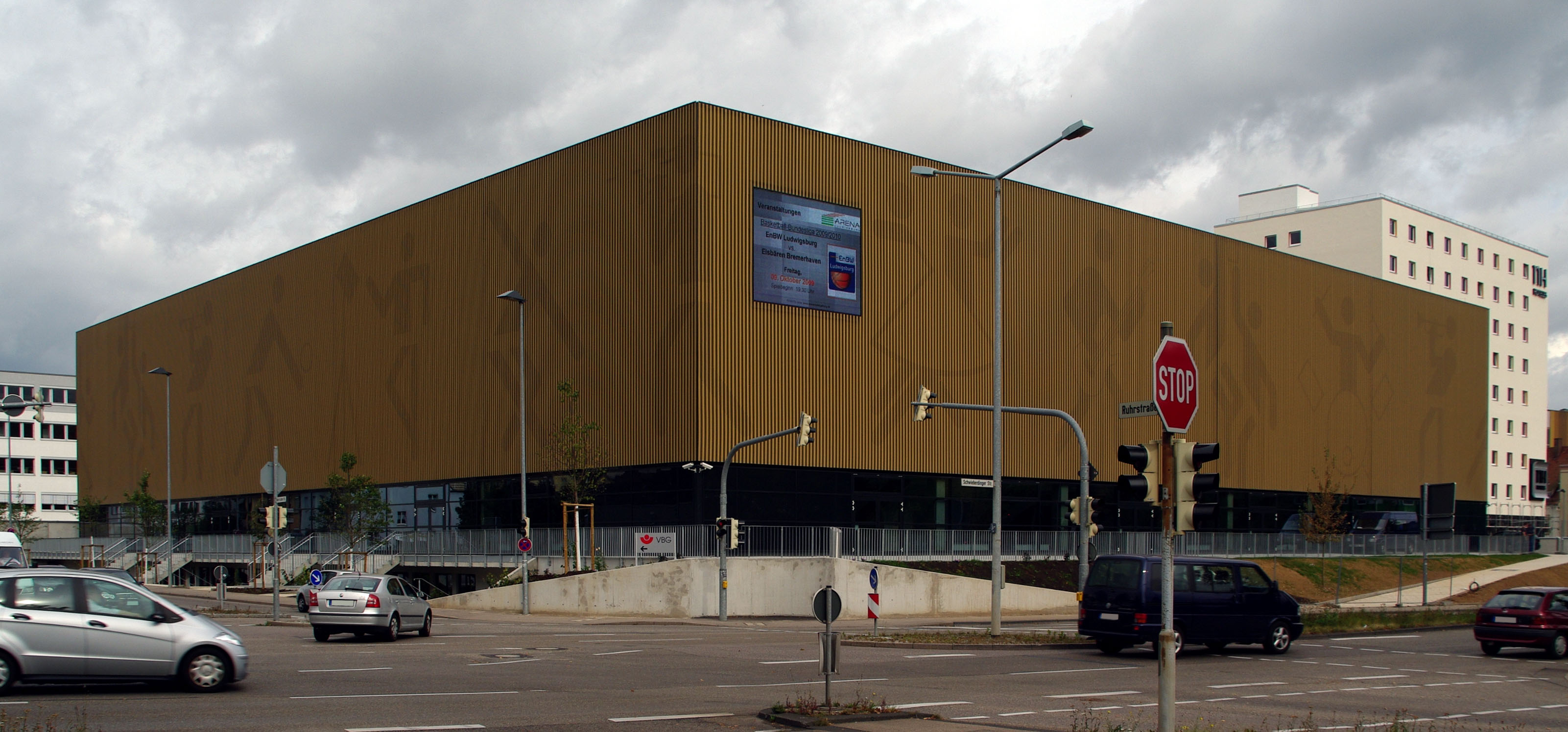

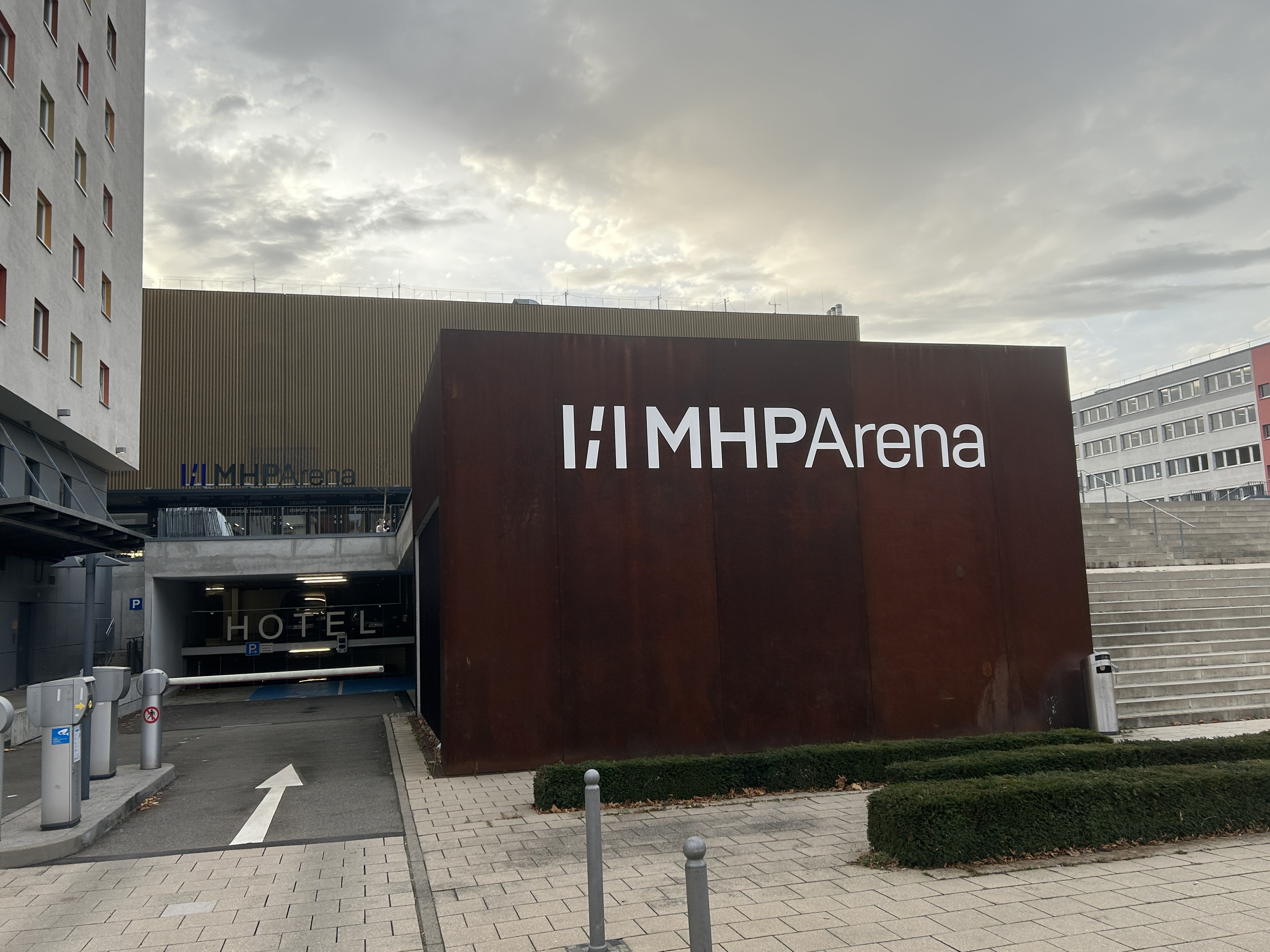

== See also ==
- List of indoor arenas in Germany
