= Van Noord Arena =

Indoor arena in Grand Rapids, Michigan

Coordinates: 42.93343°N 85.58852°W

- Interactive map of Van Noord Arena
- Address: 3195 Knight Way SE
- Location: Grand Rapids, Michigan
- Capacity: Basketball: 5,000; Concerts: 5,500

Construction
- Opened: 2009

Tenants
- Calvin Knights men's basketball (NCAA) 2009-present Calvin Knights women's basketball (NCAA) 2009-present

Van Noord Arena is a 5,000-seat indoor arena located in Grand Rapids, Michigan, part of the Spoelhof Fieldhouse complex on the campus of Calvin University. It was built in 2009 and is home to Calvin University's Knights basketball and volleyball teams, which previously played at Knollcrest Fieldhouse, which was converted into a recreational facility.

The arena contains a luxury suite that can hold 40 fans, as well as a climbing wall at the main lobby. Sixty percent of the arena's seating are chairs; the rest are bleachers. The arena can seat up to 5,500 for concerts, which moved with the basketball and volleyball teams to the new arena. The first concert was by rapper Lupe Fiasco. The new arena was built so that recording artists who have historically never played West Michigan can perform at this arena.

Spoelhof Fieldhouse accounts for 10% of the total square footage at the Calvin University campus. The total square footage of the arena is 362,000 square feet (33,600 m^{2}).
