= 2017 NCAA Division II women's basketball tournament =

- Teams: 64
- Finals site: Alumni Hall, Columbus, Ohio
- Champions: Ashland (2nd title)
- Runner-up: Virginia Union (3rd title game)
- Semifinalists: California Baptist (2nd Final Four); Harding (1st Final Four)
- Winning coach: Robin Fralick (1st title)
- MOP: Laina Snyder (Ashland)

The 2017 NCAA Division II women's basketball tournament involved 64 teams playing in a single-elimination tournament to determine the NCAA Division II women's college basketball national champion. It began on March 10, 2017, and concluded with the championship game on March 24, 2017.

The first three rounds were hosted by top-seeded teams in regional play. The eight regional winners met for the quarterfinal and semifinals, better known as the "Elite Eight" and "Final Four" respectively, and National Championship game at the Alumni Hall in Columbus, Ohio.

The Ashland Eagles completed an undefeated season by defeating Virginia Union 93–77 to finish 37–0.

== Brackets ==
=== Atlantic Regional ===
- Site: California, Pennsylvania (California (PA))

Regional Quarterfinals; Round of 64
1	California (PA)	88
8	Glenville State	86
4	Shippensburg	51
5	Mercyhurst	63
2	Indiana (PA)	59
7	Johnson C. Smith	55
3	Virginia Union	66
6	Wheeling Jesuit	58

Regional semifinals Round of 32
1	California (PA)	86
4	Mercyhurst	75
2	Indiana (PA)	58
3	Virginia Union	62

Regional finals Sweet Sixteen
1	California (PA)	69
3	Virginia Union	85

=== Central Regional ===
- Site: Searcy, Arkansas (Harding)

Regional Quarterfinals; Round of 64
1	Emporia State	71
8	Northern State	68
4	Central Oklahoma	51
5	Pittsburg State	75
2	Harding	59
7	Arkansas Tech	46
3	Minnesota State-Moorhead	45
6	Central Missouri	56

Regional semifinals Round of 32
1	Emporia State	65
5	Pittsburg State	57
2	Harding	66
6	Central Missouri	58

Regional finals Sweet Sixteen
1	Emporia State	56
2	Harding	58

=== East Regional ===
- Site: Garden City, New York (Adelphi)

Regional Quarterfinals; Round of 64
1	Adelphi	64
8	NYIT	47
4	Caldwell	52
5	Molloy	60
2	Queens (NY)	69
7	Assumption	48
3	Bentley	66
6	University of the Sciences	73

Regional semifinals Round of 32
1	Adelphi	58
5	Molloy	59
2	Queens (NY)	77
6	University of the Sciences	67

Regional finals Sweet Sixteen
5	Molloy	60
2	Queens (NY)	70

=== Midwest Regional ===
- Site: Ashland, Ohio (Ashland)

Regional Quarterfinals; Round of 64
1	Ashland	72
8	Malone	40
4	Ursuline	66
5	Grand Valley State	73
2	Drury	75
7	Bellarmine	57
3	Saginaw Valley	70
6	Lewis	66

Regional semifinals Round of 32
1	Ashland	77
5	Grand Valley State	62
2	Drury	67
3	Saginaw Valley	55

Regional finals Sweet Sixteen
1	Ashland	74
2	Drury	62

=== South Regional ===
- Site: St. Petersburg, Florida (Eckerd)

Regional Quarterfinals; Round of 64
1	Eckerd	84
8	Lee	77
4	Florida Southern	47
5	Rollins	71
2	West Florida	66
7	Nova Southeastern	57
3	Benedict	71
6	Valdosta State	60

Regional semifinals Round of 32
1	Eckerd	43
5	Rollins	55
2	West Florida	74
3	Benedict	51

Regional finals Sweet Sixteen
5	Rollins	62
2	West Florida	72

=== Southeast Regional ===
- Site: Columbus, Georgia (Columbus State)

Regional Quarterfinals; Round of 64
1	Columbus State	73
8	Anderson (SC)	62
4	Limestone	50
5	Lander	70
2	Wingate	75
7	King (TN)	55
3	Lincoln Memorial	87
6	Clayton State	58

Regional semifinals Round of 32
1	Columbus State	73
5	Lander	63
2	Wingate	66
3	Lincoln Memorial	85

Regional finals Sweet Sixteen
1	Columbus State	86
2	Lincoln Memorial	75

=== South Central Regional ===
- Site: Pueblo, Colorado (Colorado State-Pueblo)

Regional Quarterfinals; Round of 64
1	Colorado State-Pueblo	68
8	Tarleton State	59
4	West Texas A&M	75
5	Regis (CO)	67
2	Angelo State	79
7	St. Edward's	60
3	Colorado Springs	89
6	Eastern New Mexico	73

Regional semifinals Round of 32
1	Colorado State Pueblo	67
4	West Texas A&M	70
2	Angelo State	86
3	Colorado Springs	81

Regional finals Sweet Sixteen
4	West Texas A&M	86
2	Angelo State	64

=== West Regional ===
- Site: Anchorage, Alaska (Alaska Anchorage)

Regional Quarterfinals; Round of 64
1	Alaska-Anchorage	63
8	Hawaii Pacific	56
4	UC San Diego	65
5	Simon Fraser	69
2	Cal Baptist	85
7	Point Loma	79
3	Western Washington	74
6	CSU East Bay	48

Regional semifinals Round of 32
1	Alaska-Anchorage	70
5	Simon Fraser	80
2	Cal Baptist	80
3	Western Washington	68

Regional finals Sweet Sixteen
5	Simon Fraser	64
2	Cal Baptist	77

=== Finals ===
Quarterfinals, semifinals and finals were hosted at Alumni Hall in Columbus, Ohio.

Quarterfinals; Elite Eight
MW1	Ashland	82
SC4	West Texas A&M	67
C2	Harding	73
E2	Queens (NY)	69
W2	Cal Baptist	77
S2	West Florida	69
SE1	Columbus State	73
A3	Virginia Union	78

Semifinals; Final Four
MW1	Ashland	90
C2	Harding	77
W2	Cal Baptist	81
A3	Virginia Union	86

Finals; Championship Game
MW1	Ashland	93
A3	Virginia Union	77

== See also ==
- 2017 NCAA Division I women's basketball tournament
- 2017 NCAA Division III women's basketball tournament
- 2017 NAIA Division I women's basketball tournament
- 2017 NAIA Division II women's basketball tournament
- 2017 NCAA Division II men's basketball tournament
