= J. P. Macura =

American basketball player

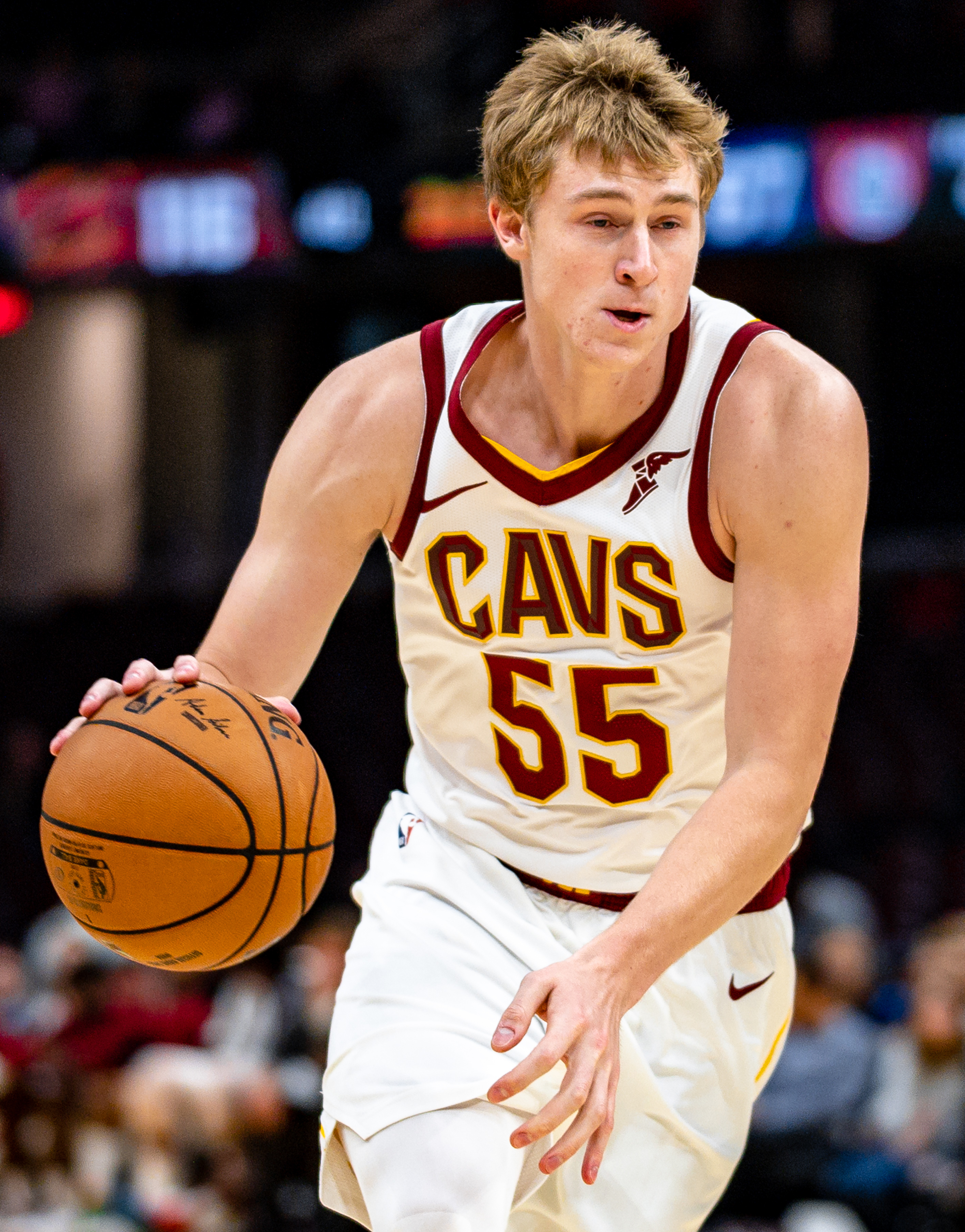
- Macura with the Cleveland Cavaliers in 2019

No. 55 – Universo Treviso Basket
- Position: Small forward / shooting guard
- League: Lega Basket Serie A

Personal information
- Born: June 5, 1995 (age 31) Lakeville, Minnesota, U.S.
- Listed height: 6 ft 5 in (1.96 m)
- Listed weight: 205 lb (93 kg)

Career information
- High school: Lakeville North (Lakeville, Minnesota)
- College: Xavier (2014–2018)
- NBA draft: 2018: undrafted
- Playing career: 2018–present

Career history
- 2018–2019: Charlotte Hornets
- 2018–2019: → Greensboro Swarm
- 2019–2020: Canton Charge
- 2020: Cleveland Cavaliers
- 2020–2021: Afyon Belediye
- 2021–2023: Derthona
- 2024–2025: Treviso
- 2025–2026: Promitheas Patras
- 2026–present: Universo Treviso Basket

Career highlights
- Big East Sixth Man of the Year (2016)
- Stats at NBA.com
- Stats at Basketball Reference

Jonathan Paul Macura (born June 5, 1995) is an American professional basketball player for Universo Treviso Basket of the Italian Lega Basket Serie A (LBA). He played college basketball for Xavier University.

== High school career ==
Macura attended Lakeville North High School in Lakeville, Minnesota. At the school, Macura won one MSHSL state title. He scored 1,811 points in his career, a school record. In his senior season, he averaged 32.2 points and 6.5 rebounds per game. Macura led his team to victory in the 2014 4A state tournament over Hopkins High School, and hit a buzzer-beating three-pointer to win the semifinal game over Cretin-Derham Hall High School. He received scholarship offers from Butler and Iowa State but committed to Xavier to compete in the Big East Conference.

== College career ==
Macura made his first two collegiate starts at Villanova on January 14, 2015, and at Marquette on January 17. He recorded back-to-back double-figure-scoring games for the first time in his Xavier career with an 11-point game at Marquette on February 10 and a 10-point game in a win over Providence on February 7. On March 13 against Georgetown, Macura scored eight points in just seven minutes of action, including going 2-of-2 from three-point territory, before being forced out of the game with an ankle injury. He was forced to sit out the Big East Conference championship game, but returned for the Ole Miss game on March 19 and hit two 3-pointers. In 2014–15, he was seventh on the team in scoring with 5.4 points per game, and third on the team in steals with 26 (0.7 steals per game) in just 13.2 minutes per game.

Macura was voted the 2015–16 Big East Conference Sixth Man of the Year award winner by the Big East coaches in 2016. He provided high energy with 9.4 points, 2.6 rebounds and 1.1 steals per game on the season. In the last 15 games of the season, he averaged 10.6 points per game on 48.6 percent shooting, including 41.2 percent from 3-point territory. Macura scored in double figures in nine of the last 15 games and 16 for the season, including a team-high-tying 19 points to go with three steals in the win over Villanova on February 24, 2016. He hit 80.7 percent from the free-throw line, although he did not have enough attempts to be ranked in the Big East Conference (he would have been 10th). Macura had a season-high 20-point effort in 31 minutes of action versus Marquette on February 6 that included two clutch 3-pointers in the final four minutes.

In March 2016, Macura pulled down his pants and was caught with a fake ID in a Cincinnati bar. He was charged with disorderly conduct. On November 18, Macura scored a career-high 28 points in an 83–77 win over Clemson. He averaged 14.4 points per game as a junior.

As a senior, Macura received the nickname "Dennis the Menace" due to taunting opposing players. Whenever he received a crude tweet, he replied "Thank you, God Bless." He had 27 points against Seton Hall on January 20. Macura averaged 12.9 points per game on a 29–6 team that earned Xavier's first no. 1 seed in the NCAA tournament. He finished his career with 1,491 points.

== Professional career ==
=== Charlotte Hornets/Greensboro Swarm (2018–2019) ===
After going undrafted in the 2018 NBA draft, Macura signed a two-way contract with the Charlotte Hornets, splitting time between the Hornets and their G League affiliate the Greensboro Swarm. In his first game with the Swarm, he scored 27 points in a 114–98 win against the Wisconsin Herd. Macura made his NBA debut on January 2, 2019, in a 122–84 blowout loss to the Dallas Mavericks, recording 4 points, 2 rebounds, and 2 assists in 13 minutes of action.

=== Canton Charge (2019–2020) ===
Macura signed with the Cleveland Cavaliers in July 2019. He was released along with Sindarius Thornwell, Timothé Luwawu-Cabarrot and Daniel Hamilton on October 15, 2019. He later signed with the Cavaliers G League affiliate Canton Charge.

=== Cleveland Cavaliers (2020) ===
On February 9, 2020, the Cleveland Cavaliers announced that they had signed Macura to a 10-day contract. Macura appeared in one game for the Cavaliers before his contract expired.

=== Afyon Belediye (2020–2021) ===
On September 8, 2020, he has signed with Afyon Belediye of the Turkish Basketbol Süper Ligi. He averaged 12.9 points, 3.9 rebounds, 1.7 assists and 1.7 steals per game.

=== Derthona Basket (2021–2023) ===
On July 24, 2021, Macura signed with Derthona Basket of the Lega Basket Serie A.

=== Universo Treviso Basket (2024–2025) ===
On August 5, 2024, he signed with Treviso Basket of the Lega Basket Serie A (LBA).

=== Promitheas Patras (2025–2026) ===
On August 7, 2025, Macura signed with Greek club Promitheas.

=== Second stint with Universo Treviso Basket (2026–present) ===
On January 12, 2026, he signed with Universo Treviso Basket of the Italian Lega Basket Serie A (LBA) for a second stint.

== Career statistics ==
Legend
GP	Games played	GS	Games started	MPG	Minutes per game
FG%	Field goal percentage	3P%	3-point field goal percentage	FT%	Free throw percentage
RPG	Rebounds per game	APG	Assists per game	SPG	Steals per game
BPG	Blocks per game	PPG	Points per game	**Bold**	Career high

=== NBA ===
==== Regular season ====
Year	Team	GP	GS	MPG	FG%	3P%	FT%	RPG	APG	SPG	BPG	PPG
2018–19	Charlotte	**2**	0	**8.5**	**.333**	.000	-	**1.5**	**1.0**	.0	.0	**3.0**
2019–20	Cleveland	1	0	1.0	-	-	-	.0	.0	.0	.0	.0
Career		3	0	6.0	.333	.000	-	1.0	.7	.0	.0	2.0

=== College ===
Year	Team	GP	GS	MPG	FG%	3P%	FT%	RPG	APG	SPG	BPG	PPG
2014–15	Xavier	35	3	13.2	.413	.337	.762	1.2	.6	.7	.1	5.4
2015–16	Xavier	34	4	22.7	.470	.356	.807	2.6	2.0	1.1	.0	9.4
2016–17	Xavier	**38**	**37**	**33.5**	.426	.340	.785	4.4	**2.9**	**1.4**	.2	**14.4**
2017–18	Xavier	34	34	29.7	**.479**	**.377**	**.821**	**4.5**	**2.9**	**1.4**	**.4**	12.9
Career		141	78	25.0	.448	.352	.798	3.2	2.1	1.2	.2	10.6
