= Jandro Zubillaga =

Spanish basketball coach

Personal information
- Born: 11 November 1976 (age 50) Barcelona, Spain
- Position: Head coach
- Coaching career: 2016–present

Career history

Coaching
- 2016–2018: Reserves teams of Baloncesto Fuenlabrada
- 2018–2019: CB Tormes
- 2019–2023: Alba Fehérvár (Assistant)
- 2024–2025: Alba Fehérvár
- 2026: Ángeles de la Ciudad de México

Alejandro "Jandro" Zubillaga Jiménez (born 11 November 1976) is a Spanish basketball coach. He is the head coach of the Ángeles de la Ciudad de México.

== Coaching career ==
Zubillaga started his coaching career in 2016 with the reserve teams of Baloncesto Fuenlabrada. In the 2018 season, he joined CB Tormes. In 2019 he signed with Alba Fehérvár. On 2026, Zubillaga signed with the Ángeles de la Ciudad de México of CIBACOPA.
