= 1997 in basketball =

The following are the basketball events of the year 1997 throughout the world.

== Championships ==
=== Professional ===
- Men
  - 1997 NBA Finals: Chicago Bulls over the Utah Jazz 4-2. MVP: Michael Jordan
    - 1997 NBA Playoffs
    - 1996–97 NBA season
    - 1997 NBA draft
    - 1997 NBA All-Star Game
  - Eurobasket: Yugoslavia 61, Italy 49
- Women
  - WNBA Finals: Houston Comets over the New York Liberty. MVP: Cynthia Cooper
    - 1997 WNBA Playoffs
    - 1997 WNBA season
    - 1997 WNBA draft
  - Eurobasket Women: Lithuania def. Slovakia

=== College ===
- Men
  - NCAA
    - Division I: University of Arizona 84, University of Kentucky 79
    - National Invitation Tournament: University of Michigan def. Florida State University
    - Division II: Cal State Bakersfield 57, Northern Kentucky University 56
    - Division III: Illinois Wesleyan University 89, Nebraska Wesleyan University 86
  - NAIA
    - NAIA Division I: Life University (Ga.) 73, Oklahoma Baptist University 64
    - NAIA Division II: Bethel College (Indiana) (IN) 95, Siena Heights College (MI) 94
  - NJCAA
    - NJCAA Division I: Indian Hills CC, Ottumwa, Iowa 89, San Jacinto College, (TX) 80
- Women
  - NCAA
    - Division I: University of Tennessee 68, Old Dominion University 59
    - Division II: North Dakota State University 94, University of Southern Indiana 78
    - Division III New York University 72, University of Wisconsin–Eau Claire 70
  - NAIA
    - NAIA Division I: Southern Nazarene University (OK) 78 Union College (TN) (73)
    - NAIA Division II Northwest Nazarene University (ID) 64, Black Hills State University (SD) 46
  - NJCAA
    - Division I Trinity Valley CC 79, Central Florida CC 69
    - Division II Kirkwood CC 76, Carl Sandburg College 67
    - Division III Anoka-Ramsey CC 80, Monroe CC 57

=== Preps ===
Bloomington North defeats Delta to win Indiana's last open-class basketball state championship.

== Awards and honors ==
=== Professional ===
- Men
  - NBA Most Valuable Player Award: Karl Malone
  - NBA Rookie of the Year Award: Allen Iverson
  - NBA Defensive Player of the Year Award: Dikembe Mutombo
  - NBA Coach of the Year Award: Pat Riley, Miami Heat
- Women
  - WNBA Most Valuable Player Award: Cynthia Cooper, Houston Comets
  - WNBA Defensive Player of the Year Award: Teresa Weatherspoon, New York Liberty
  - Kim Perrot Sportsmanship Award: Zheng Haixia, Los Angeles Sparks
  - WNBA Coach of the Year Award: Van Chancellor, Houston Comets
  - WNBA Finals Most Valuable Player Award: Cynthia Cooper, Houston Comets

=== Collegiate ===
- Men
  - John R. Wooden Award: Tim Duncan, Wake Forest
  - Naismith College Coach of the Year: Roy Williams, Kansas
  - Frances Pomeroy Naismith Award: Brevin Knight, Stanford
  - Associated Press College Basketball Player of the Year: Tim Duncan, Wake Forest
  - NCAA basketball tournament Most Outstanding Player: Jeff Sheppard, Kentucky
  - Associated Press College Basketball Coach of the Year: Clem Haskins, Minnesota
  - Naismith Outstanding Contribution to Basketball: Phog Allen
- Women
  - Naismith College Player of the Year: Kate Starbird, Stanford
  - Naismith College Coach of the Year: Geno Auriemma, Connecticut
  - Wade Trophy: DeLisha Milton, Florida
  - Frances Pomeroy Naismith Award: Jennifer Howard, NC State
  - Associated Press Women's College Basketball Player of the Year: Kara Wolters, Connecticut
  - NCAA basketball tournament Most Outstanding Player: Chamique Holdsclaw, Tennessee
  - Carol Eckman Award: Amy Ruley, North Dakota State University
  - Associated Press College Basketball Coach of the Year: Geno Auriemma, Connecticut

=== Naismith Memorial Basketball Hall of Fame ===
- Class of 1997:
  - Pete Carril
  - Joan Crawford
  - Denise Curry
  - Antonio Díaz-Miguel
  - Alex English
  - Don Haskins
  - Bailey Howell

== Events ==
- WNBA played its first season.

== Movies ==
- Air Bud
- The Sixth Man

== Deaths ==
- January 8 — Paul Endacott, Hall of Fame player for the Kansas Jayhawks (born 1902)
- February 2 — Raimundo Saporta, former head of Real Madrid basketball and FIBA Hall of Fame member (born 1926)
- March 6 — Roger Brown, player for Indiana Pacers (born 1942)
- April 18 — Francis Johnson, American Olympic gold medalist (1936) (born 1910)
- May 16 — Bones McKinney, former coach of the Wake Forest Demon Deacons and early NBA player (born 1919)
- May 17 — Tusten Ackerman, All-American college player at Kansas (born 1901)
- June 5 — Joe Schaaf, All-American college player (Penn) (born 1908)
- September 7 — Bill Strannigan, American college coach (Colorado State, Iowa State, Wyoming) (born 1918)
- December 23 — Lester Harrison, Hall of Fame coach of the 1951 NBA Champion Rochester Royals (born 1904)

== See also ==
- Timeline of women's basketball
