= 1997 NCAA Division III women's basketball tournament =

- Teams: 64
- Finals site: Coles Sports Center, (New York (state)) New York, New York
- Champions: NYU Violets (1st title)
- Runner-up: Wisconsin–Eau Claire Blugolds (1st title game)
- Third place: Capital Crusaders (5th Final Four)
- Fourth place: Scranton Royals (4th Final Four)
- Winning coach: Janice Quinn (1st title)
- MOP: Marsha Harris (NYU)
- Attendance: 50,604

The 1997 NCAA Division III women's basketball tournament was the 16th annual tournament hosted by the NCAA to determine the national champion of Division III women's collegiate basketball in the United States.

NYU Violets defeated Wisconsin–Eau Claire Blugolds in the championship game, 72–70, to claim the Violets' first Division III national title. Marsha Harris went coast-to-coast and made a game winning layup with 1.5 seconds remaining in the game to seal the victory.

The championship rounds were hosted by New York University at the Coles Sports Center in New York City from March 21–22, 1994.

== Bracket ==
- An asterisk by a team indicates the host of first and second round games
- An asterisk by a score indicates an overtime period

=== East sectional ===
Play-in round March 5, 1997; Campus sites
NYU*	66
Nazareth	50
East Region
St. John Fisher	75
Hartwick*	62**
Rowan*	77
Frostburg State	47
Atlantic Region
Gallaudet	69
William Paterson*	81
Binghamton*	73
Ithaca	66
East Region
Geneseo State	62
William Smith*	84
Colby–Sawyer*	71
TCNJ	80
Atlantic Region
Staten Island	58
Marymount (VA)*	79

Second round March 8, 1997; Campus sites
NYU*	75
St. John Fisher	46
Rowan*	58
William Paterson	60
Ithaca	57
William Smith*	81
TCNJ	52
Marymount (VA)	64*

Sectional semifinals March 14, 1997; New York, NY
NYU	84
St. John Fisher	74
William Smith	80
Marymount (VA)	75

Sectional finals March 15, 1997; New York, NY
NYU	75
William Smith	53

=== Mid-Atlantic sectional ===
Play-in round March 5, 1997; Campus sites
Clark (MA)*	81
Emmanuel (MA)	88
Northeast Region
Western Connecticut*	86
Bates	65
Elizabethtown*	69
Allentown	61
Mid-Atlantic Region
Cabrini	45
Johns Hopkins*	66
Salem State*	66
Williams	80
Northeast Region
Trinity (CT)	51
Southern Maine*	53
Alvernia*	63
Lycoming	45
Mid-Atlantic Region
Muhlenberg	54
Scranton*	83

Second round March 8, 1997; Campus sites
Emmanuel	52
Western Connecticut*	76
Elizabethtown*	57
Johns Hopkins	64
Williams	61
Southern Maine*	68
Alvernia	63
Scranton	66*

Sectional semifinals March 14, 1997; Scranton, PA
Western Connecticut	66
Johns Hopkins	76
Southern Maine	61
Scranton	70

Sectional finals March 15, 1997; Scranton, PA
Johns Hopkins	54
Scranton	65

=== Great Lakes sectional ===
Play-in round March 5, 1997; Campus sites
Defiance*	92
Hanover	51
Great Lakes Region
Kenyon	59
Alma*	66
Buena Vista*	88*
Bethel (MN)	77
West Region
Pomona-Pitzer	50
UC San Diego*	74
Baldwin Wallace*	55
Calvin	58
Great Lakes Region
Bethany (WV)	46
Capital*	80
St. Benedict*	97
Chapman	59
West Region
Luther	47
St. Thomas (MN)*	89

Second round March 8, 1997; Campus sites
Defiance*	85
Alma	72
Buena Vista*	80
UC San Diego	77
Calvin	44
Capital*	66
St. Benedict	67
St. Thomas (MN)*	95

Sectional semifinals March 14, 1997; Defiance, OH
Defiance	90
Buena Vista	80
Capital	70
St. Thomas (MN)	64

Sectional finals March 15, 1997; Defiance, OH
Defiance	62
Capital	79

=== Central sectional ===
Play-in round March 5, 1997; Campus sites
Millikin*	61
Washington St. Louis	53
Central Region
Wheaton (IL)	60
Wisconsin–Stout*	65
Emory*	70
Greensboro	51
South Region
SCAD	54
Hendrix*	76
Wisconsin–Oshkosh*	89
Blackburn	52
Central Region
Beloit	57
Wisconsin–Eau Claire*	78
Bridgewater (VA)*	82
Christopher Newport	72
South Region
Thomas More	80
Roanoke*	76

Second round March 8, 1997; Campus sites
Millikin*	81
Wisconsin–Stout	77
Emory*	40
Hendrix	36
Wisconsin–Oshkosh	56
Wisconsin–Eau Claire*	63
Bridgewater (VA)*	81
Thomas More	83

Sectional semifinals March 14, 1997; Decatur, IL
Millikin	51
Emory	43
Wisconsin–Eau Claire	90
Thomas More	55

Sectional finals March 15, 1997; Decatur, IL
Millikin	63
Wisconsin–Eau Claire	67

=== Final Four ===
Final Four; March 21, 1997; New York, NY
NYU	84
Scranton	72
Capital	63
Wisconsin–Eau Claire	77

National championship March 22, 1997; New York, NY
NYU	72
Wisconsin–Eau Claire	70
Third place
Scranton	48
Capital	70

== All-tournament team ==
- Marsha Harris, NYU
- Jennifer Krowlikowski, NYU
- Allison Berg, Wisconsin–Eau Claire
- Erika Schmidt, Wisconsin–Eau Claire
- Kristin Long, Capital

== See also ==
- 1997 NCAA Division III men's basketball tournament
- 1997 NCAA Division I women's basketball tournament
- 1997 NCAA Division II women's basketball tournament
- 1997 NAIA Division I women's basketball tournament
- 1997 NAIA Division II women's basketball tournament
