= 1912–13 Yale Bulldogs men's ice hockey season =

College ice hockey season

- Conference: 3rd IHL
- Home ice: Yale Rink

Record
- Overall: 2–7–0
- Conference: 0–4–0
- Home: 1–0–0
- Road: 1–1–0
- Neutral: 0–6–0

Coaches and captains
- Captain: Archer Harmon

The 1912–13 Yale Bulldogs men's ice hockey season was the 18th season of play for the program.

== Season ==
Prior to the season, Yale, a founding member of the Intercollegiate Hockey Association, withdrew from the league. The Bulldogs' exit was precipitated by the building of the Yale Rink on campus, which meant the team no longer had to travel to find stable ice. League rules required all inter-squad matches to be played at the St. Nicholas Rink or the Boston Arena. Another matter was the disparity in play between the teams. Yale, Princeton and Harvard were widely considered as the cream of college hockey, with each competing for the championship year after year, while the remaining teams would rarely demonstrate an equivalent level of play. Rather than be forced into matches that would not enhance Yale's record, the Elis wanted to play the Canadian universities more often and buoy its reputation.

After an agreement between Yale, Princeton and Harvard to play best-of-three series against one another, the Intercollegiate Hockey League was tentatively formed. Yale, however, could hardly have picked a worse season to declare itself among the college hockey elite as it failed to defeat St. Paul's School, a prep school in its opening game. Yale dispensed with its usual winter break trip and instead played a single game against McGill. While the team performed far better than they had in their first contest they did fall to the Canadian club.

After returning from the break, Yale scheduled 10 games for the remainder of their season, with a majority taking place at the Yale Rink. In their first game the Elis appeared to have righted the ship by downing Columbia 6–0, though the game had to be played on the road instead of New Haven. the Yale Rink did not provide the stable ice the team hoped it would; the match against MIT was called off due to no ice at the rink which also caused the first game against Princeton, originally scheduled for the 13th, to be pushed to later in the year. A third home game against Toronto was also cancelled.

Yale had to travel to the St. Nicholas Rink for their next game and despite missing out on three games, the Elis gave Princeton a tough fight. After opening the scoring, Yale found itself down by two goals early in the second half. A furious effort by Yale saw the team score four times in the span of four minutes and take a 5–4 lead late in the match. Unfortunately, 17 seconds before regulation ended, Princeton tied the game and then scored twice in overtime to take the first game of the series. A fifth home contest, this time versus Cornell, was cancelled and left the Elis without a home game for the entire month of January.

The team returned to the ice in February when they travelled to Boston for the first game against Harvard. Yale could not, however, field its normal lineup as several players were missing due to illness or injury. The result was that the Elis could hardly make a dent in the stout Harvard defense and fell 0–4 to the Crimson. The shot total of 34 to 6 in favor of Harvard demonstrates how lopsided the match was.

Two further home games were cancelled with the second being moved to the St. Nicholas Rink, where Yale fell to Dartmouth 2–3. The next day the Elis were finally able to play at home, defeating the Freshman team in an exhibition match. The second match against Princeton began well for the Bulldogs with Yale leading 1–0 at the half. The second half, however, was a nightmare for the Elis. Princeton scored 8 goals, four coming from Hobey Baker, as the defense was swamped and Yale was soundly beaten 8–2.

Yale was able to tack on a game against Massachusetts Agricultural College to give themselves one official home game before the rematch against Harvard. Yale scored first and led at the half but, similar to the Princeton game, Harvard scored three goals and dominated the period. The Elis closed the gap with less than a minute to play but they could not stop Harvard from claiming the Intercollegiate title.

The team did not have a coach, however, Alfred Cowles served as team manager.

== Roster ==
No.	Nat.	Player	Class	Pos	Height	Weight	DoB	Hometown	Previous team
		Francis H. Bangs	Sophomore	C		151 lb (68 kg)			St. Paul's School
		John B. Bellinger	Sophomore	D
	(United States)	Alexander W. Chauncey	Senior	RW			1891-04-06	Brooklyn Heights, New York
		Walton Cox	Senior	R/C/D			1890-12-20
		Merritt W. Gano Jr.	Junior	D		175 lb (79 kg)	1890-05-04		St. Paul's School
		George A. Gore	Senior	D		163 lb (74 kg)
		Archer Harman (C)	Senior	C/R			1889-10-11
		Walter S. Heron Jr.	Junior	LW		167 lb (76 kg)			St. Paul's School
	(United States)	Ranald H. MacDonald Jr.	Sophomore	D		148 lb (67 kg)	1891-11-24	Brooklyn, New York	St. Paul's School
		Clyde Martin	Senior	D
		Hugh H. McLean Jr.	Junior	C
		Lucius P. Ordway Jr.	Junior	C		132 lb (60 kg)	1890-12-02		Hotchkiss School
		Morgan B. Schiller	Junior	G		148 lb (67 kg)	1893-07-23		St. Paul's School
		Theodore P. Swift	Sophomore	G			1891-07-12
		John M. Tilney	Senior	G

== Standings ==
1912–13 Collegiate ice hockey standings
	Intercollegiate							Overall					
	GP	W	L	T	PCT.	GF	GA	GP	W	L	T	GF	GA
Amherst	–	–	–	–	–	–	–	4	1	2	1	–	–
Army	5	4	1	0	.800	15	7	6	5	1	0	42	7
Columbia	1	0	1	0	.000	0	6	2	0	2	0	6	13
Cornell	6	0	6	0	.000	8	41	7	0	7	0	8	51
Dartmouth	10	8	2	0	.800	43	15	10	8	2	0	43	15
Harvard	10	9	1	0	.900	42	14	11	9	2	0	42	16
Massachusetts Agricultural	6	3	3	0	.500	24	19	6	3	3	0	24	19
MIT	5	2	3	0	.400	17	13	9	4	5	0	28	32
Norwich	–	–	–	–	–	–	–	–	–	–	–	–	–
Notre Dame	0	0	0	0	–	0	0	3	1	2	0	7	12
NYU	–	–	–	–	–	–	–	–	–	–	–	–	–
Princeton	11	9	2	0	.818	64	23	14	12	2	0	78	32
Rensselaer	4	0	4	0	.000	2	17	4	0	4	0	2	17
Syracuse	–	–	–	–	–	–	–	–	–	–	–	–	–
Trinity	–	–	–	–	–	–	–	–	–	–	–	–	–
Williams	6	2	3	1	.417	19	24	6	2	3	1	19	24
Yale	7	2	5	0	.286	21	25	9	2	7	0	23	31
YMCA College	–	–	–	–	–	–	–	–	–	–	–	–	–

1912–13 Intercollegiate Hockey League standings
	Conference								Overall					
	GP	W	L	T	PTS	SW	GF	GA	GP	W	L	T	GF	GA
Harvard *	5	4	1	0	.800	2	16	8	11	9	2	0	42	16
Princeton	5	3	2	0	.600	1	21	13	14	12	2	0	78	32
Yale	4	0	4	0	.000	0	9	22	9	2	7	0	23	31
* indicates conference champion

== Schedule and results ==
Date	Opponent	Site	Result	Record
Regular season
December 19	vs. St. Paul's School*	St. Nicholas Rink • New York, New York	L 2–4	0–1–0
January 1	vs. McGill*	Boston Arena • Boston, Massachusetts	L 0–2	0–2–0
January 8	at Columbia*	St. Nicholas Rink • New York, New York	W 6–0	1–2–0
January 18	vs. Princeton	St. Nicholas Rink • New York, New York	L 5–7	1–3–0 (0–1–0)
February 1	at Harvard	Boston Arena • Boston, Massachusetts (Rivalry)	L 0–4	1–4–0 (0–2–0)
February 7	Dartmouth*	St. Nicholas Rink • New York, New York	L 2–3	1–5–0
February 8	vs. Yale Freshman Team*	Yale Rink • New Haven, Connecticut (Exhibition)	W 7–1	
February 12	vs. Princeton	St. Nicholas Rink • New York, New York	L 2–8	1–6–0 (0–3–0)
February 15	Massachusetts Agricultural*	Yale Rink • New Haven, Connecticut	W 4–0	2–6–0
February 19	vs. Harvard	St. Nicholas Rink • New York, New York (Rivalry)	L 2–3	2–7–0 (0–4–0)
*Non-conference game.
