= 1912–13 Army Cadets men's ice hockey season =

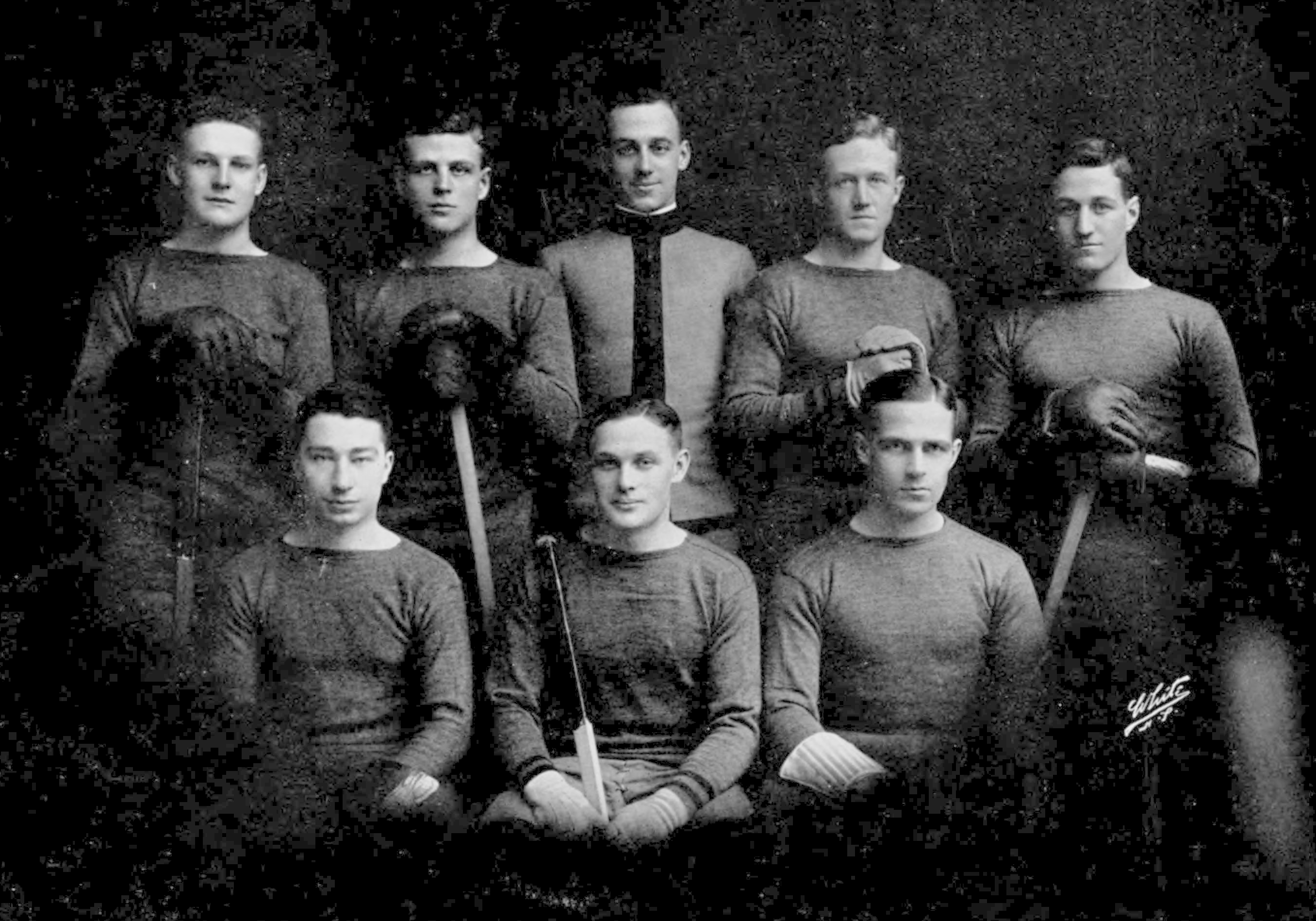
- Conference: Independent
- Home ice: Lusk Reservoir

Record
- Overall: 5–1–0

Coaches and captains
- Head coach: Philip Gordon
- Captain: Joseph Viner

The 1912–13 Army Cadets men's ice hockey season was the 10th season of play for the program.

== Season ==
Lt. Philip Gordon took over head coaching duties and, in his second game, led the team to its largest ever victory with a 27–0 throttling of the New York Military Academy.

== Roster ==
No.	Nat.	Player	Class	Pos	Height	Weight	DoB	Hometown	Previous team
	(United States)	Joseph W. Viner (C)	Junior	LW			1889-02-16	Pennsylvania

== Standings ==
1912–13 Collegiate ice hockey standings
	Intercollegiate							Overall					
	GP	W	L	T	PCT.	GF	GA	GP	W	L	T	GF	GA
Amherst	–	–	–	–	–	–	–	4	1	2	1	–	–
Army	5	4	1	0	.800	15	7	6	5	1	0	42	7
Columbia	1	0	1	0	.000	0	6	2	0	2	0	6	13
Cornell	6	0	6	0	.000	8	41	7	0	7	0	8	51
Dartmouth	10	8	2	0	.800	43	15	10	8	2	0	43	15
Harvard	10	9	1	0	.900	42	14	11	9	2	0	42	16
Massachusetts Agricultural	6	3	3	0	.500	24	19	6	3	3	0	24	19
MIT	5	2	3	0	.400	17	13	9	4	5	0	28	32
Norwich	–	–	–	–	–	–	–	–	–	–	–	–	–
Notre Dame	0	0	0	0	–	0	0	3	1	2	0	7	12
NYU	–	–	–	–	–	–	–	–	–	–	–	–	–
Princeton	11	9	2	0	.818	64	23	14	12	2	0	78	32
Rensselaer	4	0	4	0	.000	2	17	4	0	4	0	2	17
Syracuse	–	–	–	–	–	–	–	–	–	–	–	–	–
Trinity	–	–	–	–	–	–	–	–	–	–	–	–	–
Williams	6	2	3	1	.417	19	24	6	2	3	1	19	24
Yale	7	2	5	0	.286	21	25	9	2	7	0	23	31
YMCA College	–	–	–	–	–	–	–	–	–	–	–	–	–

== Schedule and results ==
Date	Opponent	Site	Result	Record
Regular Season
February 8	MIT*	Lusk Reservoir • West Point, New York	L 0–5	0–1–0
	New York Military Academy*	Lusk Reservoir • West Point, New York	W 27–0	1–1–0
	Amherst*	Lusk Reservoir • West Point, New York	W 1–0	2–1–0
	Trinity*	Lusk Reservoir • West Point, New York	W 3–0	3–1–0
	NYU*	Lusk Reservoir • West Point, New York	W 7–2	4–1–0
	Norwich*	Lusk Reservoir • West Point, New York	W 4–0	5–1–0
*Non-conference game.
