= 1912–13 Princeton Tigers men's ice hockey season =

College ice hockey season

Intercollegiate Hockey Association, Champion
- Conference: 2nd IHL / 1st IHA
- Home ice: Lake Carnegie

Record
- Overall: 9–2–0
- Conference: 2–0–0 (IHA) / 3–2–0 (IHL)
- Road: 0–2–0
- Neutral: 9–0–0

Coaches and captains
- Head coach: Gus Hornfeck
- Captain: Hobey Baker

The 1912–13 Princeton Tigers men's ice hockey season was the 14th season of play for the program.

== Season ==
With both Yale and Columbia dropping from the Intercollegiate Hockey Association the league champion would be so in name only. As a result, Princeton made arrangements with Harvard and Yale to play best-of-three series against one another. Despite the upheaval, Princeton began the season well with a pair practice game wins before throttling Williams to open the season. Team captain Hobey Baker set a program record by recording 8 goals in the game and added three assists.

Princeton then embarked on a road trip to Syracuse for a three-game series with Cornell where the Tigers claimed all three contests. Despite being beset by two defenders for parts of the games, Baker scored 10 goals while assists were not recorded. For the first conference game Princeton jumped out to an early lead thanks to the efforts of Baker and Kuhn but Dartmouth clawed back into the game with a strong effort but ultimately fell short. The next game against Cornell was a lopsided affair with Baker scoring 5 goals and notching at least one assist in the 9–0 win that gave Princeton the IHA championship.

The difficult portion of their schedule began after claiming the conference title when the Tigers faced their toughest opponent to date, Yale. The Bulldogs followed a similar tactic to earlier opponents by pitting two defenders against Baker but with the increased talent possessed by the Elis their efforts were more effective. While Baker was held goal-less the rest of the team was able to build a two-goal lead in the second half but a flurry of three goals in three minutes by Yale left the Tigers reeling. Kilner managed to tie the game late and push the match into overtime. The tough defensive work done by Yale in regulation appeared to be all the Elis could give and just 12 seconds into the extra frame Patterson scored. The Tigers kept the pressure on, allowing Baker to score his only goal of the night just before the end of the 5-minute session and give Princeton the win.

Their next game came against Harvard and the two teams fought a close affair that required overtime. Crimson netminder Gardner stopped some 40 shots in the game and his team rewarded him with a victory, handing Princeton its first loss of the season. After two wins against non-college foes, Princeton faced Harvard in a rematch and would have to win the game to retain any hope of claiming a collegiate championship. The Tigers did just that, downing Harvard 3–1 with Baker repeating his earlier effort with a goal and an assist. The win set up a deciding game between the two but first Princeton would have to face Yale in a rematch.

The Tigers started slowly, being unable to beat Yale netminder Harmon, and allowed the Bulldogs to take a 1–0 lead into halftime. The game picked up speed in the second and the powerful offense for Princeton came to the fore. The Tigers scored 8 goals to Yale's 1 with Baker contributing on at least three goals including scoring the game-winner. Their final game of the year would serve as a de facto championship game against Harvard as the two teams had defeated all other peers throughout the season. Princeton played the Crimson hard and fired 29 shots on goal but all were turned aside and Harvard won the contest 3–0, sending a disappointed Tiger team packing.

Despite the unhappy end, Hobey Baker's minimum of 35 goals on the season is a (unofficial) program record as of 2020. It's unknown how many assists he also scored, as the statistic was not officially recorded, but he was credited with at least 16 for the year. Note: Scoring statistics for the game against St. Paul's were not recorded.

== Roster ==
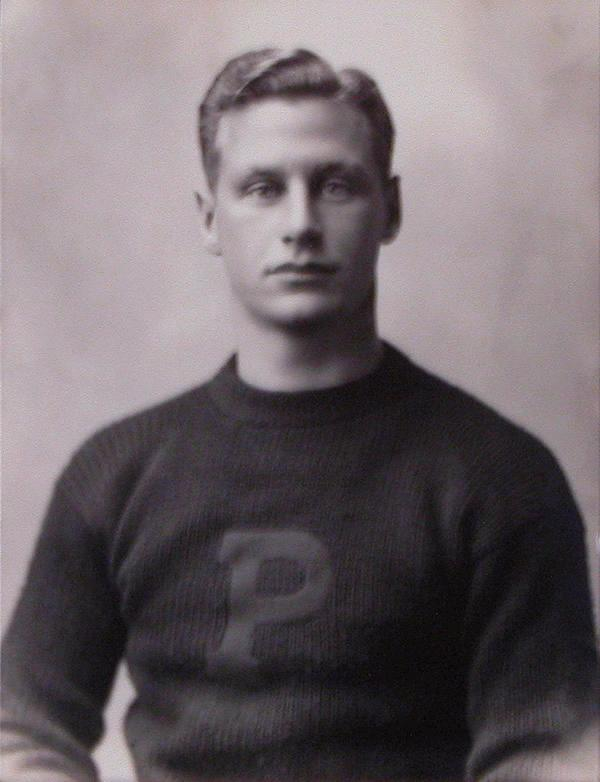
Hobey Baker

No.	Nat.	Player	Class	Pos	Height	Weight	DoB	Hometown	Previous team
	(United States)	Hobey Baker (C)	Junior	R	5' 9" (1.75 m)	161 lb (73 kg)	1892-01-15	Bala Cynwyd, Pennsylvania	St. Paul's School
		Gray Bryan	Senior	D
		Ralph Campbell	Sophomore	D
		Robert Cowan	Sophomore	RW
		Thornton Emmons	Junior	D
		Ehrick Kilner	Junior	RW
		Wendel Kuhn	Junior	C
		Robert C. Lee	Senior	D
		James MacColl	Junior	LW
		Robert Patterson	Senior	LW
		Frank Winants	Junior	G

== Standings ==
1912–13 Collegiate ice hockey standings
	Intercollegiate							Overall					
	GP	W	L	T	PCT.	GF	GA	GP	W	L	T	GF	GA
Amherst	–	–	–	–	–	–	–	4	1	2	1	–	–
Army	5	4	1	0	.800	15	7	6	5	1	0	42	7
Columbia	1	0	1	0	.000	0	6	2	0	2	0	6	13
Cornell	6	0	6	0	.000	8	41	7	0	7	0	8	51
Dartmouth	10	8	2	0	.800	43	15	10	8	2	0	43	15
Harvard	10	9	1	0	.900	42	14	11	9	2	0	42	16
Massachusetts Agricultural	6	3	3	0	.500	24	19	6	3	3	0	24	19
MIT	5	2	3	0	.400	17	13	9	4	5	0	28	32
Norwich	–	–	–	–	–	–	–	–	–	–	–	–	–
Notre Dame	0	0	0	0	–	0	0	3	1	2	0	7	12
NYU	–	–	–	–	–	–	–	–	–	–	–	–	–
Princeton	11	9	2	0	.818	64	23	14	12	2	0	78	32
Rensselaer	4	0	4	0	.000	2	17	4	0	4	0	2	17
Syracuse	–	–	–	–	–	–	–	–	–	–	–	–	–
Trinity	–	–	–	–	–	–	–	–	–	–	–	–	–
Williams	6	2	3	1	.417	19	24	6	2	3	1	19	24
Yale	7	2	5	0	.286	21	25	9	2	7	0	23	31
YMCA College	–	–	–	–	–	–	–	–	–	–	–	–	–

1912–13 Intercollegiate Hockey Association standings
	Conference							Overall					
	GP	W	L	T	PTS	GF	GA	GP	W	L	T	GF	GA
Princeton *	2	2	0	0	4	12	2	14	12	2	0	78	32
Dartmouth	2	1	1	0	2	9	4	10	8	2	0	43	15
Cornell	2	0	2	0	0	1	16	7	0	7	0	8	51
* indicates conference champion

1912–13 Intercollegiate Hockey League standings
	Conference								Overall					
	GP	W	L	T	PTS	SW	GF	GA	GP	W	L	T	GF	GA
Harvard *	5	4	1	0	.800	2	16	8	11	9	2	0	42	16
Princeton	5	3	2	0	.600	1	21	13	14	12	2	0	78	32
Yale	4	0	4	0	.000	0	9	22	9	2	7	0	23	31
* indicates conference champion

== Schedule and results ==
Date	Opponent	Site	Result	Record
Regular Season
December 11	vs. Irish American Athletic Club*	St. Nicholas Rink • New York, New York	W 4–2	1–0–0
	at St. Nicholas Hockey Club*	St. Nicholas Rink • New York, New York (Exhibition)	W 5–2	
December 20	vs. Williams*	St. Nicholas Rink • New York, New York	W 14–1	2–0–0
December 26	vs. Cornell*	Arena Ice Rink • Syracuse, New York	W 5–1	3–0–0
December 27	vs. Cornell*	Arena Ice Rink • Syracuse, New York	W 5–3	4–0–0
December 28	vs. Cornell*	Arena Ice Rink • Syracuse, New York	W 7–1	5–0–0
January 4	vs. Dartmouth	Boston Arena • Boston, Massachusetts	W 3–2	6–0–0 (1–0–0)
January 11	vs. Cornell	St. Nicholas Rink • New York, New York	W 9–0	7–0–0 (2–0–0)
January 18	vs. Yale*	St. Nicholas Rink • New York, New York	W 7–5 ^{OT}	8–0–0
January 22	at Harvard*	Boston Arena • Boston, Massachusetts	L 3–5 ^{OT}	8–1–0
February 4	at Boston Athletic Association*	Boston Arena • Boston, Massachusetts	W 6–3	9–1–0
February 5	vs. St. Paul's School*	Boston Arena • Boston, Massachusetts	W 4–3	10–1–0
February 8	vs. Harvard*	St. Nicholas Rink • New York, New York	W 3–1	11–1–0
February 12	vs. Yale*	St. Nicholas Rink • New York, New York	W 8–2	12–1–0
February 15	at Harvard*	Boston Arena • Boston, Massachusetts	L 0–3	12–2–0
*Non-conference game.
