= 1912–13 Massachusetts Agricultural Aggies men's ice hockey season =

- Home ice: Campus Pond

Record
- Overall: 3–3–0

Coaches and captains
- Captain: John Hutchinson

The 1912–13 Massachusetts Agricultural Aggies men's ice hockey season was the 5th season of play for the program.

== Season ==
Building upon the recent success of the young program, the Aggies scheduled three games against the upper echelon teams. Mass Ag lost all three games but in their other three matches the Aggies proved they were still among the best of the rest.

== Roster ==
No.	Nat.	Player	Class	Pos	Height	Weight	DoB	Hometown	Previous team
		Herbert H. Archibald	Sophomore
		C. Herbert Brewer	Senior
		Ray L. Chisholm	Freshman
		Charles H. Fernald II	Freshman
		John G. Hutchinson (C)	Junior
		Arthur Johnson	Sophomore
		Dittmar W. Jones	Junior
		Willard S. Little	Senior
		Lester W. Needham	Junior

== Standings ==
1912–13 Collegiate ice hockey standings
	Intercollegiate							Overall					
	GP	W	L	T	PCT.	GF	GA	GP	W	L	T	GF	GA
Amherst	–	–	–	–	–	–	–	4	1	2	1	–	–
Army	5	4	1	0	.800	15	7	6	5	1	0	42	7
Columbia	1	0	1	0	.000	0	6	2	0	2	0	6	13
Cornell	6	0	6	0	.000	8	41	7	0	7	0	8	51
Dartmouth	10	8	2	0	.800	43	15	10	8	2	0	43	15
Harvard	10	9	1	0	.900	42	14	11	9	2	0	42	16
Massachusetts Agricultural	6	3	3	0	.500	24	19	6	3	3	0	24	19
MIT	5	2	3	0	.400	17	13	9	4	5	0	28	32
Norwich	–	–	–	–	–	–	–	–	–	–	–	–	–
Notre Dame	0	0	0	0	–	0	0	3	1	2	0	7	12
NYU	–	–	–	–	–	–	–	–	–	–	–	–	–
Princeton	11	9	2	0	.818	64	23	14	12	2	0	78	32
Rensselaer	4	0	4	0	.000	2	17	4	0	4	0	2	17
Syracuse	–	–	–	–	–	–	–	–	–	–	–	–	–
Trinity	–	–	–	–	–	–	–	–	–	–	–	–	–
Williams	6	2	3	1	.417	19	24	6	2	3	1	19	24
Yale	7	2	5	0	.286	21	25	9	2	7	0	23	31
YMCA College	–	–	–	–	–	–	–	–	–	–	–	–	–

== Schedule and results ==
Date	Opponent	Site	Result	Record
Regular Season
January 15	YMCA College*	Campus Pond • Amherst, Massachusetts	W 6–0	1–0–0
January 27	at Harvard*	Boston Arena • Boston, Massachusetts	L 3–9	1–1–0
February 8	at YMCA College*	Lake Massasoit • Springfield, Massachusetts	W 10–1	2–1–0
February 9	at Amherst*	Amherst, Massachusetts	W 2–0	3–1–0
February 12	at Dartmouth*	Hanover, New Hampshire	L 3–5	3–2–0
February 15	at Yale*	Yale Rink • New Haven, Connecticut	L 0–4	3–3–0
*Non-conference game.
