= 1912–13 Notre Dame men's ice hockey season =

- Conference: Independent

Record
- Overall: 1–2–0
- Road: 1–2–0

Coaches and captains
- Head coach: G. R. Walsh
- Captain: H. Krug

The 1912–13 Notre Dame men's ice hockey season was the second season of play for the program.

== Season ==
For their second season, Notre Dame increased its schedule from one to three games. The lack of other college ice hockey programs near Notre Dame's campus in South Bend left the administration with little recourse but to suspend operations as there was little reason to keep the program running. The geographically closest college was Cornell, nearly 600 miles away in upstate New York. The program would eventually return after World War I.

Note: Notre Dame was not officially known as the 'Fighting Irish' until 1919.

== Roster ==
No.	Nat.	Player	Class	Pos	Height	Weight	DoB	Hometown	Previous team
		H. Krug (C)

== Standings ==
1912–13 Collegiate ice hockey standings
	Intercollegiate							Overall					
	GP	W	L	T	PCT.	GF	GA	GP	W	L	T	GF	GA
Amherst	–	–	–	–	–	–	–	4	1	2	1	–	–
Army	5	4	1	0	.800	15	7	6	5	1	0	42	7
Columbia	1	0	1	0	.000	0	6	2	0	2	0	6	13
Cornell	6	0	6	0	.000	8	41	7	0	7	0	8	51
Dartmouth	10	8	2	0	.800	43	15	10	8	2	0	43	15
Harvard	10	9	1	0	.900	42	14	11	9	2	0	42	16
Massachusetts Agricultural	6	3	3	0	.500	24	19	6	3	3	0	24	19
MIT	5	2	3	0	.400	17	13	9	4	5	0	28	32
Norwich	–	–	–	–	–	–	–	–	–	–	–	–	–
Notre Dame	0	0	0	0	–	0	0	3	1	2	0	7	12
NYU	–	–	–	–	–	–	–	–	–	–	–	–	–
Princeton	11	9	2	0	.818	64	23	14	12	2	0	78	32
Rensselaer	4	0	4	0	.000	2	17	4	0	4	0	2	17
Syracuse	–	–	–	–	–	–	–	–	–	–	–	–	–
Trinity	–	–	–	–	–	–	–	–	–	–	–	–	–
Williams	6	2	3	1	.417	19	24	6	2	3	1	19	24
Yale	7	2	5	0	.286	21	25	9	2	7	0	23	31
YMCA College	–	–	–	–	–	–	–	–	–	–	–	–	–

== Schedule and results ==
Date	Opponent	Site	Result	Record
Regular Season
February 15	at Culver Military Academy	Lake Maxinkuckee • Culver, Indiana	W 6–0	1–0–0 (1–0–0)
March 4	at Cleveland Athletic Club	Elysium Arena • Cleveland, Ohio	L 1–7	1–1–0 (1–1–0)
March 6	at Cleveland Athletic Club	Elysium Arena • Cleveland, Ohio	L 0–5	1–2–0 (1–2–0)
*Non-conference game.
