= 1912–13 Columbia Lions men's ice hockey season =

- Conference: Independent

Record
- Overall: 0–2–0

Coaches and captains
- Head coach: Tom Howard
- Captain: Francis Bangs

The 1912–13 Columbia Lions men's ice hockey season was the 17th season of play for the program.

== Season ==
After a very good finish the year before, Columbia was looking forward to competing for the IHA championship. Shortly after the final cuts were announced and the lineup for the team was announce the team encountered a sizeable problem. The IHA had held a meeting regarding player eligibility (no freshman and only three years of eligibility in league games) to which Columbia could not immediately agree. The Columbia representative referred the matter to his faculty committee and the team would continue to play its IHA schedule in the interim. The operators of the St. Nicholas Rink, however, decided that since the matter had not been settled Columbia's place in the IHA was not stable enough to allow the team to practice at the rink. While Columbia choose to play games against the IHA opponents regardless of their place in the league, the Columbia athletic committee decided to uphold its own eligibility requirements (four years of eligibility) regardless of what the IHA rules were. After a resolution could not be reached, Columbia left the IHA in mid-December. Fortunately, despite resigning from the IHA, the St. Nicholas rink did become available for the team afterwards. J. S. Bates, due to being ineligible for intercollegiate games, turned over captaincy of the team to F. N. Bangs.

After the upheaval in December, Columbia began its season on a low note, losing 0–6 to Yale with many of the previous season's players not appearing. After a game against Saegkill Golf Club was postponed due to no ice, Columbia attempted to produce a schedule on the fly. Unfortunately, all members of the IHA refused to schedule any games against the Lions, leaving Columbia with few opportunities. The match against Saegkill was played in early February with the Lions narrowly falling 6–7 in double overtime. Unable to schedule any further games, Columbia's season ended shortly thereafter.

== Roster ==
No.	Nat.	Player	Class	Pos	Height	Weight	DoB	Hometown	Previous team
		Francis N. Bangs (C)	Senior	D
		John S. Bates	Senior	R
		Charles Bartow	Freshman	C
		George P. Butler Jr.	Sophomore	C
		W. S. Johnson	Sophomore	G
		Robert W. Milbank Jr.	Junior	G
		Andrew R. Shiland	Senior	RW
		Neil C. Stevens	Sophomore	LW
		Warwick Todd	Sophomore	C/LW
		Rufus Trimble	Senior	D
		Torrey Webb	Freshman	R/C

== Standings ==
1912–13 Collegiate ice hockey standings
	Intercollegiate							Overall					
	GP	W	L	T	PCT.	GF	GA	GP	W	L	T	GF	GA
Amherst	–	–	–	–	–	–	–	4	1	2	1	–	–
Army	5	4	1	0	.800	15	7	6	5	1	0	42	7
Columbia	1	0	1	0	.000	0	6	2	0	2	0	6	13
Cornell	6	0	6	0	.000	8	41	7	0	7	0	8	51
Dartmouth	10	8	2	0	.800	43	15	10	8	2	0	43	15
Harvard	10	9	1	0	.900	42	14	11	9	2	0	42	16
Massachusetts Agricultural	6	3	3	0	.500	24	19	6	3	3	0	24	19
MIT	5	2	3	0	.400	17	13	9	4	5	0	28	32
Norwich	–	–	–	–	–	–	–	–	–	–	–	–	–
Notre Dame	0	0	0	0	–	0	0	3	1	2	0	7	12
NYU	–	–	–	–	–	–	–	–	–	–	–	–	–
Princeton	11	9	2	0	.818	64	23	14	12	2	0	78	32
Rensselaer	4	0	4	0	.000	2	17	4	0	4	0	2	17
Syracuse	–	–	–	–	–	–	–	–	–	–	–	–	–
Trinity	–	–	–	–	–	–	–	–	–	–	–	–	–
Williams	6	2	3	1	.417	19	24	6	2	3	1	19	24
Yale	7	2	5	0	.286	21	25	9	2	7	0	23	31
YMCA College	–	–	–	–	–	–	–	–	–	–	–	–	–

== Schedule and results ==
Date	Opponent	Site	Result	Record
Regular Season
January 8	vs. Yale	St. Nicholas Rink • New York, New York	L 0–6	0–1–0
February 8	at Saegkill Golf Club	Audubon Rink • Yonkers, New York	L 6–7 ^{2OT}	0–2–0
*Non-conference game.
