= 1912–13 Cornell Big Red men's ice hockey season =

- Conference: 3rd IHA
- Home ice: Beebe Lake

Record
- Overall: 0–7–0
- Conference: 0–2–0
- Road: 0–2–0
- Neutral: 0–5–0

Coaches and captains
- Head coach: Edmund Magner
- Captain: Edward Scheu

The 1912–13 Cornell Big Red men's ice hockey season was the 12th season of play for the program.

== Season ==
After Harvard had withdrawn from the Intercollegiate Hockey Association in 1911, the league lost both Columbia and Yale before the 1912–13 season. This left the league with just three teams. The final blow came from the formation of the Intercollegiate Hockey League between Harvard, Yale and Princeton, which rendered the IHA superfluous. The IHA would play one final season before dissolving in 1913. Cornell would not be a member of another ice hockey conference until 1961.

On the ice the results for the Big Red were even worse. The offensive punch was still missing and without now-graduated Malcolm Vail to serve as a safety net in goal, the team's goals against ballooned. The team lost every game with only one being remotely close. Former captain Edmund Magner served as coach for the season but after the disastrous results there was little surprise that this was his only season behind the bench.

== Roster ==
No.	Nat.	Player	Class	Pos	Height	Weight	DoB	Hometown	Previous team
	(United States)	Otho M. Clark	Junior	D			1889-05-07	Avon, New York
		Alfred C. Day	Junior	F
		Archie L. Dean Jr.	Senior	G			1891-08-21
		Edward A. Hill	Senior	F			1891-03-10
	(United States)	Clarkson C. Hope	Senior	D			1892-03-19	Roselle, New Jersey
	(United States)	Winthrop Kent	Sophomore	F			1891-03-24	Buffalo, New York
		Kenneth D. Means	Senior	F			1891-07-12
	(United States)	William A. More	Senior	F			1891-05-18	Buffalo, New York
	(United States)	Edward M. Scheu (C)	Senior	W/D			1890-08-28	Buffalo, New York
	(Canada)	Loren B. Smith	Junior	D				Truro, Nova Scotia

== Standings ==
1912–13 Collegiate ice hockey standings
	Intercollegiate							Overall					
	GP	W	L	T	PCT.	GF	GA	GP	W	L	T	GF	GA
Amherst	–	–	–	–	–	–	–	4	1	2	1	–	–
Army	5	4	1	0	.800	15	7	6	5	1	0	42	7
Columbia	1	0	1	0	.000	0	6	2	0	2	0	6	13
Cornell	6	0	6	0	.000	8	41	7	0	7	0	8	51
Dartmouth	10	8	2	0	.800	43	15	10	8	2	0	43	15
Harvard	10	9	1	0	.900	42	14	11	9	2	0	42	16
Massachusetts Agricultural	6	3	3	0	.500	24	19	6	3	3	0	24	19
MIT	5	2	3	0	.400	17	13	9	4	5	0	28	32
Norwich	–	–	–	–	–	–	–	–	–	–	–	–	–
Notre Dame	0	0	0	0	–	0	0	3	1	2	0	7	12
NYU	–	–	–	–	–	–	–	–	–	–	–	–	–
Princeton	11	9	2	0	.818	64	23	14	12	2	0	78	32
Rensselaer	4	0	4	0	.000	2	17	4	0	4	0	2	17
Syracuse	–	–	–	–	–	–	–	–	–	–	–	–	–
Trinity	–	–	–	–	–	–	–	–	–	–	–	–	–
Williams	6	2	3	1	.417	19	24	6	2	3	1	19	24
Yale	7	2	5	0	.286	21	25	9	2	7	0	23	31
YMCA College	–	–	–	–	–	–	–	–	–	–	–	–	–

1912–13 Intercollegiate Hockey Association standings
	Conference							Overall					
	GP	W	L	T	PTS	GF	GA	GP	W	L	T	GF	GA
Princeton *	2	2	0	0	4	12	2	14	12	2	0	78	32
Dartmouth	2	1	1	0	2	9	4	10	8	2	0	43	15
Cornell	2	0	2	0	0	1	16	7	0	7	0	8	51
* indicates conference champion

== Schedule and results ==
Date	Opponent	Site	Result	Record
Regular season
December 26	vs. Princeton*	Arena Ice Rink • Syracuse, New York	L 1–5	0–1–0
December 27	vs. Princeton*	Arena Ice Rink • Syracuse, New York	L 3–5	0–2–0
December 28	vs. Princeton*	Arena Ice Rink • Syracuse, New York	L 1–7	0–3–0
January 11	vs. Princeton	St. Nicholas Rink • New York, New York	L 0–9	0–4–0 (0–1–0)
January 18	at Harvard*	Boston Arena • Boston, Massachusetts	L 2–8	0–5–0
February 15	vs. Dartmouth	Arena Ice Rink • Syracuse, New York	L 1–7	0–6–0 (0–2–0)
February 22	at Toronto*	Toronto, Ontario	L 0–10	0–7–0
*Non-conference game.
