= 1912–13 Dartmouth men's ice hockey season =

- Conference: 2nd IHA
- Home ice: Occom Pond

Record
- Overall: 8–2–0
- Conference: 0–4–0
- Home: 2–0–0
- Road: 4–1–0
- Neutral: 2–1–0

Coaches and captains
- Head coach: Fred Rocque
- Captain: William Mason

The 1912–13 Dartmouth men's ice hockey season was the 8th season of play for the program.

== Season ==
With their fifth coach in as many years, Dartmouth was hoping that they could put the disaster of the previous season behind them. First, however, they would have to get through the imminent collapse of the Intercollegiate Hockey Association, with both Yale and Columbia having withdrawn.

The team opened with a win over MIT, their first in 21 months. They followed that up with a 2–3 loss to Princeton, but after having been embarrassed the year before the result was very encouraging.

Dartmouth played only one more game the remainder of January and the rust showed in their loss to Harvard. Afterwards, however, the Greens recovered with six consecutive wins over a short span of time. Dartmouth finished with a winning record for the first time in four years and their only losses came against the two best teams in the country.

Note: Dartmouth College did not possess a moniker for its athletic teams until the 1920s, however, the university had adopted 'Dartmouth Green' as its school color in 1866.

== Roster ==
No.	Nat.	Player	Class	Pos	Height	Weight	DoB	Hometown	Previous team
		John P. Bowler	Sophomore	C
	(United States)	John Dellinger	Junior	D			1890-12-17	Saint Paul, Minnesota
	(United States)	Arthur I. Donahue	Sophomore	G				Medford, Massachusetts
	(United States)	Henry B. Frost	Junior	LW			1892-08-08	Arlington, Massachusetts	Arlington High School
		Harold T. Johnson	Junior	D
	(United States)	William H. Mason (C)	Senior	C/RW				Boston, Massachusetts
		John D. Pendleton	Sophomore	C
	(United States)	Henry Taylor	Senior	G			1890-12-07	Brooklyn, New York
	(United States)	Leon P. Tuck	Sophomore	C/R	5' 9" (1.75 m)	181 lb (82 kg)	1891-05-25	Winchester, Massachusetts
	(United States)	Clarence L. Wanamaker	Sophomore	R/RW			1892-08-03	Melrose, Massachusetts

== Standings ==
1912–13 Collegiate ice hockey standings
	Intercollegiate							Overall					
	GP	W	L	T	PCT.	GF	GA	GP	W	L	T	GF	GA
Amherst	–	–	–	–	–	–	–	4	1	2	1	–	–
Army	5	4	1	0	.800	15	7	6	5	1	0	42	7
Columbia	1	0	1	0	.000	0	6	2	0	2	0	6	13
Cornell	6	0	6	0	.000	8	41	7	0	7	0	8	51
Dartmouth	10	8	2	0	.800	43	15	10	8	2	0	43	15
Harvard	10	9	1	0	.900	42	14	11	9	2	0	42	16
Massachusetts Agricultural	6	3	3	0	.500	24	19	6	3	3	0	24	19
MIT	5	2	3	0	.400	17	13	9	4	5	0	28	32
Norwich	–	–	–	–	–	–	–	–	–	–	–	–	–
Notre Dame	0	0	0	0	–	0	0	3	1	2	0	7	12
NYU	–	–	–	–	–	–	–	–	–	–	–	–	–
Princeton	11	9	2	0	.818	64	23	14	12	2	0	78	32
Rensselaer	4	0	4	0	.000	2	17	4	0	4	0	2	17
Syracuse	–	–	–	–	–	–	–	–	–	–	–	–	–
Trinity	–	–	–	–	–	–	–	–	–	–	–	–	–
Williams	6	2	3	1	.417	19	24	6	2	3	1	19	24
Yale	7	2	5	0	.286	21	25	9	2	7	0	23	31
YMCA College	–	–	–	–	–	–	–	–	–	–	–	–	–

1912–13 Intercollegiate Hockey Association standings
	Conference							Overall					
	GP	W	L	T	PTS	GF	GA	GP	W	L	T	GF	GA
Princeton *	2	2	0	0	4	12	2	14	12	2	0	78	32
Dartmouth	2	1	1	0	2	9	4	10	8	2	0	43	15
Cornell	2	0	2	0	0	1	16	7	0	7	0	8	51
* indicates conference champion

== Schedule and results ==
Date	Opponent	Site	Result	Record
Regular Season
December 30	at MIT*	Boston Arena • Boston, Massachusetts	W 5–1	1–0–0
January 4	vs. Princeton	St. Nicholas Rink • New York, New York	L 2–3	1–1–0 (0–1–0)
January 11 †	at Massachusetts Agricultural*	Amherst, Massachusetts	W 1–0	2–1–0
February 5	at Harvard*	Boston Arena • Boston, Massachusetts	L 1–3	2–2–0
February 6	at YMCA College*	Springfield, Massachusetts	W 6–1	3–2–0
February 7	vs. Yale*	St. Nicholas Rink • New York, New York	W 3–2	4–2–0
February 12 †	Massachusetts Agricultural*	Occom Pond • Hanover, New Hampshire	W 5–2	5–2–0
February 13	YMCA College*	Occom Pond • Hanover, New Hampshire	W 10–0	6–2–0
February 15	vs. Cornell	Arena Ice Rink • Syracuse, New York	W 7–1	7–2–0 (1–1–0)
February 17	at Syracuse*	Arena Ice Rink • Syracuse, New York	W 3–2	8–2–0
*Non-conference game.

† Mass Ag. only list one game against Dartmouth with the score being 3–5 against. It is possible that the game was combined or split in the record improperly.
