= 1912–13 Williams Ephs men's ice hockey season =

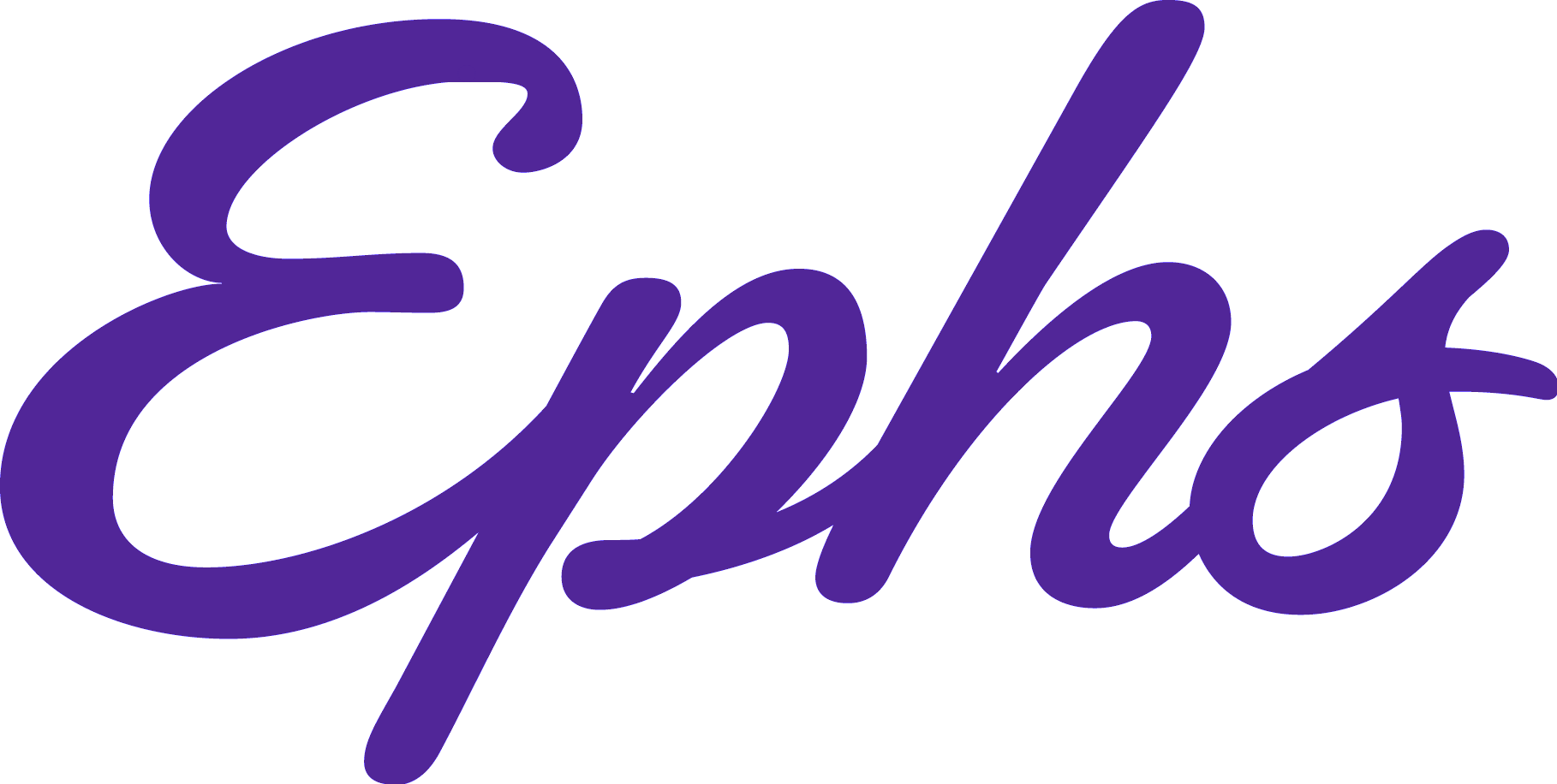
- Home ice: Cole Field House Pond

Record
- Overall: 2–3–1
- Home: 2–1–1
- Road: 0–1–0
- Neutral: 0–1–0

Coaches and captains
- Captain: Eugene deBronkart

The 1912–13 Williams Ephs men's ice hockey season was the 10th season of play for the program.

== Roster ==
No.	Nat.	Player	Class	Pos	Height	Weight	DoB	Hometown	Previous team
		Cole	Sophomore	G
		Theodore B. Conklin	Sophomore	D
		George T. Curtis	Junior	RW
		Conrad F. Cutler	Sophomore	C
	(United States)	Henry H. Cutler	Freshman	R			1892-09-21	Mount Hermon, Massachusetts
	(United States)	Eugene H. de Bronkart	Graduate	C			1888-12-27	Denver, Colorado
		John W. Gillett	Junior	R
		King		RW
		Lewis		RW
	(United States)	Frank A. McNamee Jr.	Sophomore	D			1892-12-17	Albany, New York
	(United States)	Sidney M. Michael (C)	Senior	D			1891-12-23	Buffalo, New York
		Wilson B. Moody	Junior	RW
		Rogers	Junior	G
		Winthrop Swain	Senior	LW

== Standings ==
1912–13 Collegiate ice hockey standings
	Intercollegiate							Overall					
	GP	W	L	T	PCT.	GF	GA	GP	W	L	T	GF	GA
Amherst	–	–	–	–	–	–	–	4	1	2	1	–	–
Army	5	4	1	0	.800	15	7	6	5	1	0	42	7
Columbia	1	0	1	0	.000	0	6	2	0	2	0	6	13
Cornell	6	0	6	0	.000	8	41	7	0	7	0	8	51
Dartmouth	10	8	2	0	.800	43	15	10	8	2	0	43	15
Harvard	10	9	1	0	.900	42	14	11	9	2	0	42	16
Massachusetts Agricultural	6	3	3	0	.500	24	19	6	3	3	0	24	19
MIT	5	2	3	0	.400	17	13	9	4	5	0	28	32
Norwich	–	–	–	–	–	–	–	–	–	–	–	–	–
Notre Dame	0	0	0	0	–	0	0	3	1	2	0	7	12
NYU	–	–	–	–	–	–	–	–	–	–	–	–	–
Princeton	11	9	2	0	.818	64	23	14	12	2	0	78	32
Rensselaer	4	0	4	0	.000	2	17	4	0	4	0	2	17
Syracuse	–	–	–	–	–	–	–	–	–	–	–	–	–
Trinity	–	–	–	–	–	–	–	–	–	–	–	–	–
Williams	6	2	3	1	.417	19	24	6	2	3	1	19	24
Yale	7	2	5	0	.286	21	25	9	2	7	0	23	31
YMCA College	–	–	–	–	–	–	–	–	–	–	–	–	–

== Schedule and results ==
Date	Opponent	Site	Result	Record
Regular Season
December 14	Rensselaer*	Weston Field Rink • Williamstown, Massachusetts	W 7–0	1–0–0
December 20	Princeton*	St. Nicholas Rink • New York, New York	L 1–14	1–1–0
January 11	YMCA College*	Weston Field Rink • Williamstown, Massachusetts	L 0–2	1–2–0
February 15	Amherst*	Weston Field Rink • Williamstown, Massachusetts	T 0–0	1–2–1
February 18	MIT*	Weston Field Rink • Williamstown, Massachusetts	W 4–3	2–2–1
February 20	at Syracuse*	Arena Ice Rink • Syracuse, New York	L 3–5	2–3–1
*Non-conference game.
