= Stubby Magner =

American baseball player

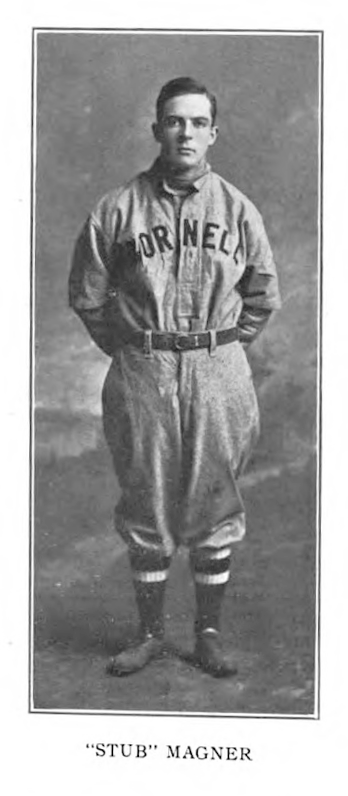
- Shortstop/Second baseman
- Born: February 10, 1888; Kalamazoo, Michigan, U.S.
- Died: September 6, 1956 (aged 68); Chillicothe, Ohio, U.S.
- Batted: Right Threw: Right

MLB debut
- July 12, 1911, for the New York Highlanders

Last MLB appearance
- September 30, 1911, for the New York Highlanders

MLB statistics
- Batting average: .212
- Home runs: 0
- Runs batted in: 4
- Stats at Baseball Reference

Teams
- New York Highlanders (1911)

Edmund Burke (Stubby) Magner (February 10, 1888 – September 6, 1956) was an American Major League Baseball shortstop and second baseman.

== Career ==
Born in Kalamazoo, Michigan, Magner captained Cornell to an undefeated season in 1911, winning an intercollegiate ice hockey championship. After graduating, he played for the New York Highlanders in 1911. In 13 career games, he had 7 hits in 33 at-bats. He batted and threw right-handed. At 5'3", along with Yo-Yo Davalillo he is the shortest person to have played a fielding position in Major League Baseball.

After his brief professional career, Magner became a coach, first returning to his alma mater and the hockey team after the resignation of Talbot Hunter. Magner's tenure was short, lasting only a season, but he managed to produce another perfect campaign, this time going winless in 7 contests. Cornell surrendered 51 goals in 7 games while scoring only 8. In 1915, he coached the University at Buffalo baseball team.

He was a member of the Quill and Dagger society while in college and served as a lieutenant in the U.S. Naval Reserve during World War I. Magner died in Chillicothe, Ohio and is buried at Dayton National Cemetery in Dayton, Ohio.

== College Head coaching record ==
Record table
Season	Team	Overall	Conference	Standing	Postseason
Cornell Big Red (IHA) (1912–1913)
1912–13	Cornell	0–7–0	0–2–0	3rd	
Cornell:		0–7–0	0–2–0		
Total:		0–7–0			
National champion Postseason invitational champion Conference regular season champion Conference regular season and conference tournament champion Division regular season champion Division regular season and conference tournament champion Conference tournament champion
