= 1912–13 Harvard Crimson men's ice hockey season =

College ice hockey season

Intercollegiate, Champion IHL, Champion
- Conference: 1st IHL
- Home ice: Boston Arena

Record
- Overall: 9–2–0
- Conference: 4–1–0
- Home: 7–1–0
- Road: 1–1–0
- Neutral: 1–0–0

Coaches and captains
- Head coach: Alfred Winsor
- Captain: Henry Gardner

The 1912–13 Harvard Crimson men's ice hockey season was the 16th season of play for the program.

== Season ==
Harvard entered the year with a team that may have been less talented than previous squads, but it was no less competitive. The team displayed an increasing level of play throughout December between practices and scrimmages with the Boston Athletic Association. The available ice at the Boston Arena paid dividends for the Crimson in allowing them to hone their game in their attempt to reclaim the championship.

The Crimson made up for last year's poor start with a dominant 4–0 win over MIT where the team used many of its backup players throughout the game. After returning from the winter break Harvard faced a tough Ottawa team and could not find its footing offensively, losing 0–2 despite a stellar effort from team captain Gardner. The team buckled down and prepared itself for a match against Toronto a week later. When the Blues arrived in town they found an impenetrable wall in front of the Harvard cage and left after a 0–2 loss to the Crimson.

After dismantling Cornell 8–2, Harvard welcomed defending champion Princeton in one of the most anticipated games of the season. The teams locked horns and battled nearly the same as they had the year before; Princeton's offense, led by Hobey Baker applied a continual assault on the Crimson defenders but neither team could beat the other in regulation. With the score 3–3 the two teams had agreed to play two 5-minute overtime periods in case they were needed. Harvard was able to score once in each extra frame and take the game 5–3, putting themselves at a great advantage in their pursuit of a championship.

By the time Harvard played Yale on February 1, the teams had arranged a best-of-three series so that Harvard, Yale and Princeton would play one another at least twice. If any of the three emerged as a clear victor they would likely be able to claim the collegiate championship as the teams were typically among the best in the nation. Harvard's solid win over the Bulldogs had them on the cusp of a terrific season but in the second game against Princeton the Tiger attack was too much to cope with and a third game was required to settle the series. While the third game would not officially decide the champion, as Harvard still had Yale left to play, Princeton could secure the championship if it won the rubber match. With this in mind Gardner produced one of the most brilliant goaltending performances in school history, turning away 29 shots en route to a 3–0 victory, the only time in the three years with Baker that Princeton would fail to score.

With Yale still remaining, Harvard couldn't slow down if they wanted to claim the championship. The Elis played Harvard tough in the first half, scoring the only goal of the frame to put a bit of fear in the minds of the Crimson faithful. The game remained the same through most of the second half but with 5 minutes left the Crimson offense awoke and scored three times. Yale added one just before the end of the game but it wasn't enough to turn the tide and Harvard skated away with the collegiate hockey championship.

== Roster ==
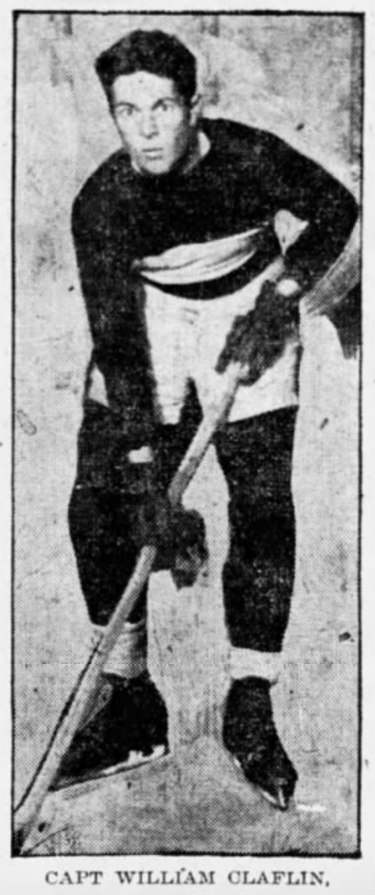
William Claflin ca. 1914

| No. | Nat. | Player | Class | Pos | Height | Weight | DoB | Hometown | Previous team |
|---|---|---|---|---|---|---|---|---|---|
| | (United States) | Herbert Baldwin | Senior | LW | 5' 9" (1.75 m) | 146 lb (66 kg) | 1891-08-11 | Wellesley Hills, Massachusetts | Volkmann School |
| | (United States) | Philip M. Brown | Sophomore | D | | | 1892-11-18 | New Ipswich, New Hampshire |
| | (United States) | Gouverneur Carnochan | Junior | G | | 142 lb (64 kg) | 1892-06-28 | Manhattan, New York | St. Paul's School |
| | (United States) | William H. Claflin Jr. | Sophomore | D/RW | | 156 lb (71 kg) | 1893-06-08 | Swampscott, Massachusetts | Noble and Greenough School |
| | (United States) | Sydney Clark | Junior | C/RW | | 154 lb (70 kg) | | Chestnut Hill, Pennsylvania | Pomfret School |
| | (United States) | John C. Devereux | Junior | RW | | 146 lb (66 kg) | | Utica, New York | Milton Academy |
| | | Henry H. Gardner (C) | Senior | G | 5' 9" (1.75 m) | 152 lb (69 kg) |
| | | Alfred Goodale | Senior | D |
| | | Thomas Gorham | Senior | C |
| | | Edward Graustein | Senior | D |
| | (United States) | Edward O. Handy | Sophomore | D | | | 1894-03-19 | Cleveland, Ohio |
| | | Donald Hanson | Junior | C/LW | 5' 11" (1.8 m) | 161 lb (73 kg) | | | Melrose High |
| | (United States) | Steve Hopkins | Junior | C/LW | | 158 lb (72 kg) | 1892-03-19 | Newtonville, Massachusetts | Newton High School |
| | | Henry Morgan | Junior | RW | 5' 9" (1.75 m) | 167 lb (76 kg) | | | St. Mark's School |
| | (United States) | Franklin Palmer | Senior | C/LW | 5' 8" (1.73 m) | 141 lb (64 kg) | | Plattsburgh, New York |
| | (United States) | Morgan Phillips | Sophomore | C/LW | | 180 lb (82 kg) | 1894-10-22 | Newton Center, Massachusetts | Milton Academy |
| | (Canada) | Paul Smart | Junior | D | | 141 lb (64 kg) | | Yarmouth, Nova Scotia | Newton High School |
| | (United States) | Alvin Sortwell | Junior | LW | 5' 6" (1.68 m) | 146 lb (66 kg) | | Wiscasset, Maine | St. Paul's School |
| | (United States) | Percy Wendell | Senior | D | | | 1889-07-16 | Roxbury, Massachusetts |
| | (United States) | William Willetts | Junior | D | | 181 lb (82 kg) | 1890-05-13 | Skaneateles, New York | St. Paul's School |

== Standings ==
1912–13 Collegiate ice hockey standings
| | Intercollegiate | | | | | | | Overall | | | | | |
| | GP | W | L | T | PCT. | GF | GA | GP | W | L | T | GF | GA |
|---|---|---|---|---|---|---|---|---|---|---|---|---|---|
| Amherst | – | – | – | – | – | – | – | 4 | 1 | 2 | 1 | – | – |
| Army | 5 | 4 | 1 | 0 | .800 | 15 | 7 | 6 | 5 | 1 | 0 | 42 | 7 |
| Columbia | 1 | 0 | 1 | 0 | .000 | 0 | 6 | 2 | 0 | 2 | 0 | 6 | 13 |
| Cornell | 6 | 0 | 6 | 0 | .000 | 8 | 41 | 7 | 0 | 7 | 0 | 8 | 51 |
| Dartmouth | 10 | 8 | 2 | 0 | .800 | 43 | 15 | 10 | 8 | 2 | 0 | 43 | 15 |
| Harvard | 10 | 9 | 1 | 0 | .900 | 42 | 14 | 11 | 9 | 2 | 0 | 42 | 16 |
| Massachusetts Agricultural | 6 | 3 | 3 | 0 | .500 | 24 | 19 | 6 | 3 | 3 | 0 | 24 | 19 |
| MIT | 5 | 2 | 3 | 0 | .400 | 17 | 13 | 9 | 4 | 5 | 0 | 28 | 32 |
| Norwich | – | – | – | – | – | – | – | – | – | – | – | – | – |
| Notre Dame | 0 | 0 | 0 | 0 | – | 0 | 0 | 3 | 1 | 2 | 0 | 7 | 12 |
| NYU | – | – | – | – | – | – | – | – | – | – | – | – | – |
| Princeton | 11 | 9 | 2 | 0 | .818 | 64 | 23 | 14 | 12 | 2 | 0 | 78 | 32 |
| Rensselaer | 4 | 0 | 4 | 0 | .000 | 2 | 17 | 4 | 0 | 4 | 0 | 2 | 17 |
| Syracuse | – | – | – | – | – | – | – | – | – | – | – | – | – |
| Trinity | – | – | – | – | – | – | – | – | – | – | – | – | – |
| Williams | 6 | 2 | 3 | 1 | .417 | 19 | 24 | 6 | 2 | 3 | 1 | 19 | 24 |
| Yale | 7 | 2 | 5 | 0 | .286 | 21 | 25 | 9 | 2 | 7 | 0 | 23 | 31 |
| YMCA College | – | – | – | – | – | – | – | – | – | – | – | – | – |

1912–13 Intercollegiate Hockey League standings
| | Conference | | | | | | | | Overall | | | | | |
| | GP | W | L | T | PTS | SW | GF | GA | GP | W | L | T | GF | GA |
|---|---|---|---|---|---|---|---|---|---|---|---|---|---|---|
| Harvard * | 5 | 4 | 1 | 0 | .800 | 2 | 16 | 8 | 11 | 9 | 2 | 0 | 42 | 16 |
| Princeton | 5 | 3 | 2 | 0 | .600 | 1 | 21 | 13 | 14 | 12 | 2 | 0 | 78 | 32 |
| Yale | 4 | 0 | 4 | 0 | .000 | 0 | 9 | 22 | 9 | 2 | 7 | 0 | 23 | 31 |
* indicates conference champion

== Schedule and results ==
| Date | Opponent | Site | Result | Record |
Regular Season
| December 18 | vs. MIT* | Boston Arena • Boston, Massachusetts | W 4–0 | 1–0–0 |
| January 6 | Ottawa* | Boston Arena • Boston, Massachusetts | L 0–2 | 1–1–0 |
| January 15 | Toronto* | Boston Arena • Boston, Massachusetts | W 2–0 | 2–1–0 |
| January 18 | Cornell* | Boston Arena • Boston, Massachusetts | W 8–2 | 3–1–0 |
| January 22 | Princeton | Boston Arena • Boston, Massachusetts | W 5–3 | 4–1–0 (1–0–0) |
| January 27 | Massachusetts Agricultural* | Boston Arena • Boston, Massachusetts | W 9–3 | 5–1–0 |
| February 1 | Yale | Boston Arena • Boston, Massachusetts (Rivalry) | W 4–0 | 6–1–0 (2–0–0) |
| February 5 | Dartmouth* | Boston Arena • Boston, Massachusetts | W 3–1 | 7–1–0 |
| February 8 | vs. Princeton | St. Nicholas Rink • New York, New York | L 1–3 | 7–2–0 (2–1–0) |
| February 15 | Princeton | Boston Arena • Boston, Massachusetts | W 3–0 | 8–2–0 (3–1–0) |
| February 19 | vs. Yale | St. Nicholas Rink • New York, New York (Rivalry) | W 3–2 | 9–2–0 (4–1–0) |
*Non-conference game.

== Scoring Statistics ==
| Name | Position | Games | Goals |
|---|---|---|---|
| Morgan Philips | C | 10 | 13 |
| Alvin Sortwell | C | 10 | 11 |
| Steve Hopkins | LW | 10 | 5 |
| William Clafin | D/RW | 7 | 2 |
| Henry Morgan | RW | 7 | 2 |
| Alfred Goodale | D | 8 | 2 |
| Thomas Gorham | C | 4 | 1 |
| Paul Smart | RW | 4 | 1 |
| Sydney Clark | C/RW | 6 | 1 |
| William Willetts | D | 10 | 1 |
| Edward Handy | D | 1 | 0 |
| Herbert Baldwin | LW | 2 | 0 |
| Philip Brown | D | 2 | 0 |
| John Devereaux | RW | 2 | 0 |
| Edward Graustein | D | 2 | 0 |
| Percy Wendell | D | 2 | 0 |
| Gouverneur Carnochan | G | 3 | 0 |
| Donald Hanson | LW | 3 | 0 |
| Franklin Palmer | C | 5 | 0 |
| Henry Gardner | G | 9 | 0 |
| Total | | | † |

Note: Assists were not recorded as a statistic.
† Statistics from the game against Dartmouth are not available.
