= 1912–13 MIT Engineers men's ice hockey season =

- Conference: Independent
- Home ice: Boston Arena

Record
- Overall: 4–5–0
- Home: 1–2–0
- Road: 4–1–0
- Neutral: 1–1–0

Coaches and captains
- Captain: Alfred Ranney

The 1912–13 MIT Engineers men's ice hockey season was the 14th season of play for the program.

== Season ==
The team did not have a head coach but Frederick Hurlbutt and Norman MacLeod served as team managers.

Note: Massachusetts Institute of Technology athletics were referred to as 'Engineers' or 'Techmen' during the first two decades of the 20th century. By 1920 all sports programs had adopted the Engineer moniker.

== Roster ==
No.	Nat.	Player	Class	Pos	Height	Weight	DoB	Hometown	Previous team
		William N. Eichorn	Senior	D
		Ralph L. Fletcher	Sophomore	RW
		Charles L. Foote	Freshman	LW
		Frederick L. Hurlbutt	Junior	R
		Norman D. MacLeod	Junior	C
		Alfred G. Ranney (C)	Senior	G
		Clarence B. Rogers	Junior
		Carl L. Stucklen	Senior	D

== Standings ==
1912–13 Collegiate ice hockey standings
	Intercollegiate							Overall					
	GP	W	L	T	PCT.	GF	GA	GP	W	L	T	GF	GA
Amherst	–	–	–	–	–	–	–	4	1	2	1	–	–
Army	5	4	1	0	.800	15	7	6	5	1	0	42	7
Columbia	1	0	1	0	.000	0	6	2	0	2	0	6	13
Cornell	6	0	6	0	.000	8	41	7	0	7	0	8	51
Dartmouth	10	8	2	0	.800	43	15	10	8	2	0	43	15
Harvard	10	9	1	0	.900	42	14	11	9	2	0	42	16
Massachusetts Agricultural	6	3	3	0	.500	24	19	6	3	3	0	24	19
MIT	5	2	3	0	.400	17	13	9	4	5	0	28	32
Norwich	–	–	–	–	–	–	–	–	–	–	–	–	–
Notre Dame	0	0	0	0	–	0	0	3	1	2	0	7	12
NYU	–	–	–	–	–	–	–	–	–	–	–	–	–
Princeton	11	9	2	0	.818	64	23	14	12	2	0	78	32
Rensselaer	4	0	4	0	.000	2	17	4	0	4	0	2	17
Syracuse	–	–	–	–	–	–	–	–	–	–	–	–	–
Trinity	–	–	–	–	–	–	–	–	–	–	–	–	–
Williams	6	2	3	1	.417	19	24	6	2	3	1	19	24
Yale	7	2	5	0	.286	21	25	9	2	7	0	23	31
YMCA College	–	–	–	–	–	–	–	–	–	–	–	–	–

== Schedule and results ==
Date	Opponent	Site	Result	Record
Regular Season
December 4	vs. Pilgrim Athletic Association*	Boston Arena • Boston, Massachusetts	W 4–3	1–0–0
December 7	vs. Pilgrim Athletic Association*	Boston Arena • Boston, Massachusetts	W 4–3	2–0–0
December 11	vs. Boston Athletic Association*	Boston Arena • Boston, Massachusetts	L 1–7	2–1–0
December 18	vs. Harvard*	Boston Arena • Boston, Massachusetts	L 0–4	2–2–0
December 30	Dartmouth*	Boston Arena • Boston, Massachusetts	L 1–5	2–3–0
February 5	at Syracuse*	Arena Ice Rink • Syracuse, New York	W 8–0	3–3–0
February 6	at Syracuse Hockey Club*	Arena Ice Rink • Syracuse, New York	L 2–6	3–4–0
February 8	at Army*	West Point, New York	W 5–0	4–4–0
February 18	at Williams*	Weston Field Rink • Williamstown, Massachusetts	L 3–4	4–5–0
*Non-conference game.
