= Marsha Harris =

American basketball player

Marsha Harris was the female winner of the 1998 Walter Byers Award, the National Collegiate Athletic Association's highest academic honor, in recognition of being the nation's top female scholar-athlete. She was a two-time Kodak Division III All-American who scored the winning basket for the New York University Violets women's basketball team in the 1997 NCAA Division III National Championship game resulting in a 72–70 victory over University of Wisconsin–Eau Claire. As of 2005 she was the University Athletic Association's all-time leading scorer and she was in her third year as a surgical resident at the New York University School of Medicine.
