= 1997 NAIA Division II men's basketball tournament =

- Teams: 32
- Finals site: Montgomery Fieldhouse, Nampa, Idaho
- Champions: Bethel Pilots (2nd title, 2nd title game, 2nd Fab Four)
- Runner-up: Siena Heights Saints (1st title game, 1st Fab Four)
- Semifinalists: Tabor Bluejays (1st Fab Four); William Jewell Cardinals (4th Fab Four)
- Charles Stevenson Hustle Award: Anthony Staffney (Siena Heights)
- Chuck Taylor MVP: Rico Swanson (Bethel (IN))
- Top scorer: Rico Swanson (Bethel (TN)) (100 points)

The 1997 NAIA Division II men's basketball tournament was the tournament held by the NAIA to determine the national champion of men's college basketball among its Division II members in the United States and Canada for the 1996–97 basketball season.

Bethel (IN) defeated Siena Heights in the championship game, 95–94, to claim the Pilots' second NAIA national title and first since 1995.

The tournament was played at the Montgomery Fieldhouse at Northwest Nazarene University in Nampa, Idaho.

== Qualification ==
The tournament field remained fixed at thirty-two teams, and the top sixteen teams were seeded.

The tournament continued to utilize a single-elimination format.

== Bracket ==
First round
1	St. Thomas Aquinas	73
Holy Names College	63
Taylor	51
16	Tabor	70
9	Northwest Nazarene	84
Virginia Intermont	66
Howard Payne	94
8	Evangel	95
5	Siena Heights	87
South Dakota Tech	79
Wisconsin Lutheran	60
12	Embry–Riddle (FL)	66
13	Peru State	100
College of the Ozarks	101**
Husson	68
4	Pacific (OR)	79
3	Oregon Tech	77
Mayville State	69
Tennessee Wesleyan	68
14	William Jewell	84
11	Black Hills State	82
Philadelphia Pharmacy	64
Concordia Nebraska	66
6	Urbana (OH)	79
7	Spring Arbor	71
St. Thomas (FL)	70
IU Southeast	73
10	Lewis & Clark	98
15	Western Baptist	82
Saint Ambrose	71
Green Mountain	75
2	Bethel (IN)	123

Second round
1	St. Thomas Aquinas	55
16	Tabor	66
9	Northwest Nazarene	99
8	Evangel	81
5	Siena Heights	83
12	Embry–Riddle (FL)	79
College of the Ozarks	86
4	Pacific (OR)	74
3	Oregon Tech	78
14	William Jewell	88
11	Black Hills State	93
6	Urbana (OH)	79
7	Spring Arbor	82
10	Lewis & Clark	79
15	Western Baptist	78
2	Bethel (IN)	80

Quarterfinals
16	Tabor	81
9	Northwest Nazarene	75
5	Siena Heights	94
College of the Ozarks	84
14	William Jewell	83
11	Black Hills State	77
7	Spring Arbor	83
2	Bethel (IN)	94

Semifinals
16	Tabor	80
5	Siena Heights	89
14	William Jewell	73
2	Bethel (IN)	99

National championship
5	Siena Heights	94
2	Bethel (IN)	95

== See also ==
- 1997 NAIA Division I men's basketball tournament
- 1997 NCAA Division I men's basketball tournament
- 1997 NCAA Division II men's basketball tournament
- 1997 NCAA Division III men's basketball tournament
- 1997 NAIA Division II women's basketball tournament
