= 1997 NAIA Division I men's basketball tournament =

College basketball tournament

- Teams: 32
- Finals site: Mabee Center; Tulsa, Oklahoma
- Champions: Life (1 title, 2 title game, 2 Fab Four)
- Runner-up: Oklahoma Baptist (5 title game, 6 Fab Four)
- Semifinalists: Point Park (1 Final Four); Cumberland (1 Final Four)
- Charles Stevenson Hustle Award: Kevin Morrissey (Oklahoma Baptist)
- Chuck Taylor MVP: James Harris (Life)

The 1997 NAIA Men's Division I Basketball Tournament was held in March at the Mabee Center in Tulsa, Oklahoma. The 60th annual NAIA basketball tournament featured 32 teams competing in a single-elimination format.

== Awards and honors ==
- Leading scorers:
- Leading rebounder:
- Player of the Year: Juergen Malbeck (Hawaii Pacific).

== 1997 NAIA bracket ==
First round	Second round
1	Life	107
-	Huston–Tillotson	68
1	Life	81
-	BYU–Hawaii	65
-	BYU–Hawaii	82
16	Transylvania	67
TOP TIER
9	SE Oklahoma State	90
-	Carroll (MT)	53
9	Southeastern Oklahoma	67
8	Birmingham Southern	73
8	Birmingham–Southern	73
-	The Master’s	70
-	Central Washington	61
5	Incarnate Word	58
-	Central Washington	87
12	Azusa Pacific	76
12	Azusa Pacific	61
-	Columbia (MO)	55*
TOP TIER
13	Cumberlands	71
-	Southern Nazarene	50
13	Cumberlands	53
-	Dillard	50
-	Dillard	'83
4	Benedict	74
3	Oklahoma Baptist	74
-	Lindsey Wilson	68
3	Oklahoma Baptist	39
14	Biola	36
14	Biola	97
-	Georgia Southwestern State	74
BOTTOM TIER
-	McKendree	67
11	St. Mary's (TX)	57
-	McKendree	76
6	Findlay	70
6	Findlay	72
-	Olivet Nazarene	61
-	Point Park	111
7	Lipscomb	100
-	Point Park	71
-	Claflin	70
-	Claflin	57
10	East Central (OK)	50
BOTTOM TIER
15	Georgetown (KY)	66
-	Phillips	64
15	Georgetown (KY)	70
2	Hawaii Pacific	88
2	Hawaii Pacific	82
-	William Carey	79

Elite Eight
1	Life	66
8	Birmingham Southern	64
-	Central Washington	68
13	Cumberlands	89
3	Oklahoma Baptist	82
-	McKendree	73
-	Point Park	88
2	Hawaii Pacific	84*

NAIA national semifinals
1	Life	69
13	Cumberlands	52
3	Oklahoma Baptist	93
-	Point Park	75

NAIA national championship
1	Life	73
3	Oklahoma Baptist	64

- * denotes overtime.

== See also ==
- 1997 NAIA Division I women's basketball tournament
- 1997 NCAA Division I men's basketball tournament
- 1997 NCAA Division II men's basketball tournament
- 1997 NCAA Division III men's basketball tournament
- 1997 NAIA Division II men's basketball tournament
