= 1997 NCAA Division III men's basketball tournament =

American collegiate men's basketball tournament (1997)

- Teams: 64
- Finals site: , Salem, Virginia
- Champions: Illinois Wesleyan Titans (1st title)
- Runner-up: Nebraska Wesleyan Plainsmen (1st title game)
- Semifinalists: Williams Ephs (1st Final Four); Alvernia Crusaders (1st Final Four)
- Winning coach: Dennie Bridges (IWU)
- MOP: Bryan Crabtree (IWU)
- Attendance: 59,784

The 1997 NCAA Division III men's basketball tournament was the 23rd annual single-elimination tournament to determine the national champions of National Collegiate Athletic Association (NCAA) men's Division III collegiate basketball in the United States.

The field contained sixty-four teams, and each program was allocated to one of four sectionals. All sectional games were played on campus sites, while the national semifinals, third-place final, and championship finals were contested at the Salem Civic Center in Salem, Virginia.

Illinois Wesleyan defeated Nebraska Wesleyan, 89–86, in the final, clinching their first national title.

The Titans (29–2) were coached by Dennie Bridges. Bryan Crabtree, also from Illinois Wesleyan, was named Most Outstanding Player.

== Bracket ==
=== Top left sectional ===
First round
Widener	70
Dickinson	62
Salisbury State	101
Wilkes	90
St. Lawrence	63
Brockport State	64
St. John Fisher	77
Cortland State	70
Alvernia	69
Lebanon Valley	55
Goucher	67
Cabrini	60
Buffalo State	70
Hamilton	66
RIT	65
Rochester	64

Second round
Widener	65
Salisbury State	77
Brockport State	73
St. John Fisher	68
Alvernia	60
Goucher	55
Buffalo State	106
RIT	111**

Sectional semifinals
Salisbury State	79
Brockport	78
Alvernia	77
RIT	71

Sectional finals
Salisbury State	84
Alvernia	89

=== Bottom left sectional ===
First round
Hampden–Sydney	74
Christopher Newport	79
Methodist	67
Roanoke	63
Chicago	59
Benedictine (IL)	52
Wabash	69
Lawrence	63
Sewanee	68
Rust	61
Maryville (TN)	62
Bridgewater (VA)	64
Rose–Hulman	86
Washington–St. Louis	69
Illinois Wesleyan	105
Maryville (MO)	66

Second round
Christopher Newport	67
Methodist	72
Chicago	78
Wabash	70
Sewanee	62
Bridgewater (VA)	65
Rose–Hulman	53
Illinois Wesleyan	54

Sectional semifinals
Methodist	74
Chicago	70
Bridgewater (VA)	60
Illinois Wesleyan	87

Sectional finals
Methodist	63
Illinois Wesleyan	95

=== Top right sectional ===
First round
Rowan	72
Mount Saint Vincent	53
NYU	94
Jersey City State	84
UMass Dartmouth	63
Tufts	65
Salem State	69
Springfield	61
William Paterson	51
Kings Point	43
Richard Stockton	78
York (NY)	71
Amherst	83
Colby	60
Williams	76
Wentworth	51

Second round
Rowan	56
NYU	53
Tufts	63
Salem State	83
William Paterson	60
Richard Stockton	64
Amherst	63
Williams	86

Sectional semifinals
Rowan	82
Salem State	72
Richard Stockton	61
Williams	85

Sectional finals
Rowan	62
Williams	71

=== Bottom right sectional ===
First round
Hope	69
Denison	66
Ohio Northern	58
Wooster	84
UW–Whitewater	67
Gustavus Adolphus	82
Nebraska Wesleyan	93
Buena Vista	54
Wittenberg	82
John Carroll	68
Mount Union	77
Alfred	69
Pomona–Pitzer	58
UW–Stevens Point	68
UW–Platteville	51
UW–Oshkosh	43

Second round
Hope	67
Wooster	56
Gustavus Adolphus	59
Nebraska Wesleyan	61
Wittenberg	65
Mount Union	73
UW–Stevens Point	46
UW–Platteville	43

Sectional semifinals
Hope	75
Nebraska Wesleyan	92
Mount Union	67
UW–Stevens Point	68*

Sectional finals
Nebraska Wesleyan	69
UW–Stevens Point	66

=== National finals ===
- Site: Salem Civic Center, Salem, Virginia

National Semifinals
Alvernia	82
Illinois Wesleyan	85
Williams	90
Nebraska Wesleyan	101

National Championship
Illinois Wesleyan	89
Nebraska Wesleyan	86
National Third-place
Alvernia	77
Williams	78

== See also ==
- 1997 NCAA Division III women's basketball tournament
- 1997 NCAA Division I men's basketball tournament
- 1997 NCAA Division II men's basketball tournament
- 1997 NAIA Division I men's basketball tournament
- 1997 NAIA Division II men's basketball tournament
