= 1997 NAIA Division I women's basketball tournament =

- Teams: 32
- Finals site: Oman Arena, Jackson, Tennessee
- Champions: Southern Nazarene Redskins (5th title, 5th title game, 6th Fab Four)
- Runner-up: Union (TN) Bulldogs (2nd title game, 3rd Fab Four)
- Semifinalists: Arkansas Tech Golden Suns (4th Fab Four); SW Oklahoma State Bulldogs (10th Fab Four)
- Coach of the year: Craig Wiginton (Southern Nazarene)
- Charles Stevenson Hustle Award: Tonna Woolery (Southern Nazarene)
- Chuck Taylor MVP: Astou Ndiaye (Southern Nazarene)
- Top scorer: Hazel Taylor (Wayland Baptist) (82 points)

The 1997 NAIA Division I women's basketball tournament was the tournament held by the NAIA to determine the national champion of women's college basketball among its Division I members in the United States and Canada for the 1996–97 basketball season.

Three-time defending champions Southern Nazarene defeated Union (TN) in the championship game, 78–73, to claim the Redskins' fifth NAIA national title.

The tournament was played at the Oman Arena in Jackson, Tennessee.

== Qualification ==
The tournament field remained fixed at thirty-two teams, with the top sixteen teams receiving seeds.

The tournament continued to utilize a simple single-elimination format.

== Bracket ==
First round
1	Arkansas Tech	89**
Tougaloo	79
St. Mary's (TX)	72
16	Lipscomb	86
9	Wayland Baptist	90
Transylvania	72
Concordia Irvine	68
8	Lewis–Clark State	90
5	Central State (OH)	91
Indiana–South Bend	55
Mary Hardin-Baylor	71
12	Montana State Northern	62
13	East Central (OK)	68
Freed–Hardeman	76
Voorhees	53
4	Southern Nazarene	92
3	Union (TN)	87
Daemen	53
Auburn Montgomery	66
14	SE Oklahoma State	78
11	Xavier Louisiana	77
LeTourneau	52
North Georgia	78
6	Oklahoma Baptist	104
7	SW Oklahoma State	85
Rio Grande	55
Claflin	64
10	Harding	66
15	Campbellsville	75
Oklahoma Christian	72
Hannibal–LaGrange	35
2	Simon Fraser	71

Second round
1	Arkansas Tech	73
16	Lipscomb	49
9	Wayland Baptist	66
8	Lewis–Clark State	65
5	Central State (OH)	80
Mary Hardin-Baylor	63
Freed–Hardeman	70
4	Southern Nazarene	77
3	Union (TN)	69
14	SE Oklahoma State	67
11	Xavier Louisiana	63
6	Oklahoma Baptist	71
7	SW Oklahoma State	57
10	Harding	56
15	Campbellsville	44
2	Simon Fraser	71

Elite Eight
1	Arkansas Tech	60
9	Wayland Baptist	59
5	Central State	61
4	Southern Nazarene	80
3	Union (TN)	82
6	Oklahoma Baptist	69
7	SW Oklahoma State	73
2	Simon Fraser	69

Final Four
1	Arkansas Tech	58
4	Southern Nazarene	61
3	Union (TN)	68
7	SW Oklahoma State	69

National championship
4	Southern Nazarene	78
3	Union (TN)	73

== See also ==
- 1997 NAIA Division I men's basketball tournament
- 1997 NCAA Division I women's basketball tournament
- 1997 NCAA Division II women's basketball tournament
- 1997 NCAA Division III women's basketball tournament
- 1997 NAIA Division II women's basketball tournament
