= 1997 NCAA Division II men's basketball tournament =

- Teams: 48
- Finals site: Commonwealth Convention Center, Louisville, Kentucky
- Champions: Cal State Bakersfield (3rd title)
- Runner-up: Northern Kentucky (2nd title game)
- Semifinalists: Lynn (1st Final Four); Salem-Teikyo (1st Final Four)
- Winning coach: Pat Douglass (3rd title)
- MOP: Kebu Stewart (CSUB)

The 1997 NCAA Division II men's basketball tournament was the 41st annual single-elimination tournament to determine the national champion of men's NCAA Division II college basketball in the United States.

The tournament officially culminated the 1996–97 NCAA Division II men's basketball season, featuring forty-eight teams from around the country.

The national quarterfinals (Elite Eight), semifinals, and championship were played at the Commonwealth Convention Center in Louisville, Kentucky.

Cal State Bakersfield (29–4) defeated Northern Kentucky in the final, 57–56, to win their third overall Division II national championship and their third in five seasons.

It was also NKU's second consecutive loss in the national championship game, having lost to Fort Hays State in 1996.

Despite being the defending national champions with only one loss on the season, Fort Hays State had to travel from Kansas to South Dakota for the North Central Regional hosted by 4 loss South Dakota State.

The CSB Roadrunners were coached by Pat Douglass. Bakersfield's Kebu Stewart was the Most Outstanding Player.

1997 NCAA Division II Men's sites - regionals (cyan) Elite Eight (red)

== Regionals ==
=== South - Huntsville, Alabama ===
Location: Elmore Coliseum Host: Alabama A&M University

First round Round of 48; March 6
4	Delta State	88
5	Albany State	64
3	Tampa	83
6	West Georgia	61

Regional semifinals Round of 32; March 7
1	Alabama A&M	81
4	Delta State	80
2	Lynn	81
3	Tampa	76

Regional final Sweet 16; March 8
1	Alabama A&M	82
2	Lynn	87

=== North Central - Brookings, South Dakota ===
Location: Frost Arena Host: South Dakota State

First round Round of 48; March 7
4	Northern State	89
5	North Dakota State (OT)	90
3	Minnesota-Duluth	76
6	Nebraska–Kearney	90

Regional semifinals Round of 32; March 8
1	Fort Hays State	82
5	North Dakota State	78
2	South Dakota State	102
6	Nebraska–Kearney	83

Regional final Sweet 16; March 9
1	Fort Hays State	74
2	South Dakota State	86

=== Great Lakes - Indianapolis, Indiana ===
Location: Nicoson Hall Host: University of Indianapolis

First round Round of 48; March 6
4	Grand Valley State	74
5	Oakland	79
3	Southern Indiana	118
6	Quincy (3OT)	125

Regional semifinals Round of 32; March 7
1	Indianapolis	72
5	Oakland	75
2	Northern Kentucky	82
6	Quincy	54

Regional final Sweet 16; March 8
5	Oakland	87
2	Northern Kentucky	101

=== South Central - Edmond, Oklahoma ===
Location: Hamilton Field House Host: University of Central Oklahoma

First round Round of 48; March 6
4	Missouri Western	70
5	Pittsburg State	72
3	Texas A&M–Commerce	80
6	Central Missouri State	74

Regional semifinals Round of 32; March 7
1	Central Oklahoma	84
5	Pittsburg State	90
2	Washburn	75
3	Texas A&M–Commerce	80

Regional final Sweet 16; March 8
5	Pittsburg State	83
3	Texas A&M–Commerce	89

=== South Atlantic - Durham, North Carolina ===
Location: McDougald–McLendon Arena Host: North Carolina Central University

First round Round of 48; March 6
4	Georgia College & State	87
5	St. Augustine's	93
3	Elizabeth City State	77
6	Elon	70

Regional semifinals Round of 32; March 7
1	North Carolina Central	66
5	St. Augustine's	78
2	Presbyterian	64
3	Elizabeth City State	76

Regional final Sweet 16; March 8
5	St. Augustine's	73
3	Elizabeth City State	90

=== East - Salem, West Virginia ===
Location: T. Edward Davis Gymnasium Host: Salem-Teikyo University

First round Round of 48; March 6
4	Pittsburgh-Johnstown	92
5	High Point (OT)	94
3	Barton	74
6	Concord	79

Regional semifinals Round of 32; March 7
1	Salem-Teikyo	91
5	High Point	82
2	Mansfield	96
6	Concord	111

Regional final Sweet 16; March 8
1	Salem-Teikyo	85
6	Concord	76

=== Northeast - Manchester, New Hampshire ===
Location: NHC Fieldhouse Host: New Hampshire College

First round Round of 48; March 7
4	St. Michael's (OT)	86
5	Adelphi	85
3	St. Rose	92
6	Le Moyne	76

Regional semifinals Round of 32; March 8
1	New Hampshire College	101
4	St. Michael's	90
2	Southern Connecticut State	83
3	St. Rose	80

Regional final Sweet 16; March 9
1	New Hampshire College	61
2	Southern Connecticut State	80

=== West - Bakersfield, California ===
Location: CSUB Student Activities Center Host: California State University, Bakersfield

First round Round of 48; March 6
4	Grand Canyon	78
5	Cal Davis	66
3	Montana State-Billings	97
6	Cal Riverside	86

Regional semifinals Round of 32; March 7
1	Cal State Bakersfield	80
4	Grand Canyon	70
2	Alaska-Anchorage	67
3	Montana State-Billings	97

Regional final Sweet 16; March 8
1	Cal State Bakersfield	90
3	Montana State-Billings	78

== Elite Eight-Louisville, Kentucky ==
Location: Commonwealth Convention Center Host: Bellarmine College

National Quarterfinals; Elite Eight; March 19
W	Cal State Bakersfield	65
NE	Southern Connecticut State	62
E	Salem-Teikyo	91
SA	Elizabeth City State	74
Louisville, Kentucky
S	Lynn	78
NC	South Dakota State	72
GL	Northern Kentucky	79
S	Texas A&M–Commerce	58

National semifinals Final Four; March 20
W	Cal State Bakersfield	81
E	Salem-Teikyo	68
S	Lynn	58
GL	Northern Kentucky	79

National championship March 22
W	Cal State Bakersfield	57
GL	Northern Kentucky	56

== All-tournament team ==
- Kebu Stewart, Cal State Bakersfield (MOP)
- Cliff Clinton, Northern Kentucky
- Paul Cluxton, Northern Kentucky
- Shannon Minor, Northern Kentucky
- Terrance Springer, Salem-Teikyo

== See also ==
- 1997 NCAA Division II women's basketball tournament
- 1997 NCAA Division I men's basketball tournament
- 1997 NCAA Division III men's basketball tournament
- 1997 NAIA Division I men's basketball tournament
- 1997 NAIA Division II men's basketball tournament
