= List of NYU Violets head football coaches =

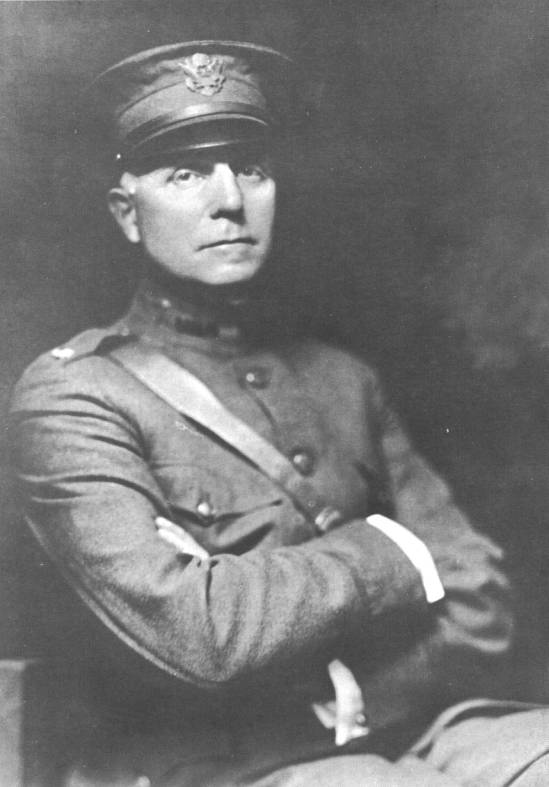
John A. Hartwell was the first head coach at NYU and played on the 1891 national championship team at Yale.

The NYU Violets football program was a college football team that represented New York University. The team was independent of any conference but was a part of the National Collegiate Athletic Association. The team had 24 head coaches during its time of operations and had its first recorded football game in 1894. The final coach was Hugh Devore who first took the position for the 1950 season and concluded with the end of the 1952 season.

== Key ==
Key to symbols in coaches list
General		Overall		Conference		Postseason (Note: Although the first Rose Bowl Game was played in 1902, it has been continuously played since the 1916 game, and is recognized as the oldest bowl game by the NCAA. "—" indicates any season prior to 1916 when postseason games were not played.)	
No.	Order of coaches (Note: A running total of the number of head coaches, with coaches who served separate tenures being counted only once. Interim head coaches are represented with "Int" and are not counted in the running total. "—" indicates the team played but either without a coach or no coach is on record. "X" indicates an interim year without play.)	GC	Games coached	CW	Conference wins	PW	Postseason wins
DC	Division championships	OW	Overall wins	CL	Conference losses	PL	Postseason losses
CC	Conference championships	OL	Overall losses	CT	Conference ties	PT	Postseason ties
NC	National championships	OT	Overall ties (Note: Overtime rules in college football were introduced in 1996, making ties impossible in the period since.)	C%	Conference winning percentage		
†	Elected to the College Football Hall of Fame	O%	Overall winning percentage (Note: When computing the win–loss percentage, a tie counts as half a win and half a loss.)				

== Coaches ==
No.	Name	Term	GC	OW	OL	OT	O%	CW	CL	CT	C%	PW	PL	CCs	Awards
1	John A. Hartwell	1894	3	0	3	0	.000	—	—	—	—	—	—	—	—
2	Frank H. Cann	1898	4	1	3	0	.250	—	—	—	—	—	—	—	—
3	James Ogilvie	1899	8	2	6	0	.250	—	—	—	—	—	—	—	—
4	Nelson B. Hatch	1900	10	3	6	1	.350	—	—	—	—	—	—	—	—
5	W. H. Rorke	1901–1902	19	12	6	1	.658	—	—	—	—	—	—	—	—
6	Robert P. Wilson	1903	7	2	5	0	.286	—	—	—	—	—	—	—	—
7	Dave Fultz	1904	9	3	6	0	.333	—	—	—	—	—	—	—	—
8	Marshall Mills	1905	7	3	3	1	.500	—	—	—	—	—	—	—	—
9	Douglas Church	1906	4	0	4	0	.000	—	—	—	—	—	—	—	—
10	Herman Olcott	1907–1912	44	18	19	7	.489	—	—	—	—	—	—	—	—
11	Jake High	1913	8	0	8	0	.000	—	—	—	—	—	—	—	—
12	Thomas T. Reilley	1914–1915	18	9	7	2	.556	—	—	—	—	—	—	—	—
13	Richard E. Eustis	1916	8	4	3	1	.563	—	—	—	—	—	—	—	—
14	Francis P. Wall	1917	7	2	2	3	.500	—	—	—	—	—	—	—	—
15	Appleton A. Mason	1918	4	0	4	0	.000	—	—	—	—	—	—	—	—
16	John B. Longwell	1919	8	4	4	0	.500	—	—	—	—	—	—	—	—
17	Frank Gargan	1920–1921	16	4	8	4	.375	—	—	—	—	—	—	—	—
18	Tom Thorp	1922–1924	26	14	10	2	.577	—	—	—	—	—	—	—	—
19	Chick Meehan	1925–1931	68	49	15	4	.750	—	—	—	—	—	—	—	—
20	Howard Cann	1932–1933	15	7	7	1	.500	—	—	—	—	—	—	—	—
21	Mal Stevens	1934–1941	69	33	34	2	.493	—	—	—	—	—	—	—	—
22	John J. Weinheimer	1944–1946	22	10	12	0	.455	—	—	—	—	—	—	—	—
23	Edward Mylin	1947–1949	26	8	17	1	.327	—	—	—	—	—	—	—	—
24	Hugh Devore	1950–1952	23	4	17	2	.217	—	—	—	—	—	—	—	—
