= Coles Sports and Recreation Center =

Athletic facility at New York University

Coordinates: 40.72656°N 73.99749°W

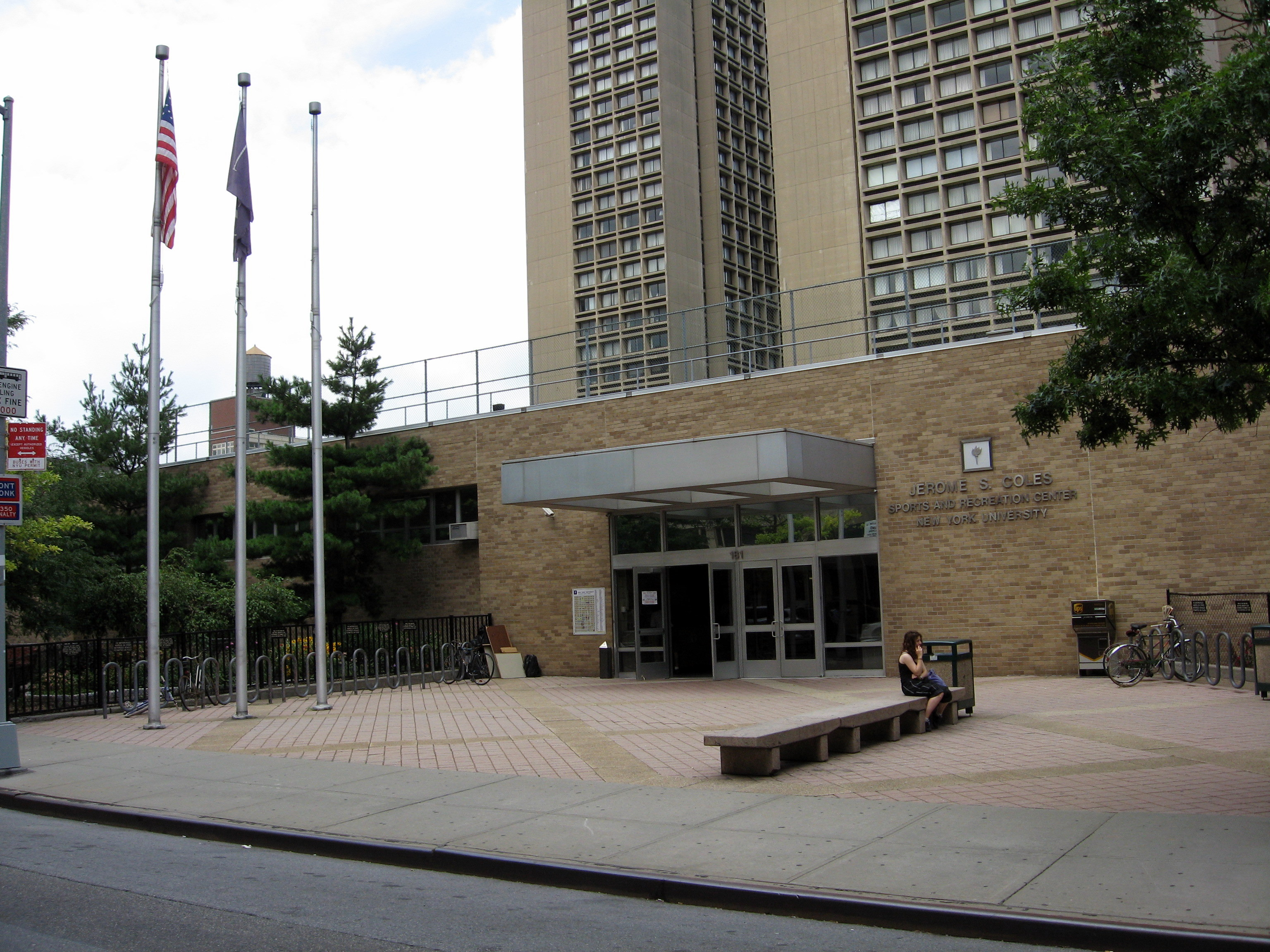
The entrance on Mercer Street.

The Jerome S. Coles Sports and Recreation Center was the main athletic facility at New York University, located at 181 Mercer Street in New York City, in the U.S. state of New York. The gymnasium was opened in September 1981. The building was named in honor of Jerome S. Coles, an alumnus and benefactor of NYU.

The facilities accommodated a wide range of individual and group recreational sports and fitness activities, including over 130 different courses at various skill levels serving 10,000 participants, as well as club sports and an intramural program enjoyed by approximately 3,500 students. Coles was renovated with a new dehumidification system in 1999 to solve problems of corrosion.

Up to 3,000 members used the facility daily, while 1,900 spectators could be seated in the fieldhouse bleachers and 230 could be seated in the natatorium bleachers. The Coles Sports Center was barrier-free and accessible to physically challenged persons.

Coles was also the home to most of New York University's NCAA Division III intercollegiate teams. Some teams that competed in the facility include: men's and women's basketball, diving, swimming, volleyball, and men's wrestling. The fencing team also used Coles facilities, but participated in NCAA Division I.

Club sports housed at Coles Sports and Recreation Center included badminton, cheerleading, martial arts, squash, racquetball, baseball, and waterpolo.

Coles was closed in February 2016, and demolished as part of the NYU 2031 plan, with the John B. Paulson Center opened on the site in 2023 to replace it.

== Tournament hosting ==
The center also has played host to the following events: NCAA Basketball National Championships, NCAA Regional Wrestling Championships, ECAC Regional Basketball Championships, Metropolitan Wrestling Championships, International Wrestling events, International Fencing events, University Athletic Association Championships and National Collegiate Tae Kwon Do Championships. In 1994–95, Coles hosted the Intercollegiate Fencing Association Championships and the UAA Wrestling Championship. In 1998, the UAA Women's Volleyball Round Robin took place at Coles, and the women's basketball team hosted the Sweet Sixteen and the Final Four during the NCAA Division III Women's Basketball Championships.

== Facilities ==
The following facilities were open to all students:

- A multi-purpose arena with five courts.
- Two batting cages.
- A roof with a 1/6 mile, three-lane running track plus six tennis courts.
- A natatorium with an NCAA-regulation 25-meter swimming pool, diving tank, and saunas.
- Five squash courts and five handball/racquetball courts.
- Weight training facilities.
- An aerobic fitness room.
- Individual rooms for wrestling/judo, fencing, physical fitness and calisthenics, exercise prescription, dance, and free play activities.
- Rock climbing wall.
