= NYU Violets =

Sports teams that represent New York University

New York University Violets
- University: New York University
- Nickname: Violets
- NCAA: Division III
- Conference: UAA
- Athletic director: Jake Olkkola
- Location: New York, New York
- Varsity teams: 23
- Basketball arena: John A. Paulson Center
- Baseball stadium: SIUH Community Park
- Soccer stadium: Home games usually played at Gaelic Park
- Colors: Purple and white
- Mascot: Bobcat
- Website: gonyuathletics.com
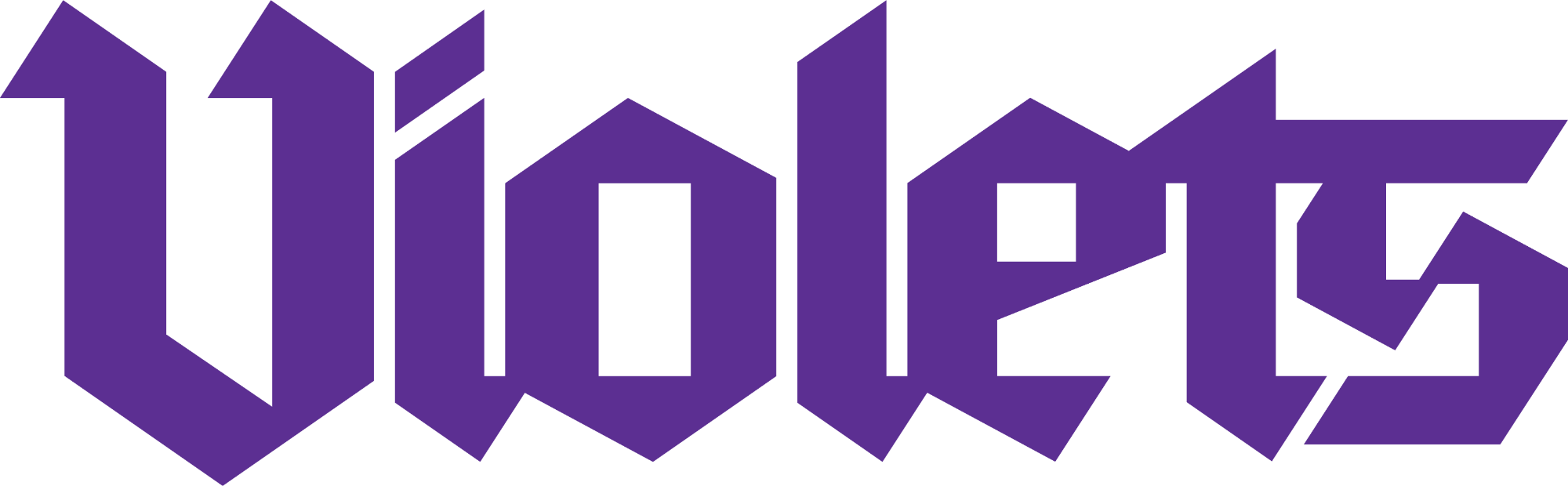

NYU Violets is the nickname of the sports teams and other competitive teams at New York University. The school colors are purple and white. Although officially known as the Violets, the school mascot is a bobcat. The Violets compete as a member of NCAA Division III in the University Athletic Association conference. The university sponsors 23 varsity sports, as well as club teams and intramural sports.

== Sports sponsored ==
Men's sports	Women's sports
Baseball	Basketball
Basketball	Cross Country
Cross Country	Fencing
Fencing	Golf
Golf	Soccer
Soccer	Softball
Swimming & Diving	Swimming & Diving
Tennis	Tennis
Track & Field†	Track & Field†
Volleyball	Volleyball
Wrestling	
† – Track and field includes both indoor and outdoor

== Nickname and mascot ==
For more than a century, NYU athletes have worn violet and white colors in competition, which is the root of the nickname Violets. In the 1980s, after briefly using a student dressed as a violet for a mascot, the school instead adopted the bobcat as its mascot, from the abbreviation then being used by NYU's Bobst Library computerized catalog.

== History ==
NYU long offered a full athletic program, and was in fact a pioneer in the area of intercollegiate sports. When NYU began playing college football in 1873 it was one of the first football teams established in the United States (following Princeton, Rutgers, Columbia and Yale). Additionally, the current governing body for collegiate sports, the NCAA, was formed as the direct result of a meeting convened in New York City by NYU Chancellor Henry MacCracken in December 1905 to improve the safety of football.

However, in a process somewhat similar to what occurred with NYU's current conference rival Chicago Maroons, athletics were gradually deemphasized at NYU over the passing decades. The school terminated its intercollegiate football program in 1953. In 1971 the basketball program was abruptly dropped. In 1981, at the urging of then president John Brademas, NYU removed its remaining sports from NCAA Division I to Division III. Still, NYU maintains a significant history of athletic success.

Intercollegiate sports at NYU also had moments of importance beyond anything shown by a scoreboard. In the 1940 season, before a football game between NYU and Missouri in Columbia, Missouri, 2,000 NYU students protested against the "gentlemen's agreement" to exclude African-American athletes (at the University of Missouri's request). At the time, it was the largest protest ever against this practice.

=== Division I ===
Since beginning play in 1873, NYU football has had many football players earn recognition for their achievements, most notably 1928 All-American and future Hall-of-Famer Ken Strong. The Violets played their games at Ohio Field, which still exists on NYU's former University Heights campus at Bronx Community College. The most successful football coach in NYU history was Chick Meehan, who coached the team to seven successful seasons from 1925 to 1931. In 1939, head coach Mal Stevens led NYU to a 5–1 start and the program's only appearance in the AP Poll, before fading to a 5–4 final record. Additionally, the model for the Heisman Trophy is based on 1930s NYU football star Ed Smith. Despite some shining moments, however, Time magazine characterized NYU's overall football history as mostly "lean" in 1942, and NYU permanently dropped the sport as a varsity program after the 1952 season.

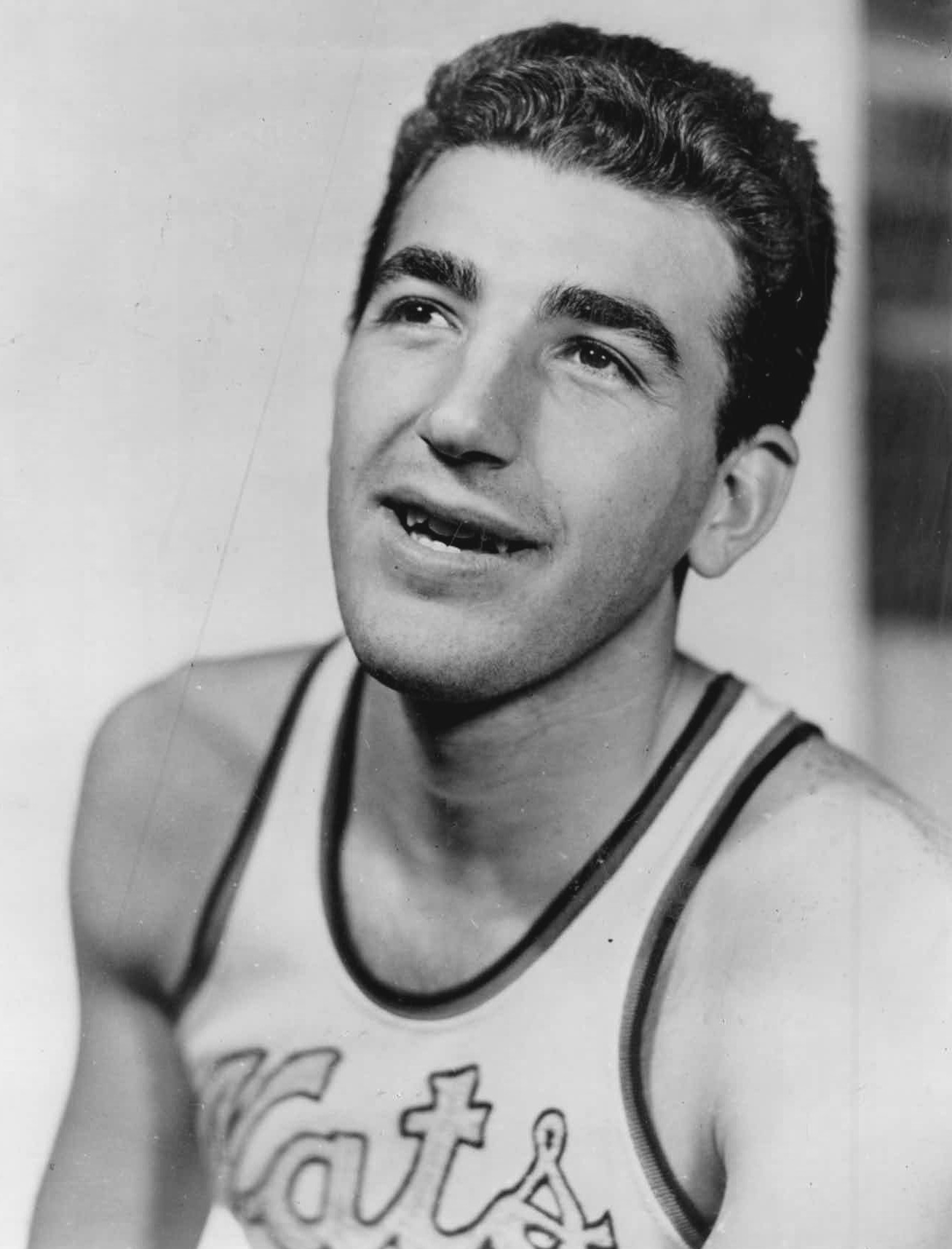
Dolph Schayes

While a member of Division I, the Violets' men's basketball program achieved far greater success than the school's football team. Its best NCAA tournament result was finishing as national runner-up to Oklahoma State (coached by the legendary Henry Iba) in the 1945 NCAA tournament, with future NBA Hall of Famer Dolph Schayes playing for NYU. NYU returned to the Final Four in 1960, losing to Ohio State, whose roster featured legends Jerry Lucas and John Havlicek. NYU was even more successful in the years before the advent of the NIT tournament (in 1938) or the NCAA tournament (in 1939). In 1920 NYU won the Amateur Athletic Union national championship tournament, led by the Helms Athletic Foundation Player of the Year, Howard Cann, and the 19–1 NYU team of 1935 was named (retrospectively) by the Helms Foundation and the Premo-Porretta Power Poll as the best team in the nation. The Violets' most recent post-season accomplishment as a Division I school was finishing as the runner-up to BYU in the 1966 National Invitation Tournament. Their six appearances in the NCAA basketball tournament are the second-most among teams no longer in Division I (after Oklahoma City University's 11), and their nine wins are the most among those teams.

NYU maintained a nationally ranked basketball team through the sixties with such stars as Barry Kramer and Satch Sanders going to the NBA. The Violets played most of their games in Madison Square Garden, most notably their duels with UCLA led by Kareem Abdul-Jabbar, but games against less exalted local opponents like Fordham were played in the field house on the NYU campus in University Heights.

==== Fencing ====
NYU continues to compete at the Division I level in fencing, and the program boasts 30 national championships. The university's men's fencing team won the most NCAA Division I championships or co-championships prior to the NCAA's establishment of coed team competition in 1990. NYU men won 12 NCAA titles between 1947 and 1976, plus an additional eight titles prior to NCAA sponsorship.

Gilbert Eisner, a future national champion, went undefeated in the three years of 1959, 1960, and 1961, and won the NCAA épée championship in 1960 while fencing for NYU. Also in 1960, future Olympian Eugene Glazer won the NCAA National Championship in foil. Singer Neil Diamond was a member of the 1960 NCAA men's championship team. Herb Cohen (class of 1962), a future Olympian, went undefeated in 1961 and won both the NCAA foil championship and the NCAA saber championship, and then in 1962 won his second straight NCAA Championship in foil, while being named national Fencer of the Year. In 1965, Howard Goodman was the NCAA saber champion. In 1967, future Olympian George Masin won the NCAA épée championship. Martin Lang, a future Olympic fencer, was 55-5 for the team, graduating in 1972. Risto Hurme, a future Olympian, won the NCAA épée championship in 1973, 1974, and 1975. In 1977, Olympian Hans Wieselgren won the NCAA épée championship.

The women's fencing team has been national champions ten times, winning the National Intercollegiate Women's Fencing Association (NIWFA) Mildred Stuyvesant-Fish Trophy from 1929 to 1933, in 1938, from 1949 to 1951, and in 1971 when coached by future Olympic coach Michel Sebastiani. NIWFA was co-founded by NYU freshmen Julia Jones and Dorothy Hafner in 1928.

=== Division III ===
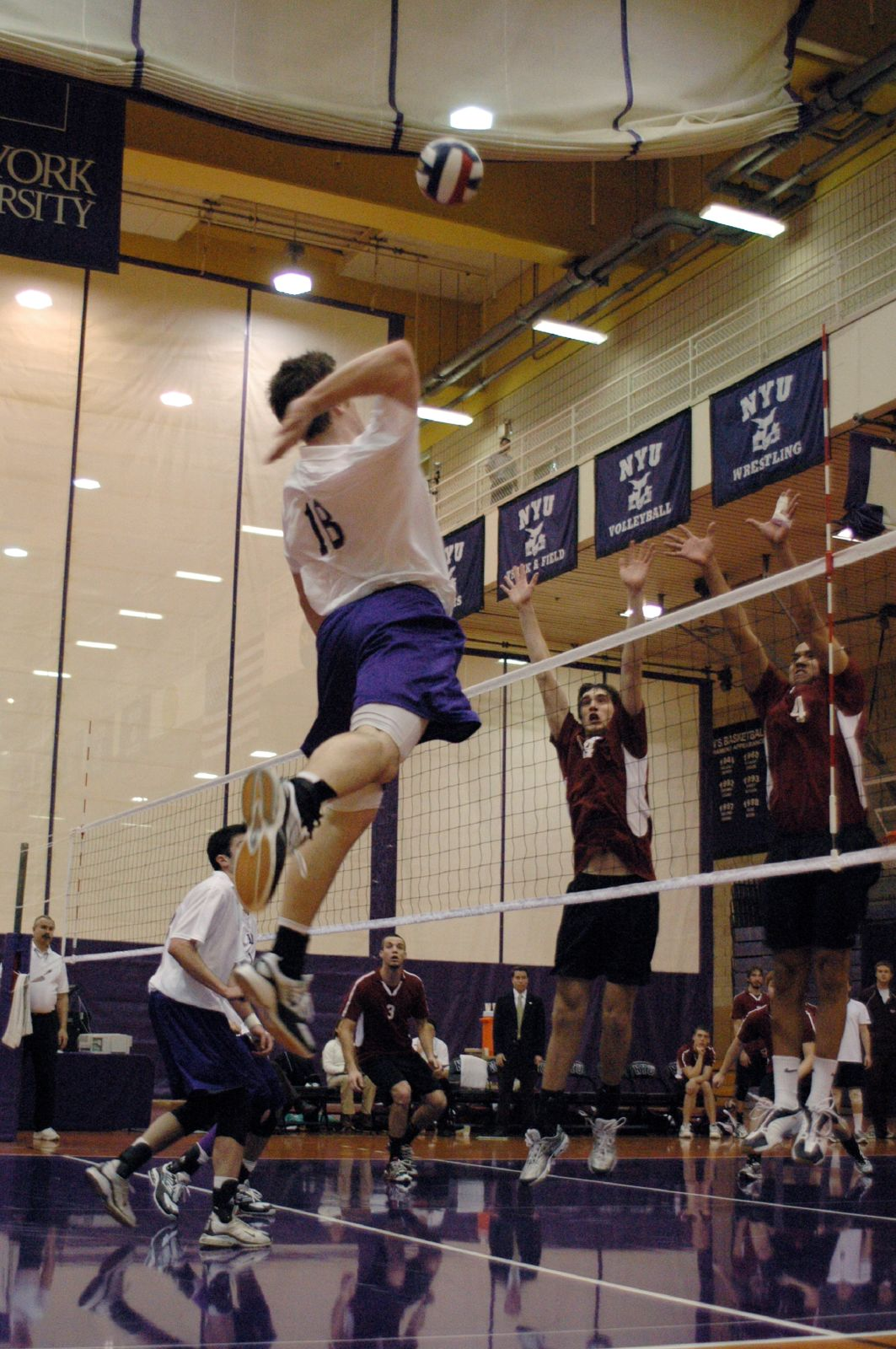
Men's volleyball match in the Coles Center

NYU, in its relatively short history in NCAA Division III, has won two national team championships (and many league championships).

==== Baseball and softball ====
NYU added varsity baseball and softball teams for the 2014–2015 school year. NYU had not sponsored varsity baseball since 1974, but it previously produced several major-league players, including Ralph Branca and Eddie Yost. Home games were played at Maimonides Park, home of the Minor League Brooklyn Cyclones, and are now played at SIUH Community Park, the home of the Staten Island FerryHawks professional baseball team of the Atlantic League of Professional Baseball. Softball was an entirely new varsity sport for NYU.

==== Basketball ====
NYU’s basketball program has enjoyed a good deal of success since being reinstated on the Division III level in 1983. In 1997, the women's basketball team, led by head coach Janice Quinn, won a championship title over the University of Wisconsin–Eau Claire and in 2007 returned to the Final Four. On February 8, 2026 the team set a new record for consecutive wins in Division III women's basketball with their 82nd such win, surpassing the previous record set by Washington University in St. Louis, which won 81 consecutive games from 1998-2001. NYU’s streak reached 91 consecutive wins, and then ended with a loss to Scranton on March 19, 2026.

NYU men's basketball and head coach Joe Nesci appeared in the Division III National Championship game in 1994.

==== Cross country ====
In 2007, the men's cross country team, led by head coach Nick McDonough, captured the NCAA Division III team championship at St. Olaf College in Northfield, Minnesota.

=== National championships ===
NYU has won five team Division III NCAA national championships:

- Women's basketball (1997, 2024, 2025)
- Men's cross country (2007)
- Women's golf (2019)

NYU athletes have won four individual NCAA Division III national championship:

- Nathan Pike Wrestling 133-Pound Class (2017)
- Honore Collins 200-yard IM (2017), 200-yard individual medley (2019), 400-yard individual medley (2019), and 200-yard butterfly (2019)

NYU had won 37 Division I national championships, prior to its move to Division III:

- Men's basketball (AAU, 1920)
- Men's fencing (1933, 1935–1938, 1940–942, 1947, 1954, 1957, 1960–1961, 1966–1967, 1970–1971, 1973–1974, 1976)
- Women's fencing (1929–1933, 1938, 1949–1951, 1971)
- Men's indoor track (1929, 1932, 1940, 1943, 1947–1948)

== Facilities ==
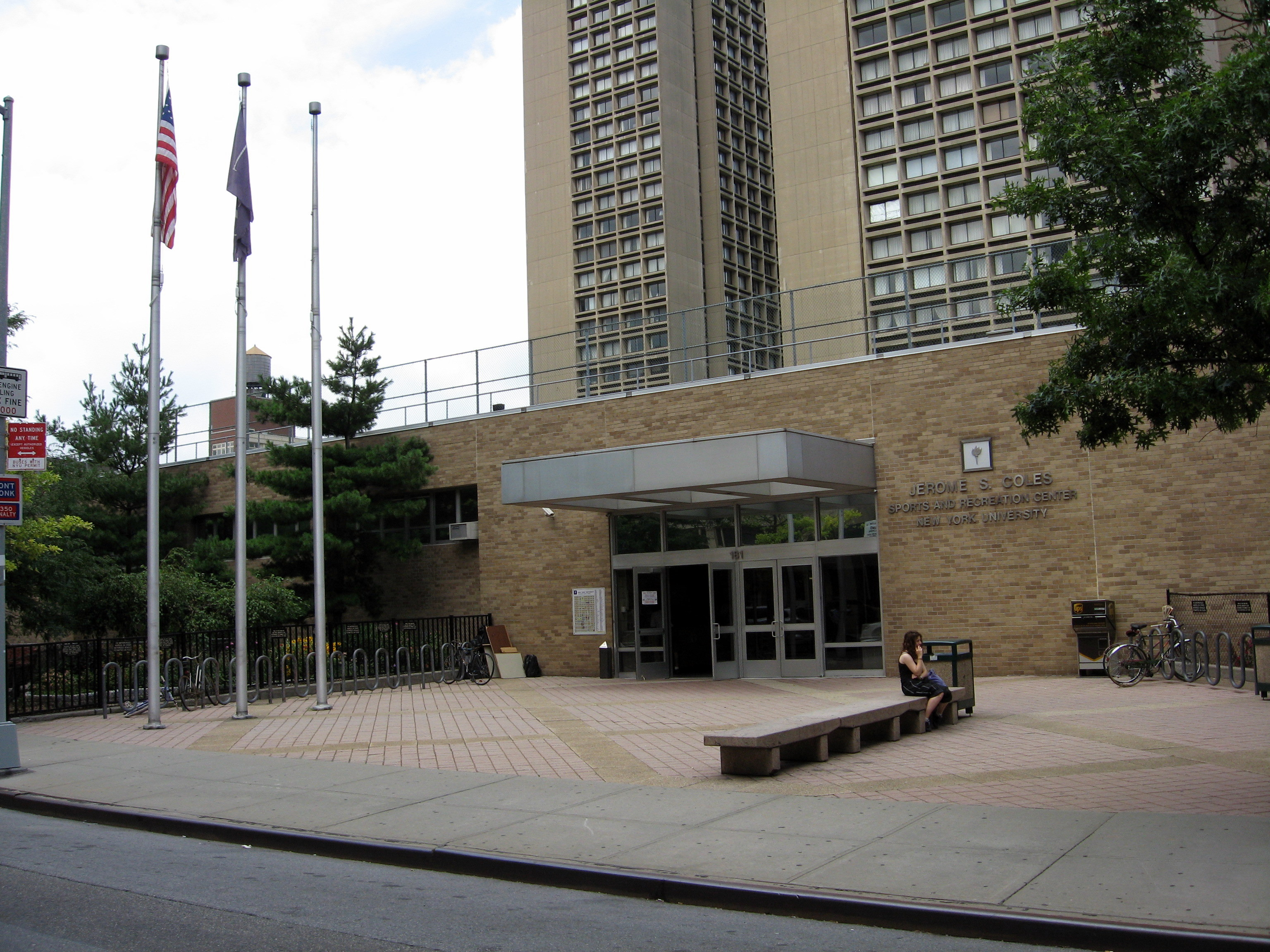
The Coles Center

The Coles Sports and Recreation Center served as the home base of several of NYU's intercollegiate athletic teams, including basketball, wrestling, and volleyball for over three decades starting in 1981. Coles was closed in February 2016 to make way for NYU's new $1 Billion mixed use development: the John A. Paulson Center, located at 181 Mercer. Unlike Coles, Mercer Street will host a combination of expanded athletic facilities, classroom and residential space.

Many of NYU's varsity teams sometimes play their games at various facilities and fields throughout Manhattan because of the scarcity of space for playing fields in that borough. The soccer teams play their home games at Van Cortlandt Park, and the track and field teams have their home meets at the New Balance Track and Field Center. The golf team does not have a home golf course in Manhattan, but they often practice at the Chelsea Piers Athletic Facility and at various country club courses that have a relationship with the team and university in New York City. The rowing team travels on a daily basis to their boathouse in New Jersey, roughly 10 miles from Washington Square. The tennis team practices and plays home matches at the Stadium Tennis Center, located in the Bronx.

In 2002, NYU opened the Palladium Athletic Facility as the second on-campus recreational facility. This facility's amenities include a rock-climbing wall, a natatorium with a 25-yard by 25-meter swimming pool, basketball courts, weight training, cardiovascular rooms, and a spinning room. Palladium, erected on the site of the famous New York nightclub bearing the same name, is home to the university's swimming and diving teams and water polo teams.

The baseball team plays its home games at SIUH Community Park, home of the Staten Island FerryHawks. The tennis team plays at the Stadium Tennis Center.

== Rivalries ==
NYU's rival, dictated by history and geography, has been Columbia University, though it also had a rivalry with Rutgers University, as shown by older fight song lyrics. Rutgers and NYU played 43 times in football from 1890 to 1952, with Rutgers having a 23-18-2 record against the Violets. Eleven of the final 14 NYU home games were played at either Yankee Stadium or the Polo Grounds. Rutgers also played NYU 46 times in basketball between 1906 and 1971, though unlike the football rivalry, NYU had a decided edge on Rutgers, winning all but ten of the contests, including 18 straight between 1928 and 1966. NYU's annual football game against Fordham University was known as the Manhattan Subway classic. Currently, NYU's biggest rivals are in the UAA (University Athletic Association), including teams such as Emory University in Atlanta and Washington University in St. Louis.

== Club teams ==
NYU students also compete in several "club" teams (which may or may not compete on an intercollegiate basis) including lacrosse, soccer, water polo, crew, squash, rugby union, table tennis, Quidditch, ice hockey, equestrian, TaeKwonDo, Kendo, ultimate, flag football, climbing, badminton, and Esports. NYU also offers intramural sport teams.

=== Ice hockey ===
NYU's ice hockey team has been one of its most successful athletic programs, winning 2 National Championships at the ACHA Division II level before making the move up to Division I ACHA in 2017. They currently compete in the Eastern States Collegiate Hockey League, a conference which includes opponents such as Syracuse, Rutgers, and the University of Delaware. Their head coach is Dustin Good.

=== Taekwondo ===
NYU's Taekwondo (TKD) team competes in the Eastern Collegiate Taekwondo Conference (ECTC) and in the National Collegiate Taekwondo Association (NCTA). Founded in 1987 by Master Lesly, the team has been a large presence in the Club Sports community at NYU. As of 2020, NYU Sport TKD placed first in the ECTC Division II. The coaches for the team include Grandmaster Mark Lesly, Master Erica Linthorst, and Master Andrew Park. The team has been part of the ECTC since 1990 and were represented in the first iteration of the now ECTC All-Star team.

=== Lacrosse ===
The first intercollegiate lacrosse game in the United States was played on November 22, 1877 between New York University and Manhattan College. On May 7, 1924, NYU overwhelmed and shutout Harvard at Soldier's Field by a score of 7-0. Men's lacrosse at NYU was discontinued sometime after 1931 but was revived nearly 60 years later in 1990. Under head coach Chris Schreiber (Hopkins '86), the team went undefeated in its inaugural season and won its first four games to start the 1991 season, including wins against Rider, Iona and Columbia. The team currently competes in the NY Metro Conference of the National College Lacrosse League. In 2010, NYU defeated Columbia twice in the span of 24 hours at the Beltway Bash Tournament at the University of Maryland. In 2015 NYU made an NCLL sweet 16 appearance before falling to Quinnipiac.

=== Crew (rowing) ===
NYU has hosted a crew team for over a century, tracing its beginnings back to 1902. While initially the team was exclusively male, the sport would eventually expand to be coed decades later. Today, the team performs water practices on the Passaic River in Lyndhurst, New Jersey; while using NYU's three athletic facilities for its dry land workouts. They travel to multiple regattas in the fall and spring, including the Head of the Charles and Dad Vails where NYU takes on varsity crews like Yale University, Columbia University, and the University of Pennsylvania.

=== Water polo ===
NYU Men's and Women's Water Polo Team compete in the New York Division of the Collegiate Water Polo Association, National Collegiate Club/Division III.

=== Reviving football at NYU ===
Unsuccessful attempts have been made at reviving NYU football at club level, both as an intramural activity and as an intercollegiate sport. From 1964 to 1966, NYU participated with Georgetown and Fordham in NYU's first attempt to play non-Division I football, reviving Georgetown football but not doing the same for NYU.

The sale of NYU's University Heights campus in 1973 hampered further attempts to create a football team, due to scant recreational space downtown. Nevertheless, as recently as 2003 several students created a football club but struggled to find extra funding to defray expenses, find supporters, or reliable participants for practices and games (held at the East River Park football fields at 6th and FDR).

As of 2025, club football has been revived as a sport at NYU and currently competes in competitions against other east coast college’s flag football teams.

== See also ==
- List of NYU Violets head football coaches
