= 2023 NCAA Division II women's basketball tournament =

- Teams: 64
- Finals site: ,;Elite 8/Final 4 St. Joseph Civic Arena, St. Joseph, Missouri Championship American Airlines Center, Dallas, Texas
- Champions: Ashland (3rd title)
- Runner-up: Minnesota-Duluth (1st title game)
- Semifinalists: Glenville State (3rd Final Four); Catawba (1st Final Four)
- Winning coach: Kari Pickens (1st title)
- MOP: Annie Roshak (Ashland)

The 2023 NCAA Division II women's basketball tournament is a single-elimination tournament to determine the national champion of women's NCAA Division II college basketball in the United States. The tournament featured 64 teams.

During the 2022–23 academic year, the NCAA organized many events to celebrate the 50th anniversary of the enactment of Title IX, federal legislation outlawing sex discrimination in higher education. As part of this celebration, the NCAA scheduled the women's basketball championship games of all three of its divisions at the site of the 2023 Division I Final Four. Accordingly, the championship game was held on April 1, 2023, at the American Airlines Center in Dallas. The national quarterfinals and semifinals were played at the St. Joseph Civic Arena in St. Joseph, Missouri.

This scheduling also created an unusually long break in the tournament. Normally, the national championship game is played one or two days after the semifinals, but this year's final took place 10 days after the semifinals.

== Tournament schedule and venues ==
2023 NCAA Division II Women's Tournament sites

=== Regionals ===
First, second, and third-round games (the latter of which doubles as a regional championship) were held at campus sites from March 10–13, 2023. The top-seeded team in each regional served as host.

=== Elite Eight ===
The national quarterfinals, semifinals, and finals were held at predetermined sites: the former two rounds were played at the St. Joseph Civic Arena in St. Joseph, Missouri and the latter at American Airlines Center in Dallas.

The national championship was played on April 1, 2023, in Dallas, concurrently with the 2023 NCAA Division I women's basketball tournament Final Four.

== Qualification ==
A total of 64 bids were available for the tournament: Twenty-three automatic bids (awarded to the champions of each Division II conference) and 41 at-large bids.

The bids are allocated evenly among the eight NCAA-designated regions (Atlantic, Central, East, Midwest, South, South Central, Southeast, and West), each of which contains either two or three of the twenty-three Division II conferences that sponsor men's basketball. Each region consists of two or three automatic qualifiers (the teams who won their respective conference tournaments) and either five or six at-large bids, awarded regardless of conference affiliation.

=== Automatic bids (23) ===
Automatic bids
Region (Bids)	Conference	School	Record (Conf.)	Appearance	Last bid
Atlantic (3)	CIAA	Elizabeth City State	20–10	2nd	2007
Atlantic (3)	MEC	Glenville State	29-2	16th	2022
Atlantic (3)	PSAC	California (PA)	21-10	19th	2022
Central (3)	GAC	Southern Nazarene	27-4	2nd	2021
Central (3)	MIAA	Missouri Southern	27-6	5th	2022
Central (3)	NSIC	Minnesota Duluth	27-3	15th	2022
East (3)	CACC	Dominican (NY)	21-10	3rd	2021
East (3)	ECC	Daemen	20-4	4th	2022
East (3)	NE-10	Bentley	21-9	37th	2022
Midwest (3)	GLIAC	Grand Valley State	29-2	17th	2022
Midwest (3)	GLVC	Drury	30-1	20th	2022
Midwest (3)	G-MAC	Ashland	31-0	13th	2022
South (3)	GSC	Union (TN)	26-3	8th	2022
South (3)	SIAC	Tuskegee	26-3	7th	2021
South (3)	SSC	Tampa	30-1	15th	2022
South Central (2)	LSC	Angelo State	25-6	14th	2020
South Central (2)	RMAC	Regis	25-6	7th	2017
Southeast (3)	CC	UNC Pembroke	22-9	1st	Never
Southeast (3)	PBC	Georgia Southwestern State	24-6	2nd	2022
Southeast (3)	SAC	Lenoir–Rhyne	24-7	5th	2014
West (3)	CCAA	Cal State San Marcos	23-5	3rd	2022
West (3)	GNAC	Western Washington	24-3	19th	2022
West (3)	PacWest	Azusa Pacific	25-4	7th	2022

=== At-large bids (41) ===
At-large bids
Region (Bids)	School	Conference	Record (Conf.)	Appearance	Last bid
Atlantic (5)	Charleston (WV)	MEC	23-8	11th	2022
Atlantic (5)	Gannon	PSAC	29-4	14th	2022
Atlantic (5)	Shippensburg	PSAC	24-6	10th	2017
Atlantic (5)	West Chester	PSAC	22-8	8th	2018
Atlantic (5)	West Virginia State	MEC	22-6	2nd	2004
Central (5)	Augustana (SD)	NSIC	25-5	15th	2018
Central (5)	Central Missouri	MIAA	25-4	25th	2021
Central (5)	Minnesota State-Mankato	NSIC	25-4	8th	2022
Central (5)	Nebraska–Kearney	MIAA	28-4	15th	2022
Central (5)	Pittsburg State	MIAA	22-7	12th	2019
East (5)	Assumption	NE-10	24-5	8th	2017
East (5)	Jefferson	CACC	26-4	14th	2022
East (5)	Le Moyne	NE-10	21-6	5th	2022
East (5)	Southern New Hampshire	NE-10	21-7	4th	2022
East (5)	St. Thomas Aquinas	ECC	21-8	3rd	2019
Midwest (5)	Kentucky Wesleyan	G-MAC	23-6	5th	2021
Midwest (5)	Lewis	GLVC	21-10	16th	2020
Midwest (5)	Malone	G-MAC	21-9	2nd	2017
Midwest (5)	Michigan Tech	GLIAC	25-6	21st	2021
Midwest (5)	Trevecca Nazarene	G-MAC	21-9	1st	Never
South (5)	Eckerd	SSC	24-5	7th	2022
South (5)	Lee	GSC	25-6	7th	2022
South (5)	Lynn	SSC	23-8	3rd	2013
South (5)	Nova Southeastern	SSC	21-8	7th	2019
South (5)	Valdosta State	GSC	22-6	15th	2022
South Central (6)	Black Hills State	RMAC	22-7	4th	2021
South Central (6)	Colorado Mines	RMAC	24-6	5th	2022
South Central (6)	Lubbock Christian	LSC	22-10	7th	2022
South Central (6)	Texas Woman's	LSC	26-5	4th	2022
South Central (6)	UT Tyler	LSC	24-7	1st	Never
South Central (6)	West Texas A&M	LSC	21-10	28th	2022
Southeast (5)	Catawba	SAC	25-5	8th	2022
Southeast (5)	Clayton State	PBC	18-11	15th	2020
Southeast (5)	North Georgia	PBC	19-10	7th	2022
Southeast (5)	South Carolina-Aiken	PBC	18-11	7th	2013
Southeast (5)	Wingate	SAC	22-7	20th	2022
West (5)	Cal State Dominguez Hills	CCAA	28-2	8th	2015
West (5)	Cal State LA	CCAA	20-9	3rd	2012
West (5)	Cal Poly Pomona	CCAA	18-10	28th	2020
West (5)	Central Washington	GNAC	21-8	5th	2022
West (5)	Montana State Billings	GNAC	24-7	15th	2018

== Bracket ==
=== Atlantic ===
- Site: Glenville, West Virginia (Glenville State)

First round March 10
1	Glenville State	84
8	Elizabeth City State	60
5	West Virginia State	83
4	Shippensburg	87
3	West Chester	80
6	California (PA)	67
7	Charleston (WV)	69
2	Gannon	65

Regional semifinals March 11
1	Glenville State	107
4	Shippensburg	76
3	West Chester	73
7	Charleston (WV)	60

Regional Finals; March 13
1	Glenville State	88
3	West Chester	63

* – Denotes overtime period

=== Central ===
- Site: Duluth, Minnesota (Minnesota-Duluth)

First round March 10
1	Minnesota-Duluth	66
8	Southern Nazarene	50
5	Minnesota State-Mankato	83
4	Central Missouri	81
3	Missouri Southern State	75
6	Augustana (SD)	74
7	Pittsburg State	74
2	Nebraska-Kearney	54

Regional semifinals March 11
1	Minnesota-Duluth	86
5	Minnesota State-Mankato	70
3	Missouri Southern State	73
7	Pittsburg State	64

Regional Finals; March 13
1	Minnesota-Duluth	77
3	Missouri Southern State	76

* – Denotes overtime period

=== East ===
- Site: Worcester, Massachusetts (Assumption)

First round March 10
1	Assumption	71
8	Dominican (NY)	49
5	Bentley	53
4	Le Moyne	39
3	Jefferson	74
6	Daemen	47
7	St. Thomas Aquinas	44
2	Southern New Hampshire	65

Regional semifinals March 11
1	Assumption	62
5	Bentley	47
3	Jefferson	62
2	Southern New Hampshire	49

Regional Finals; March 13
1	Assumption	62
3	Jefferson	57

* – Denotes overtime period

=== Midwest ===
- Site: Ashland, Ohio (Ashland)

First round March 10
1	Ashland	72
8	Malone	65
5	Trevecca Nazarene	65
4	Michigan Tech	63
3	Grand Valley State	81
6	Kentucky Wesleyan	77
7	Lewis	60
2	Drury	71

Regional semifinals March 11
1	Ashland	73
5	Trevecca Nazarene	49
3	Grand Valley State	61
2	Drury	53

Regional Finals; March 13
1	Ashland	61
3	Grand Valley State	58

* – Denotes overtime period

=== South ===
- Site: Tampa, Florida (Tampa)

First round March 10
1	Tampa	82
8	Tuskegee	64
5	Lynn	52
4	Lee	63
3	Union (TN)	58
6	Valdosta State	52
7	Nova Southeastern	73
2	Eckerd	79

Regional semifinals March 11
1	Tampa	73
5	Lee	51
3	Union (TN)	57
2	Eckerd	64

Regional Finals; March 13
1	Tampa	76
2	Eckerd	53

* – Denotes overtime period

=== South Central ===
- Site: San Angelo, Texas (Angelo State)

First round March 10
1	Angelo State	70
8	West Texas A&M	65
5	UT-Tyler	73
4	Colorado Mines	63
3	Regis	57
6	Black Hills State	61
7	Lubbock Christian	62
2	Texas Woman's	55

Regional semifinals March 11
1	Angelo State	61
5	UT-Tyler	71
6	Black Hills State	48
7	Lubbock Christian	66

Regional Finals; March 13
5	UT-Tyler	67
7	Lubbock Christian	64

* – Denotes overtime period

=== Southeast ===
- Site: Salisbury, North Carolina (Catawba)

First round March 10
1	Catawba	57
8	UNC-Pembroke	40
5	Clayton State	65
4	Lenoir-Rhyne	48
3	Georgia Southwestern State	92
6	South Carolina-Aiken	66
7	North Georgia	53
2	Wingate	72

Regional semifinals March 11
1	Catawba	75
5	Clayton State	49
3	Georgia Southwestern State	81
2	Wingate	64

Regional Finals; March 13
1	Catawba	75
3	Georgia Southwestern State	65

* – Denotes overtime period

=== West ===
- Site: Carson, California (Cal State Dominguez Hills)

First round
1	Cal State Dominguez Hills	87
8	Cal Poly Pomona	61
5	Cal State LA	66
4	Montana State Billings	69
3	Cal State San Marcos	86
6	Central Washington	74
7	Azusa Pacific	71
2	Western Washington	53

Regional semifinals
1	Cal State Dominguez Hills	77
4	Montana State Billings	66
3	Cal State San Marcos	75
7	Azusa Pacific	67

Regional Finals
1	Cal State Dominguez Hills	73
3	Cal State San Marcos	51

* – Denotes overtime period

=== Elite Eight ===
- Site: Elite 8 and Final 4-St. Joseph Civic Arena, St. Joseph, Missouri/National Championship Game-American Airlines Center, Dallas, Texas

Elite Eight; March 20, 2023
1	Ashland	81
8	UT-Tyler	72
4	Tampa	66
5	Glenville State	78
2	Minnesota-Duluth	61
7	Assumption	41
3	Cal State Dominguez Hills	70
6	Catawba	77

Final Four; March 22, 2023
1	Ashland	76
5	Glenville State	67
2	Minnesota-Duluth	70
6	Catawba	59

National championship April 1, 2023
1	Ashland	78
2	Minnesota-Duluth	67

== All-tournament team ==
- Annie Roshak, Ashland
- Zoe Miller, Ashland
- Hayley Smith, Ashland
- Hallie Heidemann, Ashland
- Brooke Olson, Minnesota-Duluth

== See also ==
- 2023 NCAA Division I women's basketball tournament
- 2023 NCAA Division III women's basketball tournament
- 2023 NAIA women's basketball tournament
- 2023 NCAA Division II men's basketball tournament
