= Lubbock Christian Chaparrals Women's Basketball =

College women's basketball team representing Lubbock Christian University

- University: Lubbock Christian University
- Head coach: Steve Gomez (22nd season)
- Location: Lubbock, Texas
- Arena: Rip Griffin Center (capacity: 1950)
- Conference: Lone Star Conference
- Nickname: Lady Chaps
- Colors: Blue and white
- All-time record: Overall: 848-500 (.629); NCAA Division II: 339–69 (.838); NAIA: 509-431 (.541)

NCAA Division I tournament champions
- 2016, 2019, 2021
Other NCAA Division I tournament results
Final Four	2016, 2019, 2021
Elite Eight	2016, 2018, 2019, 2021, 2025
Sweet Sixteen	2016, 2018, 2019, 2021, 2022, 2023, 2025
Appearances	2016, 2018, 2019, 2020, 2021, 2022, 2023, 2024, 2025, 2026

Conference tournament champions
- 2016, 2020, 2021

Conference regular-season champions
- 2014*, 2015*, 2018, 2019, 2021; Won conference in probationary year (2014, 2015)

The Lady Chaparrals basketball team represents Lubbock Christian University and competes in the Lone Star Conference of NCAA Division II

== History ==
The Lady Chaparrals first season was in 1979-1980.

One of the Chaps first coaches was Larry Hays who coached in 1982-83 season going 8-9. During his one season coaching, he also coached the baseball team.

=== NAIA Success (2003-2013) ===
Steve Gomez took over as head coach of the Lubbock Christian University (LCU) Lady Chaps basketball program in the 2003-04 season. Under his leadership, the team quickly became a dominant force in the NAIA, making 10 consecutive appearances in the NAIA Division I Women’s Basketball National Championship Tournament.

During their NAIA tenure, the Lady Chaps compiled an impressive 234-96 record under Gomez. Notable seasons include the 2005-06 campaign, where they made an unprecedented run to the Fab Four of the NAIA National Tournament as the lowest-seeded team to reach that stage. They secured their first Sooner Athletic Conference (SAC) regular-season championship in 2006-07 and repeated the feat in 2011-12, finishing as conference co-champions. LCU reached the NAIA National Championship Semifinals twice, in 2011-12 and 2012-13, with both runs ending against the eventual national champions.

=== Transition to NCAA Division II (2013-Present) ===
LCU began transitioning to NCAA Division II in 2013, officially joining in 2015. The Lady Chaps continued their winning tradition, going 25-1 in their first year of transition (2013-14), including a perfect 20-0 record in the Heartland Conference. They followed up with a 21-7 record in 2014-15, sharing the Heartland Conference regular-season title.

The 2015-16 season was historic, as LCU went undefeated (35-0) in their first season eligible for NCAA postseason play. They captured the Heartland Conference regular season and tournament titles, won the South Central Regional, and claimed their first NCAA Division II National Championship. Coach Gomez was named WBCA NCAA Division II National Coach of the Year and served as a court coach for USA Basketball’s U17 World Championship Team Trials.

Sustained Success and National Titles

Despite a rebuilding year in 2016-17, LCU still reached the Heartland Conference Tournament final. They rebounded in 2017-18, winning another conference championship and advancing to the NCAA Elite Eight, finishing with a 31-2 record. The following year (2018-19), they secured their second NCAA Division II National Championship with a thrilling double-overtime win over Southwestern Oklahoma State.

The COVID-19 pandemic disrupted LCU’s 2019-20 season. They won the Lone Star Conference in their first year in the league and were set to host the South Central Regionals before the season was canceled. In 2020-21, the Lady Chaps overcame challenges to complete a second perfect season (23-0) and win their third NCAA Division II National Championship, making them the first program in the division to achieve multiple undefeated seasons.

Recent Years (2021-Present)

The Lady Chaps continued to be a powerhouse, surpassing an NCAA Division II record of 100 consecutive home wins during the 2021-22 season. They finished the year with a 28-7 record, falling in the South Central Regional final. The 2022-23 season featured five new starters and ended with a 24-11 record and a co-divisional title, further cementing LCU’s dominance at the NCAA level.

== Roster ==
2024–25 Lubbock Christian Chaparrals women's basketball team
Players
Coaches

Pos.	#	Name	Height	Year	Previous school	Hometown
F	0	Grace Foster	6 ft 1 in (1.85 m)	Sr	Childress H.S.	Childress, TX
G	1	Kennedy Chappell	5 ft 9 in (1.75 m)	So	Dallas Christian School	Heath, TX
G	2	Maci Maddox	5 ft 7 in (1.7 m)	GS	Frenship H.S.	Lubbock, TX
G	3	Audrey Robertson	5 ft 8 in (1.73 m)	GS	Tivy H.S.	Kerrville, TX
G	5	Kimber Mathews	5 ft 9 in (1.75 m)	So	Gruver H.S.	Gruver, TX
G	11	Taylor Allen	5 ft 9 in (1.75 m)	So	Highland H.S.	Roscoe, TX
G	12	Taylor Thomas	5 ft 9 in (1.75 m)	Jr	Canyon H.S.	Canyon, TX
G	15	Maddie Moyers	5 ft 10 in (1.78 m)	Fr	Roosevelt H.S.	Longmont, CO
F	22	Rylee Verduin	6 ft 2 in (1.88 m)	Fr	Homeschool	Wylie, TX
F	23	Martie McCoy	5 ft 11 in (1.8 m)	Jr	Muenster H.S.	Muenster, TX
F	30	Audrey Spurgin	6 ft 2 in (1.88 m)	Sr	Fredericksburg H.S.	Fredericksburg, TX
F	31	Tia johnson	5 ft 9 in (1.75 m)	Jr	Brownfield H.S.	Lubbock, TX
F	33	Deja Johnson	5 ft 9 in (1.75 m)	Jr	Brownfield H.S.	Lubbock, TX
C	40	Reese Schumann	6 ft 1 in (1.85 m)	Sr	Clear Lake H.S.	Houston, TX

Head coach

- Steve Gomez (Lubbock Christian University)

Assistant coach(es)

- Kaycie Wilson (Lubbock Christian University)
- Landon Gomez (Lubbock Christian University)
- Julio Pacheco (Federal University of Santa Catarina)

Legend

- (C) Team captain
- (S) Suspended
- (I) Ineligible
- (W) Walk-on
- Injured
- Current redshirt

Roster
Last update: March 10, 2025

== Individual Awards ==
=== All Conference Awards ===
Player	Team	Other Awards
Nicole Hampton	1st Team (2014, 2016)	2016 Player of the Year (Heartland Conference)
Emily Pool	2nd Team (2014)	
Haley Burton	1st Team (2015)	
Kellyn Schneider	2nd Team (2015)	2015 Defensive Player of the Year 2016 Defensive Player of the Year
Tess Bruffey	1st Team (2016, 2017, 2018)	2015 Freshman of the Year (Heartland Conference) 2017 Player of the Year (Heartland Conference) 2018 Player of the Year (Heartland Conference) 2018 Defender of the Year (Heartland Conference)
Kelsey Hoppel	2nd Team (2016)	
Maddi Chitsey	2nd Team (2018)	
Caitlyn Cunyus	2nd Team (2018, 2020)	
Maddi Chitsey	1st Team (2020)	2020 Player of the Year (Lone Star Conference) 2020 Defensive Player of the Year (Lone Star Conference)
Allie Schulte	1st Team (2021, 2022) 2nd Team (2020)	
Ashton Duncan	2nd Team (2021)	
Emma Middleton	2nd Team (2021)	
Maci Maddox	1st Team (2025) 2nd Team (2023, 2024)	
Grace Foster	1st Team (2023, 2024, 2025)	2025 Player of the Year (Lone Star Conference)
Audrey Robertson	2nd Team (2024, 2025)	

== Seasons ==
Season	Overall	Conference	Standing	Postseason
2006-2007	26-7	0-0		
2007-2008	25-10	0-0		
2008-2009	27-7	0-0		
2009-2010	19-13	0-0		
2010-2011	23-9-1	0-0		
2011-2012	28-6	0-0		
2012-2013	31-4	0-0		
2013-2014	25-1	20-0	1st	Not eligible for postseason play
2014-2015	21-7	15-3	1st	Not eligible for postseason play
2015-2016	35-0	18-0	1st	NCAA Division II Champions
2016-2017	19-11	12-4		
2017-2018	31-2	14-0	1st	NCAA Division II Elite Eight
2018-2019	32-5	13-1	1st	NCAA Division II Champions
2019-2020	28-3	19-3	2nd	Lone Star Conference Tournament Champions NCAA Division II Tournament *
2020-2021	23-0	13-0	1st	Lone Star Conference Champions NCAA Division II Champions
2021-2022	28-7	12-4	4th	NCAA Division II Sweet 16
2022-2023	24-11	16-6	2nd West Division	NCAA Division II Sweet 16
2023-2024	21-10	16-6	1st West Division	NCAA Tournament
2024-2025	32-5	21-1	1st West Division	NCAA Division II Elite 8

== NCAA tournament results ==
The Lady Chaps have appeared in 9 NCAA Tournaments, with a record of 25-4 and 3 National Titles

Year	Seed	Round	Opponent	Result
2016	#1	First Round Second Round; Sweet 16; Elite 8 Final 4 Finals	#8 Texas Womans #4 Angelo State #3 West Texas A&M #4 Florida Southern #1 Bentley #2 Alaska-Anchorage	W 95-75 W 101-72; W 88-68; W 73-69; W 67-67; W 78-73
2018	#1	First Round Second Round; Sweet 16; Elite 8	#8 Tarleton State #4 Angelo State #2 West Texas A&M #2 Central Missouri	W 78-46 W 61-59; W 56-53; L 72-62
2019	#3	First Round Second Round; Sweet 16; Elite 8 Final 4 Finals	#6 Tarleton State #2 Colorado Mesa #4 Angelo Stat #2 North Georgia #1 Drury #2 Southwestern Oklahoma	W 64-53 W 56-53; W 76-70; W 99-54; W 69-60; W 95-85
2020	#1	First Round	#8 Angelo State	Cancelled
2021	#1	Second Round Sweet 16; Elite 8 Final 4 Final	#5 Cameron #2 SW Oklahoma #8 Daemen #5 Central Missouri #3 Drury	W 96-66 W 78-65; W 66-49; W 63-61; W 69-59
2022	#3	First Round Second Round; Sweet 16	#6 CSU Pueblo #2 Texas A&M - Commerce #1 West Texas A&M	W 65-57 W 69-67; L 59-54
2023	#7	First Round Second Round; Sweet 16	#2 Texas Woman's University #6 Black Hills State #5 UT- Tyler	W 62-55 W 66-48; L 67-64
2024	#7	First Round	#2 Colorado Mesa	L 68-61
2025	#2	First Round Second Round; Sweet 16	#7 UC Colorado # 6 West Texas A&M # 6 Pittsburg St	W 68-65 W 62-54; L 66-55
