= Ryan McCarthy (basketball) =

American basketball coach & player

Current position
- Title: Head coach
- Team: Fresno State
- Conference: Pac-12
- Record: 15–18 (.455)

Biographical details
- Education: Northwest Nazarene (2006)

Playing career
- 2002–2006: Northwest Nazarene
- 2006: Central Oregon Hotshots
- 2006–2007: TuS Bramsche

Coaching career (HC unless noted)
- 2007–2010: Northwest Nazarene (asst.)
- 2010–2011: Northwest Nazarene (acting HC)
- 2011–2012: Northwest Nazarene (assoc. HC)
- 2012–2025: Alaska Anchorage
- 2025–present: Fresno State

Head coaching record
- Overall: 15–18 (.455) (NCAA D-I); 323–80 (.801) (NCAA D-II)

Accomplishments and honors

Awards
- 7× GNAC Coach of the Year

Ryan McCarthy is an American basketball coach and former player, who is the current head coach of the Fresno State Bulldogs women's basketball team. Prior to Fresno State, McCarthy spent 13-years as head coach of the Alaska Anchorage Seawolves women's basketball team, where he compiled a 309–67 (.822) record.

== Early life and playing career ==
McCarthy grew up in Anchorage, Alaska and attended Alaska Anchorage Seawolves basketball games in his youth. After graduating from high school, McCarthy attended Northwest Nazarene University (NNU), graduating in 2006 with a bachelor's degree in social science education. While at NNU, McCarthy was a four-year starter on the Nighthawks men's basketball team.

After graduating, McCarthy played professional basketball briefly for the Central Oregon Hotshots of the International Basketball League and TuS Bramsche in Germany.

== Coaching career ==
On April 14, 2025, McCarthy was hired as the 12th head coach in Fresno State Bulldogs program history.

== Head coaching record ==
Record table
Season	Team	Overall	Conference	Standing	Postseason
Northwest Nazarene (GNAC) (2010–2011)
2010–11	Northwest Nazarene	14–13	9–9	T-6th	
Northwest Nazarene:		14–13 (.519)	9–9 (.500)		
Alaska Anchorage (GNAC) (2012–2025)
2012–13	Alaska Anchorage	17–10	11–7	T-3rd	
2013–14	Alaska Anchorage	19–9	12–6	T-3rd	NCAA Division II First Round
2014–15	Alaska Anchorage	29–3	17–1	1st	NCAA Division II First Round
2015–16	Alaska Anchorage	38–3	18–2	1st	NCAA Division II runner-up
2016–17	Alaska Anchorage	30–2	20–0	1st	NCAA Division II Second Round
2017–18	Alaska Anchorage	27–5	18–2	T-1st	NCAA Division II Sweet Sixteen
2018–19	Alaska Anchorage	30–3	19–1	1st	NCAA Division II Sweet Sixteen
2019–20	Alaska Anchorage	31–2	19–1	1st	NCAA Tournament cancelled due to the COVID-19 pandemic.
2020–21	Alaska Anchorage	3–0	0–0	N/A	Season cancelled due to the COVID-19 pandemic.
2021–22	Alaska Anchorage	20–7	12–4	2nd	NCAA Division II First Round
2022–23	Alaska Anchorage	18–10	10–8	4th	
2023–24	Alaska Anchorage	19–9	13–5	3rd	
2024–25	Alaska Anchorage	28–5	16–2	1st	NCAA Division II Second Round
Alaska Anchorage:		309–67 (.822)	185–39 (.826)		
Fresno State (Mountain West) (2025–2026)
2025–26	Fresno State	15–18	8–12	7th	
Fresno State:		15–18 (.455)	8–12 (.400)		
Total:		338–98 (.775)			
National champion Postseason invitational champion Conference regular season champion Conference regular season and conference tournament champion Division regular season champion Division regular season and conference tournament champion Conference tournament champion
