= Kim Caldwell =

American women's basketball coach (born 1988)

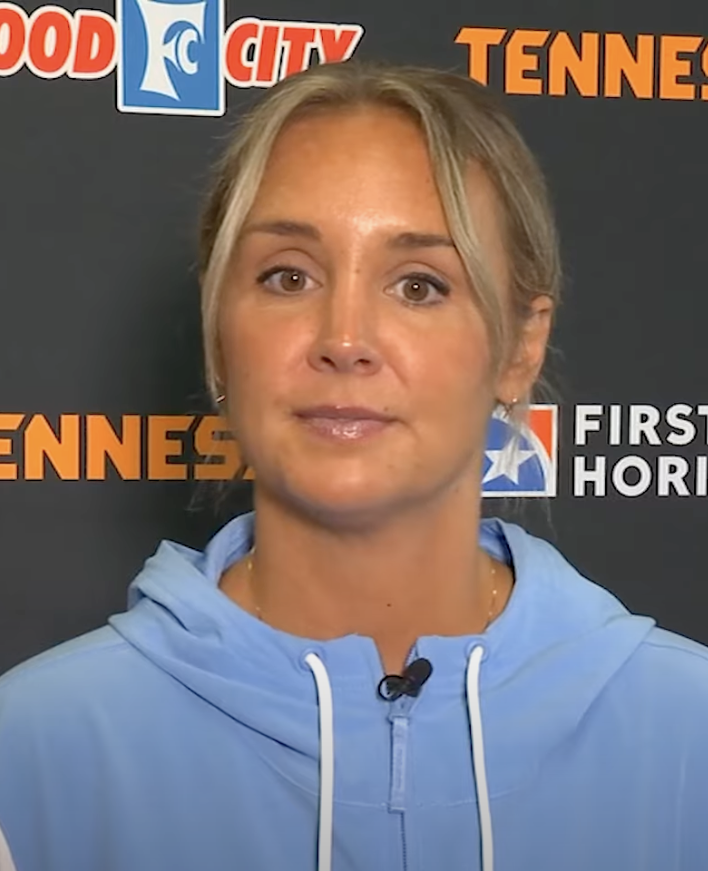
- Caldwell in 2024

Current position
- Title: Head coach
- Team: Tennessee
- Conference: SEC
- Record: 40–24 (.625)
- Annual salary: $750,000

Biographical details
- Born: November 24, 1988 (age 37); Parkersburg, West Virginia, U.S.

Playing career
- 2007–2011: Glenville State

Coaching career (HC unless noted)
- 2011–2013: Ohio Valley (assistant)
- 2013–2016: Sacramento State (assistant)
- 2016–2023: Glenville State
- 2023–2024: Marshall
- 2024–present: Tennessee

Head coaching record
- Overall: 257–55 (.824)
- Tournaments: 2–3 (NCAA Division I); 12–5 (NCAA Division II)

Accomplishments and honors

Championships
- NCAA Division II Tournament (2022); 2 NCAA Regional—Final Four (2022, 2023); 4 MEC tournament (2018, 2019, 2020, 2023); 6 MEC regular season (2017, 2018, 2019, 2020, 2022, 2023); SBC regular season (2024); SBC tournament (2024)

Awards
- WBCA Division II National Coach of the Year (2022); 4× MEC Coach of the Year (2018, 2019, 2022, 2023); SBC Coach of the Year (2024); Maggie Dixon Award (2024)

Kim Caldwell (née Stephens; born November 24, 1988) is an American college basketball coach who is currently the head coach of the University of Tennessee Lady Volunteers. She previously served in the same role at Marshall for one season, where she was named the Sun Belt Conference (SBC) Coach of the Year and received the Maggie Dixon Award as the top Division I rookie head coach in 2024. Prior to Marshall, Caldwell made a name for herself as coach of the Glenville State Pioneers. During her seven-year tenure there, the team won six regular season conference championships, four conference tournament championships, made six NCAA Division II Tournament appearances, and won the 2022 NCAA Division II National Championship.

== Playing career ==
Caldwell played high school basketball at Parkersburg South High School under her father, Scott Stephens. As a collegiate player at Glenville State, Caldwell was named team captain of the Pioneers in 2010–11 on a team that won a WVIAC conference championship and earned a berth to the NCAA Tournament. In 2011, she earned WVIAC Student-Athlete of the Year honors. She majored in sport management with a minor in psychology.

=== Glenville State statistics ===
Legend
| GP | Games played | GS | Games started | MPG | Minutes per game |
| FG% | Field goal percentage | 3P% | 3-point field goal percentage | FT% | Free throw percentage |
| RPG | Rebounds per game | APG | Assists per game | SPG | Steals per game |
| BPG | Blocks per game | PPG | Points per game | **Bold** | Career high |

| Year | Team | GP | Points | FG% | 3P% | FT% | RPG | APG | SPG | BPG | PPG |
|---|---|---|---|---|---|---|---|---|---|---|---|
| 2007–08 | Glenville State | 28 | 109 | **45.2%** | **66.7%** | 65.0% | 2.8 | 0.7 | 0.6 | 0.1 | 3.9 |
| 2008–09 | Glenville State | 28 | 163 | 41.6% | 25.0% | **80.5%** | **3.3** | **1.0** | 0.6 | **0.4** | 5.8 |
| 2009–10 | Glenville State | **33** | 155 | 31.8% | 27.0% | 77.8% | 2.4 | 0.9 | 0.6 | 0.1 | 5.5 |
| 2010–11 | Glenville State | **33** | **247** | 35.1% | 35.1% | 33.3% | 2.7 | 0.6 | **0.7** | - | **7.5** |
| Career | | 117 | 674 | 37.3% | 31.9% | 67.0% | 2.8 | 0.8 | 0.6 | 0.1 | 5.8 |

== Coaching career ==
=== Glenville State ===
In 2016, Caldwell was hired as head women's basketball coach at her alma mater, Glenville State, after serving as an assistant at Sacramento State and a graduate assistant at Ohio Valley. In 2022, she led the Pioneers to the NCAA Division II tournament championship.

=== Marshall ===
On March 27, 2023, Caldwell was named head coach at Marshall. During her first and ultimately only season at Marshall, she led the Thundering Herd to their first NCAA Division I tournament since 1997 after defeating James Madison in the Sun Belt tournament championship. Given her performance at Marshall, Caldwell was named by SBC head coaches as the league's 2024 coach of the year and by the Women's Basketball Coaches Association as the 2024 recipient of the Maggie Dixon Award as the top first-year head coach in Division I women's basketball.

=== Tennessee ===
On April 7, 2024, after one season at Marshall, Caldwell was named the head coach at Tennessee, becoming the first non-Tennessee alum to lead the program since Pat Summitt (a UT Martin graduate). In the 2024–25 season, she led the Lady Vols to a 24–10 record and a Sweet 16 berth. Their season ended with a 67–59 loss to Texas. In her second season, the Lady Vols finished with a 16–14 record. Their season ended with a 76–61 first round loss to NC State in the NCAA Tournament.

== Head coaching record ==
Record table
| Season | Team | Overall | Conference | Standing | Postseason |
|---|---|---|---|---|---|
Glenville State Pioneers (Mountain East Conference) (2016–2022)
| 2016–17 | Glenville State | 24–6 | 18–4 | 1st | NCAA Division II First Round |
| 2017–18 | Glenville State | 31–2 | 22–0 | 1st | NCAA Division II Second Round |
| 2018–19 | Glenville State | 30–3 | 21–1 | 1st | NCAA Division II Second Round |
| 2019–20 | Glenville State | 26–5 | 19–3 | 1st | NCAA Division II (Cancelled) |
| 2020–21 | Glenville State | 12–4 | 10–2 | 2nd | NCAA Division II First Round |
| 2021–22 | Glenville State | 35–1 | 22–0 | 1st | NCAA Division II Champions |
| 2022–23 | Glenville State | 33–3 | 20–2 | 1st | NCAA Division II Final Four |
| Glenville State: | | 191–24 (.888) | 132–12 (.917) | | |
Marshall Thundering Herd (Sun Belt Conference) (2023–2024)
| 2023–24 | Marshall | 26–7 | 17–1 | 1st | NCAA Division I First Round |
| Marshall: | | 26–7 (.788) | 17–1 (.944) | | |
Tennessee Lady Vols (Southeastern Conference) (2024–present)
| 2024–25 | Tennessee | 24–10 | 8–8 | T–8th | NCAA Division I Sweet Sixteen |
| 2025–26 | Tennessee | 16–14 | 8–8 | T–6th | NCAA Division I First Round |
| Tennessee: | | 40–24 (.625) | 16–16 (.500) | | |
| Total: | | 257–55 (.824) | | | |
National champion Postseason invitational champion Conference regular season champion Conference regular season and conference tournament champion Division regular season champion Division regular season and conference tournament champion Conference tournament champion

== Personal life ==
Kim Stephens was born on November 24, 1988, in Parkersburg, West Virginia. In May 2023, she married Justin Caldwell, who became the player development coordinator for the Tennessee Volunteers basketball team, following her hiring as the Lady Volunteers basketball coach. In September 2024, she announced her pregnancy. Their son, Conor Scott Caldwell, was born on January 20, 2025, amidst the Lady Volunteers SEC schedule.

== Honors ==
=== Team ===
Glenville State University

- Mountain East Conference regular season champion: 2017, 2018, 2019, 2021, 2022, 2023
- Mountain East Conference tournament champions: 2018, 2019, 2020, 2023
- NCAA Division II Champions: 2022

Marshall University

- Sun Belt Conference regular season champion: 2024
- Sun Belt Conference tournament champions: 2024

=== Individual ===
- Pat Summitt Trophy (WBCA NCAA Division II National Coach of the Year): 2021–22
- Maggie Dixon Award (WBCA rookie coach of the year in NCAA Division I): 2023–24
- Mountain East Conference Coach of the Year: 2017–18, 2018–19, 2021–22, 2022–23
- Sun Belt Conference Coach of the Year: 2023–24
- Furfari Award (West Virginia's College Coach of the Year): 2019, 2022
- WBCA Coaches Thirty Under 30: 2016–17
