= 2022 NCAA Division II women's basketball tournament =

- Teams: 64
- Finals site: Birmingham CrossPlex, Birmingham, Alabama
- Champions: Glenville State (1st title)
- Runner-up: Western Washington (1st title game)
- Semifinalists: North Georgia (1st Final Four); Grand Valley State (3rd Final Four)
- Winning coach: Kim Stephens (1st title)
- MOP: Re'Shawna Stone (Glenville State)

The 2022 NCAA Division II women's basketball tournament was the single-elimination tournament to determine the national champion of women's NCAA Division II college basketball in the United States.

The championship rounds were held March 21–25, 2022, at the Birmingham CrossPlex in Birmingham, Alabama. Glenville State won its first title by defeating Western Washington, 85–72.

The tournament returned to its pre-COVID-19 pandemic field of sixty-four teams.

== Tournament schedule and venues ==
2022 NCAA Division II Women's Tournament sites

=== Regionals ===
First, second, and third-round games, which comprise each regional championship, will take place on campus sites on March 11, 12, and 14. The top-seeded team in each regional serves as host.

These eight locations were chosen to host regional games for the 2022 tournament:

- Atlantic: Waco Center, Glenville State University, Glenville, West Virginia
- Central: Gross Memorial Coliseum, Fort Hays State University, Hays, Kansas
- East: Stan Spirou Field House, Southern New Hampshire University, Manchester, New Hampshire
- Midwest: Kates Gymnasium, Ashland University, Ashland, Ohio
- South: Fred DeLay Gymnasium, Union University, Jackson, Tennessee
- South Central: First United Bank Center, West Texas A&M University, Canyon, Texas
- Southeast: UNG Convocation Center, University of North Georgia, Dahlonega, Georgia
- West: Pioneer Gym, California State University, East Bay, Hayward, California

=== Elite Eight ===
The national quarterfinals, semifinals, and finals were held on March 21, 23, and 25 at a pre-determined site, the Birmingham CrossPlex in Birmingham, Alabama.

== Qualification ==
A total of sixty-four bids are available for the tournament: 23 automatic bids (awarded to the champions of the twenty-one Division II conferences) and 41 at-large bids.

The bids are allocated evenly among the eight NCAA-designated regions (Atlantic, Central, East, Midwest, South, South Central, Southeast, and West), each of which contains either two or three of the twenty-three Division II conferences that sponsor men's basketball (after the Heartland Conference disbanded in 2019, the South Region now features only two conferences). Each region consists of two or three automatic qualifiers (the teams who won their respective conference tournaments) and either five or six at-large bids, awarded regardless of conference affiliation.

=== Automatic bids (23) ===
Automatic bids
| Region (Bids) | Conference | School | Record (Conf.) | Appearance | Last bid |
|---|---|---|---|---|---|
| Atlantic (3) | CIAA | Lincoln (PA) | 22–7 | 1st | Never |
| Atlantic (3) | Mountain East | Charleston | 21–8 | 10th | 2014 |
| Atlantic (3) | PSAC | Gannon | 24–6 | 13th | 2020 |
| Central (3) | Great American | SW Oklahoma State | 29–4 | 7th | 2021 |
| Central (3) | MIAA | Fort Hays State | 28–3 | 8th | 2021 |
| Central (3) | Northern Sun | Minnesota–Duluth | 24–4 | 14th | 2021 |
| East (3) | CACC | U Sciences | 23–4 | 7th | 2020 |
| East (3) | East Coast | Daemen | 20–4 | 3rd | 2021 |
| East (3) | Northeast-10 | Bentley | 19–8 | 36th | 2019 |
| Midwest (3) | GLIAC | Ferris State | 22–9 | 6th | 2020 |
| Midwest (3) | GLVC | Drury | 31–4 | 19th | 2021 |
| Midwest (3) | G-MAC | Ashland | 28–2 | 12th | 2021 |
| South (3) | Gulf South | Union (TN) | 26–2 | 7th | 2021 |
| South (3) | SIAC | Benedict | 23–7 | 9th | 2020 |
| South (3) | Sunshine State | Tampa | 29–5 | 14th | 2020 |
| South Central (2) | Lone Star | West Texas A&M | 23–10 | 27th | 2020 |
| South Central (2) | RMAC | Metro State | 22–8 | 9th | 2018 |
| Southeast (3) | Carolinas | Barton | 28–1 | 10th | 2021 |
| Southeast (3) | Peach Belt | North Georgia | 25–3 | 6th | 2021 |
| Southeast (3) | South Atlantic | Carson–Newman | 26–5 | 12th | 2021 |
| West (3) | CCAA | Cal State East Bay | 22–2 | 4th | 2017 |
| West (3) | GNAC | Central Washington | 23–7 | 4th | 2003 |
| West (3) | PacWest | Azusa Pacific | 24–3 | 6th | 2021 |

=== At-large bids (41) ===
At-large bids
| Region (Bids) | School | Conference | Record (Conf.) | Appearance | Last bid |
|---|---|---|---|---|---|
| Atlantic (5) | California (PA) | PSAC | 24–5 | 18th | 2020 |
| Atlantic (5) | Glenville State | Mountain East | 29–1 | 15th | 2021 |
| Atlantic (5) | Indiana (PA) | PSAC | 21–8 | 15th | 2020 |
| Atlantic (5) | Kutztown | PSAC | 26–6 | 2nd | 1996 |
| Atlantic (5) | Shepherd | PSAC | 24–7 | 3rd | 2015 |
| Central (5) | Minnesota State | NSIC | 21–6 | 7th | 2015 |
| Central (5) | Missouri Southern | MIAA | 24–6 | 4th | 1996 |
| Central (5) | Missouri Western | MIAA | 21–9 | 13th | 2016 |
| Central (5) | Nebraska–Kearney | MIAA | 23–7 | 14th | 2021 |
| Central (5) | St. Cloud State | NSIC | 23–4 | 14th | 2021 |
| East (5) | Chestnut Hill | CACC | 24–6 | 1st | Never |
| East (5) | Jefferson | CACC | 23–8 | 13th | 2020 |
| East (5) | Le Moyne | NE-10 | 17–7 | 4th | 2020 |
| East (5) | Pace | NE-10 | 21–7 | 17th | 2012 |
| East (5) | Southern New Hampshire | NE-10 | 21–6 | 3rd | 1990 |
| Midwest (5) | Grand Valley State | GLIAC | 27–2 | 17th | 2021 |
| Midwest (5) | UMSL | GLVC | 23–5 | 3rd | 2014 |
| Midwest (5) | Southern Indiana | GLVC | 23–5 | 12th | 2020 |
| Midwest (5) | Walsh | G-MAC | 26–4 | 4th | 2021 |
| Midwest (5) | Wayne State | GLIAC | 18–9 | 5th | 2015 |
| South (5) | Eckerd | Sunshine State | 20–4 | 6th | 2020 |
| South (5) | Florida Southern | Sunshine State | 20–9 | 16th | 2020 |
| South (5) | Lee (TN) | Gulf South | 24–7 | 5th | 2021 |
| South (5) | Savannah State | SIAC | 27–2 | 2nd | 1995 |
| South (5) | Valdosta State | Gulf South | 23–5 | 14th | 2021 |
| South Central (6) | Colorado Mesa | RMAC | 23–6 | 7th | 2020 |
| South Central (6) | Colorado Mines | RMAC | 25–5 | 4th | 2021 |
| South Central (6) | CSU Pueblo | RMAC | 23–8 | 11th | 2018 |
| South Central (6) | Lubbock Christian | Lone Star | 26–6 | 6th | 2021 |
| South Central (6) | Texas A&M–Commerce | Lone Star | 26–4 | 5th | 2021 |
| South Central (6) | Texas Woman's | Lone Star | 19–8 | 3rd | 2016 |
| Southeast (5) | Catawba | SAC | 23–6 | 7th | 2021 |
| Southeast (5) | Columbus State | Peach Belt | 17–11 | 12th | 2018 |
| Southeast (5) | Georgia Southwestern | Peach Belt | 22–6 | 1st | Never |
| Southeast (5) | Lander | Peach Belt | 22–4 | 16th | 2021 |
| Southeast (5) | Wingate | SAC | 24–5 | 19th | 2019 |
| West (5) | Academy of Art | PacWest | 18–10 | 4th | 2016 |
| West (5) | Alaska Anchorage | GNAC | 20–6 | 19th | 2020 |
| West (5) | Cal State San Marcos | CCAA | 22–3 | 2nd | 2020 |
| West (5) | Northwest Nazarene | GNAC | 18–9 | 9th | 2020 |
| West (5) | Western Washington | GNAC | 20–5 | 18th | 2020 |

== Regionals ==
=== Atlantic Regional ===
- Site: Glenville, West Virginia (Glenville State)

First round March 11
1 | Glenville State | 88
8 | Lincoln (PA) | 60
5 | Shepherd | 93**
4 | Gannon | 89
3 | Kutztown | 68
6 | Charleston (WV) | 78
7 | Indiana (PA) | 51
2 | California (PA) | 52

Regional semifinals March 12
1 | Glenville State | 82
5 | Shepherd | 70
6 | Charleston (WV) | 52
2 | California (PA) | 34

Regional finals March 14
1 | Glenville State | 89
6 | Charleston (WV) | 58

* – Denotes overtime period

=== Central Regional ===
- Site: Hays, Kansas (Fort Hays State)

First round March 11
1 | Fort Hays State | 66
8 | Minnesota State | 61
5 | St. Cloud State | 69*
4 | Missouri Southern | 67
3 | Minnesota–Duluth | 70
6 | Nebraska–Kearney | 77
7 | Missouri Western | 111
2 | SW Oklahoma State | 77

Regional semifinals March 12
1 | Fort Hays State | 59
5 | St. Cloud State | 55
6 | Nebraska-Kearney | 59
7 | Missouri Western | 72

Regional finals March 14
1 | Fort Hays State | 69
7 | Missouri Western | 70

* – Denotes overtime period

=== East Regional ===
- Site: Manchester, New Hampshire (Southern New Hampshire)

First round March 11
1 | SNHU | 59
8 | Daemen | 70
5 | Bentley | 47
4 | Jefferson | 50
3 | USciences | 64
6 | Le Moyne | 38
7 | Pace | 59
2 | Chestnut Hill | 53

Regional semifinals March 12
8 | Daemen | 70
4 | Jefferson | 52
3 | USciences | 60
7 | Pace | 65

Regional finals March 14
8 | Daemen | 65
7 | Pace | 67

=== Midwest Regional ===
- Site: Ashland, Ohio (Ashland)

First round March 11
1 | Ashland | 76
8 | Ferris State | 73
5 | Southern Indiana | 63
4 | Walsh | 75
3 | Drury | 65
6 | UMSL | 49
7 | Wayne State (MI) | 46
2 | Grand Valley State | 72

Regional semifinals March 12
1 | Ashland | 62
4 | Walsh | 72
3 | Drury | 69
2 | Grand Valley State | 74

Regional finals March 14
4 | Walsh | 61
2 | Grand Valley State | 64

=== South Regional ===
- Site: Jackson, Tennessee (Union (TN))

First round March 11
1 | Union (TN) | 87
8 | Savannah State | 56
5 | Eckerd | 69
4 | Florida Southern | 64
3 | Lee | 87
6 | Benedict | 77
7 | Valdosta State | 59
2 | Tampa | 50

Regional semifinals March 12
1 | Union | 73
5 | Eckerd | 48
3 | Lee | 44
7 | Valdosta State | 70

Regional finals March 14
1 | Union (TN) | 58
7 | Valdosta State | 66

=== South Central Regional ===
- Site: Canyon, Texas (West Texas A&M)

First round March 11
1 | West Texas A&M | 70
8 | Colorado Mesa | 64
5 | Metro State | 83
4 | Texas Woman's | 90*
3 | Lubbock Christian | 65
6 | CSU Pueblo | 57
7 | Colorado Mines | 74
2 | Texas A&M–Commerce | 80

Regional semifinals March 12
1 | West Texas A&M | 78
4 | Texas Woman's | 73
3 | Lubbock Christian | 69
2 | Texas A&M-Commerce | 67

Regional finals March 14
1 | West Texas A&M | 59
3 | Lubbock Christian | 54

* – Denotes overtime period

=== Southeast Regional ===
- Site: Dahlonega, Georgia (North Georgia)

First round March 11
1 | North Georgia | 63
8 | Columbus State | 42
5 | Carson-Newman | 81
4 | Wingate | 65
3 | Georgia Southwestern | 59
6 | Barton | 55
7 | Catawba | 68
2 | Lander | 80

Regional semifinals March 12
1 | North Georgia | 78
5 | Carson-Newman | 64
3 | Georgia Southwestern | 62
2 | Lander | 65

Regional finals March 14
1 | North Georgia | 59
2 | Lander | 57

=== West Regional ===
- Site: Hayward, California (Cal State East Bay)

First round March 11
1 | Cal State East Bay | 67
8 | Academy of Art | 49
5 | Azusa Pacific | 89*
4 | Cal State San Marcos | 86
3 | Western Washington | 76
6 | Alaska Anchorage | 64
7 | Northwest Nazarene | 74
2 | Central Washington | 79*

Regional semifinals March 12
1 | Cal State East Bay | 82
5 | Azusa Pacific | 74
3 | Western Washington | 64
2 | Central Washington | 58

Regional finals March 14
1 | Cal State East Bay | 59
3 | Western Washington | 73

* – Denotes overtime period

== Elite Eight - Birmingham, Alabama ==
Location: Birmingham CrossPlex

Elite Eight; March 21, 2022
1 | North Georgia | 68
8 | Pace | 61
4 | Valdosta State | 55
5 | Western Washington | 58
2 | Grand Valley State | 67
7 | Missouri Western | 44
3 | Glenville State | 103
6 | West Texas A&M | 56

Final Four; March 23, 2022
1 | North Georgia | 68
5 | Western Washington | 74
2 | Grand Valley State | 53
3 | Glenville State | 77

National championship March 25, 2022
5 | Western Washington | 72
3 | Glenville State | 85

== All-tournament team ==
- Re'Shawna Stone, Glenville State
- Zakiyah Winfield, Glenville State
- Dazha Congleton, Glenville State
- Emma Duff, Western Washington
- Brooke Walling, Western Washington

== See also ==
- 2022 NCAA Division I women's basketball tournament
- 2022 NCAA Division III women's basketball tournament
- 2022 NAIA women's basketball tournament
- 2022 NCAA Division II men's basketball tournament
