= Central Missouri Jennies basketball =

- University: University of Central Missouri
- First season: 1971
- All-time record: 958–398 (.706)
- Head coach: Dave Slifer (14th season)
- Conference: Mid-America Intercollegiate Athletics Association
- Location: Warrensburg, Missouri
- Arena: UCM Multipurpose Building (capacity: 6,500)
- Nickname: Jennies
- Colors: Cardinal and black

Uniforms
| Home | Away |

NCAA tournament champions
- 1984, 2018
Other NCAA tournament results
| Final Four | 1983, 1984, 1985, 1989, 2018, 2021 |
| Elite Eight | 1983, 1984, 1985, 1986, 1989, 1990, 2018, 2021 |
| Sweet Sixteen | 1983, 1984, 1985, 1986, 1987, 1988, 1989, 1990, 2018, 2021 |

AIAW tournament Sweet Sixteen
- 1982

AIAW tournament appearances
- 1980, 1982

Conference tournament champions
- 1983, 1984, 1985, 1986, 1988, 1989, 1990

Conference regular-season champions
- 1983, 1984, 1985, 1986, 1988, 1989, 1990, 1991, 1996, 2014, 2018

The Central Missouri Jennies basketball team represents the University of Central Missouri in Warrensburg, Missouri, in the NCAA Division II women's basketball competition. The team is currently coached by Dave Slifer. The Jennies compete in the Mid-America Intercollegiate Athletics Association (MIAA). The team plays its home games in the Multipurpose Building on campus.

== Season-by-season results ==
Statistics overview
| Season | Coach | Overall | Conference | Standing | Postseason |
|---|---|---|---|---|---|
Jane Markert (Mid-America Intercollegiate Athletics Association) (1970–1971)
| 1970–71 | Jane Markert | 11–4 | | | |
| Jane Markert: | | 11–4 (.733) | | | |
Mildred Barnes (Mid-America Intercollegiate Athletics Association) (1971–1980)
| 1971–72 | Mildred Barnes | 16–3 | | | |
| 1972–73 | Mildred Barnes | 17–6 | | | |
| 1973–74 | Mildred Barnes | 13–7 | | | |
| 1974–75 | Mildred Barnes | 13–8 | | | |
| 1975–76 | Mildred Barnes | 15–8 | | | |
| 1976–77 | Mildred Barnes | 23–6 | | | |
| 1977–78 | Mildred Barnes | 17–10 | | | |
| 1978–79 | Mildred Barnes | 16–10 | | | |
| 1979–80 | Mildred Barnes | 26–5 | | | AIAW Opening Round |
| Mildred Barnes: | | 156–63 (.712) | | | |
Jorja Hoehn (Mid-America Intercollegiate Athletics Association) (1980–1985)
| 1980–81 | Jorja Hoehn | 14–13 | | | |
| 1981–82 | Jorja Hoehn | 20–9 | | | AIAW Sweet Sixteen |
| 1982–83 | Jorja Hoehn | 29–3 | 12–0 | 1st | NCAA final Four |
| 1983–84 | Jorja Hoehn | 27–5 | 10–2 | 1st | NCAA Champions |
| 1984–85 | Jorja Hoehn | 28–4 | 12–0 | 1st | NCAA Runner–Up |
| Jorja Hoehn: | | 118–34 (.776) | | | |
Jon Pye (Mid-America Intercollegiate Athletics Association) (1985–1995)
| 1985–86 | Jon Pye | 23–6 | 11–1 | 1st | NCAA Elite Eight |
| 1986–87 | Jon Pye | 23–7 | 12–2 | 2nd | NCAA Sweet Sixteen |
| 1987–88 | Jon Pye | 27–5 | 13–1 | 1st | NCAA Sweet Sixteen |
| 1988–89 | Jon Pye | 29–5 | 14–0 | 1st | NCAA final Four |
| 1989–90 | Jon Pye | 29–3 | 14–2 | 1st | NCAA Elite Eight |
| 1990–91 | Jon Pye | 23–6 | 15–1 | 1st | NCAA round of 32 |
| 1991–92 | Jon Pye | 21–7 | 11–5 | 4th | |
| 1992–93 | Jon Pye | 19–10 | 10–6 | 4th | NCAA round of 32 |
| 1993–94 | Jon Pye | 18–9 | 11–5 | 4th | |
| 1994–95 | Jon Pye | 17–10 | 8–8 | 7th | |
| Jon Pye: | | 228–68 (.770) | | | |
Scott Ballard (Mid-America Intercollegiate Athletics Association) (1995–2004)
| 1995–96 | Scott Ballard | 23–5 | 12–4 | 1st | |
| 1996–97 | Scott Ballard | 21–9 | 13–5 | 2nd | NCAA Opening Round |
| 1997–98 | Scott Ballard | 19–10 | 9–7 | 5th | NCAA round of 32 |
| 1998–99 | Scott Ballard | 17–11 | 9–7 | 6th | |
| 1999–2000 | Scott Ballard | 22–7 | 14–4 | 2nd | NCAA Opening Round |
| 2000–01 | Scott Ballard | 19–9 | 11–7 | 4th | |
| 2001–02 | Scott Ballard | 21–9 | 12–6 | 3rd | |
| 2002–03 | Scott Ballard | 10–17 | 5–13 | 9th | |
| 2003–04 | Scott Ballard | 15–13 | 8–10 | 6th | |
| Scott Ballard: | | 167–90 (.650) | | | |
Dave Slifer (Mid-America Intercollegiate Athletics Association) (2004–present)
| 2004–05 | Dave Slifer | 23–8 | 13–5 | 3rd | NCAA Opening Round |
| 2005–06 | Dave Slifer | 22–10 | 11–5 | 3rd | NCAA round of 32 |
| 2006–07 | Dave Slifer | 14–14 | 7–11 | 5th | |
| 2007–08 | Dave Slifer | 14–14 | 9–9 | 4th | |
| 2008–09 | Dave Slifer | 17–11 | 12–8 | 4th | |
| 2009–10 | Dave Slifer | 19–12 | 13–7 | 3rd | NCAA Opening Round |
| 2010–11 | Dave Slifer | 16–13 | 12–10 | 6th | |
| 2011–12 | Dave Slifer | 20–9 | 13–7 | 4th | NCAA Opening Round |
| 2012–13 | Dave Slifer | 24–6 | 14–4 | 2nd | NCAA Opening Round |
| 2013–14 | Dave Slifer | 26–5 | 17–2 | 1st | NCAA round of 32 |
| 2014–15 | Dave Slifer | 21–9 | 13–6 | 5th | |
| 2015–16 | Dave Slifer | 11–18 | 9–13 | 10th | |
| 2016–17 | Dave Slifer | 24–7 | 15–4 | 2nd | NCAA round of 32 |
| 2017–18 | Dave Slifer | 30–3 | 18–1 | 1st | NCAA Champions |
| 2018–19 | Dave Slifer | 25-6 | 15-4 | 2nd | NCAA round of 32 |
| 2019–20 | Dave Slifer | 27-4 | 18-1 | 1st | Canceled |
| 2020–21 | Dave Slifer | 23-4 | 19-3 | 2nd | NCAA final Four |
| Dave Slifer: | | 356–153 (.699) | | | |
| Total: | | 1036–412 (.715) | | | |
National champion Postseason invitational champion Conference regular season champion Conference regular season and conference tournament champion Division regular season champion Division regular season and conference tournament champion Conference tournament champion
