= East Texas A&M Lions basketball =

The East Texas A&M Lions basketball program consists of:

- East Texas A&M Lions men's basketball
- East Texas A&M Lions women's basketball
