= 2019 NCAA Division II women's basketball tournament =

American women's college basketball event

- Teams: 64
- Finals site: , Alumni Hall; Columbus, Ohio
- Champions: Lubbock Christian (2nd title)
- Runner-up: Southwestern Oklahoma State (1st title game)
- Semifinalists: Drury (2nd Final Four); Indiana (PA) (3rd Final Four)
- Winning coach: Steve Gomez (2nd title)

The 2019 NCAA Division II women's basketball tournament involved 64 teams playing in a single-elimination tournament to determine the NCAA Division II women's college basketball national champion. It began on March 15, 2019, and concluded with the championship game on March 29, 2019.

The first three rounds were hosted by top-seeded teams in regional play. The eight regional winners met for the quarterfinal and semifinals, better known as the "Elite Eight" and "Final Four" respectively, and National Championship game at Alumni Hall in Columbus, Ohio. In the title game, Lubbock Christian defeated Southwestern Oklahoma State in double overtime to win their second Division II championship.

== Bracket ==
=== Atlantic Regional ===
- Site: Glenville, West Virginia (Glenville State)

Regional Quarterfinals; Round of 64; March 15
1	Glenville State	116
8	West Liberty	92
4	California (PA)	82
5	Charleston (WV)	71
2	Virginia Union	83
7	Edinboro	71
3	Indiana (PA)	87
6	Bowie State	60

Regional semifinals Round of 32; March 16
1	Glenville State	77
4	California (PA)	87*
2	Virginia Union	58
3	Indiana (PA)	66

Regional finals Sweet Sixteen; March 18
4	California (PA)	60
3	Indiana (PA)	68

* – Denotes overtime period

=== Central Regional ===
- Site: Hays, Kansas (Fort Hays State)

Regional Quarterfinals; Round of 64; March 15
1	Fort Hays State	74
8	Pittsburg State	65
4	Minnesota Duluth	54
5	Minnesota State–Moorhead	83
2	Southwestern Oklahoma	71
7	Emporia State	65
3	Central Missouri	76
6	Lindenwood	64

Regional semifinals Round of 32; March 16
1	Fort Hays State	71
5	Minnesota State–Moorhead	60
2	Southwestern Oklahoma	75
3	Central Missouri	72

Regional finals Sweet Sixteen; March 18
1	Fort Hays State	77
2	Southwestern Oklahoma	88

=== East Regional ===
- Site: Philadelphia, Pennsylvania (USciences)

Regional Quarterfinals; Round of 64; March 15
1	University of the Sciences	46
8	NYIT	41
4	Le Moyne	55
5	St. Thomas Aquinas	43
2	Bentley	40
7	Saint Anselm	59
3	Jefferson	77
6	Stonehill	86

Regional semifinals Round of 32; March 16
1	University of the Sciences	56
4	Le Moyne	63
7	Saint Anselm	59
6	Stonehill	50

Regional finals Sweet Sixteen; March 18
4	Le Moyne	61
7	Saint Anselm	63

=== Midwest Regional ===
- Site: O'Reilly Family Event Center, Springfield, Missouri (Drury)

Regional Quarterfinals; Round of 64; March 15
1	Drury	88
8	Kentucky Wesleyan	57
4	Ashland	57
5	Northern Michigan	64
2	Lewis	86
7	Walsh	71
3	Grand Valley State	89
6	Truman	64

Regional semifinals Round of 32; March 16
1	Drury	78
5	Northern Michigan	56
2	Lewis	55
3	Grand Valley State	72

Regional finals Sweet Sixteen; March 18
1	Drury	51
3	Grand Valley State	44

=== South Regional ===
- Site: Lakeland, Florida (Florida Southern)

Regional Quarterfinals; Round of 64; March 15
1	Florida Southern	89
8	Lane	57
4	Lee	63
5	Tampa	72
2	Union (TN)	66
7	Nova Southeastern	71
3	West Florida	78
6	Eckerd	50

Regional semifinals Round of 32; March 16
1	Florida Southern	76
5	Tampa	65
7	Nova Southeastern	87
3	West Florida	78

Regional finals Sweet Sixteen; March 18
1	Florida Southern	63
7	Nova Southeastern	84

=== Southeast Regional ===
- Site: Anderson, South Carolina (Anderson (SC))

Regional Quarterfinals; Round of 64; March 15
1	Anderson (SC)	69*
8	Barton	66
4	Carson–Newman	79
5	Lander	82
2	North Georgia	91
7	Emmanuel (GA)	53
3	Wingate	78
6	Clayton State	68

Regional semifinals Round of 32; March 16
1	Anderson (SC)	61
5	Lander	64
2	North Georgia	76
3	Wingate	53

Regional finals Sweet Sixteen; March 18
5	Lander	62
2	North Georgia	73

* – Denotes overtime period

=== South Central Regional ===
- Site: Grand Junction, Colorado (Colorado Mesa)

Regional Quarterfinals; Round of 64; March 15
1	West Texas A&M	68
8	Eastern New Mexico	67
4	Angelo State	76
5	Westminster (UT)	61
2	Colorado Mesa	75
7	Texas A&M–Commerce	65
3	Lubbock Christian	64
6	Tarleton State	53

Regional semifinals Round of 32; March 16
1	West Texas A&M	70*
4	Angelo State	73
2	Colorado Mesa	53
3	Lubbock Christian	56

Regional finals Sweet Sixteen; March 18
4	Angelo State	70
3	Lubbock Christian	76

* – Denotes overtime period

=== West Regional ===
- Site: La Jolla, California (UC San Diego)

Regional Quarterfinals; Round of 64; March 15
1	UC San Diego	81
8	Dominican (CA)	58
4	Azusa Pacific	62
5	Cal Poly Pomona	60
2	Northwest Nazarene	85
7	Humboldt State	75
3	Alaska Anchorage	76
6	Hawaii Pacific	69

Regional semifinals Round of 32; March 16
1	UC San Diego	61
4	Azusa Pacific	64
2	Northwest Nazarene	67
3	Alaska Anchorage	69

Regional finals Sweet Sixteen; March 18
4	Azusa Pacific	65
3	Alaska Anchorage	63

=== Finals ===
Quarterfinals, semifinals and finals were hosted at Alumni Hall in Columbus, Ohio. Regional winners are reseeded in the quarterfinals.

Quarterfinals; Elite Eight; March 26
1	Drury	91
8	Nova Southeastern	60
4	North Georgia	54
5	Lubbock Christian	99
2	Southwestern Oklahoma	71
7	Saint Anselm	61
3	Indiana (PA)	73
6	Azusa Pacific	60

Semifinals; Final Four; March 27
1	Drury	60
5	Lubbock Christian	69
2	Southwestern Oklahoma	66
3	Indiana (PA)	57

Finals; Championship Game; March 29
5	Lubbock Christian	95**
2	Southwestern Oklahoma	85

** – Denotes double-overtime period

== See also ==
- 2019 NCAA Division I women's basketball tournament
- 2019 NCAA Division III women's basketball tournament
- 2019 NAIA Division I women's basketball tournament
- 2019 NAIA Division II women's basketball tournament
- 2019 NCAA Division II men's basketball tournament
