= East Texas A&M Lions women's basketball =

2025–26 East Texas A&M Lions women's basketball team
- University: East Texas A&M University
- Head coach: Valerie King (3rd season)
- Location: Commerce, Texas
- Arena: The Field House (capacity: 3,055)
- Conference: Southland Conference
- Nickname: Lions
- Colors: Blue and gold

NCAA Division I tournament Elite Eight
- Division II: 2007
Other NCAA Division I tournament results
Sweet Sixteen	Division II: 2007
Appearances	2007, 2019, 2020, 2021, 2022

Conference tournament champions
- 2007

Conference regular-season champions
- 2007, 2020, 2021

Uniforms
Home	Away	Alternate

The East Texas A&M Lions women's basketball team (formerly the East Texas State Lions and Texas A&M–Commerce Lions) is the women's intercollegiate basketball program representing East Texas A&M University. The school competes in the Southland Conference (SLC) in Division I of the National Collegiate Athletic Association (NCAA). For their first 51 years of existence, they competed in the Lone Star Conference of Division II. The East Texas A&M women's basketball team plays its home games at the University Field House on the university campus in Commerce, Texas. The Lions have won one conference title and has appeared in the NCAA tournament in 2007, 2019, 2020, and 2021. The team is currently coached by Valerie King.

== History ==
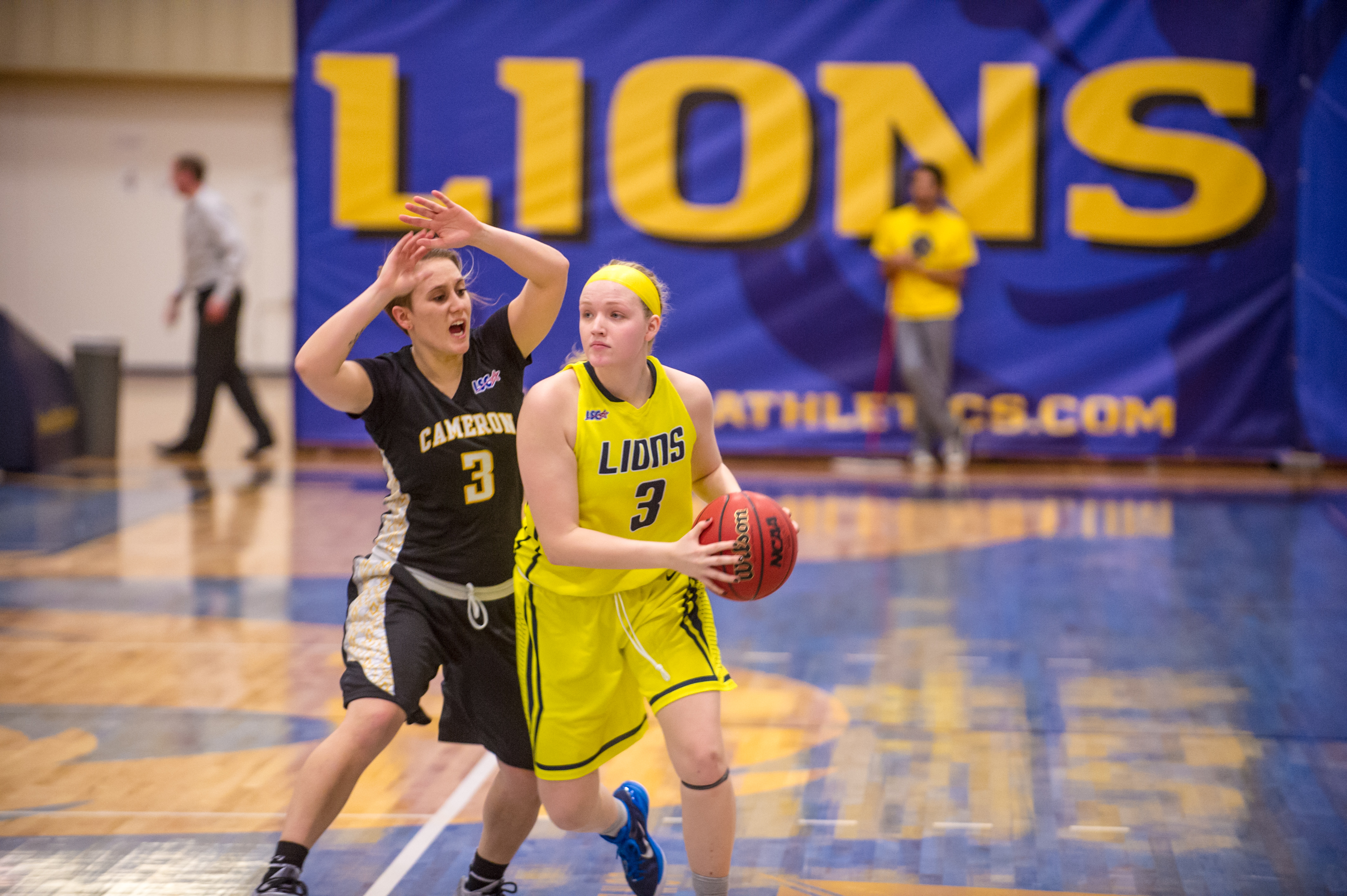
The Lady Lions basketball team in action against the Cameron Aggies in 2015

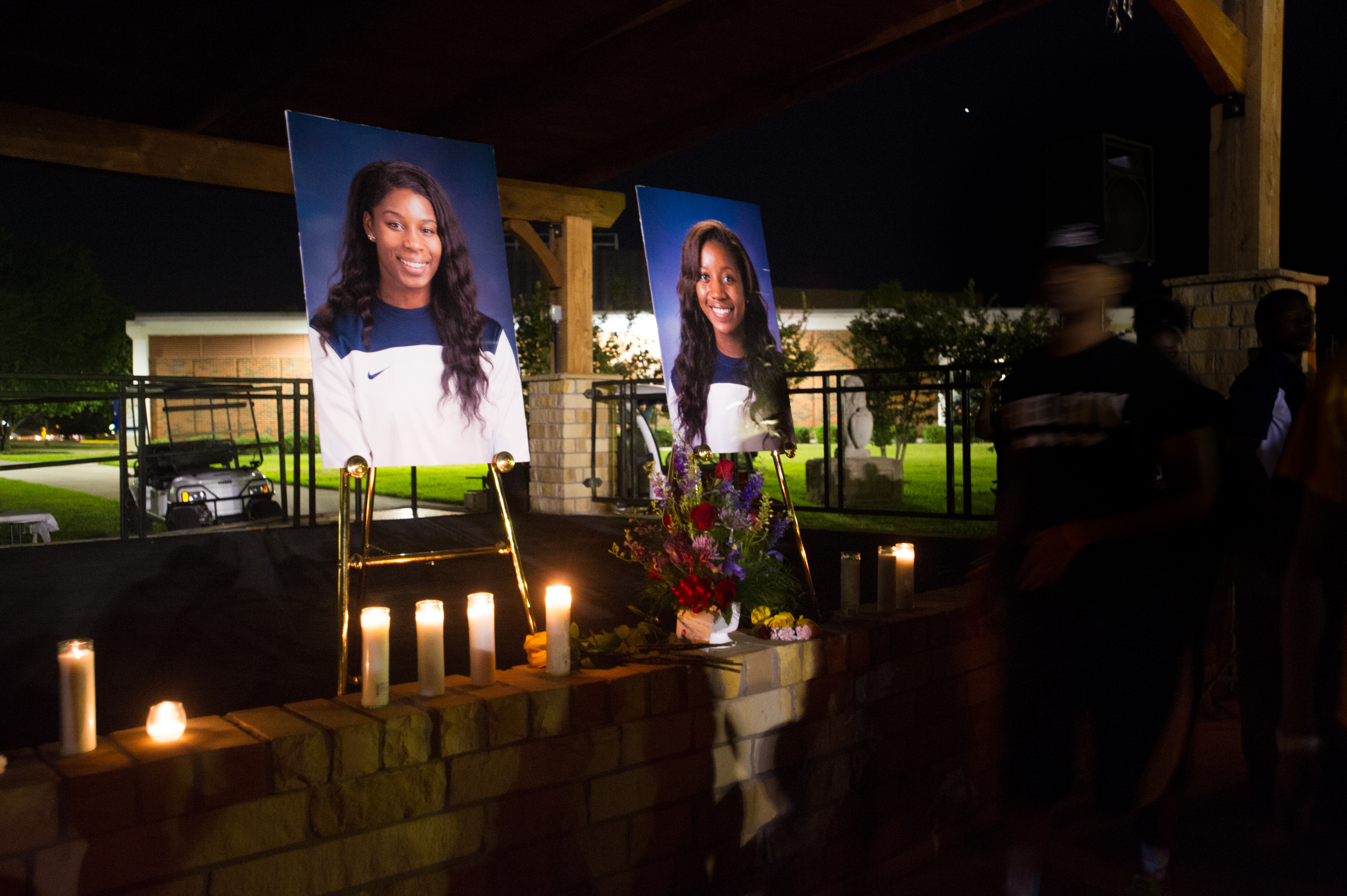
The candlelight service for Devin Oliver and Aubree Butts

The women's team was formed in 1971 and played their first season under Susie Knause and finished off with a 10–6 record. The team's best season came in 2006–07 under coach Denny Downing, when the team finished off with a record of 28–9; the team not only won their first (and only) conference title but also advanced to the Elite Eight in the NCAA tournament only to be eliminated by Clayton State. The 2006–07 team remains as the only team in program history to make it the national tournament.

In 2014, the Lady Lions lost two players (Devin Oliver and Aubree Butts) in a car accident in Paris, Texas, and a candlelight service was held at the university to honor the two and a plaque was placed in a park in Rowlett to honor Oliver (who was a Rowlett High School alumni). Since their deaths, no player on the women's basketball team has worn their jersey numbers (#15 and #25). Under head coach Jason Burton, the Lady Lions went to four consecutive NCAA Division II tournaments from 2019 to 2022; however, the 2020 tournament was cancelled due to the COVID-19 pandemic. During this same time period they also won two conference championships (2020 and 2021). Valerie King took over as head coach of the Lady Lions basketball team beginning in 2023.

== Postseason appearances ==
=== NCAA Division II ===
During their time in NCAA Division II, the Lions were selected to play in the NCAA Division II women's basketball tournament five times. They were selected for the 2020 tournament, but it was not held due to the cancellation of the tournament with the COVID-19 pandemic. They had a combined record of 5–4.

Year	Round	Opponent	Result
2007	First round Second round Sweet Sixteen; Elite Eight	Emporia State; Missouri Western; Washburn; Clayton State	W 81–77; W 73–72; W 71–70; L 55–60
2019	First round	Colorado Mesa	L 65–75
2020	First round	Eastern New Mexico	N/A
2021	First round Regional semifinals	Southern Nazarene; SW Oklahoma	W 70–64; L 79–97
2022	First round Regional semifinals	Colorado Mines; Lubbock Christian	W 80–74; L 67–69

=== Coaches ===
#	Name	Term	GC	OW	OL	OT	O%	CW	CL	CT	C%	PW	PL	CCs	NCs
1	Susie Knause	1971–1985	310	109	201	0	.352	10	19	0	.345	0	0	0	0
2	Kelly Breazeale	1985–1989	102	37	65	0	.363	15	31	0	.326	0	0	0	0
3	Jim Coen	1989–1990	27	7	20	0	.259	5	11	0	.313	0	0	0	0
4	Beth Palmer	1990–1997	190	72	118	0	.379	42	64	0	.396	0	0	0	0
5	Charles Mancil	1997–2002	130	38	92	0	.292	29	47	0	.382	0	0	0	0
6	Denny Downing	2002–2009	205	106	99	0	.517	47	45	0	.511	3	1	1	0
7	Nicole Anderson	2009–2014	132	26	106	0	.197	16	68	0	.190	0	0	0	0
8	Jason Burton	2014–2023	261	171	90	0	.655	110	50	0	.688	2	3	2	0
9	Valerie King	2023–present	90	35	55	0	.389	21	39	0	.350	0	0	0	0

== Roster ==
2023–24 Texas A&M–Commerce Lions women's basketball team
Players
Coaches

Pos.	#	Name	Height	Year	Hometown
G	0	Cova Horvath	5 ft 7 in (1.7 m)	So	Oberwart, Austria
G	1	Dorian Norris	5 ft 11 in (1.8 m)	Jr	Lake Dallas, TX
G	2	Jordyn Newsome	5 ft 8 in (1.73 m)	Jr	Irving, TX
G	3	Mia Deck	5 ft 6 in (1.68 m)	Sr	Frisco, TX
G/F	4	Jamy De Kock	5 ft 11 in (1.8 m)	Jr	Woudrichem, Netherlands
G	10	Ahmya Boyce	5 ft 6 in (1.68 m)	Jr	Newport News, VA
G	11	DaLonna Choice	5 ft 6 in (1.68 m)	So	Mesquite, TX
G	12	Mary Delgado	5 ft 8 in (1.73 m)	Sr	Miami, FL
G	14	Lucia Hervia	5 ft 11 in (1.8 m)	Fr	Almería, Spain
G/F	20	Olivia Russell	5 ft 11 in (1.8 m)	Sr	Auburn Hills, MI
F	21	Jasmine Payne	6 ft 0 in (1.83 m)	Jr	Montgomery, AL
G	24	Jada Hood	5 ft 6 in (1.68 m)	Sr	Roseville, MN
F	30	Jordyn Beaty	6 ft 0 in (1.83 m)	Jr	Woodville, TX
F	32	Harper Biley	6 ft 1 in (1.85 m)	Fr	Cypress, TX

Head coach

- Valerie King (Cincinnati)

Assistant coach(es)

- Tad Wedel (Kansas)
- Brechelle Beachum (Illinois State)
- Trevor Moyer (Saint Mary)/(Oklahoma State)
- Jaedyn De La Cerda (New Mexico)

Legend

- (C) Team captain
- (S) Suspended
- (I) Ineligible
- (W) Walk-on
- Injured
- Current redshirt

Roster
Last update: October 26, 2023

== Arena ==
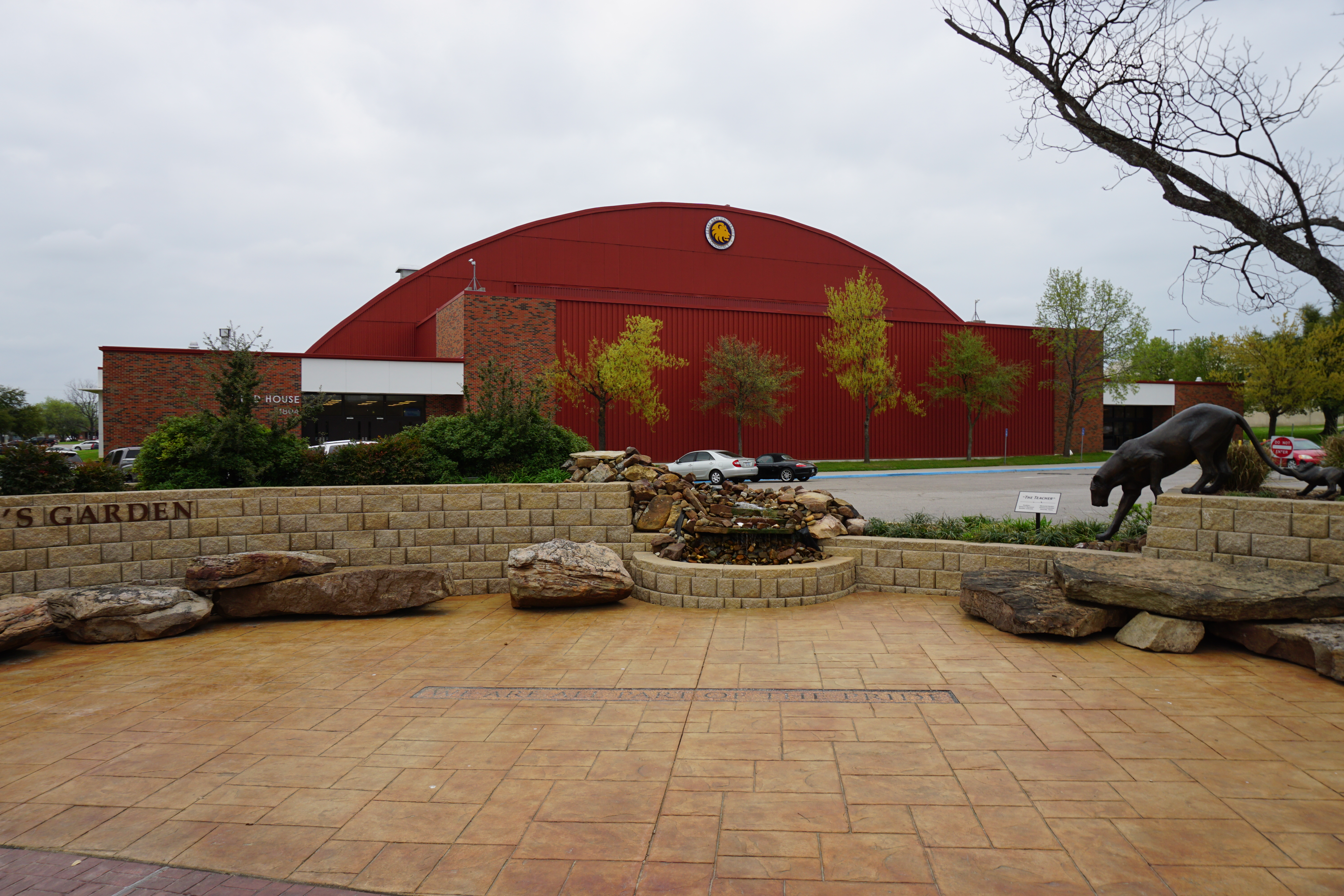
East Texas A&M Field House

The East Texas A&M men's and women's basketball teams both share the university field house along with volleyball. The field house was constructed in 1950 and has been home to men's basketball for over six decades. The Field House covers 69,000 square feet and will seat 3,055 people for either a volleyball or basketball contest. The facility is also the host to the university's Athletic Administration staff, the Sports Medicine Department and the Health and Human Performance Department; in addition to the offices for the basketball, cross country and track and field, golf, soccer and volleyball teams.

The Field House is shaped like an airplane hangar and has space for three basketball courts crossways. The floor allows three games to be played at the same time under one roof. The one lengthwise court is reserved for East Texas A&M basketball and volleyball matches. With an arched roof, 58 feet from the ground at the highest point, is supported on steel beams that are stationed at one end. The university recently upgraded the hardwood court and placed a giant lion head logo in the center of the court similar to the one at Memorial Stadium.

== Notable former players ==
- Althea Byfield – Former professional basketball player and netball bronze medal winner for Jamaica

== See also ==
- East Texas A&M Lions men's basketball
