= O'Reilly Family Event Center =

Drury University sports arena in Springfield, Missouri

- Interactive map of O'Reilly Family Event Center
- Location: 935 N Summit Ave; Springfield, MO 65802
- Coordinates: 37°13′7.05″N 93°17′4.63″W
- Owner: Drury University
- Capacity: 2,850 (athletics); 3,160-3,592 (concerts)
- Record attendance: Women's basketball January 10, 2018 vs. Lane College; 3,258; Men's basketball February 8, 2020 vs. Illinois-Springfield; 3,200

Construction
- Groundbreaking: May 15, 2009
- Opened: October 1, 2010
- Cost: $13.5 million
- Architect: H Design Group
- General contractor: Killian Construction

Tenants
- Drury men's basketball Drury women's basketball Drury volleyball

Website
- O'Reilly Family Event Center

The O'Reilly Family Event Center, or The O', is a sports arena on the campus of Drury University in Springfield, Missouri. O'Reilly is home to the Drury Panthers men's basketball, women's basketball, and volleyball teams. In addition to Drury athletics, O’Reilly has also hosted concerts along with boxing and MMA matches. The arena can seat 2,850 for basketball and volleyball games and up to 3,592 for concerts. The facility is named after the O'Reilly family of O'Reilly Auto Parts.

== Construction and opening ==
On December 19, 2007, Drury University officials announced that their new basketball arena was going to be named after the O'Reilly family of Springfield after they donated $6 million towards the arena which was then budgeted at $12 million. Drury University basketball and volleyball had previously called Weiser Gym home since 1948, which is currently home to Men's Wrestling. The arena was originally expected to be completed by fall 2009 and seat 4,000 spectators (reduced to 3,100 by November 2008). After fundraising delays, O'Reilly's groundbreaking ceremony was held on May 15, 2009, as its budget increased to $13.5 million. In January 2010, the arena reached LEED Gold status—the first sports arena in the United States to receive the award. O'Reilly's funding gap was filled with a $500,000 donation on May 12, 2010.

O'Reilly Family Event Center celebrated its grand opening on October 1, 2010. The grand opening included a concert by Springfield-based The M-Dock Band. October 8, 2010 marked the first intercollegiate matchup at O'Reilly as the Drury volleyball team played Missouri S&T; the Panthers lost 3–1. Aretha Franklin was to perform a concert at O'Reilly on October 30, but canceled due to health concerns. November 13, 2010 marked the first regular season basketball games at the arena for both Drury women's and men's basketball as the women fell to Northeastern State and the men defeated Upper Iowa.

== Regional tournaments ==
As of 2024, O'Reilly has hosted six NCAA Division II regionals for men's basketball, women's basketball, and volleyball, five of which have been won by Drury University. Drury Women's Basketball, who went undefeated at 32–0 for the 2019–20 season, was set to host the 2020 Midwest Regional, but the tournament for that season was canceled as it coincided with the beginning of the COVID-19 pandemic.

=== Men's basketball ===
Year	Tournament name	Champion
2013	Midwest Regional	Drury University
2014	Midwest Regional	Drury University

=== Women's basketball ===
Year	Tournament name	Champion
2014	Midwest Regional	Drury University
2019	Midwest Regional	Drury University
2021	Midwest Regional	Drury University

=== Volleyball ===
Year	Tournament name	Champion
2018	Midwest Regional	Lewis

== Special events ==
=== Concerts and speakers ===
Throughout its history, O'Reilly has hosted many concerts ranging from small, local bands to world-renowned groups and singers. Some well-known bands and singers who have performed at O'Reilly include: Sheryl Crow, Chicago, REO Speedwagon (ft. Styx and Ted Nugent), Kelly Clarkson, Incubus, and The Steve Miller Band. 3 Doors Down and Asking Alexandria have performed opening acts for O'Reilly concerts. While O'Reilly has not seen many speakers, animal scientist Temple Grandin notably spoke there in front of around 2,500 spectators on March 3, 2011.

=== Boxing and MMA ===
Multiple combat sporting events have taken place at the O'Reilly Family Event Center, particularly during its first years of operation. Missouri native BJ Flores fought at O'Reilly twice during his career.

Winner in bold

Date	Sport	Main event	Outcome	Source
July 23, 2011	Boxing	**BJ Flores** vs. Nicholas Ianuzzi	TKO	
October 15, 2011	Boxing	**BJ Flores** vs. Paul Jennette	Unanimous	
February 11, 2012	MMA	**Zak Cummings** vs. Lamont Stafford	Submission	
March 24, 2012	Boxing	**Kimbo Slice** vs. Brian Green	Knockout	
June 16, 2012	MMA	**John Gunderson** vs. Karo Parisyan; ShoFight 20	Submission (Guillotine)	
