= 2021 NCAA Division II women's basketball tournament =

- Teams: 48
- Finals site: Alumni Hall, Columbus, Ohio
- Champions: Lubbock Christian (3rd title)
- Runner-up: Drury (2nd title game)
- Semifinalists: Central Missouri (6th Final Four); Lander (1st Final Four)
- Winning coach: Steve Gomez (3rd title)

The 2021 NCAA Division II women's basketball tournament was the 39th annual tournament hosted by the NCAA to determine the national champion of Division II women's collegiate basketball in the United States.

The Elite Eight was held at Alumni Hall at Ohio Dominican University in Columbus, Ohio from March 23–26, 2021.

Defending champions Lubbock Christian defeated Drury in the championship game, 69–59, to claim the Lady Chaps' third overall and second consecutive national title. Lubbock Christian additionally finished the season undefeated (23-0).

== Qualification ==
A total of 48 bids were available for the tournament: 16 automatic (awarded to the champions of the sixteen Division II conferences that crowned a basketball champion after the end of the regular season) and 32 at-large.

The field size was temporarily reduced for just the 2021 championship to account for teams and conferences that chose to not compete during the 2020–21 season due to the COVID-19 pandemic.

Teams from six conferences (CCAA, CIAA, Northeast-10, PSAC, SIAC and Sunshine State) did not participate in the regular season and were ineligible for tournament bids.

The remaining bids are allocated evenly among the eight NCAA-designated regions (Atlantic, Central, East, Midwest, South, South Central, Southeast, and West). Some teams, however, were placed outside their conferences' traditional regions to ensure an even distribution of teams across all eight regionals. As a result, each regions consists of two to three automatic qualifiers (the teams who won their respective conference tournaments) and two to four at-large bids.

=== Automatic bids (16) ===
Automatic bids
Region	Conference	Qualifying school	Record
Atlantic	CIAA	None awarded	
Atlantic	Mountain East	Charleston (WV)	17–2
Atlantic	PSAC	None awarded	
Central	Great American	Southern Nazarene	12–7
Central	MIAA	Nebraska–Kearney	22–3
Central	Northern Sun	Minnesota Duluth	13–1
East	CACC	Dominican (NY)	12–1
East	East Coast	Roberts Wesleyan	10–6
East	Northeast-10	None awarded	
Midwest	GLIAC	Michigan Tech	20–1
Midwest	GLVC	Drury	20–1
Midwest	G-MAC	Tiffin	16–8
South	Gulf South	Union (TN)	18–5
South	SIAC	None awarded	
South	Sunshine State	None awarded	
South Central	Lone Star	Lubbock Christian	18–0
South Central	RMAC	Black Hills State	14–8
Southeast	Carolinas	Belmont Abbey	22–2
Southeast	Peach Belt	North Georgia	17–1
Southeast	South Atlantic	Tusculum	18–3
West	CCAA	None awarded	
West	GNAC	None awarded	
West	PacWest	Hawaii Pacific	13–0

=== At-large bids (32) ===
At-large bids
Qualifying school	Conference	Record (Conf.)
American International	Northeast-10	7–1
Arkansas Tech	Great American	14–2
Ashland	GLIAC	14–8
Azusa Pacific	PacWest	10–4
Barton	Carolinas	12–2
Cameron	Lone Star	11–7
Carson-Newman	South Atlantic	15–3
Catawba	South Atlantic	10–3
Cedarville	G-MAC	19–5
Central Missouri	MIAA	19–4
Colorado Mines	RMAC	17–3
Concordia (NY)	Central Atlantic	6–5
Daemen	East Coast	12–2
Emporia State	MIAA	18–6
Fort Hays State	MIAA	22–3
Georgian Court	Central Atlantic	8–1
Glenville State	Mountain East	12–3
Grand Valley State	GLIAC	14–5
Kentucky Wesleyan	G-MAC	18–5
Lander	Peach Belt	17–1
Lee (TN)	Gulf South	15–7
Montevallo	Gulf South	14–6
Northwood	GLIAC	11–8
Southwestern Oklahoma	Great American	17–3
St. Cloud State	Northern Sun	12–5
Texas A&M–Commerce	Lone Star	13–3
Truman	GLIAC	16–4
Tuskegee	SIAC	12–1
Valdosta State	Gulf South	17–3
Walsh	G-MAC	16–6
Western Colorado	RMAC	14–5
Westminster (UT)	RMAC	11–5

== Bracket ==
=== Atlantic Regional ===
- Site: Columbus, Ohio (Ohio Dominican)

First round March 12, 2021
4	Cedarville	71
5	Walsh	88
3	Kentucky Wesleyan	56
6	Tiffin	70

Regional semifinals March 13, 2021
1	Charleston (WV)	79
5	Walsh	73
2	Glenville State	83
6	Tiffin	85

Regional finals March 15, 2021
1	Charleston (WV)	82
6	Tiffin	52

=== Central Regional ===
- Site: Warrensburg, Missouri (Central Missouri)

First round March 12, 2021
4	Central Missouri	66
5	St. Cloud State	52
3	Minnesota–Duluth	76
6	Emporia State	70

Regional semifinals March 13, 2021
1	Fort Hays State	68
4	Central Missouri	72
2	Nebraska–Kearney	65
3	Minnesota–Duluth	57

Regional finals March 15, 2021
4	Central Missouri	67
2	Nebraska–Kearney	57

=== East Regional ===
- Site: Amherst, New York (Daemen)

First round March 12, 2021
4	American International	61
5	Roberts Wesleyan	75
3	Georgian Court	61
6	Concordia (NY)	54

Regional semifinals March 13, 2021
1	Dominican (NY)	73
5	Roberts Wesleyan	77
2	Daemen	73
3	Georgian Court	54

Regional finals March 15, 2021
5	Roberts Wesleyan	40
2	Daemen	58

=== Midwest Regional ===
- Site: O'Reilly Family Event Center, Springfield, Missouri (Drury)

First round March 12, 2021
4	Grand Valley State	60
5	Ashland	68
3	Truman	55
6	Northwood	42

Regional semifinals March 13, 2021
1	Michigan Tech	65
5	Ashland	74
2	Drury	66
3	Truman	51

Regional finals March 15, 2021
5	Ashland	69
2	Drury	88

=== South Regional ===
- Site: Dahlonega, Georgia (North Georgia)

First round March 12, 2021
4	Union (TN)	70
5	Montevallo	65
3	Valdosta State	74
6	Lee	64

Regional semifinals March 13, 2021
1	North Georgia	66
4	Union (TN)	58
2	Lander	63
3	Valdosta State	60

Regional finals March 15, 2021
1	North Georgia	48
2	Lander	67

=== Southeast Regional ===
- Site: Jefferson City, Tennessee (Carson-Newman)

First round March 12, 2021
4	Tusculum	77
5	Tuskegee	64
3	Carson-Newman	48
6	Catawba	67

Regional semifinals March 13, 2021
1	Belmont Abbey	74
4	Tusculum	59
2	Barton	80
6	Catawba	64

Regional finals March 15, 2021
1	Belmont Abbey	62
2	Barton	52

=== South Central Regional ===
- Site: Canyon, Texas (West Texas A&M)

First round March 12, 2021
4	Arkansas Tech
5	Cameron	w/o
3	Texas A&M–Commerce	70
6	Southern Nazarene	64

Regional semifinals March 13, 2021
1	Lubbock Christian	96
5	Cameron	66
2	SW Oklahoma	97
3	Texas A&M–Commerce	79

Regional finals March 15, 2021
1	Lubbock Christian	78
2	SW Oklahoma	65

=== West Regional ===
- Site: Grand Junction, Colorado (Colorado Mesa)

First round March 12, 2021
4	Azusa Pacific	72
5	Hawaii Pacific	59
3	Westminster (UT)	74
6	Black Hills State	65

Regional semifinals March 13, 2021
1	Colorado Mines
4	Azusa Pacific	w/o
2	Western Colorado	52
3	Westminster (UT)	68

Regional finals March 15, 2021
4	Azusa Pacific	53
3	Westminster (UT)	48

=== Elite Eight ===
- Site: Alumni Hall, Columbus, Ohio

Elite Eight; March 23, 2021
1	Lubbock Christian	66
8	Daemen	49
5	Central Missouri	65
4	Belmont Abbey	42
3	Drury	74
6	Charleston (WV)	66
7	Azusa Pacific	76
2	Lander	88

Final Four; March 24, 2021
1	Lubbock Christian	63
5	Central Missouri	61
3	Drury	74
2	Lander	65

National championship March 26, 2021
1	Lubbock Christian	69
3	Drury	59

== See also ==
- 2021 NCAA Division I women's basketball tournament
- 2021 NCAA Division III women's basketball tournament
- 2021 NAIA women's basketball tournament
- 2021 NCAA Division II men's basketball tournament
