= 2025 NCAA Division II women's basketball tournament =

- Teams: 64
- Finals site: UPMC Cooper Fieldhouse, Pittsburgh, Pennsylvania
- Champions: Grand Valley State (2nd title)
- Runner-up: Cal State Dominguez Hills (1st title game)
- Semifinalists: Pittsburg State (1st Final Four); Union (TN) (2nd Final Four)

The 2025 NCAA Division II women's basketball tournament was the single-elimination tournament to determine the national champion of women's NCAA Division II college basketball in the United States to culminate the 2024–25 NCAA Division II women's basketball season. The tournament featured 64 teams.

The national quarterfinals (Elite Eight), semifinals, and finals were played from March 24–28, 2025 at the UPMC Cooper Fieldhouse in Pittsburgh, Pennsylvania.

Grand Valley State defeated Cal State Dominguez Hills in the championship game, 70–58, the Lakers' second Division II national title.

== Tournament schedule and venues ==
2025 NCAA Division II Women's Tournament sites – regionals (blue), Elite Eight (red)

=== Regionals ===
First, second, and third-round games (the latter of which serves as a regional championship) were held at campus sites from March 14–17, 2025. The top-seeded team in each regional served as host.

=== Elite Eight ===
The national quarterfinals, semifinals, and finals were held at a predetermined site, the UPMC Cooper Fieldhouse in Pittsburgh, Pennsylvania.

== Bracket ==
=== Atlantic regional ===
- Site: Edinboro, Pennsylvania (Edinboro)

First round March 14
1	Edinboro	80
8	Virginia State	68
4	Indiana	76
5	Fairmont State	59
2	Gannon	60
7	Fayetteville State	50
3	Seton Hill	87
6	Kutztown	75

Regional semifinals March 15
1	Edinboro	52
4	Indiana	67
2	Gannon	80
3	Seton Hill	70

Regional Finals; March 17
4	Indiana	59
2	Gannon	72

=== Central regional ===
- Site: Pittsburg, Kansas (Pittsburg State)

First round March 14
1	Pittsburg State	87
8	Harding	75
4	Missouri Western	73
5	Minnesota State	87
2	Concordia St. Paul	64
7	Southwest Minnesota State	77
3	Fort Hays State	81
6	Southern Nazarene	72

Regional semifinals March 15
1	Pittsburg State	94
5	Minnesota State	91
7	Southwest Minnesota State	77
3	Fort Hays State	63

Regional Finals; March 17
1	Pittsburg State	85
7	Southwest Minnesota State	82

=== East regional ===
- Site: Waltham, Massachusetts (Bentley)

First round March 14
1	Bentley	65
8	New Haven	39
4	St. Anselm	59
5	Southern Connecticut	41
2	Daemen	70
7	Jefferson	49
3	Holy Family	61
6	Assumption	56

Regional semifinals March 15
1	Bentley	60
4	St. Anselm	55
2	Daemen	55
3	Holy Family	68

Regional Finals; March 17
1	Bentley	72
3	Holy Family	63

=== Midwest regional ===
- Site: Allendale, Michigan (Grand Valley State)

First round March 14
1	Grand Valley State	108
8	Quincy	72
4	Wayne State	77
5	Lewis	57
2	Ashland	62
7	Ferris State	50
3	Northern Michigan	61
6	Hillsdale	56

Regional semifinals March 15
1	Grand Valley State	87
4	Wayne State	54
2	Ashland	68
3	Northern Michigan	45

Regional Finals; March 17
1	Grand Valley State	62
2	Ashland	50

=== South regional ===
- Site: Jackson, Tennessee (Union)

First round March 14
1	Union (TN)	107
8	Miles	69
4	Tampa	63
5	Lee	66
2	Embry–Riddle	70
7	West Florida	56
3	Nova Southeastern	80
6	Alabama–Huntsville	73

Regional semifinals March 15
1	Union (TN)	75
5	Lee	53
2	Embry–Riddle	63
3	Nova Southeastern	66

Regional Finals; March 17
1	Union (TN)	65
3	Nova Southeastern	60

=== South Central regional ===
- Site: Denton, Texas (Texas Woman's)

First round March 14
1	Texas Woman's	75
8	Adams State	52
4	Colorado Mesa	52
5	Eastern New Mexico	56
2	Lubbock Christian	68
7	UC Colorado Springs	65
3	UT Tyler	47
6	West Texas A&M	58

Regional semifinals March 15
1	Texas Woman's	71
5	Eastern New Mexico	48
2	Lubbock Christian	73
6	West Texas A&M	60

Regional Finals; March 17
1	Texas Woman's	54
2	Lubbock Christian	62

=== Southeast regional ===
- Site: Dahlonega, Georgia (North Georgia)

First round March 14
1	North Georgia	78
8	UNC Pembroke	64
4	Francis Marion	83
5	Columbus State	89*
2	Coker	58
7	Belmont Abbey	50
3	Anderson	71
6	Carson–Newman	75

Regional semifinals March 15
1	North Georgia	64
5	Columbus State	56
2	Coker	48
6	Carson-Newman	44

Regional Finals; March 17
1	North Georgia	54
2	Coker	64

=== West regional ===
- Site: Carson, California (Cal State Dominguez Hills)

First round March 14
1	Cal State Dominguez Hills	77
8	Azusa Pacific	58
4	Alaska Anchorage	69
5	Montana State Billings	66
2	Cal Poly Pomona	52
7	Chico State	57*
3	Point Loma	53
6	Central Washington	74

Regional semifinals March 15
1	Cal State Dominguez Hills	63
4	Alaska Anchorage	61
7	Chico State	73
6	Central Washington	79

Regional Finals; March 17
1	Cal State Dominguez Hills	70
6	Central Washington	47

=== Elite Eight ===
- Site: UPMC Cooper Fieldhouse, Pittsburgh, Pennsylvania

Elite Eight; March 24; ESPN+
1	Grand Valley State	60
8	Gannon	32
4	Pittsburg State	66
5	Lubbock Christian	55
2	Bentley	66
7	Union (TN)	80
3	Cal State Dominguez Hills	82
6	Coker	66

Final Four; March 26; ESPN+
1	Grand Valley State	68
4	Pittsburg State	61
7	Union (TN)	50
3	Cal State Dominguez Hills	68

National Championship; March 28; ESPN+
1	Grand Valley State	70
3	Cal State Dominguez Hills	58

* denotes overtime

== See also ==
- 2025 NCAA Division I women's basketball tournament
- 2025 NCAA Division III women's basketball tournament
- 2025 NAIA women's basketball tournament
- 2025 NCAA Division II men's basketball tournament
