= 2014 NCAA Division II women's basketball tournament =

Annual women's basketball tournament

- Teams: 64
- Finals site: Erie Insurance Arena, Erie, Pennsylvania
- Champions: Bentley (1st title)
- Runner-up: West Texas A&M (2nd title game)
- Semifinalists: Cal Poly Pomona (10th Final Four); Nova Southeastern (1st Final Four)
- Winning coach: Barbara Stevens (1st title)
- MOP: Jacqui Brugliera (Bentley)

The 2014 NCAA Division II women's basketball tournament was the 33rd annual tournament hosted by the NCAA to determine the national champion of Division II women's collegiate basketball in the United States.

Bentley defeated West Texas A&M in the championship game, 73–65, to claim the Falcons' first NCAA Division II national title.

The championship rounds were contested at the Erie Insurance Arena in Erie, Pennsylvania.

== Regionals ==
=== South Central - Canyon, Texas ===
Location: First United Bank Center Host: West Texas A&M University

First round Round of 64; March 14
1	West Texas A&M	90
8	St. Edward's	73
4	Colorado State-Pueblo	57
5	St. Mary's (TX)	63
3	Tarleton State	70
6	Texas A&M International	55
2	Colorado Mesa	60
7	Midwestern State	49

Regional semifinals Round of 32; March 15
1	West Texas A&M	79
5	St. Mary's (TX)	66
2	Tarleton State	44
3	Colorado Mesa	66

Regional finals Sweet 16; March 17
1	West Texas A&M	59
2	Colorado Mesa	56

=== Southeast - Hickory, North Carolina ===
Location: Shuford Memorial Gymnasium Host: Lenoir-Rhyne College

First round Round of 64; March 14
1	Lenoir-Rhyne	56
8	Armstrong Atlantic	64
4	North Georgia	85
5	Columbus State	83
3	Wingate	86
6	Belmont Abbey	93
2	Clayton State	65
7	Limestone	75

Regional semifinals Round of 32; March 15
8	Armstrong Atlantic	72
4	North Georgia	70
7	Belmont Abbey	62
6	Limestone	78

Regional finals Sweet 16; March 17
8	Armstrong Atlantic	55
7	Limestone	74

=== South - Davie, Florida ===
Location: University Center Host: Nova Southeastern University

First round Round of 64; March 14
1	Nova Southeastern	75
8	Benedict	61
4	Delta State	45
5	Albany State	49
3	Rollins	56
6	St. Leo	48
2	Tampa	77
7	West Florida	62

Regional semifinals Round of 32; March 15
1	Nova Southeastern	96
5	Albany State	69
3	Rollins	57
2	Tampa	75

Regional finals Sweet 16; March 17
1	Nova Southeastern	56
2	Tampa	53

=== Central - Emporia, Kansas ===
Location: White Auditorium Host: Emporia State University

First round Round of 64; March 14
1	Emporia State	97
8	Southwestern Oklahoma State	65
4	Wayne State (NE)	83
5	Pittsburg State	77
3	Central Missouri	82
6	Northern State	69
2	Harding	57
7	Concordia-St. Paul	68

Regional semifinals Round of 32; March 15
1	Emporia State	76
4	Wayne State (NE)	69
3	Central Missouri	60
7	Concordia-St. Paul	85

Regional finals Sweet 16; March 17
1	Emporia State	67
7	Concordia-St. Paul	70

=== West - Pomona, California ===
Location: Kellogg Gymnasium Host: California State Polytechnic University, Pomona

First round Round of 64; March 14
1	Cal Poly Pomona	60
8	Alaska Anchorage	56
4	Cal State Dominguez Hills	70
5	Chico State	90
3	Simon Fraser	77
6	Western Washington	70
2	Montana State-Billings	60
7	Academy of Art	59

Regional semifinals Round of 32; March 15
1	Cal Poly Pomona	89
5	Chico State	80
3	Simon Fraser	68
2	Montana State-Billings	76

Regional finals Sweet 16; March 17
1	Cal Poly Pomona	75
2	Montana State-Billings	68

=== Atlantic - Glenville, West Virginia ===
Location: Jesse R. Lilly, Jr. Gymnasium Host: Glenville State College

First round Round of 64; March 14
1	Glenville State	82
8	West Liberty	70
4	Bloomsburg	75
5	Virginia State	57
3	Gannon	76
6	Shaw	70
2	Edinboro	64
7	Charleston (WV)	62

Regional semifinals Round of 32; March 15
1	Glenville State	78
4	Bloomsburg	91
3	Gannon	69
2	Edinboro	77

Regional finals Sweet 16; March 17
4	Bloomsburg	76
2	Edinboro	82

=== East - Waltham, Massachusetts ===
Location: Dana Center Host: Bentley College

First round Round of 64; March 14
1	Bentley	80
8	Bloomfield	65
4	Stonehill	79
5	District of Columbia	61
3	LIU Post	60
6	Assumption	59
2	Adelphi	92
7	New Haven	86

Regional semifinals Round of 32; March 15
1	Bentley	79
4	Stonehill	63
3	LIU Post	85
2	Adelphi	83

Regional finals Sweet 16; March 17
1	Bentley	83
3	LIU Post	62

=== Midwest - Springfield, Missouri ===
Location: O'Reilly Family Event Center Host: Drury University

First round Round of 64; March 14
1	Drury	74
8	Truman State	68
4	Northern Michigan	58
5	Quincy	65
3	Indianapolis	58
6	Wayne State (MI)	63
2	Lewis	69
7	Missouri-St. Louis	64

Regional semifinals Round of 32; March 16
1	Drury	78
5	Quincy	58
6	Wayne State (MI)	87
2	Lewis	80

Regional finals Sweet 16; March 17
1	Drury	99
6	Wayne State (MI)	63

== Elite Eight - Erie, Pennsylvania ==
Location: Erie Insurance Arena Host: Gannon University

National quarterfinals Elite Eight; March 25
West Texas A&M	81
Limestone	44
Nova Southeastern	72
Concordia–St. Paul	64
Cal Poly Pomona	81
Edinboro	61
Bentley	74
Drury	66

National semifinals Final Four; March 26
West Texas A&M	80
Nova Southeastern	66
Cal Poly Pomona	62
Bentley	77

National championship March 28
West Texas A&M	65
Bentley	73

== All-tournament team ==
- Jacqui Brugliera, Bentley
- Lauren Battista, Bentley
- Courtney Finn, Bentley
- Chontiquah White, West Texas A&M
- Jade Blackwell, Cal Poly Pomona

== See also ==
- 2014 NCAA Division I women's basketball tournament
- 2014 NCAA Division III women's basketball tournament
- 2014 NAIA Division I women's basketball tournament
- 2014 NAIA Division II women's basketball tournament
- 2014 NCAA Division II men's basketball tournament
