= Northwest Nazarene Nighthawks =

Intercollegiate sports teams

- University: Northwest Nazarene University
- Nickname: Nighthawks
- NCAA: Division II
- Conference: Great Northwest Athletic Conference
- Athletic director: Paul Rush
- Location: Nampa, Idaho
- Varsity teams: 16 (7 men’s and 9 women’s) (17 (8 men's and 9 women's in 2025-26))
- Basketball arena: Johnson Sports Center
- Baseball stadium: Elmore W. Vail Baseball Field
- Softball stadium: Bobby Welch Halle Softball Field
- Soccer field: NNU Soccer Field
- Colors: Red, white, black, and gray
- Mascot: Howard the Elk
- Website: nnusports.com
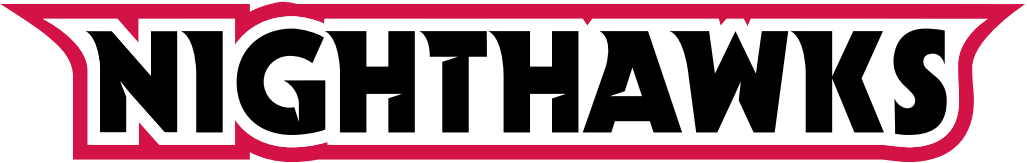

The Northwest Nazarene Nighthawks (formerly the Crusaders) are the athletic teams that represent Northwest Nazarene University, located in Nampa, Idaho, in intercollegiate sports as a member of the Division II level of the National Collegiate Athletic Association (NCAA), primarily competing in the Great Northwest Athletic Conference (GNAC) since the 2001–02 academic year.

The Nighthawks previously competed in the D-II Pacific West Conference (PacWest) during the 2000–01 school year; and in the Cascade Collegiate Conference (CCC) of the National Association of Intercollegiate Athletics (NAIA) from 1993–94 to 1999–2000.

== Sports sponsored ==
Men's sports	Women's sports
Baseball	Basketball
Basketball	Cross country
Cross country	Golf
Golf	Lacrosse^{1}
Lacrosse	Soccer
Soccer	Softball
Track and field	Track and field
^{1} – club teams

== Rivalries ==
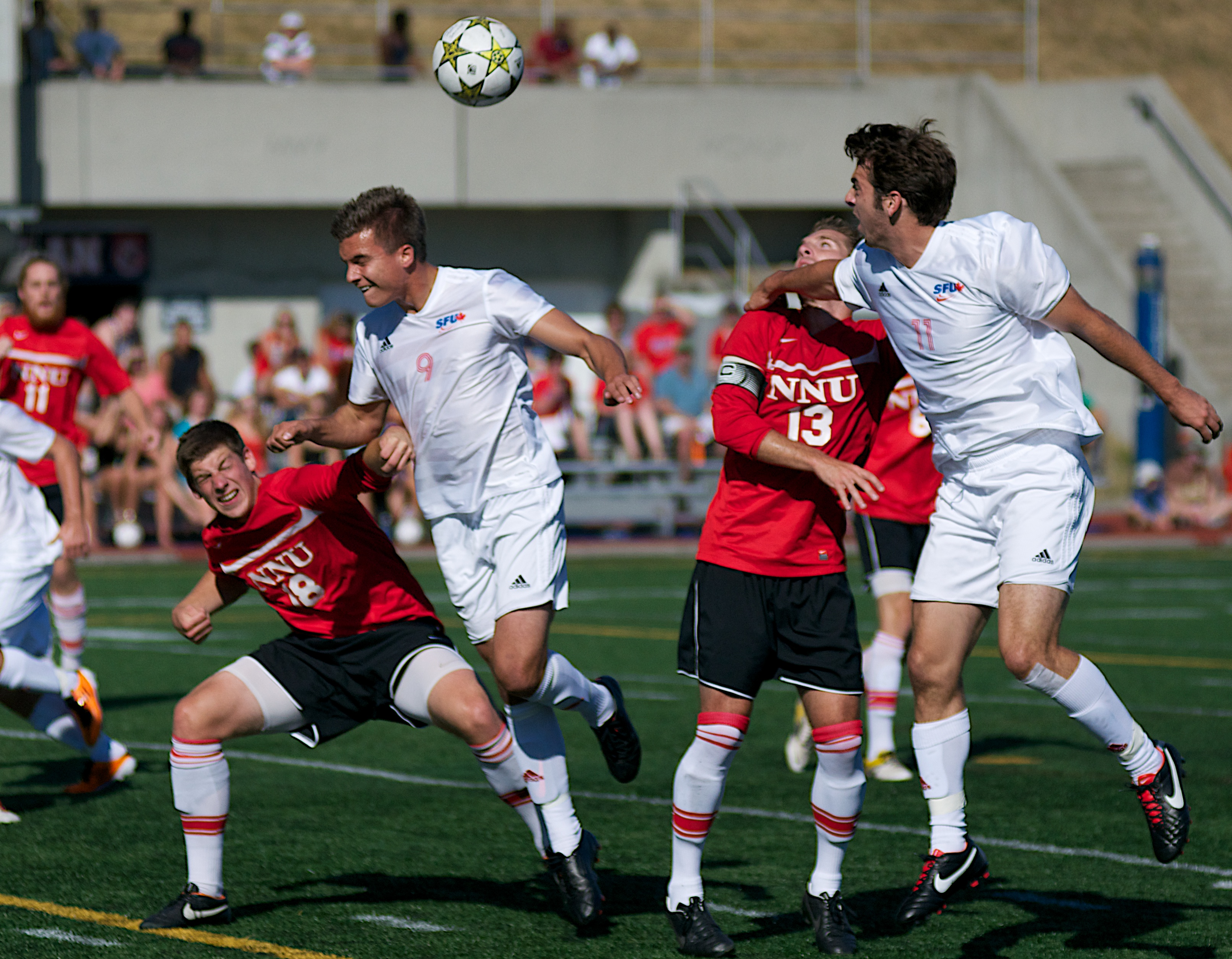
NNU (red shirts) v Simon Fraser, men's soccer match in 2012

The school's main rival is the NAIA's College of Idaho, located a short distance to the west in Caldwell, Idaho.

== Notable people ==
A prominent former member of the school's athletic department is Scott Flemming, who coached India’s national basketball team for several years.
