= 2018 NCAA Division II women's basketball tournament =

- Teams: 64
- Finals site: , Sanford Pentagon; Sioux Falls, South Dakota
- Champions: Central Missouri Jennies (2nd title)
- Runner-up: Ashland Eagles (3rd title game)
- Semifinalists: Indiana Crimson Hawks (3rd Final Four); Union Bulldogs (1st Final Four)
- Winning coach: Dave Slifer (1st title)
- Attendance: 1,249

The 2018 NCAA Division II women's basketball tournament involved 64 teams playing in a single-elimination tournament to determine the NCAA Division II women's college basketball national champion. It began on March 9, 2018, and concluded with the championship game on March 23, 2018.

The first three rounds were hosted by top-seeded teams in regional play. The eight regional winners met for the quarterfinal and semifinals, better known as the "Elite Eight" and "Final Four" respectively, and National Championship game at the Sanford Pentagon in Sioux Falls, South Dakota.

The Central Missouri Jennies defeated the Ashland Eagles, 66–52, to win the championship and end Ashland's 73-game winning streak.

== Bracket ==
=== Atlantic Regional ===
- Site: Richmond, Virginia (Virginia Union)

Regional Quarterfinals; Round of 64; March 9
1	Virginia Union	56
8	Bowie State	63
4	Edinboro	80
5	Virginia State	55
2	Glenville State	118
7	West Chester	87
3	Indiana (PA)	90
6	California (PA)	65

Regional semifinals Round of 32; March 10
8	Bowie State	79
4	Edinboro	75
2	Glenville State	68
3	Indiana (PA)	88

Regional finals Sweet Sixteen; March 12
8	Bowie State	60
3	Indiana (PA)	75

=== Central Regional ===
- Site: Sioux Falls, South Dakota (Augustana (SD))

Regional Quarterfinals; Round of 64; March 9
1	Augustana (SD)	75
8	Lindenwood	41
4	Arkansas Tech	65
5	Northern State	76
2	Central Missouri	66
7	Minnesota State–Moorhead	49
3	Southwestern Oklahoma	75
6	Fort Hays State	78

Regional semifinals Round of 32; March 10
1	Augustana (SD)	90
5	Northern State	86
2	Central Missouri	66
6	Fort Hays State	59

Regional finals Sweet Sixteen; March 12
1	Augustana (SD)	42
2	Central Missouri	81

=== East Regional ===
- Site: Easton, Massachusetts (Stonehill)

Regional Quarterfinals; Round of 64; March 9
1	Stonehill	70
8	Southern Connecticut	45
4	St. Thomas Aquinas	61
5	Caldwell	45
2	Bentley	71
7	Jefferson	66
3	University of the Sciences	61
6	LIU Post	50

Regional semifinals Round of 32; March 10
1	Stonehill	63
4	St. Thomas Aquinas	52
2	Bentley	54
3	University of the Sciences	61

Regional finals Sweet Sixteen; March 12
1	Stonehill	71
3	University of the Sciences	61

=== Midwest Regional ===
- Site: Ashland, Ohio (Ashland)

Regional Quarterfinals; Round of 64; March 9
1	Ashland	104
8	Hillsdale	82
4	Michigan Tech	54
5	Grand Valley State	75
2	Drury	76
7	Findlay	72
3	Southern Indiana	64
6	Lewis	72

Regional semifinals Round of 32; March 10
1	Ashland	80
5	Grand Valley State	68
2	Drury	63
6	Lewis	49

Regional finals Sweet Sixteen; March 12
1	Ashland	79
2	Drury	73

=== South Regional ===
- Site: Jackson, Tennessee (Union (TN))

Regional Quarterfinals; Round of 64; March 9
1	Union (TN)	94
8	Clark Atlanta	50
4	Embry-Riddle	57
5	Eckerd	54
2	Florida Southern	60
7	Valdosta State	63
3	North Alabama	64
6	Lee	66

Regional semifinals Round of 32; March 10
1	Union (TN)	74
4	Embry-Riddle	59
7	Valdosta State	63*
6	Lee	57

Regional finals Sweet Sixteen; March 12
1	Union (TN)	74
7	Valdosta State	73

=== Southeast Regional ===
- Site: Jefferson City, Tennessee (Carson-Newman)

Regional Quarterfinals; Round of 64; March 9
1	Carson-Newman	70
8	Anderson (SC)	62
4	Lander	84
5	Limestone	53
2	Wingate	90
7	Columbus State	79
3	North Georgia	81
6	Barton	76

Regional semifinals Round of 32; March 10
1	Carson-Newman	96
4	Lander	85
2	Wingate	75
3	North Georgia	78

Regional finals Sweet Sixteen; March 12
1	Carson-Newman	75
3	North Georgia	71

=== South Central Regional ===
- Site: Lubbock, Texas (Lubbock Christian)

Regional Quarterfinals; Round of 64; March 9
1	Lubbock Christian	78
8	Tarleton State	46
4	Angelo State	87
5	Black Hills State	75
2	West Texas A&M	81
7	Arkansas-Fort Smith	66
3	Colorado State Pueblo	70
6	Metro State	78

Regional semifinals Round of 32; March 10
1	Lubbock Christian	61
4	Angelo State	59
2	West Texas A&M	70
6	Metro State	60

Regional finals Sweet Sixteen; March 12
1	Lubbock Christian	56
2	West Texas A&M	53

=== West Regional ===
- Site: Azusa, California (Azusa Pacific)

Regional Quarterfinals; Round of 64; March 9
1	Azusa Pacific	60
8	Humboldt State	66
4	Northwest Nazarene	63
5	Alaska-Anchorage	65
2	Hawaii Pacific	65
7	Montana State-Billings	76
3	UC San Diego	64
6	Seattle Pacific	51

Regional semifinals Round of 32; March 10
8	Humboldt State	73
5	Alaska-Anchorage	81
7	Montana State-Billings	75
3	UC San Diego	73

Regional finals Sweet Sixteen; March 12
5	Alaska-Anchorage	70
7	Montana State-Billings	71

=== Finals ===
Quarterfinals, semifinals and finals were hosted at the Sanford Pentagon in Sioux Falls, South Dakota.

Quarterfinals; Elite Eight; March 19
MW1	Ashland	91
W7	Montana State-Billings	73
E1	Stonehill	71
A1	Indiana (PA)	75
SE1	Lubbock Christian	62
C2	Central Missouri	72
SE1	Carson-Newman	70
S1	Union (TN)	73

Semifinals; Final Four; March 21
MW1	Ashland	92
A1	Indiana (PA)	68
C2	Central Missouri	70
S1	Union (TN)	57

Finals; Championship Game; March 23
MW1	Ashland	52
C2	Central Missouri	66

== See also ==
- 2018 NCAA Division I women's basketball tournament
- 2018 NCAA Division III women's basketball tournament
- 2018 NAIA Division I women's basketball tournament
- 2018 NAIA Division II women's basketball tournament
- 2018 NCAA Division II men's basketball tournament
