= North Georgia Nighthawks =

Intercollegiate sports teams of University of North Georgia

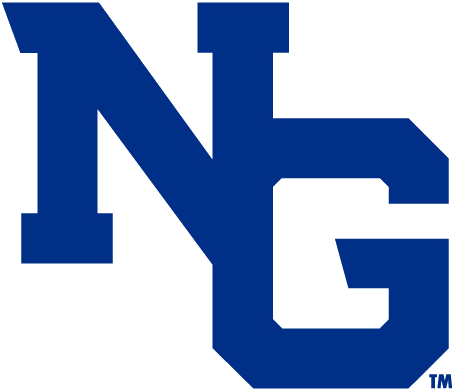
- University: University of North Georgia
- Conference: Peach Belt (primary); SoCon (rifle)
- NCAA: Division II
- Athletic director: Mary Rob Plunkett
- Location: Dahlonega, Georgia
- Varsity teams: 13 (5 men's, 7 women's, 1 co-ed)
- Basketball arena: Lynn Cottrell Arena at the UNG Convocation Center
- Baseball stadium: Bob Stein Stadium
- Softball stadium: Haines & Carolyn Hill Stadium
- Soccer stadium: UNG Soccer Field
- Golf course: Achasta Golf Club (Dahlonega, GA); Chattahoochee Golf Club (Gainesville, GA)
- Tennis venue: UNG Tennis Complex at Yahoola Creek Park
- Other venues: Colonel Raymond C. Hamilton Rifle Range
- Mascot: Nigel the Nighthawk
- Nickname: Nighthawks
- Colors: Blue and gold
- Website: ungathletics.com

Team NCAA championships
- 2

Individual and relay NCAA champions
- 2

The North Georgia Nighthawks (or UNG Nighthawks) are the athletic teams that represent the University of North Georgia (formed after the merger of North Georgia College & State University (NGCSU) and Gainesville State College in 2013), located in Dahlonega, Georgia, in intercollegiate sports at the Division II level of the National Collegiate Athletic Association (NCAA), primarily competing in the Peach Belt Conference since the 2005–06 academic year. North Georgia's rifle team competes at the Division I level as affiliate members of the Southern Conference (SoCon).

North Georgia competes in thirteen intercollegiate varsity sports. Men's sports include baseball, basketball, golf, soccer, and tennis; women's sports include basketball, cross country, golf, soccer, softball, tennis, and track and field; and the rifle team is co-ed.

== History ==
The merged school inherited the athletic legacy of NGCSU, which competed under the nickname "Saints" with a mascot of a Saint Bernard. Following the merger in 2013, the school's nickname was changed to the "Nighthawks," to help unify the merging schools. Before joining the NCAA and the Peach Belt Conference, North Georgia competed in the National Association of Intercollegiate Athletics (NAIA) from 1970 to 2005.

== Conference affiliations ==
NAIA

- Southern States Athletic Conference (1999–2005)

NCAA

- Peach Belt Conference (2005–present)

== National Championships ==
The Nighthawks have won two team NCAA national championships, both in Softball (2015, 2023).

North Georgia has had two Nighthawks win an NCAA individual championship at the Division II level:

Women's Track & Field (1): 2021 (Journey Gurley, Pole Vault)

Men’s Golf (1): 2025 (Hunter Smith)

=== Team ===
Sport	Association	Division	Year	Opponent/Runner-up	Score
Softball (2)	NCAA (2)	Division II (2)	2015	Dixie State	4–0
Softball (2)	NCAA (2)	Division II (2)	2023	Grand Valley State	2–0

== Varsity Teams ==
UNG competes in 13 intercollegiate varsity sports: Men's sports include baseball, basketball, golf, soccer and tennis; while women's sports include basketball, cross country, golf, soccer, softball, tennis and track & field; and mixed sports include rifle.

=== Baseball ===
UNG's baseball facility was constructed in 2008 for the former North Georgia College and State University. In 2010, it was dedicated to former NGCSU alumnus and baseball player Bob Stein, who donated much of the funds used in the construction of the field. The UNG baseball team is a member of the Peach Belt Conference. Coach Tom Cantrell is in his 25th season (2024) at the helm of the Nighthawks baseball program, having coached the team since it was relaunched in 2000. Coach Cantrell won the Peach Belt Conference Coach of the Year in 2007, 2015, 2017 and 2019. Cantrell is assisted by Kane Keith and Nick Palmer.

=== Softball ===
The University of North Georgia softball team was founded in 1997. It is the only program at North Georgia to have won a National Championship in either the NAIA or the NCAA, having twice won the NCAA Division II Softball Championship - in 2015 in Oklahoma City and in 2023 in Chattanooga. Coach Ricky Sanders launched the softball program, coaching for four seasons until 2000, which was also the year Sanders and the team won the NAIA Regional Tournament. The softball team has competed as a member of the Peach Belt Conference since 2006 in NCAA Division II. Their other accomplishments include 15 NCAA Tournament appearances, 12 NCAA Super Regional appearances, and 8 NCAA Division II Championship appearances, including the school's first-ever National Championship in 2015 and a second National Championship in 2023. UNG has won 12 Peach Belt Conference regular season titles and a matching 12 PBC Tournament titles. Mike Davenport has been the head coach of the program since 2001, with a winning percentage of .796 in that time. In the summer of 2015, after leading UNG to its first national championship, Davenport served as head coach of the National Pro Fastpitch league's USSSA Florida Pride, leading the Pride to the regular season NPF title and a runner-up finish in the Cowles Cup. He served as the last head coach of legendary pitcher Cat Osterman, who retired at the end of the 2015 season. Haines & Carolyn Hill Stadium, also known as "The Hill," was constructed during the fall of 2008 on UNG's Dahlonega campus. In 2014, Hill Stadium received a major upgrade with the installation of FieldTurf artificial playing surface in both the infield and outfield, allowing the team to practice regardless of the North Georgia climate which can feature heavy rains in the spring and occasional snow from late fall through early spring.

=== Men's Basketball ===
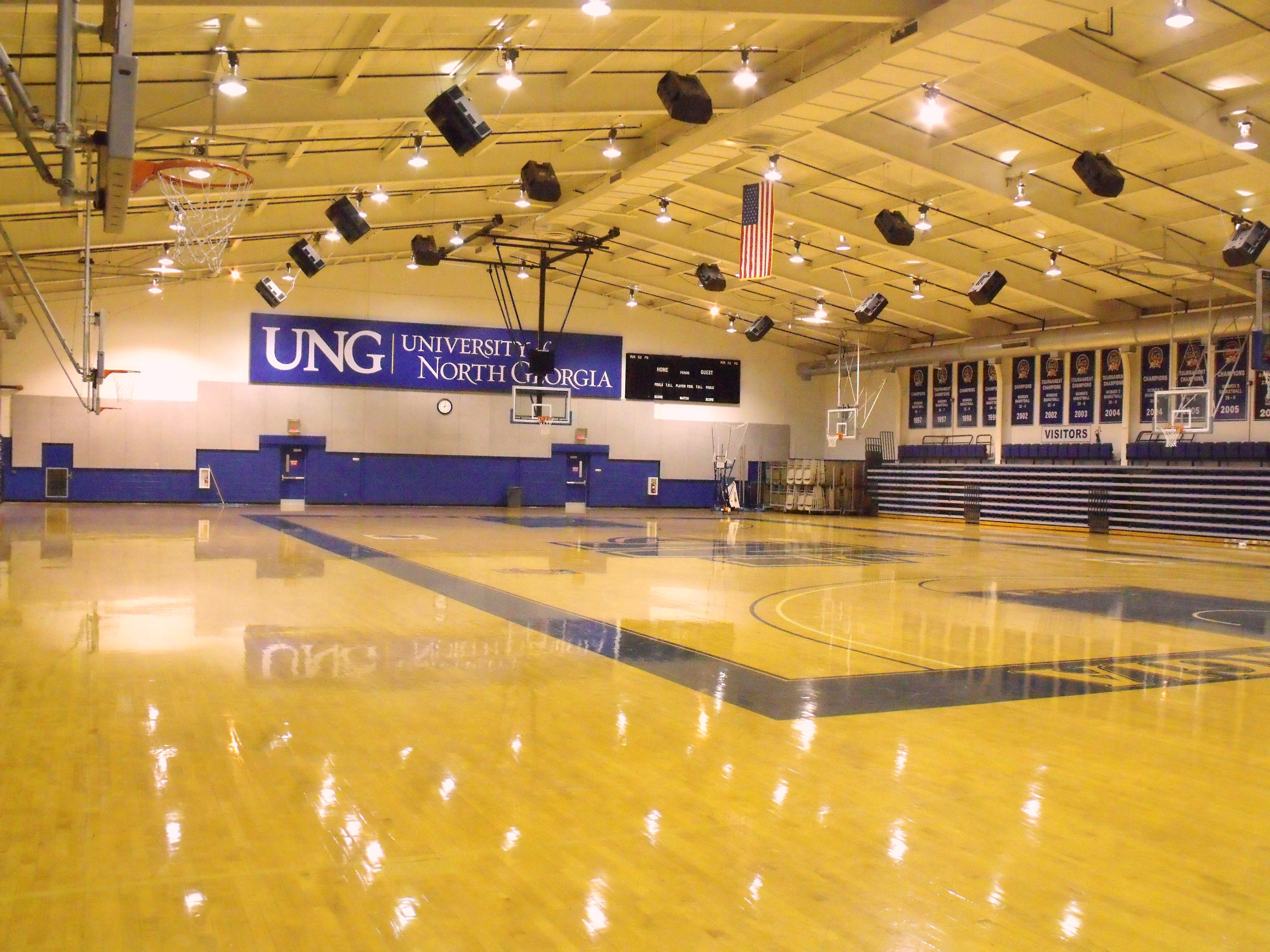
Memorial Hall Gym basketball court

In 1971, the men's basketball team was established. Bill Ensley was the first person to coach this team. Since 2006, the team has competed in the Peach Belt Conference as an NCAA Division II member. In 2023, the Nighthawks made their first NCAA Division II Tournament appearance. Prior to being an NCAA Division II member, the team competed as an NAIA member in the Southern States Athletic Conference. The Nighthawks are currently coached by Dan Evans, who was named the fourth coach in the storied history of the program in April, 2019. Evans is assisted by Adam Blake and Ben Casanova. The Men's Basketball Operations Assistant is Hannah Perkins.

=== Women's Basketball ===
The University of North Georgia's women's basketball team (also known as the Nighthawks), created in 1971, was first coached by Linda Caruthers. The team competed as a NAIA member until 2005. It is currently in its 44th season competing in the Peach Belt Conference as an NCAA Division II member. The current coach, Buffie Burson, has been coaching the Women's Basketball team for the 29 seasons since 1994. The Nighthawks claimed the title of the Peach Belt Conference Regular Season Champions in 2006, 2018, 2019 and 2022. The Nighthawks won the PBC Tournament in 2018, 2019, 2021 and 2022. In 2019, the team reached the NCAA Elite 8 and made the National Semifinal in 2022. Coach Burson is assisted by Amber Skidgel, along with Student Assistants Cooper Turner and Ella Holbrook.

=== Women's Cross Country ===
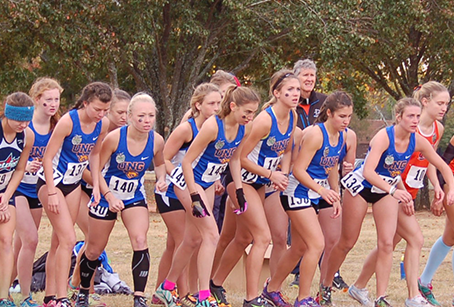
Women's Cross Country

The University of North Georgia's women's cross country team has been competing for the college since 1996. Tom Williams, Amanda Harris, Jason Gibson, Chris Busby, and Gary Stiner founded and lead the team throughout this season, and the program has been active up until 2009. In 2010 and 2011, the women's cross country team did not compete, but it was reinstated for intercollegiate competition in 2012. Until the year 2006, North Georgia was an NAIA member of the Southern States Athletic Conference, otherwise known as the Georgia Alabama Carolina Conference. During the seasons of 2005–2007, the women's cross country team transitioned to the NCAA Division II. Since then, they have competed at the Peach Belt Conference, and they nationally appeared in the NCAA Division II in 2014.

=== Men's and Women's Tennis ===
Both the UNG men's and women's tennis teams are coached by Kent Norsworthy. He has been coaching both teams for 19 seasons at UNG. Norsworthy is assisted by Justin Miles. Men's Tennis has made 9 NCAA Tournament appearances, including the Sweet 16 in 2016 and 2021. Women's Tennis has made 6 NCAA Tournament appearances, including the Sweet 16 in 2018 and the Elite 8 in 2019.

=== Men's and Women's Golf ===
The UNG golf programs got their start in 2009 with the men being coached by Tom Fowler and the women coached by Leigh Anne Hunter. Fowler was followed in 2018 by Bryson Worley and in 2019 Sierra Campbell became the second coach of the women's program. Matt Elliott was an NCAA Regional Qualifier in 2017 and Logan Archer followed in 2018 qualifying for the NCAA Regional. The Nighthawk men have qualified for the NCAA Regional in 2021, 2022 and 2023 finishing 12th, 11th and 11th respectively. For the women, Megan Sabol was a regional qualifier in 2018 and 2021 and Maddie Ananthasane was a national qualifier in 2021 and a regional qualifier in 2022 and 2023. UNG Golf hosts the annual LeeAnn Noble Memorial Golf Tournament which is held in memory of a former member of the UNG women's golf team who died in 2014. The tournament is held at the Achasta Golf Club in Dahlonega, Georgia - home of the UNG golf programs.

=== Rifle ===
The UNG mixed rifle team is coached by head coach Tori Kostecki. The rifle team, the only UNG team that does not compete in the Peach Belt (due to the conference not sponsoring rifle), was previously a member of the Southeast Air Rifle Conference but became an associate member of the Division I Southern Conference in 2016–17. The team participated in the April 2014 USA Shooting Junior Olympic National Championship. The school's rifle facility is the Col. Raymond C. Hamilton Rifle Range and is part of the Military Leadership Center on the North Georgia Dahlonega campus.

=== Women's Track & Field ===
Track & Field was added as a women's sport for the Nighthawks in 2017. In the first four years of the program, coached by Tom Williams, the UNG women had 4 Peach Belt Conference Champions with Brittany Truitt winning the 800 in 2017 and the 1500 in 2018. In 2018 and 2019, Abigail Kirkland was the 400M Hurdles conference champion. In 2021, Coach Chris England took over the program. He added PBC Conference Champions in 2021 with Bree Hammond (5000, Steeplechase), Abigail Kirkland (200, 400) and Journey Gurley (Pole Vault). Gurley would repeat her conference championship in 2022 and go on to win the NCAA Division II Pole Vault Championship, becoming UNG's first and only individual national champion.

== Notable alumni ==
=== Men's Basketball ===
- Garland F. Pinholster
- Juan Ramón Rivas Castillo
- Montez Robinson

=== Women's Basketball ===
- Brenda Paul

=== Women's Soccer ===
- Jade Pennock

=== Baseball ===
- Troy Snitker
