= Glenville State Pioneers =

Intercollegiate athletic program of Glenville State University

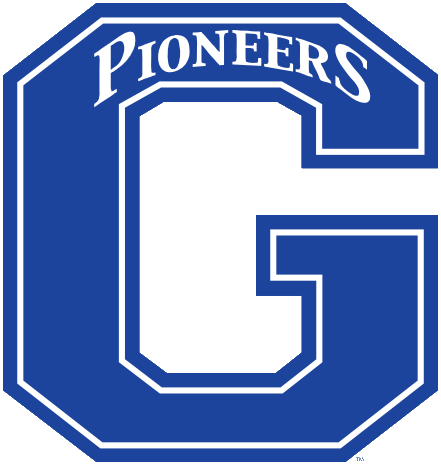
- University: Glenville State University
- Nickname: Pioneers
- NCAA: Division II
- Conference: Mountain East
- Athletic director: Jesse Skiles
- Location: Glenville, West Virginia
- Varsity teams: 18
- Football stadium: I.L. & Sue Morris Stadium
- Basketball arena: Waco Center
- Baseball stadium: Sue Morris Sports Complex
- Colors: Royal blue and white
- Marching band: GSU Marching Band
- Website: gstatepioneers.com

Team NCAA championships
- 1

The Glenville State Pioneers are the athletic teams that represent Glenville State University, located in Glenville, West Virginia, in NCAA Division II intercollegiate sports. The Pioneers compete as members of the Mountain East Conference for all 18 varsity sports.

== Varsity teams ==
=== List of teams ===
Men's sports (8)

- Baseball
- Basketball
- Boxing
- Cross Country
- Football
- Golf
- Track and field
- Wrestling

Women's sports (10)

- Acrobatics & Tumbling
- Basketball
- Boxing
- Cheerleading
- Cross Country
- Golf
- Soccer
- Softball
- Track and field
- Volleyball

== National championships ==
=== NCAA team championships ===
- Women's (1):
  - Basketball (1): 2022
