= 2020 NCAA Division II women's basketball tournament =

Cancelled college basketball tournament

- Teams: 64
- Finals site: Birmingham CrossPlex, Birmingham, Alabama
- Canceled due to COVID-19 pandemic

The 2020 NCAA Division II women's basketball tournament was due to be the 39th annual tournament hosted by the NCAA to determine the national champion of Division II women's collegiate basketball in the United States. The tournament, however, was cancelled due to the COVID-19 pandemic and no champion was crowned for the 2019–20 season.

The championship rounds were scheduled for the Birmingham CrossPlex in Birmingham, Alabama.

== Bracket ==
=== Atlantic Regional ===
- Site: Indiana, Pennsylvania (Indiana (PA))

First round
Indiana (PA)
Fayetteville State
Bowie State
Virginia Union
Glenville State
Notre Dame (OH)
Gannon
California (PA)

Regional semifinals

Regional finals

=== South Regional ===
- Site: Cleveland, Tennessee (Lee)

First round
Lee
Alabama-Huntsville
Delta State
Eckerd
Tampa
Benedict
Union (TN)
Florida Southern

Regional semifinals

Regional finals

=== Central Regional ===
- Site: Warrensburg, Missouri (Central Missouri)

First round
Central Missouri
Southwestern Oklahoma State
Emporia State
Southeastern Oklahoma State
Sioux Falls
St. Cloud State
Minnesota-Duluth
Fort Hays State

Regional semifinals

Regional finals

=== Midwest Regional ===
- Site: O'Reilly Family Event Center, Springfield, Missouri (Drury)

First round
Drury
Lindenwood
Grand Valley State
Ferris State
Walsh
Lewis
Ashland
Southern Indiana

Regional semifinals

Regional finals

=== East Regional ===
- Site: Garden City, New York (Adelphi)

First round
Adelphi
Jefferson
USciences
Molloy
St. Anselm
Le Moyne
Stonehill
Daemen

Regional semifinals

Regional finals

=== Southeast Regional ===
- Site: Greenwood, South Carolina (Lander)

First round
Lander
Limestone
Tusculum
Belmont Abbey
Anderson (SC)
Carson-Newman
North Georgia
Clayton State

Regional semifinals

Regional finals

=== South Central Regional ===
- Site: Lubbock, Texas (Lubbock Christian)

First round
Lubbock Christian
Angelo State
Colorado Mesa
Westminster (UT)
West Texas A&M
Western Colorado
Texas A&M-Commerce
Eastern New Mexico

Regional semifinals

Regional finals

=== West Regional ===
- Site: Honolulu, Hawaii (Hawaii Pacific)

First round
Hawaii Pacific
Cal Poly Pomona
Cal State San Marcos
Azusa Pacific
UC-San Diego
Northwest Nazarene
Alaska Anchorage
Western Washington

Regional semifinals

Regional finals

== See also ==
- 2020 NCAA Division I women's basketball tournament
- 2020 NCAA Division III women's basketball tournament
- 2020 NAIA Division I women's basketball tournament
- 2020 NAIA Division II women's basketball tournament
- 2020 NCAA Division II men's basketball tournament
