= Drury Panthers =

Athletic teams of Drury University

- University: Drury University
- Conference: GLVC (primary)
- NCAA: Division II
- Athletic director: Nyla Milleson
- Location: Springfield, Missouri
- Varsity teams: 29 (13 men's, 15 women's, 1 co-ed)
- Basketball arena: O'Reilly Family Event Center
- Nickname: Panthers
- Colors: Scarlet and gray
- Website: drurypanthers.com
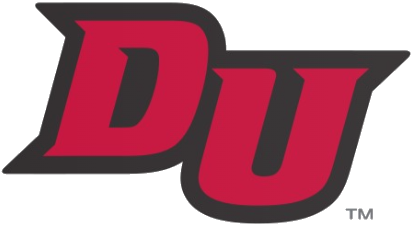

The Drury Panthers are the athletic teams that represent Drury University, located in Springfield, Missouri, in NCAA Division II intercollegiate sports. The Panthers compete as members of the Great Lakes Valley Conference for all 21 varsity sports. Drury has been a member of the GLVC since 2005.

== Varsity teams ==
Men's sports	Men's sports
Baseball	Basketball
Basketball	Bowling
Cross country	Cross country
Golf	Golf
Soccer	Soccer
Swimming	Softball
Tennis	Swimming
Track and field^{1}	Tennis
Wrestling	Track and field^{1}
	Volleyball
^{1} – includes both indoor and outdoor

== National championships ==
The Panthers have twenty-three NCAA team national championships, the fourth-most among active Division II athletics program (Saint Augustine's, Adams State, and Florida Southern have more).

=== Team ===
Sport	Association	Division	Year	Opponent	Score
Men's basketball (1)	NCAA	Division II	2013	Metro State	74–73
Men's swimming and diving (22)	NAIA (10)	Single	1981	Denver; Simon Fraser	483–304
Men's swimming and diving (22)	NAIA (10)	Single	1982	Denver	456–301
Men's swimming and diving (22)	NAIA (10)	Single	1985	Central Washington	368–350
Men's swimming and diving (22)	NAIA (10)	Single	1988	Wisconsin–Eau Claire	494–329.5
Men's swimming and diving (22)	NAIA (10)	Single	1989	Puget Sound	632.5–410.5
Men's swimming and diving (22)	NAIA (10)	Single	1990	Wisconsin–Stevens Point	634–376
Men's swimming and diving (22)	NAIA (10)	Single	1991	Oral Roberts	631.5–630
Men's swimming and diving (22)	NAIA (10)	Single	1992	Simon Fraser	779.5–493
Men's swimming and diving (22)	NAIA (10)	Single	1993	Puget Sound	602.5–487
Men's swimming and diving (22)	NAIA (10)	Single	1994	Puget Sound	813.5–507
Men's swimming and diving (22)	NCAA (12)	Division II	1999	Cal State Bakersfield	829–557
Men's swimming and diving (22)	NCAA (12)	Division II	2003	Cal State Bakersfield	612–535
Men's swimming and diving (22)	NCAA (12)	Division II	2005	Cal State Bakersfield	726–480
Men's swimming and diving (22)	NCAA (12)	Division II	2006	Cal State Bakersfield	649–543½
Men's swimming and diving (22)	NCAA (12)	Division II	2007	North Dakota	521½–500
Men's swimming and diving (22)	NCAA (12)	Division II	2008	Missouri S&T	523½–336
Men's swimming and diving (22)	NCAA (12)	Division II	2009	Wayne State	543–504½
Men's swimming and diving (22)	NCAA (12)	Division II	2010	Incarnate Word	538–403
Men's swimming and diving (22)	NCAA (12)	Division II	2011	UC San Diego	600½–345
Men's swimming and diving (22)	NCAA (12)	Division II	2012	UC San Diego	473–400
Men's swimming and diving (22)	NCAA (12)	Division II	2013	Florida Southern	546–397
Men's swimming and diving (22)	NCAA (12)	Division II	2014	Florida Southern	569½–361
Women's swimming and diving (13)	NAIA (3)	Single	1992	Puget Sound	621–583
Women's swimming and diving (13)	NAIA (3)	Single	1993	Puget Sound	637–630.5
Women's swimming and diving (13)	NAIA (3)	Single	1994	Puget Sound	726–576
Women's swimming and diving (13)	NCAA (10)	Division II	1997	Oakland	690½–460
Women's swimming and diving (13)	NCAA (10)	Division II	1998	Cal State Bakersfield	578½–386
Women's swimming and diving (13)	NCAA (10)	Division II	1999	North Dakota	613–603½
Women's swimming and diving (13)	NCAA (10)	Division II	2000	Truman State	663–556
Women's swimming and diving (13)	NCAA (10)	Division II	2007	Truman State	646½–518
Women's swimming and diving (13)	NCAA (10)	Division II	2009	Wayne State	618½–453½
Women's swimming and diving (13)	NCAA (10)	Division II	2010	Wayne State	657–531
Women's swimming and diving (13)	NCAA (10)	Division II	2011	Wayne State	483½–388
Women's swimming and diving (13)	NCAA (10)	Division II	2013	Wayne State	432½–388
Women's swimming and diving (13)	NCAA (10)	Division II	2014	Wayne State	486–419

== Individual teams ==
=== Baseball ===
Baseball, in hiatus since the 1970s, was reorganized for the 2007 season by new head coach Mark Stratton. Bill Virdon was the first Panther to make a start. Trevor Richards was the first alum to pitch a Major League Baseball win, for the Miami Marlins. The team plays home games at U.S. Baseball Park in nearby Ozark, Missouri.

=== Basketball ===
Mike Carter played for the Drury Panthers, who in 1978–79 were 33–2 and won the National Association of Intercollegiate Athletics national championship as he won the 1979 NAIA basketball tournament's Charles Stevenson Hustle Award, and who over his two seasons with the team were 62–6. He holds the school's two-year record in rebounds (480). He was inducted into the Drury Panthers Hall of Fame in 2008.

On April 7, 2013, Drury won the Division II Men's National Championship in Basketball, defeating Metro State of Denver 74–73 after rallying from a 17-point deficit. The Panthers won their final 23 games of the season – a school record – to finish 31–4 on the season. They also captured their second Great Lakes Valley Conference championship and first NCAA Division II Midwest Regional along the way. In keeping with recent custom, the Division II champions were invited to play an exhibition game against Duke University.

On June 24, 2021, Drury announced former NBA player Chris Carr will join the Panthers coaching staff as an assistant.

=== Swimming and diving ===
Also in 2007, Drury men's swimming head coach Brian Reynolds was inducted into the Missouri Sports Hall of Fame.

=== Wrestling ===
In 2016, Drury began fielding a wrestling program, the first in the Ozarks region in over 20 years. The addition gave the GLVC the required minimum of six teams to hold a conference championship tournament, and it added the sport in the 2016–17 season.
