= Lubbock Christian Chaparrals and Lady Chaps =

- University: Lubbock Christian University
- Conference: LSC (primary)
- NCAA: Division II
- Athletic director: Andrew Sorrells
- Location: Lubbock, Texas
- Varsity teams: 17 (7 men's, 8 women's, 2 co-ed)
- Basketball arena: Rip Griffin Center
- Baseball stadium: Hays Field
- Softball stadium: Maner Park
- Soccer stadium: LCU Soccer and Track Facility
- Nickname: Chaparrals (men); Lady Chaps (women)
- Colors: Blue and white
- Website: lcuchaps.com

The Lubbock Christian Chaparrals and Lady Chaps (also LCU Chaparrals and LCU Chaps) are the athletic teams that represent Lubbock Christian University, located in Lubbock, Texas, in intercollegiate sports as a member of the NCAA Division II ranks, primarily competing in the Lone Star Conference (LSC) since the 2019–20 academic year. The Chaparrals and Lady Chaps previously had competed in the D-II Heartland Conference from 2013–14 to 2018–19; in the Sooner Athletic Conference (SAC) of the National Association of Intercollegiate Athletics (NAIA) from 1994–95 to 2012–13; and in the Texas Intercollegiate Athletic Association (TIAA) of the NCAA Division III ranks from 1979–80 to 1981–82.

== Varsity teams ==
Lubbock Christian competes in 17 intercollegiate varsity sports: Men's sports include baseball, basketball, cross country, golf, soccer, tennis and track & field; while women's sports include basketball, cross country, golf, soccer, softball, tennis, track & field and volleyball; and co-ed sports include cheerleading and eSports.

== National championships ==
=== Men's Cross Country ===
Sport	Association	Division	Year	Opponent/Runner-up	Score
Men's cross country (8)	NAIA	—	1990	Adams State	33–57
Men's cross country (8)	NAIA	—	1991	Adams State	26–42
Men's cross country (8)	NAIA	—	1992	Hillsdale	33–94
Men's cross country (8)	NAIA	—	1993	Simon Fraser	24–61
Men's cross country (8)	NAIA	—	1994	Hillsdale	21–120
Men's cross country (8)	NAIA	—	1995	Life	17–66
Men's cross country (8)	NAIA	—	1996	Life	30–79
Men's cross country (8)	NAIA	—	1997	Life	40–80

=== Baseball ===
Sport	Association	Division	Year	Opponent/Runner-up	Score
Baseball (2)	NAIA	—	1983	Lewis-Clark	12–4
Baseball (2)	NAIA	—	2009	Point Loma Nazarene University	11–4

=== Women’s Basketball ===
Sport	Association	Division	Year	Opponent/Runner-up	Score
Women's basketball (3)	NCAA	DII	2016	University of Alaska Anchorage	78–73
Women's basketball (3)	NCAA	DII	2019	Southwestern Oklahoma State	95–85
Women's basketball (3)	NCAA	DII	2021	Drury University	69–59

=== Softball ===
Sport	Association	Division	Year	Opponent/Runner-up	Score
Softball (1)	NAIA	—	2008	University of Mobile	2–1

== Individual teams ==
=== Baseball ===
The Chaparrals baseball team has won the NAIA World Series in 1983 and 2009, and came in second in 2011.

=== Basketball ===
Lady Chaparral Basketball competed in the NAIA tournament championship game in 2006, the quarterfinals in 2008 and the Fab Four in 2012.

2016

In their first year eligible for NCAA postseason play, the Lady Chaps advanced to the 2016 NCAA Division II women's basketball championship game. On April 4, 2016, the Lady Chaps defeated the Alaska Anchorage Seawolves 78–73 to win their first national championship.

2018

The Lady Chaps have since advanced to the DII Women's Elite Eight in

2019

Lubbock Christian University's Maddi Chitsey nailed a three-pointer with 2.5 seconds left to force the first-ever double overtime contest in the history of the NCAA Division II title game, and the No.5-seed Lady Chaparrals outscored No.2-seed Southwestern Oklahoma State 20–10 in the second overtime to pull off a 95–85 upset win for their third upset-win of the tournament and their second NCAA Division II national championship title in program history.

Steve Gomez

Coach Steve Gomez was named the 2016 United States Marine Corps/WBCA NCAA Division II National Coach of the Year.

=== Softball ===
Lady Chaparral Softball won the NAIA National Championship in 2008, in their first season of competition.
