= List of University of Mount Union people =

This is a list of people associated with University of Mount Union, a four-year, private, coeducational, liberal arts college in Alliance, Ohio.

== Alumni ==
=== Arts ===
- Carrie Coon - Tony-nominated actress for her role on Broadway in the Steppenwolf revival of Who's Afraid of Virginia Woolf?; also nominated for Best Supporting Actress in the movie Gone Girl
- DW (Dave) Drouillard - vocalist, songwriter and musician
- David Dusing - tenor, composer, arranger, and conductor
- Agnes Thomas Morris - Shakespeare promoter, president of War Mothers of America
- Will Lamartine Thompson - writer and composer of "Softly and Tenderly, Jesus is Calling"

=== Athletics ===
- Jim Ballard - former Mount Union quarterback; member of the College Football Hall of Fame; quarterback in the Arena Football League, Canadian Football League, and NFL Europe; Commissioner of the American Indoor Football League
- Paul Bixler - former head football coach at Ohio State University and Colgate University
- Zac Bruney - head football coach for Wheeling Cardinals football
- Kevin Burke - running backs coach for UC Davis Aggies football
- Matt Campbell - head football coach of Penn State Nittany Lions football
- Jason Candle - head football coach of Toledo Rockets football
- Dom Capers - former defensive back of the Mount Union Purple Raiders; former NFL head coach for the Carolina Panthers and Houston Texans; current defensive assistant for the Jacksonville Jaguars
- Matt Caponi - defensive coordinator for North Texas Mean Green football
- Dick Crum - head football coach for Miami University, North Carolina and Kent State University
- Sean Donnelly - post-collegiate / professional hammer thrower
- Brett Ekkens - head football coach for Tiffin Dragons football
- Wilmer Fleming - halfback for the NFL's Canton Bulldogs
- Pierre Garçon - American football wide receiver, drafted by the Indianapolis Colts in the 2008 NFL draft, 205th overall; FA signed to Washington Redskins 2012
- Alex Grinch - safeties coach for Wisconsin Badgers football
- Mike Hallett - co-offensive coordinator and offensive line coach for Toledo Rockets football
- Bill Herman - professional basketball player for the Denver Nuggets
- Charlie Joachim - basketball player
- Larry Kehres - highest winning percentage as a head coach in college football (all divisions) - 303-23-3/.925
- Vince Kehres - defensive coordinator for Toledo Rockets football
- Nate Kmic - American football running back, all-time NCAA rushing leader with 8,074 yards
- Frank Lauterbur - head football coach for the University of Toledo
- Ron Lynn - assistant football coach, Stanford University
- Tom Manning - tight ends coach for the Indianapolis Colts
- Harry March - NFL executive; second American Football League founder; medical doctor for the pre-NFL Canton Bulldogs; New York Giants executive; professional football historian and promoter; author of Pro Football: Its Ups and Downs
- Erik Raeburn - head football coach at Gannon University
- Jay Sawvel - American football coach; current head football coach of the University of Wyoming
- Cecil Shorts III - football wide receiver, drafted by the Jacksonville Jaguars in the 2011 NFL draft, 114th overall
- Mike Sirianni - head football coach for Washington & Jefferson Presidents football
- Nick Sirianni - current head coach of the Philadelphia Eagles; Super Bowl LIX champion
- LeRoy Sprankle - high school sports coach and athletics advocate in Eastern Tennessee and South Florida; the "father of East Tennessee sports"
- E. J. Stewart - former college football coach' professional football player-coach' general manager and founder of the Ohio League's Massillon Tigers
- Ed Warinner - run game coordinator for Florida Atlantic Owls football

=== Business ===
- Vincent Marotta - business executive and co-creator of Mr. Coffee
- Susan McGalla - former president of American Eagle Outfitters; former chief executive officer of Wet Seal

=== Communication ===
- Antonietta "Toni" Gonzalez-Collins - SportsCenter news anchor for ESPN
- Raymond C. Hoiles - newspaper publisher
- Chip Mosher - newspaper columnist; high school "Educator of Distinction;" poet
- Jeff Shreve - public address announcer and broadcaster

=== Education ===
- Bowman Foster Ashe - first president of the University of Miami
- Victor Boschini - current chancellor of Texas Christian University
- Henry Solomon Lehr - founder, Ohio Northern University

=== Medical ===
- Charles Armstrong - virologist, physician in the U.S. Public Health Service
- Richard Drake - professor of surgery Cleveland Clinic, Lerner College of Medicine
- Shuvo Roy - Bangladeshi-American scientist and engineer; co-inventor of the world's first implantable artificial kidney

=== Politics and law ===
- Thomas H. Anderson - United States federal judge
- De Witt C. Badger - U.S. congressman from Ohio
- Christopher A. Boyko - United States federal judge
- Allen Foster Cooper - U.S. congressman from Pennsylvania
- Larry Cox - former executive director of Amnesty International USA
- David Hollingsworth - U.S. congressman from Ohio; an organizer of the Ohio State bar association, serving as its chairman in 1908
- Lyman U. Humphrey - 11th governor of Kansas
- Samuel Austin Kendall - U.S. congressman from Pennsylvania
- James R. Knepp II - United States district judge
- Philander Knox - attorney general of the United States in the cabinets of Presidents William McKinley and Theodore Roosevelt; senator of Pennsylvania; United States secretary of state for President William Howard Taft
- William McKinley - 25th president of the United States
- C. Ellis Moore - U.S. congressman from Ohio
- Miner G. Norton - U.S. congressman from Ohio
- Scott Oelslager - U.S. congressman from Ohio
- Ralph Regula - U.S. congressman from Ohio
- Tim Schaffer - U.S. congressman from Ohio
- Brian L. Stafford - 20th director of the United States Secret Service
- W. Aubrey Thomas - U.S. congressman from Ohio

=== Religion ===
- James Midwinter Freeman - clergyman and writer
- John William Hamilton - bishop of the Methodist Episcopal Church
- Francis Enmer Kearns - bishop of the Methodist Church and the United Methodist Church
- Charles Bayard Mitchell - bishop of the Methodist Episcopal Church
- Wesley Matthias Stanford - bishop of the United Evangelical Church

=== Science ===
- Mary Jobe Akeley - 1897 graduate of Scio College, explorer, photographer, and author of several books about her expeditions
- Angela Neal-Barnett - first African-American tenured professor in the department of psychology at Kent State University
- Shuvo Roy - professor, Department of Bioengineering and Therapeutic Science, University of California, San Francisco; director, the Kidney Project
- Lorin B. Sebrell - Goodyear research director noted for his work on organic accelerators for vulcanization

=== Writing ===
- Jean E. Karl - book editor who founded and led the children's division, young adult, and science fiction imprints at Atheneum Books; oversaw/edited books that won two Caldecott medals and five Newbery Medals
- Joseph Amasa Munk - wrote about the history of Arizona; works included Arizona Sketches (1905), Arizona Bibliography: Private Collection of Arizoniana (1908), Southwest Sketches (1920), Activities of a Lifetime (1924), History of Arizona Literature (1925), and Story of the Munk Library of Arizoniana (1927)

=== Other ===
- Annie W. Clark - temperance activist
- Ed Fishel - National Security Agency

== Notable faculty ==
- De Scott Evans - 19th-century artist, former head of Mount Union art department
