= Mountain East Conference women's basketball tournament =

- Conference basketball championship
- Sport: Basketball
- Conference: Mountain East Conference
- Number of teams: 10
- Format: Single-elimination tournament
- Current stadium: WesBanco Arena
- Current location: Wheeling, WV
- Played: 2014–present
- Current champion: Charleston (3rd)
- Most championships: Glenville State (5)
- Official website: MEC women's basketball

Host stadiums
- WesBanco Arena (2019-present); Charleston Civic Center (2014–2018)

Host locations
- Wheeling, WV (2019-present); Charleston, WV(2014–2018)

The Mountain East Conference women's basketball tournament is the annual conference women's basketball championship tournament for the Mountain East Conference. The tournament has been held annually since the MEC's establishment in 2013, with the first tournament taking place in 2014. It is a single-elimination tournament and seeding is based on regular season records.

From 2014 to 2018, the tournament was hosted by the Charleston Civic Center in Charleston, West Virginia. Following several years of low attendance, the league announced it would move the event to the Wheeling Civic Center in Wheeling.

The winner receives the MEC's automatic bid to the NCAA Division II women's basketball tournament.

== Results ==
Year	Champions	Score	Runner-up	Venue
2014	Glenville State	74–50	Charleston (WV)	Charleston Civic Center Coliseum (Charleston, WV)
2015	West Liberty	76–55	Notre Dame (OH)	Charleston Civic Center Coliseum (Charleston, WV)
2016	Wheeling Jesuit	70–66	West Liberty	Charleston Civic Center Coliseum (Charleston, WV)
2017	Wheeling Jesuit	80–61	Fairmont State	Charleston Civic Center Coliseum (Charleston, WV)
2018	Glenville State	81–77	Notre Dame (OH)	Charleston Civic Center Coliseum (Charleston, WV)
2019	Glenville State	78–69	Charleston (WV)	WesBanco Arena (Wheeling, WV)
2020	Glenville State	80–75	Notre Dame (OH)	WesBanco Arena (Wheeling, WV)
2021	Charleston	87–80	Glenville State	WesBanco Arena (Wheeling, WV)
2022	Charleston	80–77	Glenville State	WesBanco Arena (Wheeling, WV)
2023	Glenville State	76–59	Charleston	WesBanco Arena (Wheeling, WV)
2024	Fairmont State	81–67	West Virginia State	WesBanco Arena (Wheeling, WV)
2025	Fairmont State	79–65	Glenville State	WesBanco Arena (Wheeling, WV)
2026	Charleston	48-43	Glenville State	WesBanco Arena (Wheeling, WV)

== Championship records ==
School	Finals Record	Finals Appearances	Years
Glenville State	5–4	9	2014, 2018, 2019, 2020, 2023
Charleston	3–3	6	2021, 2022, 2026
Fairmont State	2–1	3	2024, 2025
Wheeling (Wheeling Jesuit)	2–0	2	2016, 2017
West Liberty	1–1	2	2015
Notre Dame (OH)	0–3	3	
West Virginia State	0–1	1	

- Concord (WV), Davis & Elkins, Frostburg State, Point Park, and West Virginia Wesleyan have yet to reach a tournament final.
- Alderson Broaddus, Shepherd, Urbana, and UVA Wise never qualified for the tournament finals as MEC members.
- Schools highlighted in pink are former members of the MEC.

== See also ==
- Mountain East Conference men's basketball tournament
