= Mountain East Conference men's basketball tournament =

- Conference basketball championship
- Sport: Basketball
- Conference: Mountain East Conference
- Number of teams: 10
- Format: Single-elimination tournament
- Current stadium: WesBanco Arena
- Current location: Wheeling, WV
- Played: 2014–present
- Current champion: West Liberty (5th)
- Most championships: West Liberty (5)
- Official website: MEC men's basketball

Host stadiums
- WesBanco Arena (2019-present); Charleston Civic Center (2014–2018)

Host locations
- Wheeling, WV (2019-present); Charleston, WV(2014–2018)

The Mountain East Conference men's basketball tournament is the annual conference basketball championship tournament for the Mountain East Conference. The tournament has been held annually since the MEC's establishment in 2013, with the first tournament taking place in 2014. It is a single-elimination tournament and seeding is based on regular season records.

From 2014 to 2018, the tournament was hosted by the Charleston Civic Center in Charleston, West Virginia. Following several years of low attendance, the league announce it would move the event to the Wheeling Civic Center for at least 2019 and 2020.

The winner receives the Mountain East's automatic bid to the NCAA Division II men's basketball tournament.

== Results ==
Year	Champions	Score	Runner-up	MVP	Venue
2014	Charleston	63–60	West Liberty	Fred Simpson, Charleston	Charleston Civic Center Coliseum (Charleston, WV)
2015	Glenville State	65–58	Fairmont State	Donte Morales, Glenville State	Charleston Civic Center Coliseum (Charleston, WV)
2016	Concord	70–64	Notre Dame (OH)	Rob Reed, Concord	Charleston Civic Center Coliseum (Charleston, WV)
2017	West Liberty	67–65	Fairmont State	David Hoehn, West Liberty	Charleston Civic Center Coliseum (Charleston, WV)
2018	Wheeling Jesuit	80–65	Charleston	Haywood Highsmith, Wheeling Jesuit	Charleston Civic Center Coliseum (Charleston, WV)
2019	Notre Dame (OH)	100-96	West Liberty	Will Vorhees, Notre Dame (OH)	WesBanco Arena (Wheeling, WV)
2020	West Liberty	73–60	Charleston	Will Yoakum, West Liberty	WesBanco Arena (Wheeling, WV)
2021	Fairmont State	102–99	West Liberty	Dale Bonner, Fairmont State	WesBanco Arena (Wheeling, WV)
2022	West Liberty	70–59	Charleston (WV)	Pat Robinson III, West Liberty	WesBanco Arena (Wheeling, WV)
2023	West Liberty	112–82	Fairmont State	Bryce Butler, West Liberty	WesBanco Arena (Wheeling, WV)
2024	Charleston	78–68	West Liberty	Dwaine Jones, Charleston	WesBanco Arena (Wheeling, WV)
2025	Fairmont State	122–114 (3OT)	West Liberty	Rudy Fitzgibbons III, Fairmont State	WesBanco Arena (Wheeling, WV)
2026	West Liberty	93-88	Fairmont State	Myles Montgomery, West Liberty	WesBanco Arena (Wheeling, WV)

== Championship records ==
School	Finals Record	Finals Appearances	Years
West Liberty	5–5	10	2017, 2020, 2022, 2023, 2026
Fairmont State	2–4	6	2021, 2025
Charleston	2–3	5	2014, 2024
Notre Dame (OH)	1–1	2	2019
Wheeling (Wheeling Jesuit)	1–0	1	2018
Concord (WV)	1–0	1	2016
Glenville State	1–0	1	2015

- Alderson Broaddus, Shepherd, Urbana, and UVA Wise never qualified for the tournament finals as MEC members.
- Davis & Elkins, Frostburg State, Point Park, West Virginia State, and West Virginia Wesleyan have yet to reach a tournament final.
- Schools highlighted in pink are former members of the Mountain East Conference

== See also ==
- Mountain East Conference women's basketball tournament
