= Patrick Robinson (basketball) =

American basketball player (born 1999)

No. 15 – Liverpool Basketball
- Position: Point guard
- League: SLB

Personal information
- Born: November 15, 1999 (age 27) Chesterfield Township, New Jersey, U.S.
- Listed height: 6 ft 3 in (1.91 m)
- Listed weight: 195 lb (88 kg)

Career information
- High school: Conwell–Egan Catholic (Fairless Hills, Pennsylvania)
- College: Holy Family (2018–2019); West Liberty (2019–2022); Charleston (2022–2023)
- NBA draft: 2023: undrafted
- Playing career: 2024–present

Career history
- 2024: BC Šilutė
- 2024: KK Jahorina
- 2024–2025: UCC Demons
- 2025–2026: Cheshire Phoenix
- 2026–present: Liverpool Basketball

Career highlights
- Irish League champion (2025); SLB Most Valuable Player (2026); SLB Sixth Player of the Year (2026); Irish League Player of the Year (2025); Irish Champions Trophy Final MVP (2025); CAA Sixth Man of the Year (2023); 2× All-MEC First Team (2021, 2022); All-MEC Second Team (2020); MEC Tournament MVP (2022); CACC Rookie of the Year (2019)

Patrick Robinson III (born November 15, 1999) is an American professional basketball player for the Liverpool Basketball of the British Super League (SLB). He played college basketball for the Charleston Cougars, West Liberty Hilltoppers, and the Holy Family Tigers.

== Early life and high school career ==
Robinson is from Chesterfield Township, New Jersey, the son of Patrick and Patricia Robinson. He played high school basketball at Conwell–Egan Catholic High School in Fairless Hills, Pennsylvania. After averaging 24.3 points per game as a senior, Robinson was named to the All-Pennsylvania First Team.

== College career ==
=== Holy Family (2018–19) ===
As a freshman at Holy Family University, Robinson averaged 18.7 points per game on 55% shooting across 27 games. After the season concluded he was named CACC Rookie of the Year and received a Second Team All-CACC selection.

=== West Liberty (2019–22) ===
After transferring to West Liberty University, Robinson averaged 17.0 points per game as a sophomore, earning a spot on the All-MEC Second Team. In his junior year, Robinson averaged 20.4 points per game, and he was named to the All-MEC First Team for the first time. Despite losing the conference tournament, the Hilltoppers received an at-large bid to the 2021 NCAA Division II men's basketball tournament, making it as far as the Elite Eight.

Robinson was selected for the All-MEC First Team for a second time as a senior, after averaging 20.41 points per game while improving his defense. Robinson averaged 19.0 points per game during the 2022 MEC Tournament, leading his team to the championship and a tournament MVP selection.

=== Charleston (2022–23) ===
Robinson transferred to the College of Charleston for his graduate season. Robinson scored in double figures during every game of the 2022 Charleston Classic, and hit the game winning shot to defeat Virginia Tech 77–75 and win the tournament. On February 13, 2023, Robinson was named CAA Player of the Week, after averaging 24.0 points, 4.0 rebounds, 2.5 assists, and 1.0 steals in victories over Hampton and UNC Wilmington. Robinson was named CAA Sixth Man of the Year, after averaging 11.2 points and 3.2 rebounds per game off of the bench.

== Professional career ==
=== BC Šilutė/KK Jahorina (2024) ===
After going undrafted in the 2023 NBA Draft, Robinson signed to play for BC Šilutė of the Lithuanian Basketball League (NKL) on January 22, 2024. Across ten games, he averaged 21.8 points, 5.9 rebounds, and 2.8 assists.

On September 24, 2024, Robinson signed to play for KK Jahorina of the Bosnian League (BiH Liga). Across six games, he averaged 6.3 points and 3.7 rebounds.

=== UCC Demons (2024–2025) ===
In November 2024, Robinson signed to play for the UCC Demons of the Irish Super League. He made his debut on November 29, scoring 29 points in a victory over Killorglin. Robinson was named Irish League Player of the Year after averaging 28.3 points, 5.9 rebounds, and 4.8 assists per game en route to the league championship. On April 13, 2025, Robinson scored 35 points in the league's title game against Killester. The Demons defeated Killester 94–92, and Robinson was named MVP for the Champions Trophy Final.

=== Cheshire Phoenix (2025–2026) ===
On July 25, 2025, Robinson signed to play for the Cheshire Phoenix of the British Super League (SLB) during the 2025–26 season. After going undefeated and averaging 26.2 points, 4.0 rebounds, and 4.0 assists per game in January 2026, Robinson was named the Super League's Player of the Month. Robinson received back-to-back Player of the Month honors after averaging 22 points, 5.8 rebounds, and 4.3 assists per game in February 2026. Across 28 games played and only two in the starting lineup, Robinson averaged a league leading 20.0 points per game with a 60.8% two-point percentage. On May 7, Robinson was selected for the All-League Team of the Year, and on May 12 he was named the SLB's Sixth Player of the Year. On May 15, Robinson was named the league's Most Valuable Player, making him the first player in SLB or BBL history to earn Sixth Player of the Year and Most Valuable Player titles in the same season.

=== Liverpool Basketball (2026-present) ===
On September 30, 2026, Robinson signed to play for Liverpool Basketball of the British Super League (SLB) during the 2026–27 season.

== Career statistics ==
Legend
GP	Games played	GS	Games started	MPG	Minutes per game
FG%	Field goal percentage	3P%	3-point field goal percentage	FT%	Free throw percentage
RPG	Rebounds per game	APG	Assists per game	SPG	Steals per game
BPG	Blocks per game	PPG	Points per game	**Bold**	Career high

=== NCAA Division II ===
Year	Team	GP	GS	MPG	FG%	3P%	FT%	RPG	APG	SPG	BPG	PPG
2018–19	Holy Family	27	**27**	**37.7**	.548	.333	.732	**5.9**	3.0	1.4	0.1	18.7
2019–20	West Liberty	30	6	23.8	**.552**	**.431**	.723	4.3	2.1	1.5	0.0	17.9
2020–21	West Liberty	23	21	26.9	.536	.374	.763	4.0	2.3	1.3	**0.2**	**20.4**
2021–22	West Liberty	32	32	28.3	.510	.333	**.768**	4.6	**3.2**	**2.1**	0.1	20.3

=== NCAA Division I ===
Year	Team	GP	GS	MPG	FG%	3P%	FT%	RPG	APG	SPG	BPG	PPG
2022–23	Charleston	**35**	2	19.2	.466	.338	.725	3.1	1.0	0.8	0.1	10.3
