= Frank Haig =

American academic administrator (1928–2024)

Frank R. Haig S.J.

President of Wheeling Jesuit College
- In office July 15, 1966 – August 21, 1972
- Preceded by: William F. Troy, S.J.
- Succeeded by: Charles Currie Jr., S.J.

President of Le Moyne College
- In office July 1, 1981 – 1987
- Preceded by: William J. O'Halloran, S.J.
- Succeeded by: James C. Finlay, S.J.

Personal details
- Born: September 11, 1928 Philadelphia, Pennsylvania, U.S.
- Died: February 28, 2024 (aged 95) Merion, Pennsylvania, U.S.
- Profession: Jesuit, academic

Frank Rawle Haig, S.J. (September 11, 1928 – February 28, 2024) was an American Jesuit priest, physicist and academic administrator. He served as the third President of Wheeling Jesuit University from 1966 to 1972 and the seventh president of Le Moyne College from 1981 until 1987.

== Biography ==
=== Early life ===
Born in Philadelphia, Pennsylvania, on September 11, 1928, Haig was the younger brother of Alexander Haig, who served as the United States Secretary of State under Ronald Reagan from 1981 until 1982. Haig entered the Jesuit order in Wernersville, Pennsylvania shortly after graduating from Lower Merion Senior High School in Lower Merion Township, Pennsylvania in 1946. Thereafter, he received a B.A. from Woodstock College in 1952, a licentiate in philosophy from Bellarmine College in Plattsburgh, New York in 1953 and a Ph.D. in theoretical physics from the Catholic University of America in 1959. He also earned a second licentiate in sacred theology from Woodstock College in 1961, the year of his ordination.

=== Wheeling College, Johns Hopkins University, and Loyola University Maryland ===
Haig joined the faculty of the physics department at Wheeling College, which is now known as Wheeling University and no longer affiliated with the Jesuits, in 1963 after completing a postdoctoral fellowship at the University of Rochester.

Haig was appointed the third president of Wheeling College in 1966, succeeded the school's second head, Father William F. Troy, S.J. Haig was inaugurated president on July 15, 1966. In his acceptance speech, Haig told the audience, "The world will be what our men and women of insight make it to be...It is a challenge to be asked to help them see all right."

Haig remained president until his resignation on August 21, 1972. He was succeeded by Charles Currie Jr., S.J. While serving as a visiting fellow at Johns Hopkins University, Haig became in 1972 an astrophysics professor with the department of physics, engineering and computer science at Loyola University Maryland (also in Baltimore, Maryland), where he served as chair during the 1980–1981 academic year.

=== Le Moyne College ===
Haig was appointed the president of Le Moyne College in Syracuse, New York, in 1981, succeeding Father William J. O'Halloran, S.J.

Haig became acting president of Le Moyne College on January 1, 1981. He was formally inaugurated as the college's seventh president on Friday, January 22, 1982.

Haig remained president of Le Moyne until 1987 and was succeeded by interim president James C. Finlay, S.J.

=== Later life ===
Haig returned to Loyola in 1987 and was named professor emeritus of physics in 2005. He received the Lifetime Achievement Award from the Washington Academy of Sciences at its annual meeting in Washington, D.C., on May 19, 2016. He served on the Scientific and Educational Council of the Maryland Academy of Science and as treasurer of the Washington Academy of Sciences. He presented papers and lectures both in the United States and abroad and lived at the Manresa Hall Jesuit Community on the campus of St. Joseph's University in Philadelphia until his death.

Haig died in Merion, Pennsylvania, on February 28, 2024, at the age of 95.
