= William Troy =

William Troy may refer to:

- William Troy (Medal of Honor) (1848–1907), US Navy Medal of Honor recipient
- William F. Troy (1920–1967), American Jesuit, president of Wheeling Jesuit University
- William Troy (abolitionist) (1827–1905), Baptist minister, writer, abolitionist
- William Troy (educator) (1903–1961), American writer and teacher

== See also ==
- William Troy Herriage, baseball player
