= Redneck Brawl =

American pay-per-view boxing website

- Also known as: RedneckBrawl.tv
- Country of origin: United states
- Original language: English

Production
- Production locations: United States (Mainly Tennessee, Georgia and West Virginia)
- Running time: 4 hours

Original release
- Release: 2022 – present

Redneck Brawl is an American pay-per-view website that specializes in airing professional boxing in mainland United States. Many of the fights have been taken place at the Charleston Coliseum in Charleston, West Virginia. Every fight has around 25-40 rounds usually between redneck men from the southeastern part of the United States of America. There are around 8 replays of each match. With the next match being in the future Each contestant has the chance to win 500 Dollars If they win. People like Frankie Lapenne and Lil Smokey are known boxers in redneck brawl.

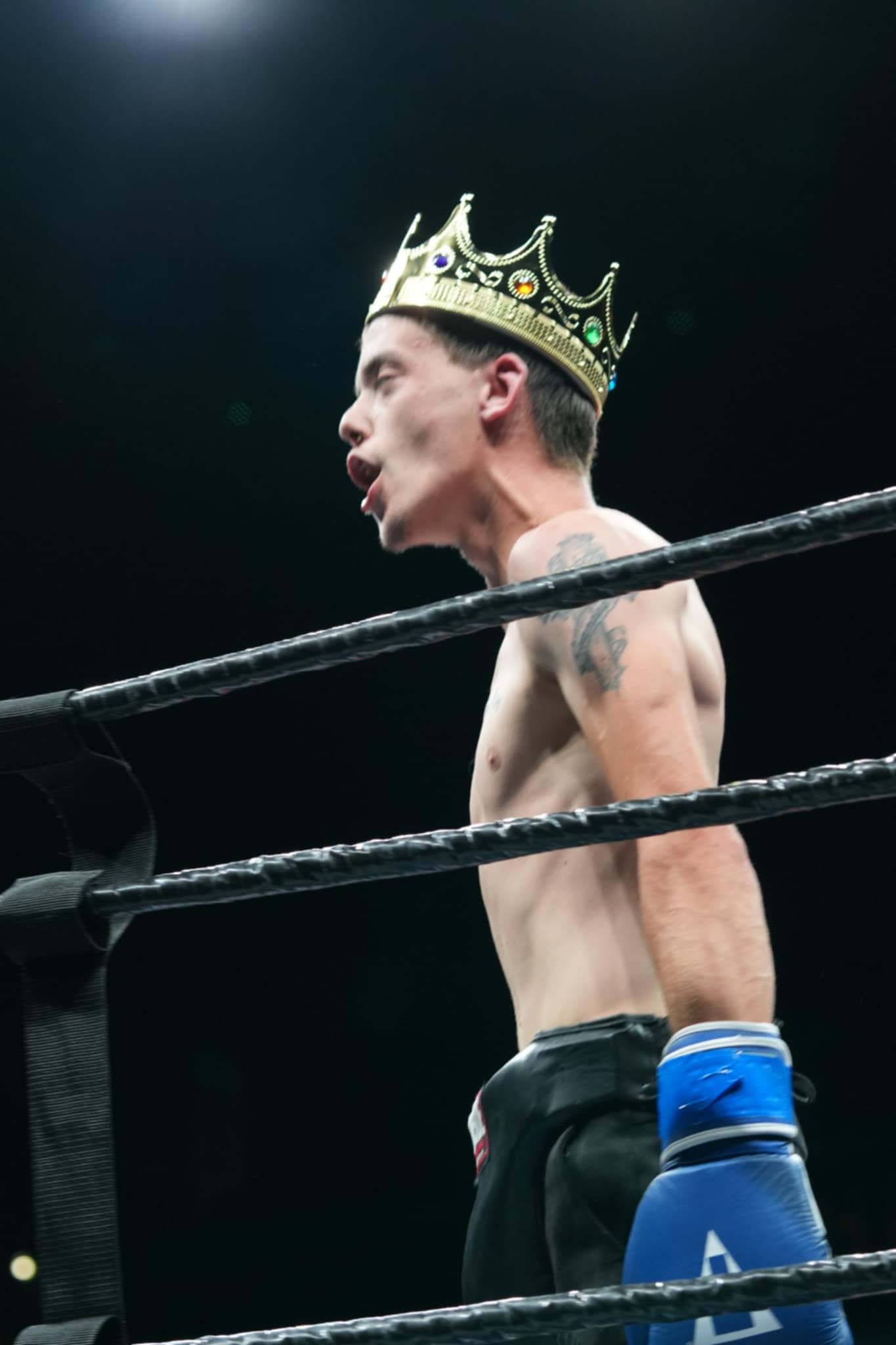
Lil Smokey Winning after Redneck 6 brawl

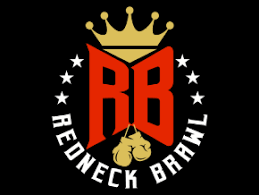
Redneck Brawl logo

== Redneck Brawl 3 ==
Aired on August 19, 2023, at the Charleston Coliseum in Charleston, West Virginia. The event features at least 37 fights.

== Redneck Brawl 8 ==
Aired on December 14, 2024, at the Heritage Bank Center in Cincinnati, Ohio, home to the Cincinnati Cyclones. 25 matches were held between 50 contestants.

== Redneck Brawl 11 ==
Aired on December 13, 2025, at the Charleston Coliseum in Charleston, West Virginia. 36 Matches were held between 72 contestants.

== Redneck Brawl 12 ==
Aired on February 7th, 2026. At the Huntington Center in Toledo, Ohio. 27 Matches were held between 54 contestants. Usually coming from Michigan or Ohio. The commentator for this match was "Catfish Cooley!"

== Redneck Brawl 14 ==
This boxing event took place in Johnson City, Tennessee at the Freedom Hall City Center on August 15th, 2026 at 8PM Est. This event has also been billed in as the "Hillbilly Slugfest"

Notable winners from RB14 include: Frankie Lapenne and Jåy Mðñêy. With frankie winning by decision.

Frankie Lapenne
