= McDonough Center =

McDonough Center may refer to:

- McDonough Gymnasium, at Georgetown University
- McDonough Center for Leadership & Business, at Marietta College
- Alma Grace McDonough Health and Recreation Center, at Wheeling Jesuit University
