= Zac Bruney =

American football coach (born c. 1983)

Current position
- Title: Head coach
- Team: Wheeling
- Conference: MEC
- Record: 32–37

Biographical details
- Born: c. 1983 (age 42–43); Martins Ferry, Ohio, U.S.
- Education: University of Mount Union (2005); University of Toledo (2009)

Playing career
- 2001–2004: Mount Union
- 2005: Ohio Valley Greyhounds
- Positions: Quarterback, wide receiver

Coaching career (HC unless noted)
- 2005: Mount Union (QB)
- 2006: Mount Union (DB)
- 2007–2008: Toledo (GA)
- 2009–2012: Mount Union (OC/WR)
- 2013–2014: Ohio Dominican (QB)
- 2015–2016: Ohio Dominican (AHC/OC/QB)
- 2017–present: Wheeling

Head coaching record
- Overall: 32–37

Accomplishments and honors

Awards
- AFCA All-American (2004)

Zac Bruney (born c. 1983) is an American college football coach. He is the head football coach for Wheeling University, a position he has held since 2017. He also coached for Mount Union, Toledo, and Ohio Dominican. He played college football for Mount Union as a quarterback and professionally for the Ohio Valley Greyhounds of United Indoor Football (UIF) as a wide receiver.

== Head coaching record ==
Year	Team	Overall	Conference	Standing	Bowl/playoffs
Wheeling Cardinals (Mountain East Conference) (2019–present)
2019	Wheeling	1–10	1–9	T–9th	
2020–21	Wheeling	2–2	2–2	T–3rd (North)	
2021	Wheeling	5–6	5–5	T–6th	
2022	Wheeling	7–4	6–4	T–4th	
2023	Wheeling	5–5	4–5	T–7th	
2024	Wheeling	6–5	5–4	T–5th	
2025	Wheeling	6–5	5–3	T–3rd	
2026	Wheeling	0–0	0–0		
Wheeling:		32–37	28–32		
Total:		32–37			
