= George Novacky =

- Education: University of Pittsburgh
- Scientific career
- Fields: Computer Science, Mathematics
- Workplaces: University of Pittsburgh
- Doctoral advisor: Chong-Yun Chao

George A. Novacky was an Assistant Department Chair and Senior Lecturer in Computer Science, and an Assistant Dean of CAS for Undergraduate Studies at the University of Pittsburgh.

== Education and career ==
Novacky first received a mathematics degree from Wheeling Jesuit College in 1968. In 1971, he received his MA in mathematics followed by a PhD in mathematics in 1981. Both his MA and PhD were from University of Pittsburgh. Novacky's dissertation was Chromaticity of Extremal Graphs.

He was an Associate Professor of Mathematics at the Community College of Allegheny County from 1977 to 1985.

He has been a faculty member of the University of Pittsburgh's Department of Computer Science since 1985. In 1993, Novacky received The Chancellor's Distinguished Teaching Award.

== Publications ==
- Computers and Networks: A Laboratory Approach to Computer Literacy, published by McGraw Hill
- Computer Applications & the Internet, co-author with Y. Khalifa. Published by Pearson, 2003
- PDA Programming in C, co-author with Yasir Khalifa. Published by Kendall Hunt, 2006
