= Cardinal Connection =

Student newspaper of Wheeling Jesuit University

The Cardinal Connection
- Type: Biweekly student newspaper
- Format: Broadsheet
- School: Wheeling Jesuit University
- Editor: Lucy DeFruscio
- Founded: 1955; 70 years ago
- Headquarters: 316 Washington Ave. Wheeling, West Virginia 26003
- Country: United States
- Circulation: 400
- Website: www.wju.edu/cardinal/archive.asp

The Cardinal Connection is the official student newspaper of Wheeling Jesuit University. It is published biweekly; over the course of the academic calendar this works out to six times per semester.

== History ==
Student journalism at then-Wheeling College began on November 22, 1955 with the first publication of The Spokesman. The paper ceased publication in 1980, and began again as Nova in 1982. The newspaper continued under this name until 1989, when the name switched back to The Spokesman. In 1997, the paper adopted the name Cardinal Connection.

The Cardinal Connection began publishing six times per semester during the 2009-2010 school year, and in 2010-2011, adopted a 12 page, four section format. The paper is managed by an administrative moderator, an editor-in-chief, and section editors.

== Sections ==
During the 2010-2011 school year, the Cardinal Connection published four sections. A fifth was added for the 2011-2012 school year.

=== News ===
The News section consists of the front page and three other pages of campus and city news. Frequent topics include food service, student government, and Campus Activities Board programming.

=== Arts & Living ===
Arts & Living is dedicated to popular trends, student creative work, and reviews of music, films, and literature. The section also includes a spotlight on one Academic Resource Center tutor in every issue.

==== Ask a Student ====
Ask a Student is a feature in every issue in which one student from each class answers a question - usually pertaining to campus life - and is photographed.

=== Mission & Identity ===
Beginning in the 2011-2012 school year, the Cardinal Connection includes a section related to the university's Jesuit identity. Topics for the section include campus ministry and service work on campus and in the community.

=== Sports ===
The sports section covers Wheeling Jesuit University's athletic programs. A "Senior Spotlight" is included in every issue and profiles one of WJU's senior athletes. In addition, the sports section covers the careers of alumni who participated in sports while at WJU.

=== Opinion ===
The opinion section features student analysis of university affairs and current events. Additionally, the opinion section usually includes a cartoon.

==== Point/Counterpoint ====
Point/Counterpoint is included in every issue of the paper. In it, two students present opposing arguments to the same question, which can range from university issues to popular culture.

== Membership ==
The Cardinal Connection is open to all WJU students regardless of major. Students who contribute to at least one issue during a semester are listed as staff members in their byline; those who are submitting a guest column or writing for a class are considered guest contributors. The editor-in-chief and section editors are chosen through an application process.
