= Susan McGalla =

American businesswoman

Susan P. McGalla
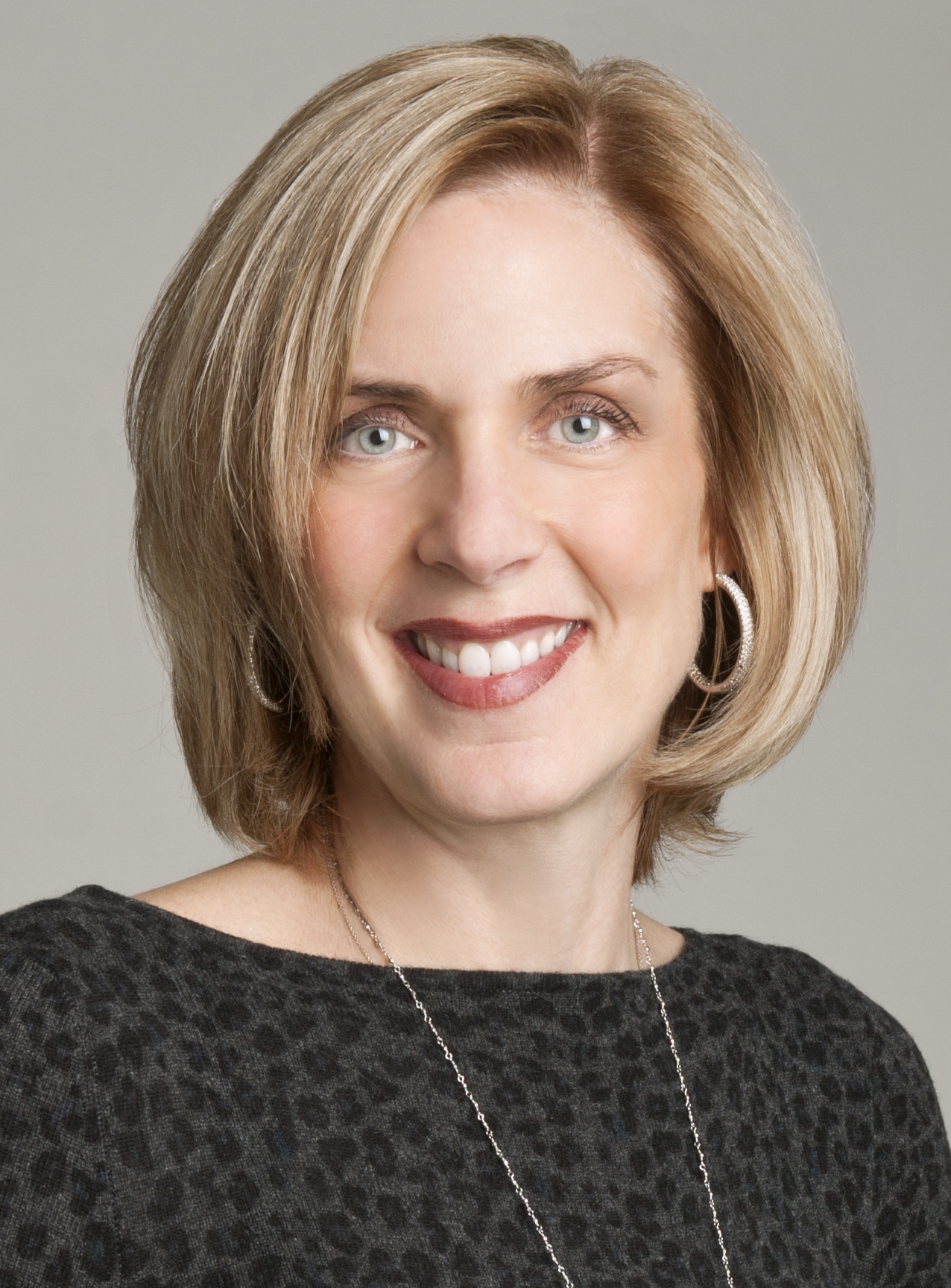
- Born: May 31, 1964 (age 62); East Liverpool, Ohio
- Education: Mount Union College
- Occupation: Businesswoman
- Known for: Vice President of Business Strategy and Creative Development, Pittsburgh Steelers

Susan McGalla is an American businesswoman and executive consultant from Pittsburgh, Pennsylvania. She is best known as the former president of American Eagle Outfitters Inc. and former chief executive officer of Wet Seal Inc. McGalla sits on the boards of HFF Inc., a publicly traded company that provides commercial real estate services, and the Magee-Womens Hospital Research Institute and Foundation. She is a former trustee of the University of Pittsburgh and director of the Allegheny Conference on Community Development.

== Career ==
Susan McGalla began her career at Joseph Horne Company, where she worked in various marketing and managerial positions from 1986 until 1994. She joined American Eagle Outfitters later that year. McGalla started her career at American Eagle as a divisional merchandise buyer for women's clothing and worked at the company in various managerial roles until she became the company's president and chief merchandising officer (CMO). She had worked as president and CMO for the company's flagship American Eagle brand prior to her becoming president and CMO of the entire company. As company president of American Eagle, McGalla oversaw the launch of the company's aerie and 77kids brands.

McGalla left American Eagle Inc. in January 2009 and became a private consultant for the retail and financial investment industries. She was appointed to the Board of Directors of HFF Inc. in October 2009. McGalla succeeded Ed Thomas as chief executive officer of Wet Seal Inc. in January 2011. In the beginning of her tenure as CEO of Wet Seal, Inc, McGalla was pregnant and worked both remotely before starting full-time in August 2011. She was terminated "effective immediately" by the board in July 2012 after the company reported 11 months of declining sales. Following her departure from Wet Seal Inc., McGalla founded P3 Executive Consulting. She is Vice President of Business Strategy and Creative Development for the Pittsburgh Steelers.

== Personal life ==
McGalla was born and raised with her two brothers in East Liverpool, Ohio. Her father was a local football coach. She received a bachelor's degree in business and marketing from Mount Union College, where she serves on the college's Board of Advisors. She is married to Stephen McGalla, a wealth manager.
