= Wheeling Cardinals =

- University: Wheeling University
- Nickname: Cardinals
- NCAA: Division II
- Conference: MEC (primary)
- Athletic director: Carrie Hanna
- Location: Wheeling, West Virginia
- Varsity teams: 19
- Football stadium: Bishop Schmitt Field
- Basketball arena: McDonough Center
- Baseball stadium: J.B. Chambers Baseball/Softball Complex
- Soccer stadium: Bishop Schmitt Field
- Colors: Red and White
- Mascot: Iggy the Cardinal
- Website: wucardinals.com
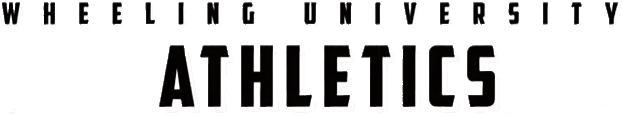

Team NCAA championships
- 1

The Wheeling Cardinals are the athletic teams that represent Wheeling University, located in Wheeling, West Virginia, in intercollegiate sports as a member of the Division II level of the National Collegiate Athletic Association (NCAA), primarily competing in the Mountain East Conference (MEC) as a founding member since the 2013–14 academic year. The Cardinals previously competed in the defunct West Virginia Intercollegiate Athletic Conference (WVIAC) from 1957–58 to 2012–13.

== History ==
Wheeling University competes in NCAA Division II as part of the MEC. It had been a member of the WVIAC from 1957 to 2013. In June 2012, the nine football-playing schools in the WVIAC announced their intention to break away and form a new conference, which then became the MEC. Although the university was initially left out of the split, it would soon receive an invitation to become a charter member of the new conference.

The university amassed 47 WVIAC titles during its tenure in that conference, and also boasts 40 Academic All-Americans.

== Varsity teams ==
Wheeling competes in 22 intercollegiate varsity sports, with one other sport to be added in 2026–27.

Men's sports	Women's sports
Baseball	Acrobatics & tumbling
Basketball	Basketball
Cross country	Cross country
Football	Golf
Golf	Lacrosse
Lacrosse	Rugby
Rugby	Swimming
Soccer	Soccer
Swimming	Softball
Track and field	Track and field
Wrestling	Volleyball
	Wrestling (2026–27)

== Individual sports ==
=== Rugby ===
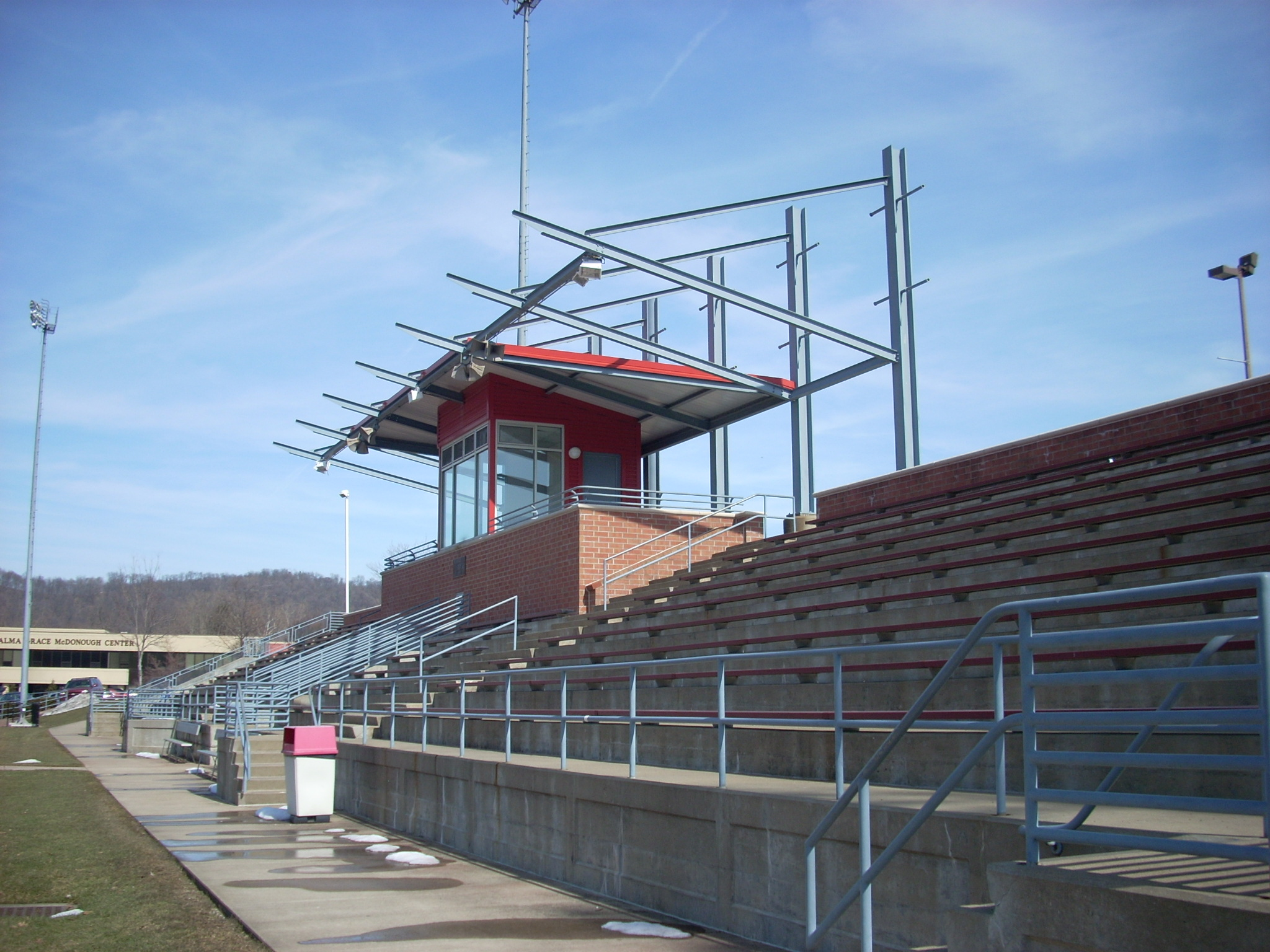
The Van Horne Grandstands, part of WU's outdoor athletic complex.

Rugby, formerly offered as a club sport from 1967 to 1994, was restarted after an 18-year hiatus in December 2011. The university restarted its rugby program in part because the increasing popularity of rugby in Jesuit high schools meant that offering college rugby would be one way to attract more students. The rugby team is a full varsity men's sport and provides scholarships for athletes. The university hired Eric Jerpe as the head coach of the program. Jerpe previously held various leadership positions, including with the Pittsburgh Harlequins, as manager of the US U-17 national team, and as a member of the USA Rugby board of directors.

Wheeling played its first rugby sevens tournament in September 2012, where Wheeling finished fourth in the MAC Sevens despite fielding a team composed entirely of freshmen. Wheeling notched its first win in fifteens on September 8, 2012, when Wheeling defeated the West Virginia Mountaineers 10–6 at home in front of a large crowd at James LaRosa Stadium.

The program elevated to the Division 1-A Rugby and joined Rugby East starting in the 2014 season. Governed by USA Rugby, DI-A is the highest level of men's college rugby in the United States and is administered by USA Rugby. Wheeling reached a program-high ranking during the 2015 season when the Cardinals finished 18th in the nation. The team did not play a D-IA schedule during the 2019–20 season, instead the Cardinals played an independent schedule.

=== Volleyball ===
The lady Cardinals captured the school's very first NCAA Division II National Championship on Dec. 12, 2015. The team's record for the 2015 season was 39–4.

=== Swimming and Diving ===
In 2019, Wheeling University reinstated its men's and women's swimming and diving programs, along with lacrosse, men's golf, and competitive cheer. The university dropped the program in 2017.

Cardinals swimming program won three-straight WVIAC titles in men's competition from 2000 to 2002 and won the WVIAC women's swimming championship. In 1998, Zoran Lazarovski won the university's only NCAA championship in the 200-yard butterfly individual event, finishing the race in 1:48.26, at the 1998 NCAA Division II Swimming and Diving Championships. As teams, the women's team finished 16th in 1998 while the men's reached a program-high 14th in the 2000 event.

=== Football ===
In 2017 the athletic department announced that the university would be adding football with an exhibition schedule in 2018. Zac Bruney the offensive coordinator at Ohio Dominican University was named the program's first head coach on July 7, 2017. Team began play during the 2019 season and recorded their first win on November 16, 2019, with a 27–20 victory at Concord University. The Cardinals finished the inaugural season with a 1–10 overall record.

=== Wrestling ===
In January 2013, athletic director Danny Sancomb announced that Wheeling would be adding wrestling at the school's 20th intercollegiate sport. Wheeling native and Cornell graduate, Sean Doyle was hired to build the program to compete in the fall of 2013. All-American wrestler JD Ramsey was hired as a Graduate Assistant, while Matt Littleton and BJ Hedger were hired to serve as volunteer assistants in the first year. The first recruiting class of 29, includes wrestlers from 7 different states and the team will compete as an NCAA Division II program immediately. The university has designed a new wrestling facility, which was ready for use in the fall of 2013. The program was positioned to become competitive in a short period of time. The program's success was short-lived when the program was not sponsored for the 2019–20 season after a mass exodus of the roster that coincided with significant cuts to other departments at the university due to on-going financial issues and restructuring from the Jesuits.

In May 2020, August Wesley was named as the third head coach in the history of the program and began to rebuild the program to fully compete in the 2020–21 season.

== National championships ==
=== Team ===
Sport	Association	Division	Year	Opponent/Runner-up	Score
Women's volleyball (1)	NCAA	Division II	2015	Palm Beach Atlantic	2–0
