= Ginny Favede =

University president

Ginny R. Favede

13th President of Wheeling University
- In office October 7, 2019 – 20 February 2024
- Preceded by: Michael P. Mihalyo, Jr.
- Succeeded by: Dianna Vargo

Personal details
- Education: The Ohio State University
- Profession: College administrator, Educator

Ginny R. Favede is an American academic administrator who was the 13th president of Wheeling University, in Wheeling, West Virginia, serving from October 2019 to February 2024.

== Personal life ==
Originally from the Dayton, Ohio area, Favede is the youngest of ten siblings. She is married to Lee Favede, an optometrist who practices in Bridgeport after the two met while in university. They have two children, Frank and Cecelia.

== Early career ==
Favede received her B.A. in Political Science from Ohio State University and a Master of Business Administration from Wheeling University.

Favede served as a member of the St. Clairsville City Council and as a County Commissioner of Belmont County, Ohio. She ran for 95th District Ohio House of Representatives in 2016.

== Career at Wheeling University ==
Immediately prior to her presidency, Favede was appointed Chair of the Board of Trustees of Wheeling University. After her appointment as president in October 2019, she oversaw the transition of Wheeling University from its former name of Wheeling Jesuit University and introduced a number of directives aimed at stabilizing the tenuous financial position of the institution. She was suspended by the university in February 2024; the reason has not been stated publicly.
