= George Lundy =

George Francis Lundy, S.J., (January 26, 1947 – December 20, 2011) was an American Jesuit academic and university administrator. He served as president of Wheeling Jesuit University in West Virginia from 2000 to 2003. Much of Lundy's work in activism and academia centered on issues concerning social justice.

== Biography ==
Lundy was originally from Chicago, Illinois. He first joined the Society of Jesus, also known as the Jesuits, when at the age of 19. He received his bachelor's degree in sociology from Loyola University New Orleans and his master's degree from the Jesuit School of Theology. He also obtained a doctorate from the University of Chicago.

Lundy joined the faculty of Loyola University New Orleans. He served as the director of the university's Institute for Human Understanding, which is now called the Twomey Center for Peace Through Justice, during the early 1980s. The center studies and works with social issues, notably justice, racism, workers' rights, and poverty. Lundy also joined Loyola's faculty, teaching courses in labor studies through the institute. Additionally, Lundy established his own school through Loyola, which taught labor leaders how to effectively organize and maintain a labor union. As part of the school, Lundy created and implemented a labor plan for a company, based in Germany, written in both German and English.

During his tenure at Loyola, Lundy co-created a religious coalition in opposition to the death penalty with Sister Helen Prejean and Rev. Joe Morris Doss, the then Episcopal pastor of the Grace Episcopal Church in New Orleans and future Bishop of the Episcopal Diocese of New Jersey.

In 1986, Loyola New Orleans President James C. Carter, S.J. appointed Lundy as the university's provost and vice president for academic affairs. Lundy had been serving as the director of the Institute for Human Relations at the time of his appointment. He worked as provost from 1986 to 1992.

Lundy became the Vice President of University of Detroit Mercy, a Jesuit institution in Michigan, in 2000. Lundy was appointed the President of Wheeling Jesuit University in 2000, where he served for three years.

Following his departure from Wheeling Jesuit, Lundy was sent to Southern University in Baton Rouge, Louisiana, where he served as the pastor for the university's Catholic Student Center. In 2011, Lundy returned to Loyola New Orleans, where he directed a Twomey Center for Peace Through Justice campaign to end the death penalty by gaining the support of medical professionals.

Father George Lundy died of complications of a stroke at Tulane Medical Center in New Orleans on December 20, 2011, at the age of 64. He was survived by his mother, Mary Lundy, and three sisters - Noreen Osterlein, Barbara Lundy, and Mary Semela. He was buried at St. Charles College in Grand Coteau, Louisiana.
