= Dianna Vargo =

14th President of Wheeling University
- Incumbent
- Assumed office September 6, 2024
- Preceded by: Ginny Favede

Personal details
- Education: Ohio University; Wheeling Jesuit College; West Virginia University

Dianna Vargo is an American academic administrator serving as the fourteenth president of Wheeling University since 2024. She previously worked for Ohio County, West Virginia schools for 32 years including as its superintendent and principal of Wheeling Park High School.

== Life ==
Vargo earned a Bachelor of Arts in mathematics from Ohio University in 1981, a Master of Arts in Science/Mathematics Education from Wheeling Jesuit College in 1987, a Master of Arts in Education Administration from West Virginia University (WVU) in 1993, and a Doctorate in Educational Leadership from WVU in 2009.

Vargo began her career in 1983 as a math teacher at Wheeling Park High School, where she also coached cross-country and track. She later served as an assistant principal and, in 2001, was appointed principal. In 2005, she became the Assistant Superintendent of Ohio County Schools, and in 2009, she was appointed Deputy Superintendent. Vargo has been active in various community organizations. Vargo joined the Ohio Valley Athletic Conference (OVAC) Executive Board in 2001 and became its president in 2007. She served on the boards of Easter Seals, the Wheeling Hall of Fame Committee, and the Wheeling YMCA. Additionally, she is a member of the Civitan of Wheeling and the Wheeling Rotary Club. In June 2016, Vargo has retired as superintendent of Ohio County, West Virginia Schools after 32 years of service, following controversy over the board's decision not to renew her contract in a 3 to 2 vote. At her final meeting, many praised her contributions.

Vargo joined Wheeling University as the director of education programs. On February 20, 2024, Vargo replaced Ginny Favede as its interim chief operating officer. In September 2024, she was named its fourteenth president.
