= John M. Maris =

American pediatric oncologist

- Spouse: Yael Mossé

Academic background
- Education: BS, Biology, 1983, Wheeling University; MD, 1989, Perelman School of Medicine at the University of Pennsylvania

Academic work
- Institutions: Children's Hospital of Philadelphia; Perelman School of Medicine at the University of Pennsylvania; Stand Up to Cancer
- Main interests: neuroblastoma

John Matthew Maris is an American pediatric oncologist. He is the Giulio D’Angio Endowed Professor of Pediatrics at the Children's Hospital of Philadelphia (CHOP) and Full Professor at the Perelman School of Medicine at the University of Pennsylvania.

== Early life and education ==
Maris completed his Bachelor of Science degree from Wheeling Jesuit University in 1983 and his medical degree from the Perelman School of Medicine at the University of Pennsylvania in 1989.

== Career ==
Upon completing his formal education, Maris was appointed an assistant professor of Pediatrics at the Perelman School of Medicine at the University of Pennsylvania in 1996. While working in this role, Maris and his research team focused on childhood cancer neuroblastoma and the understanding of molecular pathogenesis towards improved survival rates. They used integrative strategy, combining genomic and functional strategies to prioritize molecular targets in order to achieve a comprehensive approach to neuroblastoma. He was eventually promoted to the rank of associate professor and elected to the Society for Pediatric Research. Following this, he was also elected to the American Society for Clinical Investigation in 2007.

In 2008, Maris led the team that identified common DNA variations on chromosome 6, the first time researchers found its genetic origin. He also collaborated with physician-scientist Yael Moss to test the drug crizotinib as a possible treatment for neuroblastoma. By 2010, Maris was named chief of Oncology at the Children's Hospital of Philadelphia and director of the Hospital’s Center for Childhood Cancer Research. In 2013, Maris and physician Crystal Mackall were named co-chairs of the Stand Up to Cancer-St. Baldrick’s Foundation Immunogenomics Dream Team. The research group would use genomics to identify targets for CAR T-cell therapy. In January 2013, Maris co-authored Combination Therapy Targeting the Chk1 and Wee1 Kinases Shows Therapeutic Efficacy in Neuroblastoma which was a combination study of investigational agents slowed the growth of neuroblastomas in mice. Later that year, he tested the investigational medicine LEE011 on slowing the growth of neuroblastomas in mice. The Dream Team later identified several highly specific targets in high-risk neuroblastoma and engineered a cellular therapy directed at these targets with potent killing against tumor cells.

During the COVID-19 pandemic, Maris's Dream Team were recognized with the 2021 American Association for Cancer Research Team Science Award.
