= Angela Neal-Barnett =

American child psychologist

- Education: University of Mount Union & DePaul University
- Occupations: Psychologist & Tenured Professor
- Years active: 1988-Present

Angela M. Neal-Barnett is an American professor and child psychologist working at Kent State University in Kent, Ohio, US. Neal-Barnett's research and work focuses on supporting Black women and girls with anxiety.

== Biography ==
Neal-Barnett graduated from the University of Mount Union with a BA in psychology. She received an MA and a PhD from DePaul University, earning her PhD in 1988.

Neal-Barnett is a tenured professor at Kent State University in the Department of Psychological Sciences. She was the first African American woman in this department to be tenured. In 2020 she was the recipient of the Anxiety and Depression Association of America's Jerilyn Ross Clinician Advocate Award.

== Academic work ==
Neal-Barnett authored Soothe Your Nerves: The Black Woman's Guide to Understanding and Overcoming, Anxiety, Panic and Fear which deals with anxiety, panic, and fear as they are experienced by Black women. She provides some possible coping methods to each as potential guidance for Black women.

As of June 2021, Neal-Barnett works in Kent State University's psychology department, where she frequently teaches classes for both graduate- and undergraduate-level students. She teaches classes such as child psychopathology.

== Research ==
Neal-Barnett is the acting director of Kent State University's Program for Research on Anxiety Disorders among African Americans Department of Psychology (PRADAA), where she conducts research alongside students on topics regarding trichotillomania, anxiety, racial identity, acting white, and the physical and emotional health of African American girls. She has been published in the Journal of Anxiety Disorders, Journal of Affective Disorders, and Journal of the National Medical Association among others.

Many of Neal-Barnett's most cited works explore the accusation common among Black Americans that someone is "acting white" and her research links this to social anxiety.

Other publications, such as In the company of my sisters: Sister Circles as an anxiety intervention for African American women, present possible ways for African American female professionals to cope with and seek support for their anxiety, such as confidential focus groups and "indigenous form(s) of healing". Neal-Barnett took this research a step further and has led Sister Circle workshops for leaders of organizations to learn about how they might develop Sister Circle programs within their organizations.

In 2017, Neal-Barnett was featured on the NPR radio show On Point, in an episode called "Teen Anxiety On The Rise". In this episode she spoke about how anxiety has facets that are psychological, biological, and social, making it very complex, but still treatable. Neal-Barnett was also featured in a 2020 Forbes article, where she discussed how racism in America is linked to trauma and stress for Black people.

== Selected publications ==
- Stadulis, R.E., Neal-Barnett, A.M., MacCracken, M.J., & Fender-Scarr, L. (2014). Social physique anxiety in early Black adolescent girls. Comprehensive Psychology, 3, 12.
- Murray, M.S., Neal-Barnett, A.M., *Demmings, J., & Stadulis, R.E. (2012). The acting white accusation, racial identity and anxiety in African American adolescents. Journal of Anxiety Disorders, 526–532. doi: 10.1016/j.janxdis.2012.02.006
- Neal-Barnett, A.M., Payne, M.R., Murray, M., Stadulis, R., Thomas, A., & Salley, B. (2011). Sister circles as a culturally relevant intervention for anxious African American Women. Clinical Psychology: Science and Practice, 18, 266–273. doi: 10.1111/j.14
- Neal-Barnett, A.M., Stadulis, Payne, M.R., Crosby, L., Mitchell. M., Costa, C.W., Williams, L. (2011). In the company of my sisters: Sister Circles as an anxiety intervention for African American women. Journal of Affective Disorders.
- Neal-Barnett, A.M., Stadulis, R., *Singer, N, *Murray, M., & *Demming, J. (2010). Assessing the effects of experiencing the acting white accusation, The Urban Review, 42 (2), 102–122. DOI 10.1007/s11256-009-0130-5.
- Neal-Barnett, A. M., Flessner, C.; Woods, D.; Franklin, M.; Keuthen, N., & Stein, D. (2010 ). Ethnic Differences in Trichotillomania: Phenomenology, Interference, Impairment, and Treatment Efficacy. Journal of Anxiety Disorders 24 (6), 553–558. DOI 10.101
- Neal-Barnett, Statom, D. & Stadulis, R. (2010) Trichotillomania symptoms in African Americans: Are they related to anxiety and culture? CNS Neuroscience & Therapeutics, no. doi: 10.1111/j. 1755–5949.2010.00138.x
- Neal-Barnett, A.M., Crosby, L.C., and Salley, B.B. (2010). Anxiety. In R. Hampton, R. Crowell, & T. Gullota (Eds.) Handbook of African American Health Psychology New York: Guilford.
- Neal-Barnett, A. M. & Stadulis, R. (2006). Affective states and racial identity among African American women with trichotillomania. Journal of the National Medical Association, 98, 753–757.
