= Wheeling Cardinals football =

College football team

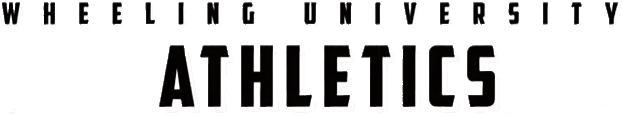
- First season: 2019; 7 years ago
- Athletic director: Carrie Hanna
- Head coach: Zac Bruney; 8th season, 32–35 (.478)
- Location: Wheeling, West Virginia
- Stadium: Bishop Schmitt Field (capacity: 3,000)
- NCAA division: Division II
- Conference: MEC
- Colors: Cardinal and black
- All-time record: 32–35 (.478)
- Rivalries: West Liberty
- Mascot: Cardinal
- Website: wucardinals.com/football

The Wheeling Cardinals football team represents Wheeling University in college football at the NCAA Division II level. The Cardinals are members of the Mountain East Conference (MEC), fielding its team in the MEC since 2019. The Cardinals play their home games at Bishop Schmitt Field in Wheeling, West Virginia.

Their head coach is Zac Bruney, who took over the position for the team's inaugural 2019 season.

== Conference affiliations ==
- Mountain East Conference (2019–present)

== List of head coaches ==
=== Key ===
Key to symbols in coaches list
| General | | Overall | | Conference | | Postseason (Note: Although the first Rose Bowl Game was played in 1902, it has been continuously played since the 1916 game, and is recognized as the oldest bowl game by the NCAA. "—" indicates any season prior to 1916 when postseason games were not played.) | |
|---|---|---|---|---|---|---|---|
| No. | Order of coaches (Note: A running total of the number of head coaches, with coaches who served separate tenures being counted only once. Interim head coaches are represented with "Int" and are not counted in the running total. "—" indicates the team played but either without a coach or no coach is on record. "X" indicates an interim year without play.) | GC | Games coached | CW | Conference wins | PW | Postseason wins |
| DC | Division championships | OW | Overall wins | CL | Conference losses | PL | Postseason losses |
| CC | Conference championships | OL | Overall losses | CT | Conference ties | PT | Postseason ties |
| NC | National championships | OT | Overall ties (Note: Overtime rules in college football were introduced in 1996, making ties impossible in the period since.) | C% | Conference winning percentage | | |
| † | Elected to the College Football Hall of Fame | O% | Overall winning percentage (Note: When computing the win–loss percentage, a tie counts as half a win and half a loss.) | | | | |

=== Coaches ===
List of head football coaches showing season(s) coached, overall records, conference records, postseason records, championships and selected awards
| No. | Name | Season(s) | GC | OW | OL | O% | CW | CL | C% | PW | PL | PT | DC | CC | NC | Awards |
|---|---|---|---|---|---|---|---|---|---|---|---|---|---|---|---|---|
| 1 | Zac Bruney | 2019–present | 58 | 26 | 32 | 0.448 | 23 | 29 | 0.442 | 0 | 0 | 0 | 0 | 0 | 0 | 0 |

== Year-by-year results ==
| National champions | Conference champions | Bowl game berth | Playoff berth |

| Season | Year | Head coach | Association | Division | Conference | Record | | | | | Postseason | Final ranking |
| Season | Year | Head coach | Association | Division | Conference | Overall | | Conference | | | Postseason | Final ranking |
| Season | Year | Head coach | Association | Division | Conference | Win | Loss | Finish | Win | Loss | Postseason | Final ranking |
Wheeling Cardinals
| 2018 | 2018 | Zac Bruney | Club | | | 5 | 0 | | | | | |
| 2019 | 2019 | Zac Bruney | NCAA | Division II | MEC | 1 | 10 | T–9th | 1 | 9 | — | — |
| 2020–21 | 2019 | Zac Bruney | NCAA | Division II | MEC | 2 | 2 | T–3rd (North) | 2 | 2 | — | — |
| 2021 | 2021 | Zac Bruney | NCAA | Division II | MEC | 5 | 6 | T–6th | 5 | 5 | — | — |
| 2022 | 2022 | Zac Bruney | NCAA | Division II | MEC | 7 | 4 | T–4th | 6 | 4 | — | — |
| 2023 | 2023 | Zac Bruney | NCAA | Division II | MEC | 5 | 5 | T–7th | 4 | 5 | — | — |
| 2024 | 2024 | Zac Bruney | NCAA | Division II | MEC | 6 | 5 | T–5th | 5 | 4 | — | — |
