= William F. Troy =

The Reverend William F. Troy SJ

2nd President of Wheeling Jesuit University
- In office 31 July 1959 – July 1966

Personal details
- Born: 8 April 1920 Reading, Pennsylvania, United States
- Died: 14 November 1967 (age 47) Cape May, New Jersey, United States
- Education: Georgetown University (B.A.); Woodstock College (M.Ed.)

William Francis Troy, SJ (8 April 1920 – 14 November 1967) was an American Jesuit, academic, and college administrator. He served as President of Wheeling College (now Wheeling Jesuit University) from 1959 to 1966.

== Biography ==
=== Early life and education ===
William Francis Troy was born on 8 April 1920 in Reading, Pennsylvania, United States. He entered the Society of Jesus on 14 August 1937 at the age of 17. After novitiate, he received a Bachelor of Arts from Georgetown University, and later a Master of Education from Woodstock College. He was ordained a priest on 18 June 1950 in Woodstock, Maryland. His first assignment was as headmaster of Gonzaga College High School in Washington, D.C., where he served from 1950 to 1955.

=== President of Wheeling College ===
In 1955, Troy began his work at the newly established Wheeling College (now Wheeling Jesuit University). He served for four years as the college's first dean. Then, on 31 July 1959, he became the college's second president. Troy, with his down-to-earth and informal style, quickly established a rapport with the students, and joining in on sing-alongs and games of charades. He got around campus in an old, rusty maintenance truck, and encouraged students to come by his office to speak with him freely.

In addition to developing a sense of community, Troy oversaw several major building projects during his presidency. He oversaw the construction of two dormitories, McHugh and Sara Tracy, and later, three small group residences, and a gymnasium. Also during his tenure, Wheeling College first received accreditation without reservation from the North Central Association of Colleges and Schools. In addition, summer school classes first began. In the last years of his term as president, Troy announced the start of a $5 million expansion program, with funds for a library, campus center, theater, and two more students residence halls. Academically, he is remembered for his emphasis on the liberal arts within a "collegial setting."

During his presidency, Troy was Vice President of the West Virginia Association of Colleges and University Presidents and also of the West Virginia Foundation for Independent Colleges. He also served as President of the West Virginia Intercollegiate Athletic Conference and the Wheeling Area Council. Besides his work at the college, while residing in Wheeling, Troy served as President of the Wheeling Area Conference on Community Development, and President of the Oglebay Institute. In addition, he served on the boards of the Iroquois Council of Boy Scouts of America, the United Fund, and the Community Chest of Wheeling.

In summer 1966, Troy left the office of President of Wheeling College. His legacy remains in the university theater, which today bears his name.

=== Later life and death ===
After leaving Wheeling, Troy went to Baltimore, Maryland, to work at the regional headquarters of the Jesuits' Maryland Province. There, he directed the graduate studies and career preparations of young Jesuits, 300 to 400 in number.

Troy died on 14 November 1967 at the Gonzaga Villa in Cape May, New Jersey, at the age of 47.
