= Alma Grace McDonough Health and Recreation Center =

Multipurpose arena in West Virginia

- "The Birdcage" "The Birdbath"
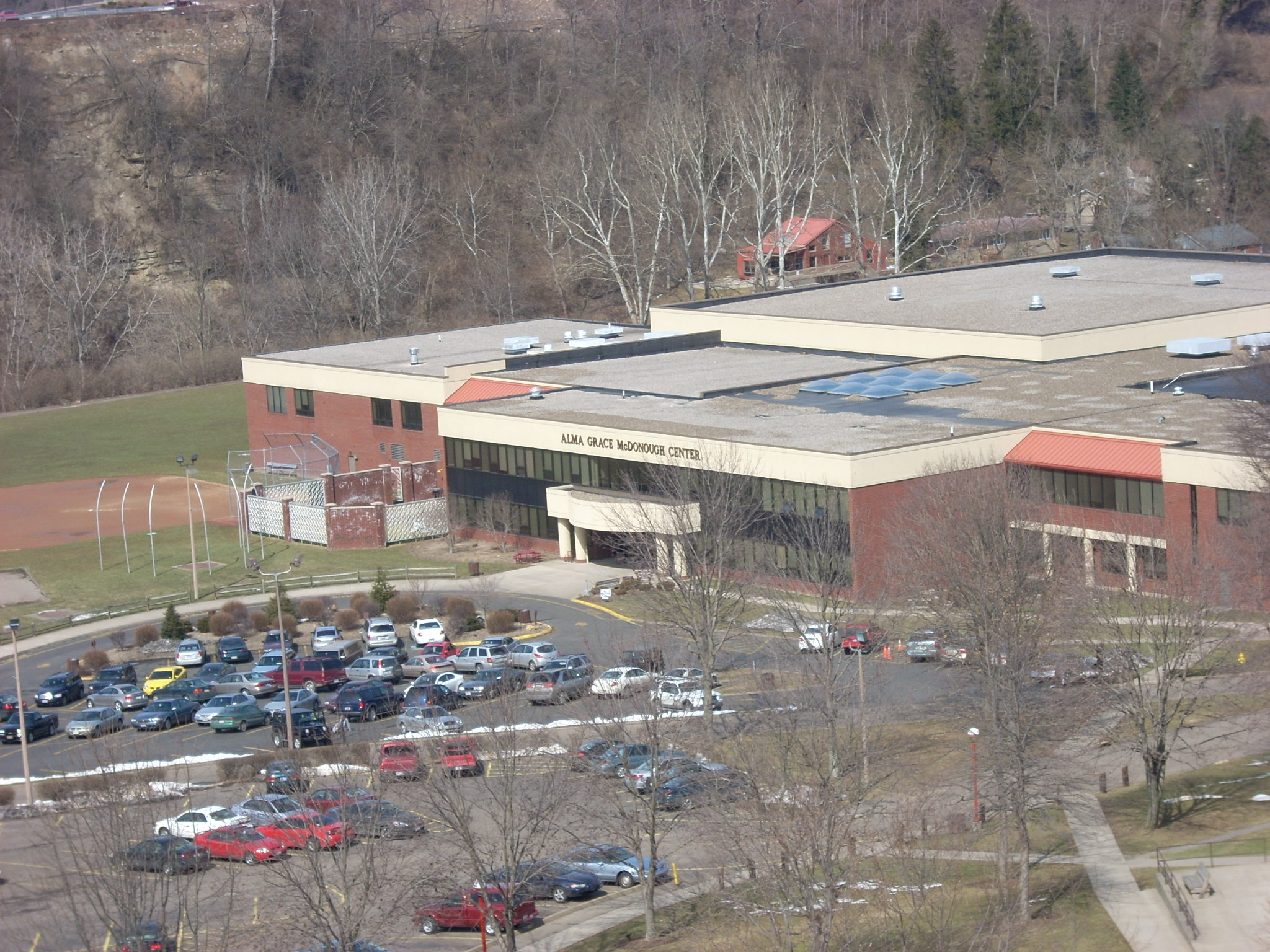
- Interactive map of Alma Grace McDonough Health and Recreation Center
- Location: 316 Washington Ave. Wheeling, WV 26003
- Coordinates: 40.0741478°N 80.6915454°W
- Owner: Wheeling University
- Capacity: 2,200

Construction
- Groundbreaking: April 1992
- Opened: November 1993
- Cost: $6 million

Tenant
- Wheeling Cardinals (1993-present)

The Alma Grace McDonough Health and Recreation Center is a 2,200 seat multipurpose arena and recreation facility on the campus of Wheeling University in Wheeling, West Virginia. The building was constructed thanks to a gift from Alma Grace McDonough, whom the building is named after.

The 107,000-square-foot (9,900 m^{2}) facility is home to the university's men's and women's basketball teams, swimming teams, and the volleyball team. In addition, the facility is home to WU's athletic training and physical therapy programs, a wellness center, fitness center, and the university alumni center.

In addition to university programs, the McDonough Center has also hosted the AIDS Memorial Quilt, and hosts an annual college fair.
