= Wet Seal =

American online corporation

Wet Seal, Inc.

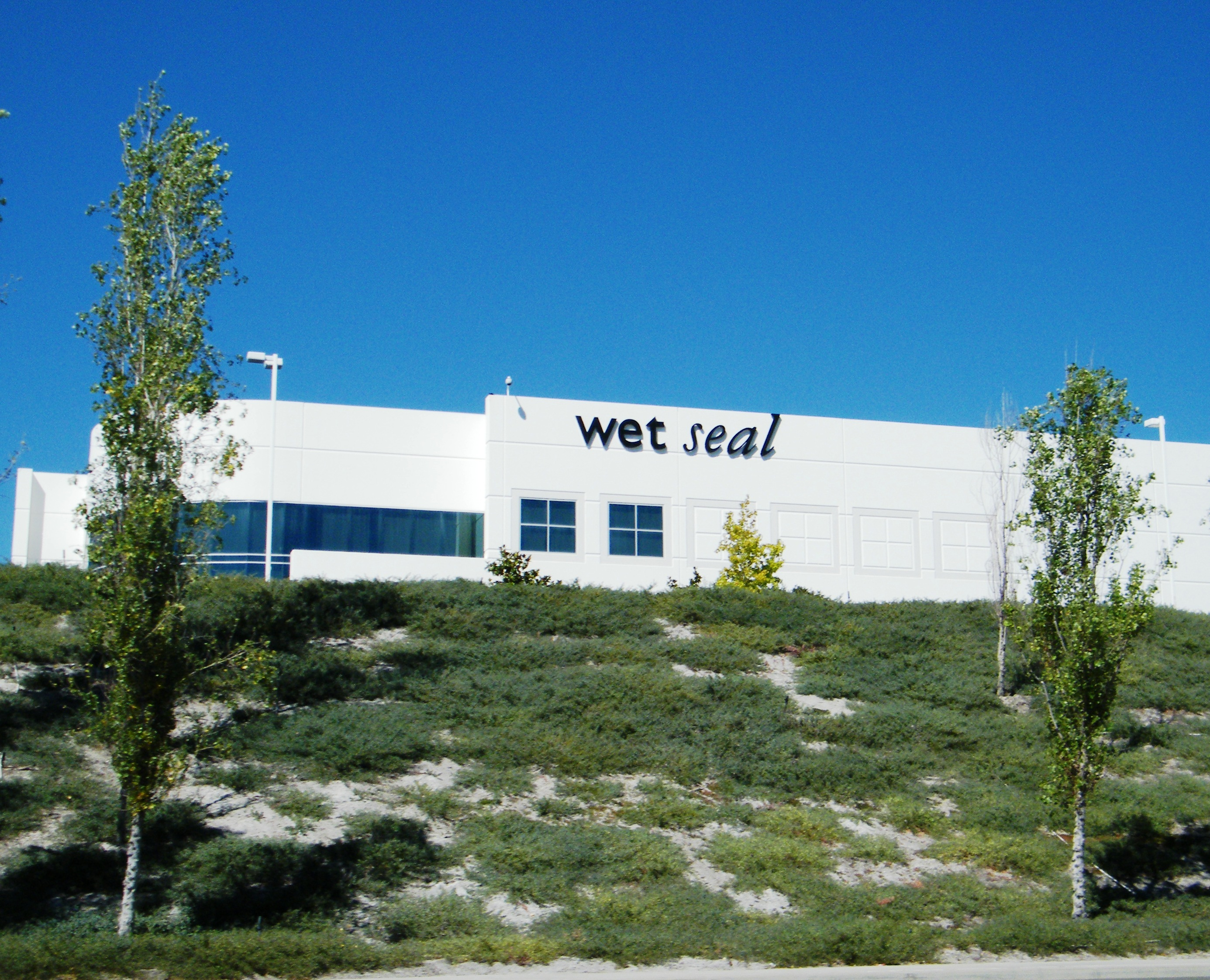
- Former Wet Seal headquarters in Foothill Ranch, California (2010)
- Formerly: Lorne's (1962–1990)
- Type: Private
- Industry: Retail
- Founded: 1962; 64 years ago
- Defunct: January 27, 2017; 9 years ago
- Fate: Chapter 11 bankruptcy and liquidation
- Headquarters: Los Angeles, California
- Number of locations: 540 at peak
- Key people: CEO: Ramez Toubassy
- Products: Apparel, Accessories, Footwear
- Parent: Gordon Brothers

Wet Seal was an American fast fashion retailer, headquartered in Los Angeles, California. The retailer specialized in selling clothing and accessories. The company was founded in Newport Beach, California, by Lorne Huycke in 1962 as "Lorne's". The "Wet Seal" name is derived from a comment Huycke's wife made during a fashion show that a model wearing a bathing suit looked like a "wet seal." The company was incorporated as Wet Seal in 1990.

== History ==
=== 1995–2014 ===
In 1995, Wet Seal acquired 237 'Contempo Casuals stores from the Neiman Marcus Group. Contempo Casuals would continue to use its own name until 2001 when the remaining stores were converted into Wet Seal stores. The company then launched the Arden B. brand in November 1998 and changed most of the remaining Contempo Casual names to Arden B. In June 2010, the Blink by Wet Seal concept was announced. By 2014, the company had 478 Wet Seal stores and 54 Arden B stores across 48 states and Puerto Rico. In 2014 Wet Seal announced that it would close all the Arden B stores by 2015.

The Wet Seal, Inc. and its subsidiaries operated as a specialty retailer of apparel and accessory items for women in the United States. It operated three mall-based chains of retail stores under the Wet Seal, Arden B, and Blink by Wet Seal brands. The company's Wet Seal stores offered apparel and accessories for teenage girls. The Arden B. stores provided feminine, contemporary collections of fashion separates and accessories until 2015. Blink stores focused on denim products for the same teenage girl demographic as Wet Seal but with store sizes of 1,600 square feet (150 m^{2}) versus the 4,000 square feet (370 m^{2}) of Wet Seal. It also operated web-based stores, which included www.thewetseal.com that offered Wet Seal merchandise; and www.ardenb.com, which offered Arden B apparel and accessories. As of January 30, 2010, the company operated 504 retail stores in 47 states, including 424 Wet Seal stores and 80 Arden B stores. The Wet Seal, Inc. was founded in 1962 and is based in Foothill Ranch, California.

The chain made a failed attempt to purchase County Seat in 1996.

Wet Seal typically served the same audience and competed with Forever 21 and Charlotte Russe.

In 2013, Wet Seal laid off 35 employees, mostly at the headquarters, due to competition from Forever 21 in order to save $3.8 million (~$5.03 million in 2024) a year.

In 2013, Wet Seal reached a $7.5 million (~$9.93 million in 2024) settlement with minority plaintiffs who charged that the company directed managers to fire African American employees who they thought did not fit the company's brand image which is the "Armani look, white, blond hair and blue eyes."

=== 2015–present: Bankruptcy and liquidation ===
In January 2015, because of increased competition in the teen clothing sector, Wet Seal shuttered a number of stores despite previously indicating to employees that the outlets would stay open. Employees responded to this termination procedure by posting signs in the front windows outlining the way that Wet Seal management communicated the closures to staff and the relatively paltry compensation received. Share price of the company's stock, WTSL, dropped to $0.06.

On January 16, 2015, the company filed for Chapter 11 bankruptcy protection in the United States Bankruptcy Court for the Central District of California.

On January 27, 2017, Business Insider and other news outlets reported that Wet Seal was closing all of its stores immediately and terminating all staff and employees, part of an American retail phenomenon of store closures known as the retail apocalypse. The brand was acquired by Gordon Brothers. It is now operating as an online-only retailer.
