= Wheeling University =

Catholic university in Wheeling, West Virginia, US

Coordinates: 40°04′23″N 80°41′22″W

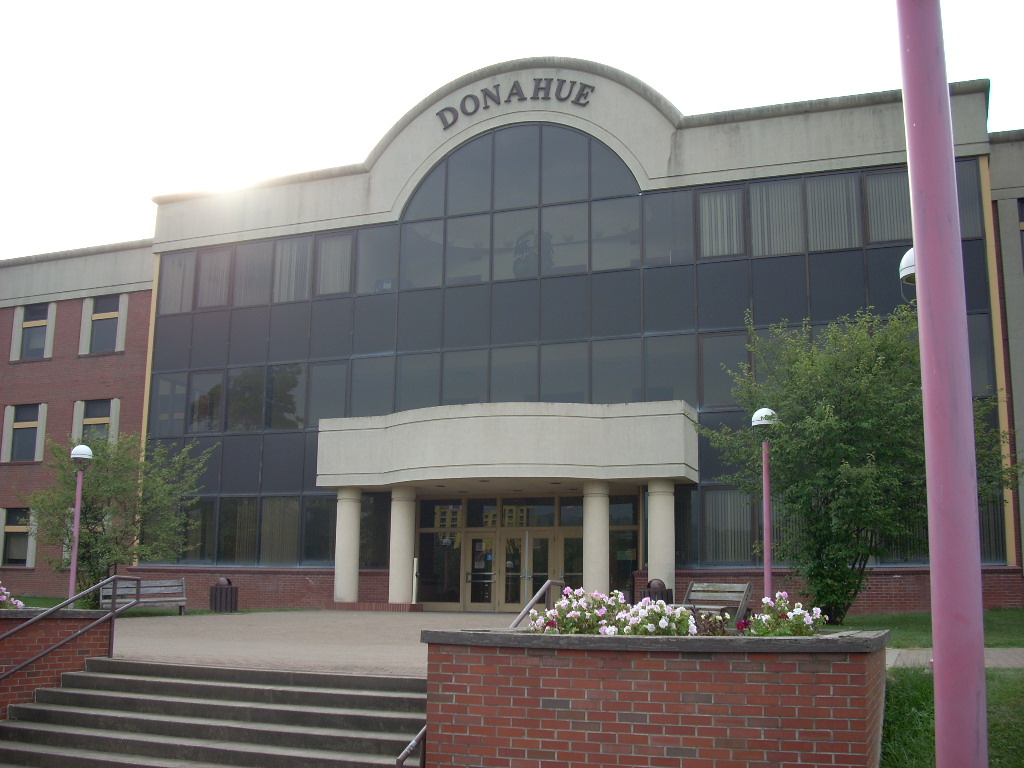
- WU's Donahue Hall
- Former names: Wheeling College (1954–1987); Wheeling Jesuit College (1987–1996); Wheeling Jesuit University (1996–2019)
- Motto: Luceat Lux Vestra (Latin)
- Motto in English: Let your light shine
- Type: Private university
- Established: 1954; 72 years ago
- Religious affiliation: Catholic Church
- Academic affiliations: ACCU; NAICU CIC
- President: Dianna Vargo
- Students: 774 (fall 2024)
- Undergraduates: 619 (fall 2024)
- Postgraduates: 155 (fall 2024)
- Location: Wheeling, West Virginia, U.S.
- Campus: 65 acres (26.3 ha)
- Newspaper: Cardinal Connection
- Colors: Red, white, and black
- Nickname: Cardinals
- Sporting affiliations: NCAA Division II - MEC
- Mascot: Iggy the Cardinal
- Website: wheeling.edu
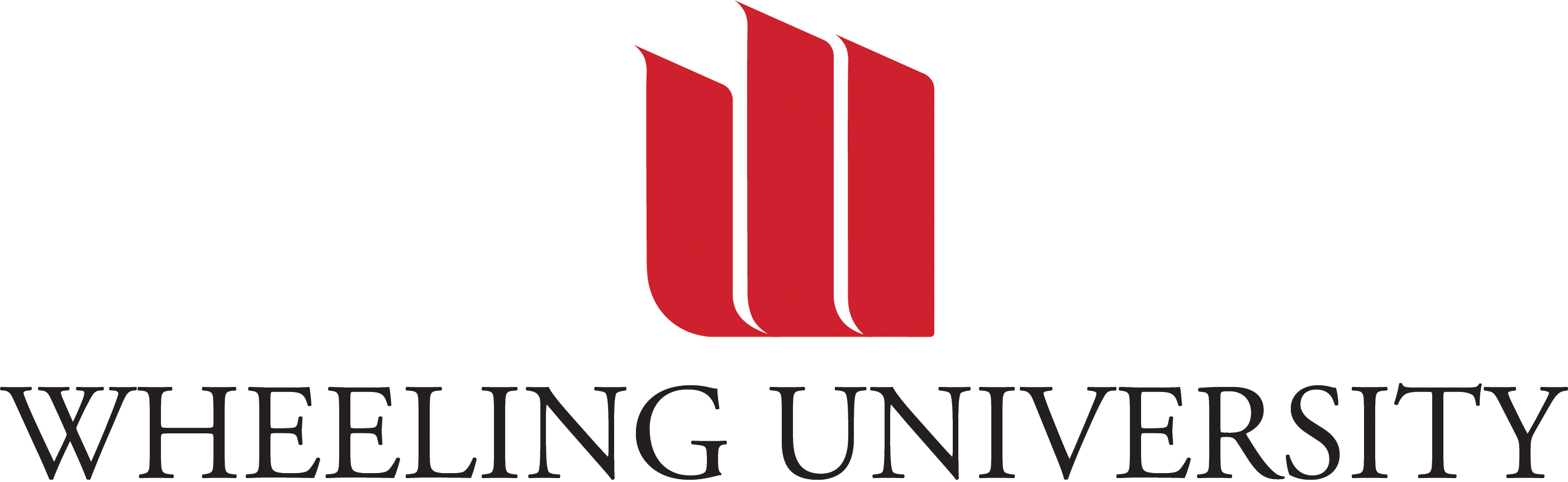

Wheeling University (WU, formerly Wheeling Jesuit University) is a private Catholic university in Wheeling, West Virginia, United States. It was founded as "Wheeling College" in 1954 by the Society of Jesus (also known as the Jesuits) and was a Jesuit institution until 2019. Wheeling University competes in Division II of the National Collegiate Athletic Association as a member of the Mountain East Conference.

== History ==
Richard Whelan, bishop of the Diocese of Wheeling, lobbied the Society of Jesus in the 19th century to establish a university in the growing city. Over a century later, Whelan's original vision came to fruition. After a donor, Sara Tracy, left her estate to the diocese, it purchased land for a Jesuit college from Mt. De Chantal Visitation Academy.

Wheeling College was founded through a partnership of the Diocese of Wheeling-Charleston with the Maryland Province of the Society of Jesus. Ground was broken on November 24, 1953, and the college was officially incorporated on September 25, 1954. It opened to students on September 26, 1955. The establishment of the college required $2.75 million in start-up costs. Overcoming the difficulties of temporary facilities and a faculty of twelve Jesuit priests and four lay professors, the school grew considerably.

For the 1987–1988 school year, the university became Wheeling Jesuit College, and in July 1996, gained university status.

In 2012, university leadership was accused by the federal government of misappropriating NASA grant money received for sponsored programs. Wheeling Jesuit settled with the federal government in 2015, paying $2.3 million in restitution.

In March 2013, the university announced the selection of James Fleming as its tenth president. Fleming took office effective July 1, 2013. Fleming resigned from the presidency on January 3, 2017.

In 2019, the school eliminated majors in history, theology, philosophy, literature, and engineering and cut 20 of the university's full-time faculty members.

=== Jesuit heritage ===
Prior to 2019, the Jesuit community was active in the process of education at Wheeling. In addition, the Jesuits were involved in many other academic works, such as the Appalachian Institute on campus. Members of Wheeling's Jesuit Community reside at Whelan Hall, dedicated in 1955. The Jesuit community and tradition for critical thinking were reflected in the school's curriculum and mission. Wheeling Jesuit University was a member of the Association of Jesuit Colleges and Universities.

In April 2019, as part of a broader restructuring of its academic programs, the university announced the elimination of its programs in theology and philosophy that are key to its identity as a Jesuit institution. The Jesuits in turn decided to end their academic affiliation with the university at the end of the 2018–2019 academic year, while continuing to provide "an ongoing Jesuit presence" through its campus ministry and other programs. Two months later, Monsignor Kevin Quirk resigned from his position as chair of the university's board of trustees after The Washington Post published details from a confidential report alleging that one of his former colleagues was guilty of sexual abuse and financial impropriety. In July, the university formally dropped "Jesuit" from its name and became Wheeling University.

=== Presidents ===
- Lawrence R. McHugh, 1954–1959
- William F. Troy, 1959–1966
- Frank R. Haig, 1966–1972
- Charles L. Currie Jr., 1972–1982
- Thomas S. Acker, 1982–2000
- George Lundy, 2000–2003
- Joseph R. Hacala, 2003–2006
- James F. Birge, (interim), 2006–2007
- Julio Giulietti, 2007–2009
- Davitt McAteer (acting), 2009–2010
- Francis Marie Thrailkill (interim), 2010
- Richard A. Beyer, 2011–2013
- James J. Fleming, 2013–2017
- Debra M. Townsley, 2017–2018
- Mark Phillips, interim, summer 2018
- Michael P. Mihalyo, Jr., 2018–2019
- Ginny Favede, 2019–2024
- Dianna Vargo, 2024–present

== Admissions and rankings ==
According to the Wheeling University's page on the U-CAN Network, the average high school GPA of the freshman class is 3.5 The school is given a selectivity score of 81 out of 100 by the Princeton Review. In 1997, WJU was named as the fourth-best educational value in the southeast, and the 15th-best college in the region. In addition, the school is ranked as the 18th best master's university in the South by U.S. News & World Report. The 2009 Forbes magazine ranking placed WJU as 180 of 600 colleges, a marked improvement from their No. 437 rank in 2008. Forbes ranked the university as the 79th best value in America. The university is ranked among the John Templeton Foundation's Colleges that Encourage Character Development.

== Academics ==
Wheeling University is accredited by the Higher Learning Commission.

In honor of former professor Stephen J. Laut, the university offers the Laut Honors Program. Throughout each school year, members of the program meet to discuss and study material related to that year's theme. At the conclusion of a student's sophomore year, students who have successfully completed the Laut program are invited to join the Ignatian Honors Seminar, a more rigorous program for which only six juniors and six seniors are selected.

=== Graduate programs ===
Wheeling University's Center for Professional and Graduate Studies offers five graduate programs, a Master of Business Administration; a Master of Accountancy; a Master of Science in Nursing; a Master of Science in Organizational Leadership; and a Doctor of Physical Therapy.

The Center for Professional and Graduate Studies offers a Bachelor of Arts in Organizational Leadership and Development (BOLD) and a Master of Science in Organizational Leadership (MSOL). These are adult education programs that meet once a week in the evening.

=== Appalachian Institute ===
Founded in September 2002, The Appalachian Institute is a pastoral and academic response of Wheeling University to the Appalachian bishops’ pastoral letters, This Land is Home to Me (1975 - on power and powerlessness in Appalachia) and At Home in the Web of Life (1995 - on sustainability). Focused on advocacy, culture, education, research and service through the mode of immersion, as matters of social justice, the Appalachian Institute grounds its mission as a responsible and sustainable partner for the university and the Diocese of Wheeling-Charleston invigorating the Catholic social mission as an available instrument of Catholic social teaching, and as a positive force for growing sustainable relationships with community partners locally, nationwide & internationally. The Appalachian Institute at Wheeling University has focused on issues such as Appalachian health, hope, education, economic and energy development, and issues related to coal impoundment, conducting research and producing exhibits regarding these issues.

In 2010, the university hosted the Ignatian Solidarity Network Spring Teach-In, which focused on issues of environmental sustainability and stewardship. In September 2010, the Appalachian Institute held its second annual Appalachian Film Festival.

=== Institute for the Study of Capitalism and Morality ===
As a result of a donation from BB&T, in 2006 the university became home to the Institute for the Study of Capitalism and Morality. According to its website, the Institute desires to study the roles of capitalism in a free society. The institute also promotes research and essay competitions, forums and debates, and a lecture series.

=== Academic facilities ===
Named for the school's former president Thomas S. Acker, the Acker Science Center was built in 2002. It is home to classrooms and labs.

The oldest academic building on campus, Donahue Hall was constructed in 1955 and was renovated in 1988. Donahue holds faculty offices, labs, and classrooms. The hall is connected to the Acker Science Center via the "Acker bridge."

== Mount de Chantal Conservatory of Music ==
The adjacent former girls' academy, Mount de Chantal Visitation Academy, ceased operations in August 2010 and the Sisters of the Visitation, who ran the school since its inception, moved to the monastery at Georgetown Visitation Preparatory School in Washington, D.C. Wishing to see the Mount's legacy continued, the sisters gifted a large sum of money to establish and fund a Conservatory of Music at the university.

Thus the Mount de Chantal Conservatory of Music came to be in the lower floor of the university's CET building. The Conservatory features a recital hall, practice rooms, a parlor for students and visitors, and a gallery displaying art, antiques and archival materials from Mount de Chantal Visitation Academy. Each year, one incoming female freshman receives a $10,000 Mount de Chantal Scholarship, renewable annually, through the Mount de Chantal Fine Arts Education Fund.

== Athletics ==
The Wheeling athletic teams are called the Cardinals. The university is a member of the Division II level of the National Collegiate Athletic Association (NCAA), primarily competing in the Mountain East Conference (MEC) as a founding member since the 2013–14 academic year. The Cardinals previously competed in the defunct West Virginia Intercollegiate Athletic Conference (WVIAC) from 1957–58 to 2012–13.

Wheeling competes in 19 intercollegiate varsity sports: Men's sports include baseball, basketball, cross country, football, golf, lacrosse, D1A rugby, soccer, swimming, track & field and wrestling; while women's sports include basketball, cross country, golf, soccer, softball, swimming, track & field and volleyball. Former sports included women's lacrosse.

In 2024, the Wheeling men's rugby team completed an unbeaten season in 7s rugby and was named National Champions in the Premier Division at the Collegiate Rugby Championship 7s Tournament in Boyds, Maryland.

The university's home indoor athletic events for volleyball and basketball are held in WU's McDonough Center. WU's football, soccer, and women's lacrosse teams play on the turfed Bishop Schmitt Field. The Cardinals baseball and softball teams call the J.B. Chambers Complex located off campus located along I-470 as their home fields.

== Campus life ==
Wheeling University's campus features fifteen buildings, six of which are residence halls:

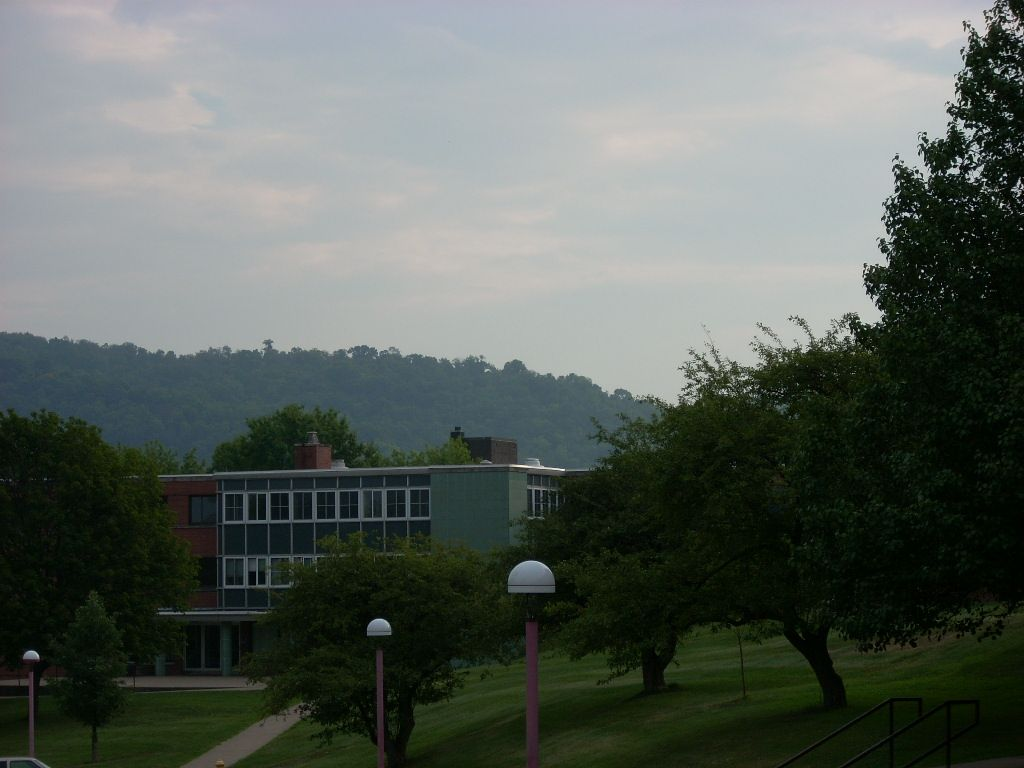
Looking toward Campion and McHugh Residence Halls on WU's campus

- Campion – Housing for male freshman and upperclassmen students with one floor for female students
- McHugh – Housing for male freshman students
- Ignatius – Upgraded co-ed housing for upperclass students, featuring an "Ace Floor" for approved, academically achieved students with around-the-clock quiet hours
- Kirby – Upgraded housing for female students, occasionally freshmen
- Sara Tracy – Housing for female freshman students
- Steenrod – Apartment housing for graduate students, off the main campus but on university-owned property across Washington Avenue.

=== Student organizations and publications ===
==== Student government ====
The Student Government Association offices are located in Swint Hall. The Student Government Association is the elected voice of WU students. The Wheeling SGA consists of two branches: the executive board ("E-Board") and the Student Senate. The E-Board consists of a President and Vice President, Secretary, Treasurer, Student Advocate, Social Affairs Representative, Academic Affairs Representative, and Academic Affairs Representative. The Student Senate is composed of at-large representatives, class officers, and a commuter representative.

==== Organizations ====
Wheeling University students are given an array of opportunities for campus involvement. Student Government and the Campus Activities Board plan activities each year, in addition to those already put on by clubs. While many of the clubs are service-oriented in nature, there are also political, artistic, and major-related organizations.

=== Campus traditions ===
==== Culture Fest ====
Each spring Wheeling's International Student club sponsors a festival celebrating the cultural diversity of WU. The activities included samples of ethnic food as well as music and demonstrations from students' native countries.

==== Last Blast ====
"Last Blast" is held at the end of every school year. The events include a concert, a formal dance, a carnival held outside of Donahue Hall, and a raft race down Wheeling Creek. Some of the artists at past Last Blast concerts include Andy Grammer and Punchline.

==== Jesuit Idol ====
Jesuit Idol is an annual talent competition modeled after American Idol and held every spring semester. Contestants sing before a live audience and a panel of judges, and are eliminated in a series of themed rounds. The winner is awarded a cash prize. The event is streamed online.

== People ==
=== Notable alumni ===
- John Beilein (1975), professional basketball coach
- Lionel Cartwright (1982), country musician
- Haywood Highsmith (2018), professional basketball player
- Ginny Favede, academic administrator who was the 13th president of Wheeling University
- John M. Maris, (1983), chief of Division of Oncology and Director of the Center for Childhood Cancer Research at the Children's Hospital of Philadelphia
- Remy Munasifi, comedian and musical artist
- Tim Murphy, (1974), U.S. representative for Pennsylvania's 18th District
- George Novacky (1968), assistant department chair and senior lecturer in computer science, University of Pittsburgh.
- Christina Richey (2004), cross-divisional program officer, NASA Headquarters; deputy program scientist, OSIRIS-REx spacecraft mission
- Kathleen Hawk Sawyer (1972), director, Federal Bureau of Prisons, 1992–2003
- Erikka Lynn Storch (1996), member, West Virginia House of Delegates
- Jason H. Wilson, Ohio state senator
- James T Smith (1964), Baltimore County, Maryland, county executive
- Tara Wilson (2000), Miss West Virginia USA
- JT Woodruff (did not graduate), lead singer of Hawthorne Heights
- Pete Bi (2010), Chief Financial Officer at Community Options Inc.

=== Notable faculty and staff ===
- J. Donald Freeze, former philosophy professor and academic vice president of Georgetown University
- Alfred Jolson, former business professor and Bishop of Reykjavík
- Jim O'Brien, professional basketball coach

== See also ==
- List of Jesuit sites
