= Charleston Coliseum & Convention Center =

Building in West Virginia, United States

- "The Center of it All"

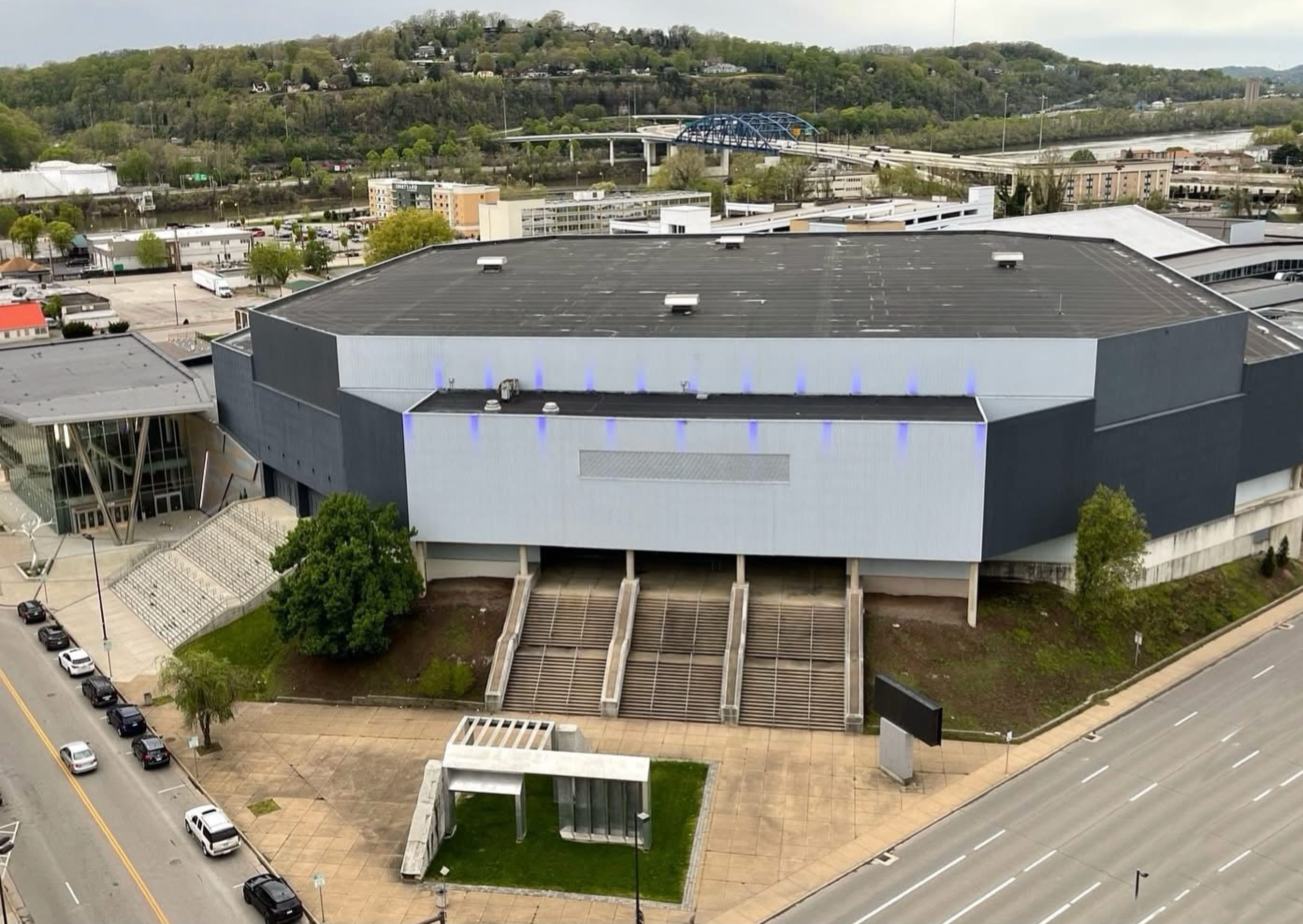
- Exterior of venue (c. 2021)

- Location in West Virginia Location in the United States
- Interactive map of Charleston Coliseum & Convention Center
- Former names: Charleston Civic Center (1959–2018)
- Address: 200 Civic Center Dr
- Location: Charleston, West Virginia
- Coordinates: 38°21′19″N 81°38′29″W
- Owner: City of Charleston
- Operator: Oak View Group
- Capacity: Concerts: 13,247; Basketball: 12,337; Boxing/Wrestling: 13,600 Additional capacity: Municipal Auditorium: 3,483; Charleston Theater: 770
- Parking: 2,000 spaces

Construction
- Built: 1957-1959
- Opened: January 1959
- Renovated: 1983; 2000; 2006; 2015-18; 2025
- Expanded: 1968; 1980; 2000; 2015-18
- Cost: $3 million ($33.5 million in 2025 dollars)

Website
- Venue Website
- Building details

General information
- Renovated: July 1978 – October 1983
- Renovation cost: $33 million ($163 million in 2025 dollars)
- Building details

General information
- Renovated: June 2015 – October 2018
- Renovation cost: $110.3 million ($150 million in 2025 dollars)

Renovating team
- Architects: ZMM Architects & Engineers; tvsdesign
- Renovating firm: BBL Carlton; tvsdesign
- Engineer: ZMM Architects & Engineers
- Main contractor: BBL Carlton

The Charleston Coliseum & Convention Center (originally known as the Charleston Civic Center) is a municipal event complex located in downtown Charleston, West Virginia, United States. Opened in 1959, the facility includes a multi-purpose coliseum, a theater, the Charleston Municipal Auditorium, and a convention center. The venue hosts concerts, sporting events, trade shows, conventions, and community activities.

== History ==
In 1953, Charleston voters approved a series of general obligation bonds to fund the construction of a civic center on the banks of the Elk River, between Lee Street and Quarrier Street. The original Civic Center opened in January 1959 at a cost of $3 million and included a 6,000-seat arena and a 770-seat "Little Theater."

The first expansion, costing $1.8 million, occurred in 1968 and added 2,400 seats to the grand arena. The project also included the installation of air conditioning and the construction of a recreational ice skating rink.

In the mid-1970s, city officials recognized that for Charleston to establish itself as a regional entertainment and convention center, expanded public assembly facilities were necessary. They decided to construct a new coliseum with a two-story lobby connecting it to the existing Civic Center. The existing Civic Center would then be renovated into a first-class convention center, featuring meeting rooms, exhibit halls, and major banquet facilities.

Ground was broken on July 24, 1978, for the 13,500-seat coliseum and lobby. The $19 million project was financed through federal funding, a $10 million general obligation bond issue was approved by Charleston citizens. The coliseum was completed in 1980, with the rock band Queen performing the first show at the new venue on August 16, 1980.

In 1994, the 36,000-square-foot (3,300 m^{2}) Grand Hall of the convention center received new ceiling, paint, and lighting. The ice rink was converted into an exhibit hall in 2001. Between 2004 and 2006, approximately $250,000 was spent renovating the Little Theater.

In May 2015, the Charleston Municipal Planning Commission approved permits for a $72 million comprehensive expansion and renovation project. Construction began in September 2015 and was expected to be completed in early 2018, with the Civic Center remaining open during construction.

On September 26, 2018, it was announced that the Charleston Civic Center would be renamed the Charleston Coliseum & Convention Center.

In February 2024, the Charleston Municipal Auditorium was temporarily closed due to health and safety concerns. In January 2025, the Charleston City Council set aside $1 million to fund the next assessment of the 86-year-old building. The study will help determine what to do with the facade, which is considered a historical artifact.

In January 2025, Charleston City Council approved a resolution to replace the original seats at the Coliseum, which had remained in place since the arena's opening in 1983. The installation of the new seating was announced in August 2025.

On October 13, 2026, it was announced that through a new 10-year partnership, Vandalia Health secured the naming rights with the Charleston Coliseum & Convention Center to be renamed as Vandalia Health Center.

== Facilities ==
The Charleston Coliseum & Convention Center complex includes several venues:

- The Charleston Coliseum, a multi-purpose arena with seating for up to 13,500 and more than 30,500 square feet of flexible event space.

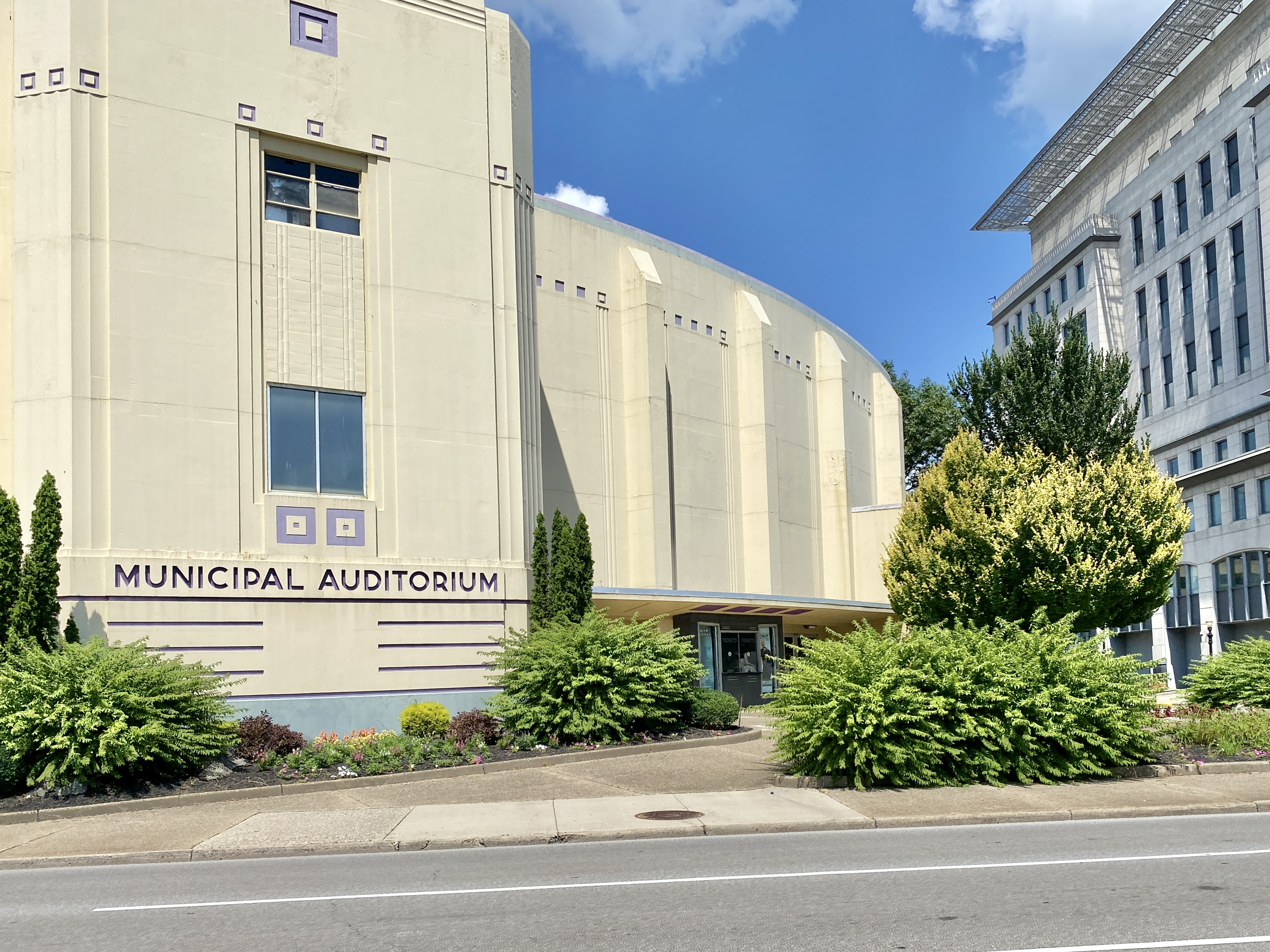
Charleston Municipal Auditorium (c. 2023)

- The Charleston Municipal Auditorium, originally built in 1939, is currently closed due to health and safety concerns. When open, it was used for performances and lectures and had a seating capacity of 3,483.
- The Charleston Theater, a performance venue with a seating capacity of 770.
- Additional meeting rooms and smaller event spaces.

Accessibility and modern amenities are provided throughout the complex.

== Sports and entertainment ==
The Charleston Coliseum has hosted numerous sporting events, including the WVSSAC Boys and Girls State Basketball Tournaments, the WVSSAC High School Volleyball State Tournament, the WVSSAC Cheerleading State Championships, and several West Virginia University games, such as the annual Capital Classic rivalry against Marshall University which was held in Charleston from 1989 to 2015.

The arena hosted the Mountain East Conference men's basketball tournament, part of NCAA Division II, from 2014 to 2018, and previously hosted the West Virginia Intercollegiate Athletic Conference men’s basketball tournament, also part of NCAA Division II, from 1959 until the conference dissolved in 2013. The coliseum has also served as a regional host site for The Basketball Tournament (TBT) in 2021, 2022, and 2025.

On December 6, 2025, West Virginia Mountaineers men's basketball returned to the Charleston Coliseum for the first time in nine years, facing Wake Forest for the “2025 GoMart Holiday Hoopsfest." Wake Forest prevailed, 75-66, in front of an announced crowd of 10,221.

The complex hosts a wide range of annual and one-time events. Notable recurring events include:

Event	Type	Typical Month	Notes
WVSSAC Boys' State Basketball Championships	Sports	March	State championship tournament
WVSSAC Girls' State Basketball Championships	Sports	March	State championship tournament
WVSSAC Volleyball State Championships	Sports	November	State championship tournament
WVSSAC Cheerleading Championships	Sports	December	State championship tournament
West Virginia Hunting and Fishing Show	Trade show	January	Statewide attendees
West Virginia Association of Fairs & Festivals Conference	Conference	January	Industry event
West Virginia International Auto Show	Trade show	February	Automotive exhibits
Capital City Arts & Craft Show	Festival	November	Arts and crafts

=== Concerts ===
List of notable concerts held at the Charleston Coliseum & Convention Center in Charleston, West Virginia

Notable concerts at the Charleston Coliseum & Convention Center

Artist	Year(s)
AC/DC	1977, 1978, 1979, 1988, 1991, 1996
Aerosmith	1974, 1975, 1978, 1986, 1987, 1989, 1994, 1998
The Beach Boys	1968, 1975, 1982, 1984, 1985, 1987, 2015
Black Stone Cherry	2024
Black Sabbath	1972, 1977, 1980
Blue Öyster Cult	1972, 1975, 1976
Bob Seger & The Silver Bullet Band	1975, 1976, 1977, 1996, 2006, 2015
Bon Jovi	1984, 1985, 1989
Boston	1977, 1978
Brad Paisley	2003, 2005, 2007, 2008, 2014
Breaking Benjamin	2005, 2023, 2025
Brooks & Dunn	1998, 2010, 2022
Bush	2023
Carrie Underwood	2010, 2013, 2023
The Cars	1979
Chicago	1969, 1970, 1971, 1974, 2018, 2021
Cheap Trick	1979, 1980, 2025
Cher	2003
Chevelle	2006
Chris Stapleton	2017, 2019, 2022
Cinderella	1986
Collective Soul	1995
Creed	2002
The Cult	1989
Daryl Hall & John Oates	1983
Dave Matthews Band	1996, 1999
David Bowie	1974,
Dolly Parton	2016
Dokken	1985, 1987, 1989, 1995
Def Leppard	1983, 1987, 1992
Dwight Yoakam	1994, 1996, 2014, 2024
Eagles	1975, 1995, 2005
Electric Light Orchestra	1976, 1981
Elton John	1972, 1997, 2014
Elvis Presley	1975 (2x), 1976
Falling in Reverse	2023
Fleetwood Mac	1975
Foreigner	1978, 1981, 1985, 2021, 2024
Garth Brooks	1992, 1997, 2016
George Strait	2005, 2006, 2008
Godsmack	2007, 2024
Hank Williams Jr	1986, 1987, 1988, 1990, 1993, 1996, 1999, 2007, 2010, 2012
Heart	1983, 1986, 1987, 2025
Hootie & the Blowfish	2005
Huey Lewis & the News	1984, 1985, 1987
Incubus	2002
Jason Aldean	2010, 2011, 2013, 2015, 2020
Jelly Roll	2023, 2024
Jefferson Airplane	1967
The Jimi Hendrix Experience	1969
Johnny Cash	1959, 1966, 1968, 1971, 1976
Journey	1975, 1983, 1986, 2024
Judas Priest	2022
Keith Urban	2008, 2009, 2013, 2022
Kevin Gates	2021, 2022
Kid Rock	2004
Kiss	1975, 1976, 1978, 1983, 1986, 1988, 1990, 1992, 1997, 1998, 2000
Lana Del Rey	2023
Led Zeppelin	1970
Lil Wayne	2024
Loverboy	1981, 1982, 1983, 1986, 2024
Ludacris	2024
Luke Bryan	2013, 2016, 2022, 2025
Lynyrd Skynyrd	1974, 1975, 1977, 1988, 1995, 1998, 2000, 2011, 2021, 2024
Martina McBride	2004, 2007, 2023
Matchbox Twenty	2013
Metallica	1986, 1989, 1992
Miranda Lambert	2006, 2011, 2012, 2015, 2019
Motionless in White	2022, 2023
Morgan Wallen	2017, 2020, 2022
Mötley Crüe	1990, 2006
Nickelback	2006
Ozzy Osbourne	1982, 1984, 1986, 1996
Poison	1987, 1989, 1991
The Police	1984
Queen	1980
Queensrÿche	1991, 2022
Ratt	1985, 1987, 1989
REO Speedwagon	1974, 1975, 1977, 1978, 1981, 1982, 1985, 2024
Rush	1974, 1979, 1980, 1983, 1984
Red Hot Chili Peppers	2000
Santana	1974
Scorpions	1984
Shinedown	2004, 2022
Skillet	2015, 2018, 2022, 2025
Staind	2005, 2025
Stone Temple Pilots	1993, 2000
Styx	1977, 1981, 1983, 2023
Taylor Swift	2009
Thirty Seconds to Mars	2002
Three Dog Night	1969, 1971, 1972, 1985
T.I.	2008, 2024
Tim McGraw	2000, 2003, 2004, 2006, 2018, 2024
Toby Keith	2002, 2006
Tool	2023
Van Halen	1980, 1981, 1984, 1986, 1995
Willie Nelson	1977, 1978, 1984, 1985, 1998
Yes	1976 (2x)
ZZ Top	1974, 1975, 1976, 1979, 1982, 1983, 1986, 1991, 1994, 2000, 2011, 2021, 2024

== Milestones and notable events ==
- December 13, 1958 – In the first basketball game ever played at the new Charleston Civic Center, No. 4 West Virginia, led by future Hall of Famer and Charleston area native Jerry West, was upset by Virginia 75–72.
- January 16, 1959 – Elgin Baylor star player of the Minneapolis Lakers, refused to play against the Cincinnati Royals due to the racial discrimination the team experienced at a Charleston hotel.
- 1960 – The Civic Center served as a significant stop during John F. Kennedy’s presidential campaign in West Virginia.
- February 6, 1961 – B.B. King became the first artist to perform live at the newly opened Charleston Civic Center.
- December 6, 1965 – In front of 6,000 spectators, West Virginia natives Jerry West and Hal Greer faced off against one another as the Philadelphia 76ers defeated the Los Angeles Lakers 116–107.
- February 7, 1966 – West Virginia upsets top-ranked Duke Blue Devils 94–90 before 5,800 fans.
- February 14, 1966 – Wilt Chamberlain of the Philadelphia 76ers broke the NBA’s all-time career scoring record of 20,884 points with a 41-point performance in a 149–123 win against the Detroit Pistons at the Civic Center.
- July 11–12, 1975, and July 24, 1976 – Elvis Presley performed three sellout shows at the Civic Center.
- August 16, 1980 – British rock band Queen performed the first concert at the newly renovated Civic Center Coliseum.
- March 17, 1994 – DuPont defeated Woodrow Wilson 85–81 in the West Virginia High School Boys Basketball State Tournament before a record crowd of 12,850. Future NFL Hall of Famer Randy Moss scored 33 points and future NBA player Jason Williams added 17 points with 11 assists, while Anthony Scruggs also had 33 and Gene Nabors scored 28.
- January 26, 2007 – O.J. Mayo allegedly bumped into referee Mike Lazo after being ejected from a Huntington game vs. Capital.
- March 2007 – Led by future NBA players O. J. Mayo (41 points) and Patrick Patterson, Huntington won its third consecutive Class AAA state championship with a 103–61 victory over South Charleston.
- November 21, 2007 – Top-ranked and defending national champions Tennessee, led by Hall of Famer Pat Summitt, defeated No. 16 West Virginia 67–49. Former South Charleston alumni Alexis Hornbuckle scored 12 points in the homecoming game.
- August 21, 2018 – President Donald Trump visited Charleston and held a rally in the Coliseum. He had also spoken at the venue during the 2016 presidential election.
- January 2025 – Charleston City Council approved a resolution to replace the original seats at the Coliseum, which had been in place since the venue opened in 1983. Installation of the new seating was announced in August 2025.
- August 9, 2025 – Senator Bernie Sanders addressed a standing-room crowd of 3,000 in the Grand Ballroom as part of his Fighting Oligarchy Tour.
