= Mountain East Conference =

U.S. college athletic conference

- Association: NCAA
- Founded: 2012
- Commissioner: Reid Amos (since 2012)
- Sports fielded: 23; men's: 11; women's: 12
- Division: Division II
- No. of teams: 12
- Headquarters: 207 Jefferson Street, Fairmont, West Virginia, United States
- Region: South; South Atlantic; Northeast; Mid-Atlantic; Midwest; East North Central
- Website: mountaineast.org

Locations
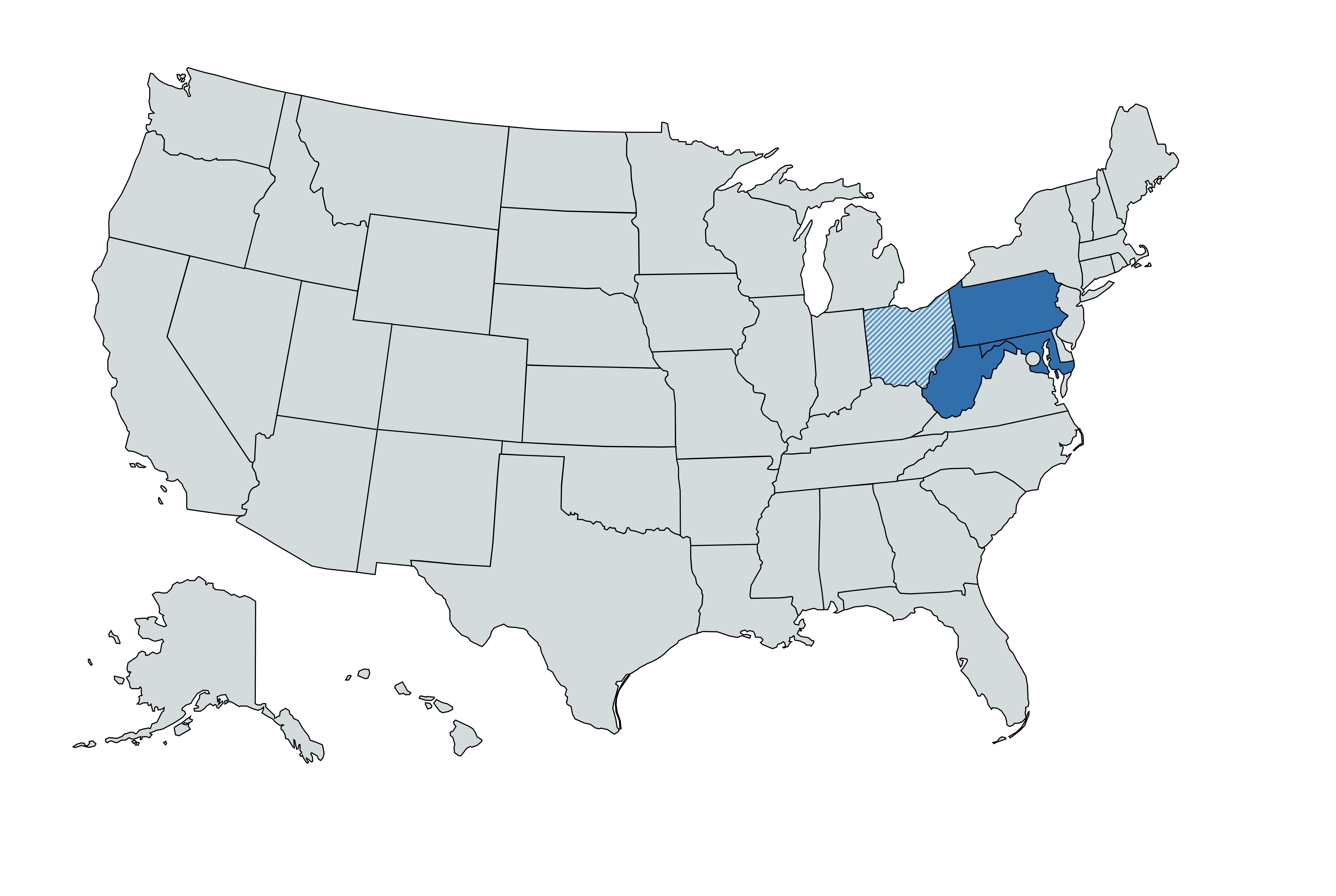

The Mountain East Conference (MEC) is a college athletic conference affiliated with the National Collegiate Athletic Association (NCAA) at the Division II level and officially began competition on September 1, 2013. It consists of 12 schools, mostly in West Virginia with other members in Maryland, Ohio, and Pennsylvania.

== Formation and history ==
Mountain East Conference
Location of MEC members: current

The conference is an offshoot of the West Virginia Intercollegiate Athletic Conference (WVIAC), another Division II conference that had operated primarily in West Virginia since 1924. In June 2012, the nine football-playing schools in that conference announced plans to break away and form a new all-sports conference. The schools that made the initial announcement were the University of Charleston, Concord University, Fairmont State University, Glenville State College (now a university), Seton Hill University, Shepherd University, West Liberty University, West Virginia State University, and West Virginia Wesleyan College. All of these schools were in West Virginia, except for Seton Hill, located in Pennsylvania. According to regional media, the split was "supposedly rooted in different philosophies of progressivism", and also was partially driven by a desire to expand the new conference's footprint outside West Virginia. The divisions in the WVIAC were also rooted in the split between public and private schools, although the departing schools included institutions of both types.

At the time of the original announcement, the nine schools planned to expand to at least 12 members. Before the official launch of the conference on August 20, 2012, the MEC sought to add the WVIAC's other Pennsylvania member, the University of Pittsburgh at Johnstown; however, both Seton Hill and Pittsburgh–Johnstown chose to join the Pennsylvania State Athletic Conference (PSAC). The MEC filled out its charter membership with another West Virginia school, Wheeling Jesuit University, today known as Wheeling University; two Ohio schools, Notre Dame College and Urbana University; and the University of Virginia's College at Wise (UVA Wise), located in Southwest Virginia. Wheeling Jesuit was a WVIAC member that had been left out of the original WVIAC split. Urbana and UVA Wise were members of the Great Midwest Athletic Conference (G-MAC) in 2012–13, while Notre Dame was a Division II independent that had housed five of its 22 sports in the Great Lakes Intercollegiate Athletic Conference. UVA Wise, which had previously been turned down for WVIAC membership, was transitioning from the NAIA and did not officially become an active D-II member until 2015-16; all of the other charter members were already full D-II members.

At its launch, the MEC had 11 football members, with Wheeling (then known as Wheeling Jesuit) being the only non-football school. On February 15, 2013, the NCAA accepted the MEC as its 25th D2 conference. The 2015–16 school year was the first in which MEC teams were eligible for automatic bids to NCAA Division II championships; before then, they were eligible only for at-large bids.

In 2018, UVA Wise and the South Atlantic Conference (SAC) jointly announced on April 13 that UVA Wise would leave the MEC to join the SAC for 2019–20 and beyond. Next, Shepherd and the PSAC jointly announced on June 7 that Shepherd would join the PSAC in 2019, becoming that league's first full member outside of Pennsylvania. The MEC would replace both members in the ensuing months. On July 5, the Mountain East Conference announced that Frostburg State University had accepted an offer of membership beginning with the 2019–20 academic year, contingent upon Frostburg State achieving active membership status in NCAA Division II (which would occur on the announced schedule). Finally, on August 30, the MEC announced two additional new members effective in 2019–20. Davis & Elkins College would become a full member, and the University of North Carolina at Pembroke (UNC Pembroke) would join in five sports. UNC Pembroke began MEC competition in men's and women's indoor track & field, women's swimming & diving, and wrestling in 2019, with football following in 2020.

Multiple MEC membership changes were announced in 2020. On April 16, multi-sport associate member UNC Pembroke announced it would join Conference Carolinas (CC) effective in 2021–22. Because CC sponsors all of the non-football sports that UNCP housed in the MEC but at the time did not sponsor football, UNCP remained an MEC member only in football, eventually fully leaving the MEC in 2025 when CC reinstated football as a sponsored sport. Five days later, charter member Urbana announced it would close at the end of the 2019–20 school year. Finally, on June 5, Alderson Broaddus University, a West Virginia school left out of the WVIAC split, announced that it would leave the G-MAC to join the MEC the following month. However, their tenure in the MEC was short-lived, as on July 31, 2023, Alderson Broaddus' authorization to grant degrees was revoked, resulting in the immediate suspension of all athletics.

In 2024, charter member Notre Dame College announced it would shut down. That same year, it was announced that Point Park University would join the conference from the NAIA River States Conference. This marked the MEC’s first member in Pennsylvania.

=== Chronological timeline ===
- 2013 – The Mountain East Conference was founded. Charter members included the University of Charleston, Concord University, Fairmont State University, Glenville State College (now Glenville State University), Notre Dame College of Ohio, Shepherd University, Urbana University, the University of Virginia's College at Wise (UVA Wise), West Liberty University, West Virginia State University, West Virginia Wesleyan College and Wheeling Jesuit University (now Wheeling University), beginning the 2013–14 academic year. Every member school (except UVA Wise, Notre Dame (Oh.) and Urbana) came from the defunct West Virginia Intercollegiate Athletic Conference (WVIAC).
- 2019
  - UVA Wise left the MEC to join the South Atlantic Conference (SAC) after the 2018–19 academic year.
  - Davis & Elkins College and Frostburg State University joined the MEC in the 2019–20 academic year.
  - The University of North Carolina at Pembroke (UNC Pembroke) joined the MEC as an associate member for men's and women's indoor track & field, women's swimming & diving and wrestling in the 2019–20 academic year.
- 2020
  - Alderson Broaddus University joined the MEC in the 2020–21 academic year.
  - UNC Pembroke added football to its MEC associate membership in the 2020 fall season (2020–21 academic year).
- 2021 – UNC Pembroke left the MEC as an associate member for men's and women's indoor track & field, women's swimming & diving and wrestling after the 2020–21 academic year.
- 2023 – Alderson Broaddus left the MEC before the 2023–24 academic year began, as the school had suspended all athletic programs. For the 2023-2024 academic year, the Mountain East Conference announced a non-conference scheduling agreement with NCAA Division II Independent and former WVIAC member Salem University to fill in the scheduling gaps left by the Alderson Broaddus' closure. The Tigers would compete against MEC schools in baseball, men’s and women’s basketball, men’s and women’s soccer, softball, and women’s volleyball.
- 2024
  - Point Park University joined the MEC in the 2024–25 academic year.
  - Notre Dame announced it would permanently close at the end of the 2023–24 academic year.
  - Dominican University of California joined the MEC as an associate member for women's lacrosse for the 2025 seasons (2024–25 academic year). Dominican will not play regular season games against MEC member schools, but will participate in the conference women's lacrosse tournament in order for the MEC to maintain the 6 member minimum required to maintain an automatic bid to the NCAA Division II women's lacrosse tournament.
  - Salem joined the MEC as an associate member for men's and women's swimming & diving and men's wrestling for the 2024–25 academic year. Additionally, the MEC also announced it would extend the non-conference scheduling agreement it made with Salem through the 2024–25 academic year.
- 2025
  - UNC Pembroke left the MEC as an associate member for football after the 2024 fall season (2024–25 academic year), thus ending its associate membership within the conference.
  - Kutztown University of Pennsylvania will join the MEC as an associate member for acrobatics & tumbling for the 2025 season (2025–26 academic year).
- 2026
  - Shawnee State University joined the MEC in the 2026–27 academic year.
  - Salem joined the MEC in the 2026-27 academic year as a men's soccer affiliate.
- 2027 – Salem will leave the MEC as an associate member for men's and women's swimming & diving, men's wrestling, and men's soccer at the end of the 2026–27 academic year to begin a transition to the National Association of Intercollegiate Athletics (NAIA).

== Member schools ==
=== Current members ===
The Mountain East currently has 12 full members, with five being private and seven being public schools. Reclassifying members listed in yellow.

Institution	Location	Founded	Affiliation	Enrollment	Endowment (millions – FY24)	Nickname	Joined (Note: Represents the calendar year when fall sports competition begins.)	Colors
University of Charleston	Charleston, West Virginia	1888	Nonsectarian	3,051	$46.7	Golden Eagles	2013	
Concord University	Athens, West Virginia	1872	Public	1,943	$35.3	Mountain Lions	2013	
Davis & Elkins College	Elkins, West Virginia	1904	Presbyterian	683	$45.0	Senators	2019	
Fairmont State University	Fairmont, West Virginia	1865	Public	3,325	$24.1	Falcons	2013	
Frostburg State University	Frostburg, Maryland	1898	Public	3,422	$42.8	Bobcats	2019	
Glenville State University	Glenville, West Virginia	1872	Public	1,772	$11.8	Pioneers	2013	
Point Park University	Pittsburgh, Pennsylvania	1960	Nonsectarian	3,448	$64.0	Pioneers	2024	
Shawnee State University	Portsmouth, Ohio	1986	Public	3,641	$24.8	Bears	2026	
West Liberty University	West Liberty, West Virginia	1837	Public	2,291	$16.4	Hilltoppers	2013	
West Virginia State University	Institute, West Virginia	1891	Public (HBCU)	3,247	$9.0	Yellow Jackets	2013	
West Virginia Wesleyan College	Buckhannon, West Virginia	1890	United Methodist	1,041	$65.1	Bobcats	2013	
Wheeling University	Wheeling, West Virginia	1954	Catholic	1,171	$9.2	Cardinals	2013	

=== Associate members ===
The Mountain East currently has three associate members, one public school and two private schools:

Institution	Location	Founded	Affiliation	Enrollment	Nickname	Joined (Note: Represents the calendar year when fall sports competition begins.)	Colors	MEC sport(s)	Primary conference
Dominican University of California	San Rafael, California	1890	Catholic	1,818	Penguins	2024		women's lacrosse	Pacific West (PacWest)
Kutztown University	Kutztown, Pennsylvania	1866	Public	7,468	Golden Bears	2025		acrobatics & tumbling	Pennsylvania (PSAC)
Salem University (Note: Salem also has a non-conference scheduling agreement with the MEC for baseball, men’s and women’s basketball, men’s and women’s soccer, softball, and women’s volleyball.)	Salem, West Virginia	1888	Nonsectarian (For-profit)	894	Tigers	2024		men's swimming & diving	D-II Independent
Salem University	Salem, West Virginia	1888	Nonsectarian (For-profit)	894	Tigers	2024		women's swimming & diving	D-II Independent
Salem University	Salem, West Virginia	1888	Nonsectarian (For-profit)	894	Tigers	2024		men's wrestling	D-II Independent
Salem University	Salem, West Virginia	1888	Nonsectarian (For-profit)	894	Tigers	2026		men's soccer	D-II Independent

=== Former members ===
The Mountain East had five former full members; three are private schools which left the MEC when the schools closed, while two are public schools that remain in operation.

Institution	Location	Founded	Affiliation	Enrollment	Nickname	Joined (Note: Represents the calendar year when fall sports competition begins.)	Left (Note: Represents the calendar year when spring sports competition ends.)	Colors	Current conference
Alderson Broaddus University	Philippi, West Virginia	1871	Baptist	750	Battlers	2020	2023		Closed in 2023
Notre Dame College	South Euclid, Ohio	1922	Catholic	1,522	Falcons	2013	2024		Closed in 2024
Shepherd University	Shepherdstown, West Virginia	1871	Public	4,400	Rams	2013	2019		Pennsylvania (PSAC)
Urbana University	Urbana, Ohio	1850	Nonsectarian	N/A	Blue Knights	2013	2020		Closed in 2020
University of Virginia's College at Wise (UVA Wise)	Wise, Virginia	1954	Public	2,000	Cavaliers	2013	2019		South Atlantic (SAC)

=== Former associate member ===
UNC Pembroke initially housed four sports in the MEC, later adding football to its MEC membership. One year after joining for football, it became a member of Conference Carolinas (CC), which sponsored all four of the non-football sports. UNCP remained an MEC football member until CC reinstated football in 2025.

Institution	Location	Founded	Affiliation	Enrollment	Nickname	Joined (Note: Represents the calendar year when fall sports competition begins.)	Left (Note: Represents the calendar year when spring sports competition ends.)	Colors	MEC sport(s)	Primary conference
University of North Carolina at Pembroke	Pembroke, North Carolina	1887	Public	5,827	Braves	2019	2021		men's indoor track & field	Carolinas (CC)
University of North Carolina at Pembroke	Pembroke, North Carolina	1887	Public	5,827	Braves	2019	2021		women's indoor track & field	Carolinas (CC)
University of North Carolina at Pembroke	Pembroke, North Carolina	1887	Public	5,827	Braves	2019	2021		women's swimming & diving	Carolinas (CC)
University of North Carolina at Pembroke	Pembroke, North Carolina	1887	Public	5,827	Braves	2019	2021		men's wrestling	Carolinas (CC)
University of North Carolina at Pembroke	Pembroke, North Carolina	1887	Public	5,827	Braves	2020	2025		football	Carolinas (CC)

=== Membership timeline ===
Full member (all sports) Full member (non-football) Associate member (football) Associate member (sport) Other Conference 1 Other Conference 2

== Sports ==
The MEC sponsored 16 sports in all, eight each for men and women, at its formation. Women's lacrosse became the 17th conference sport for the 2014–15 school year (2015 season). Men's and women's swimming and diving were added as the 18th and 19th conference sports for 2017–18, with the MEC and Great Midwest Athletic Conference (G-MAC) forming a swimming and diving alliance that conducts a joint conference championship meet. The following school year saw the MEC add acrobatics & tumbling as an official sport, two years before it was added to the NCAA Emerging Sports for Women program. The MEC was the first NCAA conference to establish acrobatics & tumbling as an official sport. The most recently added sports are men's and women's indoor track & field and wrestling, which debuted in 2019–20.

A divisional format is used for basketball (M/W), baseball, soccer (M/W), softball and volleyball (W).
North
- Davis & Elkins
- Fairmont State
- Frostburg State
- Point Park
- West Liberty
- Wheeling
South
- Charleston
- Concord
- Glenville State
- Shawnee State
- West Virginia State
- West Virginia Wesleyan

Teams in Mountain East Conference competition
Sport	Men's	Women's
Acrobatics & tumbling	–	8
Baseball	12	–
Basketball	12	12
Cross country	11	12
Football	9	–
Golf	11	10
Lacrosse	–	7
Soccer	10	11
Softball	–	12
Swimming & Diving	6	6
Tennis	8	8
Track & field (indoor)	9	9
Track & field (outdoor)	10	10
Volleyball	–	11
Wrestling	8	–

=== Men's sponsored sports by school ===
School	Baseball	Basketball	Cross Country	Football	Golf	Soccer	Swimming & Diving	Tennis	Track & Field Indoor	Track & Field Outdoor	Wrestling	Total MEC Sports
Charleston	Yes	Yes	Yes	Yes	Yes	Yes	No	Yes	Yes	Yes	No	9
Concord	Yes	Yes	Yes	Yes	Yes	Yes	No	No	Yes	Yes	No	8
Davis & Elkins	Yes	Yes	Yes	No	Yes	Yes	Yes	Yes	Yes	Yes	Yes	10
Fairmont State	Yes	Yes	Yes	Yes	Yes	No	Yes	Yes	No	No	Yes	8
Frostburg State	Yes	Yes	Yes	Yes	No	Yes	Yes	Yes	Yes	Yes	Yes	10
Glenville State	Yes	Yes	Yes	Yes	Yes	No	No	No	No	Yes	Yes	7
Point Park	Yes	Yes	Yes	No	Yes	Yes	No	No	Yes	Yes	Yes	8
Shawnee State	Yes	Yes	Yes	No (Note: Shawnee State will add football in 2028.)	Yes	Yes	Yes	Yes	Yes	Yes	No	9
West Liberty	Yes	Yes	Yes	Yes	Yes	Yes	No	Yes	Yes	Yes	Yes	10
West Virginia State	Yes	Yes	No	Yes	Yes	No	No	Yes	No	No	No	5
West Virginia Wesleyan	Yes	Yes	Yes	Yes	Yes	Yes	Yes	Yes	Yes	Yes	No	10
Wheeling	Yes	Yes	Yes	Yes	Yes	Yes	No	No	Yes	Yes	Yes	9
Associate Members
Salem						Yes	Yes				Yes	3
Totals	12	12	11	9	11	9+1	5+1	8	9	10	7+1	102+3

Men's varsity sports not sponsored by the Mountain East Conference which are played by MEC schools:

Future member in gray.

School	Bowling (Note: The NCAA sanctions only women's bowling. Men's college bowling is sanctioned by the United States Bowling Congress.)	Lacrosse	Volleyball (Note: Effective Division I sport; the NCAA's top-level championship is open to members of Divisions I and II.)
Charleston			EIVA
Davis & Elkins		G-MAC	
Frostburg State		ECC	
Shawnee State	TBA		
Point Park		G-MAC	
Wheeling		G-MAC	

=== Women's sponsored sports by school ===
School	Acrobatics & Tumbling (Note: De facto Division I sport. Graduated from the NCAA Emerging Sports for Women program to full championship status in January 2026, with the first NCAA championship, open to members of all divisions, to be held in 2026–27.)	Basketball	Cross Country	Golf	Lacrosse	Soccer	Softball	Swimming & Diving	Tennis	Track & Field Indoor	Track & Field Outdoor	Volleyball	Total MEC Sports
Charleston	No	Yes	Yes	Yes	Yes	Yes	Yes	No	Yes	Yes	Yes	Yes	10
Concord	No	Yes	Yes	Yes	No	Yes	Yes	No	No	Yes	Yes	Yes	8
Davis & Elkins	No	Yes	Yes	Yes	Yes	Yes	Yes	Yes	Yes	Yes	Yes	No	11
Fairmont State	Yes	Yes	Yes	Yes	No	Yes	Yes	Yes	Yes	No	No	Yes	9
Frostburg State	Yes	Yes	Yes	No	Yes	Yes	Yes	Yes	Yes	Yes	Yes	Yes	11
Glenville State	Yes	Yes	Yes	Yes	No	No	Yes	No	No	No	Yes	Yes	7
Point Park	No	Yes	Yes	Yes	Yes	Yes	Yes	No	No	Yes	Yes	Yes	9
Shawnee State	Yes	Yes	Yes	Yes	No	Yes	Yes	Yes	Yes	Yes	Yes	Yes	11
West Liberty	Yes	Yes	Yes	Yes	No	Yes	Yes	No	Yes	Yes	Yes	Yes	10
West Virginia State	Yes	Yes	Yes	No	No	Yes	Yes	No	Yes	No	No	Yes	7
West Virginia Wesleyan	No	Yes	Yes	Yes	Yes	Yes	Yes	Yes	Yes	Yes	Yes	Yes	12
Wheeling	Yes	Yes	Yes	Yes	Yes	Yes	Yes	No	No	Yes	Yes	Yes	9
Associate Members
Dominican (CA)					Yes								1
Kutztown	Yes												1
Salem								Yes					1
Totals	7+1	12	12	10	6+1	11	12	5+1	8	9	10	11	114+3

Women's varsity sports not sponsored by the Mountain East Conference which are played by MEC schools:

Future member in gray.

School	Bowling (Note: De facto Division I sport through 2026–27; the NCAA currently operates a single championship event open to all divisions. A separate Division II championship will be established in 2027–28.)	Field Hockey	Triathlon (Note: Included in the NCAA Emerging Sports for Women program.)	Wrestling (Note: De facto Division I sport; the NCAA currently operates a single championship event open to all divisions. The sport's status with respect to Division II will not be affected by the establishment of a separate Division III championship in 2027–28.)
Concord				(Note: Concord and Wheeling will add women's wrestling in 2026–27.)
Davis & Elkins			IND	
Frostburg State		PSAC		
Point Park				IND
Shawnee State	TBA			
Wheeling				

In addition to the above:

- Charleston considers its female cheerleaders (but not its male cheerleaders) to be varsity athletes.
- Glenville State considers its female cheerleaders (but not its male cheerleaders) to be varsity athletes. It also fields men's and women's teams in the non-NCAA sport of boxing.
- Point Park considers its cheerleaders, both male and female, and its all-female dance team to be varsity athletes. It also sponsors a varsity esports program, with men and women competing alongside and against one another.
- Wheeling fields a varsity team in the non-NCAA sport of men's rugby.

== National Championships ==
Since the founding of the conference in 2013, member institutions of the Mountain East Conference have won six NCAA national championships.

Year	Sport	School	Ref
2014	Men’s wrestling	Notre Dame (OH)	
2015	Volleyball	Wheeling	
2017	Men's soccer	Charleston	
2017	Men’s wrestling	Notre Dame (OH)	
2019	Men's soccer	Charleston	
2022	Women’s basketball	Glenville State	

== Conference facilities ==
School	Football		Basketball		Baseball		
School	Stadium	Capacity	Arena	Capacity	Stadium	Capacity	Ref
Charleston	UC Stadium at Laidley Field	18,500	Wehrle Arena	1,589	Welch Athletic Complex		
Concord	Callaghan Stadium	3,700	Carter Center		Anderson Field		
Davis & Elkins	non-football school		McDonnell Center	1,200	Harpertown Field		
Fairmont State	Duvall-Rosier Field	5,000	Joe Retton Arena	2,711	Dale Miller Field at Mylan Park		
Frostburg State	Bobcat Stadium	4,000	Bobcat Arena	3,600	Bob Wells Field		
Glenville State	I.L. & Sue Morris Stadium	5,500	Waco Center	3,000	Sue Morris Sports Complex		
Point Park	non-football school		CCAC-Allegheny Gym	1,000	Point Park Field		
Shawnee State	Spartan Stadium	8,500	Waller Gymnasium	1,040	Branch Rickey Park		
West Liberty	West Family Stadium	4,000	Academic, Sports, and Recreation Complex	1,200	Kovalick Field		
West Virginia State	Lakin-Ray Field at Dickerson Stadium	5,000	Walker Convocation Center	1,350	Cal Bailey Field	500	
West Virginia Wesleyan	Cebe Ross Field	3,000	Rockefeller Center	3,200	Hank Ellis Field		
Wheeling	Bishop Schmitt Field	1,300	McDonough Center	2,200	J.B. Chambers Baseball/Softball Complex		

Note: Shawnee State is set to join the conference in the 2026–27 academic year and is scheduled to begin sponsoring football in 2028. The football team will play their home games at Spartan Stadium

== Rivalries ==
The Mountain East Conference features several rivalries among its member institutions. Many of these rivalries stem from geographic proximity, longstanding athletic traditions, and previous conference affiliations. Rivalries are especially prominent in football and basketball, where schools regularly compete for conference championships and postseason berths.

Some of the football rivalries between MEC universities include:

Rivalry	Name	Trophy	Games played^{†}	Began	Record	Current Win Streak
Charleston–West Virginia St.	Kanawha Classic	Kanawha Classic Trophy	21	2005	UC 18–3	UC 3
Glenville St.–Fairmont St.	The Battle For The Bit	The Bit	98	1909	FSU 51–42–4	FSU 1
Wheeling–West Liberty	The Battle for Wheeling	None	7	2019	Wheeling 4–3	West Liberty 1
