= 2008 in basketball =

The following are the basketball events of the year 2008 throughout the world.

Tournaments include international (FIBA), professional (club) and amateur and collegiate levels.

== Tournaments ==
=== Men's tournaments ===
==== Olympics ====
- FIBA World Olympic Qualifying Tournament 2008 at Athens
  - Greece
  - Croatia
  - Germany
- 2008 Olympics at Beijing
  (gold) United States
  (silver) Spain
  (bronze) Argentina

==== Other tournaments ====
- EuroBasket 2009 qualification

=== Women's tournaments ===
==== Olympics ====
- FIBA World Olympic Qualifying Tournament for Women 2008 at Madrid
  - Spain
  - Czech Republic
  - Latvia
  - Belarus
  - Brazil
- 2008 Olympics at Beijing
  (gold) United States
  (silver) Australia
  (bronze) Russia

==== Other tournaments ====
- EuroBasket Women 2009 qualification

== Club championships ==
=== Continental seasons ===
==== Men ====
Organizer	League / Tournament	Champion	Runner-up	Result	Playoff format
Euroleague Basketball	2007–08 EuroLeague	(Russia) CSKA Moscow	(Israel) Maccabi Tel Aviv	91–77	Single-game final
Euroleague Basketball	2007–08 ULEB Cup	(Spain) DKV Joventut	(Spain) Akasvayu Girona	79–54	Single-game final
FIBA Americas	2007–08 FIBA Americas League	(Argentina) Peñarol	(Mexico) Soles de Mexicali	—	Single round-robin
FIBA Asia	2008 FIBA Asia Champions Cup	(Iran) Saba Battery Tehran	(Qatar) Al-Rayyan Sports Club	82–75	Single-game final

=== National championships ===
Men:

- (United States) (Canada) NBA
  - Season:
    - Western Conference: Los Angeles Lakers (57–25)
    - Eastern Conference and League: Boston Celtics (66–16)
    - Other Division champions: Detroit Pistons, New Orleans Hornets, Utah Jazz, Orlando Magic
  - Finals: The Boston Celtics defeat the Los Angeles Lakers 4–2 in the best-of-seven NBA Finals. Finals MVP: Paul Pierce
- (Argentina) Liga Nacional de Básquet, 2007–08 season:
  - Regular season: Libertad
  - Playoffs: Libertad defeat Quimsa 4–0 in the best-of-seven final.
- (Australia) National Basketball League, 2007–08 season: The Melbourne Tigers defeat the Sydney Kings 3–2 in the best-of-five grand finals.
- (China) Chinese Basketball Association, 2007–08 season: The Guangdong Southern Tigers defeat the Liaoning Hunters 4–1 in the best-of-seven finals.
- (Croatia) Croatian League:
- (Estonia) Estonian League, 2007–08: TÜ/Rock defeat Kalev/Cramo 4–0 in the best-of-7 final.
- (France) French League: Nancy crush defending champions Chorale Roanne 84–53 in the one-off final.
- (Germany) German Bundesliga:
- (Greece) Greek League: Panathinaikos defeat Olympiacos 3–2 in the best-of-five final.
- (Iran) Iranian Super League, 2007–08 season: Mahram defeat Saba Battery 2–0 in the best-of-three final.
- Israel Super League: Hapoel Holon defeat Maccabi Tel Aviv, the 14-time defending champions, 73–72 in the one-off final.
- (Italy) Italian Serie A: Montepaschi Siena defeat Lottomatica Roma 4–1 in the best-of-seven final.
- (Lithuania) Lithuanian LKL: Žalgiris defeat Lietuvos Rytas 4–1 in the best-of-seven final.
- Montenegro League:
- (Philippines) Philippine Basketball Association, 2007–08 season:
  - Philippine Cup: The Sta. Lucia Realtors defeat the Purefoods Tender Juicy Giants 4–3 in the best-of-seven finals. Finals MVP: Dennis Espino
  - Fiesta Conference: The Barangay Ginebra Kings defeat the Air21 Express 4–3 in the best-of-seven Finals. Finals MVPs: Ronald Tubid and Eric Menk
- (Poland) Polish League:
- (Russia) Russian Super League, 2007–08 season: CSKA Moscow sweep Dynamo Moscow 3–0 in the best-of-five final.
- Serbia Super League:
- (Slovenia) Slovenian League: Union Olimpija defeat Helios Domžale 3–1 in the best-of-five finals.
- (Spain) Spanish ACB:
  - Season: Real Madrid
  - Playoffs: TAU Cerámica sweep AXA FC Barcelona 3–0 in the best-of-five final.
- (Turkey) Turkish Basketball League:
- (United Kingdom) British Basketball League, 2007–08:
  - Season:
  - Playoffs:
- (Bosnia and Herzegovina) (Croatia) (Montenegro) (Serbia) (Slovenia) Adriatic League:

Women:

- (United States) 2008 WNBA Finals: Detroit Shock
- EuroLeague Women 2007–08: (Russia) Spartak Moscow Region

== College ==
=== Men ===
Nation	League / Tournament	Champion	Runner-up	Result	Playoff format
Canada	2008 CIS Men's Basketball Championship	Brock Badgers	Acadia Axemen	64–61	Single-game final
Philippines	2008 Philippine Collegiate Champions Cup	De La Salle Green Archers	Ateneo Blue Eagles	71–62	Single-game final
Philippines	UAAP Season 71	Ateneo Blue Eagles	De La Salle Green Archers	2–0	Best-of-three series
Philippines	NCAA Season 84	San Beda Red Lions	JRU Heavy Bombers	2–1	Best-of-three series

- (United States) NCAA
  - Division I: Kansas 75, Memphis 68 OT
    - Most Outstanding Player: Mario Chalmers, Kansas
  - National Invitation Tournament:
  - Division II: Winona State (MN) 87, Augusta State (GA) 76
  - Division III: Washington University in St. Louis (MO) 90, Amherst 68
- (United States) NAIA
  - NAIA Division I: Oklahoma City 75, Mountain State (WV) 72
  - NAIA Division II: Oregon Tech 63, Bellevue (NE) 56
- (United States) NJCAA
  - Division I: South Plains College 67, Salt Lake CC 56
  - Division II: Mott Community College 83, Columb State Community College 73
  - Division III: North Lake College TX 73, Joliet Junior College IL 70
- Philippines
  - Philippine Collegiate Championship 2008: De La Salle University 71, Ateneo de Manila University 62
  - UAAP Men's: Ateneo de Manila University def. De La Salle University, 2–0 in the finals series
  - NCAA (Philippines) Seniors': San Beda College def. José Rizal University, 2–1 in the finals series

=== Women ===
- (United States) NCAA
  - Division I: Tennessee 64, Stanford 48
    - Most Outstanding Player: Candace Parker, Tennessee
  - WNIT: Marquette 81, Michigan State 66
  - Division II: Northern Kentucky 63, South Dakota 58
  - Division III: Howard Payne (TX) 68, Messiah (PA) 54
- (United States) NAIA
  - NAIA Division I: Vanguard (CA) 72, Trevecca Nazarene (TN) 59
  - NAIA Division II: Northwestern College 82, College of the Ozarks MO 75
- (United States) NJCAA
  - Division I: Gulf Coast 62, Central Arizona 61
  - Division II: Kirkwood 78 vs Kankakee 53 (Final)
  - Division III: Monroe CC NY 79, Mohawk Valley CC 48
- UAAP Women's: Far Eastern University def. University of the Philippines, 2–0 in the finals series

=== Prep ===
- (United States) USA Today Boys Basketball Ranking #1: St. Anthony High School (New Jersey), Jersey City, New Jersey
- (United States) USA Today Girls Basketball Ranking #1: Sacred Heart Cathedral Preparatory, San Francisco, California
- NCAA (Philippines) Juniors: San Sebastian College-Recoletos def. Colegio de San Juan de Letran, 2–0 in the finals series
- (Philippines) UAAP Juniors: Ateneo High School def. De La Salle Zobel, 2–0 in the finals series

== Awards and honors ==
=== Basketball Hall of Fame ===
- Class of 2008:
  - Players: Adrian Dantley, Patrick Ewing, Hakeem Olajuwon
  - Coaches: Pat Riley, Cathy Rush
  - Contributors: William Davidson, Dick Vitale

=== Women's Basketball Hall of Fame ===
- Class of 2008
  - Debbie Ryan
  - Patty Broderick
  - Lin L. Laursen
  - Jill Rankin Schneider
  - Suzie McConnell-Serio
  - Michelle Timms

=== Professional ===
- Men
  - NBA Most Valuable Player Award: Kobe Bryant, Los Angeles Lakers
  - NBA Rookie of the Year Award: Kevin Durant, Seattle SuperSonics
  - NBA Defensive Player of the Year Award: Kevin Garnett, Boston Celtics
  - NBA Sixth Man of the Year Award: Manu Ginóbili, San Antonio Spurs
  - NBA Most Improved Player Award: Hedo Türkoğlu, Orlando Magic
  - NBA Coach of the Year Award: Byron Scott, New Orleans Hornets
  - FIBA Europe Player of the Year Award: Pau Gasol, Los Angeles Lakers and Spain (also Memphis Grizzlies)
  - Euroscar Award: Pau Gasol, Los Angeles Lakers and Spain (also Memphis Grizzlies)
  - Mr. Europa: Ricky Rubio, Joventut Badalona and Spain
- Women
  - WNBA Most Valuable Player Award: Candace Parker, Los Angeles Sparks
  - WNBA Defensive Player of the Year Award: Lisa Leslie, Los Angeles Sparks
  - WNBA Rookie of the Year Award: Candace Parker, Los Angeles Sparks
  - WNBA Sixth Woman of the Year Award: Candice Wiggins, Minnesota Lynx
  - WNBA Most Improved Player Award: Ebony Hoffman, Indiana Fever
  - Kim Perrot Sportsmanship Award: Vickie Johnson, San Antonio Silver Stars
  - WNBA Coach of the Year Award: Mike Thibault, Connecticut Sun
  - WNBA Finals Most Valuable Player Award: Katie Smith, Detroit Shock
  - FIBA Europe Player of the Year Award: Maria Stepanova, CSKA Samara and Russia

=== Collegiate ===
- Combined
  - Legends of Coaching Award: Pat Summitt, Tennessee
- Men
  - John R. Wooden Award: Tyler Hansbrough, North Carolina
  - Naismith College Coach of the Year: John Calipari, Memphis
  - Frances Pomeroy Naismith Award: Mike Green, Butler
  - Associated Press College Basketball Player of the Year: Tyler Hansbrough, North Carolina
  - NCAA basketball tournament Most Outstanding Player: Wayne Ellington, North Carolina
  - USBWA National Freshman of the Year: Michael Beasley, Kansas State
  - Associated Press College Basketball Coach of the Year: Keno Davis, Drake
  - Naismith Outstanding Contribution to Basketball: Dick Vitale
- Women
  - John R. Wooden Award: Candace Parker, Tennessee
  - Naismith College Player of the Year: Candace Parker, Tennessee
  - Naismith College Coach of the Year: Geno Auriemma, Connecticut
  - Wade Trophy: Candice Wiggins, Stanford
  - Frances Pomeroy Naismith Award: Jolene Anderson, Wisconsin
  - Associated Press Women's College Basketball Player of the Year: Candace Parker, Tennessee
  - NCAA basketball tournament Most Outstanding Player: Candace Parker, Tennessee
  - Basketball Academic All-America Team: Candace Parker, Tennessee
  - Carol Eckman Award: Doug Bruno, DePaul University
  - Maggie Dixon Award: Jeff Walz, Louisville
  - USBWA National Freshman of the Year: Maya Moore, Connecticut
  - Associated Press College Basketball Coach of the Year: Geno Auriemma, Connecticut
  - List of Senior CLASS Award women's basketball winners: Candice Wiggins, Stanford
  - Nancy Lieberman Award: Kristi Toliver, Maryland
  - Naismith Outstanding Contribution to Basketball: Jody Conradt

== Events ==
- The Seattle SuperSonics relocated to Oklahoma City, Oklahoma.

== Movies ==
- More than a Game
- Semi-Pro – a screwball comedy film starring Will Ferrell, loosely based on the American Basketball Association in the 1970s.

== Deaths ==
- March 22 — Red Stroud, American ABA player (New Orleans Buccaneers) (born 1941)
- March 25 — Ben Carnevale, American Hall of Fame coach of the Navy Midshipmen and North Carolina Tar Heels (born 1915)
- April 1 — Marvin Stone, former Kentucky Wildcats and Louisville Cardinals player (born 1981)
- April 4 — Julius McCoy, 76, All-American college player at Michigan State (1956).
- April 9 — Art Spoelstra, American NBA player (Rochester Royals, Minneapolis Lakers, New York Knicks) (born 1932)
- May 5 — Sam Aubrey, American college player and coach (Oklahoma State) (born 1922)
- May 23 — Bob Knight, American professional basketball player (New York Knicks) (born 1929)
- June 25 — A. L. Bennett, American college player (Oklahoma State) (born 1924)
- July 15 — Gennadi Volnov, Russian (Soviet) Olympic gold medalist (1972) (born 1939)
- August 20 — Larry Hennessy, American Villanova All-American (born 1929)
- August 20 — Kevin Duckworth, American NBA All-Star with the Portland Trail Blazers (born 1964)
- September 5 —Bob Cluggish, American BAA player (New York Knicks) (born 1917)
- September 5 — Doyle Parrack, American college coach (Oklahoma City, Oklahoma) (born 1921)
- September 6 — LeRoy Gardner Jr., University of Minnesota guard from 1966 to 1969. (born 1947)
- September 8 — Don Haskins, American Hall of Fame coach of the UTEP Miners, 1966 National Champions (born 1930)
- September 19 — Ernie Andres, All-American college player (Indiana), NBL player (Indianapolis Kautskys) (born 1918)
- November 17 — Pete Newell, American Hall of Fame coach of the California Golden Bears, 1959 National Champions (born 1915)
