= 2016 NCAA Division II women's basketball tournament =

US college basketball competition

- Teams: 64
- Finals site: Bankers Life Fieldhouse, Indianapolis, Indiana
- Champions: Lubbock Christian (1st title)
- Runner-up: Alaska Anchorage (1st title game)
- Semifinalists: Bentley (10th Final Four); Grand Valley State (2nd Final Four)
- Winning coach: Steve Gomez (1st title)
- MOP: Nicole Hampton (Lubbock Christian)

The 2016 NCAA Division II women's basketball tournament involved 64 teams playing in a single-elimination tournament to determine the NCAA Division II women's college basketball national champion. It began on March 10, 2016, and concluded with the championship game on April 4, 2016.

The first three rounds were hosted by top-seeded teams in regional play. The eight regional winners met for the quarterfinal and semifinals, better known as the "Elite Eight" and "Final Four" respectively, championship rounds for the second-consecutive year at the Sanford Pentagon in Sioux Falls, South Dakota. The championship game, along with the championship game of the Division I and Division III tournaments, were held at Bankers Life Fieldhouse in Indianapolis, Indiana.

In their first season of NCAA postseason eligibility after transitioning from the NAIA, the Lubbock Christian Lady Chaps completed an undefeated season by defeating the Alaska Anchorage Seawolves 78–73. The only blemish in the Lady Chaps' season was a 95–39 exhibition loss to eventual Division I champion Connecticut that did not count toward either team's official record.

== Participants ==
=== Automatic qualifiers ===
Twenty-four teams qualified for the tournament by winning their conference's automatic bid.

List of automatic qualifiers
Conference	Team	Appearance	Last bid
California Collegiate Athletic Association	Cal State East Bay	2nd	1989
Central Atlantic Collegiate Conference	Philadelphia	9th	2015
Central Intercollegiate Athletic Association	Virginia Union	6th	2004
Conference Carolinas	Virginia Union	5th	2015
East Coast Conference	Queens (NY)	3rd	2015
Great American Conference	Arkansas Tech	13th	2015
Great Lakes Intercollegiate Athletic Conference	Ashland	6th	2015
Great Lakes Valley Conference	Bellarmine	15th	2008
Great Midwest Athletic Conference	Ursuline	1st	—
Great Northwest Athletic Conference	Alaska–Anchorage	14th	2015
Gulf South Conference	Delta State	27th	2014
Heartland Conference	Lubbock Christian	1st	—
Lone Star Conference	Angelo State	9th	2008
Mid-America Intercollegiate Athletics Association	Emporia State	18th	2015
Mountain East Conference	Wheeling Jesuit	3rd	2006
Northeast-10 Conference	Bentley	32nd	2014
Northern Sun Intercollegiate Conference	Sioux Falls	1st	—
Pacific West Conference	Azusa Pacific	1st	—
Peach Belt Conference	Lander	10th	2015
Pennsylvania State Athletic Conference	California (PA)	13th	2015
Rocky Mountain Athletic Conference	Colorado State–Pueblo	8th	2015
South Atlantic Conference	Wingate	15th	2015
Southern Intercollegiate Athletic Conference	Benedict	6th	2015
Sunshine State Conference	Tampa	11th	2014

=== At-large ===
The remaining 40 bids to the tournament were given to teams at-large.

List of at-large bids
Team	Appearance	Last bid
Academy of Art	3rd	2014
American International	11th	2008
Anderson (SC)	10th	2015
Augusta	4th	2008
Black Hills State	1st	—
Bloomfield	2nd	2014
Cal State Dominguez Hills	8th	2015
Cal Baptist	2nd	2015
Chowan	1st	—
Clayton State	11th	2014
Colorado Mines	2nd	2010
Colorado Springs	2nd	2015
Columbus State	9th	2015
Drury	13th	2015
Florida Southern	11th	2012
Florida Tech	9th	2012
Fort Hays State	3rd	2015
Francis Marion	10th	2011
Grand Valley State	11th	2011
Holy Family	12th	2015
Indiana (PA)	10th	2015
Kentucky State	4th	2015
Lewis	11th	2015
Missouri Western	12th	2007
Montana State–Billings	13th	2014
New York Tech	2nd	2013
Northern State	8th	2015
Nova Southeastern	5th	2015
Pittsburg State	9th	2015
Quincy	10th	2014
Saginaw Valley State	3rd	1997
Saint Anselm	7th	1999
Shaw	12th	2014
Texas Woman's	2nd	2011
UC San Diego	9th	2013
Union (TN)	2nd	2015
West Chester	6th	2015
West Chester	14th	2015
West Texas A&M	22nd	2015
Winona State	3rd	2011

== Regionals ==
=== Atlantic - Richmond, Virginia ===
Hosted by Virginia Union University at Arthur Ashe Athletic Center

Regional Quarterfinals; Round of 64; March 11
1	Virginia Union	91
8	Indiana (PA)	72
4	Wheeling Jesuit	71
5	West Chester	69
2	California (PA)	80
7	Chowan	70
3	West Liberty	85
6	Shaw	70

Regional semifinals Round of 32; March 12
1	Virginia Union	75
4	Wheeling Jesuit	66
2	California (PA)	62
3	West Liberty	68

Regional finals Sweet Sixteen; March 14
1	Virginia Union	91
3	West Liberty	77

=== Central - Pittsburg, Kansas ===
Hosted by Pittsburg State University at John Lance Arena

Regional Quarterfinals; Round of 64; March 11
1	Emporia State	74
8	Northern State	68
4	Winona State	60
5	Fort Hays State	55
2	Pittsburg State	79
7	Sioux Falls	39
3	Missouri Western	80
6	Arkansas Tech	81

Regional semifinals Round of 32; March 12
1	Emporia State	66
4	Winona State	62
2	Pittsburg State	91
6	Arkansas Tech	80

Regional finals Sweet Sixteen; March 14
1	Emporia State	74
2	Pittsburg State	78

=== East - Waltham, Massachusetts ===
Hosted by Bentley University at Dana Center

Regional Quarterfinals; Round of 64; March 11
1	Bentley	62
8	Saint Anselm	54
4	Queens (NY)	76
5	Holy Family	64
2	American International	61
7	Bloomfield	59
3	Philadelphia	74
6	New York Tech	88

Regional semifinals Round of 32; March 12
1	Bentley	77
4	Queens (NY)	67
2	American International	69
6	New York Tech	73

Regional finals Sweet Sixteen; March 14
1	Bentley	79
6	New York Tech	74

=== Midwest - Ashland, Ohio ===
Hosted by Ashland University at Kates Gymnasium

Regional Quarterfinals; Round of 64; March 11
1	Ashland	72
8	Ursuline	70
4	Drury	79
5	Quincy	71
2	Lewis	70
7	Grand Valley State	72
3	Bellarmine	58
6	Saginaw Valley	69

Regional semifinals Round of 32; March 12
1	Ashland	60
4	Drury	86
7	Grand Valley State	63
6	Saginaw Valley	56

Regional finals Sweet Sixteen; March 14
4	Drury	60
7	Grand Valley State	62

=== South - Jackson, Tennessee ===
Hosted by Union University at Fred DeLay Gymnasium

Regional Quarterfinals; Round of 64; March 11
1	Union (TN)	62
8	Tampa	72
4	Florida Southern	61
5	Kentucky State	50
2	Benedict	51
7	Florida Tech	30
3	Delta State	64
6	Nova Southeastern	75

Regional semifinals Round of 32; March 12
8	Tampa	59
4	Florida Southern	69
2	Benedict	69
6	Nova Southeastern	57

Regional finals Sweet Sixteen; March 14
4	Florida Southern	64
2	Benedict	56

=== Southeast - Gaffney, South Carolina ===
Hosted by Limestone College at Timken Center

Regional Quarterfinals; Round of 64; March 11
1	Limestone	70
8	Augusta	79
4	Clayton State	56
5	Anderson (SC)	80
2	Lander	61
7	Francis Marion	62
3	Columbus State	79
6	Wingate	72

Regional semifinals Round of 32; March 12
8	Augusta	81
5	Anderson (SC)	73
7	Francis Marion	67
3	Columbus State	58

Regional finals Sweet Sixteen; March 14
8	Augusta	65
2	Francis Marion	72

=== South Central - Lubbock, Texas ===
Hosted by Lubbock Christian University at Rip Griffin Center

Regional Quarterfinals; Round of 64; March 10
1	Lubbock Christian	95
8	Texas Woman's	75
4	Angelo State	71
5	Colorado Mines	61
2	Colorado State–Pueblo	60
7	Black Hills State	78
3	West Texas A&M	70
6	Colorado Springs	43

Regional semifinals Round of 32; March 12
1	Lubbock Christian	101
4	Angelo State	72
7	Black Hills State	48
3	West Texas A&M	63

Regional finals Sweet Sixteen; March 14
1	Lubbock Christian	88
3	West Texas A&M	68

=== West - Azusa, California ===
Hosted by Azusa Pacific University at Felix Event Center

Regional Quarterfinals; Round of 64; March 11
1	Azusa Pacific	83
8	Montana State–Billings	75
4	UC San Diego	74
5	Cal State East Bay	59
2	Alaska–Anchorage	82
7	Cal State Dominguez Hills	53
3	Cal Baptist	93
6	Academy of Art	70

Regional semifinals Round of 32; March 12
1	Azusa Pacific	77
4	UC San Diego	87
2	Alaska–Anchorage	83
3	Cal Baptist	79

Regional finals Sweet Sixteen; March 14
4	UC San Diego	57
2	Alaska–Anchorage	72

== Elite Eight - Sioux Falls, South Dakota and Indianapolis, Indiana ==
Quarterfinals and semifinals location: Sanford Pentagon in Sioux Falls Host: Northern Sun Intercollegiate Conference

Championship game location: Bankers Life Fieldhouse in Indianapolis (along with the Division I and Division III championship games) Hosts: Horizon League and IUPU-Indianapolis

Quarterfinals; Elite Eight; March 22
SC1	Lubbock Christian	73
S4	Florida Southern	69
E1	Bentley	53
A1	Virginia Union	52
W2	Alaska–Anchorage	79
SE7	Francis Marion	55
MW7	Grand Valley State	59
C2	Pittsburg State	56

Semifinals; Final Four; March 23
SC1	Lubbock Christian	67
E1	Bentley	57
W2	Alaska–Anchorage	67
MW7	Grand Valley State	47

Finals; Championship Game; April 4
SC1	Lubbock Christian	78
W2	Alaska–Anchorage	73

== See also ==
- 2016 NCAA Division III women's basketball tournament
- 2016 NCAA Division I men's basketball tournament
- 2016 NCAA Division II men's basketball tournament
- 2016 NCAA Division III men's basketball tournament
- 2016 Women's National Invitation Tournament
- 2016 National Invitation Tournament
- 2016 NAIA Division I men's basketball tournament
- 2016 NAIA Division II men's basketball tournament
