= 2008 National Invitation Tournament =

U.S. college basketball tournament

- Season: 2007–08
- Teams: 32
- Finals site: Madison Square Garden, New York City
- Champions: Ohio State Buckeyes (2nd title)
- Runner-up: Massachusetts Minutemen (1st title game)
- Semifinalists: Florida Gators (3rd semifinal); Ole Miss Rebels (1st semifinal)
- Winning coach: Thad Matta (1st title)
- MVP: Kosta Koufos (Ohio State)

The 2008 National Invitation Tournament (known through sponsorship as the MasterCard NIT) was a single-elimination tournament of 32 National Collegiate Athletic Association (NCAA) Division I teams that did not participate in the 2008 NCAA Division I men's basketball tournament. The 71st annual tournament began on March 18 on campus sites and ended on April 3 at Madison Square Garden in New York City. Each regular season conference champion that did not receive a bid to the NCAA Tournament received an automatic bid to this tournament. The remaining slots were filled by the NIT Selection Committee. The first, second, and third rounds were played on the higher seeded team's home court, with the semi-finals and finals played at Madison Square Garden.

The Ohio State Buckeyes won the tournament.

== Selection Committee ==
The 2008 NIT Selection Committee consists of the following former college basketball coaches and administrators:

- Rudy Davalos
- Don DeVoe
- Gene Keady
- Reggie Minton
- C. M. Newton (chair)
- John J. Powers
- Carroll Williams

== Participants ==
=== Automatic qualifiers ===
The following teams were automatic qualifiers for the 2008 NIT field after losing in their respective conference tournaments; by virtue of winning their conferences' regular season championship and not qualifying for the NCAA tournament.

Team	Conference	Record	Appearance	Last bid
Alabama State	SWAC	20–10	2nd	1983
Morgan State	MEAC	22–10	1st	Never
Robert Morris	Northeast	26–7	1st	Never
Stephen F. Austin	Southland	26–5	2nd	1987
UC Santa Barbara	Big West	23–8	5th	2003
UNC Asheville	Big South	23–9	1st	Never
Utah State	WAC	24–10	9th	2007
VCU	CAA	24–7	5th	2005

=== Seedings ===
Seed	School	Conference	Record	Berth type
1	Ohio State	Big Ten	19–13	At-large
2	Illinois State	MVC	24–9	At-large
3	Dayton	A-10	21–10	At-large
4	California	Pac-10	16–15	At-large
5	New Mexico	MWC	24–8	At-large
6	Cleveland State	Horizon	21–12	At-large
7	Utah State	WAC	24–10	Automatic
8	UNC Asheville	Big South	23–9	Automatic

Seed	School	Conference	Record	Berth type
1	Arizona State	Pac-10	19–12	At-large
2	Florida	SEC	21–11	At-large
3	Creighton	MVC	21–10	At-large
4	Southern Illinois	MVC	17–14	At-large
5	Oklahoma State	Big 12	17–15	At-large
6	Rhode Island	A-10	21–11	At-large
7	San Diego State	MWC	20–12	At-large
8	Alabama State	SWAC	20–10	Automatic

Seed	School	Conference	Record	Berth type
1	Virginia Tech	ACC	19–13	At-large
2	Ole Miss	SEC	21–10	At-large
3	Nebraska	Big 12	19–12	At-large
4	VCU	CAA	24–7	Automatic
5	UAB	C-USA	22–10	At-large
6	Charlotte	A-10	20–13	At-large
7	UC Santa Barbara	Big West	23–8	Automatic
8	Morgan State	MEAC	22–10	Automatic

Seed	School	Conference	Record	Berth type
1	Syracuse	Big East	19–13	At-large
2	UMass	A-10	21–10	At-large
3	Florida State	ACC	19–14	At-large
4	Minnesota	Big Ten	20–13	At-large
5	Maryland	ACC	18–14	At-large
6	Akron	MAC	23–10	At-large
7	Stephen F. Austin	Southland	26–5	Automatic
8	Robert Morris	NEC	26–7	Automatic

== Bracket ==
First round
1	Ohio State	84
8	UNC Asheville	66
4	California	68
5	New Mexico	66
3	Dayton	66
6	Cleveland State	57
2	Illinois State	61
7	Utah State	57

Second round
1	Ohio State^	73
4	California	56
3	Dayton	55
2	Illinois State	48

Quarterfinals
1	Ohio State	74
3	Dayton	63

^ Game played at nearby St. John Arena due to a Bruce Springsteen concert at Value City Arena.

First round
1	Virginia Tech	94
8	Morgan State	62
4	VCU	77
5	UAB	80
3	Nebraska	67
6	Charlotte	48
2	Mississippi	83
7	UC Santa Barbara	68

Second round
1	Virginia Tech	75
5	UAB	49
3	Nebraska	75
2	Mississippi	85*

Quarterfinals
1	Virginia Tech	72
2	Mississippi	81

First round
1	Arizona State	64
8	Alabama State	53
4	Southern Illinois	69
5	Oklahoma State	53
3	Creighton	74
6	Rhode Island	73
2	Florida	73
7	San Diego State	49

Second round
1	Arizona State	65
4	Southern Illinois	51
3	Creighton	54
2	Florida	82

Quarterfinals
1	Arizona State	57
2	Florida	70

First round
1	Syracuse	87
8	Robert Morris	81
4	Minnesota	58
5	Maryland	68
3	Florida State	60
6	Akron	65*
2	Massachusetts	80
7	Stephen F. Austin	60

Second round
1	Syracuse	88
5	Maryland	72
6	Akron	63
2	Massachusetts	68

Quarterfinals
1	Syracuse	77
2	Massachusetts	81

=== Semifinals and Final ===
Played at Madison Square Garden in New York City on April 1 and 3

Semifinals
1	Ohio State	81
2	Mississippi	69
2	Florida	66
2	Massachusetts	78

Final
1	Ohio State	92
2	Massachusetts	85

* - Overtime game.

== See also ==
- 2008 Women's National Invitation Tournament
- 2008 NCAA Division I men's basketball tournament
- 2008 NCAA Division II men's basketball tournament
- 2008 NCAA Division III men's basketball tournament
- 2008 NCAA Division I women's basketball tournament
- 2008 NAIA Division I men's basketball tournament
- 2008 NAIA Division II men's basketball tournament
- 2008 College Basketball Invitational
