= Scott Rueck =

American basketball coach (born 1969)

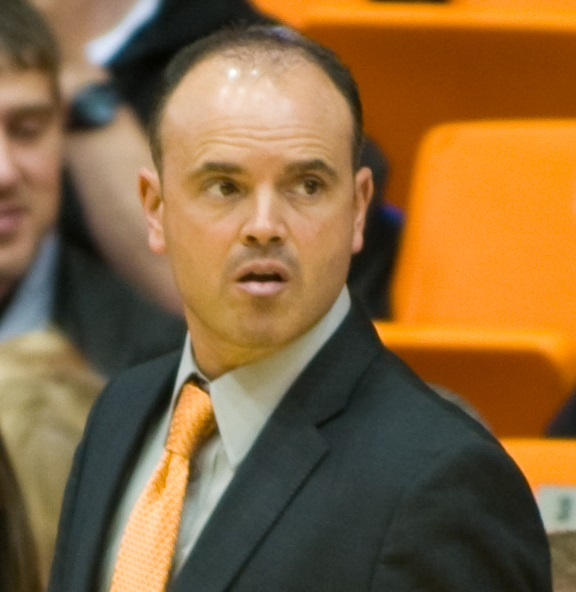
- Rueck in 2012

Current position
- Title: Head coach
- Team: Oregon State
- Conference: Pac-12
- Record: 339–182 (.651)

Biographical details
- Born: July 18, 1969 (age 57); Hillsboro, Oregon, U.S.
- Education: Oregon State ('91)

Coaching career (HC unless noted)
- 1989–1993: Santiam Christian HS (boys' asst.)
- 1993–1996: George Fox (asst.)
- 1996–2010: George Fox
- 2010–present: Oregon State

Head coaching record
- Overall: 617–270 (.696)

Accomplishments and honors

Championships
- NCAA Division III champion (2009); NCAA Regional – Final Four (2016); Pac-12 Tournament (2016); 3× Pac-12 regular season (2015–2017); WCC tournament (2025)

Scott Michael Rueck (born July 18, 1969) is the head coach of the Oregon State University women's basketball team.

== Early life ==
Rueck grew up in Hillsboro, Oregon, where he graduated from Glencoe High School. His father had been the first boys' basketball coach at Glencoe and had also been a coach at Hillsboro High School. After high school, he attended Oregon State University in Corvallis where he graduated with a bachelor's degree in exercise and sports science in 1991. While at OSU he started his coaching career at Santiam Christian High School in nearby Adair Village where he was an assistant with the boys' basketball team from 1989 until 1993. In 1992, he earned a master's degree from Oregon State in physical education.

== Coaching career ==
In 1993, Rueck took an assistant coach position at George Fox University in Newberg, Oregon, with the women's basketball team. Rueck then became the head coach of the women's team in 1996, and also coached the women's tennis team from 1995 to 1996. While at George Fox, Rueck had coached the Bruins to an 85–8 record from 2007 to 2010 and was named the Northwest Conference’s top coach for the fourth consecutive season. In 2009, Rueck guided the Bruins to a 32–0 record and the NCAA Division III national title. That year he was also named national coach of the year for Division III women's basketball. Overall, he had a 288–88 win–loss record in his 14 years as coach at George Fox.

Rueck was named coach of the Beavers in July 2010 to replace LaVonda Wagner.

Rueck has led the Beavers to eight NCAA tournament appearances, including seven straight tournaments from 2014 to 2021; the team has advanced to at least the second round in each appearance. On March 28, 2016, his team defeated Kim Mulkey's Baylor Bears 60–57 to secure the program's first ever trip to the NCAA Final Four. The Beavers lost 80–51 to the eventual champion UConn Huskies, finishing their season at 32–5. The 32 wins season were the most in women's basketball program history, and the Beavers finished their season ranked #2 in the nation.

== Personal life ==
Rueck is married to the former Kerry Aillaud. They have three children, Cole (22), Kate (19), and Macey (14).

== Head coaching record ==
Record table
Season	Team	Overall	Conference	Standing	Postseason
George Fox Bruins (Northwest Conference) (1996–2010)
1996–97	George Fox	15–10	11–5		
1997–98	George Fox	16–9	13–5		
1998–99	George Fox	18–6	14–4		
1999–00	George Fox	23–5	14–2	T–1st	NCAA Division III Sweet Sixteen
2000–01	George Fox	23–3	15–1	1st	NCAA Division III second round
2001–02	George Fox	20–6	11–5	T–3rd	
2002–03	George Fox	15–10	10–6	4th	
2003–04	George Fox	13–12	7–9	5th	
2004–05	George Fox	22–6	14–2	1st	NCAA Division III Elite Eight
2005–06	George Fox	19–6	10–6	T–3rd	
2006–07	George Fox	19–7	13–3	T–1st	NCAA Division III second round
2007–08	George Fox	25–5	14–2	T–1st	NCAA Division III Sweet Sixteen
2008–09	George Fox	32–0	16–0	1st	NCAA Division III champion
2009–10	George Fox	28–3	16–0	1st	NCAA Division III Elite Eight
George Fox:		288–88 (.766)	178–50 (.781)		
Oregon State Beavers (Pacific 10/12 Conference) (2010–2024)
2010–11	Oregon State	9–21	2–16	10th	
2011–12	Oregon State	20–13	9–9	T–5th	WNIT third round
2012–13	Oregon State	10–21	4–14	T–11th	
2013–14	Oregon State	24–11	13–5	T–2nd	NCAA Division I Second Round
2014–15	Oregon State	27–5	16–2	1st	NCAA Division I second round
2015–16	Oregon State	32–5	16–2	T–1st	NCAA Division I Final Four
2016–17	Oregon State	31–5	16–2	1st	NCAA Division I Sweet Sixteen
2017–18	Oregon State	26–8	14–4	T–3rd	NCAA Division I Elite Eight
2018–19	Oregon State	26–8	14–4	3rd	NCAA Division I Sweet Sixteen
2019–20	Oregon State	23–9	10–8	T–5th	Postseason not held due to COVID-19
2020–21	Oregon State	12–8	7–6	5th	NCAA Division I second round
2021–22	Oregon State	17–14	6–9	8th	
2022–23	Oregon State	13–18	4–14	T–10th	
2023–24	Oregon State	27–8	12–6	4th	NCAA Division I Elite Eight
Oregon State Beavers (West Coast Conference) (2024–2026)
2024–25	Oregon State	19–16	12–8	4th	NCAA Division I First Round
2025–26	Oregon State	23–12	13–5	T–3rd	WBIT First Round
Oregon State Beavers (Pac-12) (2026–present)
2026–27	Oregon State	0–0	0–0		
Oregon State:		339–182 (.651)	168–114 (.596)		
Total:		627–270 (.699)			
National champion Postseason invitational champion Conference regular season champion Conference regular season and conference tournament champion Division regular season champion Division regular season and conference tournament champion Conference tournament champion
