= 2010 in basketball =

The following are the basketball events of the year 2010 throughout the world.

Tournaments include international (FIBA), professional (club) and amateur and collegiate levels.

== National team tournaments ==
Venue	Tournament	(gold) Champion	(silver) Runner-up	(bronze) Third place	Result	Playoff format
Turkey	2010 FIBA Basketball World Cup	United States	Turkey	Lithuania	81–67	One-game playoff
Czech Republic	2010 FIBA Basketball Women's World Cup	United States	Czech Republic	Spain	89–69	One-game playoff
(France) Toulouse and Rodez	2010 FIBA Under-17 Women's World Championships	United States	France	China	92–62	One-game playoff
(Germany) Hamburg	2010 FIBA Under-17 World Championships	United States	Poland	Canada	111–80	One-game playoff

=== Men's Senior Division: All-Tournament Team ===
2010 FIBA Basketball World Cup
Nation	Player
United States	Kevin Durant (MVP)
Lithuania	Linas Kleiza
Argentina	Luis Scola
Serbia	Miloš Teodosić
Turkey	Hedo Türkoğlu

=== Women's Senior Division: All-Tournament Team ===
2010 FIBA Basketball Women's World Cup
Nation	Player
Czech Republic	Hana Horáková (MVP)
United States	Diana Taurasi
Czech Republic	Eva Vítečková
Spain	Sancho Lyttle
Belarus	Yelena Leuchanka

=== Youth Division: All-Tournament Team ===
2010 FIBA Basketball Under-17 World Cup
Nation	Player
Canada	Kevin Pangos
Poland	Mateusz Ponitka
United States	Bradley Beal (MVP)
United States	James Michael McAdoo
Poland	Przemyslaw Karnowski

== Professional club seasons ==
=== Continental championships ===
Men:

- Euroleague: (Spain) Regal FC Barcelona
- Eurocup: (Spain) Power Electronics Valencia
- EuroChallenge: (Germany) BG Göttingen
- Asia Champions Cup: (Iran) Mahram Tehran
- Liga Sudamericana: (Argentina) Quimsa

Women:

- EuroLeague Women: (Russia) Spartak Moscow Region

=== National championships ===
Men:

- (United States) (Canada) NBA
  - Season:
    - Division champions: Boston Celtics (Atlantic), Cleveland Cavaliers (Central), Orlando Magic (Southeast), Denver Nuggets (Northwest), Los Angeles Lakers (Pacific), Dallas Mavericks (Southwest)
    - Best regular-season record: Cleveland Cavaliers (61–21)
    - Eastern Conference: Boston Celtics
    - Western Conference: Los Angeles Lakers
  - Finals: The Lakers defeat the Celtics 4–3 in the best-of-seven series, with Kobe Bryant named Finals MVP.
- (Argentina) Liga Nacional de Básquet, 2009–10 season:
  - Regular season: Peñarol
  - Playoffs: Peñarol defeat Atenas 4–1 in the best-of-seven final.
- (Australia) National Basketball League, 2009–10 season:
  - Premiers: Perth Wildcats
  - Champions: Perth Wildcats defeat the Wollongong Hawks 2–1 in the best-of-three Grand Final.
- Basketball League Belgium:
- (Bulgaria) Bulgarian National League: Lukoil Academic defeat Levski Sofia 3–1 in the best-of-five final.
- (China) Chinese Basketball Association:
  - Regular season: Guangdong Southern Tigers
  - Playoffs: Guangdong Southern Tigers defeat Xinjiang Flying Tigers 4–1 in the best-of-seven final.
- (Croatia) Croatian League: Cibona defeat Zadar 3–2 in the best-of-five final.
- (Czech Republic) Czech League: Nymburk defeat Prostějov 4–1 in the best-of-seven final.
- (Netherlands) Dutch Eredivisie: GasTerra Flames Groningen defeat WCAA Giants Bergen op Zoom 4–1 in the best-of-seven final.
- (Estonia) Estonian League, 2009–10: TÜ/Rock defeat Rakvere Tarvas 4–2 in the best-of-7 final.
- (France) French Pro A League: Cholet defeat Le Mans 81–65 in the one-off final.
- (Germany) German Bundesliga, 2009–10 season: Brose Baskets defeat Deutsche Bank Skyliners 3–2 in the bist-of-five final.
- (Greece) Greek League, 2009–10 season: Panathinaikos defeat Olympiacos 3–1 in the best-of-five final.
- (Iran) Iranian Super League, 2009–10 season: Mahram defeat Zob Ahan 2–0 in the best-of-three final.
- (Israel) Israeli Super League, 2009–10 season: Gilboa/Galil defeat Maccabi Tel Aviv 90–77 in the one-off final.
- (Italy) Italian Serie A, 2009–10 season: Montepaschi Siena sweep AJ Milano 4–0 in the best-of-seven final.
- (Latvia) Latvian League: Barons defeat VEF Riga 4–3 in the best-of-seven final.
- (Lithuania) Lithuanian LKL: Lietuvos Rytas defeat Žalgiris 4–3 in the best-of-seven final.
- Montenegro League:
- (Philippines) Philippine Basketball Association, 2009–10 season:
  - Philippine Cup: Purefoods Tender Juicy Giants sweep the Alaska Aces 4–0 in the best-of-seven final.
  - Fiesta Conference: Alaska Aces defeat the San Miguel Beermen 4–2 in the best-of-seven final.
- (Poland) Polish League: Asseco Prokom Gdynia sweep Anwil Włocławek 4–0 in the best-of-seven final.
- (Russia) Russian Super League: CSKA Moscow sweep Khimki Moscow Region 3–0 in the best-of-five final.
- Serbia Super League:
- (Slovenia) Slovenian League: Krka defeat Union Olimpija 3–2 in the best-of-five final.
- (Spain) Spanish ACB:
  - Season: Regal FC Barcelona
  - Playoffs: Caja Laboral Baskonia sweep Regal FC Barcelona 3–0 in the best-of-five final.
- (Turkey) Turkish Basketball League: Fenerbahçe Ülker defeat Efes Pilsen 4–2 in the best-of-seven final.
- (Ukraine) Ukrainian SuperLeague: Azovmash Mariupol defeat Budivelnyk Kyiv 3–2 in the best-of-five final.
- (United Kingdom) British Basketball League, 2009–10:
  - Season: Newcastle Eagles
  - Playoffs: Everton Tigers defeat the Glasgow Rocks 80–72 in the one-off final.
- (Bosnia and Herzegovina) (Croatia) (Montenegro) (Serbia) (Slovenia) Adriatic League: Partizan Belgrade defeat Cibona 75–74 in overtime in the one-off final.
- (Estonia) (Latvia) (Lithuania) (Sweden) Baltic League: Žalgiris defeat Lietuvos Rytas 73–66 in the one-off final.
- (Estonia) (Latvia) (Lithuania) (Russia) (Ukraine) VTB United League, 2009–10 season: CSKA Moscow defeat UNICS Kazan 66–55 in the one-off final.
- (Taiwan) Super Basketball League:Yulon Dinos defeat Dacin Tigers 4–2 in the best-of-seven final.

Women:

- (United States) WNBA
  - Season:
    - Eastern Conference: Atlanta Dream
    - Western Conference: Seattle Storm
  - Finals: The Storm sweep the Dream 3–0, with their center Lauren Jackson becoming the first non-U.S. player to be named Finals MVP.

=== College ===
Men

- (United States) NCAA
  - Division I: Duke 61, Butler 59
    - Most Outstanding Player: Kyle Singler, Duke
  - National Invitation Tournament: Dayton 79, North Carolina 68
  - College Basketball Invitational: Virginia Commonwealth defeats Saint Louis 2–0 in the best-of-three final.
  - CollegeInsider.com Tournament: Missouri State 78, Pacific 65
  - Division II: Cal Poly Pomona 65, Indiana (PA) 53
  - Division III: Wisconsin–Stevens Point 78, Williams 73
- (United States) NAIA
  - NAIA Division I: Oklahoma Baptist 84, Azusa Pacific 83
  - NAIA Division II: Saint Francis (IN) 67, Walsh 66
- (United States) NJCAA
  - Division I: Howard (TX) 85, Three Rivers 80 (OT)
  - Division II: Lincoln (IL) 71, Cincinnati State 60
  - Division III: Joliet 94, Rochester (MN) 82
- (Philippines) UAAP Men's: Ateneo sweeps FEU in the best of three finals 2–0
- NCAA (Philippines) Seniors': San Beda sweeps San Sebastian in the best of five finals 3–0

Women

- (United States) NCAA
  - Division I: Connecticut 53, Stanford 47
    - Most Outstanding Player: Maya Moore, Connecticut
  - WNIT: California 73, Miami (FL) 61
  - Women's Basketball Invitational: Appalachian State 79, Memphis 71
  - Division II: Emporia State 65, Fort Lewis 53
  - Division III: Washington University in St. Louis 65, Hope 59
- (United States) NAIA
  - NAIA Division I: Union (TN) 73, Azusa Pacific 65
  - NAIA Division II: Northwestern (IA) 85, Shawnee State 66
- (United States) NJCAA
  - Division I:Gulf Coast Community College 83, Jefferson College 61
  - Division II:Kirkwood Community College 72, Patrick & Henry Community College 62
  - Division III:Madison College 74, Onondaga Community College 55
- (Philippines) UAAP Women's:

=== Prep ===
- (United States) USA Today Boys Basketball Ranking #1:
- (United States) USA Today Girls Basketball Ranking #1:
- NCAA (Philippines) Juniors:
- (Philippines) UAAP Juniors:

== Awards and honors ==
=== Basketball Hall of Fame ===
- Class of 2010:
  - Players: Cynthia Cooper, Dennis Johnson, Gus Johnson, Karl Malone, Maciel Pereira, Scottie Pippen
  - Coaches: Bob Hurley, Sr.
  - Contributors: Jerry Buss
  - Teams: 1960 USA Olympic Team, 1992 USA Olympic Men's Team (aka the "Dream Team")

=== Women's Basketball Hall of Fame ===
- Class of 2010
  - Leta Andrews
  - Teresa Edwards
  - Rebecca Lobo
  - Gloria Ray
  - Teresa Weatherspoon
  - Chris Weller

=== FIBA Hall of Fame ===
- Class of 2010

- Players

- Arvydas Sabonis
- Cheryl Miller
- Dino Meneghin
- Dragan Kićanović
- Natalya Zasulskaya
- Oscar Schmidt
- Vlade Divac

- Coaches

- Evgeny Gomelsky
- Lindsay Gaze
- Mirko Novosel

- Referees

- Jim Bain
- Konstantinos Dimou

- Contributors

- Abdoulaye Seye Moreau
- George Killian
- Hans-Joachim Otto

=== Professional ===
- Men
  - NBA Most Valuable Player Award: LeBron James, Cleveland Cavaliers
  - NBA Rookie of the Year Award: Tyreke Evans, Sacramento Kings
  - NBA Defensive Player of the Year Award: Dwight Howard, Orlando Magic
  - NBA Sixth Man of the Year Award: Jamal Crawford, Atlanta Hawks
  - NBA Most Improved Player Award: Aaron Brooks, Houston Rockets
  - NBA Sportsmanship Award: Grant Hill, Phoenix Suns
  - NBA Coach of the Year Award: Scott Brooks, Oklahoma City Thunder
  - J. Walter Kennedy Citizenship Award: Samuel Dalembert, Philadelphia 76ers
  - NBA Executive of the Year Award: John Hammond, Milwaukee Bucks
  - FIBA Europe Player of the Year Award: Announced in February 2011
  - Euroscar Award:
  - Mr. Europa:
- Women
  - WNBA Most Valuable Player Award: Lauren Jackson, Seattle Storm
  - WNBA Defensive Player of the Year Award: Tamika Catchings, Indiana Fever
  - WNBA Rookie of the Year Award: Tina Charles, Connecticut Sun
  - WNBA Sixth Woman of the Year Award: DeWanna Bonner, Phoenix Mercury
  - WNBA Most Improved Player Award: Leilani Mitchell, New York Liberty
  - Kim Perrot Sportsmanship Award: Tamika Catchings, Indiana Fever
  - WNBA Coach of the Year Award: Brian Agler, Seattle Storm
  - WNBA Finals Most Valuable Player Award: Lauren Jackson, Seattle Storm
  - FIBA Europe Player of the Year Award: Announced in February 2011

=== Collegiate ===
- Combined
  - Legends of Coaching Award: Billy Donovan, Florida
- Men
  - John R. Wooden Award: Evan Turner, Ohio State
  - Naismith College Coach of the Year: Jim Boeheim, Syracuse
  - Frances Pomeroy Naismith Award: Sherron Collins, Kansas
  - Associated Press College Basketball Player of the Year: Evan Turner, Ohio State
  - NCAA basketball tournament Most Outstanding Player: Kemba Walker, Connecticut
  - USBWA National Freshman of the Year: John Wall, Kentucky
  - Associated Press College Basketball Coach of the Year: Jim Boeheim, Syracuse
  - Naismith Outstanding Contribution to Basketball: John Thompson Jr
- Women
  - John R. Wooden Award: Tina Charles, Connecticut
  - Naismith College Player of the Year: Tina Charles, Connecticut
  - Naismith College Coach of the Year: Connie Yori, Nebraska
  - Wade Trophy: Maya Moore, Connecticut
  - Frances Pomeroy Naismith Award: Alexis Gray-Lawson, California
  - Associated Press Women's College Basketball Player of the Year: Tina Charles, Connecticut
  - NCAA basketball tournament Most Outstanding Player: Maya Moore, UConn
  - Basketball Academic All-America Team: Maya Moore, UConn
  - Kay Yow Award: Connie Yori, Nebraska
  - Carol Eckman Award: Kevin Cook, Gallaudet University
  - Maggie Dixon Award: Teresa Weatherspoon, Louisiana Tech
  - USBWA National Freshman of the Year: Brittney Griner, Baylor
  - Associated Press College Basketball Coach of the Year: Connie Yori, Nebraska
  - List of Senior CLASS Award women's basketball winners: Kelsey Griffin, Nebraska
  - Nancy Lieberman Award: Andrea Riley, Oklahoma State
  - Naismith Outstanding Contribution to Basketball: Marsha Sharp

== Events ==
- July 8 – LeBron James makes the decision to sign with the Miami Heat joining new signee Chris Bosh and Dwyane Wade. The decision was televised in an hour-long special on ESPN.
- December 21 – The University of Connecticut women's team wins its 89th consecutive game, surpassing the NCAA Division I record previously held by the UCLA men's team of 1971–1974.
- December 30 – UConn's record winning streak ends at 90 when the Huskies lose 71–59 to Stanford.

== Movies ==
- Just Wright – a romantic comedy film starring rappers Common and Queen Latifah that tells the story of a physical therapist who falls in love with a pro basketball player; film also features the NBA's Dwight Howard.
- Once Brothers – a TV documentary, jointly produced by ESPN Films and NBA Entertainment, focusing on Serb Vlade Divac and Croat Dražen Petrović, former Yugoslavia national teammates, and how the Yugoslav wars permanently broke their friendship.

== Deaths ==
- January 8 — Bob Blackburn, American radio and TV play-by-play announcer (Seattle SuperSonics) (born 1924)
- January 19 — Dan Fitzgerald, American college coach (Gonzaga) (born 1942)
- January 28 — Bud Millikan, American college coach (Maryland) (born 1920)
- February 3 — Dick McGuire, Hall of Fame player for the New York Knicks (born 1926)
- February 10 — Carl Braun, player and coach for the New York Knicks (born 1927)
- February 10 — Fred Schaus, American coach of West Virginia University and the Los Angeles Lakers (born 1925)
- February 13 — Red Rocha, American BAA and NBA player (born 1925)
- February 15 — Dana Kirk, former college coach at Memphis State University (born 1936)
- June 4 — John Wooden, Hall of Fame player (Purdue, Indianapolis Kautskys) and coach (UCLA) (born 1910)
- June 11 — Bus Whitehead, All-American college (Nebraska) and AAU (Phillips 66ers) player (born 1928)
- June 13 — Tom Stith, All-American at St. Bonaventure University (born 1939)
- June 19 — Manute Bol, Sudanese NBA player, tallest player in league history (born 1962)
- July 8 — Melvin Turpin, All-American at Kentucky and NBA veteran (born 1960)
- July 16 — Aleksandr Boloshev, Russian Olympic champion (born 1947)
- July 19 — Lorenzen Wright, American NBA player (born 1975)
- August 30 — Sharm Scheuerman, American college player and coach (Iowa) (born 1934)
- October 14 — Larry Siegfried, won five NBA titles with the Boston Celtics and an NCAA title at Ohio State (born 1939)
- October 25 — Roy Skinner, American college coach at Vanderbilt (born 1930)
- October 28 — Marshall Hawkins, American NBL and NBA player (born 1924)
- October 31 — Maurice Lucas, American ABA and NBA player. Won an NBA championship with the Portland Trail Blazers in 1977 (born 1952)
- November 8 — Quintin Dailey, All-American at San Francisco and NBA player (born 1961)
- November 13 — Red Curren, Canadian Olympic player (1952) (born 1925)
- December 6 — Art Quimby, NCAA rebounding leader; a Connecticut Huskie of Honor (born 1933)
- December 6 — Hank Raymonds, American college coach (Marquette) (born 1924)

== See also ==
- Timeline of women's basketball
