= 2008 NAIA Division II men's basketball tournament =

Collegiate basketball tournament in US

- Teams: 32
- Finals site: Keeter Gymnasium, Point Lookout, Missouri
- Champions: Oregon Tech Owls (2nd title, 3rd title game, 4th Fab Four)
- Runner-up: Bellevue Bruins (2nd title game, 2nd Fab Four)
- Semifinalists: MidAmerica Nazarene Pioneers (3rd Fab Four); Northwestern Red Raiders (6th Fab Four)
- Charles Stevenson Hustle Award: Jguwon Hogges (Oregon Tech)
- Chuck Taylor MVP: Ryan Fiegi (Oregon Tech)
- Top scorer: Danny Hawkins (MidAmerica Nazarene) (103 points)

The 2008 NAIA Division II Men’s Basketball national championship was held in March at Keeter Gymnasium in Point Lookout, Missouri. The 17th annual NAIA basketball tournament featured 32 teams playing in a single-elimination format.

== Awards and honors ==
- Leading scorer:
- Leading rebounder:

== Bracket ==
First round March 12–13	Second round March 14
1	Bellevue (NE) (29-3)	111
--	St. Joseph (VT) (13-15)	52
1	Bellevue (NE)	65
16	Aquinas (MI)	61
--	Dakota Wesleyan (SD) (24-9)	66
16	Aquinas (MI) (24-8)	91
1st SEED TIER; March 9
9	Bethel (IN) (27-6)	86
--	Warner Pacific (OR) (22-11)	73*
9	Bethel (IN)	86
--	Ottawa (KS)	81
--	Ottawa (KS) (23-8)	70
8	King (TN) (26-8)	65
5	Northwestern (IA) (27-4)	97
--	Minot State (ND) (19-12)	90
5	Northwestern (IA)	86
--	Oklahoma Wesleyan	85
--	Oklahoma Wesleyan (25-7)	75
12	William Penn (IA) (28-6)	73
4th SEED TIER; March 9
13	Northwood (FL) (25-7)	88
--	Bluefield (VA) (25-8)	86
13	Northwood (FL)	66
4	Walsh (OH)	59
--	Judson (IL) (19-9)	57
4	Walsh (OH) (25-4)	91
3	Morningside (IA) (28-3)	73
--	Indiana Tech (21-13)	67
3	Morningside (IA)	81*
--	Grace (IN)	90
--	Grace (IN) (24-9)	75
14	Embry-Riddle (FL) (27-7)	65
3rd SEED TIER; March 10
11	Oregon Tech (26-6)	77
--	Mt. Vernon Nazarene (OH) (23-8)	74
11	Oregon Tech	72
6	Evangel (MO)	63
--	Menlo (CA) (18-10)	48
6	Evangel (MO) (27-6)	73
7	Eastern Oregon (25-5)	93
--	Edward Waters (FL) (20-12)	62
7	Eastern Oregon	42
10	College of the Ozarks (MO)	65
--	Indiana-Southeast (24-9)	82
10	College of the Ozarks (MO) (25-5)	91
2nd SEED TIER; March 10
15	Cedarville (OH) (22-7)	83
--	Jamestown (ND) (23-9)	59
15	Cedarville (OH)	73
2	MidAmerica Nazarene	79
--	Friends (KS) (19-12)	66
2	MidAmerica Nazarene (28-4)	82

Quarterfinals; March 15
1	Bellevue (NE)	73
9	Bethel (IN)	69
5	Northwestern (IA)	96
13	Northwood (FL)	70
--	Grace (IN)	70
11	Oregon Tech	81
10	College of the Ozarks (MO)	58
2	MidAmerica Nazarene	70

Semifinals; March 17
1	Bellevue (NE)	70
5	Northwestern (IA)	67
11	Oregon Tech	74
2	MidAmerica Nazarene	71

National championship March 18
1	Bellevue (NE)	56
11	Oregon Tech	63

- * denotes overtime.

== See also ==
- 2008 NAIA Division I men's basketball tournament
- 2008 NCAA Division I men's basketball tournament
- 2008 NCAA Division II men's basketball tournament
- 2008 NCAA Division III men's basketball tournament
- 2008 NAIA Division II women's basketball tournament
