= 2010 NAIA Division I men's basketball tournament =

College basketball tournament

- Teams: 32
- Finals site: Municipal Auditorium, Kansas City, Missouri
- Champions: Oklahoma Baptist (2nd title, 7th title game, 8th Fab Four)
- Runner-up: Azusa Pacific (2nd title game, 5th Fab Four)
- Semifinalists: Robert Morris (IL) (2nd Final Four); Southern Poly (1st Final Four)
- Player of the year: Nate Brumfield (Oklahoma Baptist)

The 2010 Buffalo Funds - NAIA Division I men's basketball tournament was held in March at Municipal Auditorium in Kansas City, Missouri. The 73rd annual NAIA basketball tournament featured 32 teams playing in a single-elimination format. In 2010, both Buffalo Funds and the City of Kansas City extended contracts with the NAIA to remain title sponsors and keep the tournament in Kansas City at Municipal Auditorium until 2013. This was the second year that the Heart of America Conference was the tournament host.

Georgetown College made its 19th straight, and 29th overall tournament appearances, both tournament records. The championship game featured two ranked teams for the first time since 2008. The #3 Bison of Oklahoma Baptist University held of the #13 Cougars of Azusa Pacific University. Azusa Pacific's Marshall Johnson grabbed his teammate Dominique Johnson’s 2-point miss with nearly one second left, and heaved a 10-foot fade-away; nothing but net. Azusa Pacific thought they had won the game, after review, the horn had sound prior to Johnson's shot giving the Bisons their 2nd NAIA championship since 1966. 2010 was Azusa Pacific 2nd trip to the Championship game. In 2005 they also finished as the National Runner-Up.

== Awards and honors ==
- Leading scorer:
- Leading rebounder:
- Most tournament appearances: Georgetown (KY), 29th of 30, appearances to the NAIA Tournament
- Most consecutive tournament appearances: 19th, Georgetown (KY)

== Bracket ==
First round March 17 and 18	Second round March 19
1	Mountain State	105
–	Bacone	78
1	Mountain State	90*
–	Southern Poly	93
–	Southern Poly	78
16	Oklahoma City	70
TOP TIER; March 17
9	Campbellsville	61
–	Fresno Pacific	74
–	Fresno Pacific	82
–	John Brown	88
–	John Brown	73
8	McKendree	70*
5	LSU–Shreveport	70
–	Oklahoma Christian	80
–	Oklahoma Christian	52
12	Lee	82
–	Olivet Nazarene	58
12	Lee	79
TOP TIER; March 18
13	Azusa Pacific	72
–	Cumberlands	68
13	Azusa Pacific	65
4	Westminster (UT)	51
–	Evangel	74
4	Westminster (UT)	80
3	Oklahoma Baptist	96
–	St Xavier	72
3	Oklahoma Baptist	85
–	Texas Wesleyan	75*
–	Texas Wesleyan	74
14	Central Methodist	71
BOTTOM TIER; March 17
11	Georgetown (KY)	75
–	Park	83
–	Park	64
6	Biola	80
–	Belhaven	54
6	Biola	66
7	Southern Nazarene	86
–	Tougaloo	73
7	Southern Nazarene	81
-	Montana–Western	78
–	Montana–Western	80
10	Union (TN)	77
BOTTOM TIER; March 18
15	Robert Morris (IL)	90
–	Life	72
15	Robert Morris (IL)	67
2	Concordia (CA)	64
–	William Jewell	54
2	Concordia (CA)	71

Elite Eight; March 20
–	Southern Poly	71
–	John Brown	66
12	Lee	70
13	Azusa Pacific	75
3	Oklahoma Baptist	59
6	Biola	54
7	Southern Nazarene	101
15	Robert Morris (IL)	109

NAIA national semifinals March 22
–	Southern Poly	68
13	Azusa Pacific	80
3	Oklahoma Baptist	81
15	Robert Morris (IL)	79*

NAIA national championship March 23
13	Azusa Pacific	83
3	Oklahoma Baptist	84

- * denotes overtime.

== See also ==
- 2010 NAIA Division I women's basketball tournament
- 2010 NCAA Division I men's basketball tournament
- 2010 NCAA Division II men's basketball tournament
- 2010 NCAA Division III men's basketball tournament
- 2010 NAIA Division II men's basketball tournament
