= 2009 NCAA Division III women's basketball tournament =

- Teams: 63
- Finals site: DeVos Fieldhouse, Holland, Michigan
- Champions: George Fox Bruins (1st title)
- Runner-up: WashU Bears (7th title game)
- Third place: TCNJ Lions (1st Final Four)
- Fourth place: Amherst Lord Jeffs (1st Final Four)
- Winning coach: Scott Rueck (1st title)
- MOP: Kristen Shielee (George Fox)
- Attendance: 27,616

The 2009 NCAA Division III women's basketball tournament was the 28th annual tournament hosted by the NCAA to determine the national champion of Division III women's collegiate basketball in the United States.

George Fox defeated Washington St. Louis in the championship game, 60–53, to claim the Bruins' first Division III national title.

The championship rounds were hosted by Hope College at the DeVos Fieldhouse in Holland, Michigan from March 20–21.

== Qualifying ==
For the fourth consecutive year, the tournament featured sixty-three teams. All teams but one, George Fox, started play in the First Round, with the Bruins receiving the singular bye to the Second Round.

== Bracket ==
=== Top left sectional ===
First round March 4–6, 2009; Regional sites
Orange, CA/Newberg, OR
Chapman	70
Occidental	65
Oglethorpe	68
Maryville (TN)	65
Atlanta, GA
Greensboro	77
Mississippi College	70
Messiah	81
Eastern Conn. State	46
Grantham, PA
Thomas More	76
Randolph-Macon	61
Hope	87
Washington & Jefferson	64
Holland, MI
Baldwin-Wallace	52
Pitt Greensburg	44

Second round March 7, 2009; Regional sites
George Fox	83
Chapman	40
Oglethorpe	67
Greensboro	40
Messiah	50
Thomas More	57
Hope	69
Baldwin-Wallace	53

Sectional semifinals March 13, 2009; Crestview Hills, KY
George Fox	71
Oglethorpe	56
Thomas More	51
Hope	67

Sectional finals March 14, 2009; Crestview Hills, KY
George Fox	58
Hope	46

=== Bottom left sectional ===
First round March 4–6, 2009; Regional sites
Scranton	73
Keuka	42
Scranton, PA
St. Lawrence	55
Cortland State	71
York (PA)	75
Christopher Newport	61
York, PA
Cabrini	58
Baruch	72
Moravian	70
Tufts	80
Bethlehem, PA
TCNJ	64
DeSales	51
Rochester	67
Widener	56
Rochester, NY
Kean	74
Marymount	60

Second round March 7, 2009; Regional sites
Scranton	51
Cortland State	45
York (PA)	90
Baruch	73
Tufts	55
TCNJ	57
Rochester	66
Kean	59

Sectional semifinals March 13, 2009; Rochester, NY
Scranton	50
York (PA)	46
TCNJ	70
Rochester	58

Sectional finals March 14, 2009; Rochester, NY
Scranton	48
TCNJ	54

=== Top right sectional ===
First round March 4–6, 2009; Regional sites
Illinois Wesleyan	80
Ohio Wesleyan	51
Bloomington, IL
UW Eau Claire	62
DePauw Tigers	50
UW Stevens Point	77
Maryville (MO)	62
Stevens Point, WI
Concordia Moorhead	72
Concordia Wisconsin	76
Saint Benedict	55
Ripon	42
St. Joseph, MN
UW Whitewater	69
Simpson	59
Washington St. Louis	77
Capital	72
St. Louis, MO
Transylvania	65
Howard Payne	52

Second round March 7, 2009; Regional sites
Illinois Wesleyan	80
UW Eau Claire	63
UW Stevens Point	78
Concordia Wisconsin	58
Saint Benedict	67
UW Whitewater	59
Washington St. Louis	77
Transylvania	72

Sectional semifinals March 13, 2009; Bloomington, IL
Illinois Wesleyan	77
UW Stevens Point	64
Saint Benedict	43
Washington St. Louis	56

Sectional finals March 14, 2009; Bloomington, IL
Illinois Wesleyan	53
Washington St. Louis	58

=== Bottom right sectional ===
First round March 4–6, 2009; Regional sites
Amherst	77
Babson	54
Amherst, MA
Southern Maine	49
Emmanuel (MA)	55
NYU	80
Salve Regina	55
New York, NY
Mary Washington	50
Stevens Tech	59
Brandeis	62
Western Conn. State	49
Waltham, MA
Mount Saint Mary	56
Brockport State	46
Bowdoin	72
Castleton	31
Brunswick, ME
Muhlenberg	80
Westfield State	63

Second round March 7, 2009; Regional sites
Amherst	76
Emmanuel (MA)	37
NYU	71
Stevens Tech	57
Brandeis	79
Mount Saint Mary	52
Bowdoin	57
Muhlenberg	58

Sectional semifinals March 13, 2009; Amherst, MA
Amherst	74
NYU	51
Brandeis	82
Muhlenberg	70

Sectional finals March 14, 2009; Amherst, MA
Amherst	68
Brandeis	54

=== Final Four ===
Final Four; March 20, 2009; DeVos Fieldhouse; Holland, MI
George Fox	67
TCNJ	52
Washington St. Louis	65
Amherst	49

National championship March 21, 2009; DeVos Fieldhouse; Holland, MI
George Fox	60
Washington St. Louis	53
Third place
TCNJ	82
Amherst	74

== All-tournament team ==
- Kristen Shielee, George Fox
- Sage Indendi, George Fox
- Janice Evans, Washington University in St. Louis
- Jaimie McFarlin, Washington University in St. Louis
- Hillary Klimowicz, TCNJ

== See also ==
- 2009 NCAA Division I women's basketball tournament
- 2009 NCAA Division II women's basketball tournament
- 2009 NAIA Division I women's basketball tournament
- 2009 NAIA Division II women's basketball tournament
- 2009 NCAA Division III men's basketball tournament
