= 2010 NCAA Division III men's basketball tournament =

American collegiate men's basketball tournament (2010)

- Finals site: , Salem, Virginia
- Champions: Wisconsin–Stevens Point (3rd title)
- Runner-up: Williams (3rd title game)
- Semifinalists: Guilford (2nd Final Four); Randolph-Macon (1st Final Four)
- Winning coach: Bob Semling (UWSP)
- MOP: Matt Moses (UWSP)
- Attendance: 44,638

The 2010 NCAA Division III men's basketball tournament was a single-elimination tournament to determine the men's collegiate basketball national champion of National Collegiate Athletic Association (NCAA) Division III.

The tournament began on March 4, 2010 and concluded with the national championship game on March 20, 2010 at the Salem Civic Center in Salem, Virginia.

The tournament was won by the University of Wisconsin-Stevens Point, which defeated Williams College, 78–73, in the title game. The championship was the third in the Pointers' history and first since 2005.

== Qualifying teams ==
School	Conference	Record
Bridgewater State	MASCAC	19–7
University of Maine at Farmington	North Atlantic Conference	14–11
Plattsburgh State	SUNYAC	21–7
SUNYIT	North Eastern Athletic Conference	24–4
Medaille	Allegheny Mountain Collegiate Conference	23–4
Nazareth	Empire 8	18–9
Middlebury	NESCAC	24–3
Gordon	Commonwealth Coast Conference	24–4
Rhode Island College	Little East Conference	20–7
Rutgers–Newark	New Jersey Athletic Conference	20–7
St. John Fisher	Empire 8	22–5
Brooklyn	City University of New York Athletic Conference	22–6
Brandeis	University Athletic Association	19–6
St. Lawrence	Liberty League	16–11
Guilford	Old Dominion Athletic Conference	26–2
Christopher Newport	USA South Athletic Conference	15–12
John Carroll	Ohio Athletic Conference	20–6
Maryville (Tennessee)	Great South Athletic Conference	23–4
Wooster	North Coast Athletic Conference	23–5
Grove City	Presidents' Athletic Conference	19–8
Wis.-Whitewater	Wisconsin Intercollegiate Athletic Conference	22–5
Defiance	Heartland Collegiate Athletic Conference	23–5
Eastern Mennonite	Old Dominion Athletic Conference	22–4
Centre	Southern Collegiate Athletic Conference	18–8
Wilmington (Ohio)	Ohio Athletic Conference	21–7
Lycoming	MAC Commonwealth Conference	21–6
Chapman	Independent	23–2
Claremont-Mudd-Scripps	Southern California Intercollegiate Athletic Conference	24–6
Williams	New England Small College Athletic Conference	26–1
Texas-Dallas	American Southwest Conference	23–5
Mary Hardin-Baylor	American Southwest Conference	22–6
Wheaton (Illinois)	College Conference of Illinois and Wisconsin	18–8
Wis.-Stevens Point	Wisconsin Intercollegiate Athletic Conference	23–4
Carleton	Minnesota Intercollegiate Athletic Conference	19–9
Hope	Michigan Intercollegiate Athletic Association	21–7
St. Norbert	Midwest Conference	22–3
Washington-St. Louis	University Athletic Association	23–2
Westminster (Missouri)	St. Louis Intercollegiate Athletic Conference	20–7
Illinois Wesleyan	College Conference of Illinois and Wisconsin	20–7
Central (Iowa)	Iowa Intercollegiate Athletic Conference	23–4
Aurora	Northern Athletics Conference	18–10
St. Thomas (Minnesota)	Minnesota Intercollegiate Athletic Conference	23–3
Anderson (Indiana)	Heartland Collegiate Athletic Conference	22–5
St. Marys (Maryland)	Capital Athletic Conference	24–3
Purchase	Skyline Conference	20–8
Richard Stockton	Eastern College Athletic Conference	20–7
Virginia Wesleyan	Old Dominion Athletic Conference	22–5
U.S. Merchant Marine Academy	Landmark Conference	23–4
Wesley	Eastern College Athletic Conference	19–8
Oneonta State	SUNYAC	22–6
Franklin and Marshall	Centennial Conference	23–4
Albright	Eastern College Athletic Conference	21–5
Clark (Massachusetts)	NEWMAC	16–12
Cabrini	Colonial States Athletic Conference	25–2
Randolph-Macon	Old Dominion Athletic Conference	16–12
William Paterson	Eastern College Athletic Conference	25–2
Albertus Magnus	Great Northeast Athletic Conference	22–6
DeSales	Eastern College Athletic Conference	22–5
MIT	NEWMAC	22–4
Whitworth	Northwest Conference	25–2
Carthage	College Conference of Illinois and Wisconsin	22–5

== Brackets ==
Results to date

* – Denotes overtime period

=== Williamstown, MA Regional ===
First round March 4–5
Bridgewater State	63
Maine-Farmington	64
Plattsburgh State	65
SUNYIT	71
Medaille	78
Nazareth	72
Middlebury	64
Gordon	57
Rhode Island College	72
Rutgers–Newark	60
St. John Fisher	60
Brooklyn	56
Brandeis	76
St. Lawrence	54

Second round March 6
Williams	83
Maine-Farmington	64
SUNYIT	64
Medaille	63
Middlebury	59
Rhode Island College	75
St. John Fisher	52
Brandeis	66

Regional semifinals March 12
Williams	104
SUNYIT	70
Rhode Island College	65
Brandeis	76

Regional finals March 13
Williams	71
Brandeis	57

=== Greensboro, NC Regional ===
First round March 4–5
Guilford	83
Chris. Newport	59
John Carroll	88
Maryville (TN)	67
Wooster	63
Grove City	52
Wis. Whitewater	75
Defiance	71
Eastern Mennonite	63
Centre	53
Wilmington (OH)	78
Lycoming	74
Chapman	58
Claremont-M-S	47

Second round March 6
Guilford	85
John Carroll	82
Wooster	87
Wis.-Whitewater	78
Eastern Mennonite	85
Wilmington (OH)	71
Chapman	56
Whitworth	77

Regional semifinals March 12
Guilford	75
Wooster	68
Eastern Mennonite	74
Whitworth	71

Regional finals March 13
Guilford	90
Eastern Mennonite	80

=== Stevens Point, WI Regional ===
First round March 4–5
Mary Hardin-Baylor	58
Wheaton (IL)	73
Wis. Stevens-Point	59
Carleton	58
Hope	65
St. Norbert	72
Wash.-St. Louis	79
Westminster	71
Illinois Wesleyan	86
Central (IA)	81
Carthage	84
Aurora	70
St. Thomas (MN)	71
Anderson (IN)	73

Second round March 6
Texas-Dallas	63
Wheaton (IL)	62
Wis.-Stevens Point	63
St. Norbert	48
Wash.-St. Louis	70
Ill. Wesleyan	75
Carthage	76
Anderson (IN)	58

Regional semifinals March 12
Texas-Dallas	67
Wis.-Stevens Point	74
Ill. Wesleyan	77
Carthage	72

Regional finals March 13
Wis. Stevens-Point	72
Ill. Wesleyan	58

=== St. Mary's City, MD Regional ===
First round March 4–5
St. Mary's (MD)	88
Purchase	58
Richard Stockton	82
Va. Wesleyan	85
Merchant Marine	67
Wesley	61
Oneonta St.	77
Frank. & Marsh.	91
Albright	67
Clark (MA)	69
Cabrini	66
Randolph-Macon	95
Wm. Paterson	55
Albertus Magnus	57
DeSales	72
MIT	64

Second round March 6
St. Mary's (MD)	72
Va. Wesleyan	69
Merchant Marine	64
Frank. & Marsh.	73
Clark (MA)	60
Randolph-Macon	70
Albertus Magnus	48
DeSales	82

Regional semifinals March 12
St. Mary's (MD)	87
Frank. & Marsh.	92
Randolph-Macon	68
DeSales	55

Regional finals March 13
Frank. & Marsh.	65
Randolph-Macon	73

=== Final Four – Salem, VA ===
National Semifinals; March 19
Williams	97
Guilford	88
Wis.-Stevens Point	72
Randolph-Macon	60

National Championship Game; March 20
Williams	73
Wis.-Stevens Point	78

== See also ==
- 2010 NCAA Division III women's basketball tournament
- 2010 NCAA Division I men's basketball tournament
- 2010 NCAA Division II men's basketball tournament
- 2010 NAIA Division I men's basketball tournament
- 2010 NAIA Division II men's basketball tournament
