= 2010 NCAA Division II women's basketball tournament =

- Teams: 64
- Finals site: St. Joseph Civic Arena, (Missouri) St. Joseph, MO
- Champions: Emporia State Lady Hornets (1st title)
- Runner-up: Fort Lewis Skyhawks (1st title game)
- Semifinalists: Franklin Pierce Ravens (2nd Final Four); Gannon Golden Knights (1st Final Four)
- Winning coach: Brandon Schneider (1st title)
- MOP: Alli Volkens (Emporia State)

The 2010 NCAA Division II women's basketball tournament was the 29th annual tournament hosted by the NCAA to determine the national champion of Division II women's collegiate basketball in the United States.

Emporia State defeated Fort Lewis in the championship game, 65–53, to claim the Lady Hornets' first NCAA Division II national title.

The championship rounds were contested at the St. Joseph Civic Arena in St. Joseph, Missouri.

== Regionals ==
=== Atlantic - California and Erie, Pennsylvania ===
^ California, Pennsylvania Location: Hamer Hall Host: California University of Pennsylvania

~ Erie, Pennsylvania Location: Hammermill Center Host: Gannon University

First round Round of 64; March 12
1	Gannon ~	92
8	Fairmont State	65
5	Seton Hill ~	73
4	Fayetteville State	64
2	California (PA) ^	72
7	Virginia State	60
6	Millersville ^	66
3	West Liberty	50

Regional semifinals Round of 32; March 13
1	Gannon ~	80
5	Seton Hill	60
2	California (PA)	63
6	Millersville ^	74

Regional finals Sweet 16; March 15
1	Gannon ~	65
6	Millersville	48

=== Southeast - Greenwood, South Carolina ===
Location: Horne Arena Host: Lander University

First round Round of 64; March 12
3	Francis Marion	103
6	Newberry	96
7	Tusculum	69
2	Clayton State	63
5	Carson-Newman	79
4	Lenoir-Rhyne	72
1	Lander	96
8	Anderson (SC)	55

Regional semifinals Round of 32; March 13
3	Francis Marion	96
7	Tusculum	103
5	Carson-Newman	67
1	Lander	94

Regional finals Sweet 16; March 15
7	Tusculum	70
1	Lander	63

=== South Central - Canyon, Texas ===
Location: First United Bank Center Host: West Texas A&M University

First round Round of 64; March 12
3	Northeastern State	54
6	Central Oklahoma	52
7	Washburn	72
2	Central Missouri	61
4	Emporia State	90
5	Tarleton State	71
1	West Texas A&M	78
8	St. Mary's (TX)	50

Regional semifinals /Round of 32; March 13
3	Northeastern State	56
7	Washburn	51
4	Emporia State	76
1	West Texas A&M	69

Regional finals Sweet 16; March 15
3	Northeastern State	45
4	Emporia State	76

=== Midwest - Houghton, Michigan ===
Location: SDC Gymnasium Host: Michigan Technological University

First round Round of 64; March 12
3	Drury	71
6	Southern Indiana	48
7	Northern Michigan	52
2	Indianapolis	51
1	Michigan Tech	69
8	Northern Kentucky	49
4	Findlay	54
5	Wisconsin-Parkside	51

Regional semifinals Round of 32; March 14
3	Drury	59
7	Northern Michigan	51
1	Michigan Tech	68
4	Findlay	57

Regional finals Sweet 16; March 16
3	Drury	68
1	Michigan Tech	84

=== East - Fitchburg, Massachusetts ===
Location: Fitchburg State Recreation Center Host: Franklin Pierce College

First round Round of 64; March 12
2	Holy Family	49
7	Bridgeport	43
3	Stonehill	74
6	Bentley	56
1	Franklin Pierce	71
8	Nyack	46
5	Molloy	52
4	Pace	36

Regional semifinals Round of 32; March 13
2	Holy Family	64
3	Stonehill	47
1	Franklin Pierce	76
5	Molloy	58

Regional finals Sweet 16; March 15
2	Holy Family	79
1	Franklin Pierce	82 (OT)

=== South - Russellville, Arkansas ===
Location: Tucker Coliseum Host: Arkansas Tech University

First round Round of 64; March 12
2	Delta State	69
7	Lynn	55
6	Valdosta State	50
3	Fort Valley State	49
1	Arkansas Tech	65
8	Benedict	48
4	Tampa	55
5	Barry	51

Regional semifinals Round of 32; March 14
2	Delta State	67
6	Valdosta State	56
1	Arkansas Tech	69
4	Tampa	68

Regional finals Sweet 16; March 16
2	Delta State	62
1	Arkansas Tech	73

=== Central - Durango, Colorado ===
Location: Whalen Gymnasium Host: Fort Lewis College

First round Round of 64; March 12
7	Colorado State-Pueblo	59
2	Wayne State (NE)	48
3	Concordia-St. Paul	87
6	Adams State	59
4	Augustana (SD)	74
5	Minnesota-Duluth	57
1	Fort Lewis	63
8	Colorado School of Mines	54

Regional semifinals Round of 32; March 13
7	Colorado State-Pueblo	56
3	Concordia-St. Paul	83
4	Augustana (SD)	52
1	Fort Lewis	79

Regional finals Sweet 16; March 15
3	Concordia-St. Paul	64
1	Fort Lewis	73

=== West - Seattle, Washington ===
Location: Royal Brougham Pavilion Host: Seattle Pacific University

First round Round of 64; March 12
6	Cal State Chico	79
3	Western Washington	68
7	Humboldt State	76
2	UC-San Diego	72
4	Alaska Anchorage	69
5	Cal Poly Pomona	50
1	Seattle Pacific	65
8	Hawaii Pacific	52

Regional semifinals Round of 32; March 13
3	Cal State Chico	86
7	Humboldt State	76
4	Alaska Anchorage	48
1	Seattle Pacific	52

Regional finals Sweet 16; March 15
3	Cal State Chico	68
1	Seattle Pacific	76

== Elite Eight - St. Joseph, Missouri ==
Location: St. Joseph Civic Arena Host: Missouri Western State University

National quarterfinals Elite Eight; March 23
Gannon	70
Tusculum	66
Emporia State	91
Michigan Tech	85
Franklin Pierce	77
Arkansas Tech	62
Fort Lewis	68
Seattle Pacific	59

National semifinals Final Four; March 24
Gannon	94
Emporia State	97*
Franklin Pierce	64
Fort Lewis	79

National championship March 26
Emporia State	65
Fort Lewis	53

== All-tournament team ==
- Alli Volkens, Emporia State
- Cassondra Boston, Emporia State
- Brittney Miller, Emporia State
- Laura Haugen, Fort Lewis
- Allison Rosel, Fort Lewis

== See also ==
- 2010 NCAA Division I women's basketball tournament
- 2010 NCAA Division III women's basketball tournament
- 2010 NAIA Division I women's basketball tournament
- 2010 NAIA Division II women's basketball tournament
- 2010 NCAA Division II men's basketball tournament
