= 2008 NCAA Division II women's basketball tournament =

- Teams: 64
- Finals site: Health and Sports Center, Kearney, Nebraska
- Champions: Northern Kentucky Norse (2nd title)
- Runner-up: South Dakota Coyotes (1st title game)
- Semifinalists: Alaska Anchorage Seawolves (1st Final Four); Delta State Lady Statesmen (8th Final Four)
- Winning coach: Nancy Winstel (2nd title)
- MOP: Angela Healy (Northern Kentucky)

The 2008 NCAA Division II women's basketball tournament was the 27th annual tournament hosted by the NCAA to determine the national champion of Division II women's collegiate basketball in the United States.

Northern Kentucky defeated South Dakota in the championship game, 63–58, to claim the Norse's second NCAA Division II national title and first since 2000.

As in 2007, the championship rounds were contested at the Health and Sports Center on the campus of the University of Nebraska at Kearney in Kearney, Nebraska.

== Regionals ==
=== East - Indiana, Pennsylvania ===
Location: Memorial Field House Host: Indiana University of Pennsylvania

First round Round of 64; March 14
1	Indiana (PA)	56
8	Mount Olive	62
5	Shepherd	65
4	West Liberty State	56
3	Anderson (SC)	62
6	Fairmont State	50
2	California	70
7	Millersville	54

Regional semifinals Round of 32; March 15
8	Mount Olive	66
5	Shepherd	74
3	Anderson (SC)	55
2	California (PA)	68

Regional finals Sweet Sixteen; March 17
5	Shepherd	71
2	California (PA)	86

=== Great Lakes - Springfield, Missouri ===
Location: Weiser Gymnasium Host: Drury University

First round Round of 64; March 14
8	Bellarmine	70
1	Drury	80
5	Indianapolis	54
4	Northern Kentucky	55
6	Michigan Tech	66
3	Missouri S&T	75
2	Hillsdale	73
7	Quincy (IL)	82

Regional semifinals Round of 32; March 15
1	Drury	65
4	Northern Kentucky	84
3	Missouri S&T	79
7	Quincy (IL)	73

Regional finals Sweet Sixteen; March 17
4	Northern Kentucky	60
3	Missouri S&T	52

=== North Central - Vermillion, South Dakota ===
Location: DakotaDome Host: University of South Dakota

First round Round of 64; March 14
8	CSU Pueblo	55
1	South Dakota	66
4	Fort Lewis	58
5	Nebraska–Kearney	66
3	Concordia–St. Paul	70
6	Minnesota State	73
2	North Dakota	78
7	Wayne State (NE)	85

Regional semifinals Round of 32; March 15
1	South Dakota	59
5	Nebraska–Kearney	48
6	Minnesota State	64
7	Wayne State (NE)	62

Regional finals Sweet Sixteen; March 17
1	South Dakota	61
6	Minnesota State	49

=== Northeast - Philadelphia, Pennsylvania ===
Location: Campus Center Gymnasium Host: Holy Family University

First round Round of 64; March 14
1	Holy Family	57
8	Molloy	39
5	Assumption	67
4	Bentley	58
6	Dominican (NY)	54
3	Franklin Pierce	66
7	Bryant	58
2	Stonehill	67

Regional semifinals Round of 32; March 15
1	Holy Family	73
5	Assumption	49
3	Franklin Pierce	68
2	Stonehill	56

Regional finals Sweet Sixteen; March 17
1	Holy Family	71
3	Franklin Pierce	88

=== South - Cleveland, Mississippi ===
Location: Walter Sillers Coliseum Host: Delta State University

First round Round of 64; March 14
1	Delta State	76
8	Kentucky State	34
4	Nova Southeastern	66
5	West Georgia	71
3	Tampa	73
6	Valdosta State	83
2	Arkansas Tech	82
7	Tuskegee	61

Regional semifinals Round of 32; March 15
1	Delta State	58
5	West Georgia	43
6	Valdosta State	58
2	Arkansas Tech	53

Regional finals Sweet Sixteen; March 17
1	Delta State	62
6	Valdosta State	44

=== South Atlantic - Florence, South Carolina ===
Location: Smith University Center Host: Francis Marion University

First round Round of 64; March 14
8	Johnson C. Smith	50
1	Wingate	61
5	Augusta State	88
4	Shaw	70
3	Clayton State	88
6	Francis Marion	69
7	Lander	83
2	Tusculum	78

Regional semifinals Round of 32; March 15
1	Wingate	66
5	Augusta State	65
3	Clayton State	83
7	Lander	72

Regional finals Sweet Sixteen; March 17
1	Wingate	82
3	Clayton State	72

=== South Central - Canyon, Texas ===
Location: First United Bank Center Host: West Texas A&M University

First round Round of 64; March 14
8	NW Missouri State	72*
1	West Texas A&M	71
4	Emporia State	82
5	Southwest Baptist	66
3	Central Oklahoma	73*
6	St. Mary's (TX)	70
7	Angelo State	44
2	Washburn	69

Regional semifinals Round of 32; March 15
8	NW Missouri State	71
4	Emporia State	83
3	Central Oklahoma	66
2	Washburn	73

Regional finals Sweet Sixteen; March 17
4	Emporia State	58
2	Washburn	73

=== West - Seattle, Washington ===
Location: Royal Brougham Pavilion Host: Seattle Pacific University

First round Round of 64; March 14
8	Saint Martin's	42
1	Seattle Pacific	92
4	UC San Diego	59
5	Cal State San Bernardino	46
3	Alaska Anchorage	70
6	Sonoma State	53
2	Chico State	65
7	Northwest Nazarene	56

Regional semifinals Round of 32; March 15
1	Seattle Pacific	76
4	UC San Diego	67
3	Alaska Anchorage	65
2	Chico State	47

Regional finals Sweet Sixteen; March 17
1	Seattle Pacific	44
3	Alaska Anchorage	50

== Elite Eight - Kearney, Nebraska ==
Location: Cushing Coliseum Host: University of Nebraska at Kearney

National quarterfinals Elite Eight; March 26
S	Delta State	75
E	California (PA)	64
NC	South Dakota	85**
SC	Washburn	80
W	Alaska Anchorage	71
NE	Franklin Pierce	65
GL	Northern Kentucky	78
SA	Wingate	65

National semifinals Final Four; March 27
S	Delta State	58
NC	South Dakota	68
W	Alaska Anchorage	54
GL	Northern Kentucky	57

National championship March 29
NC	South Dakota	58
GL	Northern Kentucky	63

== All-tournament team ==
- Angela Healy, Northern Kentucky
- Cassie Brannen, Northern Kentucky
- Jeana Hoffman, South Dakota
- Bridget Yoerger, South Dakota
- Johannah Leedham, Franklin Pierce

== See also ==
- 2008 NCAA Division I women's basketball tournament
- 2008 NCAA Division III women's basketball tournament
- 2008 NAIA Division I women's basketball tournament
- 2008 NAIA Division II women's basketball tournament
- 2008 NCAA Division II men's basketball tournament
