= 2015 NCAA Division II women's basketball tournament =

- Teams: 64
- Finals site: Sanford Pentagon, Sioux Falls, South Dakota
- Champions: California (PA) (2nd title)
- Runner-up: California Baptist (1st title game)
- Semifinalists: Emporia State (4th Final Four); Limestone (1st Final Four)
- Winning coach: Jess Strom (1st title)
- MOP: Kaitlynn Fratz (California (PA))

The 2015 NCAA Division II women's basketball tournament was the 34th annual tournament hosted by the NCAA to determine the national champion of Division II women's collegiate basketball in the United States.

California (PA) defeated California Baptist in the championship game, 86–69, to claim the Vulcans' second NCAA Division II national title and first since 2004.

The championship rounds were contested at the Sanford Pentagon in Sioux Falls, South Dakota.

== Regionals ==
=== Atlantic - California, Pennsylvania ===
Location: Hamer Hall Host: California University of Pennsylvania

First round Round of 64; March 13
1	California (PA)	86
8	Virginia State	75
4	West Chester	85
5	West Liberty	88 (OT)
3	Bloomsburg	81
6	Gannon	76
2	Indiana (PA)	60
7	Shepherd	68

Regional semifinals Round of 32; March 14
1	California (PA)	69
5	West Liberty	64
3	Bloomsburg	85
7	Shepherd	69

Regional finals Sweet 16; March 16
1	California (PA)	72 (OT)
3	Bloomsburg	69

=== South - Jackson, Tennessee ===
Location: Fred DeLay Gymnasium Host: Union University

First round Round of 64; March 13
1	Union (TN)	92
8	Albany State	83
4	West Florida	78
5	Benedict	58
3	Eckerd	71
6	Rollins	73
2	Nova Southeastern	66
7	Kentucky State	56

Regional semifinals Round of 32; March 14
1	Union (TN)	75
4	West Florida	66
6	Rollins	51
2	Nova Southeastern	63

Regional finals Sweet 16; March 16
1	Union (TN)	62
2	Nova Southeastern	67

=== Central - Hays, Kansas ===
Location: Gross Memorial Coliseum Host: Fort Hays State University

First round Round of 64; March 13
1	Fort Hays State	74
8	Minnesota State	57
4	Wayne State (NE)	87
5	Harding	80
3	Pittsburg State	60
6	Northern State	53
2	Emporia State	68
7	Arkansas Tech	51

Regional semifinals Round of 32; March 14
1	Fort Hays State	70
4	Wayne State (NE)	54
3	Pittsburg State	54
2	Emporia State	65 (OT)

Regional finals Sweet 16; March 16
1	Fort Hays State	61
2	Emporia State	66

=== South Central - Canyon, Texas ===
Location: First United Bank Center Host: West Texas A&M University

First round Round of 64; March 13
1	West Texas A&M	80
8	Cameron	61
4	Colorado Mesa	65
5	Arkansas-Fort Smith	68
3	Midwestern State	57
6	Colorado Christian	67
2	UC-Colorado Springs	73
7	Colorado State-Pueblo	63

Regional semifinals Round of 32; March 14
1	West Texas A&M	70
5	Arkansas-Fort Smith	57
6	Colorado Christian	77
2	UC-Colorado Springs	83

Regional finals Sweet 16; March 16
1	West Texas A&M	96
2	UC-Colorado Springs	69

=== West - Anchorage, Alaska ===
Location: Alaska Airlines Center Host: University of Alaska at Anchorage

First round Round of 64; March 13
1	Alaska Anchorage	63
8	Point Loma	64
4	Hawaii Pacific	69
5	California Baptist	77
3	Humboldt State	62
6	Seattle Pacific	77
2	Cal State Dominguez Hills	57
7	Cal Poly Pomona	61

Regional semifinals Round of 32; March 14
8	Point Loma	46
5	California Baptist	73
6	Seattle Pacific	74
7	Cal Poly Pomona	90

Regional finals Sweet 16; March 16
5	California Baptist	81
7	Cal Poly Pomona	58

=== East - Garden City, New York ===
Location: New York Center for Recreation and Sport Host: Adelphi University

First round Round of 64; March 13
1	Adelphi	79
8	Holy Family	84
4	Stonehill	80
5	Queens (NY)	66
3	District of Columbia	66
6	Franklin Pierce	78
2	New Haven	69
7	Jefferson	55

Regional semifinals Round of 32; March 14
8	Holy Family	60
4	Stonehill	67
6	Franklin Pierce	59
2	New Haven	69

Regional finals Sweet 16; March 16
4	Stonehill	57
2	New Haven	58

=== Southeast - Gaffney, South Carolina ===
Location: Timken Center Host: Limestone College

First round Round of 64; March 13
1	Limestone	76
8	Catawba	62
4	Lander	57
5	Wingate	72
3	Anderson (SC)	69
6	Newberry	57
2	Columbus State	58
7	Carson-Newman	40

Regional semifinals Round of 32; March 14
1	Limestone	77
5	Wingate	66
3	Anderson (SC)	71
2	Columbus State	53

Regional finals Sweet 16; March 16
1	Limestone	72
3	Anderson (SC)	38

=== Midwest - Houghton, Michigan ===
Location: SDC Gym Host: Michigan Technological University

First round Round of 64; March 13
1	Michigan Tech	71
8	Cedarville	59
4	Southern Indiana	61
5	Ashland	81
3	Drury	61
6	Wayne State (MI)	75
2	Lewis	80
7	Wisconsin-Parkside	66

Regional semifinals Round of 32; March 14
1	Michigan Tech	51
5	Ashland	70
6	Wayne State (MI)	63
2	Lewis	71

Regional finals Sweet 16; March 16
5	Ashland	76
2	Lewis	83

== Elite Eight - Sioux Falls, South Dakota ==
Location: Sanford Pentagon Host: Northern Sun Intercollegiate Conference

National quarterfinals Elite Eight; March 24
California (PA)	84
Nova Southeastern	79
Emporia State	62
West Texas A&M	50
California Baptist	86
New Haven	77
Limestone	61
Lewis	58

National semifinals Final Four; March 25
California (PA)	51
Emporia State	46
California Baptist	85
Limestone	67

National championship March 27
California (PA)	86
California Baptist	69

== All-tournament team ==
- Kaitlynn Fratz, California (PA)
- Miki Glenn, California (PA)
- Emma Mahady, California (PA)
- Darsha Burnside, California Baptist
- Courtney Nelson, California Baptist

== See also ==
- 2015 NCAA Division I women's basketball tournament
- 2015 NCAA Division III women's basketball tournament
- 2015 NAIA Division I women's basketball tournament
- 2015 NAIA Division II women's basketball tournament
- 2015 NCAA Division II men's basketball tournament
