= 2010 NCAA Division III women's basketball tournament =

- Teams: 64
- Finals site: Shirk Center, Bloomington, Illinois
- Champions: WashU Bears (5th title)
- Runner-up: Hope Flying Dutchmen (2nd title game)
- Third place: Amherst Lord Jeffs (2nd Final Four)
- Fourth place: Rochester Yellowjackets (3rd Final Four)
- Winning coach: Nancy Fahey (5th title)
- MOP: Jaimie McFarlin (Washington University in St. Louis)
- Attendance: 27,490

The 2010 NCAA Division III women's basketball tournament was the 29th annual tournament hosted by the NCAA to determine the national champion of Division III women's collegiate basketball in the United States.

Washington St. Louis defeated Hope in the championship game, 65–59, to claim the Bears' fifth Division III national title and first since 2001.

Illinois Wesleyan University hosted the championship round at the Shirk Center in Bloomington, Illinois, from March 19 to 20.

== Qualifying ==
After five years with sixty-three teams, the team expanded by one to its current size of sixty-four. With the change, all teams began to play in the First Round.

== Bracket ==
=== Top left sectional ===
First round March 5, 2010; Regional sites
Amherst	68
MCLA	47
Amherst, MA
Southern Maine	74
RPI	63
Ithaca	53
DeSales	62
Ithaca, NY
Mount Saint Mary	56
Williams	62
Moravian	61
Utica	64
Allentown, PA
Farmingdale State	57
Gettysburg	68
Colby	62
Husson	59
Waterville, ME
Emmanuel (MA)	56
Babson	76

Second round March 6, 2010; Regional sites
Amherst	76
Southern Maine	49
DeSales	77
William	94
Utica	55
Gettysburg	71
Colby	73
Babson	76

Sectional semifinals March 12, 2010; Amherst, MA
Amherst	71
Williams	66
Gettysburg	68
Babson	71

Sectional finals March 13, 2010; Amherst, MA
Amherst	80
Babson	65

=== Bottom left sectional ===
First round March 5, 2010; Regional sites
George Fox	65
Louisiana College	45
Newberg, OR
Puget Sound	54
Redlands	42
UW Whitewater	91
St. Thomas (MN)	73
Whitewater, WI
Carthage	73
Northland	60
Washington St. Louis	81
Maryville (TN)	67
Crestview Hills, KY
Thomas More	68
Fontbonne	49
Messiah	64
Neumann	55
Grantham, PA
Mount Union	71
Washington & Jefferson	48

Second round March 6, 2010; Regional sites
George Fox	59
Puget Sound	37
UW Whitewater	74
Carthage	79
Washington St. Louis	80
Thomas More	64
Messiah	61
Mount Union	62

Sectional semifinals March 12, 2010; St. Louis, MO
George Fox	55
Carthage	48
Washington St. Louis	76
Mount Union	57

Sectional finals March 13, 2010; St. Louis, MO
George Fox	52
Washington St. Louis	59

=== Top right sectional ===
First round March 5, 2010; Regional sites
Kean	105
Penn State Berks	68
Union Township, NJ
Tufts	71
Muhlenberg	59
Bowdoin	67
Baruch	53
Brunswick, ME
Western Conn. State	59
U. New England	41
Christopher Newport	68
Washington & Lee	51
Newport News, VA
Roanoke	77
McDaniel	66
William Paterson	53
Mary Washington	84
Rochester, NY
Rochester	66
SUNY Cortland	47

Second round March 6, 2010; Regional sites
Kean	75
Tufts	56
Bowdoin	65
Western Conn. State	43
Christopher Newport	72
Roanoke	48
Mary Washington	54
Rochester	61

Sectional semifinals March 12, 2010; Union Township, NJ
Kean	62
Bowdoin	51
Christopher Newport	69
Rochester	74

Sectional finals March 13, 2010; Union Township, NJ
Kean	65
Rochester	68

=== Bottom right sectional ===
First round March 5, 2010; Regional sites
Illinois Wesleyan	76
Franklin	52
Bloomington, IL
Simpson	66
Chicago	53
UW Stevens Point	86
Minnesota–Morris	64
De Pere, WI
St. Norbert	78
Calvin	67
Hope	68
Denison	40
Holland, MI
DePauw	79
Lakeland	46
Marymount (VA)	57
Scranton	41
Marymount, VA
Lebanon Valley	63
Medaille	64

Second round March 6, 2010; Regional sites
Illinois Wesleyan	83
Simpson	53
UW Stevens Point	71
St. Norbert	58
Hope	68
DePauw	54
Marymount (VA)	74
Medaille	44

Sectional semifinals March 12, 2010; Bloomington, IL
Illinois Wesleyan	76
UW Stevens Point	77
Hope	53
Marymount (VA)	46

Sectional finals March 13, 2010; Bloomington, IL
UW Stevens Point	64
Hope	71

=== Final Four ===
Final Four; March 19, 2010; Bloomington, IL
Amherst	75
Washington St. Louis	86*
Rochester	65
Hope	76

National championship March 20, 2010; Bloomington, IL
Washington St. Louis	65
Hope	59
Third place
Amherst	56
Rochester	44

== All-tournament team ==
- Jaimie McFarlin, Washington University in St. Louis
- Zoë Unruh, Washington University in St. Louis
- Carrie Snikkers, Hope
- Sarah Leyman, Amherst
- Melissa Alwardt, Rochester

== See also ==
- 2010 NCAA Division I women's basketball tournament
- 2010 NCAA Division II women's basketball tournament
- 2010 NAIA Division I women's basketball tournament
- 2010 NAIA Division II women's basketball tournament
- 2010 NCAA Division III men's basketball tournament
