= 2010 NAIA Division I women's basketball tournament =

- Teams: 32
- Finals site: Oman Arena, Jackson, Tennessee
- Champions: Union University Bulldogs (5th title, 7th title game, 11th Fab Four)
- Runner-up: Azusa Pacific Cougars (1st title game, 1st Fab Four)
- Semifinalists: Lee Flames (1st Fab Four); Oklahoma City Stars (10th Fab Four)
- Coach of the year: Mark Campbell (Union (TN))
- Player of the year: Whitney Ballinger; Bridgette Reyes (Campbellsville, Vanguard)
- Charles Stevenson Hustle Award: Alex Barone (Saint Xavier)
- Chuck Taylor MVP: Zeinab Chan (Union (TN))
- Top scorer: Whitney Ballinger (Campbellsville) (91 points)

The 2010 NAIA Division I women's basketball tournament was the tournament held by the NAIA to determine the national champion of women's college basketball among its Division I members in the United States and Canada for the 2009–10 basketball season.

Defending champions and hometown team Union (TN) defeated Azusa Pacific in the championship game, 73–65, to claim the Bulldogs' fifth NAIA national title.

The tournament was played at the Oman Arena in Jackson, Tennessee from March 17–23, 2010.

== Qualification ==
The tournament field remained fixed at thirty-two teams, which were sorted into four quadrants of eight teams each. Within each quadrant, teams were seeded sequentially from one to eight based on record and season performance.

The tournament continued to utilize a simple single-elimination format.

== Bracket ==
First round March 17–18
1	Union (TN)	86
8	SAGU	47
5	Southern Poly	62
4	McKendree	52
3	Westminster (UT)	67
6	Lambuth	55
7	Oklahoma Christian	66
2	Point Loma Nazarene	63
2	Campbellsville	64
7	LSU Shreveport	55
6	Trevecca Nazarene	71
3	William Woods	64
4	Lewis–Clark State	64
5	Biola	55
8	Shorter	49
1	Oklahoma City	71
1	Vanguard	64*
8	Lindsey Wilson	57
5	Bethel (TN)	61
4	Columbia (MO)	56
3	Lee (TN)	65
6	Langston	63
7	William Jewell	57
2	Oklahoma Baptist	64
2	Azusa Pacific	71
7	Montana Tech	57
6	Lubbock Christian	64
3	Freed–Hardeman	73
4	Cumberlands (KY)	67*
5	Xavier Louisiana	62
8	Evangel	71
1	Saint Xavier	81

Second round March 19
1	Union (TN)	70
5	Southern Polytechnic State	43
3	Westminster (UT)	52
7	Oklahoma Christian	62
2	Campbellsville	75
6	Trevecca Nazarene	57
4	Lewis–Clark State	59
1	Oklahoma City	87
1	Vanguard	75*
5	Bethel (TN)	69
3	Lee (TN)	57
2	Oklahoma Baptist	53
2	Azusa Pacific	59
3	Freed–Hardeman	53
4	Cumberlands (KY)	67
1	Saint Xavier	71

Quarterfinals; March 20
1	Union (TN)	83
7	Oklahoma Christian	55
2	Campbellsville	77
1	Oklahoma City	86*
1	Vanguard	50
3	Lee (TN)	65
2	Azusa Pacific	73
1	Saint Xavier	69

Semifinals; March 22
1	Union (TN)	63
1	Oklahoma City	61
3	Lee (TN)	60
2	Azusa Pacific	64

National championship March 23
1	Union (TN)	73
2	Azusa Pacific	65

== See also ==
- 2010 NAIA Division I men's basketball tournament
- 2010 NCAA Division I women's basketball tournament
- 2010 NCAA Division II women's basketball tournament
- 2010 NCAA Division III women's basketball tournament
- 2010 NAIA Division II women's basketball tournament
