= LeRoy Gardner Jr. =

American basketball player and professor

Personal information
- Born: May 11, 1947 Saint Paul, Minnesota
- Died: September 6, 2008 (aged 61) Saint Paul, Minnesota
- Listed height: 6 ft 4 in (1.93 m)
- Listed weight: 200 lb (91 kg)

Career information
- High school: St. Paul Central (Saint Paul, Minnesota)
- College: Minnesota (1966–1969)
- Position: Guard

LeRoy Gardner, Jr. (May 11, 1947 – September 6, 2008) was a collegiate basketball player and college professor. At 6'4", he played guard for the University of Minnesota from 1966 to 1969.

Gardner, as a 14-year-old, alongside Ralph Mitchell (19) and Tommy Miller (19) beat (then) University of Minnesota basketball players Lou Hudson, Don Yates and Archie Clark in a pickup game at St. Paul's Oxford Park. Gardner went on to play for St. Paul Central High School from 1962 to 1965 and helped take the team to its first state tournament berth in years. He scored 41 points in a region semifinal and 33 points in a consolation title game. He was recruited by coach John Kundla and was the first African American man born and raised in Minnesota to receive a full basketball scholarship at the University of Minnesota. Gardner earned undergraduate and master's degrees in psychology at the University of Minnesota.

After his playing career was over, he remained at Minnesota and was an academic adviser in the athletic department when he was caught up in the scandal involving NCAA rules violations in the late 1980s. Football coach Lou Holtz, Gardner said, had given him $500 for a football player. Gardner alleged that he was told "point-blank to lie," but when the time came to talk to NCAA investigators, he told the truth. Years after the scandal, Gardner returned to the University and was a professor in the General College department, focusing on multicultural relations. Gardner, 61, was diagnosed with lung cancer in December 2007 and died September 6, 2008, at Our Lady of Good Counsel in St. Paul, Minnesota.

Gardner was married to Claudia Wallace-Gardner for 27 years. They had four children.
