= 2008 NAIA Division I women's basketball tournament =

- Teams: 32
- Finals site: Oman Arena, Jackson, Tennessee
- Champions: Vanguard Lions (1st title, 1st title game, 4th Fab Four)
- Runner-up: Trevecca Nazarene Trojans (1st title game, 1st Fab Four)
- Semifinalists: Freed–Hardeman Lions (2nd Fab Four); Union University Bulldogs (9th Fab Four)
- Coach of the year: Russ Davis (Vanguard)
- Player of the year: Josephine Owino (Union (TN))
- Charles Stevenson Hustle Award: Kiely Schork (Loyola New Orleans)
- Chuck Taylor MVP: Jessica Richter (Vanguard)
- Top scorer: Melissa Cook (Vanguard) (88 points)

The 2008 NAIA Division I women's basketball tournament was the tournament held by the NAIA to determine the national champion of women's college basketball among its Division I members in the United States and Canada for the 2007–08 basketball season.

Vanguard defeated Trevecca Nazarene in the championship game, 72–59, to claim the Lions' first NAIA national title.

The tournament was played at the Oman Arena in Jackson, Tennessee.

== Qualification ==
The tournament field remained fixed at thirty-two teams, which were sorted into one of four quadrants and seeded from 1 to 8 within each quadrant.

The tournament continued to utilize a simple single-elimination format.

== Bracket ==
First round
1 | Oklahoma City | 64
8 | Harris–Stowe State | 73
5 | Westmont | 59
4 | Carroll (MT) | 61
3 | Lambuth | 73
6 | Xavier Louisiana | 56
7 | Cumberlands (KY) | 62
2 | Vanguard | 75
2 | Oklahoma Baptist | 74
7 | Lindsey Wilson | 78
6 | McKendree | 49
3 | Lewis–Clark State | 69
5 | Olivet Nazarene | 95
4 | The Master's | 99
8 | USAO | 66
1 | Union (TN) | 95
1 | Lee (TN) | 66
8 | Brescia | 60
5 | Lubbock Christian | 81
4 | Saint Xavier | 78
3 | Azusa Pacific | 63
6 | Wiley | 69
7 | Georgetown (KY) | 61
2 | Freed–Hardeman | 68
2 | Langston | 75
7 | Berry | 68
6 | Trevecca Nazarene | 85
3 | Southern Nazarene | 56
5 | Westminster (UT) | 62
4 | Loyola New Orleans | 73
8 | Robert Morris (IL) | 41
1 | Point Loma Nazarene | 60

Second round
8 | Harris–Stowe State | 53
4 | Carroll (MT) | 62
3 | Lambuth | 67
2 | Vanguard | 70
7 | Lindsey Wilson | 61
3 | Lewis–Clark State | 73
4 | The Master's | 78
1 | Union (TN) | 95
1 | Lee (TN) | 60
5 | Lubbock Christian | 76
6 | Wiley | 68
2 | Freed–Hardeman | 75
2 | Langston | 66
6 | Trevecca Nazarene | 78
4 | Loyola New Orleans | 71
1 | Point Loma Nazarene | 64

Quarterfinals
4 | Carroll (MT) | 56
2 | Vanguard | 71
3 | Lewis–Clark State | 57
1 | Union (TN) | 82
5 | Lubbock Christian | 70
2 | Freed–Hardeman | 76
6 | Trevecca Nazarene | 68
4 | Loyola New Orleans | 50

Semifinals
2 | Vanguard | 74
1 | Union (TN) | 72
2 | Freed–Hardeman | 59
6 | Trevecca Nazarene | 69

National championship
2 | Vanguard | 72
6 | Trevecca Nazarene | 59

== See also ==
- 2008 NAIA Division I men's basketball tournament
- 2008 NCAA Division I women's basketball tournament
- 2008 NCAA Division II women's basketball tournament
- 2008 NCAA Division III women's basketball tournament
- 2008 NAIA Division II women's basketball tournament
