= 2008 NCAA Division III women's basketball tournament =

- Teams: 63
- Finals site: DeVos Fieldhouse, Holland, Michigan
- Champions: Howard Payne Yellow Jackets (1st title)
- Runner-up: Messiah Falcons (2nd title game)
- Third place: Oglethorpe Stormy Petrels (1st Final Four)
- Fourth place: Wisconsin–Whitewater Warhawks (1st Final Four)
- Winning coach: Chris Kielsmeier (1st title)
- MOP: Meia Daniels (Howard Payne)
- Attendance: 29,800

The 2008 NCAA Division III women's basketball tournament was the 27th annual tournament hosted by the NCAA to determine the national champion of Division III women's collegiate basketball in the United States.

Howard Payne defeated Messiah in the championship game, 68–54, to claim the Yellow Jackets' first Division III national title.

The championship rounds were hosted by Hope College at the DeVos Fieldhouse in Holland, Michigan from March 21–22.

== Qualifying ==
For the third consecutive year, the tournament featured sixty-three teams. All teams but one, Howard Payne, started play in the First Round, with the Yellow Jackets receiving the singular bye to the Second Round.

== Bracket ==
=== Top left sectional ===
First round March 7, 2008; Regional sites
Cabrini	34
Messiah	63
Grantham, PA
William Paterson	57
St. Lawrence	64
Eastern Conn. State	66
Rochester	71
Scranton, PA
Medaille	56
Scranton	54
Wheaton (MA)	67
Tufts	71
Newburgh, NY
Albright	62
Mount Saint Mary	75
Bridgewater (VA)	52
TCNJ	65
Fredericksburg, VA
Baruch	58
Mary Washington	73

Second round March 8, 2008; Regional sites
Messiah	64
St. Lawrence	49
Rochester	69
Medaille	50
Tufts	54
Mount Saint Mary	38
TCNJ	50
Mary Washington	56

Sectional semifinals March 14, 2008; Grantham, PA
Messiah	73
Rochester	61
Tufts	48
Mary Washington	45

Sectional finals March 15, 2008; Grantham, PA
Messiah	55
Tufts	49

=== Bottom left sectional ===
First round March 7, 2008; Regional sites
Brandeis	74
Southern Maine	71
Union Township, NJ
Utica	76
Kean	83
St. Thomas (MN)	59
Chicago	62
Stevens Point, WI
St. Norbert	71
UW Stevens Point	57
Colby-Sawyer	72
William Smith	76
Geneva, NY
Emmanuel (MA)	64
Brockport State	68
Piedmont	78
Oglethorpe	91
Crestview Hills, KY
Greensboro	63
Thomas More	76

Second round March 8, 2008; Regional sites
Brandeis	61
Kean	95
Chicago	65
Saint Norbert	52
William Smith	78
Brockport State	73
Oglethorpe	65
Thomas More	55

Sectional semifinals March 14, 2008; Union Township, NJ
Kean	70
Chicago	56
William Smith	63
Oglethorpe	69

Sectional finals March 15, 2008; Union Township, NJ
Kean	86
Oglethorpe	98

=== Top right sectional ===
First round March 7, 2008; Regional sites
Abilene, TX/Brownwood, TX
Trinity (TX)	67
McMurry	71
Muhlenberg	48
DeSales	56
Allentown, PA
Salem State	73
Marymount (VA)	63
La Verne	58
Puget Sound	74
Tacoma, WA
Chapman	55
George Fox	71
D'Youville	53
Baldwin-Wallace	83
Berea, OH
Juniata	47
Hope	76

Second round March 8, 2008; Regional sites
Howard Payne	79
McMurry	64
DeSales	74
Salem State	55
Puget Sound	66
George Fox	72
Baldwin-Wallace	48
Hope	68

Sectional semifinals March 14, 2008; Brownwood, TX
Howard Payne	69
DeSales	42
George Fox	47
Hope	40

Sectional finals March 15, 2008; Brownwood, TX
Howard Payne	53
George Fox	49

=== Bottom right sectional ===
First round March 7, 2008; Regional sites
Gustavus Adolphus	64
Simpson	73
Indianola, IA
Carleton	52
UW Eau Claire	61
Manchester	60
UW Whitewater	77
Bloomington, IL
Maryville (MO)	77
Illinois Wesleyan	111
Becker	32
Amherst	78
Bridgewater, MA
Bowdoin	64
Bridgewater State	49
Washington St. Louis	73
Wilmington (OH)	72
Greencastle, IN
Denison	53
DePauw Tigers	70

Second round March 8, 2008; Regional sites
Simpson	70
UW Eau Claire	63
UW Whitewater	87
Illinois Wesleyan	63
Amherst	61
Bowdoin	60
Washington St. Louis	66
DePauw	73

Sectional semifinals March 14, 2008; Whitewater, WI
Simpson	69
UW Whitewater	96
Amherst	63
DePauw	68

Sectional finals March 15, 2008; Whitewater, WI
UW Whitewater	83
DePauw	80

=== Final Four ===
Final Four; March 21, 2008; Holland, MI; DeVos Fieldhouse
Messiah	80
Oglethorpe	60
Howard Payne	69
UW Whitewater	59

National championship March 22, 2008; Holland, MI; DeVos Fieldhouse
Messiah	54
Howard Payne	68
Third place
Oglethorpe	67
UW Whitewater	80

== All-tournament team ==
- Meia Daniels, Howard Payne
- Kim Hoffman, Howard Payne
- Nikki Lobach, Messiah
- Tina Grace, Oglethorpe
- Tiffany Morton, Wisconsin–Whitewater

== See also ==
- 2008 NCAA Division I women's basketball tournament
- 2008 NCAA Division II women's basketball tournament
- 2008 NAIA Division I women's basketball tournament
- 2008 NAIA Division II women's basketball tournament
- 2008 NCAA Division III men's basketball tournament
