= DeVos Fieldhouse =

Indoor arena in Holland, Michigan

Coordinates: 42.7887°N 86.0955°W

Richard and Helen DeVos Fieldhouse
- Interactive map of Richard and Helen DeVos Fieldhouse
- Address: 222 Fairbanks Avenue
- Location: Holland, Michigan
- Capacity: Basketball: 3,400; Concerts: 4,000–4,600

Construction
- Opened: Fall 2005
- Cost: $22 million ($36.3 million in 2025 dollars)

Tenants
- Hope Flying Dutchmen men's basketball (NCAA) (2005–present); Hope Flying Dutch women's basketball (NCAA) (2005–present)

DeVos Fieldhouse is a 3,400-seat indoor arena in Holland, Michigan. It was built in 2005, at a cost of $22 million. It is home to Hope College's men's and women's basketball teams, the Hope Flying Dutchmen and the Hope Flying Dutch and Hope College's volleyball team.

It is also used for other events. As a concert venue it can seat up to 4000 for end-stage shows and up to 4600 for center-stage shows; both are capacities of the largest theaters of metropolitan areas of the Grand Rapids area's population size. It is also used for graduations, conferences and other special events.
