= Mountain State University =

Private university in Beckley, West Virginia, US

Coordinates: 37°46′33″N 81°11′3″W

- Type: Private university
- Active: 1933; 93 years ago – 2012; 14 years ago
- President: Richard E. Sours
- Students: 8,200
- Location: Beckley, West Virginia, United States
- Colors: Blue and Silver
- Mascot: Cougar
- Website: www.mountainstate.edu

Mountain State University (MSU) was a private university in Beckley, West Virginia, United States. It closed in 2013. It was formerly named Beckley College and then The College of West Virginia.

Its Beckley campus is now the campus of West Virginia University Institute of Technology. Its other campus in Martinsburg, West Virginia, was sold to a private developer.

== History ==
=== Early history ===
The university was founded in 1933 as Beckley College, a junior college, and continued as such until 1991, when it achieved four-year status and was renamed The College of West Virginia. In 2001, the school was renamed Mountain State University.

=== Later history ===
Mountain State University's former president since 1990, Charles H. Polk, was widely credited for much of the school's previous success. However, many blamed Polk along with his senior administration and MSU's board of trustees when the university began facing issues over its continued accreditation. Polk and MSU's board of trustees were named as defendants in over 300 lawsuits arising out of the loss of the university's accreditation. A settlement was reached under which MSU admitted no wrongdoing.

In 2009, Polk received over $1.8 million in compensation. According to The Chronicle of Higher Education, Polk was the sixth-highest-paid private-college president in the country that year. However, according to Jerry Ice, then-chairman of the Mountain State University Board of Trustees, Polk’s actual 2009 salary was $450,000, and included a one-time deferred retirement package that the board established in 2004 and was required to pay out in 2009. As a means of recouping the funds for MSU, the board also purchased a $2 million insurance policy on Polk that will be paid back to the institution upon his death.

On January 19, 2012, Jerry Ice, former chairman of Mountain State University's board of trustees, announced the termination of Polk's employment as president of Mountain State University. Richard E. Sours was chosen to replace Polk as interim president until the university's closing.

=== Loss of accreditation ===
On June 28, 2012, the Higher Learning Commission, the regional accrediting authority for the North Central Association of Colleges and Schools, withdrew the accreditation of Mountain State University, effective August 27, 2012. The date was subsequently extended until December 31, 2012, to allow the university to "teach out" those students close to graduation.

On August 6, 2012, MSU's board of trustees formally appealed the withdrawal of MSU's accreditation with the Higher Learning Commission. On December 18, 2012, the appeals panel voted to sustain the commission's action. MSU's regional accreditation was terminated on December 31, 2012. All degrees conferred by MSU on or before this date are valid and are accredited by the Higher Learning Commission. MSU closed effective January 1, 2013.

In May 2014, the Mountain State University Board of Trustees filed a lawsuit against the Higher Learning Commission seeking to restore the university's accreditation. In 2017, the United States District Court for the Southern District of West Virginia granted the Higher Learning Commission's motion for summary judgment, effectively ending MSU's lawsuit in favor of the Higher Learning Commission.

On August 13, 2014, UC announced that a settlement had been reached between itself, MSU, and the plaintiffs in various lawsuits arising out of the loss of MSU's accreditation. MSU's insurance company established an $8.5 million fund to compensate affected students and MSU liquidated its remaining assets. The settlement was given preliminary court approval on October 6, 2014. Final court approval was given on March 9, 2015. MSU's former Beckley campus was sold to West Virginia University. MSU ceased to exist as a legal entity on May 17, 2018.

The University of Charleston is the permanent custodian of MSU's student records. Transcripts from Beckley College, The College of West Virginia and Mountain State University may be purchased through the National Student Clearinghouse.

=== Reuse of campuses ===
On August 1, 2012, the University of Charleston (UC) announced that they would assist MSU in the 'teach-out' process, and would admit any MSU student in good standing who chose to attend UC. UC also announced that it would establish new four-year campuses on the Beckley and Martinsburg sites, to be known as the University of Charleston-Beckley and University of Charleston-Martinsburg, respectively.

The University of Charleston established campuses on MSU's former Beckley and Martinsburg, West Virginia locations on January 1, 2013. UC later vacated the former Martinsburg campus (the property was sold to a third-party buyer), and established a new location in Martinsburg.

UC vacated the former Beckley campus after the 2014-15 academic year and established a new campus in Beckley. On December 31, 2014, West Virginia University announced that it would purchase MSU’s former Beckley campus for $8 million. On September 1, 2015, the WVU board of governors approved a plan to move the West Virginia University Institute of Technology from its then-current campus in Montgomery to the former MSU campus in Beckley.

== Academics ==
The university offered more than 60 undergraduate, master's, and certificate programs, as well as a doctoral degree program. Most of the university's programs focused on the professions in business, technology, and health and human services. Many of MSU's degree programs were available online.

=== College preparatory school ===
From 2002 to 2010, Mountain State University operated a private, nonsectarian college preparatory school from grades K–12 known as the Academy at Mountain State University, or Mountain State Academy (MSA), in Beckley, West Virginia. The school was also occasionally referred to as MSU Academy.

Although founded in 2002, MSA classes first began during the 2003–2004 academic year with grades 8–10. During the 2004–2005 academic year, the academy eliminated its eighth grade class, but added an eleventh grade class to accommodate advancing sophomores. During the 2005–2006 academic year, the academy became a full-fledged high school, adding a twelfth grade to accommodate advancing juniors. The class of 2006 became the academy's first graduating class. Members of the class of 2007 were the first students to attend the academy for all four of their respective high school years. The school later added grades 6–8 and eventually grades K–6. The class of 2010 was the academy's last graduating class.

MSA students were permitted to take classes at MSU for both weighted academy and college credit free of charge (less the cost of MSU textbooks). Admission to the academy was based on a student's scholastic merit. The cost of attending the academy was originally approximately $8,000.00 per academic year, plus the cost of textbooks and meals at MSU. However, the academy later adopted a sliding scale for tuition based on a student's household income. All students with a 3.5 cumulative GPA or above were designated as honor graduates. The academy also hosted a chapter of The National Honor Society. MSA students were required to attend the academy for at least three years in order to be considered for the titles of valedictorian, salutatorian, or honorarian.

The academy was permanently closed in August 2010. Enrollment stood at approximately 100 students at the school's closing. The academy's basketball team, which was nicknamed the Falcons, defeated nationally ranked Oak Hill Academy in 2010.

== Athletics ==
The Mountain State athletic teams were called the Cougars. The university was a member of the National Association of Intercollegiate Athletics (NAIA), primarily competing in the Kentucky Intercollegiate Athletic Conference (KIAC; now currently known as the River States Conference (RSC) since the 2016–17 school year) from 2007–08 to 2011–12 (all sports excluding men's basketball, which only competed as an NAIA Independent during that tenure until a few seasons after [2009–10]). The Cougars previously competed in the defunct West Virginia Intercollegiate Athletic Conference (WVIAC) (then affiliated with the NAIA, later affiliated in the Division II ranks of the National Collegiate Athletic Association (NCAA)) from 1946–47 to 1976–77.

Mountain State competed in nine intercollegiate varsity sports: Men's sports included basketball, cross country, soccer and track & field; while women's sports included cheerleading, cross country, soccer, track & field and volleyball.

Mountain State won the 2004 NAIA Division I men's basketball tournament. Mountain State was the national runner-up in the 2003 NAIA Division I men's basketball tournament. Additionally, the Cougars were the national runner-up in the 2008 NAIA Division I men's basketball tournament and in the 2011 NAIA Division I men's basketball tournament. MSU advanced to the final four in 2012.

== Notable alumni ==
- Robert Byrd, United States Senator
- Charles Sheedy - Member of the West Virginia House of Delegates
- Clovis Watson Jr. - Former member of the Florida House of Representatives
