= 2008 NAIA Division I men's basketball tournament =

College basketball tournament

- 2008 Buffalo Funds NAIA Men's Division I Basketball Tournament
- Teams: 32
- Finals site: Municipal Auditorium; Kansas City, Missouri
- Champions: Oklahoma City (6th title)
- Runner-up: Mountain State
- Semifinalists: Georgetown (KY); Campbellsville
- Coach of the year: Ray Harper (Oklahoma City)
- Player of the year: Ollie Bailey (Oklahoma City)
- Charles Stevenson Hustle Award: Eric Palm (McKendree)
- Chuck Taylor MVP: Kameron Gray (Oklahoma City)
- Attendance: 34,102
- Top scorer: Othyus Jeffers (Robert Morris (IL)) (86 points)

The 2008 Buffalo Funds - NAIA Division I men's basketball tournament was held from March 19 to 25 at Municipal Auditorium in Kansas City, Missouri. The 71st annual NAIA basketball tournament features 32 teams playing in a single-elimination format.

The official announcement of the 32-team field for the 71st Annual Buffalo Funds-NAIA Division I National Championship occurred late on Tuesday, March 11, with the announcement of the official bracket on Wednesday, March 12 at 5 p.m. CST. Early opening round action between No. 5 Mountain State and Olivet Nazarene went into two long overtimes. This caused a backup in game schedules. The late game featuring Southern Nazarene University and Point Loma Nazarene University was moved back from 10:30pm CST to 11:30pm CST. The late start caused many of the 3,000 fans to leave after halftime. Near the end of the game SNU rallied to tie the SeaLions 67–67 with 14 secs left sending the game into overtime. The game finally ended around 1:30am CST with Point Loma pulling off the upset over SNU. It was the latest finishing NAIA tournament game. Games for the next day started in about 6 hours.

The championship game featured defending champions 7 seed Oklahoma City University and 5 seed Mountain State. Oklahoma City won the game, giving them back to back National Championships in win over Mountain State (75-72). Oklahoma City is the first team since Life University (Ga.) won the '99-'00 titles. Oklahoma City was making its third straight NAIA title game appearance, becoming the first team since Kentucky State University from 1970–72 to so. The Stars were defeated in the 2006 championship game by Texas Wesleyan University, 67–65.

== Awards and honors ==
- Leading scorer: Othyus Jeffers, Robert Morris (IL)
- Leading rebounder: Nestor Colmenares, Campbellsville
- Dr. James Naismith-Emil S. Liston Sportsmanship Award: Campbellsville
- Charles A. Krigel Award: Keith Adkins, Campbellsville
- Chuck Walden Memorial Trophy: Kansas City Life Insurance Company
- Frank Cramer Award: John Kornitzer, Buffalo Funds
- Most consecutive tournament appearances: 17th, Georgetown (KY)
- Most tournament appearances: Georgetown (KY), 27th of 30, appearances to the NAIA Tournament
- Oklahoma City notched its 47th tournament win, moving past Central Washington for sole possession of third place on the all-time list. The Stars trail Georgetown College (Ky.), which has a record 49 wins, and Oklahoma Baptist, which has 48 victories.

== 2008 NAIA bracket ==
First round March 19 and 20	Second round March 21
1	Georgetown (KY)	83
–	Emmanuel (GA)	59
1	Georgetown (KY)	85
16	Trevecca Nazarene	83
–	Mobile	58
16	Trevecca Nazarene	67
TOP TIER; March 19
9	Southern Nazarene	73 (OT)
–	Point Loma Nazarene	76
–	Point Loma Nazarene	64
8	Robert Morris (IL)	80
–	Carroll (MT)	73
8	Robert Morris (IL)	82
5	Mountain State	87
–	Olivet Nazarene(2 OT)	76
5	Mountain State	84
–	Wayland Baptist	71
–	Wayland Baptist	89
12	Martin Methodist	85
TOP TIER; March 19
13	Azusa Pacific	61
–	Columbia (MO)	47
13	Azusa Pacific	83
4	LSU–Shreveport	69
–	USAO	69
4	LSU–Shreveport	71
3	Lambuth	76
–	St. Xavier	68
3	Lambuth	79
–	Oklahoma Baptist	89
–	Oklahoma Baptist	71
14	Auburn–Montgomery	70 (OT)
BOTTOM TIER; March 20
11	McKendree	73
–	Texas Wesleyan	71
11	McKendree	64
–	Campbellsville	80
–	Campbellsville	72
6	Concordia (CA)	63
7	Oklahoma City	81
–	Cumberland	64
7	Oklahoma City	69
10	California Baptist	63
–	Xavier	69
10	California Baptist	77
BOTTOM TIER; March 20
15	Lewis–Clark State	62
–	Cumberlands	75
–	Cumberlands	72
2	Lee	84
–	Langston	67
2	Lee	77

Quarterfinals; March 22
1	Georgetown (KY)	88
8	Robert Morris (IL)	84
5	Mountain State	72
13	Azusa Pacific	51
–	Oklahoma Baptist	69
–	Campbellsville	74
7	Oklahoma City	86
2	Lee	66

Semifinals; March 24
1	Georgetown (KY)	65
5	Mountain State	78
–	Campbellsville	64
7	Oklahoma City	78

NAIA Championship; March 25
5	Mountain State	72
7	Oklahoma City	75

== See also ==
- 2008 NAIA Division I women's basketball tournament
- 2008 NCAA Division I men's basketball tournament
- 2008 NCAA Division II men's basketball tournament
- 2008 NCAA Division III men's basketball tournament
- 2008 NAIA Division II men's basketball tournament
