= 2008 NCAA Division III men's basketball tournament =

American collegiate men's basketball tournament (2008)

- Teams: 59
- Finals site: , Salem, Virginia
- Champions: Washington University in St. Louis (1st title)
- Runner-up: Amherst (2nd title game)
- Semifinalists: Hope (3rd Final Four); Ursinus (2nd Final Four)
- Winning coach: Mark Edwards (WashU)
- MOP: Troy Ruths (WashU)
- Attendance: 86,657

The 2008 NCAA Division III men's basketball tournament was the 34th annual single-elimination tournament to determine the national champions of National Collegiate Athletic Association (NCAA) men's Division III collegiate basketball in the United States.

The field contained sixty-four teams, and each program was allocated to one of four sectionals. All sectional games were played on campus sites, while the national semifinals, third-place final, and championship finals were contested at the Salem Civic Center in Salem, Virginia.

Washington University defeated defending champions Amherst in the championship, 90–68, clinching their first national title.

The Bears (25–6) were coached by Mark Edwards.

Troy Ruths, also from Washington University, was named Most Outstanding Player.

== Bracket ==
=== Top left sectional ===
First round
Capital	92
Bethany (WV)	70
Centre	75
Franklin	61
Heidelberg	62
Ohio Wesleyan	83
UW–Whitewater	70
Loras	71
Lawrence	83
Wheaton (IL)	93*
Occidental	52
Pomona–Pitzer	51

Second round
Hope	92
Capital	72
Centre	65
Ohio Wesleyan	82
Loras	73
Wheaton (IL)	76
Occidental	75
Whitworth	83

Sectional semifinals
Hope	71
Ohio Wesleyan	63
Wheaton (IL)	76
Whitworth	67

Sectional finals
Hope	83
Wheaton (IL)	70

=== Bottom left sectional ===
First round
Augustana (IL)	72
Aurora	61
Wooster	74
WashU	79
St. Thomas (MN)	70
Buena Vista	72
UW–Stevens Point	67
Chicago	53
Guilford	77
St. Mary's (MD)	89
Widener	87
Averett	78
Millsaps	80
Maryville (TN)	72
Mary Hardin–Baylor	65
Fontbonne	62

Second round
Augustana (IL)	67
WashU	70*
Buena Vista	54
UW–Stevens Point	53
St. Mary's (MD)	83
Widener	74
Millsaps	57
Mary Hardin–Baylor	56

Sectional semifinals
WashU	85*
Buena Vista	77
St. Mary's (MD)	73
Millsaps	82

Sectional finals
WashU	57
Millsaps	46

=== Top right sectional ===
First round
Moravian	74
John Jay	80
Richard Stockton	84*
Immaculata	75
Nazareth	73
Rhode Island College	77
Brandeis	80
Lasell	59
Bowdoin	79
Curry	49
King's (PA)	96
Clarkson	66

Second round
Amherst	96
John Jay	74
Richard Stockton	78
Rhode Island College	70
Brandeis	68
Bowdoin	53
King's (PA)	77
Plattsburgh State	83*

Sectional semifinals
Amherst	85
Richard Stockton	77
Brandeis	74
Plattsburgh State	63

Sectional finals
Amherst	65
Brandeis	55

=== Bottom right sectional ===
First round
Ursinus	94
Baptist Bible	76
Virginia Wesleyan	80
WPI	75
Gettysburg	95
Salem State	87
Scranton	53
Elms	71
Rochester	56
Middlebury	43
Farmingdale State	62
Penn State Behrend	83
Trinity (CT)	65
Coast Guard	70

Second round
Ursinus	70
Virginia Wesleyan	64
Gettysburg	66
Elms	65
Rochester	65
Penn State Behrend	56
Coast Guard	50
UMass Dartmouth	47

Sectional semifinals
Ursinus	79
Gettysburg	55
Rochester	48
Coast Guard	57

Sectional finals
Ursinus	82*
Coast Guard	76

== Final Four ==
- Site: Salem Civic Center, Salem, Virginia

National Semifinals
Hope	74
Washington University	89
Amherst	84
Ursinus	58

National Championship
WashU	90
Amherst	68
National Third-place
Hope	100
Ursinus	86

== See also ==
- 2008 NCAA Division I men's basketball tournament
- 2008 NCAA Division II men's basketball tournament
- 2008 NCAA Division III women's basketball tournament
- 2008 NAIA Division I men's basketball tournament
