= 2008 NCAA Division II men's basketball tournament =

- Teams: 64
- Finals site: MassMutual Center, Springfield, Massachusetts
- Champions: Winona State (2nd title)
- Runner-up: Augusta State (1st title game)
- Semifinalists: Alaska Anchorage (1st Final Four); Bentley (1st Final Four)
- Winning coach: Mike Leaf (2nd title)
- MOP: Jonte Flowers (Winona State)

The 2008 NCAA Division II men's basketball tournament was the 52nd annual single-elimination tournament to determine the national champion of men's NCAA Division II college basketball in the United States.

Officially culminating the 2007–08 NCAA Division II men's basketball season, the tournament featured sixty-four teams from around the country.

The Elite Eight, national semifinals, and championship were again played at the MassMutual Center in Springfield, Massachusetts.

Making a third consecutive appearance in the tournament final, Winona State (38–1) defeated Augusta State in, 87–76, to win their second Division II national championship and second in three seasons.

The Warriors were coached by Mike Leaf. Winona State's Jonte Flowers was the Most Outstanding Player.

2008 NCAA Division II Men's sites - regionals (cyan) Elite Eight (red)

== Regionals ==
=== Northeast - Waltham, Massachusetts ===
Location: Dana Center Host: Bentley College

First round Round of 64; March 15
1	Bentley	81
8	Merrimack	68
4	Long Island-C.W. Post	56
5	Bryant	63
3	Saint Rose (4OT)	85
6	Philadelphia	75
2	Assumption (OT)	74
7	Holy Family	66

Regional semifinal Round of 32; March 16
1	Bentley	60
5	Bryant	41
3	Saint Rose	51
2	Assumption	52

Regional final Sweet 16; March 18
1	Bentley	88
2	Assumption	72

=== South - Lakeland, Florida ===
Location: Jenkins Field House Host: Florida Southern College

First round Round of 64; March 15
1	Florida Southern	69
8	Ouachita Baptist	74
4	North Alabama	72
5	Christian Brothers	71
3	Tampa	86
6	Harding	77
2	Benedict	70
7	Eckerd	49

Regional semifinal Round of 32; March 16
4	North Alabama (OT)	99
8	Ouachita Baptist	93
3	Tampa	59
2	Benedict	73

Regional final Sweet 16; March 18
4	North Alabama	97
2	Benedict	75

=== Great Lakes - Allendale, Michigan ===
Location: Fieldhouse Arena Host: Grand Valley State University

First round Round of 64; March 15
1	Grand Valley State	69
8	St. Joseph's (IN)	52
4	Northern Kentucky	61
5	Kentucky Wesleyan	55
3	Drury	56
6	Gannon	73
2	Findlay	64
7	Lewis	57

Regional semifinal Round of 32; March 16
1	Grand Valley State	62
4	Northern Kentucky	58
6	Gannon	82
2	Findlay	88

Regional final Sweet 16; March 18
1	Grand Valley State	75
2	Findlay	58

=== North Central - Winona, Minnesota ===
Location: McCown Gymnasium Host: Winona State University

First round Round of 64; March 15
1	Winona State	78
8	Colorado Christian	45
4	Fort Lewis	76
5	Nebraska-Omaha	82
3	Minnesota State	87
6	Augustana (SD)	95
2	Northern State	70
7	South Dakota	69

Regional semifinal Round of 32; March 16
1	Winona State	80
5	Nebraska-Omaha	67
6	Augustana (SD)	66
2	Northern State	75

Regional final Sweet 16; March 18
1	Winona State	68
2	Northern State	60

=== South Atlantic - Augusta, Georgia ===
Location: Christenberry Fieldhouse Host: Augusta State University

First round Round of 64; March 15
1	South Carolina-Aiken	58
8	Clayton State	60
4	Virginia Union	68
5	Lenoir–Rhyne	76
3	Wingate (OT)	79
6	Catawba	76
2	Augusta State	58
7	Johnson C. Smith	54

Regional semifinal Round of 32; March 16
8	Clayton State (OT)	83
5	Lenoir–Rhyne	69
3	Wingate	65
2	Augusta State	78

Regional final Sweet 16; March 18
8	Clayton State	72
2	Augusta State	89

† South Carolina-Aiken, despite being the #1 seed, was barred from hosting the regional due to NCAA edicts disallowing the hosting of NCAA championships in the states of South Carolina and Mississippi as a result of controversies over continued usage of the Confederate flag.

=== South Central - Stephenville, Texas ===
Location: Wisdom Gymnasium Host: Tarleton State University

First round Round of 64; March 15
1	Tarleton State	70
8	St. Mary's (TX)	64
4	West Texas A&M	79
5	Southwest Baptist	95
3	Central Oklahoma	65
6	Fort Hays State	64
2	Northwest Missouri State	72
7	St. Edward's	48

Regional semifinal Round of 32; March 16
1	Tarleton State	80
5	Southwest Baptist	72
3	Central Oklahoma	73
2	Northwest Missouri State	59

Regional final Sweet 16; March 18
1	Tarleton State	76
3	Central Oklahoma	77

=== East - California, Pennsylvania ===
Location: Hamer Hall Host: California University of Pennsylvania

First round Round of 64; March 15
1	California (PA)	75
8	Queens (NC)	54
4	Alderson Broaddus	81
5	Cheyney	63
3	Edinboro	61
6	Millersville	64
2	Mount Olive	54
7	Pittsburgh-Johnstown	83

Regional semifinal Round of 32; March 16
1	California (PA)	72
4	Alderson Broaddus	67
6	Millersville	81
7	Pittsburgh-Johnstown	73

Regional final Sweet 16; March 18
1	California (PA)	64
6	Millersville	52

=== West - Anchorage, Alaska ===
Location: Wells Fargo Sports Complex Host: University of Alaska at Anchorage

First round Round of 64; March 14
1	Alaska–Anchorage	80
8	UC San Diego	60
4	Central Washington	57
5	Seattle Pacific	58
3	Chaminade	68
6	Humboldt State	60
2	Cal State-San Bernardino	63
7	BYU-Hawaii	67

Regional semifinal Round of 32; March 15
1	Alaska–Anchorage	56
5	Seattle Pacific	55
3	Chaminade	62
7	BYU-Hawaii	83

Regional final Sweet 16; March 17
1	Alaska–Anchorage	73
7	BYU-Hawaii	67

== Elite Eight–Springfield, Massachusetts ==
Location: MassMutual Center Hosts: American International College and Naismith Memorial Basketball Hall of Fame

National Quarterfinals; Elite Eight; March 26
SA	Augusta State	106
SC	Central Oklahoma	104
W	Alaska Anchorage	55
E	California (PA)	52
Springfield, Massachusetts
NE	Bentley	102
S	North Alabama	92
NC	Winona State	67
GL	Grand Valley State	54

National semifinals Final Four; March 27
SA	Augusta State	56
W	Alaska Anchorage	50
NE	Bentley	75
NC	Winona State	86

National championship March 29
SA	Augusta State	76
NC	Winona State	87

== All-tournament team ==
- Jonte Flowers, Winona State (MOP)
- John Smith, Winona State
- Tyrekus Bowman, Augusta State
- Garret Siler, Augusta State
- Lew Finnegan, Bentley

== See also ==
- 2008 NCAA Division I men's basketball tournament
- 2008 NCAA Division III men's basketball tournament
