= 2020 in basketball =

The following are the basketball events of the year 2020 throughout the world.

The following are basketball events that are expected to take place in 2020 throughout the world. Tournaments include international (FIBA), professional (club), and amateur and collegiate levels.

== International tournaments ==
=== National senior team tournaments ===
The IOC postponed basketball at the 2020 Summer Olympics to 2021.

FIBA postponed the following tournaments to 2021:

- 2020 FIBA Men's Olympic Qualifying Tournaments
- 2020 FIBA Women's Olympic Qualifying Tournaments

=== 3X3 championships ===
Tournament	Host	Champion	Runner-up	Result	Playoff format
2020 FIBA 3x3 World Tour Final	(Saudi Arabia) Jeddah	(Latvia) Riga	(Serbia) Liman	(Lithuania) Utena Uniclub	Single-game final

=== Other international championships ===
The following tournaments were postponed to 2021:

- 2020 FIBA European Championship for Small Countries

The following tournaments were cancelled outright:

- 2020 William Jones Cup

=== FIBA youth championships ===
FIBA postponed the following tournaments to 2021:

- 2020 FIBA Under-17 Basketball World Cup
- 2020 FIBA Under-17 Women's Basketball World Cup

FIBA canceled the following tournaments outright:

- 2019 FIBA Under-16 Asian Championship
- 2019 FIBA Under-16 Women's Asian Championship

== Professional club seasons ==
=== FIBA Intercontinental Cup ===
Host	Champion	Runner-up	Result	Playoff format
(Spain) San Cristóbal de La Laguna	(Spain) Iberostar Tenerife	(Italy) Segafredo Virtus Bologna	80–72	One-game playoff

=== Continental seasons ===
==== Men ====
Organizer	Tournament	Champion	Runner-up	Result	Playoff format
Euroleague Basketball	2019–20 EuroLeague	All canceled due to coronavirus pandemic in Europe.			
Euroleague Basketball	2019–20 EuroCup Basketball	All canceled due to coronavirus pandemic in Europe.			
FIBA	2020 FIBA Asia Champions Cup	Cancelled due to coronavirus pandemic in Asia.			
FIBA	2019–20 Basketball Champions League	(Spain) San Pablo Burgos	(Greece) AEK	85–74	Single-game final
FIBA	2019–20 BCLA season	(Argentina) Quimsa	(Brazil) Flamengo	92–86	Single-game final
FIBA	2019–20 FIBA Europe Cup	Canceled due to coronavirus pandemic in Europe.			
NBA/FIBA	2020 BAL season	Canceled due to coronavirus pandemic in Africa.			

==== Women ====
Organizer	Tournament	Champion	Runner-up	Result	Playoff format
FIBA	2019–20 EuroLeague Women	All canceled due to coronavirus pandemic in Europe.			
FIBA	2019–20 EuroCup Women	All canceled due to coronavirus pandemic in Europe.			

=== Regional seasons ===
==== Men ====
Region	League	Champion	Runner-up	Result	Playoff format
Former Yugoslavia	2019–20 ABA League	All canceled due to coronavirus pandemic in Europe.			
Former Yugoslavia	2019–20 ABA 2nd League	All canceled due to coronavirus pandemic in Europe.			
Southeast Asia	2019–20 ABL season	Canceled due to coronavirus pandemic in Asia.			
Alpe-Adria	2019–20 Alpe Adria Cup	(Czech Republic) JIP Pardubice	(Czech Republic) Armex Děčín	185–176	Two-legged playoff
Estonia and Latvia	2019–20 Latvian–Estonian Basketball League	All canceled due to coronavirus pandemic in Europe.			
Balkans	2019–20 BIBL	All canceled due to coronavirus pandemic in Europe.			

==== Women ====
Region	League	Champion	Runner-up	Result	Playoff format
Southeast Europe	2019–20 WABA League	(Montenegro) Budućnost Bemax	(Slovenia) Cinkarna Celje	Final Four canceled due to coronavirus pandemic in Europe; final positions determined via regular season standings.	

=== Domestic league seasons ===
==== Men ====
Nation	Tournament	Champion	Runner-up	Result	Playoff format
Albania	2019–20 Albanian Basketball League				
Albania	2020 Albanian Basketball Cup	Goga Basket	Vllaznia	80–70	Single-game final
Algeria	2019–20 Algerian Basketball Championship				
Angola	2019–20 BAI Basket				
Armenia	2019–20 Armenia Basketball League A				
Argentina	2019–20 La Liga season				
Austria	2019–20 Österreichische Basketball Bundesliga season	Canceled due to coronavirus pandemic in Austria.			
Austria	2019–20 Austrian Basketball Cup	Kapfenberg Bulls	Klosterneuburg Dukes	83–68	Single-game final
Australia (Note: Includes one team from New Zealand.)	2019–20 NBL season	Perth Wildcats	Sydney Kings	2–1	Best-of-5 series
Azerbaijan	2019–20 Azerbaijan Basketball League				
Bahrain	2019–20 Bahraini Premier League				
Belarus	2019–20 Belarusian Premier League				
Belgium	2019–20 Pro Basketball League	Filou Oostende	Belfius Mons-Hainaut	Premature ending	
Belgium	2019–20 Belgian Basketball Cup	Antwerp Giants	Spirou	83–78	Single-game final
Bosnia and Herzegovina	2019–20 Basketball Championship of Bosnia and Herzegovina	Igokea	Široki	Premature ending	
Bosnia and Herzegovina	2019–20 Basketball Cup of Bosnia and Herzegovina	Spars Realway	Igokea	93–85	Single-game final
Brazil	2019–20 NBB season				
Bulgaria	2019–20 National Basketball League	Canceled due to coronavirus pandemic in Bulgaria.			
Bulgaria	2020 Bulgarian Basketball Cup	Levski Lukoil	Balkan Botevgrad	86–78	Single-game final
Canada	2019–20 NBL Canada season	Canceled due to coronavirus pandemic in Canada.			
Chile	2018-19 LNB Chile season	Canceled due to coronavirus pandemic in Chile.			
China	2019–20 Chinese Basketball Association season	Guangdong Southern Tigers	Liaoning Flying Leopards	2–1	Best-of-3 series
Croatia	2019–20 Hrvatski telekom Premijer liga	Canceled due to coronavirus pandemic in Croatia.			
Croatia	2019–20 Krešimir Ćosić Cup	Zadar	Cibona	89–76	Single-game final
Cyprus	2019–20 Cyprus Basketball Division A				
Cyprus	2019–20 Cypriot Basketball Cup				
Czech Republic	2019–20 NBL (Czech Republic)	ERA Nymburk	Opava	Premature ending	
Czech Republic	2019–20 Czech Republic Basketball Cup	ERA Nymburk	USK Praha	100–94	Single-game final
Denmark	2019–20 Basketligaen	Bakken Bears	Randers Cimbria	Premature ending	
Denmark	2019–20 Danish Basketball Cup	Bakken Bears	Horsens	89–80	Single-game final
Egypt	2019–20 Egyptian Super League				
Egypt	2019–20 Egyptian Basketball Cup				
Estonia	2019–20 Estonian Championship	Canceled due to coronavirus pandemic in Estonia.			
Estonia	2020 Estonian Basketball Cup	Kalev/Cramo	Rakvere Tarvas	95–56	Single-game final
Finland	2019–20 Korisliiga season	Canceled due to coronavirus pandemic in Finland.			
Finland	2019–20 Finnish Basketball Cup	Helsinki Seagulls	Tampereen Pyrintö	94–93	Single-game final
France (Note: Includes one team from Monaco.)	2019–20 Pro A season	Canceled due to coronavirus pandemic in France.			
France	2019–20 French Basketball Cup	ASVEL	Le Mans Sarthe	70–61	Single-game final
France	2020 Leaders Cup	SIG	JL Bourg-en-Bresse	98–97	Single-game final
Georgia	2019–20 Georgian Superliga	Canceled due to coronavirus pandemic in Georgia.			
Germany	2019–20 Basketball Bundesliga	Alba Berlin	Riesen Ludwigsburg	163–139	Two-legged format
Germany	2019–20 BBL-Pokal	Alba Berlin	EWE Baskets Oldenburg	89–67	Single-game final
Great Britain	2019–20 BBL	Canceled due to coronavirus pandemic in the United Kingdom.			
Great Britain	2019–20 BBL Cup	Worcester Wolves	Bristol Flyers	67–59	Single-game final
Great Britain	2019–20 BBL Trophy	Newcastle Eagles	Solent Kestrels	96–94	Single-game final
Greece	2019–20 Greek Basket League	Panathinaikos OPAP	AEK	Premature ending (Note: Panathinaikos named champion after the premature ending of the league due to the coronavirus pandemic in Greece)	
Greece	2019–20 Greek Basketball Cup	AEK	Promitheas	61–57	Single-game final
Hungary	2019–20 Nemzeti Bajnokság I/A	Canceled due to coronavirus pandemic in Hungary.			
Hungary	2020 Magyar Kupa				
Iceland	2019–20 Úrvalsdeild karla	Canceled due to coronavirus pandemic in Iceland.			
Iceland	2019–20 Icelandic Basketball Cup	Stjarnan	Grindavík	89–75	Single-game final
Iran	2019–20 Iranian Basketball Super League	Canceled due to coronavirus pandemic in Iran			
Ireland (Note: Basketball on the island of Ireland, including the league system, is organised on an All-Ireland basis. As such, the national league includes one team from Northern Ireland, which is politically part of the United Kingdom.)	2019–20 Irish Super League	Belfast Star	Tralee Warriors	Premature ending	
Ireland	2019–20 Irish National Cup	Templeogue	Éanna	78–68	Single-game final
Israel	2019–20 Israeli Basketball Premier League	Maccabi Tel Aviv	Maccabi Rishon LeZion	86–81	Single-game final
Israel	2019–20 Israeli Basketball State Cup	Hapoel Jerusalem	Ironi Nahariya	92–89	Single-game final
Italy	2019–20 LBA	Canceled due to coronavirus pandemic in Italy.			
Italy	2020 Italian Basketball Cup	Umana Reyer Venezia	Happy Casa Brindisi	73–67	Single-game final
Japan	2019–20 B.League season	Canceled due to coronavirus pandemic in Japan			
Kazakhstan	2019–20 Kazakhstan Basketball Cup				
Kosovo	2019–20 Kosovo Basketball Superleague	Canceled due to coronavirus pandemic in Kosovo.			
Kosovo	2019–20 Kosovo Basketball Cup				
Latvia	2019–20 Latvian Basketball League	Canceled due to coronavirus pandemic in Latvia.			
Lithuania	2019–20 LKL season	Žalgiris	Lietuvos rytas	Premature ending (Note: Žalgiris named champion after the premature ending of the league due to the coronavirus pandemic in Lithuania)	
Lithuania	2020 King Mindaugas Cup				
Luxembourg	2019–20 Total League season	Canceled due to coronavirus pandemic in Luxembourg.			
Malta	2019–20 Division 1				
Mexico	2019–20 LNBP season				
Moldova	2019–20 Moldovan National Division				
Montenegro	2019–20 Prva A liga	Canceled due to coronavirus pandemic in Montenegro.			
Montenegro	2019–20 Montenegrin Basketball Cup	Budućnost VOLI	Mornar	92–83	Single-game final
Netherlands	2019–20 Dutch Basketball League	Canceled due to coronavirus pandemic in the Netherlands.			
Netherlands	2019–20 NBB Cup	Canceled due to coronavirus pandemic in the Netherlands.			
New Zealand	2020 New Zealand NBL season	Otago Nuggets	Manawatu Jets	79–77	Single-game final
North Macedonia	2019–20 Macedonian First League				
North Macedonia	2019–20 Macedonian Basketball Cup				
Norway	2019–20 BLNO season	Canceled due to coronavirus pandemic in Norway.			
Philippines	2019 PBA Governors' Cup	Barangay Ginebra San Miguel	Meralco Bolts	4–1	Best-of-7 series
Philippines	2020 PBA Philippine Cup	Barangay Ginebra San Miguel	TNT Tropang Giga	4–1	Best-of-7 series
Poland	2019–20 PLK season	Stelmet Enea Zielona Góra	TBV Start Lublin	Premature ending	
Poland	2020 Polish Basketball Cup				
Portugal	2019–20 LPB season	Canceled due to coronavirus pandemic in Portugal.			
Portugal	2019–20 Portuguese Basketball Cup				
Romania	2019–20 Liga Națională				
Russia (Note: Includes one team each from Belarus, Estonia, Kazakhstan, and Latvia. The highest-ranked team from Russia is also named as Russian Champions.)	2019–20 VTB United League	Canceled due to coronavirus pandemic in Russia.			
Russia	2019–20 Russian Basketball Cup				
Serbia	2019–20 Basketball League of Serbia	Canceled due to coronavirus pandemic in Serbia.			
Serbia	2019–20 Radivoj Korać Cup	Partizan NIS	Crvena zvezda mts	85–84	Single-game final
Slovakia	2019–20 Slovak Basketball League	Canceled due to coronavirus pandemic in Slovakia.			
Slovakia	2019–20 Slovak Basketball Cup				
Slovenia	2019–20 Slovenian Basketball League	Canceled due to coronavirus pandemic in Slovenia.			
Slovenia	2019–20 Slovenian Basketball Cup	Koper Primorska	Cedevita Olimpija	93–84	Single-game final
South Korea	2019–20 KBL season	Canceled due to coronavirus pandemic in South Korea.			
Spain (Note: Includes one team from Andorra.)	2019–20 ACB season	Baskonia	Barcelona	69–67	Single-game final
Spain	2020 Copa del Rey de Baloncesto	Real Madrid	Unicaja	95–68	Single-game final
Sweden	2019–20 Basketligan season	Borås	Luleå	Premature ending (Note: Borås named champion after the premature ending of the league due to the coronavirus pandemic in Sweden)	
Switzerland	2019–20 SBL	Canceled due to coronavirus pandemic in Switzerland.			
Switzerland	2019–20 SBL Cup				
Taiwan	2019–20 Super Basketball League	Taiwan Beer	Yulon Luxgen Dinos	4–3	Best-of-7 series
Turkey	2019–20 Basketbol Süper Ligi	Canceled due to coronavirus pandemic in Turkey.			
Turkey	2020 Turkish Basketball Cup	Fenerbahçe Beko	Darüşşafaka Tekfen	74–71	Single-game final
Ukraine	2019–20 SuperLeague	Dnipro	Kyiv-Basket	Premature ending	
Ukraine	2019–20 Ukrainian Basketball Cup				
United States (Note: The NBA and the G League each include one team from Canada.)	2019–20 NBA season	Los Angeles Lakers	Miami Heat	4–2	Best-of-7 series
United States	2019–20 NBA G League season	Canceled due to coronavirus pandemic in the United States.			

==== Women ====
Nation	Tournament	Champion	Runner-up	Result	Playoff format
Australia	2019–20 WNBL season	Canberra Capitals	Southside Flyers	2–0	Best-of-three series
France	2019–20 Ligue Féminine de Basketball				
France	2019–20 Women's French Basketball Cup				
Iceland	2019–20 Úrvalsdeild kvenna	Canceled due to coronavirus pandemic in Iceland.			
Iceland	2019–20 Icelandic Basketball Cup	Skallagrímur	KR	66–49	Single-game final
Romania	2019–20 Liga Națională				
Serbia	2019–20 First Women's League	Canceled due to coronavirus pandemic in Serbia.			
Serbia	2019–20 Milan Ciga Vasojević Cup	Kraljevo	Radivoj Korać	76–73	Single-game final
Spain	2019–20 Liga Femenina de Baloncesto	Canceled due to coronavirus pandemic in Spain.			
United States	2020 WNBA season	Seattle Storm	Las Vegas Aces	3–0	Best-of-5 series

== College seasons ==
=== Men's ===
Nation	League / Tournament	Champions	Runners-up	Result	Playoff format
Canada	2020 U Sports Men's Basketball Championship	Carleton Ravens	Dalhousie Tigers	74–65	Single-game final
Philippines	2019 PCCL National Collegiate Championship	Ateneo Blue Eagles	San Beda Red Lions	57–46	Single-game final
United States	NCAA Division I	All cancelled due to coronavirus pandemic in the U.S.			
United States	National Invitation Tournament	All cancelled due to coronavirus pandemic in the U.S.			
United States	NCAA Division II	All cancelled due to coronavirus pandemic in the U.S.			
United States	NCAA Division III	All cancelled due to coronavirus pandemic in the U.S.			
United States	NAIA Division I	All cancelled due to coronavirus pandemic in the U.S.			
United States	NAIA Division II	All cancelled due to coronavirus pandemic in the U.S.			

=== Women's ===
Nation	League / Tournament	Champions	Runners-up	Result	Playoff format
Canada	2020 U Sports Women's Basketball Championship	Saskatchewan Huskies	Brock Badgers	82–61	Single-game final
Philippines	UAAP Season 83	Cancelled due to coronavirus disease in the Philippines			
United States	NCAA Division I	All cancelled due to coronavirus pandemic in the U.S.			
United States	Women's National Invitation Tournament	All cancelled due to coronavirus pandemic in the U.S.			
United States	NCAA Division II	All cancelled due to coronavirus pandemic in the U.S.			
United States	NCAA Division III	All cancelled due to coronavirus pandemic in the U.S.			
United States	NAIA Division I	All cancelled due to coronavirus pandemic in the U.S.			
United States	NAIA Division II	All cancelled due to coronavirus pandemic in the U.S.			

== Deaths ==
- January 1—Roland Minson, 90, All-American college player (BYU).
- January 1—David Stern, 77, American NBA commissioner (1984–2014).
- January 2—Gale McArthur, 90, All-American college player (Oklahoma State).
- January 4—James Ratiff, 61, American college player (Howard).
- January 6—Ivan Salaj, 58, Serbian player (Crvena zvezda).
- January 12—Dick Schnittker, 91, American two-time NBA champion (Minneapolis Lakers) and college All-American (Ohio State).
- January 14—Carl McNulty, 89, American NBA player (Milwaukee Hawks).
- January 15—Milovan Stepandić, 65, Serbian coach (OKK Šabac, KK Borac Čačak, KK Metalac Valjevo).
- January 16—Gene Schwinger, 87, All-American college player (Rice).
- January 17—Leo Byrd, 82, All-American college player (Marshall) and gold medal winner at the 1959 Pan American Games.
- January 21—Morgan Wootten, 88, American Hall of Fame high school coach (DeMatha).
- January 23—Robert Archibald, 39, Scottish NBA player (Memphis Grizzlies, Phoenix Suns, Orlando Magic, Toronto Raptors).
- January 23—Kalevi Tuominen, 92, Finnish player (Tampereen Pyrintö) and coach (Finland national team).
- January 26—Kobe Bryant, 41, American NBA player (Los Angeles Lakers), five-time NBA champion, two-time Olympic gold medalist (2008, 2012).
- January 29—Blagoja Georgievski, 69, Macedonian player (Rabotnički), Olympic silver medalist (1976).
- January 30—Terry Fair, American player (Georgia Bulldogs, Hapoel Tel Aviv, Maccabi Tel Aviv).
- February 2—Peter Aluma, 46, Nigerian NBA player (Sacramento Kings).
- February 2—Ryszard Olszewski, 87, Polish Olympic player (1960).
- February 5—Bill Oates, 80, American college coach (Saint Mary's, Menlo, The Master's).
- February 6—Dick Atha, 88, American NBA player (New York Knicks, Detroit Pistons).
- February 8—Maurice Girardot, 98, French Olympic silver medalist (1948).
- February 8—Bill Robinson, 71, Canadian Olympic player (1976).
- February 9—Don Coleman, 87, American high school coach.
- February 16—Henry Akin, 75, American NBA and ABA player (New York Knicks, Seattle SuperSonics, Kentucky Colonels).
- February 16—Ed Murphy, 78, American college coach (Ole Miss, West Georgia).
- February 26—Carl Slone, 83, American college coach (George Washington, Richmond)
- March—Jeff Taylor, 60, American NBA player (Houston Rockets, Detroit Pistons).
- March 5—Levan Moseshvili, 79, Georgian player, Olympic silver medalist (1964).
- March 12—Juha Harjula, 77 Finnish Olympic player (1964).
- March 18—John Erickson, 92, American college coach (Lake Forest, Wisconsin) and NBA general manager (Milwaukee Bucks).
- March 20—Borislav Stanković, 94, Hall of Fame Serbian player and coach, Secretary General of FIBA.
- March 21—Leroy Wright, 82, American ABA player (Pittsburgh Pipers).
- March 22—Gene Brown, 84, All-American college player and two-time national champion (San Francisco).
- March 22—Jack Krumpe, 84, American NBA executive (New York Knicks).
- March 24—David Edwards, 48, American player (Texas A&M, BC Šilutė, KR).
- March 25—Aric del Rosario, 80, Filipino coach (UST Growling Tigers, Pampanga Dragons, Perpetual Altas).
- March 26—Curly Neal, 77, American player (Harlem Globetrotters).
- March 26—Mekia Valentine, 32, American player.
- March 27—Les Hunter, 77, American NBA and ABA player, college national champion at Loyola (1963).
- April 2—Carl Tacy, 87, American college coach (Marshall, Wake Forest).
- April 7—Harv Schmidt, 83, American college player and coach (Illinois).
- April 12—Sascha Hupmann, 49, German player (Evansville, Alba Berlin, Panathinaikos).
- April 12—Rubén Menini, 96, Argentine Olympic player (1948, 1952).
- April 13—Charlie Harrison, 70, American college coach (New Mexico, East Carolina).
- April 15—Alfonso Marquez, 82, Filipino Olympic player (1960, 1968).
- April 22—Dan Mazzulla, 61, American high school coach.
- April 23—Chris Marcus, 40, American college player (Western Kentucky).
- April 26—Abolfazl Salabi, 95, Iranian Olympic player (1948).
- April 27—Mark McNamara, 60, American NBA player (Philadelphia 76ers, Kansas City Kings, San Antonio Spurs, Los Angeles Lakers, Orlando Magic).
- April 29—Gerson Victalino, 60, Brazilian Olympic player (1984, 1988, 1992).
- May 1—Lajos Engler, 91, Serbian player (KK Proleter Zrenjanin, KK Partizan)
- May 1—Reuben Perach, 87, Israeli Olympic player (1952).
- May 2—Maret-Mai Otsa, 89, Estonian player, FIBA World champion (1959).
- May 3—Rick Roberson, 72, American NBA player (Los Angeles Lakers, Cleveland Cavaliers, Portland Trail Blazers, New Orleans Jazz, Kansas City Kings).
- May 4—Marvin Hershkowitz, 89, American player.
- May 4—Álvaro Teherán, 54, Colombian player (Baloncesto Málaga, Fort Wayne Fury, KK Olimpija).
- May 5—Sonny Cox, 82, American high school coach (King College Prep).
- May 5—Connie Rea, 89, American NBA player (Baltimore Bullets).
- May 7—Mike Storen, 84, American professional league commissioner (ABA, CBA, GBA) and ABA/NBA executive (Indiana Pacers, Kentucky Colonels, Atlanta Hawks).
- May 9—Johnny McCarthy, 86, American NBA player (Cincinnati Royals, St. Louis Hawks, Boston Celtics) and coach (Buffalo Braves, Canisius).
- May 14—Jim Tucker, 87, American NBA player (Syracuse Nationals) and college All-American (Duquesne).
- May 16—Tony Yates, 82, American college All-American player and coach (Cincinnati), two-time NCAA champion (1961, 1962).
- May 19—Ken Burmeister, 72, American college coach (UTSA, Loyola, Incarnate Word).
- May 22—Jerry Sloan, 78, American NBA player (Baltimore Bullets, Chicago Bulls) and Hall of Fame coach (Chicago Bulls, Utah Jazz).
- May 23—Eddie Sutton, 84, American Hall of Fame college basketball coach (Creighton, Arkansas, Kentucky, Oklahoma State).
- June 1—Daniel Levy, 89, Israeli Olympic player (1952).
- June 2—Wes Unseld, 74, American Hall of Fame NBA player, coach and executive (Baltimore/Capital/Washington Bullets) and college All-American (Louisville).
- June 3—Marc de Hond, 42, Dutch wheelchair basketball player.
- June 9—Noel Johnson, 47, American college coach (Midwestern State).
- June 10—Harry Glickman, 96, American NBA executive and co-founder of the Portland Trail Blazers.
- June 11—Earnie Killum, 72, American NBA player (Los Angeles Lakers).
- June 11—Cy Strulovitch, 94, Canadian Olympic player (1948).
- June 13—Dick Garmaker, 87, American NBA player (Minneapolis Lakers, New York Knicks) and college All-American (Minnesota).
- June 13—Nic Jorge, 78, Filipino coach and administrator.
- June 23—Justin Love, 41, American player (BK Ventspils, Beijing Olympians, BC Odesa).
- June 25—Juan Ostoic, 89, Chilean Olympic player (1952, 1956).
- July 3—Charlie Slack, 89, American college player (Marshall).
- July 3—Bill Stricker, 72, American NBA player (Portland Trail Blazers).
- July 6—Zdzisław Myrda, 69, Polish Olympic player (1980).
- July 10—Panagiotis Manias, 87, Greek player (Panellinios).
- July 10—Ed Wild, 85, Canadian Olympic player (1956).
- July 14—Bea Gorton, 73, American college coach (Indiana).
- July 14—Juan Uder, 93, Argentine Olympic player (1948, 1952).
- July 16—Vladimir Obuchov, 84, Soviet/Russian coach (Soviet national team).
- July 18—Lenzie Howell, 52, American player (Arkansas, Tofaş, Cholet).
- July 21—Stanley Robinson, 32, American player (UConn, Iowa Energy, Moncton Miracles).
- July 22—Paul Van Roy, 88, Belgian player.
- July 25—Lou Henson, 88, American college coach (Hardin-Simmons, New Mexico State, Illinois).
- July 29—Kittie Blakemore, 91, American college coach (West Virginia).
- July 29—Bob McCurdy, 68, All-American college player (Richmond).
- July 31—Mike Gale, 70, American ABA (Kentucky Colonels, New York Nets) and NBA (San Antonio Spurs, Portland Trail Blazers, Golden State Warriors) player.
- August 1—Harley Redin, 100, American Hall of Fame college coach (Wayland Baptist).
- August 4—Andre Spencer, 56, American NBA (Atlanta Hawks, Golden State Warriors, Sacramento Kings) and Israeli League (Maccabi Rishon LeZion, Ironi Ramat Gan) player.
- August 5—Stefan Majer, 90, Polish player (Legia Warszawa).
- August 7—Michael Ojo, 27, Nigerian-American player (FMP, Crvena zvezda).
- August 17—Boyd Grant, 87, American college coach (College of Southern Idaho, Fresno State, Colorado State).
- August 18—Bob Bigelow, 66, American NBA player (Kansas City Kings, Boston Celtics, San Diego Clippers).
- August 23—Luigi Serafini, 69, Italian Olympic player (1972, 1976).
- August 27—Lute Olsen, 85, American Hall of Fame college coach (Long Beach State, Iowa, Arizona).
- August 29—Clifford Robinson, 53, American NBA player (Portland Trail Blazers, Phoenix Suns, Golden State Warriors).
- August 30—John Thompson, 78, American NBA player (Boston Celtics) and Hall of Fame college coach (Georgetown).
- September 2—Dave Zeller, 81, American NBA player (Cincinnati Royals).
- September 5—Dwight Anderson, 59, American NBA player (Denver Nuggets).
- September 5—Orlando Bauzon, 75, Filipino Olympic player (1968).
- September 5—Smokey Gaines, 80, American player (Kentucky Colonels, Harlem Globetrotters) and college coach (Detroit, San Diego State).
- September 6—Tom Jernstedt, 75, American Hall of Fame administrator (NCAA, USA Basketball).
- September 11—Sonny Allen, 84, American college (Old Dominion, SMU, Nevada) and WNBA coach (Sacramento Monarchs).
- September 17—Joe Ruklick, 82, American NBA player (Philadelphia Warriors) and college All-American (Northwestern).
- September 18—Don Feeley, 82, American college coach (Sacred Heart, Fairleigh Dickinson).
- September 19—Dick Nemelka, 76, American ABA player (Utah Stars) and college All-American (BYU).
- September 20—Garland F. Pinholster, 92, American college (Oglethorpe) and USA national team (1963 Pan American Games) coach.
- September 21—Amos Lin, 87, Israeli Olympic player (1952).
- September 25—Jerry Oliver, 89, American coach (George Washington, Indiana, Indiana Pacers).
- October 14—Armando Herrera, 89, Mexican Olympic player (1960, 1964).
- October 15—Warren Mitchell, 87, American college coach (William & Mary).
- October 18—Tomás Herrera Martínez, 69, Cuban Olympic bronze medalist (1972).
- October 21—Jesse Arnelle, 86, American NBA player (Fort Wayne Pistons).
- October 26—Jim Iverson, 90, American college player (Kansas State) and coach (South Dakota State). National college division champion (1963).
- October 26—Eddie Johnson, 65, American NBA player (Atlanta Hawks, Cleveland Cavaliers, Seattle SuperSonics).
- October 27—Bob Lochmueller, 93, American NBA player (Syracuse Nationals) and high school coach.
- October 30—Žarko Knežević, 73, Montenegrin basketball player (OKK Beograd, Fenerbahçe, Yugoslavia national team).
- October 30—Nélson Lisboa, 90, Brazilian Olympic player (1956).
- November 1—Yalçın Granit, Turkish Olympic player (1952).
- November 1—Billy Tubbs, 85, American college coach (Lamar, Oklahoma, TCU).
- November 2—Nancy Darsch, 68, American college (Ohio State) and WNBA (New York Liberty, Washington Mystics) coach.
- November 4—Shakey Rodriguez, 67, American high school and college (FIU) coach.
- November 8—Chuck Mrazovich, 96, American NBA player (Indianapolis Olympians).
- November 9—Tom Heinsohn, 86, Hall of Fame American NBA player and coach (Boston Celtics), 8-time NBA champion.
- November 11—Mileta Lisica, 54, Serbian-Slovene basketball player (Sloboda Tuzla, Crvena zvezda, Pivovarna Laško, Novi Sad).
- November 13—Terry Duerod, 64, American NBA player (Detroit Pistons, Dallas Mavericks, Boston Celtics, Golden State Warriors).
- November 14—Norman Taylor, 55, American player (Illawarra Hawks).
- November 15—Anthony Stewart, 50, American college coach (UT Martin).
- November 17—Walt Davis, 89, American NBA player (Philadelphia Warriors, St. Louis Hawks).
- November 18—George Carter, 76, American NBA (Detroit Pistons) and ABA (Virginia Squires, Pittsburgh Condors, New York Nets) player.
- November 22—Paul Covington, 86, American college coach (Jackson State).
- November 22—Billy Evans, 88, American player, Olympic gold medalist (1956).
- November 23—John Oldham, 97, American NBA player (Fort Wayne Pistons) and college coach (Tennessee Tech, Western Kentucky).
- November 24—Rose Marie Battaglia, 91, American Hall of Fame high school and college (Bergen Community College, Iona) basketball coach.
- November 29—Jack Foley, 81, American NBA player (Boston Celtics, New York Knicks) and college All-American (Holy Cross).
- December 1—Kelvin Scarborough, 56, American player.
- December 1—Sol Tolchinsky, 91, Canadian Olympic player (1948).
- December 8—Goo Kennedy, 71, American NBA and ABA player (San Antonio Spurs, Spirits of St. Louis, Utah Stars, Houston Rockets).
- December 10—Nemanja Miljković, 30, Serbian player.
- December 11—Jim Burns, 75, American NBA (Chicago Bulls) and ABA (Dallas Chaparrals) player.
- December 12—Bird Averitt, 68, American NBA (Buffalo Braves, New Jersey Nets) and ABA (San Antonio Spurs, Kentucky Colonels) player.
- December 13—Jimmy Collins, 74, American NBA player (Chicago Bulls) and college coach (UIC).
- December 15—Bruce Seals, 67, American ABA (Utah Stars) and NBA (Seattle SuperSonics) player.
- December 17—Tom Hanneman, 68, American NBA television announcer (Minnesota Timberwolves).
- December 18—Pete Cassidy, 86, American college coach (Cal State Northridge).
- December 19—Marjan Lazovski, 58, Macedonian coach (MZT Skopje, Macedonian National team).
- December 23—Ron Widby, 75, American ABA player (New Orleans Buccaneers).
- December 25—Rich Herrin, 87, American college coach (Southern Illinois).
- December 25—K. C. Jones, 88, American Hall of Fame player and coach (Boston Celtics), 8-time NBA champion (1959–1966), Olympic gold medalist (1956), two-time NCAA champion (1955, 1956).
- December 28—Cy McClairen, 89, American college coach (Bethune–Cookman).
- December 29—James Hardy, 64, American NBA player (Utah Jazz).
- December 30—Bob Bessoir, 88, American college coach (Scranton).

== See also ==
- Timeline of women's basketball
