= 2021 in basketball =

The following are the basketball events of the year 2021 throughout the world.

The following are basketball events that are expected to take place in 2021 throughout the world. Tournaments include international (FIBA), professional (club), and amateur and collegiate levels.

== International tournaments ==
=== 3X3 championships ===
- September 10 – 12: 2021 FIBA 3x3 Europe Cup in (France) Paris
- November 12–14: 2021 FIBA 3x3 AmeriCup in (United States) Miami, Florida

=== FIBA youth championships ===
- 3-11 July: 2021 FIBA Under-19 Basketball World Cup
- 7-15 August: 2021 FIBA Under-19 Women's Basketball World Cup

== Professional club seasons ==
=== FIBA Intercontinental Cup ===
Champion	Runner-up	Result	Playoff format
(Spain) Hereda San Pablo Burgos	(Argentina) Quimsa	82–73	One-game playoff

=== Continental seasons ===
==== Men ====
Organizer	Tournament	Champion	Runner-up	Result	Playoff format
Euroleague Basketball	2020–21 EuroLeague	(Turkey) Anadolu Efes	86–81	(Spain) Barcelona	Single-game final
Euroleague Basketball	2020–21 EuroCup Basketball	(France) Monaco (Note: Monaco is based and plays its home games in that country, but plays in the French basketball league system.)	175–170	(Russia) UNICS	Two-legged final
FIBA	2021 FIBA Asia Champions Cup				
FIBA	2020–21 Basketball Champions League	(Spain) San Pablo Burgos	64–59	(Turkey) Karşıyaka Basket	Single-game final
FIBA	2020–21 BCLA season	(Brazil) Flamengo	84–80	(Nicaragua) Real Estelí	Single-game final
FIBA	2020–21 FIBA Europe Cup	(Israel) Ironi Nes Ziona	82–74	(Poland) Arged BMSLAM Stal	Single-game final
NBA/FIBA	2021 BAL season	(Egypt) Zamalek	76–63	(Tunisia) Monastir	Single-game final

==== Women ====
Organizer	Tournament	Champion	Runner-up	Result	Playoff format
FIBA	2020–21 EuroLeague Women	(Russia) UMMC Ekaterinburg	(Spain) Perfumerías Avenida	78–68	Single-game final
FIBA	2020–21 EuroCup Women	(Spain) Valencia	(Italy) Reyer Venezia	82–81	Single-game final

=== Regional seasons ===
==== Men ====
Region	League	Champion	Runner-up	Result	Playoff format
Adriatic	2020–21 ABA League	(Serbia) Crvena zvezda	(Montenegro) Budućnost	3–2	Best-of-5 series
Adriatic	2020–21 ABA 2nd League	(Montenegro) Studentski centar	(Bosnia and Herzegovina) Spars	170–161	Two-legged final
Alpe-Adria	2020–21 Alpe Adria Cup				
Albania and Kosovo	2020–21 Liga Unike	(Kosovo) KB Ylli	(Kosovo) KB Peja	82–79	Single-game final
Estonia and Latvia	2020–21 Latvian–Estonian Basketball League	(Estonia) BC Kalev	(Latvia) VEF Rīga	86–75	Single-game final
Balkans	2020–21 BIBL	(Israel) Hapoel Holon	(Bulgaria) Academic Plovdiv	91–75	Single-game final
East Europe	2020–21 VTB United League	(Russia) CSKA Moscow	(Russia) UNICS	3–0	Best-of-5 series

==== Women ====
Region	League	Champion	Runner-up	Result	Playoff format
Southeast Europe	2020–21 WABA League	(Bulgaria) Beroe	(Montenegro) Budućnost Bemax	66–56	Single-game final

== Domestic league seasons ==
=== Men ===
==== Europe ====
Nation	Tournament	Champion	Runner-up	Result	Playoff format
Albania	2020–21 Albanian Basketball League	Teuta	Goga Basket	3–1	Best-of-5 series
Albania	2021 Albanian Basketball Cup	Teuta	Goga Basket	90–84	Single-game final
Armenia	2020–21 Armenia Basketball League A	Vahakni City	BC Dvin	4–1	Best-of-7 series
Austria	2020–21 Austrian Basketball Superliga	Swans Gmunden	Kapfenberg Bulls	3–1	Best-of-5 series
Austria	2020–21 Basketball Zweite Liga	Güssing/Jennersdorf Blackbirds	Lopoca Panthers Fürstenfeld	2–0	Best-of-3 series
Austria	2020–21 Austrian Basketball Cup	Oberwart Gunners	Swans Gmunden	84–74	Single-game final
Azerbaijan	2021 Azerbaijan Basketball League	Season cancelled			
Belarus	2020–21 Belarusian Premier League	Tsmoki-Minsk	Borisfen Mogilev	3–1	Best-of-5 series
Belgium	2020–21 Pro Basketball League	Filou Oostende	Belfius Mons-Hainaut	3–1	Best-of-5 series
Belgium	2020–21 Belgian Basketball Cup	Filou Oostende	Kangoeroes Mechelen	65–64	Single-game final
Bosnia and Herzegovina	2020–21 Basketball Championship of Bosnia and Herzegovina	Široki	By decision of BFBIH		
Bosnia and Herzegovina	2020–21 A1 League	Bošnjak	Živinice	2–0	Best-of-3 series
Bosnia and Herzegovina	2020–21 Herzeg-Bosnia Basketball League	Posušje	Grude	2–1	Best-of-3 series
Bosnia and Herzegovina	2020–21 First League of Republika Srpska	Radnik	Drina Princip	3–2	Best-of-5 series
Bosnia and Herzegovina	2020–21 Mirza Delibašić Cup	Igokea	Spars	77–55	Single-game final
Bulgaria	2020–21 National Basketball League	Levski Sofia	Rilski Sportist	4–1	Best-of-7 series
Bulgaria	2021 Bulgarian Basketball Cup	Rilski Sportist	Levski Sofia	87–69	Single-game final
Croatia	2020–21 Hrvatski telekom Premijer liga	Zadar	Split	3–2	Best-of-5 series
Croatia	2020–21 Krešimir Ćosić Cup	Zadar	Split	79–70	Single-game final
Cyprus	2020–21 Cyprus Basketball Division A	AEK Larnaca	Keravnos	3–2	Best-of-5 series
Cyprus	2020–21 Cyprus Basketball Division B	Petrolina A.E.K.	Lighting of Strovolos	3–2	Best-of-5 series
Cyprus	2020–21 Cypriot Basketball Cup	AEK Larnaca	Keravnos	77–59	Single-game final
Czech Republic	2020–21 NBL (Czech Republic)	Nymburk	Opava	2–0	Best-of-3 series
Czech Republic	2020–21 Czech Republic Basketball Cup	Nymburk	Kolín	96–71	Single-game final
Denmark	2020–21 Basketligaen	Bakken Bears	Horsens	4–1	Best-of-7 series
Denmark	2020–21 Danish Basketball Cup	Bakken Bears	Horsens IC	82–80	Single-game final
England	2020–21 National Basketball League season	Solent Kestrels	Hemel Storm	93–62	Single-game final
Estonia	2020–21 Estonian Championship	Kalev/Cramo	Pärnu Sadam	3–1	Best-of-5 series
Estonia	2021 Estonian Basketball Cup	Tartu Ülikool	Kalev/Cramo	82–73	Single-game final
Finland	2020–21 Korisliiga season	Salon Vilpas	Kauhajoki Karhu	3–2	Best-of-5 series
Finland	2020–21 Finnish Basketball Cup	Helsinki Seagulls	Tampereen Pyrintö	97–95	Single-game final
France (Note: The top level includes one team from Monaco.)	2020–21 Pro A season	ASVEL	JDA Dijon	87–74	Single-game final
France	2020–21 Pro B season	Fos	Paris	League standings	
France	2020–21 French Basketball Cup	ASVEL	JDA Dijon	77–61	Single-game final
Georgia	2020–21 Georgian Superliga	Rustavi	Tskhum-Apkhazeti	94–88	Single-game final
Germany	2020–21 Basketball Bundesliga	Alba Berlin	Bayern Munich	3–1	Best-of-5 series
Germany	2020–21 Basketball Bundesliga ProA	Rostock Seawolves	USC Heidelberg	League standings	
Germany	2020–21 BBL-Pokal	Bayern Munich	Alba Berlin	85–79	Single-game final
Great Britain	2020–21 BBL	Newcastle Eagles	London Lions	68–66	Single-game final
Great Britain	2020–21 BBL Cup	Newcastle Eagles	London Lions	84–77	Single-game final
Great Britain	2020–21 BBL Trophy	London Lions	Plymouth Raiders	88–82	Single-game final
Greece	2020–21 Greek Basket League	Panathinaikos	Lavrio	3–1	Best-of-5 series
Greece	2020–21 Greek A2 Basket League	Olympiacos B	Maroussi	93–87	Single-game final
Greece	2020–21 Greek Basketball Cup	Panathinaikos	Promitheas	91–79	Single-game final
Greece	2021 Greek Basketball Super Cup				
Hungary	2020–21 Nemzeti Bajnokság I/A	Falco-Vulcano	Szolnoki Olaj	3–2	Best-of-5 series
Hungary	2021 Magyar Kupa	Falco-Vulcano	DEAC	67–64	Single-game final
Iceland	2020–21 Úrvalsdeild karla	Þór Þorlákshöfn	Keflavík	3–1	Best-of-5 series
Iceland	2020–21 1. deild karla	Breiðablik	League standings		
Iceland	2020–21 Icelandic Basketball Cup	Njarðvík	Stjarnan	97–93	Single-game final
Ireland	2020–21 Irish Super League season				
Ireland	2021 Pat Duffy Mens National Cup				
Ireland	2021 Presidents National Cup				
Israel	2020–21 Israeli Basketball Premier League	Maccabi Tel Aviv	Hapoel Gilboa Galil	2–1	Best-of-3 series
Israel	2020–21 Liga Leumit	Hapoel Galil Elyon	Elitzur Netanya	92–80	Single-game final
Israel	2020–21 Israeli Basketball State Cup	Maccabi Tel Aviv	Maccabi Rishon LeZion	86–69	Single-game final
Israel	2021 Israeli Basketball League Cup	Maccabi Tel Aviv	Hapoel Eilat	92–62	Single-game final
Italy	2020–21 LBA	Segafredo Virtus Bologna	AX Armani Exchange Milano	4–0	Best-of-7 series
Italy	2021 Italian Basketball Cup	Olimpia Milano	Carpegna Prosciutto Pesaro	87–59	Single-game final
Italy	2021 Italian Basketball Supercup				
Kosovo	2020–21 Kosovo Basketball Superleague	KB Ylli	KB Peja	3–0	Best-of-5 series
Lithuania	2020–21 LKL season	Žalgiris	Rytas	3–1	Best-of-5 series
Lithuania	2020–21 National Basketball League	Jonava	Telšiai	100–66	Single-game final
Lithuania	2021 King Mindaugas Cup	Žalgiris	Lietkabelis	76–69	Single-game final
Luxembourg	2020–21 Total League season				
Moldova	2020–21 Moldovan National Division				
Montenegro	2020–21 Prva A liga	Budućnost VOLI	Mornar	3–0	Best-of-5 series
Montenegro	2020–21 Montenegrin Basketball Cup	Budućnost	Mornar Bar	102–93	Single-game final
Netherlands	2020–21 Dutch Basketball League	Leiden	Heroes Den Bosch	3–0	Best-of-5 series
Netherlands	2021 DBL Cup	BAL	Yoast United	98–88	Single-game final
Netherlands	2021 Dutch Basketball Supercup	ZZ Leiden	BAL	87–74	Single-game final
North Macedonia	2020–21 Macedonian First League	MZT Skopje	EuroNickel 2005	83–81	Single-game final
North Macedonia	2020–21 Macedonian Basketball Cup	MZT Skopje	Rabotnički	77–69	Single-game final
Norway	2020–21 BLNO season	Season cancelled			
Poland	2020–21 PLK season	Stal Ostrów Wielkopolski	Śląsk Wrocław	4–2	Best-of-7 series
Poland	2020–21 I Liga	Czarni Słupsk	Górnik Wałbrzych	3–2	Best-of-5 series
Poland	2021 Polish Basketball Cup	Basket Zielona Góra	Spójnia Stargard	86–73	Single-game final
Poland	2021 Polish Basketball Supercup				
Portugal	2020–21 LPB season	Sporting CP	Porto	3–2	Best-of-5 series
Portugal	2020–21 Proliga	Povoa	Illiabum Clube	65–59	Single-game final
Portugal	2020–21 Portuguese Basketball Cup	Sporting CP	Imortal/Algarexperienc	83–59	Single-game final
Portugal	2020–21 Portuguese Basketball League Cup	Porto	Sporting CP	72–68	Single-game final
Portugal	2021 Portuguese Basketball Super Cup				
Romania	2020–21 Liga Națională	U-BT Cluj-Napoca	CSM U Oradea	3–2	Best-of-5 series
Romania	2021 Romanian Basketball Cup	Voluntari	Oradea	72–65	Single-game final
Russia (Note: Russia's top-level competition is the multinational VTB United League, which also includes teams from Belarus, Estonia, Kazakhstan, and Latvia. The official Russian champion is the highest-ranked team from Russia in the VTB United League.)	2020–21 Russian Basketball Super League 1	Samara	Ural Yekaterinburg	86–73	Single-game final
Russia	2020–21 Russian Basketball Cup	Temp-SUMZ-UGMK Revda	Vostok 65	80–71	Single-game final
Scotland	2020–21 Scottish Basketball Championship Men season				
Scotland	2020–21 Scottish Cup				
Serbia	2020–21 Basketball League of Serbia	Crvena zvezda mts	Mega Soccerbet	2–1	Best-of-3 series
Serbia	2020–21 Second Basketball League of Serbia	Zdravlje	Slodes	League standings	
Serbia	2020–21 Radivoj Korać Cup	Crvena zvezda mts	Mega Soccerbet	73–60	Single-game final
Serbia	2020–21 Basketball Cup of Serbia	Vojvodina	Radnički Kragujevac	103–72	Single-game final
Slovakia	2020–21 Slovak Basketball League	Spišská Nová Ves	Patrioti Levine	3–1	Best-of-5 series
Slovakia	2020–21 Slovak Basketball Cup	Spišská Nová Ves	Inter Bratislava	95–66	Single-game final
Slovenia	2020–21 Slovenian Basketball League	Cedevita Olimpija	Krka	3–0	Best-of-5 series
Slovenia	2020–21 Slovenian Basketball Cup	Krka	Šentjur	72–66	Single-game final
Slovenia	2021 Slovenian Basketball Supercup	Cedevita Olimpija	Krka	78–67	Single-game final
Spain (Note: The top level includes one team from Andorra.)	2020–21 ACB season	Barça	Real Madrid	2–0	Best-of-3 series
Spain	2021 Copa del Rey de Baloncesto	Barça	Real Madrid	88–73	Single-game final
Spain	2021 Supercopa de España de Baloncesto				
Sweden	2020–21 Basketligan season	Norrköping Dolphins	Södertälje Kings	4–0	Best-of-7 series
Sweden	2020–21 Superettan	Season cancelled			
Switzerland	2020–21 SBL	Fribourg Olympic	Starwings Basel	3–0	Best-of-5 series
Switzerland	2020–21 SBL Cup	Lions de Genève	SAM Basket	78–60	Single-game final
Turkey	2020–21 Basketbol Süper Ligi	Anadolu Efes	Fenerbahçe	3–0	Best-of-5 series
Turkey	2021 Turkish Basketball Cup	Season cancelled			
Ukraine	2020–21 SuperLeague	Prometey	Zaporizhya	2–1	Best-of-3 series
Ukraine	2020–21 Ukrainian Basketball Cup	Budivelnyk	Cherkaski Mavpy	93–70	Single-game final

==== Asia ====
Nation	Tournament	Champion	Runner-up	Result	Playoff format
Bahrain	2020–21 Bahraini Premier League	Al Ahli	Al Manama	2–0	Best-of-3 series
China	2020–21 Chinese Basketball Association season	Guangdong Southern Tigers	Liaoning Flying Leopards	2–1	Best-of-3 series
China	2021 National Basketball League	Anhui Wenyi Oriental Dragons	Guangxi Weizhuang Rhinos	2–0	Best-of-3 series
Hong Kong	2021 Hong Kong A1 Division Championship				
India	2021 UBA Pro Basketball League				
Indonesia	2021 Indonesian Basketball League	Satria Muda Pertamina	Pelita Jaya Basketball Club	2–1	Best-of-3 series
Iran	2020–21 Iranian Basketball Super League	Shahrdari Gorgan	Mahram Tehran	3–1	Best-of-5 series
Japan	2020–21 B.League season	Chiba Jets Funabashi	Utsunomiya Brex	2–0	Best-of-3 series
Japan	B2 League	Gunma Crane Thunders	Ibaraki Robots	3–0	Best-of-5 series
Japan	B3 League	Aisin AW Areions Anjo	League Standings		
Jordan	2020–21 Jordanian Premier Basketball League	Al Ahli	Al Wehdat	3–0	Best-of-5 series
Kazakhstan	2020–21 Kazakhstan Basketball Championship	Astana	Atyrau	2–0	Best-of-3 series
Lebanon	2020–21 Lebanese Basketball League	Al Riyadi Club Beirut	Champville	4–0	Best-of-7 series
Malaysia	2021 Malaysia Pro League				
Philippines	2021 PBA Philippine Cup	TNT Tropang Giga	Magnolia Hotshots	4–1	Best-of-7 series
Qatar	2020–21 Qatari Basketball League	Al-Gharafa	Al Shamal	89–71	Single-game final
Singapore	2021 National Basketball League				
South Korea	2020–21 KBL season	Anyang KGC	Jeonju KCC Egis	4–0	Best-of-7 series
Syria	2021 Syrian Basketball League	Al-Karamah	Al-Wahda	74–51	Single-game final
Taiwan	2020–21 Super Basketball League	Yulon Luxgen Dinos; Taiwan Beer	Tied for the championship	Premature ending	
Taiwan	2020–21 P League+	Taipei Fubon Braves	Formosa Taishin Dreamers	Premature ending	
Thailand	2021 Thailand Basketball League				
Vietnam	2021 Vietnam Basketball League				

==== Americas ====
Nation	Tournament	Champion	Runner-up	Result	Playoff format
Argentina	2020–21 Liga Nacional de Básquet Season	San Lorenzo	Quimsa	3–2	Best-of-5 series
Brazil	2020–21 NBB season	Flamengo	São Paulo	3–0	Best-of-5 series
Canada	2021 CEBL season	Edmonton Stingers	Niagara River Lions	101–65	Single-game final
Chile	2020–21 Liga Nacional de Básquetbol de Chile				
United States (Note: The NBA and the G League each include one team from Canada.)	2020–21 NBA season	Milwaukee Bucks	Phoenix Suns	4–2	Best-of-7 series
United States	2020–21 NBA G League season	Lakeland Magic	Delaware Blue Coats	97–78	Single-game final
United States	2021 NBA Summer League	Sacramento Kings	Boston Celtics	100–67	Single-game final
Venezuela	2021 Copa LPB				

==== African ====
Nation	Tournament	Champion	Runner-up	Result	Playoff format
Algeria	2020–21 Algerian Basketball Cup				
Angola	2020–21 Angolan Basketball League	Petro de Luanda	G.D. Interclube	3–0	Best-of-5 series
Egypt	2020–21 Egyptian Basketball Super League				
Egypt	2020–21 Egypt Basketball Cup	Al Ittihad	Al Ahly	78–76	Single-game final
Egypt	2020–21 Egyptian Basketball Super Cup				
Mali	2020–21 Ligue 1				
Mali	2021 Malian Cup				
Mozambique	2021 Mozambican Basketball League				
Nigeria	2021 NBBF President Cup				
Senegal	2021 Nationale 1 season				
South Africa	2020–21 BNL	Egoli magic	S'Panther	85–76	Single-game final
Tunisia	2020–21 Championnat National A	US Monastir	Ezzahra Sports	2–0	Best-of-3 series
Tunisia	2021 Tunisian Basketball Cup				

==== Oceania ====
Nation	Tournament	Champion	Runner-up	Result	Playoff format
Australia	2020–21 NBL season	Melbourne United	Perth Wildcats	3–0	Best-of-5 series
New Zealand	2021 New Zealand NBL season	Wellington Saints	Hawke's Bay Hawks	77–75	Single Game Final

==== Other Country ====
Nation	Tournament	Champion	Runner-up	Result	Playoff format
North Cyprus	2020–21 Erkekler Basketbol Süper Ligi				

=== Women ===
==== Europe ====
Nation	Tournament	Champion	Runner-up	Result	Playoff format
Albania	2020–21 Albanian A-1 League				
Albania	2021 Albanian Basketball Cup				
Albania	2021 Albanian Basketball Supercup				
Austria	2020–21 Austrian Women's Basketball Bundesliga	Duches Klosterneuburg W	UBI Graz W	3–1	Best-of-5 series
Belarus	2020–21 Belarus Women's premier League	Horizont Minsk W	Tsmoki Minsk W	2–0	Best-of-3 series
Belgium	2020–21 Belgian Women's Basketball League	Namur W	Braine W	20–0	Single-game final
Bosnia and Herzegovina	2020–21 Prvenstvo BiH Women	Orlovi W	Feniks W	3–1	Best-of-5 series
Bosnia and Herzegovina	2020–21 Basketball Cup of Bosnia and Herzegovina				
Bulgaria	2021 Bulgarian Women's Basketball Championship				
Bulgaria	2021 Bulgarian Women's Basketball Cup				
Croatia	2020–21 Croatian First Women's Basketball League				
Croatia	2020–21 Ružica Meglaj-Rimac Cup				
Cyprus	2020–21 Cyprus Women's Basketball Division A				
Czech Republic	2020–21 Czech Women's Basketball League	USK Prague W	Hradec Kralove W	2–0	Best-of-3 series
Denmark	2021 Dameligaen				
Denmark	2020–21 Danish Women's Basketball Cup	Amager W	Wolfpack W	67–53	Single-game final
Estonia	2020–21 Women's Korvpalli Meistriliiga	BC Kalev/Cramo W	Parnu W	2–0	Best-of-3 series
Finland	2020–21 Naisten Korisliiga	Peli-Karhut W	Tapiolan Honka	3–1	Best-of-5 series
France	2020–21 Ligue Féminine de Basketball	Basket Landes	Basket Lattes	72–64	Single-game final
Germany	2020–21 Damen-Basketball-Bundesliga				
United Kingdom	2020–21 WBBL	London Lions	Newcastle Eagles W	93–71	Single-game final
United Kingdom	2020–21 WBBL Cup	Leicester Riders	Sevenoaks Suns	78–67	Single-game final
Greece	2020–21 Greek Women's Basketball League	Panathinaikos	Olympiacos	2–1	Best-of-3 series
Hungary	2020–21 Nemzeti Bajnokság I/A	Sopron Basket	Atomerőmű KSC Szekszárd	3–1	Best-of-5 series
Iceland	2020–21 Úrvalsdeild kvenna	Valur	Haukar	3–0	Best-of-5 series
Iceland	2020–21 Icelandic Women's Basketball Cup	Haukar	Fjölnir	94–89	Single-game final
Iceland	2021 Icelandic Women's Basketball Supercup	Haukar	Valur	62–58	Single-game final
Ireland	2020–21 Women's Super League				
Israel	2020–21 Israeli Female Basketball Premier League	Maccabi Bnot Ashdod	Maccabi Ramat Hen	2–1	Best-of-3 series
Italy	2020–21 Lega Basket Femminile	Reyer Venezia	PF Schio	3–2	Best-of-5 series
Kosovo	2020–21 ETC Women's Superleague	Penza Peja W	Bashkimi Prizren	3–2	Best-of-5 series
Latvia	2021 LSBL Championships				
Lithuania	2020–21 Lithuanian Women's Basketball League				
Luxembourg	2020–21 Nationale 1 Dames				
North Macedonia	2020–21 First Women's Basketball League of Macedonia				
North Macedonia	2020–21 Macedonian Women's Basketball Cup				
Montenegro	2020–21 First A Women's Basketball League of Montenegro				
Montenegro	2020–21 Montenegrin Women's Basketball Cup				
Netherlands	2020–21 Women's Basketball League				
Norway	2020–21 Women's BLNO				
Poland	2020–21 Basket Liga Kobiet				
Portugal	2020–21 Liga Feminina de Basquetebol				
Portugal	2020–21 Portuguese Women's Basketball Cup				
Romania	2020–21 Liga Națională				
Romania	2021 Cupa României				
Russia	2020–21 Russian Women's Basketball Premier League				
Serbia	2020–21 First Women's Basketball League of Serbia				
Serbia	2020–21 Milan Ciga Vasojević Cup	Art Basket	Vojvodina 021	83–74	Single-game final
Slovakia	2020–21 Slovak Women's Basketball Extraliga				
Slovenia	2020–21 Slovenian Women's Basketball League				
Slovenia	2020–21 Slovenian Women's Basketball Cup				
Spain	2020–21 Liga Femenina de Baloncesto				
Spain	2021 Copa de la Reina de Baloncesto				
Spain	2021 Supercopa de España de Baloncesto Femenino				
Spain	2020–21 Liga Femenina 2 de Baloncesto				
Sweden	2020–21 Basketligan dam				
Switzerland	2020–21 Swiss Women's Basketball Championship				
Turkey	2020–21 Women's Basketball Super League				
Turkey	2020–21 Turkish Women's Basketball Cup				
Turkey	2021 Turkish Women's Basketball Presidential Cup				
Ukraine	2020–21 Ukrainian Women's Basketball SuperLeague				

==== Asia ====
Nation	Tournament	Champion	Runner-up	Result	Playoff format
China	2021 WCBA season	Inner Mongolia Nongxin	Xinjiang WJ	93–82	Single-game final
Japan	2020–21 Women's Japan Basketball League	JOMO Sunflowers	Toyota Antelopes	2–0	Best-of-3 series
South Korea	2020–21 Women's Korean Basketball League	Samsung Life Blueminx	Cheongju KB Stars	3–2	Best-of-5 series
Taiwan	2021 Women's Super Basketball League	Cathay Life	Taiyuan Textile	Premature ending	

==== Americas ====
Nation	Tournament	Champion	Runner-up	Result	Playoff format
United States	2021 WNBA season	Chicago Sky	Phoenix Mercury	3–1	Best-of-5 series
United States	2021 WNBA Commissioner's Cup	Seattle Storm	Connecticut Sun	79–57	Single-game final
United States	2021 Women's Basketball Development Association Season				

==== Oceania ====
Nation	Tournament	Champion	Runner-up	Result	Playoff format
Australia	2020–21 WNBL season	Southside Flyers	Townsville Fire	99–82	Single-game final

== College seasons ==
=== Men's ===
Nation	League / Tournament	Champions	Runners-up	Result	Playoff format
Canada	2021 U Sports Men's Basketball Championship	Not held due to COVID-19			
Philippines	PCCL National Collegiate Championship	Not held due to COVID-19			
United States	NCAA Division I	Baylor Bears	Gonzaga Bulldogs	86–70	Single-game final
United States	National Invitation Tournament	Memphis Tigers	Mississippi State Bulldogs	77–64	Single-game final
United States	NCAA Division II	Northwest Missouri State Bearcats	West Texas A&M Buffaloes	80–54	Single-game final
United States	NCAA Division III	Not held due to COVID-19			
United States	NAIA	Shawnee State Bears	Lewis–Clark State Warriors	74–68	Single-game final

=== Women's ===
Nation	League / Tournament	Champions	Runners-up	Result	Playoff format
Canada	2021 U Sports Women's Basketball Championship	Not held due to COVID-19			
Philippines	UAAP Season 83	Not held due to COVID-19			
United States	NCAA Division I	Stanford Cardinal	Arizona Wildcats	54–53	Single-game final
United States	Women's National Invitation Tournament	Rice Owls	Ole Miss Rebels	71–58	Single-game final
United States	NCAA Division II	Lubbock Christian Lady Chaps	Drury Panthers	69–59	Single-game final
United States	NCAA Division III	Not held due to COVID-19			
United States	NAIA	Westmont Warriors	Thomas More Saints	72–61	Single-game final

== Deaths ==
- January 2 — Paul Westphal, 70, Hall of Fame American NBA player (Phoenix Suns, Boston Celtics) and NBA (Phoenix Suns, Seattle SuperSonics, Sacramento Kings) and college coach (Grand Canyon, Pepperdine).
- January 5 — András Haán, 74, Hungarian Olympic player (1964).
- January 7 — Grant Gondrezick, 57, American NBA player (Phoenix Suns, Los Angeles Clippers).
- January 10 — Wayne Radford, 64, American NBA player (Indiana Pacers) and NCAA champion at Indiana (1976).
- January 10 — Dee Rowe, 91, American college coach (UConn).
- January 13 — Borivoje Cenić, 90, Serbian player (Radnički Belgrade) and coach (OKK Beograd, Apollon Patras).
- January 18 — Tony Ingle, 68, American college coach (BYU, Kennesaw State, Dalton State).
- January 19 — Lou Goetz, 74, American college coach (Richmond).
- January 19 — Bob Williams, 89, American NBA player (Minneapolis Lakers).
- January 22 — Gianfranco Lombardi, 79, Italian player (Virtus Bologna) and coach (Scaligera Verona). Three-time Olympian (1960, 1964, 1968).
- January 23 — Wayne Stevens, 84, American NBA player (Cincinnati Royals).
- January 23 — Harthorne Wingo, 73, American NBA player (New York Knicks).
- January 24 — Jerry Johnson, 102, American college coach (LeMoyne–Owen).
- January 26 — Sekou Smith, 48, American sportswriter who covered the NBA.
- January 29 — John Chaney, 89, Hall of Fame American college coach (Cheyney, Temple).
- February 7 — Lew Hill, 55, American college coach (Texas–Rio Grande Valley)
- February 8 — Phil Rollins, 87, American NBA player (Philadelphia Warriors, Cincinnati Royals, St. Louis Hawks, New York Knicks).
- February 10 — Dick Bunt, 91, American NBA player (New York Knicks, Baltimore Bullets).
- February 13 — Ansley Truitt, 70, American ABA player (Dallas Chaparrals).
- March 10 — Joe Tait, 83, American NBA announcer (Cleveland Cavaliers).
- March 12 — Miodrag Baletić, 72, Montenegrin coach (KK Budućnost, KK MZT Skopje).
- March 12 — Dwight Waller, 75, American NBA (Atlanta Hawks) and ABA (Denver Rockets) player.
- March 13 — Bob Davis, 93, American college coach (High Point, Georgetown (KY), Auburn).
- March 20 — Jack Phelan, 95, American NBA player (Waterloo Hawks, Sheboygan Red Skins).
- March 22 — Elgin Baylor, 86, American Hall of Fame NBA player (Los Angeles Lakers) and executive (Los Angeles Clippers).
- March 23 — Benny Dees, 86, American college coach (VCU, New Orleans, Wyoming, Western Carolina).
- March 23 — Joe Vancisin, 98, American college coach (Yale).
- March 23 — Granville Waiters, 60, American NBA player (Indiana Pacers, Houston Rockets, Chicago Bulls).
- March 25 — Stan Albeck, 89, American NBA (Cleveland Cavaliers, San Antonio Spurs, New Jersey Nets, Chicago Bulls) and college (Bradley) coach.
- March 31 — Ron Greene, 82, American college coach (New Orleans, Mississippi State, Murray State, Indiana State).
- April 3 — Ho Lien Siew, 88, Singaporean Olympic player (1956).
- April 10 — Vito Fabris, 66, Italian player (Fulgor Libertas Forlì, Pallacanestro Firenze, Basket Mestre, Olimpia Pistoia).
- April 11 — Miguel López Abril, 66, Spanish player (FC Barcelona Bàsquet, Bàsquet Manresa, Baloncesto Málaga).
- April 13 — Bruce Larson, American college coach (Arizona).
- April 13 — Bobby Leonard, 88, American NBA player (Los Angeles Lakers, Chicago Packers) and Hall of Fame ABA coach (Indiana Pacers).
- April 13 — Ruth Roberta de Souza, 52, Brazilian Olympic player (1992).
- April 14 — Frank Card, 76, American ABA player (Minnesota Pipers, Virginia Squires, Carolina Cougars, Denver Rockets).
- April 15 — Bill Thieben, 86, American NBA player (Detroit Pistons).
- April 16 — Nelson Haggerty, 47, American college coach (Midwestern State)
- April 18 — Frank McCabe, 93, American Olympic gold medalist (1952).
- April 19 — Shaler Halimon, 76, American NBA and ABA player (Philadelphia 76ers, Chicago Bulls, Portland Trail Blazers, Atlanta Hawks, Dallas Chaparrals).
- April 22 — Terrence Clarke, 19, American college player (Kentucky)
- May 3 — Steve McKean, 77, New Zealand coach.
- May 3 — Masatomo Taniguchi, 75, Japanese Olympic player (1972).
- May 4 — Jim Hagan, 83, American college All-American (Tennessee Tech) and AAU player (Phillips 66ers).
- May 8 — Cal Luther, 93, American college coach (DePauw, Murray State, Longwood, UT Martin, Bethel).
- May 10 — Miguel Arellano, 80, Mexican Olympic player (1964, 1968).
- May 14 — Bob Jones, 81, American college coach (Kentucky Wesleyan).
- May 20 — Jean Bayle-Lespitau, 92, French administrator (Ligue nationale de basket).
- May 26 — Spas Natov, 53, Bulgarian player (BC Cherno More).
- May 28 — Mark Eaton, 64, American NBA player (Utah Jazz).
- May 30 — Ralph Davis, 82, American NBA player (Cincinnati Royals, Chicago Packers).
- June 2 — Eric Mobley, 51, American NBA player (Milwaukee Bucks, Vancouver Grizzlies).
- June 15 — Jim Phelan, 92, American NBA player (Philadelphia Warriors) and college coach (Mount Saint Mary's).
- July 7 — Eddie Payne, 69, American college coach (Belmont Abbey, East Carolina, Oregon State, Greensboro, USC Upstate).
- July 21 — Stan McKenzie, 76, American NBA player (Baltimore Bullets, Phoenix Suns, Portland Trail Blazers, Houston Rockets).
- July 26 — Cliff Anderson, 76, American NBA player (Los Angeles Lakers, Denver Rockets, Cleveland Cavaliers, Philadelphia 76ers).
- August 3 – Tommy Curtis, 69, American college player (UCLA Bruins)
- August 24 – Jerry Harkness, 81, American NBA player (New York Knicks, Indiana Pacers), college national champion at Loyola Chicago (1963).
- August 26 — Rafael Hechanova, 93, Filipino Olympic player (1952).
- September 6 – Dick Parfitt, 90, American college coach (Central Michigan).
- September 6 – Frank Russell, 72, American NBA player (Chicago Bulls).
- September 9 — Gene Littles, 78, American college (North Carolina A&T) and NBA (Charlotte Hornets) coach.
- September 16 – Dušan Ivković, 77, Serbian coach (Partizan, Olympiacos, CSKA Moscow), FIBA Hall of Famer (2017), EuroLeague Basketball Legend (2017)
- September 18 — Neil McCarthy, 82, American college coach (Weber State, New Mexico State).
- October 2 — Major Wingate, 37, American player.
- October 5 — Jerry Shipp, 86, American player (Phillips 66ers), Olympic gold medalist (1964)
- October 12 — Leon Black, American college coach (Lon Morris, Texas).
- October 27 — Bob Ferry, 84, American NBA player (St. Louis Hawks, Detroit Pistons, Baltimore Bullets) and executive (Washington Bullets).
- October 30 — Lafayette Stribling, 87, American college coach (Mississippi Valley State, Tougaloo).
- November 7 — Ronnie Williams, 59, American college player (Florida).
- November 8 — Medina Dixon, 59, American college player (Old Dominion) and Olympic bronze medalist (1992).
- November 12 — Davíð Janis, 75, Icelandic and Indonesian basketball player and one of the first foreign basketball players to play in Iceland.
- November 19 — Don Kojis, 82, American NBA player.
- November 25 — Risto Kala, 80, Finnish Olympic player (1964).
- December 5 — Stevan Jelovac, 32, Serbian player (Mega Vizura, CAI Zaragoza, AEK B.C.).
- December 11 — Ed Gayda, 94, American NBA player (Tri-Cities Blackhawks).
- December 30 — Sam Jones, 88, American NBA player (Boston Celtics). 10-time NBA champion.
- December 31 — Christine Grant, 85, American college athletics administrator (Iowa), member of the Women's Basketball Hall of Fame.
