= 2019 NAIA Division I women's basketball tournament =

- Teams: 32
- Finals site: Rimrock Auto Arena at MetraPark, Billings, Montana
- Champions: Montana Western Bulldogs (1st title, 1st title game, 2nd Fab Four)
- Runner-up: Oklahoma City Stars (13th title game, 15th Fab Four)
- Semifinalists: Freed–Hardeman Lions (8th Fab Four); Our Lady of the Lake Saints (1st Fab Four)
- Coach of the year: Lindsay Wooley (Montana Western)
- Player of the year: Bri King (Montana Western)
- Charles Stevenson Hustle Award: Britt Cooper (Montana Western)
- Chuck Taylor MVP: Bri King (Montana Western)
- Top scorer: Brianna King (Montana Western) (126 points)

The 2019 NAIA Division I women's basketball tournament was the tournament held by the NAIA to determine the national champion of women's college basketball among its Division I members in the United States and Canada for the 2018–19 basketball season.

With the cancellation of the 2020 tournament due to the COVID-19 pandemic and the NAIA's coincident consolidation of its two divisions, this was the final completed edition of a separate Division I NAIA women's basketball tournament.

Montana Western defeated Oklahoma City in the championship game, 75–59, to claim the Bulldogs' first NAIA national title.

The tournament was played at the Rimrock Auto Arena at MetraPark in Billings, Montana.

== Qualification ==
The tournament field remained fixed at thirty-two teams. No teams were seeded.

The tournament continued to utilize a simple single-elimination format.

== Bracket ==
First round
Bethel (TN)	49
Lindsey Wilson	60
Dillard	53
Freed–Hardeman	63
LSU Alexandria	70
Westmont	63
Lewis–Clark State	64
William Penn	58
The Master's	54
USAO	40
MidAmerica Nazarene	72
Xavier Louisiana	65
Georgetown (KY)	69
Montana Western	89
Lyon (AR)	77
Vanguard	73
Loyola New Orleans	84
Our Lady of the Lake	89
Wayland Baptist	83
William Jessup	38
Talladega	65
Menlo	49
Providence (MT)	84
Campbellsville	89
Clarke (IA)	62
Columbia (MO)	59
Shawnee State	65
Rocky Mountain	57
Carroll (MT)	58
Pikeville	45
Arizona Christian	71
Oklahoma City	75

Second round
Lindsey Wilson	43
Freed–Hardeman	61
LSU Alexandria	66
Lewis–Clark State	69
The Master's	65
MidAmerica Nazarene	45
Montana Western	70
Lyon (AR)	58
Our Lady of the Lake	96
Wayland Baptist	93
Talladega	56
Campbellsville	74
Clarke (IA)	71
Shawnee State	68
Carroll (MT)	59
Oklahoma City	60

Quarterfinals
Freed–Hardeman	82
Lewis–Clark State	60
The Master's	55
Montana Western	60
Our Lady of the Lake	94
Campbellsville	88
Clarke (IA)	72
Oklahoma City	76

Semifinals
Freed–Hardeman	71
Montana Western	78
Our Lady of the Lake	70
Oklahoma City	85

National championship
Montana Western	75
Oklahoma City	59

== See also ==
- 2019 NAIA Division I men's basketball tournament
- 2019 NCAA Division I women's basketball tournament
- 2019 NCAA Division II women's basketball tournament
- 2019 NCAA Division III women's basketball tournament
- 2019 NAIA Division II women's basketball tournament
