= 2020 NAIA Division I men's basketball tournament =

Cancelled college basketball tournament

- Teams: 32
- Finals site: Municipal Auditorium; Kansas City, Missouri

The 2022 NAIA Division II men's basketball tournament was due to be the tournament held by the NAIA to determine the national champion of men's college basketball among its Division I members in the United States and Canada for the 2019–20 basketball season.

Due to the unfolding COVID-19 pandemic, the tournament was cancelled by the NAIA before any games could be played. In turn, no champion was crowned.

The NAIA had predetermined that this would be the final edition of a separate Division I tournament, planning to consolidate its two divisional tournaments back into a single event for 2021. With the cancellation of this event, the 2019 edition was the last completed edition of the tournament.

The tournament was due to be played at the Municipal Auditorium in Kansas City, Missouri.

== Bracket ==
First round March 18–19, 2020	Second round March 20, 2020
1	Georgetown (KY)
8	MidAmerica Nazarene
5	Arizona Christian
4	Tougaloo
Naismith Bracket; March 18, 2020
3	John Brown
6	Harris–Stowe State
7	Shawnee State
2	Faulkner
2	William Penn
7	Central Baptist
6	Texas Wesleyan
3	Carroll (MT)
Cramer Bracket; March 19, 2020
4	LSU Alexandria
5	Menlo
8	Pikeville
1	Dalton State
1	LSU Shreveport
8	Wayland Baptist
5	The Master's
4	Cumberlands (KY)
Duer Bracket; March 19, 2020
3	SAGU
6	Loyola New Orleans
7	Talladega
2	Lewis–Clark State
2	Westmont
7	Stillman
6	Clarke
3	Xavier Louisiana
Liston Bracket; March 18, 2020
4	Providence (MT)
5	Thomas More
8	Hope International
1	Mid-America Christian

Quarterfinals; March 21, 2020

National Semifinals; March 23, 2020

National Championship; March 24, 2020

== See also ==
- 2020 NAIA Division II men's basketball tournament
- 2020 NAIA Division I women's basketball tournament
- 2020 NCAA Division I men's basketball tournament
- 2020 NCAA Division II men's basketball tournament
- 2020 NCAA Division III men's basketball tournament
