= Vid Milenkovic =

Swiss basketball player

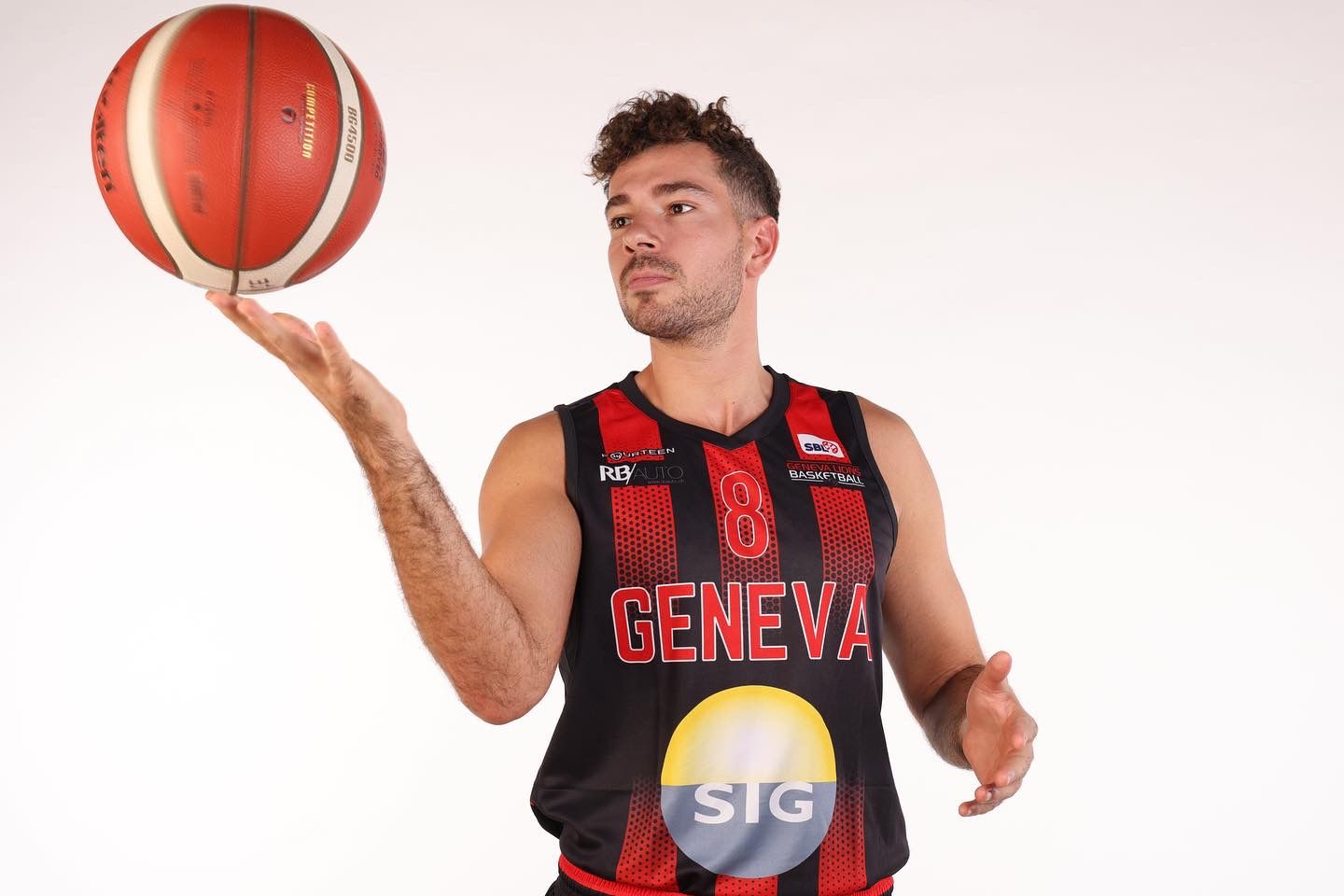
- Milenkovic with the Geneva Lions in 2022

No. 33 – Nideros Jets
- Position: Guard
- League: Swiss Basketball League

Personal information
- Born: July 21, 1995 (age 31) Zürich, Switzerland
- Listed height: 6 ft 5 in (1.96 m)
- Listed weight: 209 lb (95 kg)

Career information
- College: University of Wisconsin–Superior (2014–2020)
- NBA draft: 2020: undrafted
- Playing career: 2020–present

Career history
- 2020–2021: Starwings Basket Regio Basel
- 2021–2022: Lions de Genève
- 2022–2024: Starwings Basel
- 2024–present: Nideros Jets

Vid Milenkovic (born July 21, 1995), is a Swiss professional basketball player for Nideros Jets of the Basketligaen Norge, the first-tier level of professional basketball league in Norway. Standing at 1.95 metres (6 ft 5 in), he plays at the guard position.

== College career ==
After graduating from the German School of Belgrade (DSB) in 2014, Vid decided to major in exercise science with minors in coaching and sport management while starting his college basketball career in the NCAA Division III, where he played six seasons at the University of Wisconsin-Superior, in which he averaged 10.39 points and 6.39 rebounds per game.

=== College statistics ===
Year	Team	GP	GS	MPG	%TC	%3P	%FT	RPG	APG	SPG	BPG	PPG
2014–15	University of Wisconsin–Superior	5	0	1.8	.333	.500	.000	0.4	0.2	0.0	0.0	0.6
2015–16	University of Wisconsin–Superior	26	19	26.7	.492	.333	.596	5.81	1.58	0.62	0.19	8.46
2016–17	University of Wisconsin–Superior	-	-	-	-	-	-	-	-	-	-	-
2017–18	University of Wisconsin–Superior	25	25	34.1	.533	.427	.744	8.2	2.32	0.84	0.72	14.36
2018–19	University of Wisconsin–Superior	-	-	-	-	-	-	-	-	-	-	-
2019–20	University of Wisconsin–Superior	26	26	31.3	.522	.396	.755	9.5	2.23	1.35	0.38	17.54
Total		56	44	27.8	.514	.413	.683	6.39	1.79	0.66	0.41	10.39

== Professional career ==
After going undrafted in the 2020 NBA draft, Milenkovic joined the roster of the Starwings Basket Regio Basel is a Swiss professional basketball club based in Basel. The club competes in the Swiss Basketball League (SBL), the highest tier of basketball in Switzerland.

On 2021, he signed with Lions de Genève, a professional basketball club based in the city of Geneva, Switzerland. The Lions currently play in the Swiss top-tier Swiss Basketball League (SBL).

=== Starwings 2021 Swiss Basketball Final Run ===
Vid Milenkovic scored 26 Points against Neuchatel in the semifinals of the 2021 Swiss Basketball Playoffs, helping the Starwings to reach the finals for the first time in their history. In fact this is the first time a team from the Swiss german part has ever been to the finals in the history of Swiss Basketball. In the finals the Vid Milenkovic and the Starwings would lose to Fribourg Olympic. Despite the loss in the finals, this run has been considered a great success in Vid Milnkovic's first year as a pro. During the playoffs he averaged 13.3 points per game and was the most efficient Swiss player on his team.

== National team ==
Vid Milenkovic participated in the 2015 FIBA Europe Under-20 Championship Division B. Milenkovic is currently part of the 21 Men Swiss National Team Roaster.

== Off the court ==
Besides playing professional basketball, Vid is also the founder and the head of the basketball community from Zurich called "BÖLLE". With BÖLLE Vid and his team try to promote the sport of Basketball in Zürich. Mostly it is through youth camps, public events and social media content. The biggest projects were, hosting a camp with 100 campers, building a court in Guinea and generating more than 3000 followers on instagram.
