= 2019 NCAA Division III women's basketball tournament =

- Teams: 64
- Finals site: Cregger Center, Salem, Virginia
- Champions: Thomas More Saints (2nd title)
- Runner-up: Bowdoin Polar Bears (3rd title game)
- Semifinalists: St. Thomas (MN) Tommies (7th Final Four); Scranton Royals (9th Final Four)
- Winning coach: Jeff Hans (2nd title)
- MOP: Madison Temple (Thomas More)
- Attendance: 33,601

The 2019 NCAA Division III women's basketball tournament was the 38th annual tournament hosted by the NCAA to determine the national champion of Division III women's collegiate basketball in the United States.

Thomas More defeated Bowdoin in the championship game, 81–67, to claim the Saints' second Division III national title (Thomas More's 2015 title was vacated and does not count toward official NCAA records).

The championship rounds were hosted by Roanoke College at the Cregger Center in Salem, Virginia.

== Bracket ==
=== Top left sectional ===
First round March 1, 2019; Regional sites
Thomas More	79
Saint Vincent	54
Crestview Hills, KY
Trine	57
Emory	54
Transylvania	77
Piedmont	67
Lexington, KY
Chicago	51
Oglethorpe	57
UT Dallas	62
Texas Lutheran	51
Richardson, TX
Mary Hardin-Baylor	70
Rhodes	56
Washington St. Louis	72
UW Whitewater	56
St. Louis, MO
George Fox	85
Greenville	53

Second round March 2, 2019; Regional sites
Thomas More	67
Trine	59
Transylvania	76
Oglethorpe	56
UT Dallas	57
Mary Hardin-Baylor	66
Washington St. Louis	86
George Fox	78

Sectional semifinals March 8, 2019; Crestview Hills, KY
Thomas More	89
Transylvania	74
Mary Hardin-Baylor	46
Washington St. Louis	63

Sectional finals March 9, 2019; Crestview Hills, KY
Thomas More	87
Washington St. Louis	72

=== Bottom left sectional ===
First round March 1, 2019; Regional sites
Scranton	69
New England College	49
Scranton, PA
Johns Hopkins	58
East. Conn. State	42
Gettysburg	78
Christopher Newport	82
Gettysburg, PA
Mount Saint Mary	85
Westfield State	80
Messiah	71
Hilbert	60
Grantham, PA
RIT	71
Baldwin Wallace	73
Haverford	80
Rosemont	37
Tufts
Tufts	70
Western New England	44

Second round March 2, 2019; Regional sites
Scranton	59
Johns Hopkins	46
Christopher Newport	79
Mount Saint Mary	52
Messiah	64
Baldwin Wallace	51
Haverford	46
Tufts	52

Sectional semifinals March 8, 2019; Scranton, PA
Scranton	57
Christopher Newport	56
Messiah	41
Tufts	55

Sectional finals March 9, 2019; Scranton, PA
Scranton	44
Tufts	40

=== Top right sectional ===
First round March 1, 2019; Regional sites
St. Thomas (MN)	88
Ripon	58
St. Paul, MN
Illinois Wesleyan	40
Wisconsin Lutheran	48
Vassar	55
SUNY Geneseo	74
Amherst, MA
Amherst	66
Husson	45
UW Oshkosh	72
Pomona-Pitzer	46
Oshkosh, WI
DePauw	78
Loras	54
Hope	67
Wheaton (IL)	55
Waverly, IA
Wartburg	91
Bethany Lutheran	63

Second round March 2, 2019; Regional sites
St. Thomas (MN)	67
Wisconsin Lutheran	51
SUNY Geneseo	46
Amherst	58
UW Oshkosh	54
DePauw	52
Hope	49
Wartburg	79

Sectional semifinals March 8, 2019; St. Paul, MN
St. Thomas (MN)	61*
Amherst	58
UW Oshkosh	57
Wartburg	70

Sectional finals March 9, 2019; St. Paul, MN
St. Thomas (MN)	85
Wartburg	56

=== Bottom right sectional ===
First round March 1, 2019; Regional sites
DeSales	77
Shenandoah	49
Center Valley, PA
John Carroll	54
Middlebury	62
MIT	61
Saint Joseph's (ME)	68
Ithaca, NY
Ithaca	68
SUNY Poly	58
SUNY New Paltz	65
Rutgers Newark	36
New Paltz, NY
Hartwick	65
Emmanuel (MA)	69
Smith	74
Merchant Marine	54
Northampton, MA
Bowdoin	93
Hunter	73

Second round March 2, 2019; Regional sites
DeSales	70
Middlebury	55
St. Joseph's (ME)	63
Ithaca	74
SUNY New Paltz	80
Emmanuel (MA)	49
Smith	78
Bowdoin	87

Sectional semifinals March 8, 2019; Brunswick, ME
DeSales	75
Ithaca	76
SUNY New Paltz	50
Bowdoin	81

Sectional finals March 9, 2019; Brunswick, ME
Ithaca	61
Bowdoin	87

=== Final Four ===
Final Four; March 15, 2019; Cregger Center; Salem, VA
Thomas More	69
Scranton	54
St. Thomas (MN)	60
Bowdoin	71

National championship March 16, 2019; Cregger Center; Salem, VA
Thomas More	81
Bowdoin	67

== All-tournament team ==
- Abby Kelly, Bowdoin
- Makenzie Mason, Scranton
- Hannah Spaulding, St. Thomas (MN)
- Shelby Rupp, Thomas More
- Madison Temple, Thomas More

== See also ==
- 2019 NCAA Division I women's basketball tournament
- 2019 NCAA Division II women's basketball tournament
- 2019 NAIA Division I women's basketball tournament
- 2019 NAIA Division II women's basketball tournament
- 2019 NCAA Division III men's basketball tournament
