= Joël Fuchs =

Swiss basketball player (born 1989)

Starwings Basel
- Position: Point guard
- League: Ligue Nationale de Basketball

Personal information
- Born: 24 June 1989 (age 37) Dielsdorf, Switzerland
- Listed height: 6 ft 3 in (1.91 m)

Career information
- Playing career: 2008–present

Career history
- 2008–: Starwings Basel

Joël Fuchs (born 24 June 1989) is a Swiss professional basketball player. He currently plays for the Starwings Basel of the Ligue Nationale de Basketball in Switzerland, where he is the team captain.

He has been a member of the Swiss national basketball team on several occasions.
