= 2020 NAIA Division II men's basketball tournament =

Partially cancelled college basketball tournament

- Teams: 32
- Finals site: Sanford Pentagon; Sioux Falls, South Dakota

The 2020 NAIA Division II men's basketball tournament was the partially-completed tournament held by the NAIA to determine the national champion of men's college basketball among its Division II members in the United States and Canada for the 2019–20 basketball season.

Due to the onset of the COVID-19 pandemic, only a single round of the tournament was completed before it was ultimately cancelled by the NAIA. In turn, no champion was crowned.

The NAIA had predetermined that this would be the final edition of a separate Division II tournament, planning to consolidate its two divisional tournaments back into a single event for 2021. With the cancellation of this event, the 2019 event was the last completed edition of the tournament.

The completed games of the tournament were played at the Sanford Pentagon in Sioux Falls, South Dakota.

== Bracket ==
First round March 11–12, 2020	Second round March 13, 2020
1	College of Idaho	67
8	Northwestern (IA)	49
1	College of Idaho
5	IU Kokomo
5	IU Kokomo	70
4	Madonna	68
Naismith Bracket; March 11, 2020
3	Antelope Valley	85
6	Washington Adventist	68
3	Antelope Valley
2	Marian
7	Keiser	60
2	Marian	71
2	Ottawa (KS)	87
7	Concordia Nebraska	84
2	Ottawa (KS)
6	Saint Francis (IN)
6	Saint Francis (IN)	82
3	Union (KY)	76
Cramer Bracket; March 12, 2020
4	Grace Lancers
5	West Virginia Tech
8	Lincoln (IL)
1	Olivet Nazarene
1	Indiana Wesleyan
8	Crowley's Ridge
5	IU East
4	Southeastern (FL)
Duer Bracket; March 12, 2020
3	Dakota Wesleyan
6	IU South Bend
7	Mayville State
2	Oregon Tech
2	Southern Oregon	85
7	Montreat	67
2	Southern Oregon
3	Holy Cross (IN)
6	Indiana Tech	56
3	Holy Cross (IN)	60
Liston Bracket; March 11, 2020
4	Oklahoma Wesleyan	70
5	Spring Arbor	68
4	Oklahoma Wesleyan
1	Morningside
8	College of the Ozarks	58
1	Morningside	99

Quarterfinals; March 14, 2020

National Semifinals; March 16, 2020

National Championship; March 17, 2020

== See also ==
- 2020 NAIA Division I men's basketball tournament
- 2020 NCAA Division I men's basketball tournament
- 2020 NCAA Division II men's basketball tournament
- 2020 NCAA Division III men's basketball tournament
- 2020 NAIA Division II women's basketball tournament
