= 2021 NCAA Division III men's basketball tournament =

Canceled American basketball tournament (2021)

- Teams: 64
- Finals site: Allen County War Memorial Coliseum, Fort Wayne, Indiana
- Canceled due to COVID-19 pandemic

The 2021 NCAA Division III men's basketball tournament was to have been the tournament hosted by the NCAA to determine the national champion of Division III men's collegiate basketball in the United States for the 2021–22 NCAA Division III men's basketball season. However, the tournament was cancelled due to an insufficient number of teams participating in Division III. Only 48.6% of schools participated in men's basketball when 60% was required as schools were in the midst of reopening after the COVID-19 pandemic the previous March.

The championship rounds were scheduled to be played at the Allen County War Memorial Coliseum in Fort Wayne, Indiana.

== D3Sports.com National Championship Game ==
Despite not having an official championship, D3Sports.com organised a weekly poll for the eight weeks of play, similar to the AP Poll and Coaches Poll in Division I. On March 13, 2021, the Trine Thunder (17–0), which was No. 2 in the D3sports.com poll, traveled to the Randolph-Macon Yellow Jackets (11–0), No. 1 in the same poll, for a game billed as a "postseason bowl game" by organisers. Trine won the Michigan Intercollegiate Athletic Association regular season and tournament championships, and Randolph-Macon only played three games in the Old Dominion Athletic Conference regular season, but won the tournament championship.

The two teams agreed to the game, which Brooks Miller, head coach of Trine said in a statement, "We are extremely excited about this opportunity for our student-athletes to continue our season by competing against the #1 team in the country. I want to thank Coach Merkel at Randolph Macon College for agreeing to make a No. 1 vs. No. 2 matchup possible to help determine a D3hoops.com poll champion as well as our leadership here at Trine.”

Randolph-Macon won the game, 69–55, and finished as the D3hoops.com final poll's top-ranked team, effectively making Randolph-Macon the winners of the D3hoops.com national championship for the season when they finished first in the final poll.

March 14, 2021
2:30 pm

Trine Thunder 55, Randolph-Macon Yellow Jackets 69
Scoring by half: 24-36, 31-33
Pts: Nick Bowman 15; Rebs: Connor Jones 6 Asts: Aiden Warzecha 5	Pts: Miles Mallory 16; Rebs: Miles Mallory, Buzz Anthony, Josh Talbery 6 Asts: Josh Talbert 6

Crenshaw Gymnasium, Ashland, Virginia
Randolph-Macon College
Attendance: Behind Closed Doors
Referees: Matt Oblas, Scott Arbogast, Scott Bennett

The following season, Randolph-Macon repeated their title in 2022, but this time as an official national champion.

== Final D3Sports Poll ==
D3Sports only ranked 15 teams because fewer teams played in 2020–21. Eighteen coaches, Sports Information Directors and media members from across the country ranked teams. For this season only, teams could be ranked only if they played countable games.

Final D3 Top 15 ResultsSource:
Pos	Team	Record	Points
1	Randolph-Macon (15)	12-0	267
2	St. Thomas (3)	7-0	235
3	Yeshiva	7-0	225
4	Illinois Wesleyan	8-1	206
5	Marietta	12-1	196
6	Trine	17-1	187
7	Dubuque	14-0	164
8	Wheaton (Ill.)	12-1	147
9	UW-Platteville	8-2	129
10	DePauw	12-1	96
11	Berry	13-1	74
12	UW-Oshkosh	5-2	69
13	UW-La Crosse	8-3	51
14	Whitworth	12-5	27
15	New Jersey City	7-1	17

== See also ==
- 2021 NCAA Division I men's basketball tournament
- 2021 NCAA Division II men's basketball tournament
- 2021 NAIA men's basketball tournament
- 2021 NCAA Division III women's basketball tournament
