= 2021 NCAA Division III women's basketball tournament =

Cancelled American basketball tournament

- Teams: 64
- Finals site: Cregger Center, Salem, Virginia
- Canceled due to COVID-19 pandemic

The 2021 NCAA Division III women's basketball tournament was to have been the tournament hosted by the NCAA to determine the national champion of Division III women's collegiate basketball in the United States for the 2020–21 NCAA Division III women's basketball season. However, the tournament was cancelled due to the COVID-19 pandemic.

The championship rounds were scheduled to be hosted by Roanoke College at the Cregger Center in Salem, Virginia.

Of schools and conferences that played, the Hope Flying Dutch were declared winner of the mythical national championship through the D3sports.com polls. Hope, like Randolph-Macon in 2021 for men, "repeated" its national championship win with an official NCAA title in 2022.

== See also ==
- 2021 NCAA Division I women's basketball tournament
- 2021 NCAA Division II women's basketball tournament
- 2021 NAIA women's basketball tournament
- 2021 NCAA Division III men's basketball tournament
