= Marvin Hershkowitz =

American basketball player (1931–2020)

Marvin Hershkowitz (March 7, 1931 – May 4, 2020) was the captain of the Yeshiva University Maccabees basketball team in the 1950s, under the leadership of coach Bernard “Red” Sarachek. Hershkowitz later became a coach of the team.

Hershkowitz was born in the Bronx. He was an All-City selection from DeWitt Clinton High School, where he served as varsity team captain, as the team won the New York City Championship in his junior year.

He joined the Yeshiva University team after playing for CCNY for his freshman year. From 1954 to 1957, he was an assistant coach and assistant athletic director at Yeshiva University.

He immigrated to Israel in 1977. Hershkowitz became the administrative director of Yeshivat HaDarom in Rehovot, Israel.

In 2017, Hershkowitz was inducted to the Yeshiva University’s Athletics Hall of Fame. He was the first player in the team’s history to score more than 1,000 points; he scored 1,095 in 54 games. This record ranked him 26th in team history. He held the record for most average points per game for three years (1950–1953), and the record for most field goals (113) in a season.

He also coached basketball for the Ramaz High School.

Hershkowitz died on May 4, 2020, at 89 years of age.
