= 2020 NAIA Division I women's basketball tournament =

- Teams: 32
- Finals site: Rimrock Auto Arena at MetraPark; Billings, Montana

The 2020 NAIA Division I women's basketball tournament was the tournament scheduled to be held by the NAIA to determine the national champion of women's college basketball among its Division I members in the United States and Canada for the 2018–19 basketball season.

The NAIA cancelled the tournament due to the COVID-19 pandemic. It was the first time the tournament had to be cancelled since its establishment in 1981.

Due to the planned consolidation of the two NAIA divisions into a single division ahead of the 2021 tournament, this was also scheduled to be the final edition of a separate Division I NAIA women's tournament.

The tournament was due to be played at the Rimrock Auto Arena at MetraPark in Billings, Montana.

== Qualification ==
The tournament field was due to remain fixed at thirty-two teams, again utilizing a single-elimination format.

== See also ==
- 2020 NAIA Division I men's basketball tournament
- 2020 NCAA Division I women's basketball tournament
- 2020 NCAA Division II women's basketball tournament
- 2020 NCAA Division III women's basketball tournament
- 2020 NAIA Division II women's basketball tournament
