= Vito Fabris =

Italian basketball player (1954–2021)

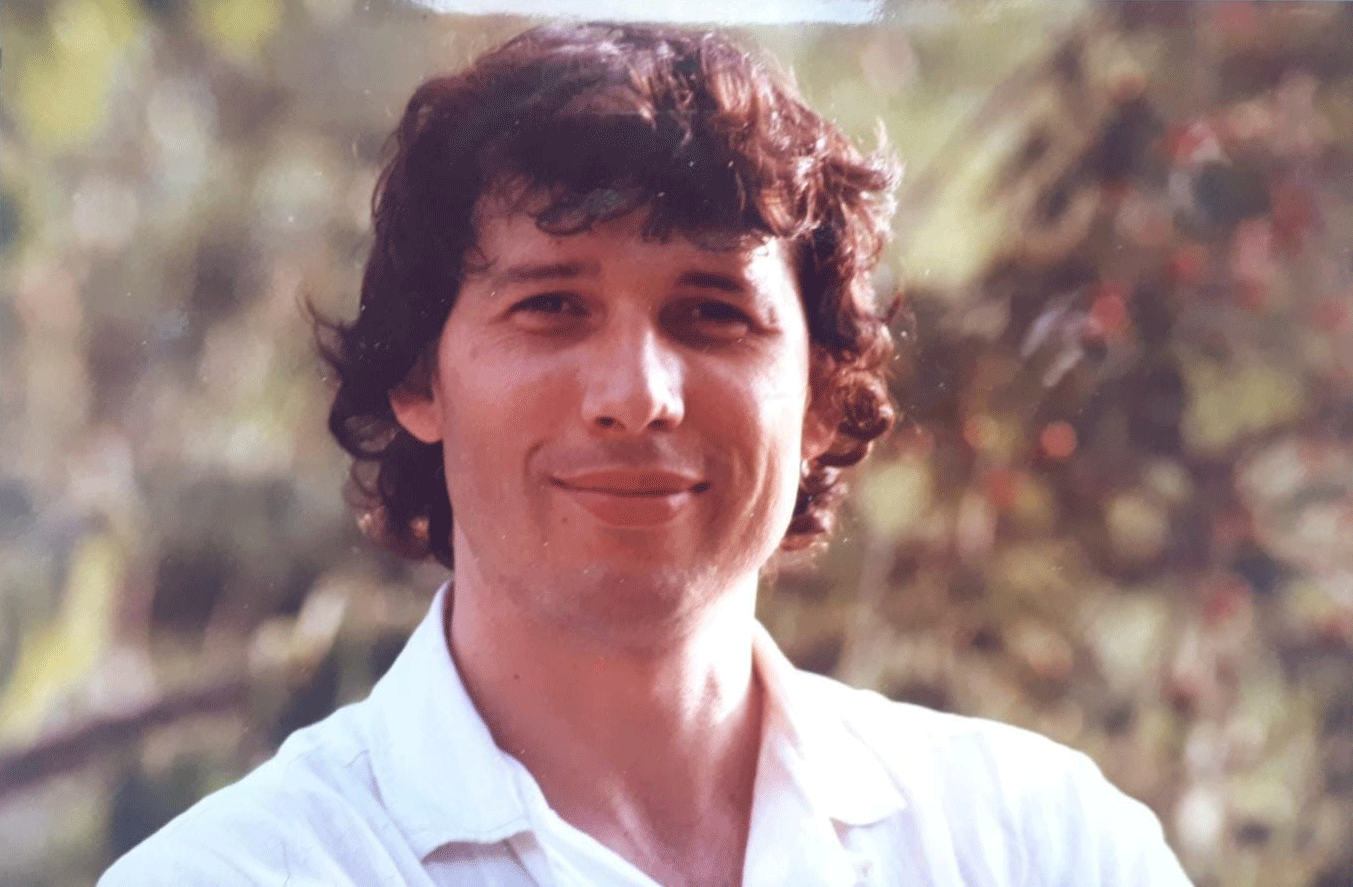

Personal information
- Born: 20 September 1954 Santa Sofia, Emilia–Romagna, Italy
- Died: 21 April 2021 (aged 66)
- Listed height: 196 cm (6 ft 5 in)

Career information
- Playing career: 1971–1987

Career history
- 1971–1979: Fulgor Libertas Forlì
- 1979–1983: Pallacanestro Firenze
- 1983–1985: Basket Mestre
- 1985–1987: Olimpia Pistoia

Vito Fabris (20 September 1954 – 10 April 2021) was an Italian basketball player. Nicknamed La Cavalla, he played several seasons in his native country, including in the top-tier Lega Basket Serie A.

== Death ==
Fabris died on 10 April 2021 while waiting on a heart transplant.
