= 2019–20 French Basketball Cup =

- Season: 2019–20
- Duration: 17 September 2020 – 25 April 2020 (cancelled March 2020)
- Teams: 66

The 2019–20 French Basketball Cup season (French: 2019–20 Coupe de France de Basket) was the 43rd season of the domestic cup competition of French basketball.The previous winner of the cup was ASVEL Villeurbanne. The competition started on 17 September 2020 and was cancelled in March 2020 due to the COVID-19 pandemic.

== See also ==
- 2019–20 Pro A season
