= Starwings Basel =

- Leagues: Swiss Basketball League
- Founded: 2002; 23 years ago
- Arena: Sporthalle Birsfelden
- Capacity: 2,000
- Location: Birsfelden, Switzerland
- President: Gaby Weis
- Head coach: Pascal Heinrichs
- Website: Official Website
Home	Away

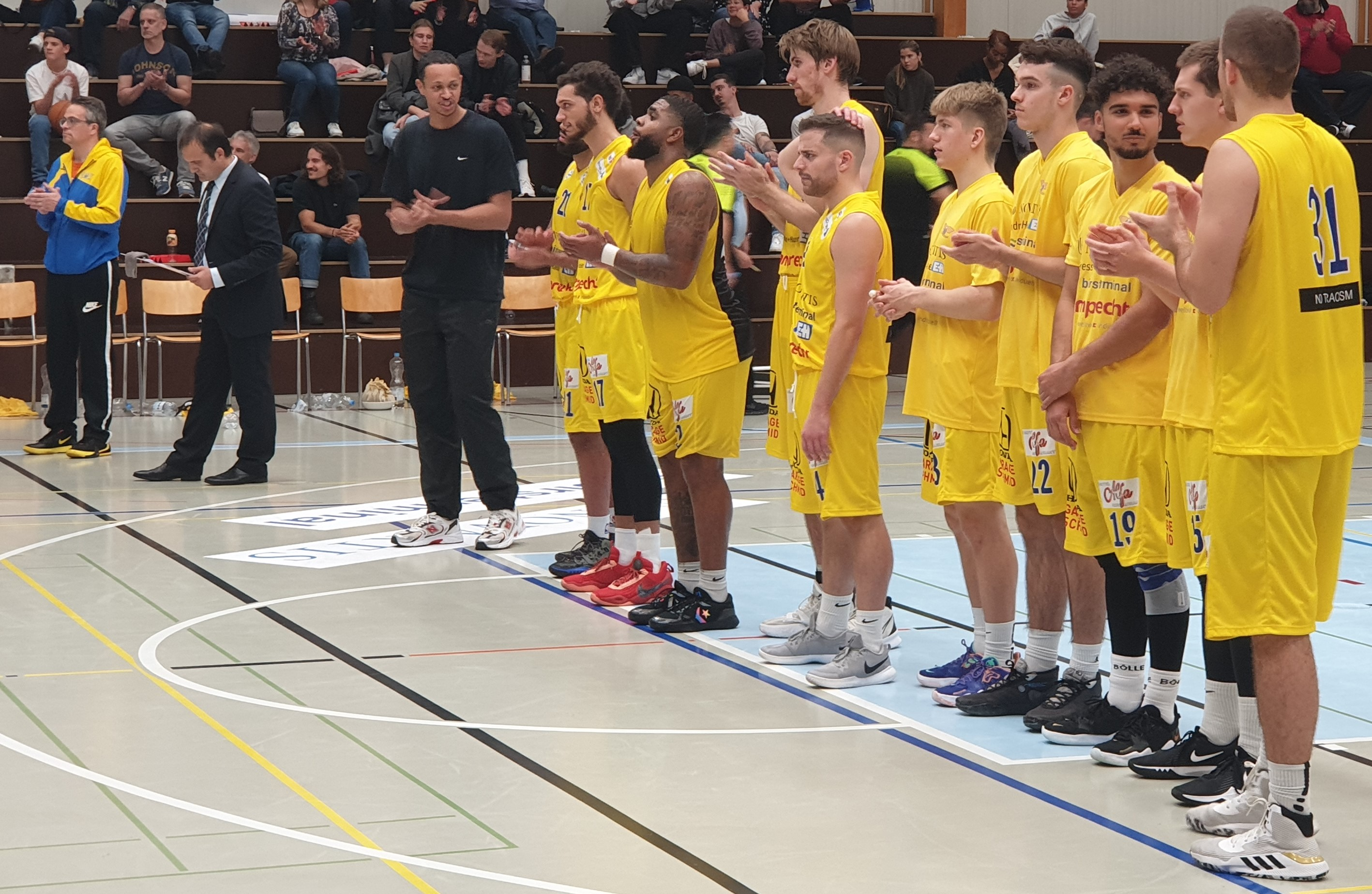
Starwings Basel October 2021.

Sporthalle Birsfelden

Starwings Basel, commonly known as Starwings, is a Swiss professional basketball club based in Basel. The club competes in the Swiss Basketball League (SBL), the highest tier of basketball in Switzerland.

Its main accomplishment to date was the win of the Swiss Cup, in 2010. Eleven years later, in 2021, Starwings reached the finals of the Swiss League.

The Starwings are currently the only professional basketball team from German-speaking Switzerland.

== History ==
The organization, which emerged from the two clubs BC Arlesheim and CVJM Birsfelden, was founded in 2002. Until their promotion, the Starwings Baskets played in the National League B, from 2005 in the National League A.

== Honours ==
Swiss Basketball League

- Runners-up (1): 2020–21

Swiss Cup

- Champions (1): 2010

== Current roster ==
Note: Flags indicate national team eligibility at FIBA-sanctioned events. Players may hold other non-FIBA nationalities not displayed.

Star Wings Basel roster
Players
Coaches

Pos.	No.	Nat.	Name
G	0	(United States)	Shawn Williams
G	2	(Nigeria)	TK Edogi
PG	4	(Switzerland)	Dennis Fasnacht
F	11	(Serbia)	Andrija Matic
F	13	(Switzerland)	Sebastien Davet
C	15	(United States)	Noah Dickerson
F/C	16	(Switzerland)	Louis Jeanrenaud
SG	17	(Switzerland)	Shayne Mccray
G/F	21	(Switzerland)	Vid Milenkovic
G	24	(France)	Marc Seylan
PG	27	(Ukraine)	Platon Pashkevich
F	31	(Switzerland)	Nik Milowitsch
F	44	(Croatia)	Nikola Vilotic
SF		(Switzerland)	Janis Pausa
F/C		(Switzerland)	Ilija Vranic
G		(Switzerland)	Zaid Weibel

Head coach

(Germany) Pascal Heinrichs

Assistant coach(es)

(Switzerland) Ilyas Tanglay

Legend

- (C) Team captain
- Injured

- Roster
Updated: 3 July 2023

== Notable players ==
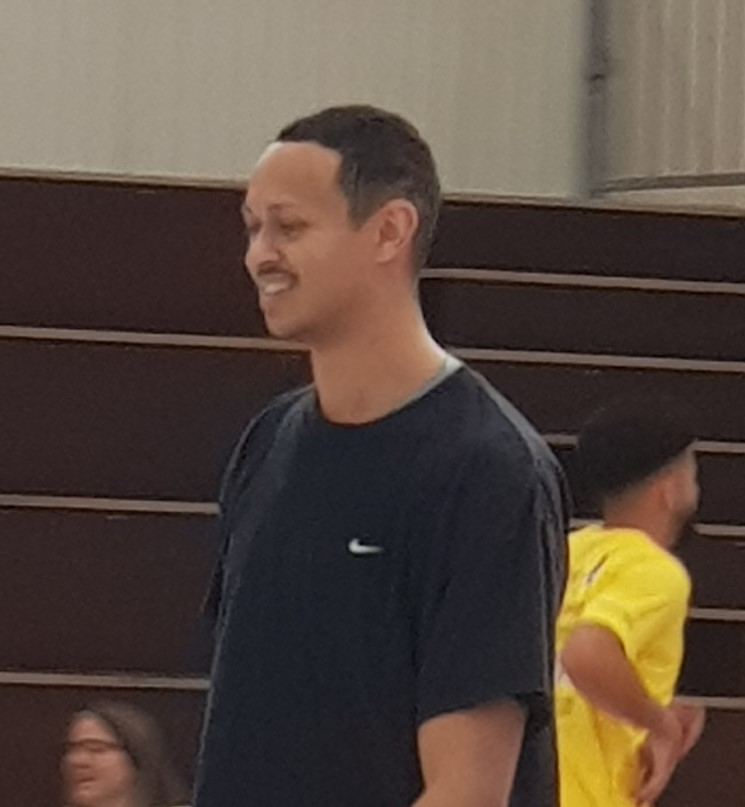
Dylan Schommer in October 2021.

- Set a club record or won an individual award as a professional player.
- Played at least one official international match for his senior national team at any time.

- (Switzerland) Roman Albrecht
- (Switzerland) Ahmad Allagholi
- (Switzerland) Joël Fuchs
- (Switzerland) Ilija Vranic
- (Lithuania) Povilas Čukinas
- (Senegal) Cheikh Sane
- (Switzerland) Nemanja Calasan
- (United States) Deondre Burns
- (United States Virgin Islands) Romani Hansen

== Head coaches ==
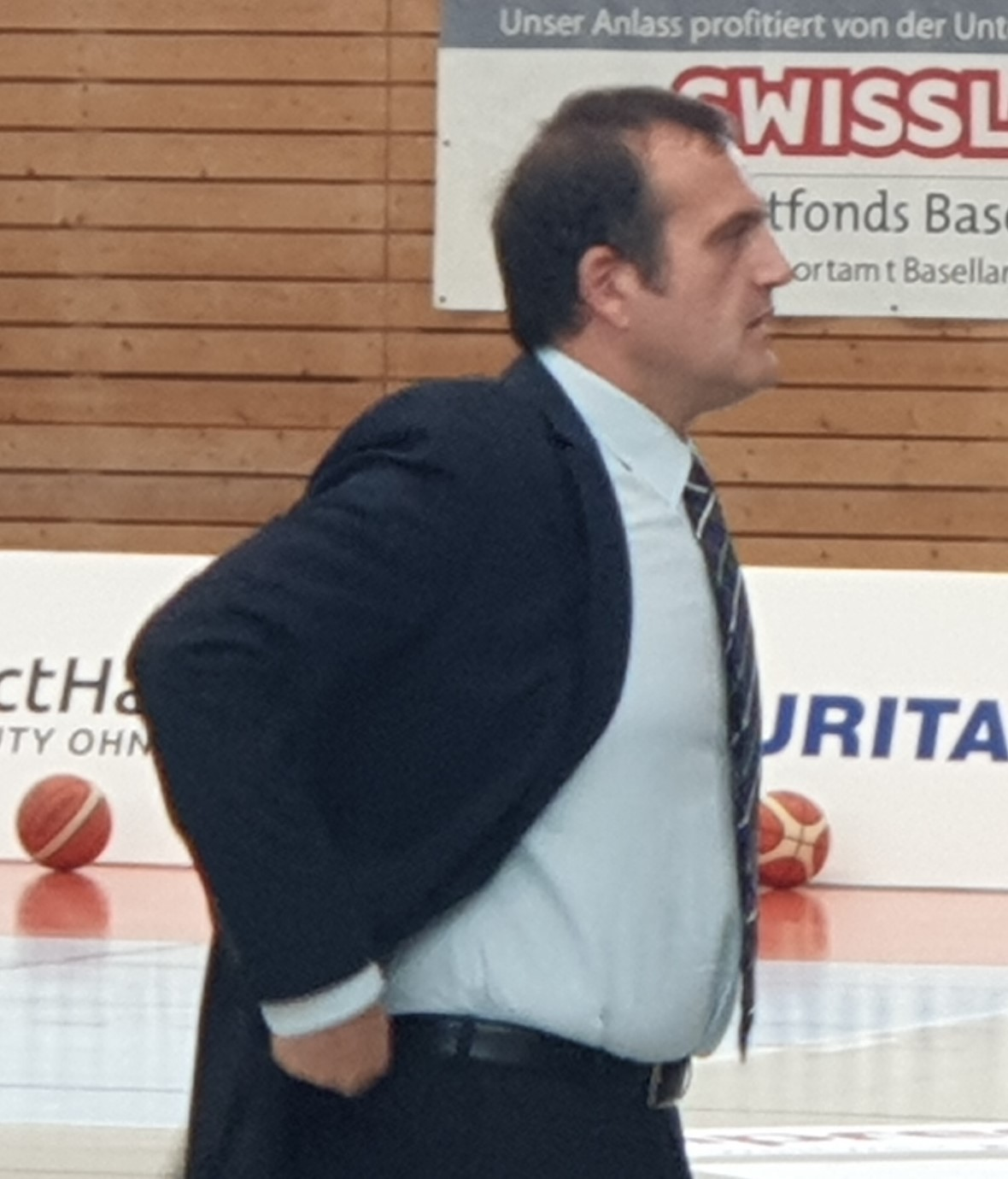
Dragan Andrejevic in October 2021.

- (Switzerland) (North Macedonia) Roland Pavloski: (2002–2003)
- (Switzerland) Pascal Donati: (2004–2009)
- (Switzerland) Patrick Koller: (2009–2010)
- (Switzerland) Danijel Eric: (2010–2012)
- (Switzerland) (North Macedonia) Roland Pavloski: (2012–2013)
- (Switzerland) (South Africa) Viktor Mettler: (2013–2014)
- (Switzerland) (North Macedonia) Roland Pavloski: (2014–2018)
- (Switzerland) (Serbia) Dragan Andrejevic: (2018–2022)
- (Greece) Antonios Doukas: (2022–2023)
- (Germany) Pascal Heinrichs: (2023–present)
