= Miguel López Abril =

Spanish basketball player (1954–2021)

Personal information
- Born: 20 December 1954 L'Hospitalet de Llobregat, Spain
- Died: 11 April 2021 (aged 66) Barcelona, Catalonia
- Listed height: 6 ft 1 in (1.85 m)

Career information
- Playing career: 1972–1985
- Position: Point guard

Career history

Playing
- 1972–1979: FC Barcelona Bàsquet
- 1979–1981: Bàsquet Manresa
- 1981–1983: Baloncesto Málaga
- 1983–1984: Club Joventut Badalona
- 1984–1985: Saski Baskonia

Coaching
- 1985–1986: Basquet Club Gramenet
- 1987–1988: Club Natació Sabadell
- 2004–2006: AB Castelló
- 2007–2009: Unió Bàsquet Sabadell

Miguel López Abril (20 December 1954 – 11 April 2021) was a Spanish basketball player who played point guard for FC Barcelona Bàsquet from 1972 to 1979.
