= Ed Wild =

Canadian basketball player (1935–2020)

Personal information
- Full name: Leonard Edwin Wild
- Nationality: Canadian
- Born: 22 January 1935; Vancouver, British Columbia, Canada
- Died: 10 July 2020 (aged 85); British Columbia, Canada

Sport
- Sport: Basketball

Leonard Edwin Wild (22 January 1935 – 10 July 2020) was a Canadian basketball player. He competed in the men's tournament at the 1956 Summer Olympics.
