= 2020 NCAA Division II men's basketball tournament =

- Teams: 64
- Finals site: Finals: State Farm Arena, Atlanta, Georgia; Elite Eight and Semifinals: Ford Center, Evansville, Indiana
- Champions: None
- Runner-up: None
- Semifinalists: None; None

The 2020 NCAA Division II men's basketball tournament was to be the annual single-elimination tournament to determine the national champion of men's NCAA Division II college basketball in the United States. With a field of sixty-four teams, it was supposed to begin on March 16 and conclude with the championship game on April 5.

As with the prior year's format, the eight regional winners would have met in the Elite Eight for the quarterfinal, semifinal, and championship rounds. The quarterfinal and semifinal rounds were scheduled to take place again at the Ford Center in Evansville, Indiana, while the championship final was due to take place at State Farm Arena in Atlanta, Georgia so as to coincide with the Division I Final Four.

After the announcement of the tournament field on March 8, the entire tournament was cancelled on March 12 due to the ongoing coronavirus pandemic.

== Qualification ==
A total of sixty-four bids were available for the tournament: 21 automatic bids (awarded to the champions of the twenty-one Division II conferences) and 41 at-large bids.

The bids are allocated evenly among the eight NCAA-designated regions (Atlantic, Central, East, Midwest, South, South Central, Southeast, and West), each of which contains either two or three of the twenty-three Division II conferences that sponsor men's basketball (after the Heartland Conference disbanded in 2019, the South Region now features only two conferences). Each region consists of two or three automatic qualifiers (the teams who won their respective conference tournaments) and either five or six at-large bids, awarded regardless of conference affiliation.

== Regionals ==
=== Atlantic ===
~~First round~~ Round of 64; March 13
1	Indiana (PA) (28–2)
8	Winston-Salem State (19–10)
5	Fairmont State (23–7)
4	Shippensburg (24–7)
Indiana, PA
3	Charleston (WV) (25–6)
6	Mercyhurst (20–8)
7	Virginia State (19–9)
2	West Liberty (27–4)

~~Regional semifinal~~ Round of 32; March 14

~~Regional Final~~; Sweet 16; March 16

* – Denotes overtime period

=== Central ===
~~First round~~ Round of 64; March 14
1	NW Missouri State (31–1)
8	Oklahoma Baptist (22–9)
5	Missouri Southern (23–7)
4	Northern State (26–6)
Maryville, MO
3	Southeastern Oklahoma (23–8)
6	Rogers State (24–6)
7	Henderson State (23–8)
2	Southern Nazarene (24–8)

~~Regional semifinal~~ Round of 32; March 15

~~Regional Final~~; Sweet 16; March 17

* – Denotes overtime period

=== East ===
~~First round~~ Round of 64; March 14
1	Bridgeport (24–4)
8	Daemen (24–8)
5	Le Moyne (19–9)
4	Saint Anselm (21–8)
Bridgeport, CT
3	Jefferson (27–4)
6	Stonehill (18–11)
7	Dominican (25–6)
2	Saint Thomas Aquinas (25–5)

~~Regional semifinal~~ Round of 32; March 15

~~Regional Final~~; Sweet 16; March 17

* – Denotes overtime period

=== Midwest ===
~~First round~~ Round of 64; March 14
1	Indianapolis (24–6)
8	Walsh (25–6)
5	Bellarmine (20–8)
4	Michigan Tech (23–8)
Indianapolis, IN
3	UMSL (27–6)
6	Southern Indiana (22–8)
7	Ferris State (27–6)
2	Truman (23–8)

~~Regional semifinal~~ Round of 32; March 15

~~Regional Final~~; Sweet 16; March 17

=== South ===
~~First round~~ Round of 64; March 14
1	Florida Southern (29–2)
8	Miles (24–4)
5	Lee (22–7)
4	Alabama–Huntsville (26–5)
Lakeland, FL
3	Valdosta State (26–4)
6	Palm Beach Atlantic (21–9)
7	Embry–Riddle (FL) (20–10)
2	Nova Southeastern (23–6)

~~Regional semifinal~~ Round of 32; March 15

~~Regional Final~~; Sweet 16; March 17

=== Southeast ===
~~First round~~ Round of 64; March 14
1	Lincoln Memorial (32–1)
8	Belmont Abbey (21–10)
5	Lander (23–8)
4	Augusta (21–8)
Harrogate, TN
3	UNC Pembroke (24–6)
6	Catawba (20–10)
7	Southern Wesleyan (20–11)
2	Queens (NC) (24–7)

~~Regional semifinal~~ Round of 32; March 15

~~Regional Final~~; Sweet 16; March 17

* – Denotes overtime period

=== South Central ===
~~First round~~ Round of 64; March 14
1	West Texas A&M (32–1)
8	Colorado Mesa (21–10)
5	Texas A&M–Kingsville (21–9)
4	Angelo State (20–8)
Canyon, TX
3	Dixie State (23–7)
6	Colorado Mines (21–10)
7	Dallas Baptist (21–9)
2	St. Edward's (27–4)

~~Regional semifinal~~ Round of 32; March 15

~~Regional Final~~; Sweet 16; March 17

=== West ===
~~First round~~ Round of 64; March 13
1	UC San Diego (30–1)
8	Western Washington (20–10)
5	Seattle Pacific (22–7)
4	Chico State (23–7)
San Diego, CA
3	Cal Poly Pomona (23–7)
6	Point Loma Nazarene (24–6)
7	CSU San Bernardino (21–8)
2	Azusa Pacific (25–4)

~~Regional semifinal~~ Round of 32; March 14

~~Regional Final~~; Sweet 16; March 16

== See also ==
- 2020 NCAA Division II women's basketball tournament
- 2020 NCAA Division I men's basketball tournament
- 2020 NCAA Division III men's basketball tournament
- 2020 NAIA Division I men's basketball tournament
- 2020 NAIA Division II men's basketball tournament
