= Masatomo Taniguchi =

Japanese basketball player (1946–2021)

Personal information
- Nationality: Japanese
- Born: 6 February 1946; Tokyo, Japan
- Died: 3 May 2021 (aged 75); Toride, Japan

Sport
- Sport: Basketball

Masatomo Taniguchi (谷口 正朋, Taniguchi Masamoto; 6 February 1946 – 3 May 2021) was a Japanese basketball player. He competed in the men's tournament at the 1972 Summer Olympics.

He died on 3 May 2021 in Toride from pancreatic cancer.
