= Nélson Lisboa =

Brazilian basketball player (1930–2020)

Personal information
- Born: 17 April 1930; Belo Horizonte, Brazil
- Died: 30 October 2020 (aged 90)

Sport
- Sport: Basketball

Nélson Couto e Silva Marques Lisboa, commonly known as Nélson Couto (17 April 1930 – 30 October 2020), was a Brazilian basketball player. He competed in the men's tournament at the 1956 Summer Olympics.
