= 2021 NAIA women's basketball tournament =

- Teams: 48
- Finals site: Tyson Events Center, Sioux City, Iowa
- Champions: Westmont Warriors (2nd title, 3rd title game, 4th Fab Four)
- Runner-up: Thomas More Saints (1st title game, 1st Fab Four)
- Semifinalists: Indiana Wesleyan Wildcats (1st Fab Four); Morningside Mustangs (1st Fab Four)
- Coach of the year: Kirsten Moore (Westmont)
- Player of the year: Stefanie Berberabe (Westmont)
- Charles Stevenson Hustle Award: Lauren Tsuneishi (Westmont)
- Chuck Taylor MVP: Stefanie Berberabe (Westmont)
- Top scorer: Stefanie Berberabe (Westmont) (14 points)

The 2021 NAIA women's basketball tournament was the tournament held by the NAIA to determine the national champion of women's college basketball among its member programs in the United States and Canada, culminating the 2020–21 basketball season.

This was the first tournament after the NAIA consolidated its basketball membership back into a single division, eliminating the separate championships that existed for its Divisions I and II from 1992 to 2020.

Westmont defeated Thomas More in the championship game, 72–61, the Warriors' second NAIA national title.

The tournament was played at the Tyson Events Center in Sioux City, Iowa.

== Qualification ==
After the merger of the two NAIA divisional tournaments back into a single event, the field of the combined event was set to forty-eight teams.

The tournament continued to utilize a simple single-elimination format. The first two preliminary rounds were played on regional campus sites while all subsequent rounds were played at the final tournament site in Sioux City.

== See also ==
- 2021 NAIA men's basketball tournament
- 2021 NCAA Division I women's basketball tournament
- 2021 NCAA Division II women's basketball tournament
- 2021 NCAA Division III women's basketball tournament
