= 2020–21 Swiss Basketball League =

Swiss basketball league season

Swiss Basketball League
- Teams: 9

Finals
- Champions: Fribourg Olympic; 19th title
- Runners-up: Starwings

The 2020–21 Swiss Basketball League (SBL) season was the 90th season of the top tier basketball league in Switzerland.

Fribourg Olympic won its third title in a row and its 19th total title, after defeating eight-seeded Starwings in the finals of the playoffs.

== Teams ==
The league was reduced from 12 to 9 teams, after Riviera Lakers were refused a license to compete and Swiss Central and Pully-Lausanne Foxes requested to step down to Ligue B.

Clubs of the 2020–21 SBL season

Team	Location
Boncourt	Boncourt
Fribourg Olympic	Fribourg
Lions de Genève	Le Grand-Saconnex/Geneva
Lugano Tigers	Lugano
Monthey-Chablais	Monthey
Nyon	Nyon
Spinelli Massagno	Cadempino/Massagno
Starwings	Birsfelden/Basel
Union Neuchâtel	Neuchâtel

== Regular season ==
=== League table ===
Pos	Team	Pld	W	L	PF	PA	PD	Pts	Qualification
1	Lions de Genève	24	21	3	2045	1649	+396	42	Advance to Playoffs
2	Fribourg Olympic (C, O)	24	19	5	2135	1694	+441	38	Advance to Playoffs
3	Spinelli Massagno	24	18	6	2052	1838	+214	36	Advance to Playoffs
4	Union Neuchâtel	24	14	10	1829	1851	−22	28	Advance to Playoffs
5	Monthey-Chablais	24	10	14	1784	1908	−124	20	Advance to Playoffs
6	Lugano Tigers	24	9	15	1941	2069	−128	18	Advance to Playoffs
7	Boncourt	24	8	16	1947	2065	−118	16	Advance to Playoffs
8	Starwings	24	7	17	1733	1917	−184	14	Advance to Playoffs
9	Nyon	24	2	22	1658	2133	−475	4	

Source: Swiss Basketball
(C) Champions; (O) Play-off winners

=== Results ===
Home \ Away	BON	FRI	GEN	LUG	MON	NYO	MAS	BAS	NEU
Boncourt	—	81–88		77–110		97–77	73–90	87–69	78–80
Fribourg Olympic	104–78	—			100–69		90–92	91–56	
Lions de Genève	96–87	70–63	—	96–59				73–57	
Lugano Tigers		65–74	73–88	—	66–48			76–69	71–83
Monthey-Chablais	85–81		48–89		—	106–81	75–87		
Nyon	75–94	55–82	44–91	77–95	75–94	—			
Spinelli Massagno		87–86	95–84	92–67			—		80–69
Starwings Basel			78–86	90–73	60–76	76–48	73–91	—	
Union Neuchâtel		59–68			73–54	76–69		78–71	—

Updated to match(es) played on 30 December 2020. Source: Swiss Basketball
Legend: Blue = home team win; Red = away team win.

== Swiss clubs in European competitions ==
Team	Competition	Progress
Fribourg Olympic	Champions League	First qualifying round
Fribourg Olympic	FIBA Europe Cup	Regular season

== Playoffs ==
Quarterfinals
1	Lions de Genève	1
8	Starwings	2
4	Union Neuchatêl	2
5	Monthey-Chablais	1
2	Fribourg Olympic	2
7	Boncourt	0
3	Spinelli Massagno	2
6	Lugano Tigers	0

Semifinals
8	Starwings	2
4	Union Neuchatêl	0
2	Fribourg Olympic	2
3	Spinelli Massagno	0

Finals
8	Starwings	0
2	Fribourg Olympic	3
