= 2021 NAIA men's basketball tournament =

- Teams: 48
- Finals site: Municipal Auditorium; Kansas City, Missouri
- Champions: Shawnee State (Ohio) (1 title, 1 title game, 1 Fab Four)
- Runner-up: Lewis–Clark State (Idaho) (1 title game, 1 Fab Four)
- Semifinalists: SAGU (Texas); Saint Francis (Ind.)
- Coach of the year: Delano Thomas (Shawnee State)
- Charles Stevenson Hustle Award: Antwaan Cushingberry (Saint Francis (Ind.))
- Chuck Taylor MVP: James Jones (Shawnee State)
- Attendance: 0

The 2021 NAIA men's basketball tournament was held March 12–23 at Municipal Auditorium in Kansas City, Missouri. The 83rd annual NAIA basketball tournament featured 48 teams playing in a single-elimination format. The opening game round was played on March 12 and 13, producing 16 teams which got reseeded for the championship round. The National Championship Game was played on March 23.

== Awards and honors ==
- Frank Cramer Award: David Block, Block & Co.
- Dr. James Naismith-Emil S. Liston Sportsmanship Award: Loyola (La.)
- 2021 All-Tournament Team: TreVion Crews, Bethel (Ind.); Mason Walters, Jamestown (N.D.); Damek Mitchell, Lewis-Clark State (Idaho); Trystan Bradley, Lewis-Clark State (Idaho); Hodges Bailey, Lewis-Clark State (Idaho); Zach Wrightsil, Loyola (La.); Joel Polius, SAGU (Texas); Antwaan Cushingberry, Saint Francis (Ind.); James Jones, Shawnee State (Ohio); EJ Onu, Shawnee State (Ohio)

== 2021 NAIA bracket ==
=== Opening round ===
==== Alexandria bracket ====
Game 1 March 12			Game 2 March 13
2	Talladega (Ala.)	77
3	LSU Alexandria	68	1	Loyola (La.)	78
			2	Talladega (Ala.)	55

Game 1 March 12			Game 2 March 13
			1	SAGU (Texas)	61
2	Cumberlands (Ky.)	59	3	Xavier (La.)	60
3	Xavier (La.)	67

==== Crestview Hills bracket ====
Game 1 March 12			Game 2 March 13
2	Rochester (Mich.)	72
3	WVU Tech (W. Va.)	85	1	Shawnee State (Ohio)	76
			3	WVU Tech (W. Va.)	70

Game 1 March 12			Game 2 March 13
			1	Morningside (Iowa)	64
2	Thomas More (Ky.)	68	2	Thomas More (Ky.)	55
3	Union (Ky.)	55

==== Lewiston bracket ====
Game 1			Game 2
2	Vanguard (Calif.)	75
3	Benedictine - Mesa (Ariz.)	78	1	Lewis–Clark State (Idaho)	98
			3	Benedictine - Mesa (Ariz.)	73

Game 1			Game 2
			1	Arizona Christian	79
2	Carroll (Mont.)	85	2	Carroll (Mont.)	83
3	Texas Wesleyan	58

==== Marion bracket ====
Game 1			Game 2
2	Olivet Nazarene (Ill.)	59
3	Indiana Tech	82	1	Marian (Ind.)	65
			3	Indiana Tech	58

Game 1			Game 2
			1	Indiana Wesleyan	95
2	IU South Bend (Ind.)	82	2	IU South Bend (Ind.)	76
3	Rio Grande (Ohio)	71

==== Montgomery bracket ====
Game 1			Game 2
2	Georgetown (Ky.)	56
3	Keiser (Fla.)	58	1	Stillman (Ala.)	72
			3	Keiser (Fla.)	64

Game 1			Game 2
			1	Faulkner (Ala.)	106
2	Warner (Fla.)	67	2	Warner (Fla.)	73
3	Tennessee Wesleyan	62

==== Omaha bracket ====
Game 1			Game 2
2	Texas A&M Texarkana	69
3	Bethel (Ind.)	73	1	Providence (Mont.)	81
			3	Bethel (Ind.)	85

Game 1			Game 2
			1	LSU Shreveport (La.)	75
2	Jamestown (N.D.)	86	2	Jamestown (N.D.)	87
3	Bellevue (Neb.)	69

==== Park City bracket ====
Game 1			Game 2
2	Oklahoma Wesleyan	93
3	Park (Mo.)	65	1	Science & Arts (Okla.)	73
			2	Oklahoma Wesleyan	100

Game 1			Game 2
			1	William Penn (Iowa)	85
2	Mid-America Christian (Okla.)	69	2	Mid-America Christian (Okla.)	75
3	Holy Cross (Ind.)	63

==== Wichita bracket ====
Game 1			Game 2
2	Benedictine (Kan.)	73
3	Central Baptist (Ark.)	61	1	Saint Francis (Ind.)	73
			2	Benedictine (Kan.)	65

Game 1			Game 2
			1	Northwestern (Iowa)	69
2	Bethel (Kan.)	82	2	Bethel (Kan.)	76
3	Voorhees (S.C.)	79

=== Championship bracket ===
Round of 16; March 18/19
1	Indiana Wesleyan	77
16	Bethel (Ind.)	83
Naismith Bracket
8	Stillman (Ala.)	67
9	Saint Francis (Ind.)	69
5	Shawnee State (Ohio)	69
12	Bethel (Kan.)	59
Cramer Bracket
4	Faulkner (Ala.)	83
13	Jamestown (N.D.)	88
3	Lewis–Clark State (Idaho)	86
14	Oklahoma Wesleyan	72
Duer Bracket
6	Marian (Ind.)	62
11	Loyola (La.)	69
7	SAGU (Texas)	90
10	Morningside (Iowa)	85
Liston Bracket
2	William Penn (Iowa)	62
15	Carroll (Mont.)	85

Quarterfinals; March 20
16	Bethel	81
9	Saint Francis	89
5	Shawnee State	76
13	Jamestown	65
3	Lewis–Clark State	75*
11	Loyola	70
7	SAGU	73
15	Carroll	65

Semifinals; March 22
9	Saint Francis	77
5	Shawnee State	82
3	Lewis–Clark State	83
7	SAGU	55

Championship; March 23
5	Shawnee State	74
3	Lewis–Clark State	68

== See also ==
- 2021 NAIA women's basketball tournament
- 2021 NCAA Division I men's basketball tournament
- 2021 NCAA Division II men's basketball tournament
- 2021 NCAA Division III men's basketball tournament
