= Shawnee State Bears =

- University: Shawnee State University
- Nickname: Bears
- NCAA: Division II
- Conference: MEC
- Athletic director: Gerald Cadogan
- Location: Portsmouth, Ohio
- Varsity teams: 20 (9 men's, 10 women's, 1 co-ed)
- Football stadium: Spartan Stadium (beginning in 2028)
- Basketball arena: Waller Gymnasium
- Baseball stadium: Branch Rickey Park
- Softball stadium: Boone Coleman Field
- Soccer stadium: Shawnee Turf
- Colors: Midnight Blue, Gray, and White
- Website: www.ssubears.com

The Shawnee State Bears are the athletic teams that represent Shawnee State University, located in Portsmouth, Ohio, in intercollegiate sports. They are a member of the NCAA Division II, primarily competing in the Mountain East Conference (MEC). The Bears previously joined the River States Conference in 2023 after 13 years in the Mid-South Conference (MSC). The Bears competed in the defunct American Mideast Conference (AMC) from 1991–92 to 2009–10; and as an NAIA Independent from 1986–87 (when the school began its athletics program and joined the NAIA) to 1990–91. In the 2026–27 academic year, the Shawnee State teams will join the Mountain East Conference (MEC) pending their acceptance into NCAA Division II.

The Shawnee State athletics program was established in 1986. The Bears have participated in 25 national championships and 17 conference championships in 7 of 11 sponsored sports.

== Varsity teams ==
Shawnee State competes in 20 intercollegiate varsity sports:

Men's sports	Women's sports
Baseball	Basketball
Basketball	Bowling
Bowling	Cross country
Cross country	Golf
Golf	Soccer
Soccer	Softball
Swimming	Swimming
Tennis	Tennis
Track and field^{1}	Track and field^{1}
	Volleyball
Co-ed sports
eSports
^{1} – includes both indoor and outdoor

They will add football in the 2027–28 academic year after they join the MEC.

== Club sports ==
Apart from the varsity teams, the university has a men's volleyball club.

== Accomplishments ==
The SSU women’s basketball team won the NAIA Division II National Championship on March 16, 1999, with an 80–65 win over the University of Saint Francis (Indiana).

The SSU men's basketball team won the NAIA National Championship on March 23, 2021, with an 74–68 win over the Lewis–Clark State College.

== National championships ==
=== NAIA ===
Sport	Titles	Competition	Winning years	Ref.
Basketball (men's)	1	National championship – Div. I	2021	
Basketball (women's)	1	National championship – Div. II	1999	

=== Other athletic highlights ===
- 1992 - softball team finishes 10th in NAIA National Tournament
- 1995 - softball team finishes 8th in NAIA National Tournament
- 1995 - women's basketball, NAIA National Tournament Final Four
- 1996 - softball team finishes as NAIA National Tournament Runners-up
- 1998 - softball team finishes 9th in NAIA National Tournament
- 1999 - women's basketball team won the NAIA Division II National Championship
- 2001 - softball team finishes 9th in NAIA National Tournament:
- 2008 - men's cross country team finishes 11th in NAIA National Championships:
- 2008 - women's cross country team finishes 13th in NAIA National Championships:
- 2021 - men's basketball team won the NAIA National Championship
