= NAIA Division II men's basketball championship =

Overview of college basketball tournaments

- Sport: College basketball
- Founded: 1992
- Folded: 2020
- No. of teams: 20 (1992–93); 24 (1994); 32 (1995–2019)
- Venues: Stephenville, Texas; Nampa, Idaho; Point Lookout, Missouri; Sioux Falls, South Dakota
- Most titles: Bethel (IN) (3); Cornerstone (3); Indiana Wesleyan (3); Oregon Tech (3)

The NAIA Division II men's basketball championship is the former tournament held by the National Association of Intercollegiate Athletics (NAIA) to determine the national champion of men's college basketball among its Division II members in the United States and Canada. The tournament was held annually from 1992 to 2019, after which the NAIA consolidated its two divisions, returning to the single national championship for men's and women's basketball that it held between the event's establishment in 1937 and the division split in 1992.

Over its twenty-eight year history, the tournament was played in four cities and at five venues. Unlike the NCAA's annual basketball tournaments, where games are played at an assortment of regional sites over the course of several weeks, all NAIA tournament games were played at a single, centralized arena.

Bethel (IN), Cornerstone, Indiana Wesleyan, and Oregon Tech won the most NAIA Division II national titles, with three each.

== Results ==
NAIA Division II men's basketball championship
| Year | Arena | Location | Championship | | | Semifinalists |
| Year | Arena | Location | Champion | Score | Runner-up | Semifinalists |
|---|---|---|---|---|---|---|
| 1992; Details | Wisdom Gym | Stephenville, Texas | Grace | 85–79 ^{OT} | Northwestern (IA) | Concordia (NE) & Dakota State |
| 1993; Details | Montgomery Fieldhouse | Nampa, Idaho | Willamette | 63–56 | Northern State (SD) | Northwest Nazarene & William Jewell |
| 1994; Details | Montgomery Fieldhouse | Nampa, Idaho | Eureka | 98–95 ^{OT} | Northern State (SD) | Lewis & Clark & Northwest Nazarene |
| 1995; Details | Montgomery Fieldhouse | Nampa, Idaho | Bethel (IN) | 103–95 ^{OT} | Northwest Nazarene | Northern State & William Jewell |
| 1996; Details | Montgomery Fieldhouse | Nampa, Idaho | Albertson | 81–72 ^{OT} | Whitworth | Walsh & William Jewell |
| 1997; Details | Montgomery Fieldhouse | Nampa, Idaho | Bethel (IN) (2) | 95–94 | Siena Heights | Tabor & William Jewell |
| 1998; Details | Idaho Center | Nampa, Idaho | Bethel (IN) (3) | 89–87 | Oregon Tech | Mount Marty & Northwest Nazarene |
| 1999; Details | Idaho Center | Nampa, Idaho | Cornerstone | 113–109 | Bethel (IN) | Berea & Mount Senario |
| 2000; Details | Keeter Gymnasium | Point Lookout, Missouri | Embry–Riddle (FL) | 75–63 | College of the Ozarks | Huntington & Siena Heights |
| 2001; Details | Keeter Gymnasium | Point Lookout, Missouri | Northwestern (IA) | 82–78 | MidAmerica Nazarene | Cornerstone & Rio Grande |
| 2002; Details | Keeter Gymnasium | Point Lookout, Missouri | Evangel | 84–61 | Robert Morris (IL) | Cornerstone & Northwestern (IA) |
| 2003; Details | Keeter Gymnasium | Point Lookout, Missouri | Northwestern (IA) (2) | 77–57 | Bethany (KS) | Cornerstone & Warner Southern |
| 2004; Details | Keeter Gymnasium | Point Lookout, Missouri | Oregon Tech | 81–72 | Bellevue | St. Ambrose & Sioux Falls |
| 2005; Details | Keeter Gymnasium | Point Lookout, Missouri | Walsh | 81–70 | Concordia (NE) | Cedarville & Oregon Tech |
| 2006; Details | Keeter Gymnasium | Point Lookout, Missouri | College of the Ozarks | 74–56 | Huntington | Lindenwood & MidAmerica Nazarene |
| 2007; Details | Keeter Gymnasium | Point Lookout, Missouri | MidAmerica Nazarene | 78–60 | Mayville State | Northwest & Northwestern (IA) |
| 2008; Details | Keeter Gymnasium | Point Lookout, Missouri | Oregon Tech (2) | 63–56 | Bellevue | MidAmerican Nazarene & Northwestern (IA) |
| 2009; Details | Keeter Gymnasium | Point Lookout, Missouri | Oklahoma Wesleyan | 60–53 | College of the Ozarks | Bethel (IN) & Black Hills State |
| 2010; Details | Keeter Gymnasium | Point Lookout, Missouri | Saint Francis (IN) | 67–66 | Walsh | Bellevue & Oklahoma Wesleyan |
| 2011; Details | Keeter Gymnasium | Point Lookout, Missouri | Cornerstone (2) | 80–71 | Saint Francis (IN) | College of the Ozarks & Northwood |
| 2012; Details | Keeter Gymnasium | Point Lookout, Missouri | Oregon Tech (3) | 63–46 | Northwood | Davenport & McPherson |
| 2013; Details | Keeter Gymnasium | Point Lookout, Missouri | Cardinal Stritch | 73–59 | William Penn | Indiana–Southeast & Grace |
| 2014; Details | Keeter Gymnasium | Point Lookout, Missouri | Indiana Wesleyan | 78–68 | Midland | Robert Morris (IL) & Southeastern (FL) |
| 2015; Details | Keeter Gymnasium | Point Lookout, Missouri | Cornerstone (3) | 66–45 | Dakota Wesleyan | Davenport & Embry-Riddle (FL) |
| 2016; Details | Keeter Gymnasium | Point Lookout, Missouri | Indiana Wesleyan (2) | 69–66 | Saint Francis (IN) | Indiana–East & Warner |
| 2017; Details | Keeter Gymnasium | Point Lookout, Missouri | Union (KY) | 72–69 | Cornerstone | Bellevue & Indiana Wesleyan |
| 2018; Details | Sanford Pentagon | Sioux Falls, South Dakota | Indiana Wesleyan (3) | 84–71 | Saint Francis (IN) | Indiana–East & College of Idaho |
| 2019; Details | Sanford Pentagon | Sioux Falls, South Dakota | Spring Arbor | 82–76 | Oregon Tech | College of Idaho & Marian |
| 2020; Details | Sanford Pentagon | Sioux Falls, South Dakota | Tournament cancelled in the middle of the first round due to the COVID-19 pandemic | | | |

== Champions ==
=== Active NAIA programs ===
| School | Titles | Years |
|---|---|---|
| Indiana Wesleyan | 3 | 2014, 2016, 2018 |
| Cornerstone | 3 | 1999, 2011, 2015 |
| Oregon Tech | 3 | 2004, 2008, 2012 |
| Bethel (IN) | 3 | 1995, 1997, 1998 |
| Northwestern (IA) | 2 | 2001, 2003 |
| Spring Arbor | 1 | 2019 |
| Saint Francis (IN) | 1 | 2010 |
| Oklahoma Wesleyan | 1 | 2009 |
| MidAmerica Nazarene | 1 | 2007 |
| College of the Ozarks | 1 | 2006 |
| Evangel | 1 | 2002 |
| College of Idaho | 1 | 1996 |
| Grace | 1 | 1992 |

=== Former NAIA programs ===
| School | Titles | Years |
|---|---|---|
| Union (TN) | 1 | 2017 |
| Cardinal Stritch | 1 | 2013 |
| Walsh | 1 | 2005 |
| Embry–Riddle | 1 | 2000 |
| Eureka | 1 | 1994 |
| Willamette | 1 | 1993 |

== See also ==
- NAIA men's basketball championship
- NAIA women's basketball championship
- NAIA Division II women's basketball championship
- NCAA Division I men's basketball tournament
- NCAA Division II men's basketball tournament
- NCAA Division III men's basketball tournament
