= Rollie Massimino =

American basketball coach (1934–2017)

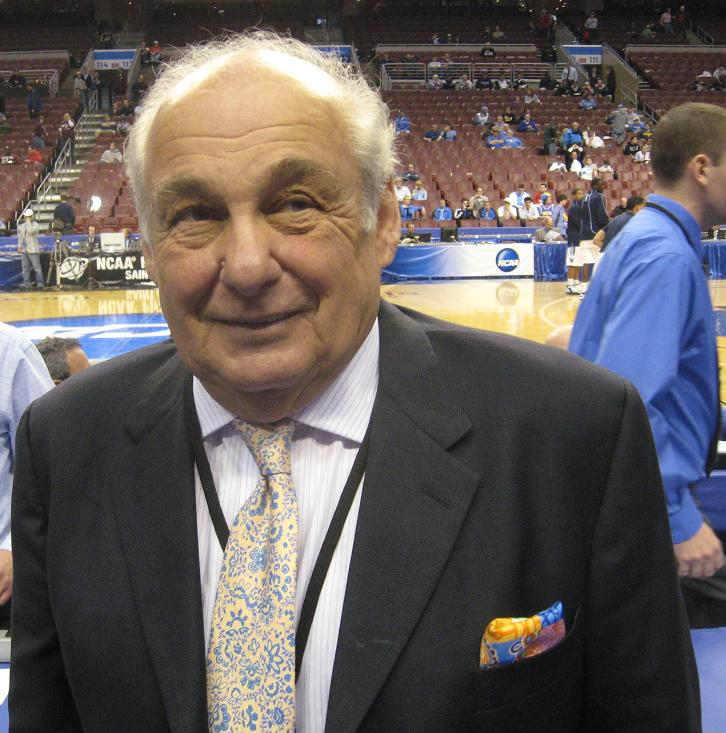
- Massimino in 2009

Biographical details
- Born: November 13, 1934; Hillside, New Jersey, U.S.
- Died: August 30, 2017 (aged 82); West Palm Beach, Florida, U.S.

Playing career
- 1953–1956: Vermont

Coaching career (HC unless noted)
- 1956–1959: Cranford HS (assistant)
- 1959–1963: Hillside HS
- 1963–1969: Lexington HS
- 1969–1971: Stony Brook
- 1972–1973: Penn (assistant)
- 1973–1992: Villanova
- 1992–1994: UNLV
- 1996–2003: Cleveland State
- 2006–2017: Northwood (FL) / Keiser

Head coaching record
- Overall: 816–462 (college); 160–61 (high school)
- Tournaments: 0–2 (NCAA College Division); 21–10 (NCAA Division I); 4–5 (NIT); 11–7 (NAIA Division II)

Accomplishments and honors

Championships
- NCAA Division I tournament (1985); NCAA Regional – Final Four (1985); 2 Eastern 8 tournament (1978, 1980); 3 Eastern 8 regular season (1978–1980); 2 Big East regular season (1982, 1983); 3 Sun Conference tournament (2010, 2012, 2014); 7 Sun Conference regular season (2007–2009, 2011–2013, 2016)

Awards
- 2× Eastern 8 Coach of the Year (1977, 1979); Big East Coach of the Year (1982)
- College Basketball Hall of Fame; Inducted in 2013

Roland Vincent Massimino (November 13, 1934 – August 30, 2017) was an American basketball coach. He served as the head men's basketball coach at Stony Brook University (1969–1971), Villanova University (1973–1992), the University of Nevada, Las Vegas (1992–1994), Cleveland State University (1996–2003), and at Northwood University's Florida campus, which was sold in 2015 to Keiser University (2006–2017). He reached the Elite Eight of the NCAA Tournament five times (all with Villanova) and reached the NAIA Semi-final twice.

At Villanova, he led his 1984–85 team to the NCAA championship. Entering the 1985 NCAA tournament as an eight seed, Villanova defeated their heavily favored Big East Conference foe, the Georgetown Hoyas, in the title game. It is widely regarded as one of the greatest upsets in NCAA history.

== Education ==
Roland Massimino graduated in 1952 from Hillside High School in Hillside, New Jersey. In 1956, he earned a bachelor's degree in education from the University of Vermont (UVM), where he played varsity basketball for three years. He earned a master's degree equivalent in health and physical education from Rutgers University in 1959. While he was a student at UVM, he became a member of the Alpha-Lambda chapter of Kappa Sigma fraternity.

== Coaching career ==
=== High school ===
After graduating from UVM, Massimino entered the coaching ranks, where he coached varsity baseball and freshman and JV basketball at Cranford High School in Cranford, New Jersey. In 1959, he began a four-year tenure as head varsity basketball coach at Hillside High School in Hillside, New Jersey, the town in which he had grown up. In his second year as head basketball coach at Hillside, he led his team to the finals of the State Group III Championship. They lost a tightly contested final game to Burlington High School from Burlington, New Jersey. The Hillside team was led by Frank Checorski, a unanimous Top-Five All-State Selection throughout The Garden State.

In 1963, with the support of high school All-American Bill Schutsky—who later captained the Army Cadets basketball team—Massimino led the Comets to the state Group IV finals. In both seasons, Hillside was defeated in the final playoff game by Newark's Central High School. The Comets lost during both years to a team composed of taller players, despite pushing the thrilling 1963 championship game into double-overtime.

For the 1963–64 season, Massimino moved to Lexington High School in Massachusetts. In 1965, he led the Lexington squad to a state championship and later led another to a 20–1 record. Along the way, Massimino was laying the foundation for an elite scholastic program which later dominated the Middlesex League, winning state titles in 1971, 1972, and 1978 along with league championships in 16 of the past 30 years.

In ten seasons as a high school coach, Massimino compiled a 160–61 record.

=== College ===
Massimino's collegiate debut came in 1969 as head coach of Stony Brook University. In his first season the Patriots (now Seawolves) won the conference championship after going 19–6, earning a berth in the NCAA small college tournament. Massimino's next stop was as an assistant coach under Chuck Daly at the University of Pennsylvania.

Massimino left Penn in March 1973, succeeding Jack Kraft as head coach of Villanova and leading the 1984-85 Wildcats team to one of the greatest upsets in NCAA tournament history by knocking off top-seeded Georgetown University (Washington, D.C.) in the 1985 NCAA Tournament Championship Game. The road to the finals proved an even greater challenge, kicking off with a win on #9-seed Dayton's home court, followed by victories over #1-seed Michigan, #4-seed Maryland, #2-seed North Carolina, before culminating in a Final Four victory over #2-seeded Memphis State.

After Villanova's unexpected championship run, Massimino was offered the head coaching position of the NBA's New Jersey Nets. At the last minute, he declined the offer and decided to stay at Villanova and devote more time to his family.

After a few subpar years, Massimino left Villanova in 1992 to assume the head coaching job at UNLV. The initial hope was that he could restore the success and credibility of the UNLV program after the basketball team's 1991–92 probation and the forced resignation of long-time coach Jerry Tarkanian. Two years later, Massimino was himself forced out when it was revealed that he and UNLV president Robert Maxson had cut a side deal to lift Massimino's salary above the figure being reported to the state of Nevada and the state commission ruled that this had violated both state ethics laws, as well as UNLV rules.

Moving on to Cleveland State University in 1996, Massimino's teams recorded a 90–113 record in his seven seasons as coach. Massimino's contract was bought out following a series of off-court issues. These included several players with drug and alcohol problems, other players arrested for serious crimes, and allegations of academic fraud.

Massimino was the head coach of the men's basketball team at Keiser University in West Palm Beach, Florida, members of the National Association of Intercollegiate Athletics (NAIA). Massimino continued his role as coach when Northwood University sold its Florida campus to Keiser University. The 2005–06 Northwood team coached by Massimino was its inaugural season in The Sun Conference. In his first four seasons with the Seahawks, Massimino led Northwood to three FSC regular-season titles, four appearances in the NAIA National tournament, and the Seahawks reached the Elite Eight in 2008. Massimino and the Seahawks received bids to the NAIA tournament in eight seasons as Northwood, and once as Keiser, with the team's best finishes being the national semifinals in 2011 and a national runner-up finish in 2012. Massimino's overall record at Northwood/Keiser stands at 298–75 (.799 winning percentage).

On November 1, 2012, Massimino returned to Rupp Arena in Lexington, Kentucky for the first time since his 1985 championship triumph, playing a preseason exhibition game against reigning NCAA Division I champions Kentucky. The game was played at the request of Massimino after indicating to Kentucky head coach John Calipari that the 2012–13 season could be his last in coaching. In a later interview, Massimino hedged somewhat, saying, "I don't know if it's my last [season]. I hope I can go another year or so." Kentucky introduced Massimino with a video montage of the final minutes of Villanova's 1985 victory.

On December 14, 2016, Massimino, at 82 years old, reached coaching win number 800 when Keiser University defeated Trinity Baptist 77–47.

Fox Sports released a 2018 television documentary titled The Maestro: The Rollie Massimino Story, written and directed by Bill Raftery, which chronicles Massimino's final season (2016–17) coaching Keiser University. Massimino coached the season, against his doctors' recommendation, while battling terminal cancer.

== Death ==
Massimino was diagnosed with terminal lung cancer and brain cancer in April 2016 and given one year to live. Coincidentally, he was at NRG Stadium in Houston in April 2016 to see Villanova win the NCAA tournament. Massimino died sixteen months later on August 30, 2017. To honor Massimino's memory, Villanova wore throwback uniforms throughout the 2017–18 season in the style of those the Wildcats did during their 1984–85 championship season, and would go on to win their second national championship in three seasons that year.

== Head coaching record ==
Record table
Season	Team	Overall	Conference	Standing	Postseason
Stony Brook Patriots (Knickerbocker Conference) (1969–1971)
1969–70	Stony Brook	19–4	8–0	1st	NCAA College Division first round
1970–71	Stony Brook	15–10	7–2	2nd	
Stony Brook:		34–14 (.708)	15–2 (.882)		
Villanova Wildcats (NCAA Division I independent) (1973–1976)
1973–74	Villanova	7–19			
1974–75	Villanova	9–18			
1975–76	Villanova	16–11			
Villanova Wildcats (Eastern Collegiate Basketball League / Eastern Athletic Association) (1976–1980)
1976–77	Villanova	23–10	6–1	2nd (East)	NIT Third Place
1977–78	Villanova	23–9	7–3	T–1st (East)	NCAA Division I Elite Eight
1978–79	Villanova	13–13	9–1	1st (East)	
1979–80	Villanova	23–8	7–3	T–1st (East)	NCAA Division I second round
Villanova Wildcats (Big East Conference) (1980–1992)
1980–81	Villanova	20–11	8–6	T–3rd	NCAA Division I second round
1981–82	Villanova	22–8	11–3	1st	NCAA Division I Elite Eight
1982–83	Villanova	24–8	12–4	T–1st	NCAA Division I Elite Eight
1983–84	Villanova	19–12	12–4	T–2nd	NCAA Division I second round
1984–85	Villanova	25–10	9–7	T–3rd	NCAA Division I champions
1985–86	Villanova	23–14	10–6	4th	NCAA Division I second round
1986–87	Villanova	15–16	6–10	6th	
1987–88	Villanova	24–13	9–7	T–3rd	NCAA Division I Elite Eight
1988–89	Villanova	18–16	7–9	T–5th	NIT quarterfinal
1989–90	Villanova	18–15	8–8	T–5th	NCAA Division I first round
1990–91	Villanova	17–15	7–9	T–7th	NCAA Division I second round
1991–92	Villanova	14–15	11–7	4th	NIT first round
Villanova:		355–241 (.596)	139–88 (.612)		
UNLV Runnin' Rebels (Big West Conference) (1992–1994)
1992–93	UNLV	21–8	13–5	2nd	NIT first round
1993–94	UNLV	15–13	10–8	T–5th	
UNLV:		36–21 (.632)	23–13 (.639)		
Cleveland State Vikings (Midwestern Collegiate Conference / Horizon League) (1996–2003)
1996–97	Cleveland State	9–19	6–10	T–6th	
1997–98	Cleveland State	12–15	6–8	T–5th	
1998–99	Cleveland State	14–14	6–8	5th	
1999–00	Cleveland State	16–14	9–5	2nd	
2000–01	Cleveland State	19–13	9–5	3rd	
2001–02	Cleveland State	12–16	6–10	7th	
2002–03	Cleveland State	8–22	3–13	9th	
Cleveland State:		90–113 (.443)	51–67 (.432)		
Northwood/Keiser Seahawks (Florida Sun Conference / Sun Conference) (2006–2017)
2006–07	Northwood	23–9	9–3	1st	NAIA Division II first round
2007–08	Northwood	27–8	12–2	1st	NAIA Division II quarterfinal
2008–09	Northwood	27–6	11–3	1st	NAIA Division II second round
2009–10	Northwood	27–7	12–4	2nd	NAIA Division II first round
2010–11	Northwood	33–4	16–0	1st	NAIA Division II semifinal
2011–12	Northwood	34–4	14–2	T–1st	NAIA Division II Runner-up
2012–13	Northwood	30–4	14–2	1st	NAIA Division II first round
2013–14	Northwood	26–7	14–4	T–2nd	NAIA Division II first round
2014–15	Northwood	18–12	10–8	T–3rd	
2015–16	Keiser	30–5	14–2	1st	NAIA Division II quarterfinal
2016–17	Keiser	23–9	9–7	4th	
Northwood/Keiser:		298–75 (.799)	135–37 (.785)		
Total:		816–462 (.638)			
National champion Postseason invitational champion Conference regular season champion Conference regular season and conference tournament champion Division regular season champion Division regular season and conference tournament champion Conference tournament champion

== See also ==
- List of college men's basketball coaches with 600 wins
- List of NCAA Division I Men's Final Four appearances by coach
