= 2016 NAIA Division II men's basketball tournament =

College basketball tournament

- Logo for the 2016 National Championship
- Teams: 32
- Finals site: Keeter Gymnasium, Point Lookout, Missouri
- Champions: Indiana Wesleyan Wildcats (2nd title, 2nd title game, 2nd Fab Four)
- Runner-up: Saint Francis Cougars (3rd title game, 3rd Fab Four)
- Semifinalists: IU East Red Wolves (1st Fab Four); Davenport Panthers (3rd Fab Four)
- Charles Stevenson Hustle Award: Vasha Davis (IU East)
- Chuck Taylor MVP: Jonny Marlin (Indiana Wesleyan)
- Top scorer: Warren Hall (Warner) (61 points)

The 2016 NAIA Division II Men’s Basketball national championship was held in March at Keeter Gymnasium in Point Lookout, Missouri. The 25th annual NAIA basketball tournament featured thirty-two teams playing in a single-elimination format. The championship game was won by the Indiana Wesleyan Wildcats of Marion, Indiana over the Saint Francis Cougars of Fort Wayne, Indiana by a score of 69 to 66.

== Championship game ==
Indiana Wesleyan won their second national championship in three years. This was the fourth meeting of the year between the Crossroads League rivals. Saint Francis won two regular season contests in addition to edging Indiana Wesleyan in the league's year-end tournament. In the NAIA championship, Saint Francis fell behind early, with the first half deficit reaching 13 points. With the lead still six points at half-time, Indiana Wesleyan held off the Cougars to win against the then-#1-team in the nation.

== Tourney awards and honors ==
=== Team award ===
- Dr. James Naismith/Emil Liston Team Sportsmanship Award: Dakota Wesleyan (SD)

=== Individual awards ===
- Most Outstanding Player: Jonny Marlin, Indiana Wesleyan
- Championship Hustle Award: Vasha Davis, IU East (IN)
- NABC/NAIA Division II Coach of the Year: Greg Tonagel, Indiana Wesleyan
- Rawlings-NAIA Division II National Coach of the Year: Chad LaCross, Saint Francis (IN)

=== 2016 NAIA Division II Men’s Basketball All-Championship Team ===
| Name | School |
|---|---|
| Jonny Marlin | Indiana Wesleyan |
| Bob Peters | Indiana Wesleyan |
| Lane Mahurin | Indiana Wesleyan |
| Kegan Comer | Saint Francis (IN) |
| Bryce Lienhoop | Saint Francis (IN) |
| Austin Fox | Saint Francis (IN) |
| Lucas Huffman | IU East (IN) |
| Kevin Rich | Davenport (MI) |
| Dominez Burnett | Davenport (MI) |
| Trae Bergh | Dakota Wesleyan (SD) |
| Kyle Steigenga | Cornerstone (MI) |

=== Statistical leaders ===
(minimum 4 games)

| Category | Player | School | Tally |
|---|---|---|---|
| Most points | Austin Fox | St. Francis (Ind) | 83 |
| Most points | Kegan Comer | St. Francis (Ind) | 83 |
| Most points per game | Dominez Burnett | Davenport | 20.25 |
| Leading rebounder | Austin Fox | St. Francis (Ind) | 51 |
| Leading rebounder per game | Austin Fox | St. Francis (Ind) | 10.2 |
| Most assists | Johnny Marlin | Indiana Wesleyan | 21 |
| Assists per game | Johnny Marlin | Indiana Wesleyan | 4.2 |
| Assist/Turnover ratio | Johnny Marlin | Indiana Wesleyan | 3.5 |
| Three-pointers made | Evan Henry | St. Francis (Ind) | 15 |
| Best overall field goal percentage | Austin Fox | St. Francis (Ind) | 54.8 (34-62) |
| Best 3-point field goal percentage | Kegan Comer | St. Francis (Ind) | 55.8% (10-17) |
| Best free throw percentage | Domonique Williams | IU East | 86.7% (13-15) |
| Most steals | Bob Peters | Indiana Wesleyan | 10 |
| Most steals per game | Bob Peters | Indiana Wesleyan | 2.0 |
| Most shots blocked | Bryce Lienhoop | St. Francis (Ind) | 10 |
| Most shots blocked per game | Bryce Lienhoop | St. Francis (Ind) | 2.0 |

== Bracket ==
First Round; March 9–10 | Second Round; March 11
1 | Saint Francis (IN) (29-4) | 96
8 | Dakota State (SD) (19-13) | 81
1 | Saint Francis (IN) (30-4) | 89
4 | Mount Mercy (IA) (26-7) | 82
4 | Mount Mercy (IA) (25-7) | 98*
5 | Southern Oregon (24-8) | 97
NAISMITH BRACKET
3 | Keiser (FL) (28-4) | 77
6 | Olivet Nazarene (IL) (18-10) | 66
3 | Keiser (FL) (29-4) | 93
2 | Cornerstone (MI) (27-6) | 79
2 | Cornerstone (MI) (26-6) | 87
7 | Cincinnati Christian (OH) (23-8) | 69
2 | Tabor (KS) (30-3) | 68
7 | IU East (IN) (19-13) | 91
7 | IU East (IN) (20-13) | 81
6 | Valley City State (ND) (22-10) | 69
3 | Tennessee Wesleyan (28-3) | 64
6 | Valley City State (ND) (21-10) | 65
CRAMER BRACKET
4 | Bethel (IN) (23-9) | 85
5 | Robert Morris (IL) (24-9) | 80
4 | Bethel (IN) (24-9) | 93
1 | Briar Cliff (IA) (31-3) | 100
1 | Briar Cliff (IA) (30-3) | 81
8 | Washington Adventist (MD) (16-12) | 61
1 | St. Francis (IL) (28-3) | 79
8 | York (NE) (23-9) | 83
8 | York (NE) (24-9) | 78
5 | Dakota Wesleyan (SD) (23-10) | 77
4 | Indiana Tech (23-9) | 89
5 | Dakota Wesleyan (SD) (22-10) | 93*
DUER BRACKET
3 | Northwest Christian (OR) (27-6) | 84
6 | Southwestern (KS) (26-7) | 69
3 | Northwest Christian (OR) (28-6) | 79
2 | Indiana Wesleyan (29-5) | 83
2 | Indiana Wesleyan (28-5) | 113
7 | Bellevue (NE) (20-11) | 81
2 | Union (KY) (28-6) | 70
7 | Cal Maritime (22-9) | 81
7 | Cal Maritime (23-9) | 65
3 | Warner (FL) (25-6) | 73
3 | Warner (FL) (24-6) | 93
6 | College of the Ozarks (MO) (20-8) | 79
LISTON BRACKET
4 | Warner Pacific (OR) (23-9) | 106
5 | Nebraska Wesleyan (22-7) | 101
4 | Warner Pacific (OR) (24-9) | 68
1 | Davenport (MI) (30-4) | 80
1 | Davenport (MI) (29-4) | 77
8 | Saint Xavier (IL) (19-12) | 62

Quarterfinals; March 12
1 | Saint Francis (IN) (31-4) | 80
3 | Keiser (FL) (30-4) | 53
7 | IU East (IN) (21-13) | 83
1 | Briar Cliff (IA) (32-3) | 81
8 | York (NE) (25-9) | 64
2 | Indiana Wesleyan (30-5) | 89
3 | Warner (FL) (26-6) | 60
1 | Davenport (MI) (31-4) | 77

Semifinals Round; March 14
1 | Saint Francis (IN) (32-4) | 79
7 | IU East (IN) (22-13) | 55
2 | Indiana Wesleyan (31-5) | 66
1 | Davenport (MI) (32-4) | 65

Championship; March 15
1 | Saint Francis (IN) (33-4) | 66
2 | Indiana Wesleyan (32-5) | 69

* denotes game decided in overtime

== Epilogue ==
=== NAIA Division II Men’s Basketball All-America Teams ===
The 2016 All-America team, headed by Davenport's Dominez Burnett for the second straight year, included many standouts from the tournament.

==== 1st Team ====
| Name | School | Hometown |
|---|---|---|
| Dominez Burnett* | Davenport (MI) | Flint, Michigan |
| Austin Fox | Saint Francis (IN) | Muncie, Indiana |
| Trey Bardsley | Nebraska Wesleyan | Beatrice, Nebraska |
| Kyle Steigenga | Cornerstone (MI) | Holland, Michigan |
| Trae Bergh | Dakota Wesleyan (SD) | Crooks, South Dakota |
| Lane Mahurin | Indiana Wesleyan | Rockville, Indiana |
| Clay Yeo | Bethel (IN) | Bourbon, Indiana |
| Johnny Marlin | Indiana Wesleyan | Greenwood, Indiana |
| Ilya Ilyayev | Saint Francis (IL) | Los Angeles, California |
| Warren Hall | Warner (FL) | Tampa, Florida |

- - denotes NAIA/NABC Player of the Year

==== 2nd Team ====
| Name | School | Hometown |
|---|---|---|
| Javonte Byrd | Northwest Christian (OR) | San Diego, California |
| Cameron Coleman | York (NB) | Allen, Texas |
| Tyler Rogers | Alice Lloyd (KY) | Lexington, Kentucky |
| Leland Robinson | Tennessee Wesleyan | Jackson, Tennessee |
| Kyle Kilgore | Dakota State (SD) | Adrian, Minnesota |
| Lance Carter | Tabor (KS) | Troy, Ohio |
| Stanley Whittaker | Keiser (FL) | Philadelphia, Pennsylvania |
| Joel Spear | Southern Oregon | Adelaide, Australia |
| Aaron Larson | Olivet Nazarene | Tolono, Illinois |
| Miles Robinson | Indiana Tech | Grand Rapids, Michigan |

==== 3rd Team ====
| Name | School | Hometown |
|---|---|---|
| Ryan Atkins | West Virginia Tech | Miami, Florida |
| Lucas Huffman | IU East (IN) | Indianapolis, Indiana |
| Ethan Murray | College of the Ozarks (MO) | Neosho, Missouri |
| Brequan Tucker | Jamestown (ND) | Joliet, Illinois |
| J.D. Tucker | Union (KY) | Charleston, South Carolina |
| Bryce Lienhoop | Saint Francis (IN) | Columbus, Indiana |
| Alex Houston | Mount Mercy (IA) | Chicago, Illinois |
| Larry Motuzis | Saint Xavier (IL) | Darien, Illinois |
| Jesse Jones | Midland (NB) | Houston, Texas |
| Taylor Young | Warner Pacific (OR) | Hawthorne, California |

==== Honorable Mention ====
| Name | School | Hometown |
|---|---|---|
| Dominique Bolden | Goshen (IN) | Chicago, Illinois |
| Brian Bridgeforth | Washington Adventist (MD) | Washington, D.C. |
| Jake Bullock | Aquinas (MI) | Lansing, Michigan |
| Cameron Clark | Southwestern (KS) | Lewisville, Texas |
| Brandon Cole | Bryan College (TN) | Crossville, Tennessee |
| Eddie Delegal | Warner (FL) | Brunswick, Georgia |
| Roman Delgado | California State Maritime | Santa Clarita, California |
| Jayden Ferguson | Valley City State (ND) | Williston, North Dakota |
| Chandler Folkerts | Concordia (NB) | Milford, Nebraska |
| Bryan Forbes | Briar Cliff (IA) | Lone Tree, Iowa |
| Kelvin Goodwin | Point Park (PA) | Wheeling Park, West Virginia |
| Terrelle Green | Robert Morris (IL) | Chicago, Illinois |
| Grant Greenberg | Saint Mary (KS) | Leavenworth, Kansas |
| Clayton Herrald | Briar Cliff (IA) | Williams, Iowa |
| Lawrence Jackson | Northwestern Ohio | Rocky Mount, North Carolina |
| D.D. Joiner | Rio Grande (OH) | Columbus, Ohio |
| Earl Jones | Warner Pacific (OR) | Henderson, Nevada |
| Zach Kirschbaum | Trinity International (IL) | Las Vegas, Nevada |
| Ben Lanning | Cornerstone (MI) | Grandville, Michigan |
| Tate Martin | Dakota Wesleyan (SD) | Mitchell, South Dakota |
| Deion McClenton | Keiser (FL) | Columbus, Georgia |
| Austin Morris | Brescia (KY) | Evansville, Indiana |
| Joey Nebeker | College of Idaho | Melba, Idaho |
| Cameron Paschke | College of the Ozarks (MO) | Fayetteville, Arkansas |
| Nick Riley | Union (KY) | Hopkinsville, Kentucky |
| Kyle Stidom | Taylor (IN) | Indianapolis, Indiana |
| Franky Teran | Antelope Valley (CA) | Tucson, Arizona |
| Brandon Vanderhegghen | Grace (IN) | Mishawaka, Indiana |
| Michael Walker | St. Thomas (FL) | Rancho Cucamonga, California |
| Chris Waller | Southwestern (KS) | Houston, Texas |
| Dominique Walls | Indiana Tech | Chicago, Illinois |

== See also ==
- 2016 NAIA Division I men's basketball tournament
- 2016 NCAA Division I men's basketball tournament
- 2016 NCAA Division II men's basketball tournament
- 2016 NCAA Division III men's basketball tournament
- 2016 NAIA Division II women's basketball tournament
