= 2015 NAIA Division II men's basketball tournament =

College basketball tournament

- Teams: 32
- Finals site: Keeter Gymnasium, Point Lookout, Missouri
- Champions: Cornerstone Golden Eagles (3rd title, 3rd title game, 6th Fab Four)
- Runner-up: Dakota Wesleyan Tigers (1st title game, 1st Fab Four)
- Semifinalists: Davenport Panthers (2nd Fab Four); Embry-Riddle Eagles (2nd Fab Four)
- Charles Stevenson Hustle Award: Luke Bamberg (Dakota Wesleyan)
- Chuck Taylor MVP: Kyle Steigenga (Cornerstone)
- Top scorer: Jalen Voss (Dakota Wesleyan) (106 points)

The 2015 NAIA Division II Men's Basketball national championship was held in March at Keeter Gymnasium in Point Lookout, Missouri. The 24th annual NAIA basketball tournament featured thirty-two teams playing in a single-elimination format. The championship game was won by Cornerstone University of Grand Rapids, Michigan over Dakota Wesleyan University of Mitchell, South Dakota by a score of 66 to 45.

== Tournament field ==
The 2015 tournament field was announced on March 14 in a live selection show. The field is made up of 23 automatic qualifiers and eight at-large bids and one automatic host bid presented to College of the Ozarks. This tournament field welcomed the return of four out of the last five champions, led by defending champion and top seed Indiana Wesleyan University along with Cardinal Stritch, Cornerstone, and Saint Francis. There were four newcomers to the bracket, Brescia, Northwestern Ohio, Olivet Nazarene and St. Francis of Illinois.

The complete field consists of Ashford, Bellevue, Bethel, Brescia, Briar Cliff, Cal Maritime, Cardinal Stritch, Concordia, Cornerstone, Dakota State, Davenport, Embry-Riddle, Friends, Grace, College of Idaho, Indiana University East, Indiana Wesleyan, Midland, Milligan, Morningside, Mount Mercy, Northwestern Ohio, Olivet Nazarene, College of the Ozarks, Saint Francis, Saint Thomas, Southern Oregon, Tabor, Union, and Warner Pacific.

== Highlights ==
=== Fab Four ===
The fifth ranked Dakota Wesleyan Tigers came back from a twelve-point deficit to defeat the College of Idaho Yotes 88-80 and advance to the NAIA championship game. On the other side of the bracket, Davenport hit three free throws in the final six seconds to secure a 79–75 win over defending champion Indiana Wesleyan.

=== Championship game ===
Cornerstone won their third national championship, defeating Dakota Wesleyan 66–45 behind a twenty-four point performance by Ben Lanning.

== Tourney awards and honors ==
- Dr. James Naismith/Emil Liston Team Sportsmanship Award: Southern Oregon

=== Individual recognition ===
- Most Outstanding Player: Dominez Burnett, Davenport
- Championship Hustle Award: Luke Bamberg, Dakota Wesleyan
- NABC/NAIA Division II Coach of the Year: Kim Elders, Cornerstone
- Rawlings-NAIA Division II National Coach of the Year: Matt Wilber, Dakota Wesleyan
- 2015 NAIA Division II Men's Basketball All-Championship Team

Name	School
Dominez Burnett*	Davenport
Bishop Robinson	Davenport
Trae Bergh	Dakota Wesleyan
Jalen Voss	Dakota Wesleyan
Kris Menning	Dakota Wesleyan
Ben Lanning	Cornerstone
Travis Wells	Cornerstone
DeForest Carter	Embry-Riddle
Cesar Pastrana	Embry-Riddle
Dalton Barnes	Embry-Riddle

=== Statistical leaders ===
(minimum 4 games)

Category	Player	School	Tally
Most points	Jalen Voss	Dakota Wesleyan	106
Most points per game	Dominez Burnett	Davenport	21.25
Leading rebounder	Ben Lanning	Cornerstone	59
Leading rebounder per game	Ben Lanning	Cornerstone	11.8
Most assists	DeForest Carter	Embry-Riddle	45
Assists per game	DeForest Carter	Embry-Riddle	11.25
Assist/Turnover ratio	Martin Tate	Dakota Wesleyan	5.33
Three-pointers made	Trae Bergh	Dakota Wesleyan	16
Best overall field goal percentage	Cesar Pastrana	Embry-Riddle	71.4% (25–35)
Best 3-point field goal percentage	Dominez Burnett	Davenport	77.8% (7–9)
Most free throws made	Cesar Pastrana (Tie)	Embry-Riddle	24
Most free throws made	Kyle Steigenga (Tie)	Cornerstone	24
Best free throw percentage	Ty Mason	Cornerstone	92.9% (13–14)
Most steals	DeForest Carter	Embry-Riddle	21
Most steals per game	DeForest Carter	Embry-Riddle	5.25
Most shots blocked	Ben Lanning	Cornerstone	7
Most shots blocked per game	Ben Lanning	Cornerstone	1.4

== Bracket ==
First round March 11–12
1	Indiana Wesleyan	77
Brescia	56
16	Warner Pacific	79
Olivet Nazarene	54
9	Mount Mercy	64
Cal Maritime	61
8	Davenport	68
Briar Cliff	66
5	Dakota Wesleyan	98
Milligan	55
12	Bethel	57
Ashford	83
13	College of the Ozarks	69
Cardinal Stritch	78
4	College of Idaho	65
Dakota State	64
3	Cornerstone	74
St. Thomas	58
14	Concordia	116
Indiana University East	90
11	Saint Francis (Ind.)	70
Saint Francis (Ill.)	68
6	Morningside	86
Tabor	79
7	Bellevue	50
Grace	54
10	Midland	71
Southern Oregon	73
15	Union	64
Northwestern Ohio	58
2	Embry-Riddle	76
Friends	47

Second round March 13
1	Indiana Wesleyan	79
16	Warner Pacific	71
9	Mount Mercy	67
8	Davenport	70
5	Dakota Wesleyan	65
Ashford	49
Cardinal Stritch	80
4	College of Idaho	99
3	Cornerstone	97
14	Concordia	78
11	Saint Francis	72
6	Morningside	70
Grace	62
Southern Oregon	68
15	Union	75
2	Embry-Riddle	89

Quarterfinals; March 14
1	Indiana Wesleyan	75
8	Davenport	79
5	Dakota Wesleyan	88
4	College of Idaho	80
3	Cornerstone	75
11	Saint Francis (Ind.)	64
Southern Oregon	71
2	Embry-Riddle	79

Semifinals; March 16
8	Davenport	51
5	Dakota Wesleyan	80
3	Cornerstone	91
2	Embry-Riddle	81

National championship March 17
5	Dakota Wesleyan	45
3	Cornerstone	66

== Epilogue ==
When the NAIA Division II Men's Basketball All-America Teams, almost all the players were represented at the national tournament, with a few notable exceptions including Lawrence Jackson of Northwestern Ohio, Jordan Nelson of Waldorf, Andre Winston of Southeastern.

NAIA Division II Men's Basketball All-America Teams

1st Team

Name	School	Hometown
Dominez Burnett*	Davenport	Flint, Michigan
DeForest Carter	Embry-Riddle	Big Cypress, Florida
Grant Greenberg	Saint Mary	Leavenworth, Kansas
Johnny Marlin	Indiana Wesleyan	Greenwood, Indiana
Steve O’Neill	Morningside	Council Bluffs, Iowa
Matt Schauss	Bethel	Greens Fork, Indiana
Tony Smit	Cardinal Stritch	Fond du Lac, Wisconsin
Kyle Steigenga	Cornerstone	Holland, Michigan
Jalen Voss	Dakota Wesleyan	Worthington, Minnesota
Josh Wilson	College of Idaho	Los Angeles, California

- - denotes NAIA/NABC Player of the Year

2nd Team

Name	School	Hometown
Lawrence Jackson	Northwestern, Ohio	Rocky Mount, North Carolina
Jordan Nelson	Waldorf	Neenah, Wisconsin
Dondre Osborn	Mount Mercy	Zion, Illinois
Demetrius Perkins	College of Idaho	Compton, California
Tobin Reinwald	Hastings	Lincoln, Nebraska
Alex Starkel	Midland	Norfolk, Nebraska
Zach Steinmetz	Lourdes	Toledo, Ohio
Tim Weber	Southern Oregon	Roseburg, Oregon
Andre Winston	Southeastern	Tacoma, Washington
Clay Yeo	Bethel	Bourbon, Indiana

3rd Team

Name	School	Hometown
Brandon Cole	Bryan	Crossville, Tennessee
Brandon Eley	AIB	Zearing, Iowa
Austin Fox	Saint Francis (Ind)	Muncie, Indiana
Ilya Ilyayev	Saint Francis (Ill)	Los Angeles, California
Aaron Larson	Olivet Nazarene	Tolono, Illinois
Alex Starkel	Midland	Norfolk, Nebraska
Ben Lenning	Cornerstone	Grandville, Michigan
Kris Menning	Dakota Wesleyan	Corsica, South Dakota
Austin Morris	Brescia	Evansville, Indiana
Brequan Tucker	Jamestown	Joliet, Illinois

Honorable Mention

Name	School	Hometown
Bryant Allen	Dakota State	Maplewood, Missouri
Trey Bardsley	Nebraska Wesleyan	Beatrice, Nebraska
Cameron Clark	Southwestern	Lewisville, Texas
Derek Daniels	College of the Ozarks	Mountain View, Missouri
Jeremy Comer	Presentation	Indianapolis, Indiana
Nick Frazier	St. Ambrose	Bellwood, Illinois
Warren Hall	Warner (Fla.)	Tampa, Florida
Logan Irwin	Grace (Ind.)	South Whitley, Indiana
Deante Johnson	Union College (Kentucky)	Cincinnati, Ohio
Jack Krieger	Saint Xavier (Illinois)	Plainfield, Illinois
Percy Lemle	Bellevue (Nebraska)	Carson, California
Gabriel Martinez	Northern New Mexico	Albuquerque, New Mexico
Alex Marzette	Robert Morris (Ill.)	Racine, Wisconsin
Fredricus Mattison	Northwood (Fla.)	Anderson, South Carolina
Diamontae McKinley	Ashford (Iowa)	Milwaukee, Wisconsin
Esvan Middleton	Concordia (Oregon)	Culver City, California
Cesar Pastrana	Embry-Riddle (Florida)	Cartagena, Colombia
Nathan Rindels	Dordt (Iowa)	Boulder, Colorado
Alec Schwab	William Penn (Iowa)	Peru, Illinois
Trey Scott	Waldorf (Iowa)	Fridley, Minnesota
Jake Simpson	Indiana University Southeast	Louisville, Kentucky
Dion Smith	Marian (Ind.)	Indianapolis, Ind.
Andrew Thomas	Tabor (Kansas)	Grenada
Eric Thompson	Southern Oregon	Roseburg, Oregon
Jerah’me Williams	Point Park (Pa.)	Youngstown, Ohio

== See also ==
- 2015 NAIA Division I men's basketball tournament
- 2015 NCAA Division I men's basketball tournament
- 2015 NCAA Division II men's basketball tournament
- 2015 NCAA Division III men's basketball tournament
- 2015 NAIA Division II women's basketball tournament
