= 2001 NAIA Division II men's basketball tournament =

- Teams: 32
- Finals site: Keeter Gymnasium; Point Lookout, Missouri
- Champions: Northwestern Red Raiders (1st title, 2nd title game, 2nd Fab Four)
- Runner-up: MidAmerica Nazarene Pioneers (1st title game, 1st Fab Four)
- Semifinalists: Cornerstone Golden Eagles (2nd Fab Four); Rio Grande RedStorm (1st Fab Four)
- Charles Stevenson Hustle Award: Nathan Copas (Rio Grande)
- Chuck Taylor MVP: Brandon Woudstra (Northwestern (IA))
- Top scorer: Dan Fleming (MidAmerica Nazarene) (150 points)

The 2001 NAIA Division II men's basketball tournament was the tournament held by the NAIA to determine the national champion of men's college basketball among its Division II members in the United States and Canada for the 2000–01 basketball season.

Northwestern (IA) defeated MidAmerica Nazarene in the championship game, 82–78, to claim the Red Raiders' first NAIA national title.

The tournament was played at Keeter Gymnasium on the campus of the College of the Ozarks in Point Lookout, Missouri.

== Qualification ==
The tournament field remained fixed at thirty-two teams, and the top sixteen teams were seeded.

The tournament continued to utilize a single-elimination format.

== Bracket ==
First round
1	Embry–Riddle (FL)	93
College of the Ozarks	86
Husson	71
16	Saint Mary (KS)	92
9	Cornerstone	88
Holy Names	76
Concordia Nebraska	88
8	Cardinal Stritch	70
5	Dickinson State	67
Brevard	51
Roberts Wesleyan	74
12	MidAmerica Nazarene	101
13	Briar Cliff	73
Point Park	93
Wilmington (DE)	65
4	Oregon Tech	83
3	Marian	63
Belhaven	46
Huron	87
14	Notre Dame (CA)	88
11	Rio Grande	62
Dominican (NY)	61
Grand View	67
6	Evangel	73
7	Northwestern (IA)	83
Northwestern St. Paul	77
Tabor	79
10	Milligan	76
15	Bellevue (NE)	58
Albertson	62
Lyndon State	66
2	Siena Heights	121

Second round
1	Embry–Riddle	95
16	Saint Mary (KS)	90
9	Cornerstone	85
Concordia Nebraska	77
5	Dickinson State	73
12	MidAmerica Nazarene	84
Point Park	74
4	Oregon Tech	82
3	Marian	68
14	Notre Dame (CA)	54
11	Rio Grande	81
6	Evangel	75
7	Northwestern (IA)	71
Tabor	63
Albertson	96
2	Siena Heights	88

Quarterfinals
1	Embry–Riddle	80
9	Cornerstone	87
12	MidAmerica Nazarene	81
4	Oregon Tech	69
3	Marian	62
11	Rio Grande	83
7	Northwestern (IA)	88
Albertson	79

Semifinals
9	Cornerstone	61
12	MidAmerica Nazarene	81
11	Rio Grande	91
7	Northwestern (IA)	110

National championship
12	MidAmerica Nazarene	78
7	Northwestern (IA)	82

== See also ==
- 2001 NAIA Division I men's basketball tournament
- 2001 NCAA Division I men's basketball tournament
- 2001 NCAA Division II men's basketball tournament
- 2001 NCAA Division III men's basketball tournament
- 2001 NAIA Division II women's basketball tournament
