= 2011 NAIA Division II men's basketball tournament =

College basketball tournament

- 2011 NAIA Division II Men’s Basketball National Championship
- Teams: 32
- Finals site: Keeter Gymnasium, Point Lookout, Missouri
- Champions: Cornerstone Golden Eagles (2nd title, 2nd title game, 5th Fab Four)
- Runner-up: Saint Francis Cougars (2nd title game, 2nd Fab Four)
- Semifinalists: College of the Ozarks Bobcats (4th Fab Four); Northwood Timberwolves (1st Fab Four)
- Charles Stevenson Hustle Award: Ferdinand Morales-Soto (Saint Francis (IN))
- Chuck Taylor MVP: Caleb Simons (Cornerstone)
- Top scorer: Sadiel Rojas (Oklahoma Wesleyan) (73 points)

The 2011 NAIA Division II Men's Basketball national championship was held in March at Keeter Gymnasium in Point Lookout, Missouri. The 20th annual NAIA basketball tournament featured 32 teams playing in a single-elimination format.

== Awards and honors ==
- Leading scorer:
- Leading rebounder:

== Bracket ==
First round March 9–10	Second round March 11
1	Walsh (OH) (30-1)	81
--	Union (KY) (16-16)	59
1	Walsh (OH)	66
--	College of the Ozarks (MO)	71
--	College of the Ozarks (MO) (22-11)	66
16	Sioux Falls (SD) (24-9)	58
1st SEED TIER; March 9
9	Indiana Wesleyan (27-7)	95
--	Indiana East (23-10)	92
9	Indiana Wesleyan	84
8	Oregon Tech	63
--	Cardinal Stritch (WI) (21-13)	61
8	Oregon Tech (30-4)	76
5	Black Hills State (SD) (27-5)	85
--	Holy Names (CA) (20-14)	62
5	Black Hills State (SD)	74*
12	Davenport (MI)	78
--	Briar Cliff (IA) (23-9)	68
12	Davenport (MI) (28-5)	72
4th SEED TIER; March 9
13	Saint Francis (IN) (25-9)	87
--	Northwest (WA) (21-9)	79
13	Saint Francis (IN)	76
4	Bellevue (NE)	74
--	Ashford (IA) (23-11)	45
4	Bellevue (NE) (28-5)	66
3	Cornerstone (MI) (30-4)	100
--	Johnson & Wales (CO) (14-15)	69
3	Cornerstone (MI)	82
14	Iowa Wesleyan	70
--	Indiana Southeast (21-11)	75
14	Iowa Wesleyan (24-5)	86
3rd SEED TIER; March 10
11	Northwestern (IA) (22-9)	83
--	Warner Pacific (OR) (20-10)	94
--	Warner Pacific (OR)	58
--	McPherson (KS)	77
--	McPherson (KS) (20-13)	66
6	Embry-Riddle (FL) (29-5)	60
7	Oklahoma Wesleyan (28-4)	82
--	Sterling (KS) (21-11)	81*
7	Oklahoma Wesleyan	78
10	Eastern Oregon	63
--	Cedarville (OH) (20-13)	74
10	Eastern Oregon (26-6)	82
2nd SEED TIER; March 10
15	Grace (IN) (22-11)	62
--	Dakota Wesleyan (SD) (24-8)	71
--	Dakota Wesleyan (SD)	58
2	Northwood (FL)	65
--	Fisher (MA) (15-15)	64
2	Northwood (FL) (31-3)	91

Quarterfinals; March 12
--	College of the Ozarks (MO)	68
9	Indiana Wesleyan	64
12	Davenport (MI)	57
13	Saint Francis (IN)	61
3	Cornerstone (MI)	87
--	McPherson (KS)	52
7	Oklahoma Wesleyan	59
2	Northwood (FL)	83

Semifinals; March 14
--	College of the Ozarks (MO)	64
13	Saint Francis (IN)	67
3	Cornerstone (MI)	82
2	Northwood (FL)	52

National championship March 15
13	Saint Francis (IN)	71
3	Cornerstone (MI)	80

- * denotes overtime.

== See also ==
- 2011 NAIA Division I men's basketball tournament
- 2011 NCAA Division I men's basketball tournament
- 2011 NCAA Division II men's basketball tournament
- 2011 NCAA Division III men's basketball tournament
- 2011 NAIA Division II women's basketball tournament
