= 2018 NAIA Division II men's basketball tournament =

College basketball tournament

- Teams: 32
- Finals site: Sanford Pentagon; Sioux Falls, South Dakota
- Champions: Indiana Wesleyan Wildcats (3rd title, 3rd title game, 4th Fab Four)
- Runner-up: Saint Francis Cougars (4th title game, 4th Fab Four)
- Semifinalists: IU East Red Wolves (2nd Fab Four); College of Idaho Coyotes (2nd Fab Four)
- Charles Stevenson Hustle Award: Ben Carlson (Indiana Wesleyan)
- Chuck Taylor MVP: Kyle Mangas (Indiana Wesleyan)
- Top scorer: Colton Kooima (Northwestern (IA)) (67 points)

The 2018 NAIA Division II Men’s Basketball national championship was held from March 7–13 at the Sanford Pentagon in Sioux Falls, SD. The 27th annual NAIA basketball tournament featured thirty-two teams playing in a single-elimination format. In a rematch of the 2016 Championship game, the outcome was the same. The championship game was won by the Indiana Wesleyan Wildcats of Marion, Indiana over the Saint Francis Cougars of Fort Wayne, Indiana by a score of 84 to 71.

== Bracket ==
First Round; March 7–8	Second Round; March 9
1	IU East (IN) (32-2)	91
8	Voorhees (SC) (18-11)	79
1	IU East (IN) (33-2)	82**
4	Oklahoma Wesleyan (27-8)	77
4	Oklahoma Wesleyan (26-8)	83*
5	Bethel (IN) (22-10)	75
NAISMITH BRACKET
3	Briar Cliff (IA) (25-7)	80
6	Oregon Tech (22-11)	70
3	Briar Cliff (IA) (26-7)	90
2	St. Thomas (FL) (24-7)	74
2	St. Thomas (FL) (23-7)	79*
7	Michigan-Dearborn (21-13)	77
1	Indiana Wesleyan (26-7)	87
8	Antelope Valley (CA) (20-7)	76
1	Indiana Wesleyan (27-7)	85
4	IU Southeast (IN) (24-8)	72
4	IU Southeast (IN) (23-8)	84
5	Stillman (AL) (27-4)	66
CRAMER BRACKET
3	Warner Pacific (OR) (23-9)	68
6	Southeastern (FL) (21-9)	57
3	Warner Pacific (OR) (24-9)	73
2	Morningside (IA) (27-6)	84
2	Morningside (IA) (26-6)	87
7	Trinity International (IL) (21-10)	69
1	College of Idaho (27-6)	66
8	Mayville State (ND) (18-10)	50
1	College of Idaho (28-6)	62
5	Dakota Wesleyan (SD) (23-10)	60
4	Governors State (IL) (25-8)	67
5	Dakota Wesleyan (SD) (22-10)	84
DUER BRACKET
3	Union (KY) (23-7)	59
6	Marian (IN) (20-11)	79
6	Marian (IN) (21-11)	90
2	Indiana Tech (27-6)	74
2	Indiana Tech (26-6)	89*
7	WVU Tech (WV) (20-11)	83
1	Cornerstone (MI) (29-4)	88
8	Milligan (TN) (15-14)	68
1	Cornerstone (MI) (30-4)	92
4	Southwestern (KS) (27-7)	73
4	Southwestern (KS) (26-7)	65
5	Roosevelt (IL) (26-7)	55
LISTON BRACKET
3	Northwestern (IA) (25-6)	75
6	Bellevue (NE) (21-11)	62
3	Northwestern (IA) (26-6)	83
2	Saint Francis (IN) (26-8)	94
2	Saint Francis (IN) (25-8)	83
7	Keiser (FL) (20-10)	73

Quarterfinals; March 10
1	IU East (IN) (34-2)	76
3	Briar Cliff (IA) (27-7)	68
1	Indiana Wesleyan (28-7)	86
2	Morningside (IA) (28-6)	68
1	College of Idaho (29-6)	75
6	Marian (IN) (22-11)	47
1	Cornerstone (MI) (31-4)	79
2	Saint Francis (IN) (27-8)	90

Semifinals Round; March 12
1	IU East (IN) (35-2)	72
1	Indiana Wesleyan (29-7)	75
1	College of Idaho (30-6)	59
2	Saint Francis (IN) (28-8)	70

Championship; March 13
1	Indiana Wesleyan (30-7)	84
2	Saint Francis (IN) (29-8)	71

* denotes game decided in overtime

== See also ==
- 2018 NAIA Division I men's basketball tournament
- 2018 NCAA Division I men's basketball tournament
- 2018 NCAA Division II men's basketball tournament
- 2018 NCAA Division III men's basketball tournament
- 2018 NAIA Division II women's basketball tournament
