= 2010 NAIA Division II men's basketball tournament =

College basketball tournament

- 2010 NAIA Division II Men’s Basketball National Championship
- Teams: 32
- Finals site: Keeter Gymnasium; Point Lookout, Missouri
- Champions: Saint Francis Cougars (1st title, 1st title game, 1st Fab Four)
- Runner-up: Walsh Cavaliers (2nd title game, 3rd Fab Four)
- Semifinalists: Bellevue Bruins (3rd Fab Four); Oklahoma Wesleyan Eagles (2nd Fab Four)
- Charles Stevenson Hustle Award: Ferdinand Morales-Soto (Saint Francis (IN))
- Chuck Taylor MVP: DeJovaun Sawyer-Davis (Saint Francis (IN))
- Top scorer: Steve Briggs (Oklahoma Wesleyan) (117 points)

The 2010 NAIA Division II Men’s Basketball national championship was held in March at Keeter Gymnasium in Point Lookout, Missouri. The 19th annual NAIA basketball tournament featured 32 teams playing in a single-elimination format.

== Awards and honors ==
- Leading scorer:
- Leading rebounder:

== Bracket ==
First round March 10–11	Second round March 12
1	Walsh (Ohio) (28-2)	97
-	Maine-Fort Kent (21-8)	69
1	Walsh (Ohio)	98
-	Sioux Falls (South Dakota)	90
-	Sioux Falls (South Dakota) (24-9)	69*
16	Grand View (Iowa) (25-7)	65
1st SEED TIER; March 10
9	Bethel (Indiana) (27-6)	77
-	Friends (Kansas) (25-6)	67
9	Bethel (Indiana)	64
8	Embry-Riddle (Florida)	67*
-	Evergreen State (Washington) (19-10)	78
8	Embry-Riddle (Florida) (28-5)	80
5	Indiana-Southeast (25-4)	77
-	Johnson & Wales (Colorado) (17-13)	56
5	Indiana-Southeast	58
-	Spring Arbor (Michigan)	54
-	Spring Arbor (Michigan) (22-10)	58
12	Northwood (Florida) (27-6)	57
4th SEED TIER; March 11
13	Cedarville (Ohio) (25-8)	86*
-	Warner Pacific (Oregon) (22-9)	77
13	Cedarville (Ohio)	69
4	Bellevue (Nebraska)	70
-	William Jessup (California) (17-13)	67
4	Bellevue (Nebraska) (25-7)	85
3	Indiana Wesleyan (28-5)	81
-	Virginia-Wise (17-12)	56
3	Indiana Wesleyan	70
14	Eastern Oregon	57
-	Davenport (Michigan) (23-9)	69
14	Eastern Oregon (22-8)	74
3rd SEED TIER; March 11
11	Cardinal Stritch (Wisconsin) (27-5)	62
-	Hastings (Nebraska) (23-8)	65
-	Hastings (Nebraska)	83
6	Oklahoma Wesleyan	100
-	Jamestown (North Dakota) (20-11)	70
6	Oklahoma Wesleyan (27-4)	76
7	Dakota Wesleyan (South Dakota) (27-5)	79
-	McPherson (Kansas) (20-8)	66
7	Dakota Wesleyan (South Dakota)	56
10	Cornerstone (Michigan)	64
-	Ozarks (Missouri) (20-10)	72
10	Cornerstone (Michigan) (27-6)	73
2nd SEED TIER; March 10
15	Saint Francis (Indiana) (23-9)	86
-	Black Hills State (South Dakota) (21-9)	83
15	Saint Francis (Indiana)	75
2	Oregon Tech	67
-	Judson (Illinois) (17-12)	57
2	Oregon Tech	63

Quarterfinals; March 13
1	Walsh (Ohio)	74
8	Embry-Riddle (Florida)	67
5	Indiana-Southeast	65
4	Bellevue (Nebraska)	71
3	Indiana Wesleyan	59
6	Oklahoma Wesleyan	71
10	Cornerstone (Michigan)	73
15	Saint Francis (Indiana)	79

Semifinals; March 15
1	Walsh (Ohio)	67
4	Bellevue (Nebraska)	66
6	Oklahoma Wesleyan	73
15	Saint Francis (Indiana)	77

National championship March 16
1	Walsh (Ohio)	66
15	Saint Francis (Indiana)	67

- * denotes overtime.

== See also ==
- 2010 NAIA Division I men's basketball tournament
- 2010 NCAA Division I men's basketball tournament
- 2010 NCAA Division II men's basketball tournament
- 2010 NCAA Division III men's basketball tournament
- 2010 NAIA Division II women's basketball tournament
