= 2009 NAIA Division II men's basketball tournament =

College basketball tournament

- Teams: 32
- Finals site: Keeter Gymnasium; Point Lookout, Missouri
- Champions: Oklahoma Wesleyan Eagles (1st title, 1st title game, 1st Fab Four)
- Runner-up: College of the Ozarks Bobcats (3rd title game, 3rd Fab Four)
- Semifinalists: Bethel Pilots (5th Fab Four); Black Hills State Yellow Jackets (1st Fab Four)
- Charles Stevenson Hustle Award: Isaiah Peterson (Oklahoma Wesleyan)
- Chuck Taylor MVP: Steve Briggs (Oklahoma Wesleyan)
- Top scorer: Steve Briggs (Oklahoma Wesleyan) (147 points)

The 2009 NAIA Division II Men’s Basketball national championship was held in March at Keeter Gymnasium in Point Lookout, Missouri. The 18th annual NAIA basketball tournament featured 32 teams playing in a single-elimination format.

== Awards and honors ==
- tournament hustle award: Isaiah Peterson of Oklahoma Wesleyan
- Rawlings Coach of the Year Award: Donnie Bostwick of Oklahoma Wesleyan
- Emil Liston Team Sportsmanship Award: Indiana Wesleyan
- Tournament most valuable player: Steve Briggs of Oklahoma Wesleyan
- Leading scorer: Steve Briggs of Oklahoma Wesleyan

The All-Tournament Team consisted of the following players:

- Steve Briggs-Oklahoma Wesleyan
- Eric Gaff-Grace
- Kyle Prochaska-Bellevue
- Antonio Murrell-Indiana Wesleyan
- Luke Enos-Black Hills State
- William Walker-Bethel
- Sadiel Rojas-Oklahoma Wesleyan
- Jared Howerton-College of the Ozarks
- Colt Blair-College of the Ozarks
- Cory Stone-College of the Ozarks

== Bracket ==
First round March 11–12	Second round March 13
1	Oklahoma Wesleyan (30-2)	115
--	Fisher (MA) (21-12)	74
1	Oklahoma Wesleyan	74
--	Grand View (IA)	68
--	Grand View (IA) (24-8)	90
16	Dakota Wesleyan (SD) (25-9)	84*
1st SEED TIER; March 9
9	Eastern Oregon (23-7)	88
--	King (TN) (24-8)	75
9	Eastern Oregon	82
8	Northwood (FL)	66
--	Sterling (KS) (21-10)	72
8	Northwood (FL) (26-5)	75
5	Black Hills State (SD) (27-4)	62
--	Cal State-East Bay (19-8)	58
5	Black Hills State (SD)	84
12	Morningside (IA)	73
--	St. Thomas (FL) (20-11)	60
12	Morningside (IA) (23-7)	62
4th SEED TIER; March 9
13	Warner Pacific (OR) (21-9)	72
--	Grace (IN) (20-10)	82
--	Grace (IN)	75
--	Ottawa (KS)	67
--	Ottawa (KS) (18-13)	91
4	Walsh (OH) (27-4)	83
3	Cedarville (OH) (27-4)	63
--	Sioux Falls (SD) (19-15)	66
--	Sioux Falls (SD)	56
--	College of the Ozarks (MO)	70
--	College of the Ozarks (MO) (21-10)	71
14	Aquinas (MI) (24-10)	60
3rd SEED TIER; March 10
11	Bluefield (VA) (27-7)	86
--	Evergreen (WA) (19-11)	101
--	Evergreen (WA)	61
6	Indiana Wesleyan	83
--	Trinity (IL) (23-9)	61
6	Indiana Wesleyan (27-6)	67
7	Oregon Tech (28-5)	69
--	Iowa Wesleyan (20-11)	47
7	Oregon Tech	64
--	Bellevue (NE)	78
--	Bellevue (NE) (22-8)	84
10	Mt. Vernon Nazarene (OH) (23-9)	75
2nd SEED TIER; March 10
15	Indiana-Southeast (23-7)	76
--	Briar Cliff (IA) (23-8)	59
15	Indiana-Southeast	68
2	Bethel (IN)	88
--	Johnson & Wales (CO) (15-18)	58
2	Bethel (IN) (30-3)	86

Quarterfinals; March 14
1	Oklahoma Wesleyan	80
9	Eastern Oregon	79
5	Black Hills State (SD)	77
--	Grace (IN)	73
--	College of the Ozarks (MO)	79
6	Indiana Wesleyan	70
--	Bellevue (NE)	77
2	Bethel (IN)	82

Semifinals; March 16
1	Oklahoma Wesleyan	85
5	Black Hills State (SD)	72
--	College of the Ozarks (MO)	73
2	Bethel (IN)	64

National championship March 17
1	Oklahoma Wesleyan	60
--	College of the Ozarks (MO)	53

- * denotes overtime.

== See also ==
- 2009 NAIA Division I men's basketball tournament
- 2009 NCAA Division I men's basketball tournament
- 2009 NCAA Division II men's basketball tournament
- 2009 NCAA Division III men's basketball tournament
- 2009 NAIA Division II women's basketball tournament
