= NAIA Division II women's basketball championship =

- Sport: Basketball
- Founded: 1992
- Folded: 2020
- No. of teams: 20 (1992–93); 24 (1994); 32 (1995–2019)
- Venues: Monmouth, Oregon; Angola, Indiana; Sioux City, Iowa
- Most titles: Northwestern (IA) (5)
- Related competitions: NAIA Division I Women's Basketball Championship
- Website: NAIA.org; NAIA Men's Basketball

The NAIA Division II women's basketball championship is the former tournament held by the NAIA to determine the national champion of women's college basketball among its Division II members in the United States and Canada.

The tournament was held annually from 1992 to 2019, after which the NAIA consolidated its two divisions, returning to the single national championship for men's and women's basketball that it held between 1981 and 1991. The last separate Division II tournament was scheduled for 2020, but it was ultimately cancelled due to the COVID-19 pandemic, thus making the 2019 the last completed event.

Over its twenty-eight year history, the tournament was played in three cities and at four venues. Unlike the NCAA's annual basketball tournaments, where games are played at an assortment of regional sites over the course of several weeks, all NAIA tournament games were played at a single, centralized arena.

Northwestern College had the most national titles with five.

Morningside College, the 2015 champion, had the second most national titles with four. Northwestern also had the most tournament championship game appearances, with six.

== Results ==
NAIA Division II Women's Basketball Championship
Year	Arena	Location	Championship			Semifinalists
Year	Arena	Location	Champion	Score	Runner-up	Semifinalists
1992; Details	New PE Building	Monmouth, Oregon	Northern State	73–56	Tarleton State	Mount St. Joseph & Western Oregon
1993; Details	New PE Building	Monmouth, Oregon	Northern Montana	71–68	Northern State	Husson & Tarleton State
1994; Details	New PE Building	Monmouth, Oregon	Northern State (2)	48–45	Western Oregon	Concordia Wisconsin & Mount Mercy
1995; Details	New PE Building	Monmouth, Oregon	Western Oregon	75–67	Northwest Nazarene	Mount Mercy & Shawnee State
1996; Details	Hershey Hall	Angola, Indiana	Western Oregon (2)	80–77	Huron	Doane & Evangel
1997; Details	Hershey Hall	Angola, Indiana	Northwest Nazarene	64–46	Black Hills State	Doane & Southern Oregon
1998; Details	Sioux City Auditorium	Sioux City, Iowa	Walsh	73–66	Mary Hardin–Baylor	Doane & South Dakota Tech
1999; Details	Sioux City Auditorium	Sioux City, Iowa	Shawnee State	80–65	Saint Francis (IN)	Central Methodist & South Dakota Tech
2000; Details	Sioux City Auditorium	Sioux City, Iowa	Mary (ND)	59–49	Northwestern (IA)	Northwest Nazarene & Saint Francis (IN)
2001; Details	Sioux City Auditorium	Sioux City, Iowa	Northwestern (IA)	77–50	Albertson	Briar Cliff & Sterling
2002; Details	Sioux City Auditorium	Sioux City, Iowa	Hastings	73–69	Cornerstone	Briar Cliff & Dakota Wesleyan
2003; Details	Sioux City Auditorium	Sioux City, Iowa	Hastings (2)	59–53	Dakota Wesleyan	Concordia Nebraska & Sioux Falls
2004; Details	Gateway Arena	Sioux City, Iowa	Morningside	87–74	Cedarville	Hastings & Mary (ND)
2005; Details	Gateway Arena	Sioux City, Iowa	Morningside (2)	75–65	Cedarville	Concordia Nebraska & Evangel
2006; Details	Gateway Arena	Sioux City, Iowa	Hastings (3)	58–39	Ozarks (MO)	Northwestern (IA) & Saint Francis (IN)
2007; Details	Gateway Arena	Sioux City, Iowa	Indiana Wesleyan	48–34	Ozarks (MO)	Cedarville & MidAmerica Nazarene
2008; Details	Gateway Arena	Sioux City, Iowa	Northwestern (IA) (2)	82–75	Ozarks (MO)	Hastings & Morningside
2009; Details	Gateway Arena	Sioux City, Iowa	Morningside (3)	68–62	Hastings	Northwestern (IA) & Ozarks (MO)
2010; Details	Gateway Arena	Sioux City, Iowa	Northwestern (IA) (3)	85–66	Shawnee State	Briar Cliff & Indiana Wesleyan
2011; Details	Gateway Arena	Sioux City, Iowa	Northwestern (IA) (4)	88–83	Davenport	Morningside & Walsh
2012; Details	Gateway Arena	Sioux City, Iowa	Northwestern (IA) (5)	75–62	Ozarks (MO)	Briar Cliff & Concordia Nebraska
2013; Details	Gateway Arena	Sioux City, Iowa	Indiana Wesleyan (2)	61–43	Davenport (MI)	Morningside & Northwestern (IA)
2014; Details	Gateway Arena	Sioux City, Iowa	Saint Francis (IN)	75–68	Ozarks (MO)	Cardinal Stritch & Davenport
2015; Details	Gateway Arena	Sioux City, Iowa	Morningside (4)	59–57	Concordia Nebraska	Briar Cliff & Hastings
2016; Details	Gateway Arena	Sioux City, Iowa	Marian (IN)	59–48	Southern Oregon	Goshen & Mount Marty
2017; Details	Gateway Arena	Sioux City, Iowa	Marian (IN) (2)	66–52	Saint Xavier	Concordia Nebraska & St. Francis (IL)
2018; Details	Gateway Arena	Sioux City, Iowa	Dakota Wesleyan	82–59	Concordia Nebraska	Northwestern (IA) & Saint Xavier
2019; Details	Tyson Events Center	Sioux City, Iowa	Concordia Nebraska	67–59	Southeastern (FL)	Dakota Wesleyan & Northwestern (IA)
2020; Details	Tyson Events Center	Sioux City, Iowa	Tournament canceled in the middle of the first round due to the COVID-19 pandemic			None

== Champions ==
Schools that have won the NAIA Division II Women's Basketball Championship
5, 4, 3, 2, 1
- Division I titles are not included in this list. Schools in italics are no longer in the NAIA.

Team	Championships	Winning years
Northwestern (IA)	5	2001, 2008, 2010, 2011, 2012
Morningside	4	2004, 2005, 2009, 2015
Hastings	3	2002, 2003, 2006
Northern State	2	1992, 1994
Western Oregon	2	1995, 1996
Indiana Wesleyan	2	2007, 2013
Marian	2	2016, 2017
Northern Montana	1	1993
Northwest Nazarene	1	1997
Walsh	1	1998
Shawnee State	1	1999
Mary	1	2000
Saint Francis (IN)	1	2014
Dakota Wesleyan	1	2018
Concordia Nebraska	1	2019

- Schools highlight in yellow have reclassified athletics from the NAIA.

== See also ==
- NAIA Division I Women's Basketball Championship
- NAIA Division I Men's Basketball Championship
- NAIA Division II Men's Basketball Championship
- NCAA Division I women's basketball tournament
- NCAA Division II women's basketball tournament
- NCAA Division III women's basketball tournament
