= Bishop John M. D'Arcy Stadium =

Multi-purpose stadium in Fort Wayne, Indiana, U.S.

- Interactive map of Bishop John M. D'Arcy Stadium
- Former names: Cougar Stadium (–2004)
- Address: 1598 Lindenwood Ave. Fort Wayne, IN; United States
- Coordinates: 41.08597°N 85.17843°W
- Owner: University of Saint Francis
- Operator: University of Saint Francis Athletics
- Capacity: 3,500
- Type: Stadium
- Surface: Sporturf (2004–present)
- Current use: Football; Soccer; Lacrosse

Construction
- Opened: 1998; 28 years ago

Tenants
- Saint Francis Cougars (NAIA) teams: football, soccer Fort Wayne FC (USL League Two) (2023–2025)

Website
- saintfranciscougars.com/bishop

Bishop John M. D’Arcy Stadium is a 3,500-seat stadium in Fort Wayne, Indiana. The facility is located on the campus of the University of Saint Francis and is named in honor of bishop John Michael D'Arcy, who served as diocesan bishop of the Diocese of Fort Wayne-South Bend, Indiana.

The stadium is primarily used for American football and soccer. It is home to the Saint Francis Cougars football, soccer, and lacrosse teams, as well as Fort Wayne FC of USL League Two.

The facility opened in 1998 when the Cougars played their first season of football. At that time, it was referred to as "Cougar Stadium". In 2003, the stadium was given its present name to honor the then-current bishop of the local Catholic diocese, John M. D'Arcy.

== Major renovations ==
In 2004, the field at the stadium became the first collegiate field in Indiana to utilize Sporturf. The innovative surface is said to be faster and safer than artificial surfaces previously used at sports venues.

In 2012, lights were added to the stadium thanks to the generosity of local businessman Bruce Dye.

== Stadium facilities ==
=== Tom Jehl Football Complex ===
Located under the west side (home) stands, the Tom Jehl Football Complex is a building that houses the home locker room and the offices for the football program. The complex was named after local businessman and benefactor Thomas Jehl.

=== Kevin Donley Field ===
On September 23, 2006, in pregame ceremonies to recognize a lifetime of coaching achievements, Saint Francis named its football field after Head Coach Kevin Donley.
