= Kay Brown =

Kay Brown may refer to:

- Kay B. Barrett (1902–1995), née Brown, American Hollywood talent scout and agent
- Kay Brown (artist) (1932–2012), African American artist
- Kay Brown (politician) (born 1948), American politician and educator
- Kay Brown (singer) (1933–2022), American singer
