= Lois Kingsbery Mayes =

American newspaper publisher

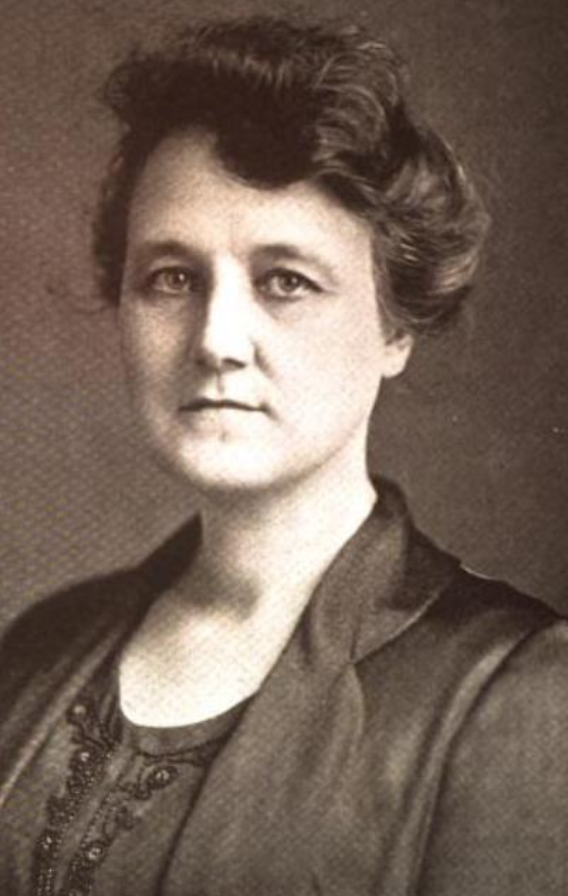
- Lois Kingsbery Mayes, from Men of the South (1922)
- Born: Lois Kingsbery; July 16, 1877; Hartford, South Dakota, U.S.
- Died: February 19, 1958 (aged 80); Pensacola, Florida, U.S.
- Other names: Educator, newspaper publisher

Lois Kingsbery Mayes Tanner (July 16, 1877 – February 19, 1958) was an American newspaper editor and publisher. She was publisher of the Pensacola Journal from 1913 to 1922, and was active in Democratic Party politics at the state and national levels, and held statewide positions in the Florida Federation of Women's Clubs.

== Early life ==
Kingsbery was born in Hartford, South Dakota and raised in Lafayette, Indiana, the daughter of Ira Carlos Kingsbery and Lu Asenath Curtis Kingsbery. She trained as a teacher at Dakota Wesleyan University.

== Career ==
After teaching school, Kingsbery worked as a stenographer and as a housekeeper. She began publishing The Pensacola Journal newspaper in Florida in 1915, continuing her late husband's work. She was president of the West Florida Press Association, president of the Florida State Press Association, and a director of the Southern Newspaper Publishers' Association, one of only three women members of the association in 1920.

Mayes sold the Pensacola Journal in 1922. "During the eight years that I owned the Pensacola Journal," she wrote in 1925, "there were from four to six women on the staff all of the time. I like to work with women. They know, or can see, the advantages of being systematic. Their intuitions are dependable, and their perceptions keen." She attended the World Press Congress in Geneva in 1926.

In 1917, Mayes was on the committee to establish a Red Cross chapter in Pensacola. She was a member of the Democratic National Committee, representing Florida for twelve years. In 1928, she was a member of the board of directors of the Woman's National Democratic Club. She was also active in the leadership of the Florida Federation of Women's Clubs. In the 1930s, she lived with her daughter in Washington, D.C., and was active in the city's Florida State Society.

== Personal life ==
Lois Kingsbery married Frank A. Mayes in 1899. They had four children before he died in 1915. Both of her parents died in 1921. She remarried in 1927, to school principal Burton S. Tanner. She died in 1958, in Pensacola, aged 80 years.
