= Mike Lightfoot =

American basketball coach

Biographical details
- Education: Bethel College

Playing career
- 1975-1978: Bethel College

Coaching career (HC unless noted)
- 1987–2017: Bethel College

Administrative career (AD unless noted)
- 1987-2004: Bethel College

Head coaching record
- Overall: 794–285 (.736)

Accomplishments and honors

Championships
- 3x NAIA Division II National Champions (1995, 1997, 1998); 4x NCCAA National Champions (1992, 1993, 2000, 2007); 11x NCCAA Regional Champions (1988, 1989, 1990, 1991, 1992, 1993, 2000, 2003, 2004, 2005, 2007); 18x Mid Central Conference/Crossroads League champions

Awards
- 6x National Coach of the Year; 24x Midwest region coach of the year; NAIA Hall of Fame; NCCAA Hall of Fame; Bethel College Hall of Fame; Marian High School Hall of Fame; National Small College Hall of Fame; Indiana Basketball Hall of Fame

Mike Lightfoot is an American retired college basketball coach known for his career at Bethel College. He was Bethel's men's basketball coach from 1987 to 2017. Coach Lightfoot also won more games than any other college basketball coach in the history of the state of Indiana, passing the likes of Bob Knight and Gene Keady. Lightfoot retired at the end of the 2016–17 season. He was inducted into the NAIA Hall of Fame in 2009 with John Wooden. Lightfoot currently works for the Nations of Coaches as a regional director and the ACC Network as a color commentator for basketball.

Wins by a basketball coach when coaching in the state of Indiana:

Wins	Coach	School
794	Mike Lightfoot	Bethel College
788	Jim Kessler	Grace
734	Paul Patterson	Taylor
659	Bob Knight	Indiana University
512	Gene Keady	Purdue

== Personal life ==
He coached both of his sons, Robbie and Ryne, at Bethel College. Robbie is the creator of Box out sports graphic and Ryne is the assistant coach for Florida Atlantic University. He and his wife Jacci have been married for 48 years

== See also ==
- List of college men's basketball coaches with 600 wins
