= 2001 NCAA Division II men's basketball tournament =

- Teams: 48
- Finals site: Centennial Garden, Bakersfield, California
- Champions: Kentucky Wesleyan (8th title)
- Runner-up: Washburn (1st title game)
- Semifinalists: Tampa (1st Final Four); Western Washington (1st Final Four)
- Winning coach: Ray Harper (2nd title)
- MOP: Lorico Duncan (Kentucky Wesleyan)

The 2001 NCAA Division II men's basketball tournament was the 45th annual single-elimination tournament to determine the national champion of men's NCAA Division II college basketball in the United States.

Officially culminating the 2000–01 NCAA Division II men's basketball season, the tournament featured forty-eight teams from around the country.

The Elite Eight, national semifinals, and championship were played, for the first time, at the Centennial Garden in Bakersfield, California.

After losing in the previous year's final, Kentucky Wesleyan (31–3) defeated Washburn in the final, 72–63, to win their record eighth Division II national championship. It was additionally their second title in three years and fourth consecutive appearance in the title game.

The Panthers were coached by Ray Harper. Kentucky Wesleyan's Lorico Duncan was the Most Outstanding Player.

2001 NCAA Division II Men's sites - regionals (cyan) Elite Eight (red)

== Regionals ==
=== Northeast - Garden City, New York ===
Location: Woodruff Hall Host: Adelphi University

First round Round of 48; March 8
4 | Philadelphia | 90
5 | Saint Anselm | 77
3 | UMass Lowell | 85
6 | Queens (NY) | 67

Regional semifinals Round of 32; March 9
1 | Adelphi | 87
4 | Philadelphia | 66
2 | Saint Michael's | 80
3 | UMass Lowell | 69

Regional final Sweet 16; March 10
1 | Adelphi | 78
2 | Saint Michael's | 64

=== South - St. Petersburg, Florida ===
Location: MacArthur Physical Education Center Host: Eckerd College

First round Round of 48; March 8
4 | Tampa | 83
5 | Kentucky State | 68
3 | West Georgia | 57
6 | Henderson State | 68

Regional semifinals Round of 32; March 9
1 | Eckerd | 56
4 | Tampa | 67
2 | Florida Southern | 64
6 | Henderson State (OT) | 69

Regional final Sweet 16; March 10
4 | Tampa | 60
6 | Henderson State | 51

=== Great Lakes - Owensboro, Kentucky ===
Location: Sportscenter Host: Kentucky Wesleyan College

First round Round of 48; March 8
4 | Gannon | 58
5 | Hillsdale | 60
3 | Northern Kentucky | 106
6 | Grand Valley State | 102

Regional semifinals Round of 32; March 9
1 | Kentucky Wesleyan (OT) | 73
5 | Hillsdale | 71
2 | Southern Indiana | 92
3 | Northern Kentucky | 93

Regional final Sweet 16; March 10
1 | Kentucky Wesleyan | 59
3 | Northern Kentucky | 57

=== North Central - St. Cloud, Minnesota ===
Location: Halenbeck Hall Host: St. Cloud State University

First round Round of 48; March 9
4 | South Dakota State | 80
5 | Metro State | 91
3 | Southwest Minnesota State | 88
6 | Winona State | 77

Regional semifinals Round of 32; March 10
1 | St. Cloud State | 100
5 | Metro State | 61
2 | Fort Hays State | 63
3 | Southwest Minnesota State | 82

Regional final Sweet 16; March 11
1 | St. Cloud State | 65
3 | Southwest Minnesota State | 67

=== South Atlantic - Charlotte, North Carolina ===
Location: Brayboy Gymnasium Host: Johnson C. Smith University

First round Round of 48; March 8
4 | Wingate | 88
5 | Armstrong Atlantic State | 67
3 | Catawba | 84
6 | Augusta State | 96

Regional semifinals Round of 32; March 9
1 | Johnson C. Smith | 92
4 | Wingate | 60
2 | Winston-Salem State | 65
6 | Augusta State | 48

Regional final Sweet 16; March 10
1 | Johnson C. Smith | 64
2 | Winston-Salem State | 52

=== South Central - Topeka, Kansas ===
Location: Lee Arena Host: Washburn University

First round Round of 48; March 8
4 | West Texas A&M | 67
5 | St. Mary's (TX) | 55
3 | Northeastern State | 80
6 | Angelo State | 75

Regional semifinals Round of 32; March 9
1 | Washburn | 86
4 | West Texas A&M | 81
2 | Northwest Missouri State | 62
3 | Northeastern State | 60

Regional final Sweet 16; March 10
1 | Washburn | 67
2 | Northwest Missouri State | 61

=== East - Fort Mill, South Carolina ===
Location: Hornets Training Facility Host: Queens College, with support from the NBA Charlotte Hornets

First round Round of 48; March 8
4 | West Chester | 95
5 | Longwood | 103
3 | Salem International | 77
6 | Clarion | 72

Regional semifinals Round of 32; March 9
1 | Queens (NC) | 77
5 | Longwood | 76
2 | Charleston | 70
3 | Salem International | 88

Regional final Sweet 16; March 10
1 | Queens (NC) | 81
3 | Salem International | 67

=== West - Bellingham, Washington ===
Location: Haggen Court at Sam Carver Gymnasium Host: Western Washington University

First round Round of 48; March 8
4 | Cal State Bakersfield | 99
5 | Humboldt State | 88
3 | Seattle Pacific | 95
6 | Central Washington | 101

Regional semifinals Round of 32; March 9
1 | Western Washington (OT) | 95
4 | Cal State Bakersfield | 86
2 | Cal State San Bernardino | 79
6 | Central Washington | 74

Regional final Sweet 16; March 10
1 | Western Washington | 58
2 | Cal State San Bernardino | 55

== Elite Eight - Bakersfield, California ==
Location: Bakersfield Centennial Garden Host: California State University, Bakersfield

National Quarterfinals; Elite Eight; March 21
GL | Kentucky Wesleyan | 85
NC | SW Minnesota State | 66
S | Tampa | 82
NE | Adelphi | 68
Bakersfield, California
SC | Washburn | 70
SA | Johnson C. Smith | 64
W | Western Washington | 89
E | Queens (NC) | 85

National semifinals Final Four; March 22
GL | Kentucky Wesleyan | 85*
S | Tampa | 84
SC | Washburn | 96
W | Western Washington | 90

National championship March 24
GL | Kentucky Wesleyan | 72
SC | Washburn | 63

== All-tournament team ==
- Lorico Duncan, Kentucky Wesleyan (MOP)
- Marshall Sanders, Kentucky Wesleyan
- Ewan Auguste, Washburn
- Ryan Murphy, Washburn
- Sylvere Bryan, Washburn

== See also ==
- 2001 NCAA Division II women's basketball tournament
- 2001 NCAA Division I men's basketball tournament
- 2001 NCAA Division III men's basketball tournament
- 2001 NAIA Division I men's basketball tournament
- 2001 NAIA Division II men's basketball tournament
