= 2013 NAIA Division II men's basketball tournament =

College basketball tournament

- Teams: 32
- Finals site: Keeter Gymnasium; Point Lookout, Missouri
- Champions: Cardinal Stritch Wolves (1st title, 1st title game, 1st Fab Four)
- Runner-up: William Penn Statesmen (1st title game, 1st Fab Four)
- Semifinalists: Grace Lancers (2nd Fab Four); Indiana Southeast Grenadiers (1st Fab Four)
- Charles Stevenson Hustle Award: Nick Ford (Cardinal Stritch)
- Chuck Taylor MVP: Darren Moore (Cardinal Stritch)
- Top scorer: Nathane Simniok (College of the Ozarks) (58 points)

The 2013 NAIA Division II Men’s Basketball national championship was held in March at Keeter Gymnasium in Point Lookout, Missouri. The 22nd annual NAIA basketball tournament featured thirty-two teams playing in a single-elimination format. The championship game was won by Cardinal Stritch University over William Penn University by a score of 73 to 59.

== Tournament field ==
The 2013 tournament field was announced on March 5. The field was made up of 23 automatic qualifiers and eight at-large bids and one automatic host bid presented to College of the Ozarks. This tournament field welcomed four newcomers, Madonna (Michigan), Rochester (Michigan), Saint Xavier (Illinois) and Valley City State (North Dakota).

== Highlights ==
=== First round ===
With five players scoring in double figures, including Roosevelt Green with eighteen, sixth seeded St. Xavier's dominated St. Mary's in first round action by a score of 82-60.

=== Elite Eight ===
Derek Semenas and Darren Moore both scored eighteen, and Moore pulled in eleven rebounds as second seed Cardinal Stritch defeated Dordt 82-76 in double overtime.

=== Championship game ===
Stritch won their first ever national championship 73-59 over William Penn on an impressive 21 point, seven rebound performance by Darren Moore.

== Bracket ==
First round March 6–7
1	William Penn (Iowa) (31-1)	71
McPherson (Kan.) (15-18)	65
16	Embry-Riddle (Fla.) (25-9)	49
Bethel (Ind.) (24-9)	73
9	Davenport (Mich.) (27-7)	77
York (Neb.) (24-8)	78 (OT)
8	8 Eastern Oregon (28-5)	53
Midland (Neb.) (20-12)	77
5	Warner Pacific (Ore.) (27-7)	80
Dakota State (S.D.) (23-9)	89
St. Thomas (Fla.) (21-11)	85
12	Mount Mercy (Iowa) (27-6)	72
13	Tennessee Wesleyan (25-8)	69
Grace (Ind.) (22-9)	93
4	Northwestern (Iowa) (24-7)	54
Cal Maritime (25-6)	76
3	Northwood (Fla.) (30-4)	49
College of the Ozarks (Mo.) (22-12)	57
14	Madonna (Mich.) (24-9)	66
Southern Oregon (25-8)	83
11	Indiana Southeast (28-4)	75
Valley City State (N.D.) (21-9)	72
6	Saint Xavier (Ill.) (29-5)	82
Saint Mary (Kan.) (22-9)	60
7	Indiana Wesleyan (26-6)	62
Lourdes (Ohio) (22-10)	60 (OT)
10	Dordt (Iowa) (27-6)	79
Northwest (Wash.) (22-11)	59
15	Rochester (Mich.) (20-5)	50
Bellevue (Neb.) (24-10)	64
2	Cardinal Stritch (Wis.) (31-3)	74
Jamestown (N.D.) (15-19)	56

Second round March 9
1	William Penn (Iowa)	101
Bethel (Ind.)	84
York (Neb.)	71 (OT)
Midland (Neb.)	76
Dakota State (S.D.)	61
St. Thomas (Fla.)	60
Grace (Ind.)	72
Cal Maritime	53
College of the Ozarks (Mo.)	76
Southern Oregon	59
11	Indiana Southeast	83
6	Saint Xavier (Ill.)	73
7	Indiana Wesleyan	62
10	Dordt (Iowa)	75
Bellevue (Neb.)	56
2	Cardinal Stritch	81

Quarterfinals; March 9
1	William Penn (Iowa)	67
Midland (Neb.)	66
Grace (Ind.)	72
Dakota State (S.D.)	59
College of the Ozarks (Mo.)	60
11	Indiana Southeast	75
10	Dordt (Iowa)	76
2	Cardinal Stritch (Wis.)	82

Semifinals; March 11
1	William Penn (Iowa)	79
Grace (Ind.)	58
3	Indiana Southeast	56
2	Cardinal Stritch (Wis.)	69

National championship March 12
1	William Penn (Iowa)	59
2	Cardinal Stritch (Wis.)	73

== Tourney awards and honors ==
- Dr. James Naismith/Emil Liston Team Sportsmanship Award: California State University-Maritime

=== Individual recognition ===
- Most Outstanding Player: Darren Moore, Cardinal Stritch
- Championship Hustle Award: Nick Ford, Cardinal Stritch
- NABC/NAIA Division II Coach of the Year: Drew Diener, Cardinal Stritch
- Rawlings-NAIA Division II National Coach of the Year: Drew Diener, Cardinal Stritch
- 2014 NAIA Division II Men’s Basketball All-Championship Team

Name	School
Cameron Mitchell	Indiana University Southeast
Brandon Beasley	William Penn
Keith Steffeck	William Penn
Derek Semenas	Cardinal Stritch
Greg Miller	Grace
Bruce Grimm Jr.	Grace
Trevor Wolterstorff	Dordt
James Parrott	Midland
John Lamb	Dakota State
Nathane Simniok	College of the Ozarks

=== Statistical leaders ===
(minimum 4 games)

Category	Player	School	Tally
Most points	Keith Steffeck	William Penn	94
Most points per game	Keith Steffeck	William Penn	18.8
Leading rebounder	Brandon Beasley	William Penn	66
Leading rebounder per game	Brandon Beasley	William Penn	13.2
Most assists	Nick Ford	Cardinal Stritch	31
Assists per game	Nick Ford	Cardinal Stritch	6.2
Assist/Turnover ratio	Brandon Vanderhegghen	Grace	5.0
Three-pointers made	Taylor Stoutner	William Penn	17
Best overall field goal percentage	Darren Moore	Cardinal Stritch	66.0% (53-60)
Best 3-point field goal percentage	Elliot Smith	Grace	57.1% (12-21)
Most free throws made	James Devlin	William Penn	24
Most free throws attempted	Brandon Beasley	William Penn	29
Best free throw percentage	James Devlin	William Penn	96.0% (24-25)
Most steals	Brandon Beasley	William Penn	12
Most steals per game	Brandon Beasley	William Penn	5.25
Most shots blocked	Keith Steffeck	William Penn	10
Most shots blocked per game	Keith Steffeck	William Penn	2.0

== See also ==
- 2013 NAIA Division I men's basketball tournament
- 2013 NCAA Division I men's basketball tournament
- 2013 NCAA Division II men's basketball tournament
- 2013 NCAA Division III men's basketball tournament
- 2013 NAIA Division II women's basketball tournament
