= Saint Francis Cougars =

- University: University of Saint Francis
- Nickname: Cougars
- NAIA: Division I
- Conference: Crossroads (primary), MSFA (football)
- Athletic director: Mike McCaffrey
- Location: Fort Wayne, Indiana
- Varsity teams: 19
- Football stadium: Bishop John M. D'Arcy Stadium
- Basketball arena: Hutzell Athletic Center
- Baseball stadium: Coug Field
- Colors: Royal Blue and White
- Website: saintfranciscougars.com
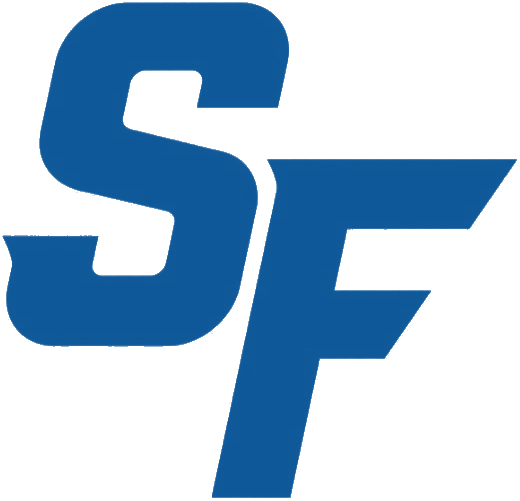

The Saint Francis Cougars are the athletic teams that represent the University of Saint Francis, located in Fort Wayne, Indiana, in intercollegiate sports as a member of the National Association of Intercollegiate Athletics (NAIA), primarily competing in the Crossroads League (formerly known as the Mid-Central College Conference (MCCC) until after the 2011–12 school year) for most of its sports since the 1994–95 academic year (which they were a member on a previous stint from 1966–67 to 1980–81); while its football team competes in the Mideast League of the Mid-States Football Association (MSFA).

== Varsity teams ==
USF competes in 19 intercollegiate varsity sports:

Men's sports	Women's sports
Baseball	Basketball
Basketball	Cross country
Cross country	Flag football
Football	Golf
Golf	Soccer
Soccer	Softball
Tennis	Tennis
Track and field^{1}	Track and field^{1}
	Volleyball
Co-ed sports
Esports
^{1} – includes both indoor and outdoor

=== Basketball ===
The University of Saint Francis Cougars won their first NAIA Championship on March 16, 2010. The Cougars won the 2010 NAIA Men's Division II basketball tournament when they defeated Walsh University 67–66 at Pt. Lookout, Missouri. The Cougars entered the tourney as the 15th seed. For his success, head coach Jeff Rekeweg was named the 2010 NAIA National Coach of the Year. On April 19, 2010, after 14 seasons of guiding the Cougars, Rekeweg resigned to take the head coaches position at Northwood University, an NCAA Division II school located in Midland, Michigan.

The Cougars returned the following year to play in the championship game on March 15, 2011. That year, the Cougars were runners-up in the 2011 NAIA Men's Division II basketball tournament when the Cougars were defeated by Cornerstone (MI) 80–71. The Cougars entered the tourney as the 13th seed.

In 2021 The Cougars once again made a run at the National Title in the NAIA's first year with one single division. The Cougars were awarded a first round bye after finishing as runner-up in the 2021 Crossroads League Tournament, and entered the round of 32. There they defeated Benedictine (KS), 73–65. In the round of 16, the Cougars defeated Stillman (AL), before a come from behind victory against fellow conference foe, Bethel (IN). In the Final Four, their fifth appearance since 2010, they fell just short against eventual champion Shawnee State.

=== Football ===
Saint Francis named Kevin Donley the Cougars' head coach in 1997. After a year of preparation, Saint Francis began play, as Fort Wayne's first collegiate football program, in the 1998 season. Coach Donley led USF to a record of 2-8 (.200), their first and only losing football season.

Since that initial season, Saint Francis has risen to become one of the top programs in all of NAIA football. From the 1999 season through the 2013 season, Donley-led teams have lost three or fewer games each season. Eight teams have completed undefeated regular seasons (2002–2006, 2008, 2015, 2017), and three consecutive teams finished as national runners-up (2004–2006).

The Cougars made a fourth appearance in the national championship game in 2016, winning their first NAIA national title with their 38–17 win over Baker (KS) in the 2016 NAIA Football National Championship. The following season, 2017, the Cougars returned a 5th time and successfully defended their title by defeating Reinhardt (GA) by a score of 24–13 in the 2017 NAIA Football National Championship. The Cougars completed a 14–0 undefeated season. This was only the 5th time in NAIA history that the back-to-back championships has occurred.

== National championship appearances ==
- denotes champions

Year	Sport	Competition	Result	Score	Opponent	Ref.
1999	Basketball (women's)	National championship	Lost	65-80	Shawnee State (OH)	
2004	Football	National championship	Lost	13–15	Carroll (MT)	
2005	Football	National championship	Lost	10–27	Carroll (MT)	
2006	Football	National championship	Lost	19–23	Sioux Falls (SD)	
2010	Basketball (men's)	National championship	Won	67-66	Walsh (OH)	
2011	Basketball (men's)	National championship	Lost	71–80	Cornerstone (MI)	
2014	Basketball (women's)	National championship	Won	68–75	College of the Ozarks (MO)	
2016	Basketball (men's)	National championship	Lost	66–69	Indiana Wesleyan	
2016	Football	National championship	Won	38-17	Baker (KS)	
2017	Football	National championship	Won	24-13	Reinhardt (GA)	
2018	Basketball (men's)	National championship	Lost	84–71	Indiana Wesleyan	
