= Kay Brown (politician) =

American educator and politician

Kay Brown (born October 5, 1948) was an American educator and politician.

Brown graduated from Dakota Wesleyan University with a bachelor's degree in education. She was a high school teacher and served as vice-president of development for Yankton College. In 1984, she moved to Northfield, Minnesota and served as the executive director of the Northfield Arts Guild. She was a partner in D.H. Gustafson and Kay Brown Associates, a consulting firm focusing on affordable housing. Brown served in the Minnesota House of Representatives in 1993 and 1994, representing district 25A, and was a Democrat.
