= Embry–Riddle Eagles =

American college athletics program

Coordinates: 29.18857°N 81.04871°W

- University: Embry–Riddle Aeronautical University
- Nickname: Eagles
- NCAA: Division II
- Conference: Sunshine State (primary)
- Athletic director: Rachel Burleson
- Location: Daytona Beach, Florida
- Varsity teams: 20 (9 men's, 10 women's, 1 co-ed)
- Basketball arena: ICI Center
- Baseball stadium: Sliwa Stadium
- Softball stadium: Radiology Associates Field
- Soccer stadium: ERAU Soccer Stadium
- Lacrosse stadium: Embry-Riddle Lacrosse Field
- Tennis venue: Crotty Tennis Complex
- Colors: Unrivaled Blue, Stratus White, and Sunrise Yellow
- Mascot: Ernie
- Website: erauathletics.com
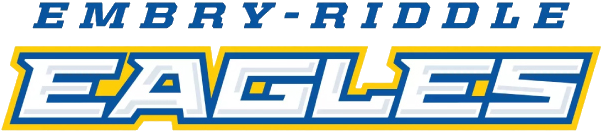

Team NCAA championships
- 1

The Embry–Riddle Eagles are the athletic teams that represent Embry–Riddle Aeronautical University, located in Daytona Beach, in intercollegiate sports as a member of the NCAA Division II ranks, primarily competing in the Sunshine State Conference (SSC) since the 2015–16 academic year for most of their sports. Men's and women's indoor track and field teams compete in the Peach Belt Conference (PBC) as associate members. Their club hockey team plays in ACHA College Hockey South. Prior to joining the NCAA and the SSC, the Eagles competed in the National Association of Intercollegiate Athletics (NAIA) as a founding member of the Sun Conference (formerly known as the Florida Sun Conference) from 1990 to 2015.

== History ==
Daytona Beach-based Embry–Riddle began its athletics program in the 1988–89 school year with baseball, men's basketball, and men's tennis and now sponsors 22 intercollegiate sports. In 2013, Embry–Riddle announced their intention to transition from the NAIA into NCAA Division II athletics and accepted an invitation in 2014 to join the Sunshine State Conference, effective in the 2015–16 school year. Embry–Riddle was granted full NCAA Division II membership on July 14, 2017, and are now eligible to compete for regular and post season championships.

=== Sun Conference: 1990–2015 ===
Embry–Riddle enjoyed great success in the NAIA and The Sun Conference, winning 104 Sun Conference regular season titles, 32 conference tournament crowns, 29 individual national titles, as well as team national championships in men's basketball (2000) and men's tennis (2013). Embry–Riddle's student-athletes have also proven to be very successful in the classroom, as evidenced by the 321 NAIA scholar-athletes and 80 CoSIDA Academic All-Americans since 1990. Embry–Riddle has had 59 of those CoSIDA Academic All-Americans come since 2010, which is the 11th-highest total among NCAA schools across all three divisions.

== Varsity teams ==
ERAU–Daytona Beach competes in 22 intercollegiate varsity sports: Men's sports include baseball, basketball, cross country, golf, lacrosse, rowing, soccer, tennis and track & field (indoor and outdoor); while women's sports include basketball, cross country, golf, lacrosse, rowing, soccer, softball, tennis, track & field (indoor and outdoor) and volleyball; and co-ed sports include cheerleading.

Men's sports	Women's sports
Baseball	Basketball
Basketball	Cross country
Cross country	Golf
Golf	Lacrosse
Lacrosse	Rowing
Rowing	Soccer
Soccer	Softball
Tennis	Tennis
Track & field^{†}	Track & field^{†}
	Volleyball
† – Track and field includes both indoor and outdoor.

=== Baseball ===
Embry–Riddle finished its NAIA affiliation with 1,058 wins, 15 Sun Conference regular season championships, six Sun Conference Tournament titles, 17 NAIA postseason appearances and 13 World Series trips (third-most all-time).

Embry–Riddle has had 22 Major League Baseball draft selections since the draft began in 1965.

Year	Player	Round	Team
1995	Robert Gray	25	Tigers
1996	Frank Thompson	40	Dodgers
1998	Doug Bridges	17	Angels
2000	Bryan Carter	42	Giants
2000	Luke Martin	34	Twins
2000	Brad Murray	27	White Sox
2002	Kevin Hawkins	35	Indians
2005	Kenny Holmberg	22	Brewers
2005	Patrick Ryan	19	Brewers
2007	Steven Otterness	29	Reds
2007	Brian Letko	19	Blue Jays
2008	Jordan Roberts	28	Dodgers
2009	Austin Goolsby	49	Giants
2010	Austin Goolsby	26	Orioles
2010	Jonathan Kountis	19	Mets
2011	Brandon Creath	44	Cardinals
2012	Ben Kline	32	Rays
2012	Adam Paulencu	26	Rockies
2013	Eric Green	36	Orioles
2014	Darryl Knight	14	Mets
2014	Daniel Ponce de Leon	9	Cardinals
2015	Zac Grotz	28	Astros
2015	Tyler Cyr	10	Giants

=== Men's basketball ===
The Eagles have won 9 regular season Sun Conference Titles, 11 Sun Conference Tournament Titles, have 17 NAIA Postseason Appearances, with 15 NAIA National Tournament Appearances, and one NAIA National Championship (1999–2000).

=== Men's tennis ===
The Embry–Riddle Eagles men's tennis team won the 2013 NAIA National Championship.

=== Track and field ===
The Embry–Riddle Eagles track and field program began in 2005. The men's program has had three individual national champions, won nine conference titles and finished fifth at the NAIA Indoor National Championships in 2009, while the women's program boasts 13 individual national championships and seven conference titles, as well as fourth-place finishes at both the NAIA Indoor and Outdoor National Championships in 2012.

== National championships ==
Association	Division	Sport	Year	Opponent/runner-up	Score
NAIA	Division II	Men's basketball	2000	College of the Ozarks	75–63
NAIA		Men's tennis	2013	Auburn Montgomery	5–4
NCAA	Division II	Women's rowing	2025	Cal Poly Humboldt	26 Points

== Facilities ==
=== ICI Center ===
The ICI Center, formerly known as University Fieldhouse, has been the home of the Embry–Riddle men's basketball and volleyball Eagles since 1995. The facility was completed in August 1995 with 51,511 gross square feet of space. In addition to serving as host to the basketball and volleyball teams, the ICI Center brings numerous events and assemblies throughout the year.

In December 2000, the athletic department opened the door to a new wing of the facility. The expansion on the north end of the ICI Center brought with it four new team locker rooms on the first floor. The second floor of the new edition is home to state-of-the art office space for the athletic department, giving each coach and administrator their own office as well a reception area, kitchen and meeting room.

The facility earned its current moniker in 2002 when Embry–Riddle dedicated the building in appreciation of a generous contribution to the university by Mori Hosseini, president and CEO of ICI Homes and one of the university's most dedicated alumni. ICI Center seats 1,968 spectators overall, including 600 permanent chair-back seats on its south sideline. The main arena features an Aacer Channel maple floor with two Daktronics LED message center scoreboards. The climate of ICI Center is controlled by an HVAC System served by Thermal "Ice" Storage, providing energy-efficient cooling. In addition to serving as the Eagles' home court and home to the athletic department offices, the facility also houses the Sports Medicine Office and a 3,200 square foot weight room/fitness center.

=== Sliwa Stadium ===
University Ballpark ushered in a new era for Embry–Riddle baseball in the spring of 2001. The ballpark allowed the Eagles, who racked up many miles traveling to DeLand and Jackie Robinson Ballpark for practices and games, to play their first game on campus. Six years later, University Ballpark received a new look and a new name. The facility, which was upgraded to include bleacher seating for 615 spectators, a press box and an entry way with 16-foot columns, was renamed Sliwa Stadium in recognition of the continued support of the Sliwa Family. During his tenure as Embry–Riddle's third president, Dr. Steven M. Sliwa established a lasting legacy of growth and prosperity that advanced the university's reputation as a world leader in aviation and aerospace education. The ballpark, which was completed in September 2000, is located behind the ICI Center and is one of the premier baseball facilities at the small college level.

=== Crotty Tennis Complex ===
The Ambassador E. William Crotty Tennis Complex opened on April 5, 2004, with a formal dedication ceremony by former ATP Tour tennis pro Tom Gullikson. The tennis complex features nine lighted tennis courts, three sets of bleachers for 50 spectators each, and an electronic scoreboard that can show set scores for six matches simultaneously. The facility has not only gained the attention of the Embry–Riddle campus, but in September 2004 the center earned national recognition as one of 15 facilities claiming the 2004 USTA Facility Awards. The USTA's Outstanding Facility Awards, now in its 23rd year, encourages higher standards for the construction and/or renovation of public tennis facilities throughout the country.

=== ERAU Soccer Stadium ===
Embry–Riddle invested in a major upgrade to the soccer complex prior to hosting the 2005 men's soccer national tournament and the results were a tremendously positive impact for the event, as well as both of the Eagle soccer programs. A completely new grandstand increased the seating from 350 to 1,000 with approximately 200 chair-back seats. An adjacent spectator amenities building at the east end of the field houses restrooms, a concession stand, ticket booth and storage area. Embry–Riddle hosted the 2005 and 2006 NAIA Men's Soccer National Championship, the 2007 NAIA Women's Soccer National Championship, and the 2008 NAIA Women's Soccer National Championship.
