= University of Saint Francis (Indiana) =

Private university in Fort Wayne, Indiana, U.S.

- Former name: Saint Francis College (1890–1998)
- Type: Private university
- Established: 1890 (details)
- Religious affiliation: Catholic Church (Sisters of St. Francis of Perpetual Adoration)
- President: Lance Richey (interim)
- Students: 1,903 (fall 2022)
- Undergraduates: 1,576 (fall 2022)
- Postgraduates: 327 (fall 2022)
- Location: Fort Wayne, Indiana, United States; 41°5′14.25″N 85°10′34.04″W
- Campus: 132 acres (53 ha); Suburban
- Colors: Royal Blue & White
- Nickname: Cougars
- Sporting affiliations: NAIA – Crossroads
- Website: sf.edu

The University of Saint Francis (USF) is a private Catholic university in Fort Wayne, Indiana, United States. The university promotes Catholic and Franciscan values. The school's 2022–23 enrollment was 1,903 undergraduate and graduate students, the majority of whom come from states in the Midwest, primarily Indiana, Michigan, Illinois, and Ohio.

== History ==
The University of Saint Francis was founded in Lafayette, Indiana, in 1890, when the Sisters of St. Francis of Perpetual Adoration founded Saint Francis Normal School, a teacher training school, to provide better training for members of the congregation teaching in parochial schools. It operated as a junior college until 1937, when it became a four-year school. The school became Saint Francis College in 1940.

The college moved to its current Fort Wayne location in 1944, to the estate of the former industrialist John H. Bass. Trinity Hall was completed in 1947. The school has remained in Fort Wayne and gradually expanded, adding a graduate school in 1960. Increased athletic programs for the Cougars, primarily football, as well as construction of athletic fields and residence halls and acquisition of the Lutheran College of Health Professions in the 1990s produced remarkable enrollment growth. It was renamed University of Saint Francis in 1998.

== Campus ==
The university's Fort Wayne campus covers 132 acres (0.53 km^{2}), with an additional 4.3 acres (1.7 ha) in downtown Fort Wayne and nearly 7 acres (2.8 ha) at the university's Crown Point campus in Crown Point, Indiana.

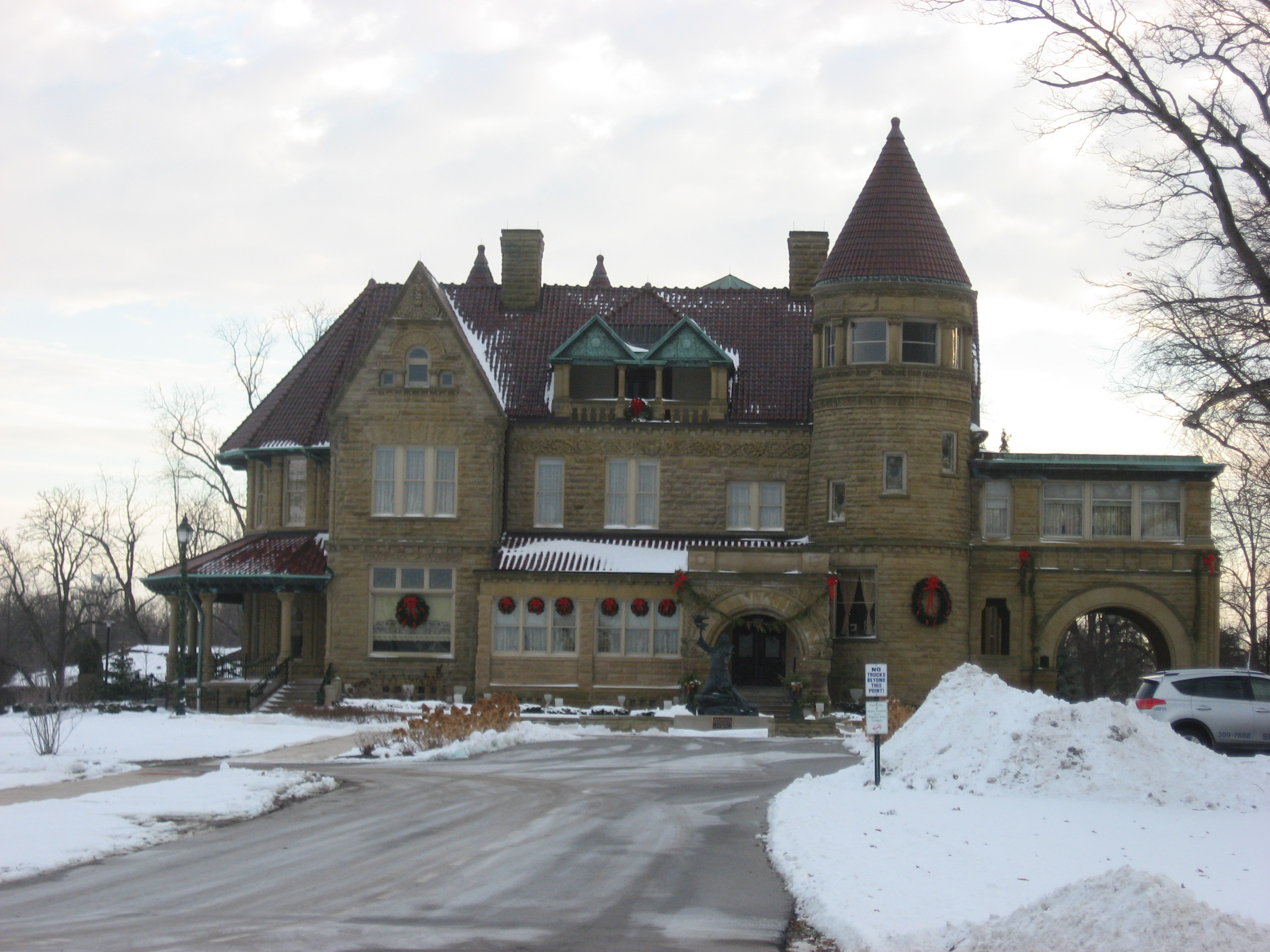
Brookside in 2014

- Brookside Mansion, a castle-like mansion that was originally the home of the John H. Bass family, is listed on the National Register of Historic Places. The building originally housed the entire college, and has served as the university's library, as well as dorms and a dining area. It is primarily used for offices. In 2009, the building was renovated, including interior and exterior touch-ups of the original artwork and design.
- The Pope John Paul II Center was completed in 200 and houses the Lee and Jim Vann Library, Registrar's Office, faculty offices, the Campus Shoppe, and classrooms.
- The Mimi and Ian Rolland Art and Visual Communication Cente is the former property of the Standard Oil warehouse, which had become polluted with oil residue. In 1999, the university—with a grant from the City of Fort Wayne and the State of Indiana—cleaned the ground, water, and surrounding area.
- The Achatz Hall of Science and John and Toni Murray Research Center is a science learning center.
- The Doermer Family Center for Health Science Education houses the College of Health Sciences is located within the Doermer Family Center for Health Sciences Education.
- Bishop John M. D’Arcy Stadium on the west side of the campus is home to the only collegiate football program in Fort Wayne and became the first collegiate field in Indiana to utilize Sporturf in 2004.
- The USF Robert Goldstine Performing Arts Center, formerly known as the Scottish Rite Auditorium, houses an auditorium for stage performances and other events.
- The university maintains a satellite site in Crown Point, Indiana, about 120 miles (190 km) northwest of the main campus in Fort Wayne. In 2021, USF Crown Point completed a $7 million expansion project, which doubled the size of the facility.

== Academics ==
Academic rankings

Regional
- U.S. News & World Report: 85

The university comprises the following:

- Division of Creative Arts
- College of Health Sciences
- College of Arts, Sciences and Business

The Division of Creative Arts is accredited by the National Association of Schools of Art and Design.

== Athletics ==
The Saint Francis (USF) athletic teams are called the Cougars. The university is a member of the National Association of Intercollegiate Athletics (NAIA), primarily competing in the Crossroads League (formerly known as the Mid-Central College Conference (MCCC) until after the 2011–12 school year) for most of its sports since the 1994–95 academic year (which they were a member on a previous stint from 1966–67 to 1980–81); while its football team competes in the Mideast League of the Mid-States Football Association (MSFA).

USF competes in 18 intercollegiate varsity sports: Men's sports include baseball, basketball, cross country, football, golf, soccer, tennis and track & field; while women's sports include basketball, cross country, golf, soccer, softball, tennis, track & field, volleyball, and flag football; and co-ed sports include cheerleading and eSports.

== Notable alumni ==
- James Bettcher, professional football coach
- Tom Henry, B.A., M.B.A, 35th mayor of Fort Wayne, Indiana
- Steve Yoder, M.S.E., 1970, men's basketball coach at Ball State University from 1977 to 1982
