= Bethel University (Indiana) =

Christian liberal arts college in Indiana, U.S.

- Bethel University
- Former name: Bethel College (1947–2019)
- Motto: With Christ at the Helm
- Type: Private university
- Established: 1947; 79 years ago
- Accreditation: HLC
- Religious affiliation: Missionary Church
- Academic affiliations: CCCU; CIC
- Endowment: $11.4 million
- President: Dee McDonald
- Students: 1,167
- Undergraduates: 1,065
- Postgraduates: 102
- Location: Mishawaka, Indiana, United States; 41.6777°N 86.1932°W
- Campus: Suburban: 75 acres (0.30 km^{2})
- Colors: Blue & white
- Nickname: Pilots
- Sporting affiliations: NAIA – Crossroads; NCCAA Division I – North Central
- Website: betheluniversity.edu

Bethel University is a private Christian university in Mishawaka, Indiana, United States. It was established in 1947 and is affiliated with the evangelical Christian Missionary Church.

== Organization and administration ==
Bethel is a part of the Council for Christian Colleges and Universities and the Council of Independent Colleges. It is regionally accredited by The Higher Learning Commission. The institution also has specialized accreditation by the National Council for Accreditation of Teacher Education (NCATE), National League for Nursing (NLNAC), National Association of Schools of Music (NASM), and International Accreditation Council for Business Education (IACBE).

Bethel is organized into three academic areas: Division of Arts & Sciences; Division of Humanities & Social Sciences; School of Nursing. Additionally, nine graduate programs are administered in conjunction with the schools through the Office of Adult and Graduate Studies.

There are approximately 1,339 students distributed across these programs. About 1,200 are traditional students pursuing bachelor's degrees right after high school. 140 are enrolled in graduate programs. The Bethel University faculty is composed of about 63 full-time members.

Bethel College changed its name to Bethel University upon the end of commencement exercises on May 5, 2019.

== Academics ==
Bethel University offers undergraduate, graduate and adult degree programs across the spectrum of disciplines that characterizes American higher education at small colleges. The traditional academic majors include a substantial general education component, which is typical of most liberal arts institutions. With some variation by major program, these students take courses in history, literature, philosophy, fine arts, communication (oral and written), psychology, sociology, science, mathematics, physical education, and foreign language. Because of the university's identification with Christianity, all students take courses in Bible (Old and New Testament) and an introductory theology course. These general education courses provide a broad background across the disciplines upon which more depth is pursued in a major (or majors).

== Athletics ==
The Bethel athletic teams are called the Pilots. The university is a member of the National Association of Intercollegiate Athletics (NAIA), primarily competing in the Crossroads League (formerly known as the Mid-Central College Conference (MCCC) until after spring 2012) for most of its sports since the 1981–82 academic year. Its men's and women's swimming & diving teams compete in the Kansas Collegiate Athletic Conference (KCAC), and its women's lacrosse and men's volleyball teams compete in the Wolverine–Hoosier Athletic Conference (WHAC). The school is also a member of the National Christian College Athletic Association (NCCAA), primarily competing as an independent in the North Central Region of the Division I level.

Bethel competes in 25 intercollegiate varsity sports. Men's sports include baseball, basketball, bowling, cross country, golf, soccer, swimming & diving, tennis, track & field (indoor and outdoor) and volleyball; women's sports include basketball, bowling, cross country, golf, lacrosse, soccer, softball, swimming & diving, tennis, track & field (indoor and outdoor) and volleyball; and co-ed sports include cheerleading and eSports.

The most recent sports added were men's and women's eSports and men's volleyball. Basketball, baseball, and softball games are broadcast by the Regional Radio Sports Network.

=== Athletic accomplishments ===
- 4 NAIA National Championships (3 Men's D-II Basketball, 1 Men's Soccer)
- 42 NCCAA National Championships
- 15 NAIA Individual National Champions (1 Women's Golf, 1 Men's Swim & Dive, 9 Men's Track, 4 Women's Track)
- 136 NAIA All-Americans
- 435 NAIA Scholar-Athletes
- 19 NAIA National Players of the Week
- 71 Conference Regular Season Championship

In addition to athletic competition, Bethel University encourages athletes to undertake short-term missionary work. Over 45 short-term missions trips/task force teams have been taken by teams within the athletic department.

== Notable people ==
- Andrew Clyde, member, U.S. House of Representatives
- Mike Lightfoot, college basketball coach
- Justin Masterson, professional baseball player
- Marci Miller, film and television actor
- Yemi Mobolade, mayor of Colorado Springs, Colorado
- Eric Stults, professional baseball player
