= Indiana University East =

Public university in Richmond, Indiana, U.S.

Coordinates: 39.867872°N 84.887586°W

- Other name: IU East or IUE
- Former name: Eastern Indiana Center of Earlham College (1967–1971)
- Type: Public regional baccalaureate college
- Established: 1967; 59 years ago
- Academic affiliations: Indiana University System
- Endowment: $4.67 million^{[1]}
- Chancellor: Dennis Rome
- President: Pamela Whitten (system)
- Faculty: 87 (full-time), 117 (part-time)
- Students: 3,490
- Undergraduates: 3,292
- Postgraduates: 198
- Location: Richmond, Indiana, United States
- Campus: large town: 174 acres (0.704 km²)
- Colors: Cream & Crimson
- Nickname: Red Wolves
- Sporting affiliations: NAIA – River States
- Website: east.iu.edu

Indiana University East (IU East or IUE) is a public university in Richmond, Indiana, a regional campus of Indiana University that serves the eastern Indiana and western Ohio area. Established in 1971 by the Indiana University Board of Trustees, IU East enrolls over 4,000 students on its five-building, 174-acre campus and in online classes. IU East has 60 academic degree programs, offering bachelor's and master's degree programs as well as certificates.

== History ==
Indiana University East grew out of an extension established at Earlham College that was operated cooperatively by Earlham and Indiana University. In 1967, the arrangement was expanded to include Purdue and Ball State Universities and the extension became the Eastern Indiana Center of Earlham College.

In 1969, Richmond citizens formed Eastern Indiana Community College, Inc., to raise funds for the construction of a new campus. After raising more than $1 million, members of the community college organization, with the consent of the four educational institutions involved in the center, asked Indiana University to establish a regional campus in Richmond and to assume responsibility for the operation.

The Indiana General Assembly approved this plan, and on July 1, 1971, the Eastern Indiana Center of Earlham College became Indiana University East, the sixth campus in the Indiana University regional system. On October 3, 1972, ground was broken at the new campus site north of Richmond. The first building, an all-purpose academic facility, was completed in late 1974 and dedicated February 23, 1975. IU East earned its first accreditation in 1975.

The Indiana University East campus included 225 acres (0.911 km^{2}) of land, purchased with community donations, on the northern edge of Richmond, Indiana. Of those 225 acres (0.91 km^{2}), 174 acres (0.70 km^{2}) are for IU East and 51 acres (0.21 km^{2}) are for other non-IU East post-secondary educational uses, such as Ivy Tech Community College.

Whitewater Hall opened in 1976 as the first of five buildings. This was followed by Hayes Hall in 1992, Middlefork Hall in 1995 (renamed Tom Raper Hall in 2009), Springwood Hall in 1999 and the Student Events and Activities Center in 2016.

Additionally, the IU East Henry County Danielson Learning Center in New Castle, Indiana was dedicated in May 1999 to serve the citizens of Henry County, Indiana. IU East offers degree programs off-campus at the Ivy Tech Community College in Lawrenceburg Riverfront Campus.

Recent chancellors include David Fulton, Nassar Paydar, Larry Richards (interim), Kathryn Girten, and Dennis Rome (current).

Since awarding its first bachelor's degrees in 1977, IU East has expanded its academic portfolio to include 60 bachelor's degree options and selected master's degrees. In 2017, IU East conferred its 10,000th degree.

== Academics ==
IU East is both a traditional campus and a virtual campus with select online degree completion programs. It offers over 60 degree programs at the bachelor's and master's degree levels.

=== Academic schools ===
Indiana University East is organized into five schools:

- School of Business and Economics, accredited by the Association of Collegiate Business Schools and Programs (ACBSP)
- School of Education, accredited by NCATE
- School of Humanities & Social Sciences
- School of Natural Science & Mathematics
- School of Nursing and Health Sciences

The university previously had a School of Social Work but it has closed.

== Athletics ==
The Indiana–East (IUE or IU East) athletic teams are called the Red Wolves (formerly known as the "Pioneers"). The university is a member of the National Association of Intercollegiate Athletics (NAIA), primarily competing in the River States Conference (RSC) since the 2007–08 academic year (when the school began its athletic program and joined the NAIA).

IU East competes in 17 intercollegiate varsity sports: Men's sports include basketball, cross country, golf, soccer, tennis and track & field (indoor and outdoor) and volleyball; while women's sports include basketball, cross country, golf, soccer, tennis, track & field (indoor and outdoor), and volleyball; and co-ed sports include eSports.

== Campus ==
IU East's campus lies on 174 acres (0.70 km^{2}) (0.704 km^{2}) of land on the northern edge of Richmond, Indiana, near Interstate 70. IU East, Ivy Tech, and Earlham College are the immediate area's largest colleges. IU East has five academic buildings, Springwood, Whitewater, Tom Raper, Hayes Halls and the Student Events and Activities Center, with more planned over coming years. There are no student housing dormitories on campus.

Whitewater Hall hosts Vivian Auditorium, the Campus Bookstore, and the Offices of Admissions, Financial Aid, Bursar and Registrar, English Department, The School of Natural Science and Mathematics, administration, and the Den, the campuses cafe. Hayes Hall opened in 1992 and houses the Campus Library, Information Technology, School of Nursing, School of Business and Economics, Center for Teaching & Learning, and Center for Health Promotion. Middlefork Hall houses the School of Humanities and Social Sciences including the art studios, the School of Education, School of Social Work and the Purdue University College of Technology programs. Middlefork Hall was renamed to Tom Raper Hall, in honor of a prominent donor. Springwood Hall is home to the Office of the Chancellor, the athletics program, Office of External Affairs, Campus Life office, Music program and studios, lastly the Graf Recreation Center. The Graf Recreation Center contains a coffee bar, Brewfus, a weight facility, and half-court basketball gym.

IU East campus is adjacent to another public college, the Richmond campus of the Ivy Tech Community College system.

== Notable faculty ==
- Mary Fell - Retired professor of English, chair of English Department, and poet
- Joanne Passet - Retired professor of U.S. History and Dean of the School of Humanities and Social Sciences, a Fulbright scholar in Vietnam, and researcher of U.S. Women's History
