= Cardinal Stritch University =

Roman Catholic university in Wisconsin, U.S.

Coordinates: 43°08′24″N 87°54′36″W

- Former names: St. Clare College (1937–1946); Cardinal Stritch College (1946–1997)
- Motto: Latin: Ut probetis potiora
- Motto in English: To value the better things
- Type: Private university
- Active: 1937–2023
- Religious affiliation: Sisters of St. Francis of Assisi (Roman Catholic)
- Academic affiliations: ACCU, AFCU, NAICU, CIC, WAICU
- Location: Milwaukee, Wisconsin, United States
- Campus: Suburban, 40 acres (16 ha)
- Colors: Red & white
- Nickname: Wolves
- Sporting affiliations: NAIA – CCAC
- Mascot: Wolfie
- Website: www.stritch.edu

Cardinal Stritch University was a private Catholic university with its primary campus in Fox Point and Glendale, Wisconsin, United States. Its enrollment as of fall 2021 was 1,365. (Note: A decrease from 2,345 during the 2019–2020 school year.) The university closed in May 2023 due to financial challenges and declining enrollment.

== History ==
Cardinal Stritch University was founded in 1937 as St. Clare College by the Sisters of St. Francis of Assisi on Milwaukee's south side as an institution to help the order's sisters effectively train as teachers. The sisters opened a reading clinic in 1943 to help promote literacy in the area; Cardinal Stritch University Literacy Centers still exist throughout the Milwaukee area.

In 1946, the college was renamed Cardinal Stritch College in honor of the Archdiocese of Milwaukee's Cardinal Samuel Stritch. The college opened its programs to lay women for the first time and was subsequently accredited by the North Central Association of Colleges and Schools in 1953.

Stritch established its first graduate program in 1956, offering majors in special education and reading. The university also opened its doors to men that year, becoming fully co-educational in 1970.

Stritch moved to a campus in the northern Milwaukee suburb of Fox Point in 1962. This new campus allowed the college to begin many new programs such as the nursing program in 1980 and its College of Business and Management in 1982.

Cardinal Stritch College was renamed Cardinal Stritch University in 1997. The university's first doctoral program (devoted to Leadership for the Advancement of Learning and Service) opened for enrollment the following year. A $14 million expansion and renovation of the university occurred in 2006 with the introduction of online degree programs.

In April 2023, university administrators announced that the university would close in May due to financial challenges and declining enrollment.

== Campus ==
The university was located on a 40-acre (16 ha) campus 9 miles (14 km) north of Milwaukee in the suburbs of Fox Point and Glendale, less than one mile (1.6 km) west of Lake Michigan. In July 2023 the campus was sold to the Ramirez Family Foundation for the construction of a new K-12 school. As of May 2024, most of the former university buildings were being demolished to be replaced with new ones. The gym, library, campus center, and fine arts buildings are slated to be retained.

== Academics ==
Cardinal Stritch University offered more than 60 fields of study throughout four colleges, with bachelor, master, and doctorate degrees.

== Athletics ==
The Cardinal Stritch athletic teams were called the Wolves. The university was a member of the National Association of Intercollegiate Athletics (NAIA), primarily competing in the Chicagoland Collegiate Athletic Conference (CCAC) since the 1997–98 academic year. The Wolves previously competed in the defunct Lake Michigan Conference of the NCAA Division III ranks from 1974–75 to 1996–97.

Cardinal Stritch competed in 13 intercollegiate varsity sports.

=== Basketball ===
The Cardinal Stritch men's basketball team won the Lake Michigan Conference men's basketball championship in 1987. The men's team was also five-time National Little College Athletic Association (now the United States Collegiate Athletic Association) Great Lakes District men's basketball champion from 1983 to 1987. The Cardinal Stritch men's basketball team won the NAIA Division II National Championship in 2013.

=== Track and field ===
In 2016, the men's indoor track and field team accomplished a first in Stritch history with a seventh-place finish at the NAIA indoor track and field nationals.

== Notable alumni ==
- James T. Harris, American radio personality
- Rosemary Hinkfuss, Wisconsin State Representative
- John E. McCoy, U.S. Air National Guard brigadier general
- Kimberla Lawson Roby, author
- Anthony Shumaker, Major League Baseball player

== Notable faculty ==
- Thomasita Fessler, painter and chair of the art department
- Tamara Grigsby, Wisconsin State Representative
- Yasmin Mogahed, author and first female instructor at the AlMaghrib Institute
- Marion Verhaalen, composer and musicologist
