= Keeter Gymnasium =

Arena in Point Lookout, Missouri, US

Coordinates: 36.620083°N 93.239328°W

- Interactive map of Keeter Gymnasium
- Address: College of the Ozarks; Lookout, Missouri; United States
- Seating type: 3500

Construction
- Opened: 1973

Memorial Fieldhouse and Keeter Gymnasium is a 3,500-seat arena for College of the Ozarks at Point Lookout, Missouri, United States.

The Fieldhouse, located at the corner of Cultural Court and Opportunity Avenue, like other buildings on the campus was built with student labor fulfilling their "Hard Work U" obligations of working instead of paying tuition.

From 2000-2017 it had been the home of the NAIA Division II National Championship basketball tournament. Significant improvements to the fieldhouse were made prior to the 2014 NAIA Men's Division II Basketball Tournament.

The arena was dedicated in 1973. It is named for college vice-president Howell W. Keeter.

The fieldhouse has three basketball courts, an Olympic-sized swimming pool, weight room, racquetball courts, dance studio, volleyball, badminton and table tennis facilities.

In 2009 a 21,888-square-foot (2,033.5 m^{2}) fitness center was added solving a practice problem for the men's and women's basketball teams. In the past men and women could not practice at the same time in the building.
