= Dakota Wesleyan University =

Methodist university in Mitchell, South Dakota, US

- Former name: Dakota University (1885–1904)
- Motto: Sacrifice or Service
- Type: Private university
- Established: 1885; 141 years ago
- Religious affiliation: Methodist
- Academic affiliations: IAMSCU; CIC; NAICU
- President: Daniel R. Kittle
- Students: 733
- Location: Mitchell, South Dakota, U.S.
- Colors: Royal Blue, Silver & White
- Nickname: Tigers
- Sporting affiliations: NAIA – GPAC
- Website: www.dwu.edu
- Dakota Wesleyan University
- U.S. National Register of Historic Places
- U.S. Historic district
- Location within South Dakota Location within the United States
- Location: 1200 West University Avenue, Mitchell, South Dakota 57301 (Campus property bounded by McGovern Ave., W. University Ave., Norway Ave., and McCabe St.)
- Coordinates: 43°41′55″N 98°1′51″W
- Built: structures in current use built between 1903 and 2022
- Architect: Wallace L. Dow (early campus structures)
- Architectural style: Classical Revival
- NRHP reference No.: 76001727
- Added to NRHP: December 22, 1976

Dakota Wesleyan University (DWU) is a private Methodist university in Mitchell, South Dakota, United States. It was founded in 1885 and is affiliated with the United Methodist Church. The student body averages slightly fewer than 800 students. The campus of the university is listed on the National Register of Historic Places.

== History ==
In 1883, a small band of Methodist settlers meeting in the Dakota Territory secured a charter to found the college as Dakota University. These pioneers were driven to "build a college of stone while living in houses of sod," and had deep religious convictions about the education and future of their children. They envisioned an institution that epitomized the highest in Christian thought and deed, and so adopted the motto, "Sacrifice or Service". This is symbolized in the collegiate seal of the altar, the ox, and the plow.

On October 14, 1904, the institution assumed its present name of Dakota Wesleyan University.

By 1920, Dakota Wesleyan University was the largest independent college in the state, with an enrollment of more than 300. The Great Depression, which hit the prairie harder than any region in the nation, evoked a regionally sensitive response from Dakota Wesleyan. The university accepted many students who had few or no resources, with farm produce being accepted for tuition, and personnel took severe cuts in pay to educate those with no other options. The university, which was sustained by the Methodist church as in earlier days, gave teachers housing in Graham Hall and coupons to purchase merchandise in town.

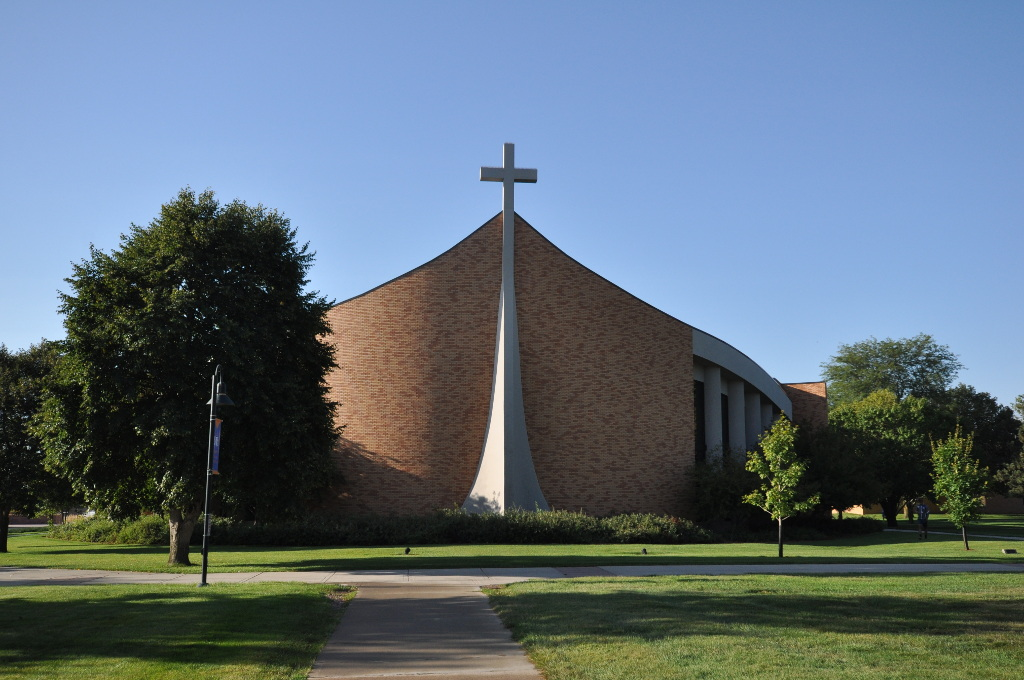
The main chapel

Since the 1930s, the university has continued its attempts to remedy region-specific needs. Strong programs in teacher education have provided new teachers for school districts, and nursing and allied health programs address the continuing need for health care professionals in rural South Dakota. In recognition of the diverse cultures in its changing prairie environment, Wesleyan has begun special programs focusing on Native American culture. Additionally, university programs assist students whose previous educational experiences have inadequately prepared them for their future.

About half of the campus, including its central U-shaped quadrangle, was listed on the National Register of Historic Places in 1976.

== George and Eleanor McGovern Library and Center ==
Dakota Wesleyan University dedicated the new George and Eleanor McGovern Library and Center for Leadership and Public Service on October 7, 2006, to a crowd of nearly five thousand people, with former President Bill Clinton honoring former Senator George McGovern and his wife Eleanor McGovern for their public service. Other dignitaries who spoke including former Senator Tom Daschle, Senator Tim Johnson, Senator John Thune, Representative Stephanie Herseth Sandlin, Governor Mike Rounds, and USA Today founder Al Neuharth.

The McGovern Center seeks to prepare Dakota Wesleyan's top students for future leadership and careers in public service through classes, seminars, research, and internships. It also includes the annual McGovern Center Conference, the McGovern Library, and the McGovern Legacy Museum, which gives visitors a look at the lives of the couple. It is also associated with the DWU Tiger Poll which does public opinion polling.

== Athletics ==
The Dakota Wesleyan athletic teams are called the Tigers. The university is a member of the National Association of Intercollegiate Athletics (NAIA), primarily competing in the Great Plains Athletic Conference (GPAC) since the 2000–01 academic year. The Tigers previously competed in the defunct South Dakota Intercollegiate Conference (SDIC) from 1948–49 to 1999–2000.

Dakota Wesleyan competes in 18 intercollegiate varsity sports: Men's sports include baseball, basketball, cross country, football, golf, soccer, track & field and wrestling; while women's sports include basketball, cross country, golf, soccer, softball, track & field, volleyball and wrestling; and co-ed sports include cheerleading and dance.

=== Men's basketball ===
In 2015, the men's basketball team won runner-up in the 2015 NAIA Division II men's basketball tournament.

Also in 2015, Jesse Taylor, a basketball player at Dakota Wesleyan, came out as gay, making him South Dakota's first openly gay college athlete.

=== Women's basketball ===
On March 13, 2018, the women's basketball team won the first team National Championship in school history, defeating the Concordia Lady Bulldogs 82–59 in regulation play in the championship round of the 2018 NAIA Division II women's basketball tournament.

== Notable alumni ==
- Clinton Presba Anderson, former U.S. Secretary of Agriculture, former U.S. Senator and U.S. Congressman from New Mexico
- Jonathan Bane, American football player
- Gordon Binkerd, American composer
- Kay Brown, Minnesota state legislator
- Harlan J. Bushfield, 16th governor of South Dakota and United States senator
- Francis Case, former U.S. congressman from South Dakota
- Freda DeKnight, food editor for Ebony Magazine and cookbook author
- Stanley Hallett, American urban planner and neighborhood advocate
- Oscar Howe, Yanktoni Dakota artist
- Ben Jukich, professional baseball pitcher
- Lois Kingsbery Mayes, newspaper publisher and Florida clubwoman
- George McGovern, former U.S. congressman, U.S. Senator, and Democratic Party presidential candidate
- Ed Meierkort, former head coach of the South Dakota Coyotes football team
- George Theodore Mickelson, former governor of South Dakota
- Ralph Siewert, former NBA player
