= Briar Cliff University =

Franciscan university in Sioux City, Iowa, US

Coordinates: 42.529601°N 96.423227°W

- Former name: Briar Cliff College (1930–2001)
- Type: Private university
- Established: 1930
- Religious affiliation: Roman Catholic (Franciscan) Sisters of St. Francis of Dubuque
- President: Matthew Draud
- Location: Sioux City, Iowa, U.S.
- Campus: 70 acres; Urban
- Colors: Blue & Gold
- Nickname: Chargers
- Sporting affiliations: NAIA – GPAC
- Website: briarcliff.edu

Briar Cliff University is a private Franciscan university in Sioux City, Iowa.

== History ==
In March 1929, Mother Mary Dominica Wieneke, Major Superior of the Sisters of Saint Francis of the Holy Family of Dubuque, Iowa, along with Edmond Heelan, Bishop of the Sioux City Diocese, co-founded Briar Cliff College after meeting with members of the Sioux City community, who committed to raising $25,000 to support the establishment of a Catholic women's college in Sioux City. The twelve foundresses of the college were carefully chosen by Mother Dominica. They were led by Sister Mary Servatius Greenen, who was named the first president.

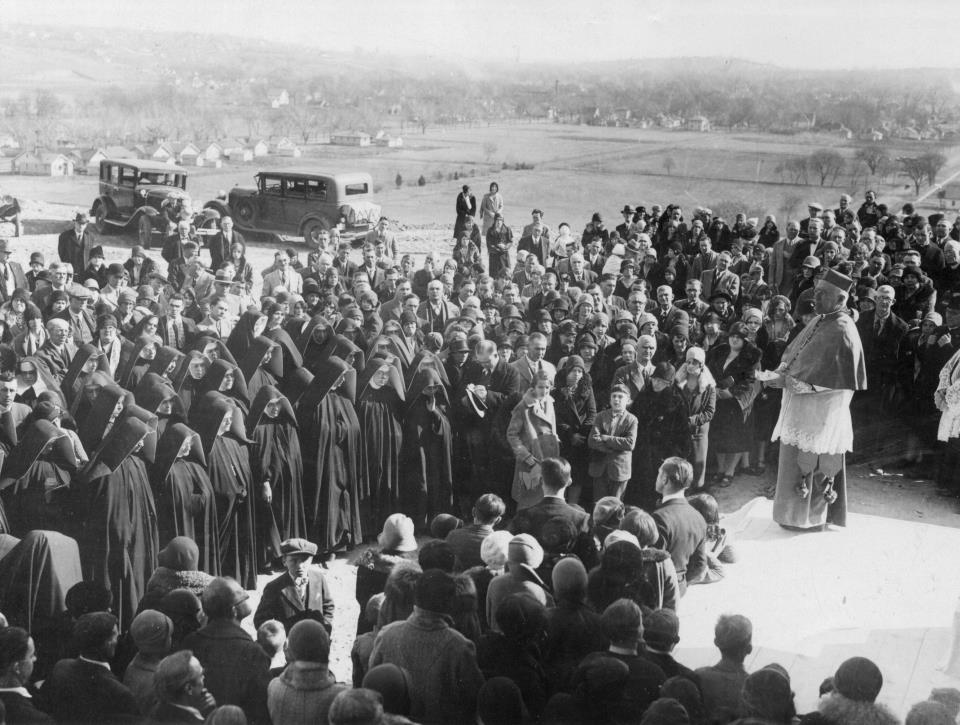
Briar Cliff University dedication, 1930

On September 18, 1930, the college, named after the hill on which it is located, was dedicated. Four days later, 25 women started classes in Heelan Hall, the only building on campus at the time. In 1937, the university's two-year program was extended to four years. Fifty-five men were admitted to Briar Cliff in 1965 and co-education was formalized in 1966 with the admission of 150 full-time male students. In 1967, the campus added the residence hall Toller to the facilities available to students, and continued in 1968 with the addition of Noonan Hall. In 1982, the athletic programs also received a new venue as the Newman Flanagan Center was built to house athletic competitions, coaches' offices, and recreational classes.

In 1986, the college's president, Charles Bensman, became the tenth president of Thomas More College in Kentucky.

New Master's programs were implemented in the summer of 2001. The college officially became a university on June 1, 2001. Online courses were first offered to students in 2006. The Center for Siouxland Research, the Center for Health Care Initiatives and the Center for Excellence in Learning and Teaching are currently active. The first doctoral degree, the Doctorate of Nurse Practitioner, was introduced in 2013.

== Campus ==
Briar Cliff University is situated on a scenic hilltop on the outskirts of Sioux City. Sioux City is located on the Missouri River; directly across the river are the states of South Dakota and Nebraska. The 75-acre campus includes four residence halls, as well as other buildings used for academic, athletic, and student support purposes.

== Organization and administration ==
Briar Cliff University is accredited as a degree-granting institution by Higher Learning Commission. It is a member of the North Central Association of Colleges and Secondary Schools. The education program of the university is approved by the State Department of Education of Iowa. The social work program is accredited by the Council on Social Work Education. The Bachelor of Science in Nursing (BSN), the Master of Science in Nursing (MSN), the Post-Graduate APRN Certificate, and the Doctor of Nursing Practice (DNP) programs at Briar Cliff University are accredited by the Commission on Collegiate Nursing Education (CCNE). All BCU nursing programs are approved by the Iowa Board of Nursing and meet the state educational requirements for licensure in the state of Iowa.

== Academics ==
Briar Cliff offers four-year academic programs and pre-professional programs in over 30 fields of study, culminating in a Bachelor's degree. Graduate degrees offered include a Master of Science, Master of Arts, Master of Health Administration, Doctor of Nursing Practice, and Doctor of Physical Therapy. Most students major in business, education, and health care.

== Athletics ==
The Briar Cliff athletic teams are called the Chargers. The university is a member of the National Association of Intercollegiate Athletics (NAIA), primarily competing in the Great Plains Athletic Conference (GPAC) since the 2002–03 academic year.

Briar Cliff competes in 16 intercollegiate varsity sports: Men's sports include baseball, basketball, cross country, football, golf, soccer, track & field and wrestling, while women's sports include basketball, cross country, golf, soccer, softball, track & field and volleyball.

Since 1966, Briar Cliff University athletics have been represented in 10 national championships, 12 GPAC championships, and 61 NAIA tournament appearances. Additionally, the Chargers have produced 210 All-Americans.

In 2021, the Chargers received a perfect Champions of Character score from the NAIA, one of only 16 schools nationwide to do so.

=== Basketball ===
The Chargers most recently appeared at the nationals in the 2012–2013 season, reaching the Final Four the season before. The Men's basketball program won the GPAC regular season and tournament title in 2015–2016. They have been to the NAIA National Tournament twenty-one times, the last being in the 2018–2019 season, where they made it to the Elite 8.

==== Panama Pipeline ====
During the late 1970s and continuing into the 1980s, the Briar Cliff men's basketball head coach Ray Nacke recruited players from Panama. These players, labeled the 'Panama Pipeline' by a 1981 Sports Illustrated article, included several players who played for the Panama men's national basketball team, such as Eddie Warren, Mario Butler, and, a fan favorite, Rolando Frazer. The Pipeline helped Nacke's squad to a number of NAIA Regional Championships, a number of berths in the NAIA National Tournament, and, in 1981, earned a first-place national ranking for the first time in Charger history.

=== Track and field ===
In 2000, Sharline Maxwell became the first Charger to win an individual national championship in any sport. She did so by winning the NAIA Indoor Championship in the 400 meter dash. Maxwell would go on to win two more championships in her time at Briar Cliff. In 2013, The Briar Cliff men's track team took four individuals to the NAIA Indoor Championships, and returned with four individual All-Americans. This group was highlighted by Augustus Cowan who won a national title in the triple jump.

=== Football ===
In 2001, Briar Cliff began its football program, while 2003 marked the first official varsity season for the program. In their first year, the Chargers garnered a 0–10 record. The following year, the team recorded its first win, one of three on the season. To date, the Chargers have compiled a record of 53-174. The Briar Cliff football team played their home games at Memorial Field until 2013 when they began playing home games at the Dakota Dome, on the campus of the University of South Dakota, about 39 miles northwest. In 2017 the Chargers returned to Sioux City and to Memorial Field thanks to a partnership with Bishop Heelan Catholic High School.

=== Baseball and softball ===
Briar Cliff offers both baseball and softball as spring sports. Each one of these teams competes in the Great Plains Athletic Conference. The baseball team plays their home games at Bishop Mueller Field, a baseball complex shared with Bishop Heelan High School. After previously playing their home games at the SYA Riverside Complex, the BCU softball team moved back to the university's campus in 2013, where they too share the field with Bishop Heelan High School.

In 2005, Briar Cliff University Baseball upset Bellevue University, ending Bellevue's 10-year run of winning the Region 4 title, to make it to the Super Regional Round against Dakota State. Briar Cliff swept the two games of the super regionals winning an extra-inning affair (7-6) and closing out Dakota State with a blowout win (13-1) to advance to the 2005 Avista NAIA College World Series. Briar Cliff would lose to Spalding University (9-3) and to Biola University (4-1). This was their first and only appearance in the NAIA College World Series. More recently, in 2015 the BCU baseball team won the GPAC conference with a conference record of (14-6), snapping the team's streak of 6 straight losing seasons.

== See also ==
- Briar Cliff Review
