= Point Lookout, Missouri =

- Unincorporated community
- Location within Missouri
- Coordinates: 36°37′03″N 93°14′22″W
- Country: United States
- State: Missouri
- County: Taney
- Elevation: 932 ft (284 m)
- Time zone: UTC-6 (Central (CST))
  - Summer (DST): UTC-5 (CDT)
- ZIP code: 65726
- Area code: 417
- GNIS feature ID: 736272

Point Lookout is an unincorporated community in Oliver Township, Taney County, Missouri, United States, near Branson and Hollister. Point Lookout is in the U.S. postal service ZIP code 65726. Point Lookout is part of the Branson Micropolitan Statistical Area.

== History ==
The Point Lookout post office has been in operation since 1931. The community was so named because of its lofty elevation. Its elevation is approximately 928.96 feet or 283.15 meters above mean sea level.

== Education ==
College of the Ozarks completely encompasses the community. The College of the Ozarks owns and maintains the entire 1,000 acres of Point Lookout. College of the Ozarks previously hosted the NAIA Division II basketball tournament annually.
