= 2006 in basketball =

The following are the basketball events of the year 2006 throughout the world.

Tournaments include international (FIBA), professional (club) and amateur and collegiate levels.

== Championships ==
=== International ===
- 2006 FIBA World Championship:
  - Gold medal: Spain
  - Silver medal: Greece
  - Bronze medal: (United States) USA
  - MVP: Pau Gasol, Spain
  - All-tournament team:
    - (Spain) Pau Gasol
    - (United States) Carmelo Anthony (USA)
    - Jorge Garbajosa (Spain)
    - Manu Ginóbili (Argentina)
    - Theodoros Papaloukas (Greece)
- 2006 FIBA World Championship for Women

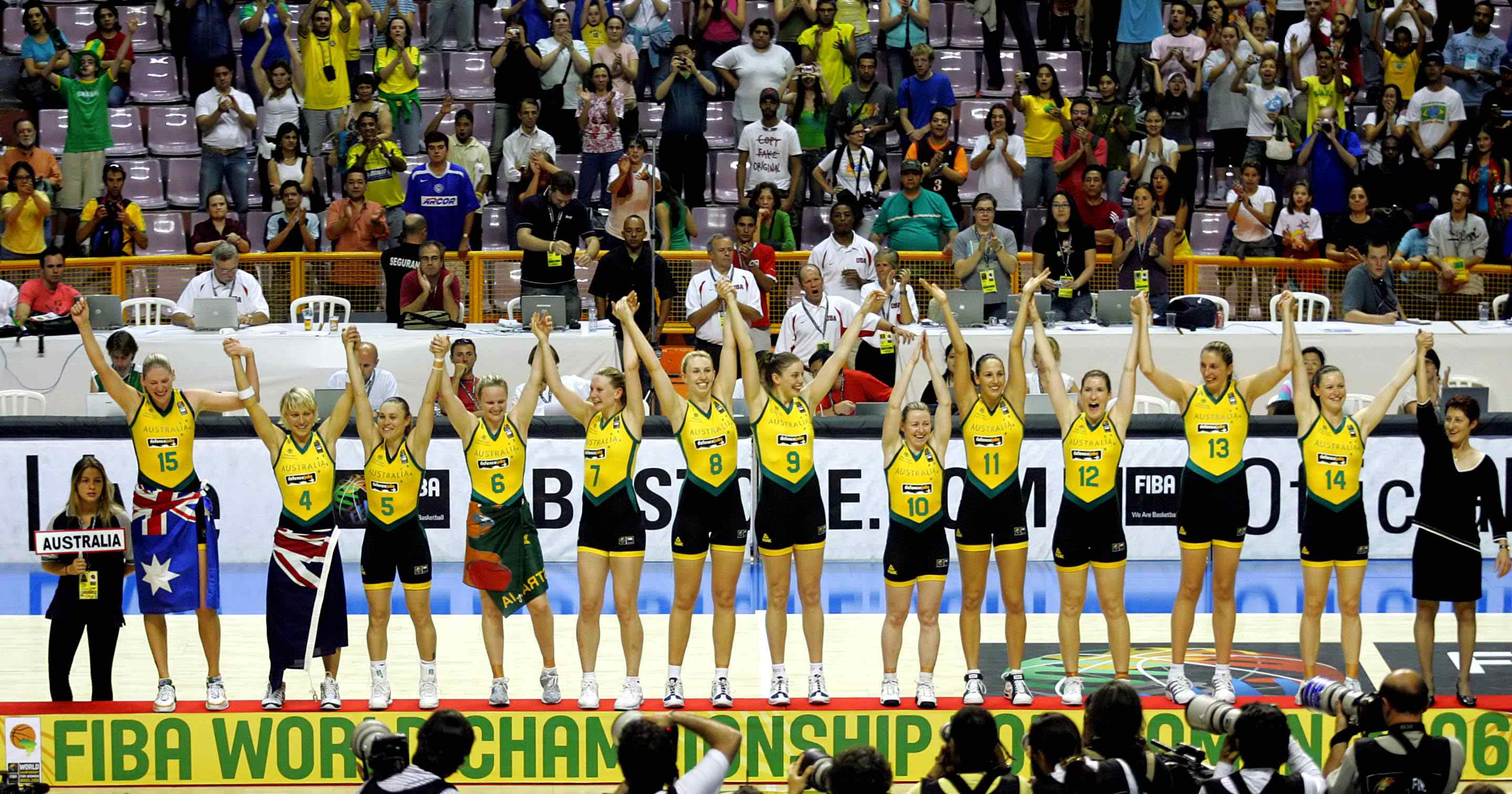
Australia women's national basketball team, celebrating after being awarded the gold medals for winning the 2006 FIBA World Championship for Women in basketball

  - Gold medal: Australia
  - Silver medal: Russia
  - Bronze medal: (United States) USA
  - MVP: Penny Taylor, Australia
- Basketball at the 2006 Asian Games
  - Men's tournament:
    - Gold medal: China
    - Silver medal: Qatar
    - Bronze medal: Iran
  - Women's tournament:
    - Gold medal: China
    - Silver medal: Chinese Taipei
    - Bronze medal: Japan

=== Professional ===
==== Men ====
- (United States) (Canada) NBA season and playoffs:
  - 2006 NBA Finals: Miami Heat 4, Dallas Mavericks 2. MVP: Dwyane Wade
    - 2006 NBA draft
    - 2006 NBA All-Star Game
- EuroLeague (Europe-wide):
  - CSKA Moscow defeated Maccabi Tel Aviv 73–69 in the final
- (Croatia) Croatian League:
  - Cibona defeated Zadar 2–1 in the best-of-three finals
- (France) French League:
  - Le Mans defeated Nancy 93–88 in the one-off final
- (Germany) German Bundesliga:
  - RheinEnergie Köln defeated Alba Berlin 3–1 in the best-of-five finals
- (Greece) Greek League:
  - Panathinaikos defeated Olympiakos 3–0 in the best-of-five finals
- (Iran) Iranian Super League, 2005–06 season:
  - Saba Battery defeat Petrochimi 3–0 in the best-of-five final.
- Israel Premier League:
  - Maccabi Tel Aviv defeated Hapoel Jerusalem 96–66 in the one-off final (the first such final in Israel history)
- (Italy) Italian Serie A:
  - Benetton Treviso defeated Climamio Bologna 3–1 in the best-of-five finals
- (Lithuania) Lithuanian LKL:
  - Lietuvos Rytas defeated Žalgiris 4–0 in the best-of-seven finals
- (Philippines) Philippine Basketball Association 2005–06 season:
  - Red Bull Barako over the Purefoods Chunkee Giants 4–2 in the Fiesta Conference Finals. Finals MVP: Lordy Tugade
  - Purefoods Chunkee Giants over Red Bull Barako 4–2 in the Philippine Cup Finals. Finals MVP: Marc Pingris
- (Poland) Polish League:
  - Prokom Trefl Sopot over Anwil Włocławek 4–1 in the best-of-seven finals
- (Russia) Russian Super League:
  - CSKA Moscow over Khimki 3–0 in the best-of-five finals
- Serbia and Montenegro Super League:
  - Partizan over Red Star 3–0 in the best-of-five finals
- (Spain) Spanish ACB:
  - Unicaja Málaga over TAU Cerámica 3–0 in the best-of-five finals
    - 2005–06 season, 2005–06 playoffs
- (Turkey) Turkish Basketball League:
  - Ülkerspor over Efes Pilsen 4–0 in the best-of-seven finals. Only three matches were actually played; under Turkish rules, Ülker was granted a 1–0 lead by virtue of its regular-season sweep of Efes.
- (United Kingdom) British Basketball League:
  - Newcastle Eagles defeated Scottish Rocks 83–68 in the one-off final
- (Bosnia and Herzegovina) (Croatia) (Slovenia) (Serbia) (Montenegro) (North Macedonia) Adriatic League:
  - FMP defeated Partizan 73–72 in the one-off final

==== Women ====
- (United States) 2006 WNBA Finals: Detroit Shock 3, Sacramento Monarchs 2
    - 2006 WNBA season
    - 2006 WNBA Playoffs
    - 2006 WNBA draft
    - 2006 WNBA All-Star Game
  - MVP: Deanna Nolan, Detroit

=== College ===
- Men
  - (United States) NCAA
    - Division I: Florida 73, UCLA 57
    - National Invitation Tournament: South Carolina 76, Michigan 64
    - Division II: Winona State 73, Virginia Union 61
    - Division III: Virginia Wesleyan 59, Wittenberg 56
  - (United States) NAIA
    - NAIA Division I: Texas Wesleyan 67, Oklahoma City 65
    - NAIA Division II: College of the Ozarks (Mo.) 74, Huntington (Ind.) 56
  - (United States) NJCAA
    - Division I: Arkansas-Ft. Smith 68, Tallahassee CC (FL) 59
    - Division II: Cecil CC 9 (MD) 64, Kirkwood CC (IA) 63
    - Division III: North Lake College (TX) 78, Gloucester County College (N.J.) 65
  - (Philippines) UAAP Men's: University of Santo Tomas over Ateneo de Manila University, 2 games to 1
  - NCAA (Philippines) Seniors': San Beda College over Philippine Christian University, 2 games to 1

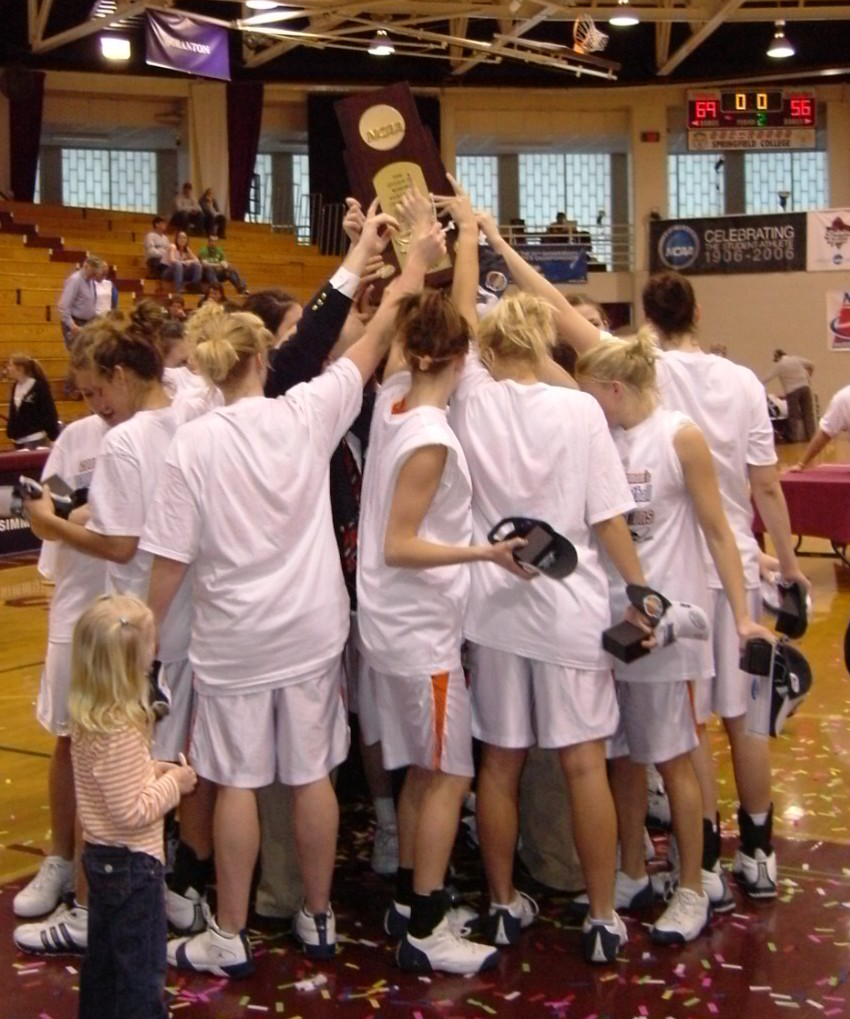
Hope College women's team raises 2006 NCAA Division III championship trophy.

- Women
  - (United States) NCAA
    - Division I: Maryland 78, Duke 75 OT
    - WNIT: Kansas State 77, Marquette 65
    - Division II: Grand Valley State 58, American International 52
    - Division III Hope 69, Southern Maine 56
  - (United States) NAIA
    - NAIA Division I: Union (TN) 79, Lubbock Christian (TX) 62
    - NAIA Division II Hastings (Neb.) 58, College of the Ozarks (Mo.) 39
  - (United States) NJCAA
    - Division I: Monroe CC (Rochester, New York) 76, Odessa College (TX) 64
    - Division II: Illinois Central College 71, Kirkwood CC (IA) 54
    - Division III: Monroe College (Bronx, New York) 100, Mohawk Valley CC (NY) 70
  - (Philippines) UAAP Women's: University of Santo Tomas over Far Eastern University, 2 games to 1

=== Prep ===
- (United States) USA Today Boys Basketball Ranking #1: Lawrence North High School, Indianapolis, Indiana
- (United States) USA Today Girls Basketball Ranking #1: Christ the King, Queens, New York
- NCAA (Philippines) Juniors: San Sebastian Recoletos High School over Philippine Christian University Union High School, 2 games to 0
- (Philippines) UAAP Juniors: Ateneo de Manila High School over Far Eastern University-Nicanor Reyes Educational Foundation, 2 games to 1

== Awards and honors ==
=== Naismith Memorial Basketball Hall of Fame ===
- Class of 2006:
  - Geno Auriemma
  - Charles Barkley
  - Joe Dumars
  - Alessandro "Sandro" Gamba
  - Dave Gavitt
  - Jacques Dominique Wilkins

=== Women's Basketball Hall of Fame ===
- Class of 2006
  - Geno Auriemma
  - Maria Paula Gonçalves da Silva
  - Clarissa Davis-Wrightsil
  - Janice Lawrence Braxton
  - Katrina McClain Johnson
  - Barbara Stevens

=== Professional ===
- Men
  - NBA Most Valuable Player Award: Steve Nash
  - NBA Rookie of the Year Award: Chris Paul
  - NBA Defensive Player of the Year Award: Ben Wallace
  - NBA Coach of the Year Award: Avery Johnson
  - FIBA Europe Player of the Year Award: Theodoros Papaloukas, CSKA Moscow and Greece
  - Euroscar Award: Dirk Nowitzki, Dallas Mavericks and Germany
  - Mr. Europa: Jorge Garbajosa, Toronto Raptors and Spain (also Unicaja Málaga)
- Women
  - WNBA Most Valuable Player Award: Lisa Leslie, Los Angeles Sparks
  - WNBA Defensive Player of the Year Award: Tamika Catchings, Indiana Fever
  - WNBA Rookie of the Year Award: Seimone Augustus, Minnesota Lynx
  - WNBA Most Improved Player Award: Erin Buescher, Sacramento Monarchs
  - Kim Perrot Sportsmanship Award: Dawn Staley, Houston Comets
  - WNBA Coach of the Year Award: Mike Thibault, Connecticut Sun
  - WNBA Finals Most Valuable Player Award: Deanna Nolan, Detroit Shock
  - FIBA Europe Player of the Year Award: Maria Stepanova, CSKA Samara and Russia

=== Collegiate ===
- Combined
  - Legends of Coaching Award: Jim Boeheim, Syracuse
- Men
  - John R. Wooden Award: J. J. Redick, Duke
  - Naismith College Coach of the Year: Jay Wright, Villanova
  - Frances Pomeroy Naismith Award: Dee Brown, Illinois
  - Associated Press College Basketball Player of the Year: J. J. Redick, Duke
  - NCAA basketball tournament Most Outstanding Player: Corey Brewer, Florida
  - USBWA National Freshman of the Year: Tyler Hansbrough, North Carolina
  - Associated Press College Basketball Coach of the Year: Roy Williams (coach), North Carolina
  - Naismith Outstanding Contribution to Basketball: Jerry Colangelo
- Women
  - John R. Wooden Award: Seimone Augustus, LSU
  - Naismith College Player of the Year: Seimone Augustus, LSU
  - Naismith College Coach of the Year: Sylvia Hatchell, North Carolina
  - Wade Trophy: Seimone Augustus, LSU
  - Frances Pomeroy Naismith Award: Megan Duffy, Notre Dame
  - Associated Press Women's College Basketball Player of the Year: Seimone Augustus, LSU
  - NCAA basketball tournament Most Outstanding Player: Laura Harper, Maryland
  - Basketball Academic All-America Team: Lindsay Shearer, Kent State
  - Carol Eckman Award: Gail Goestenkors, Duke
  - USBWA National Freshman of the Year: Courtney Paris, Oklahoma
  - Associated Press College Basketball Coach of the Year: Sylvia Hatchell, North Carolina
  - List of Senior CLASS Award women's basketball winners: Seimone Augustus, LSU
  - Nancy Lieberman Award: Ivory Latta, North Carolina
  - Naismith Outstanding Contribution to Basketball: Val Ackerman

== Events ==
- December 13- after a few months in use and complaints from players, the NBA announces it will disuse the new synthetic ball in favor of the classic leather one.
- December 16- a brawl erupted at the Madison Square Garden game between the New York Knicks and the Denver Nuggets.

== Movies ==
- Church Ball
- Crossover (film)
- The Heart of the Game
- Glory Road (film)
- Like Mike 2: Streetball

== Deaths ==
- February 11 — Harry Vines, American wheelchair basketball coach (born 1938)
- March 17 — Ray Meyer, American Hall of Fame coach of the DePaul University men's team (born 1913)
- April 6 — Maggie Dixon, women's coach at Army (born 1977)
- April 6 — Price Brookfield, American NBA player (born 1920)
- April 19 — Gene Rosenthal, American NBL player (Pittsburgh Pirates) (born 1914)
- May 6 — Bob Dro, national champion at Indiana and Indianapolis Kautskys player (born 1918)
- May 9 — Grady Wallace, All-American and national scoring champion at South Carolina
- May 18 — Irving Meretsky, Canadian Olympic silver medalist (1936) (born 1912)
- July 3 — Dick Dickey, NBA player and All-American at NC State (born 1926)
- July 4 — Bobby Joe Mason, Harlem Globetrotters player and college All-American at Bradley (born 1936)
- July 21 — Alexander Petrenko, Russian player (BC Khimki) (born 1976)
- August 18 — Dick Hickox, American college All-American (Miami Hurricanes) (born 1938)
- September 7 — Ozell Jones, American NBA player (San Antonio Spurs, Los Angeles Clippers) (born 1960)
- October 5 — Cleveland Buckner, American NBA player (New York Knicks) (born 1938)
- October 5 — George King, American NBA player (Syracuse Nationals, Cincinnati Royals) and college coach (West Virginia, Purdue) (born 1928)
- October 25 — Johnny Hoekstra, American NBL player (Kankakee Gallagher Trojans) (born 1917)
- October 28 — Arnold "Red" Auerbach, Hall of Fame coach and president of the Boston Celtics (born 1917)
- November 9 — Mikhail Semyonov, Russian (Soviet) Olympic Silver medalist (1956, 1960) (born 1933)
- November 29 — Gary Alcorn, American NBA player (Detroit Pistons, Los Angeles Lakers) (born 1936)
- December 12 — Paul Arizin, Hall of Famer for the Philadelphia Warriors who twice led the NBA in scoring (born 1928)
- December 13 — Lamar Hunt, original ownership partner of the Chicago Bulls (born 1932)
- December 21 — Warren Hair, American NBL player (Kankakee Gallagher Trojans) (born 1918)
- December 29 — Charlie Tyra, All-American college (Louisville) and NBA player (New York Knicks, Chicago Packers) (born 1935)

== See also ==
- Timeline of women's basketball
