= Oregon Institute of Technology, Klamath Falls =

- Former names: Oregon Vocational School (1947–1948); Oregon Technical Institute (1948–1973)
- Type: Public university
- Established: 1947
- Endowment: $42.5 million (2014)
- President: Nagi Naganathan
- Provost: Hesham El-Rewini
- Faculty: 139
- Administrative staff: 222
- Students: 8,205 (fall 2017)
- Undergraduates: 6,297 (fall 2017)
- Postgraduates: 55
- Location: Klamath Falls, Oregon, U.S. 42.2565°N 121.7855°W
- Campus: Rural, 190 acres (77 ha) Suburban, 0.5 acres (0.20 ha)
- Colors: Blue & Gold
- Nickname: Hustlin' Owls
- Sporting affiliations: NAIA – CCC
- Mascot: Hootie
- Website: www.oit.edu

The Oregon Institute of Technology, Klamath Falls or historically, Oregon Tech, is a campus in Klamath Falls, Oregon of the Oregon Institute of Technology, a public college in Oregon. At this campus, the institution provides 47 degree programs in engineering, health technologies, management, communication, psychology, and applied sciences.

== History ==
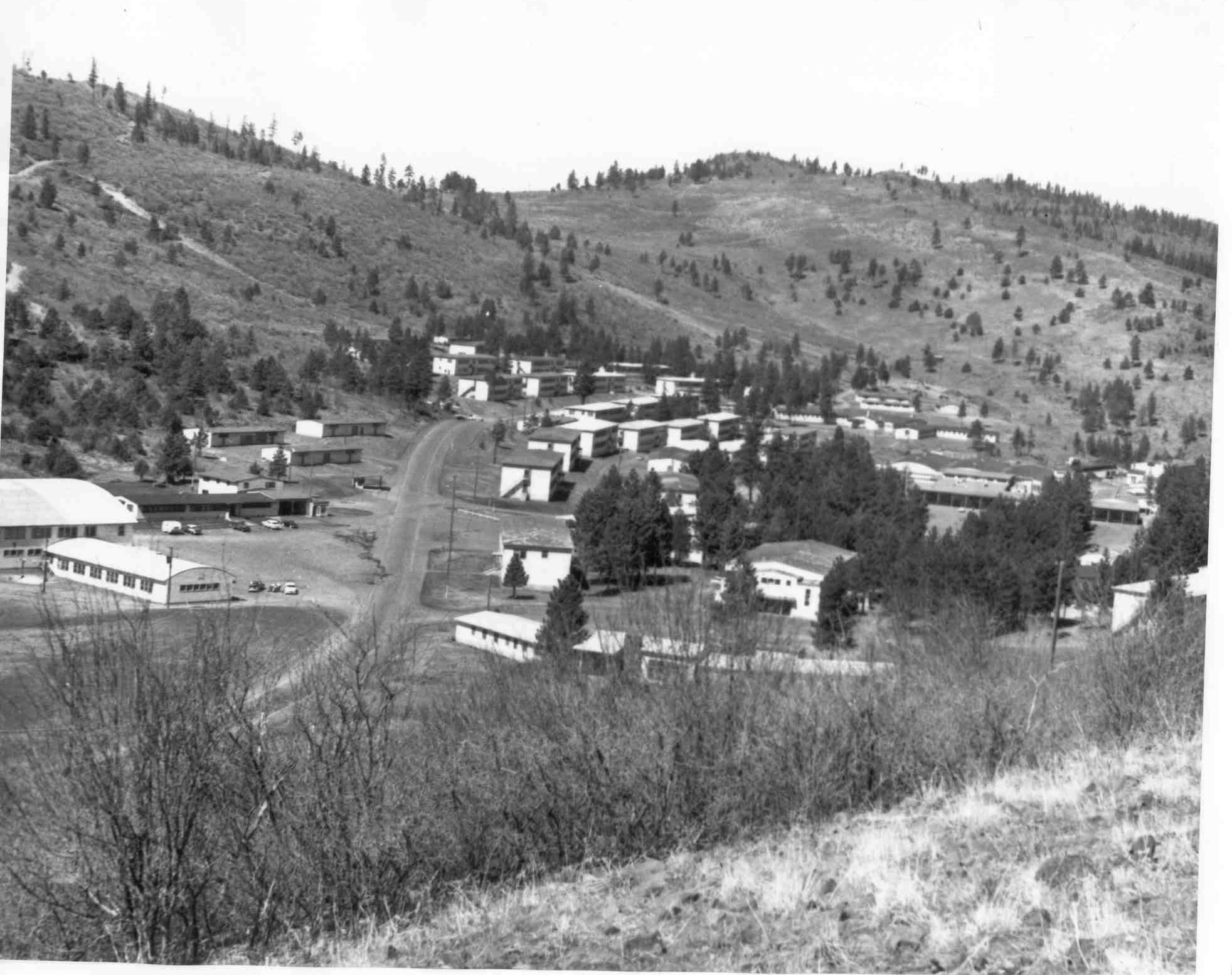
The original Oregon Institute of Technology campus on Old Fort Road.

Oregon Tech was founded as the Oregon Vocational School on July 15, 1947, to train and re-educate returning World War II veterans. Under the direction of Winston Purvine, the first classes were held in a deactivated Marine Corps hospital three miles northeast of Klamath Falls. The following year, the school's title was changed to the Oregon Technical Institute. In the first school year, 1947–1948, veterans constituted 98 percent of student enrollment. By 1950, the figure was 75 percent. In that year, in response to the Korean War, the school received a contract for training soldiers in welding and warehouse management. In 1953, Associate degree programs in Surveying and Structural Engineering Technologies were first accredited by the Engineers Council for Professional Development. The campus was transferred to its current location in 1964, followed by another name change to the Oregon Institute of Technology in 1973.

In 2021, Oregon Tech was officially designated as "Oregon's Polytechnic University" by the Oregon Legislature through the passage of House Bill 2472A.

== Academics ==
In 2023, Oregon Tech was approved to offer a doctor of physical therapy program in partnership with OHSU. This strategic partnership between Oregon Tech, OHSU, and Sky Lakes Medical Center to promote and accelerate rural health initiatives was Oregon Tech's first doctoral program.

In 2005, Oregon Tech introduced the first Bachelor of Science degree in Renewable Energy Engineering (REE) offered in North America. The new program uses electrical and mechanical engineering fundamentals in conjunction with upper-division coursework in renewable energy and energy systems. The Renewable Energy Engineering degree is offered in both Klamath Falls and Wilsonville with a master's degree program at the Wilsonville campus.

=== Rankings and recognition ===
In 2025, Oregon Tech was ranked #11 of 19 in the U.S. News rankings of Best Colleges in Oregon. According to Payscale's 2023 rankings, Oregon Tech was the #1 Return on Investment in Oregon and also #1 in Oregon according to ROI rankings by Georgetown University Center on Education and the Workforce in 2022.

== Campus ==
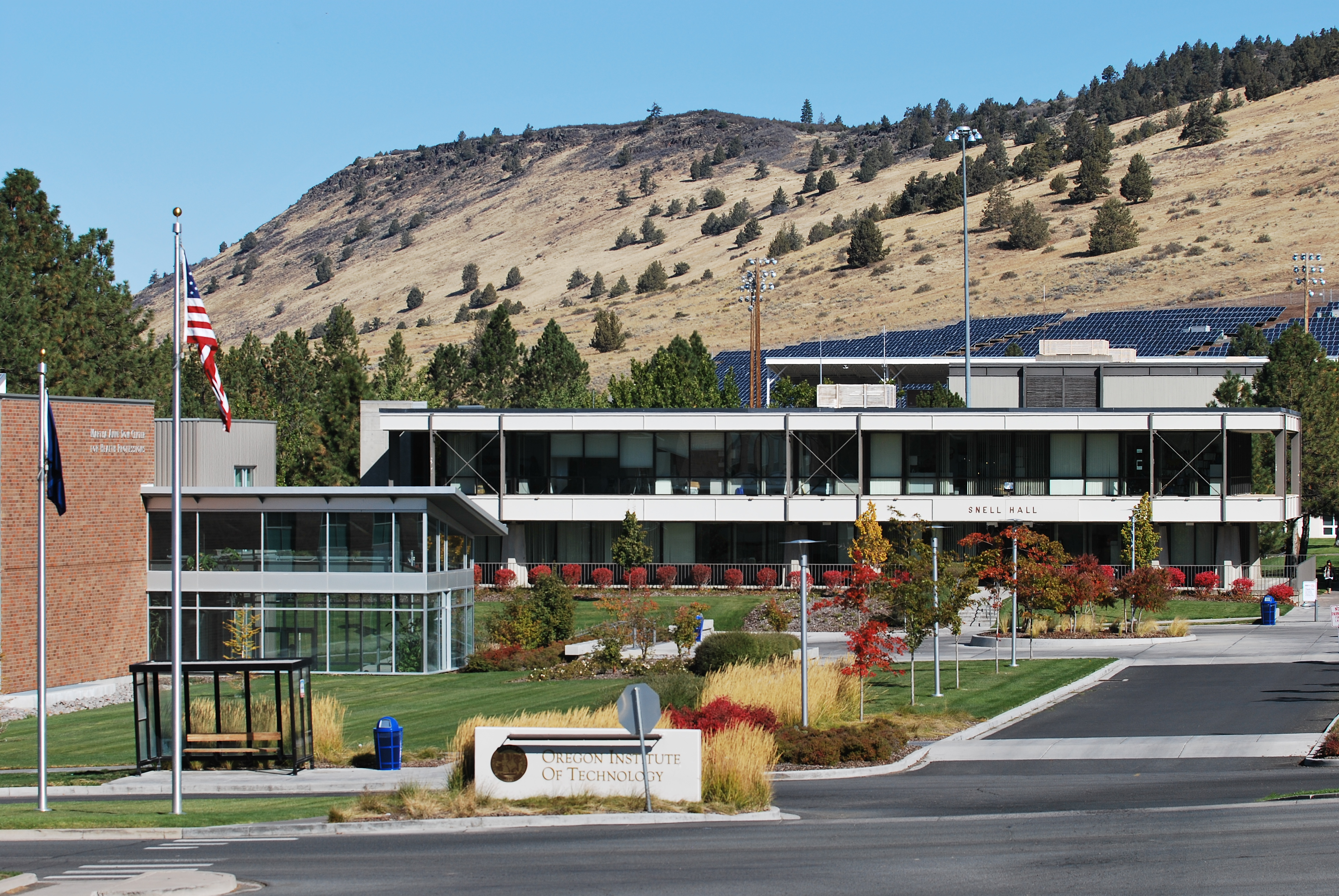
Klamath Falls campus in 2013.

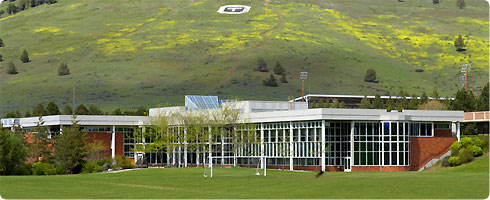
Purvine Hall

The present Klamath Falls Oregon Tech campus overlooks Upper Klamath Lake, and is directly adjacent to Sky Lakes Medical Center. The physical location of the school often elicits a favorable response with its views of the lake and mountains.

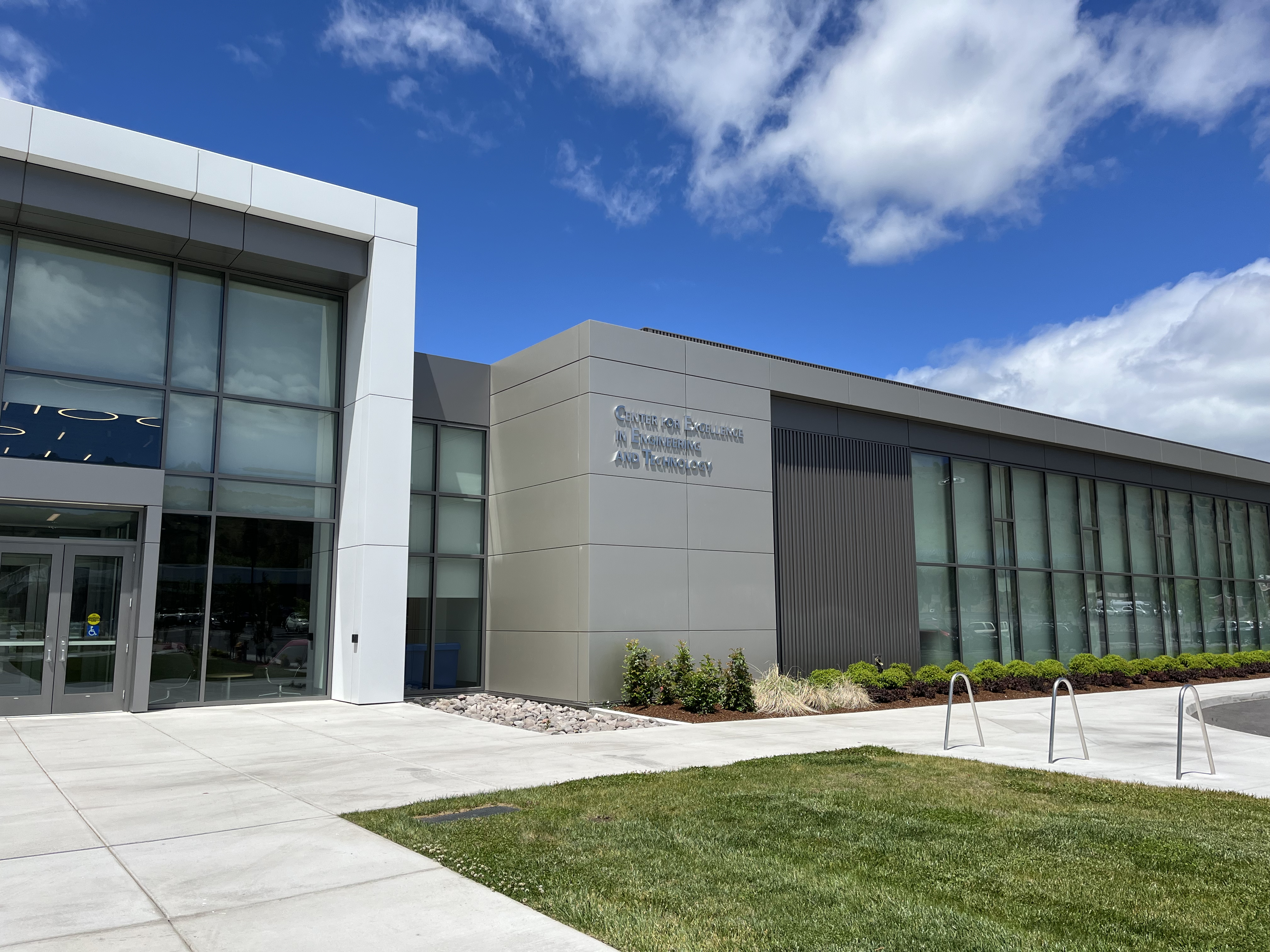
Upper floor exterior shot of CEET Hall at Oregon Tech

Newer buildings such as the Martha Anne Dow Center for Health Professions, CEET (Center for Excellence in Engineering and Technology), and the renovated Boivin Hall show a modern collegiate style.

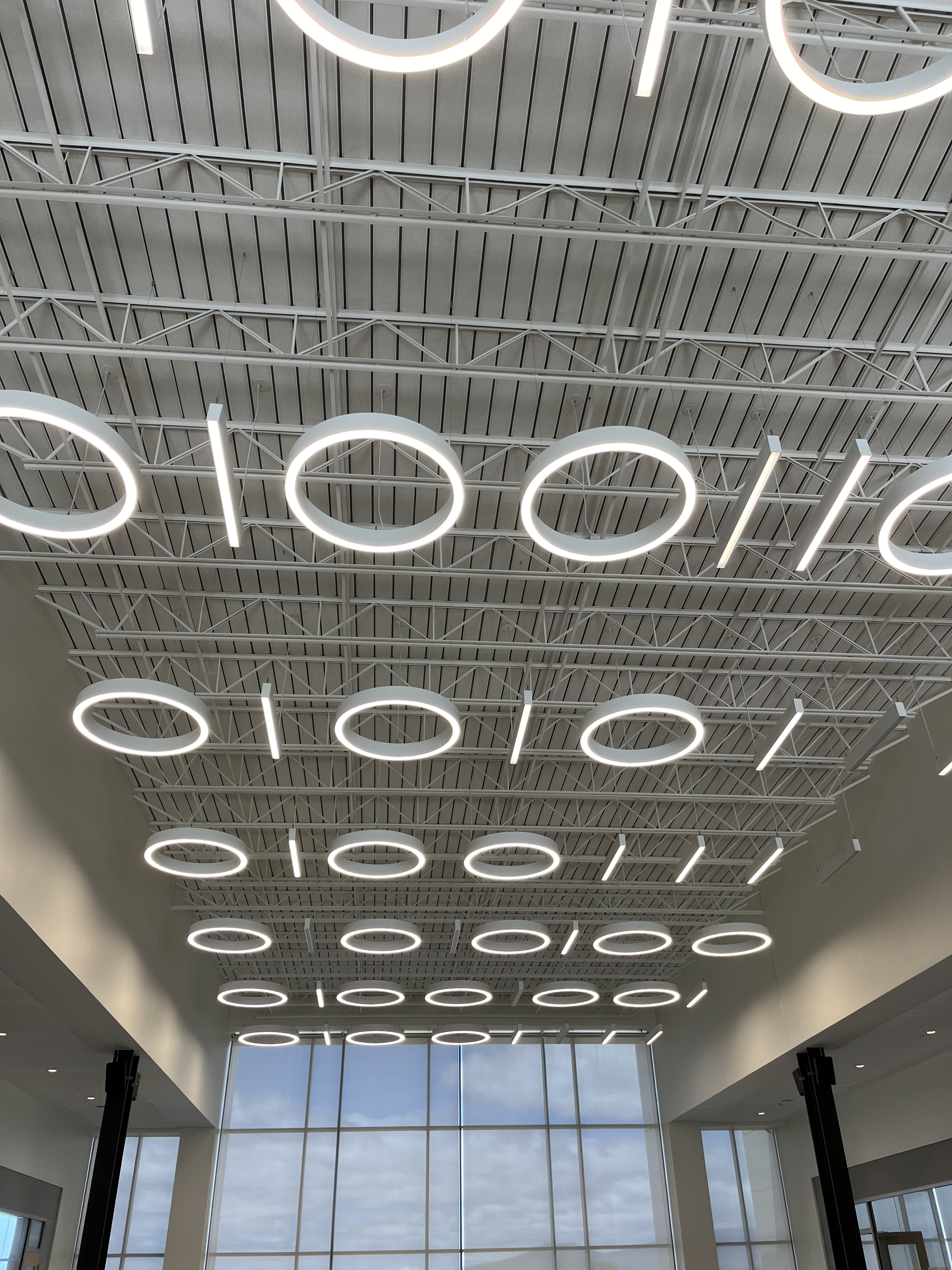
Binary ceiling of CEET Hall. In binary it spells SLWOTIO (OIT OWLS, backwards).

Oregon Tech has a residence hall adjacent to the College Union, often referred to as "The Castle" by students because of its concrete appearance and elevated placement. An additional residence hall is under construction and scheduled for completion in 2025 at the previous location of the university tennis courts.

The institution opened an apartment-style housing unit titled "The Sustainable Village," or just "The Village," adjacent to the original residence hall for the start of the fall term, in 2009.

Many students live off-campus in the residential area south of the college along North Eldorado Avenue, or elsewhere in Klamath Falls.

== Athletics ==
The Oregon Tech (OIT) athletic teams are called the Owls and Lady Owls (sometimes known as the "Hustlin' Owls"). The institute of technology is a member of the National Association of Intercollegiate Athletics (NAIA), primarily competing in the Cascade Collegiate Conference (CCC) since the 1993–94 academic year.

Oregon Tech competes in 13 intercollegiate varsity sports: Men's sports include baseball, basketball, cross country, golf, soccer and track & field; while women's sports include basketball, cross country, golf, soccer, softball, track & field and volleyball. The mascot for Oregon Tech Athletics is the Hootie the Hustlin' Owl.

=== Rivalries ===
Oregon Tech's traditional athletic nemesis is Southern Oregon University in Ashland, Oregon. The close proximity of the schools and alternate academic foci (science and technology at Oregon Tech, liberal arts at SOU) result in a natural rivalry between the two. In 2023 Oregon Tech softball faced Southern Oregon in the NAIA Softball National Championship.

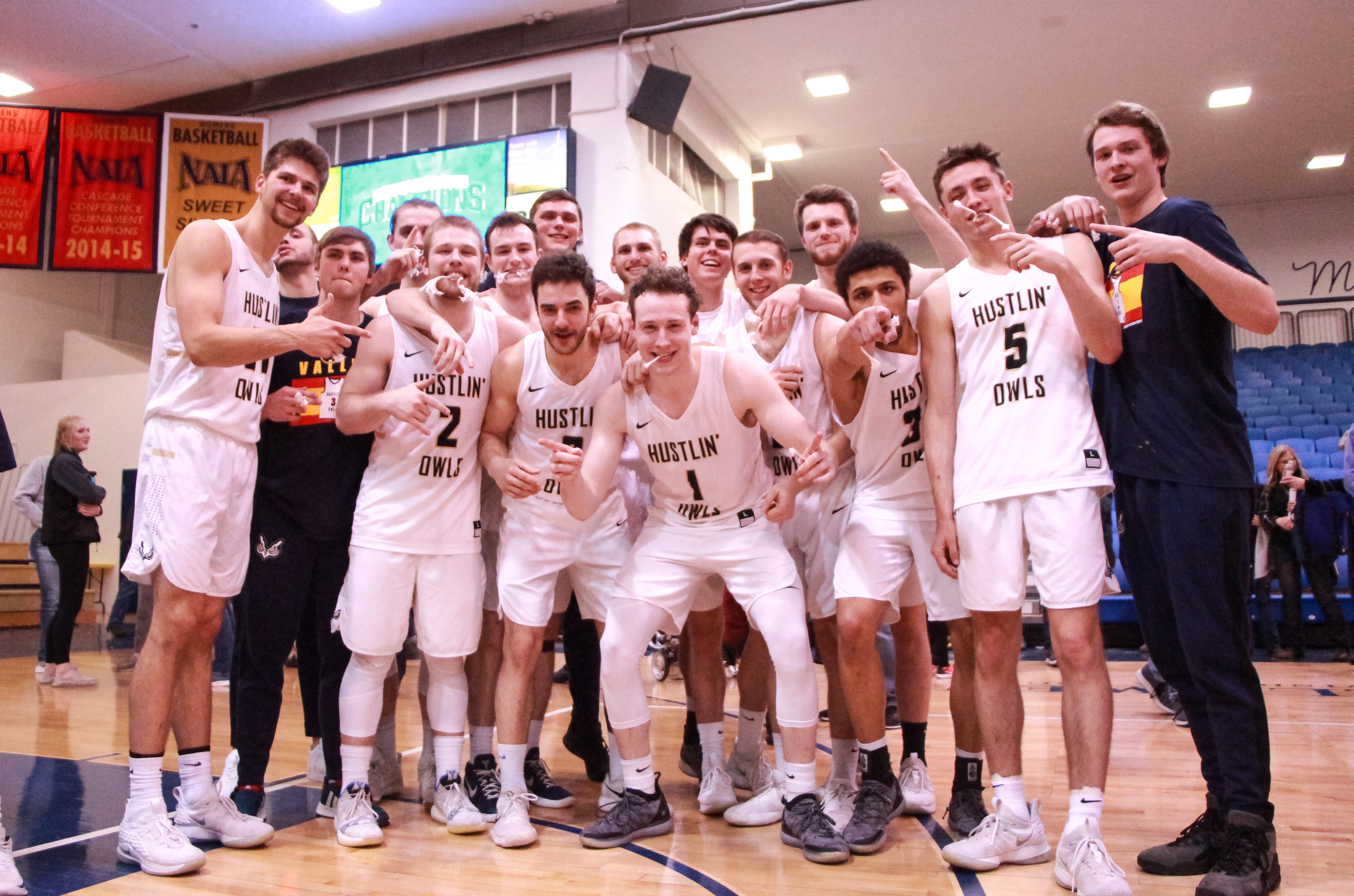

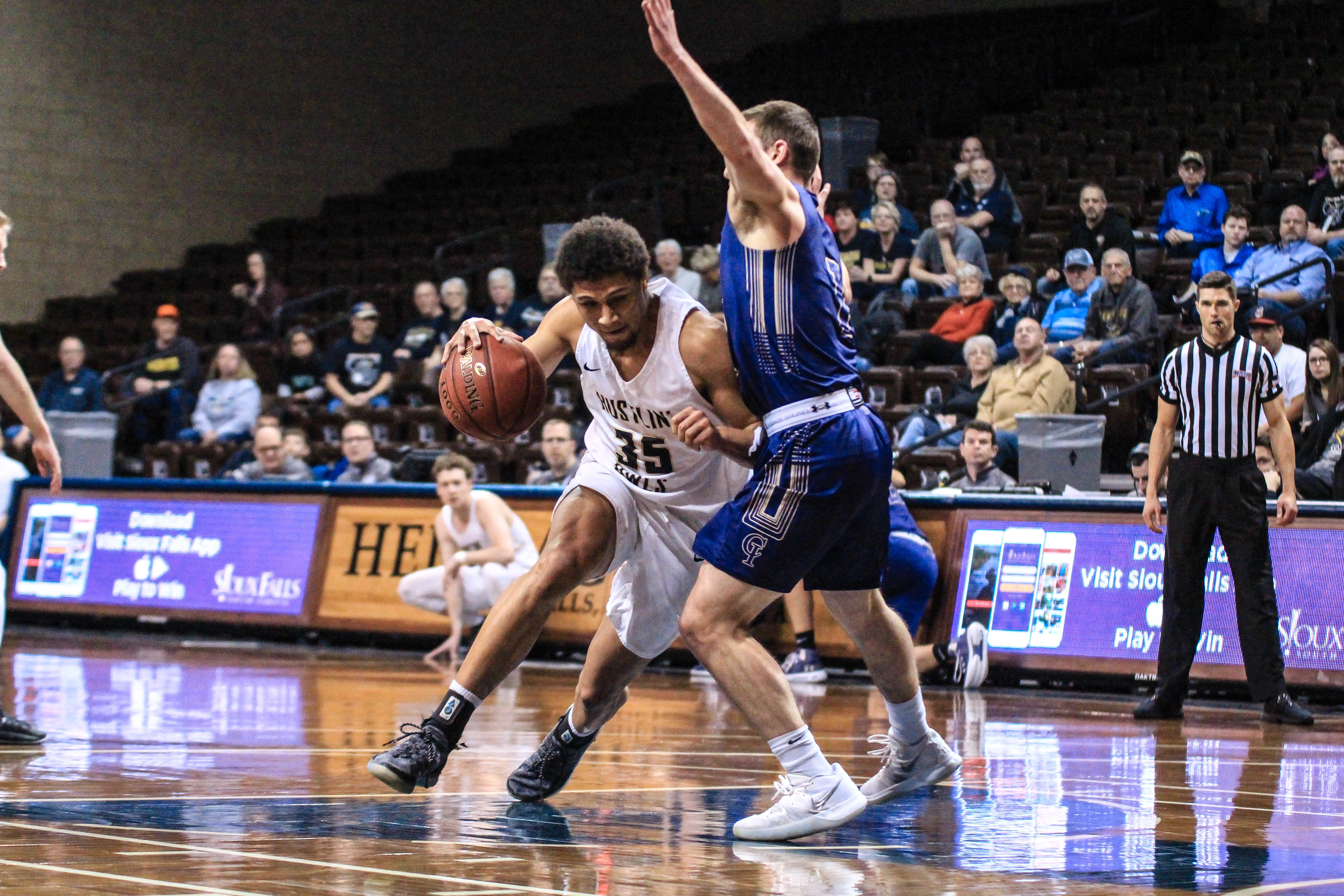

=== Basketball ===
Oregon Tech basketball has been consistently competitive in the CCC and at the national level, while earning a somewhat infamous reputation within the conference for its passionate crowds and rowdy student section. In March 2004, the Oregon Tech men's basketball team won the NAIA Division II National Championship. They won the NAIA National Championship again in 2008 and 2012. In 2019, the Hustlin' Owls made another run in the NAIA National Tournament finishing as the runner-up to Spring Arbor in the championship game. The Owl's 2019 Tournament run included upsetting the #1 ranked team, and defending National Champion, Indiana Wesleyan 107–93 in the quarterfinals. In the Semifinal round, the Owls defeated conference foe College of Idaho 93–81 to advance to the title game.

==== National championships ====
The Oregon Tech men's basketball team won their first NAIA Division II National Championship against Bellevue University of Bellevue, Nebraska 81–72, on March 18, 2004. They won their second national title in a rematch exactly four years later, to the day, against the Bruins from Bellevue, 63–56 in 2008. In 2012 they won their third national title 63–46 against Northwood (Fla.).

==== Danny Miles ====
Men's basketball head coach Danny Miles retired after his 46th season at Oregon Tech and had accumulated a 1040–437 record (0.704). At that time, this record made him the third winningest coach in men's collegiate basketball history at a four-year institution (behind Mike Krzyzewski of Duke University with 1071 wins and Harry Statham of McKendree University with 1110 wins).

In Miles' tenure at Oregon Tech, he achieved three nationals championships, one national runner-up, one national third place, two "Elite Eight" finishes, seventeen district or conference titles, seven district runners-up, and ten 30-win seasons. His team ranked in the NAIA Division 1 or 2 top-20 on 30 occasions and averaged more than 23 wins per season.

=== Softball ===
In 2011 Oregon Tech won their first ever NAIA Softball National Championship.

=== Football ===
Oregon Tech first fielded a football team in 1948. The school dropped the football team in 1992 due to budget cuts.

=== Mascot ===
Oregon Tech's mascot, Hootie the Hustlin' Owl, is a great horned owl and has been portrayed as a costumed character since 1980. He sports the jersey number 47 as an homage to the school's founding year.

Known originally as "OIT OWL", Hootie was hatched out of a giant papier-mâché egg during a home football game. His other alias was "OWLY OOP" in the 1990s, amidst the loss of the school's football team, in an attempt to further emphasize their basketball program. The beloved owl mascot was created by executive secretary Nancy Cox, inspired by the San Diego Chicken after attending a Padres game in 1980 and proceeding previous attempts at an official school mascot such as a rally head in the 1960s named "OTIS" and a live owl.

Notable stunts include skydiving, ziplining, basketball trick shots, and various feats of acrobatics and professional dancing abilities. Performed by actress Brooke Eldridge (2021–2025), as featured on ABC Nightline News.

Accolades: • CCC Mascot of the Year 2014, 2018 • Mascot Training Camp Champion 2023 • Mascot Hall of Fame Awards Nominee 2023 (best video skit, most community impact)

== Clubs and activities ==
The institution has many different clubs and activities on campus which operate under the umbrella of the school's student government organization, Associated Students of OIT. Among these are student chapters of professional societies, such as the American Society of Civil Engineers and American Dental Hygienists' Association, Alpha Sigma Alpha sorority, Phi Delta Theta fraternity, recreational activity programs, special interest groups, cultural awareness organizations, student media, and academic honor societies. Also, Oregon Tech's student chapter of the Society of Automotive Engineers competes in the annual SAE Mini Baja event. The Renewable Energy Engineering program also has a club open to all majors and is working toward becoming a chapter of the Association of Energy Engineers. The Oregon Tech Robotics Club invites students from many majors to collaborate on multidisciplinary robotics projects such as the MATE ROV competition and to support community members in technical projects.

== Notable people ==
- Benny Agbayani, professional baseball player
- Joe Cain, professional football player
- Tim Freeman, Oregon House of Representatives
- Ty Knott, professional football coach
- Wayne Krieger, Oregon House of Representatives and Oregon State Police
- Nate Lewis, professional football player
- Doug Mikolas, professional football player
- Justin Parnell, college basketball coach
- Don Summers, professional football player
