= List of college men's basketball career coaching wins leaders =

This is a list of college men's basketball coaches by number of career wins across all three divisions of the National Collegiate Athletic Association (NCAA) and the two divisions of the National Association of Intercollegiate Athletics (NAIA). It is limited to coaches with at least 600 wins. Mike Krzyzewski has the most total victories for men's basketball with 1,202. The highest winning percentage for a men's coach with at least 600 wins is Mark Few's .832 at Gonzaga, where he has coached since 1999. Exhibition games and games vacated by the NCAA are not included on this list.

== College basketball coaches with 600 wins ==
=== Key ===
*	Active as of the 2025–26 season
†	Elected to the Naismith Memorial Basketball Hall of Fame as a coach
	600 wins with an NCAA Division I program (or historic equivalent)

=== Coaches ===
Statistics correct through the end of the 2025–26 season.

Rank	Name	Years	Wins	Losses	Pct.	Teams
1	Mike Krzyzewski^{†}	47	1,202	368	.766	Army (1975–1980), Duke (1980–2022)
2	Herb Magee^{†}	54	1,144	450	.718	Philadelphia Textile/Philadelphia/Jefferson (1967–2022) (Note: Jefferson did not play in the 2020–21 season due to COVID–19 concerns.)
3	Harry Statham	52	1,119	512	.686	McKendree (1967–2018)
4*	Dave Holmquist	49	1,095	462	.703	Fresno Pacific (1974–1977), Biola (1978–present)
5	Danny Miles	45	1,040	437	.704	Oregon Tech (1971–2016)
6	Jim Boeheim^{†} (Note: Jim Boeheim's total does not include 101 wins vacated by the NCAA.)	47	1,015	441	.697	Syracuse (1976–2023)
7	Glenn Robinson	48	967	359	.729	Franklin & Marshall (1971–2019)
8	Bob Huggins^{†}	41	935	414	.693	Walsh (1980–1983), Akron (1984–1989), Cincinnati (1989–2005), Kansas State (2006–2007), West Virginia (2007–2023)
9	Don Meyer	38	923	324	.740	Hamline (1972–1975), Lipscomb (1975–1999), Northern State (1999–2010)
10	Jim Calhoun^{†} (Note: Calhoun retired for the second time after coaching in 3 games in the 2021–22 season.)	44	920	397	.699	Northeastern (1972–1986), UConn (1986–2012), Saint Joseph (CT) (2018–2021)
11	Larry Holley	48	919	579	.613	Central Methodist (1969–1975), Northwest Missouri State (1977–1979), William Jewell (1979–2019)
12	Cliff Ellis	49	909	576	.612	South Alabama (1975–1984), Clemson (1984–1994), Auburn (1994–2004), Coastal Carolina (2007–2023)
13	Roy Williams^{†}	33	903	264	.774	Kansas (1988–2003), North Carolina (2003–2021)
14	Bob Knight^{†}	42	902	371	.709	Army (1965–1971), Indiana (1971–2000), Texas Tech (2001–2008)
15	Dean Smith^{†}	36	879	254	.777	North Carolina (1961–1997)
16	Adolph Rupp^{†}	41	876	190	.822	Kentucky (1930–1972)
17	Steve Moore	39	867	251	.775	Muhlenberg (1981–1987), Wooster (1987–2020)
18*	John Calipari^{†} (Note: John Calipari's total does not include 42 wins and 2 losses vacated by the NCAA.)	34	863	284	.752	UMass (1988–1996), Memphis (2000–2009), Kentucky (2009–2024), Arkansas (2024–present)
19*	Rick Barnes	39	861	435	.664	George Mason (1987–1988), Providence (1988–1994), Clemson (1994–1998), Texas (1998–2015), Tennessee (2015–present)
20*	Bill Self^{†} (Note: Bill Self's total does not include 15 wins vacated by the NCAA.)	33	840	272	.755	Oral Roberts (1993–1997), Tulsa (1997–2000), Illinois (2000–2003), Kansas (2003–present)
21	Jim Phelan	49	830	524	.613	Mount St. Mary's (1954–2003)
22*	Kelvin Sampson	37	829	361	.697	Montana Tech (1981–1985), Washington State (1987–1994), Oklahoma (1994–2006), Indiana (2006–2008), Houston (2014–present)
23	Clarence Gaines^{†}	47	828	447	.649	Winston-Salem State (1946–1993)
24	David Hixon^{†}	42	826	293	.738	Amherst (1977–2019)
25	Jerry Johnson	47	821	447	.647	LeMoyne–Owen (1958–2005)
26	Steve Knight	44	819	568	.590	William Carey (1982–2026)
27	Rollie Massimino	40	816	462	.638	Stony Brook (1969–1971), Villanova (1973–1992), UNLV (1992–1994), Cleveland State (1996–2003), Northwood (FL)/Keiser (2006–2017)
28	Willie Holley	42	813	527	.607	Mid–American Christian (1974–2015)
29*	Steve Ridder	36	811	355	.696	Embry–Riddle (1989–present)
30*	Kim Elders	34	809	316	.719	Cornerstone (1993–present)
31	Bob Chipman	38	808	353	.696	Washburn (1979–2017)
32	Eddie Sutton^{†}	37	806	326	.712	Creighton (1969–1974), Arkansas (1974–1985), Kentucky (1985–1989), Oklahoma State (1990–2006), San Francisco (2007–2008)
33	Rick Byrd	37	805	402	.667	Maryville (TN) (1978–1980), Lincoln Memorial (1983–1986), Belmont (1986–2019)
34	Rocky Lamar	33	800	410	.656	MidAmerica Nazarene (1986–2022)
35	Mike Lightfoot	30	794	285	.736	Bethel (IN) (1987–2017)
36*	Rick Pitino^{†} (Note: Rick Pitino's record does not include 123 wins and 3 losses vacated by the NCAA.)	38	792	315	.715	Hawaii (1976), Boston University (1978–1983), Providence (1985–1987), Kentucky (1989–1997), Louisville (2001–2017), Iona (2020–2023), St. John's (2023–present)
36	Dana Altman	37	792	425	.651	Marshall (1989–1990), Kansas State (1990–1994), Creighton (1994–2010), Oregon (2010–2026)
38	Bob Burchard	31	788	269	.746	Columbia (MO) (1988–2019)
38	Jim Kessler	42	788	582	.575	Grace (1977–2019)
40	Lefty Driesell^{†}	41	786	394	.666	Davidson (1960–1969), Maryland (1969–1986), James Madison (1988–1997), Georgia State (1997–2003)
40	Jim Smith	51	786	556	.586	Saint John's (MN) (1964–2015)
42	Lute Olson^{†}	34	781	279	.730	Long Beach State (1973–1974), Iowa (1974–1983), Arizona (1983–2007)
43	Lou Henson	41	779	412	.654	Hardin–Simmons (1962–1966), New Mexico State (1966–1975, 1998–2005), Illinois (1975–1996)
44	Ralph Hodge	39	775	487	.614	Olivet Nazarene (1978–2018)
45*	Mark Few^{†}	27	772	156	.832	Gonzaga (1999–present)
46*	Tom Izzo^{†}	31	764	310	.711	Michigan State (1995–present)
47	Edgar Diddle^{†}	42	759	302	.715	Western Kentucky (1922–1964)
48	Henry Iba^{†}	41	755	340	.689	Northwest Missouri State (1929–1933), Colorado (1933–1934), Oklahoma State (1934–1970)
48	Tom Klusman	44	755	489	.607	Rollins (1980–2024)
50	John Beilein	37	754	425	.640	Nazareth (1982–1983), Le Moyne (1983–1992), Canisius (1992–1997), Richmond (1997–2002), West Virginia (2002–2007), Michigan (2007–2019)
51*	Ray Shovlain	43	749	598	.556	St. Ambrose (1983–present)
52	Bo Ryan^{†}	32	747	233	.762	Wisconsin–Platteville (1984–1999), Milwaukee (1999–2001), Wisconsin (2001–2015)
53	Phog Allen^{†}	50	746	264	.739	Baker (1905–1908), Kansas (1907–1909, 1919–1956), Haskell (1908–1909), Central Missouri State (1912–1919)
54	Jim Larrañaga	40	745	507	.595	American International (1977–1979), Bowling Green (1986–1997), George Mason (1997–2011), Miami (FL) (2011–2024)
55*	Brian Baptiste	43	742	417	.640	UMass Dartmouth (1983–present)
56	John Chaney^{†}	34	741	312	.704	Cheyney (1972–1982), Temple (1982–2006)
57	Richard Schmidt	42	737	453	.619	Vanderbilt (1979–1981), Tampa (1983–2023)
58	Paul Patterson	34	734	375	.662	Taylor (1978–2013)
59*	Greg Kampe	42	731	571	.561	Oakland (1984–present)
60	Jerry Tarkanian^{†} (Note: Jerry Tarkanian's total does not include 55 wins vacated by the NCAA.)	31	729	201	.784	Long Beach State (1968–1973), UNLV (1973–1992), Fresno State (1995–2002)
60	Norm Stewart^{†}	38	729	373	.662	Northern Iowa (1961–1967), Missouri (1967–1999)
62*	Steve Alford	35	724	386	.653	Manchester (1991–1995), Southwest Missouri State (1995–1999), Iowa (1999–2007), New Mexico (2007–2013), UCLA (2013–2018), Nevada (2019–present)
62	Dan Hays	38	724	470	.606	Northwestern Oklahoma State (1978–1983), Oklahoma Christian (1983–2016)
62	Ray Meyer^{†}	42	724	354	.672	DePaul (1942–1984)
65	Jerry Slocum	41	723	556	.565	Nyack (1975–1987), Geneva (1987–1996), Gannon (1996–2005), Youngstown State (2005–2017)
66	Randy Lambert	39	722	325	.683	Maryville (TN) (1980–2020)
67	Keith Dickson	37	719	376	.657	Saint Anselm (1986–2024)
67	Don Haskins^{†}	38	719	353	.671	UTEP (1961–1999)
69	Larry Chapman	40	714	495	.591	Georgia Southern (1974–1977), Auburn–Montgomery (1977–2014)
70	Dave Robbins	30	713	194	.786	Virginia Union (1978–2008)
71	Bruce Pearl	33	706	267	.726	Southern Indiana (1992–2001), Milwaukee (2001–2005), Tennessee (2005–2011), Auburn (2014–2025)
72	Larry Hunter	37	702	453	.608	Wittenberg (1976–1989), Ohio (1989–2001), Western Carolina (2005–2018)
72	Doc Sauers	41	702	330	.680	Albany (1955–1987, 1988–1997)
74	Steve Jenkins	39	692	542	.561	Evangel (1982–2022)
75	Mark Edwards	37	685	293	.700	Washington (MO) (1981–2018)
76*	Lennie Acuff	36	678	424	.615	Belhaven (1990–1993), Berry (1993–1997), Alabama–Huntsville (1997–2019), Lipscomb (2019–2025), Samford (2025–present)
77	Mike Montgomery	32	677	317	.681	Montana (1978–1986), Stanford (1986–2004), California (2008–2014)
78	Denny Crum^{†}	30	675	295	.696	Louisville (1971–2001)
79	Lon Kruger	35	674	432	.610	UTPA (1982–1986), Kansas State (1986–1990), Florida (1990–1996), Illinois (1996–2000), UNLV (2004–2011), Oklahoma (2011–2021)
80*	Mike Nienaber	43	669	616	.521	Bethel (TN) (1983–1999), Christian Brothers (1999–2019), Delta State (2019–present)
81	Gary Williams^{†}	33	668	380	.637	American (1978–1982), Boston College (1982–1986), Ohio State (1986–1989), Maryland (1989–2011)
82	Dennis Bridges	36	666	320	.675	Illinois Wesleyan (1965–2001)
83	John Wooden^{†} (Note: John Wooden is also a member of the Naismith Hall as a player.)	29	664	162	.804	Indiana State (1946–1948), UCLA (1948–1975)
83*	Jay Lawson	34	664	335	.665	Bentley (1991–present)
85	Roger Kaiser	28	663	233	.740	West Georgia (1970–1990), Life (1991–2000)
86	Glenn Van Wieren	33	660	219	.751	Hope (1977–2010)
86	Leonard Hamilton	39	660	507	.566	Oklahoma State (1986–1990), Miami (FL) (1990–2000), Florida State (2002–2025)
88	Ralph Miller^{†}	38	657	382	.632	Wichita (1951–1964), Iowa (1964–1970), Oregon State (1970–1989)
89	Brian Beaury	33	654	343	.656	Saint Rose (1986–2018)
89	Lonn Reisman	30	654	261	.715	Tarleton (1988–2018)
91	Dick Reynolds	40	653	426	.605	Otterbein (1972–2012)
92*	Bob Hoffman	32	650	402	.618	Oklahoma Baptist (1990–1999), Texas-Pan American (1999–2004), Mercer (2008–2019), Central Oklahoma (2019–present)
93	Tom Penders	36	649	437	.598	Tufts (1971–1974), Columbia (1974–1978), Fordham (1978–1986), Rhode Island (1986–1988), Texas (1988–1998), George Washington (1998–2001), Houston (2004–2010)
94	Dick Whitmore	41	648	356	.645	Colby (1970–2011), Thomas (2014)
95	Gene Bartow	34	647	353	.647	Central Missouri State (1961–1964), Valparaiso (1964–1970), Memphis State (1970–1974), Illinois (1974–1975), UCLA (1975–1977), UAB (1978–1996)
96	Greg McDermott	32	646	384	.627	Wayne State (NE) (1994–2000), North Dakota State (2000–2001), Northern Iowa (2001–2006), Iowa State (2006–2010), Creighton (2010–2026)
96	Jeff Sherman	37	646	511	.558	Central Methodist (1985–2022)
98	Tubby Smith	30	642	370	.634	Tulsa (1991–1995), Georgia (1995–1997), Kentucky (1997–2007), Minnesota (2007–2013), Texas Tech (2013–2016), Memphis (2016–2018), High Point (2018–2022)
98	Jay Wright^{†}	28	642	282	.695	Hofstra (1994–2001), Villanova (2001–2022)
100	Billy Tubbs	31	641	340	.653	Southwestern (TX) (1971–1973), Lamar (1976–1980, 2003–2006), Oklahoma (1980–1994), TCU (1994–2002)
101	Homer Drew	34	640	427	.600	Bethel (IN) (1976–1987), Indiana–South Bend (1987–1988), Valparaiso (1988–2002, 2004–2011)
101	Stan Spirou	33	640	341	.652	Southern New Hampshire (1985–2018)
103	Marv Harshman^{†}	40	637	444	.589	Pacific Lutheran (1944–1958), Washington State (1958–1971), Washington (1971–1985)
103	John Moore	32	637	352	.644	Fresno Pacific (1988–1993), Westmont (1993–2020)
105*	Jim Boone	40	636	503	.558	California (PA) (1986–1996), Robert Morris (1996–1999), Eastern Michigan (2000–2005), Tusculum (2005–2011), West Va. Wesleyan (2011–2012), Delta State (2012–2019), Arkansas–Fort Smith (2019–2023), Greensboro College (2023–2025), Missouri Valley (2025–present)
106	Bob McKillop	33	634	381	.625	Davidson (1989–2022)
107	Hugh Durham	37	633	429	.596	Florida State (1966–1978), Georgia (1978–1995), Jacksonville (1997–2005)
108*	Todd Raridon	37	632	351	.643	Nebraska Wesleyan (1989–2004), North Central College (2004–2022), Hastings College (2022–present)
108	John Lance	44	632	340	.650	Southwestern Oklahoma (1918–1922), Pittsburg State (1922–1934, 1935–1963)
110	Ken Anderson	27	631	152	.806	Wisconsin–Eau Claire (1968–1995)
110	Cam Henderson	36	631	242	.723	Muskingum (1919–1923), Davis & Elkins (1923–1935), Marshall (1935–1955)
112	Ed Messbarger	41	630	518	.549	Benedictine Heights (1957–1960), Dallas (1960–1963), St. Mary's (TX) (1963–1998), Angelo State (1978–1998)
113	Mike Neer	37	629	346	.645	Rochester (1976–2010), Hobart (2011–2014)
114	Fran Dunphy	33	625	380	.622	Penn (1989–2006), Temple (2006–2019), La Salle (2022–2025)
115	Norm Sloan	37	624	393	.614	Presbyterian (1951–1955), The Citadel (1956–1960), Florida (1960–1966, 1980–1989), NC State (1966–1980)
116	Dick Peth	39	622	415	.600	Denver (1985–1997), Wartburg (1997–2024)
117	Stew Morrill	29	620	294	.678	Montana (1986–1991), Colorado State (1991–1998), Utah State (1998–2015)
117	Dean Nicholson	26	620	199	.757	Central Washington (1964–1990)
119	Tom Murphy	35	618	274	.693	Hamilton (1970–2004), SUNY Poly (2005–2006)
119	Tom Smith	38	618	463	.572	Central Missouri (1975–1980), Valparaiso (1980–1988), Missouri Western (1988–2013)
121	Ben Braun	37	615	517	.543	Siena Heights (1977–1985), Eastern Michigan (1985–1996), California (1996–2008), Rice (2008–2014)
122	Al Bruehl	25	609	202	.751	Trinity International (1993–1997), Robert Morris (IL) (1997–2017)
122	Jerry Steele	39	609	486	.556	Guilford (1962–1970), High Point (1972–2003)
124	Rich Glas	37	608	413	.595	Minnesota–Morris (1974–1979), Willamette (1979–1984), North Dakota (1988–2006), Concordia (Moorhead) (2008–2017)
125*	Scott Nagy	31	607	367	.623	South Dakota State (1995–2016), Wright State (2016–2024), Southern Illinois (2024–present)
126	Mark A. Corino	40	606	494	.551	Bloomfield (1982–1987), Caldwell (1988–2022)
127	Bill Nelson	37	605	362	.626	RIT (1980–1983), Nazareth (1983–1986), Johns Hopkins (1986–2017)
128	Dave Boots	31	603	291	.674	Augsburg (1982–1988), South Dakota (1988–2013)
128	Gerry Matthews	30	603	243	.713	Stockton (1985–2016)
130*	Dip Metress	30	601	280	.682	Belmont Abbey (1996–2004), Augusta (2004–present)
131*	Dave Niland	31	600	258	.699	Penn State Behrend (1994–present)
131*	Herb Sendek	32	600	424	.586	Miami (OH) (1993–1996), NC State (1996–2006), Arizona State (2006–2015), Santa Clara (2016–present)

== See also ==
- List of NBA head coaches with 500 games coached
- Gene Bess, junior college coach with 1,300 wins
