= Danny Miles =

American multi-sport athlete and basketball coach

Biographical details
- Born: October 9, 1945 (age 81); Medford, Oregon, U.S.

Playing career
- 1964–1968: Southern Oregon
- Positions: Quarterback, shortstop, point guard

Coaching career (HC unless noted)
- 1971–2016: Oregon Tech

Head coaching record
- Overall: 1,040–437 (.704)

Accomplishments and honors

Championships
- 3× NAIA Division II champion (2004, 2008, 2012); 9× conference tournament (1974, 1979, 1987, 2000, 2006, 2009-2012); 14× conference regular season (1974, 1979, 1986-1988, 1997, 2000-2001, 2005, 2007, 2009-2012)

Awards
- Coach Wooden "Keys to Life" Award (2015); 2× NAIA National Basketball Coach of the Year (2004, 2008); NABC NAIA Division II Coach of the Year (2012)
- College Basketball Hall of Fame; Inducted in 2018

Danny Miles (born October 9, 1945) is a retired American basketball coach. He served as the head men's basketball coach at Oregon Institute of Technology for 45 years from 1971 to 2016. Miles has led the Hustlin' Owls to three NAIA Division II National Championships. He achieved his 1,000th win on February 1, 2014, in his 43rd year of coaching at OIT. This is the fourth most of any men's college basketball coach all-time (NCAA & NAIA). The other coaches at a four-year school with 1,000 or more wins are: Harry Statham, coach of McKendree University, Mike Krzyzewski, coach of Duke University, Herb Magee, coach of Philadelphia University, and Dave Holmquist, coach of Biola University.

On March 29, 2018 Miles was named to the National Collegiate Basketball Hall of Fame.

== Playing career ==
Miles was known as a multi-sport athlete competing in baseball, football, and basketball. In 1962, he won the Oregon class 4A state championship in football and in 1963 he was recognized as the outstanding athlete at Medford High School (now known as North Medford). Miles received a scholarship for baseball from Oregon State University, but then enrolled at Southern Oregon State College (now Southern Oregon University) after an injury beginning in 1964. While at SOU, Miles continued as a multi-sport athlete and attained the following honors:

- Football All-American (honorable mention) 1964, 1965, 1966
- Baseball All- Conference 1965, 1966, 1967
- Basketball All-Conference (Honorable mention) 1965
- Collegiate NAIA football record holder for passing percentage in a season from 1965–2020 (190–247) 76.9%. Was surpassed for all levels by Alabama's Mac Jones in 2020 (311–402) 77.36%. Bo Nix of Oregon holds the current record at 77.45% from the 2023 season.
- Led NAIA in total offense (255.3) yds per game
- SOU Hall of Fame (1989)
- Oregon Sports Hall of Fame (Multi-sport athlete) (1996)

== Coaching career ==
=== Oregon Tech ===
Miles was first hired by the Oregon Institute of Technology as an assistant coach for football, basketball and baseball in 1970. He said he thought he would become a college football coach and wanted to work in NCAA Division I in that sport. After his first year at Oregon Tech, Miles was promoted to the head coaching job both in basketball and baseball as well as offensive coordinator in football. During his 45 years as men's basketball head coach at Oregon Tech, the Hustlin' Owls won an NAIA record 1040 games while losing 437, for a .704 winning percentage. He had 10 seasons of 30 or more wins. During his career, he guided Oregon Tech to home-game winning streaks of 49 games and 64 games respectively.

Miles is known for his Value Point System, which he created and used. The system was described as providing "an all-encompassing look at how players and teams perform by weighing their positive contributions against their negative ones. The resulting number shows how effective the player is. A VPS of 1 is considered average, while anything north of 2 is elite." The system uses a score which "is calculated by using a mathematical formula that includes relevant basketball statistics."

Standout players that played under Miles at Oregon Tech included: Rafid Kiti (All-American First Team 1994), Saif Abdur-Rahman (All-American First Team 1999), LaMont Swinson (All-American First Team 2001), Todd Matthews (All-American Third Team 2003), Levell Hesia (All-American First Team 2005, All-American Second Team 2006, 2007), Ryan Fiegi (All-American Second Team 2007, All-American First Team 2008), Jguwon Hogges (All-American First Team 2009), Justin Parnell (All-American First Team 2010), Joseph Foster (All-American First Team 2011), Bobby Hunter (All-American First Team 2012).

A German coach, who served as Miles' assistant at Oregon Tech for one year, made him aware of Dirk Nowitzki. Miles went to Würzburg, Germany, when Nowitzki was 17 years old and tried to recruit Nowitzki for his team. However, the German had already high paying offers from professional basketball teams on the table. Miles instead recruited two of Nowitzki's teammates. During his tenure at Oregon Tech, Miles had a total of 28 international players on his teams from countries like Australia, Germany, and Mexico.

For more than ten years, Miles coached at basketball clinics in France during the summer break. In 2010 and 2011, Miles was involved in the Athletes In Action program which included working at basketball clinics in Kenya and Rwanda.

During his time at Oregon Tech, Miles was also the head softball coach for ten years with a 344–185 (.650) record while being named conference coach of the year six times. Over seven years as the head baseball coach at Oregon Tech, his record was 132–103 (.562).

=== Retirement ===
On July 17, 2014 Miles announced that he would retire effective July 2016 at the end of his 45th year at OIT. Justin Parnell, a former player of his, was named as his successor at OIT.

== Life after coaching ==
In April 2016, Miles became the assistant athletic director at Cascade Christian High School in Medford, Oregon. In October 2017, Miles became the head athletic director at Cascade Christian. In June 2018, Miles transitioned back into a mentorship role at Cascade Christian.

== Awards and honors ==
- Medford High School Sports Hall of Fame
- City of Medford Sports Hall of Fame
- French Men's Basketball National Team U14 Assistant Coach (1996)
- NAIA Hall of Fame - Basketball Coach (1996)
- Oregon Institute of Technology Basketball Court named "Danny Miles Court" (1996)
- 2x NAIA National Basketball Coach of the Year (2004, 2008)
- A.T. Slats Gill All-Sports Coach of the Year (2004)
- National winner of NAIA's Champion of Character award for all sports (2009)
- USA Basketball Men's U19 National Team Training Camp - Court Coach (2011)
- DNA Award at the Oregon Sports Award show (2012)
- National Association of Basketball Coaches NAIA Division II Coach of the Year (2012)
- Guardians of the Game Pillar Award for Advocacy from the National Association of Basketball Coaches (2013)
- John Wooden "Keys to Life" Award at the legends of the Hardwood Breakfast - Final Four Indianapolis (2015)
- "Danny Miles Way", street named in his honor (2016)
- Naismith Memorial Basketball Hall of Fame Candidate (2016, 2017, 2018, 2019, 2020, 2021, 2022)
- Small College Basketball Hall of Fame (2019)
- Oregon Institute of Technology Hall of Fame (2022)
- Oregon Sports Hall of Fame (2004, 2008, 2012 National Championship Teams) (2022)

== Head coaching record ==
Record table
| Season | Team | Overall | Conference | Standing | Postseason |
|---|---|---|---|---|---|
Oregon Tech Hustlin' Owls (Evergreen Conference) (1971–1980)
| 1971–72 | Oregon Tech | 11–15 | 5–7 | 5th | |
| 1972–73 | Oregon Tech | 14–12 | 5–7 | 4th | |
| 1973–74 | Oregon Tech | 25–5 | 8–4 | 1st | NAIA Division I Round of 32 |
| 1974–75 | Oregon Tech | 25–4 | 9–3 | 2nd | |
| 1975–76 | Oregon Tech | 18–10 | 7–5 | 3rd | |
| 1976–77 | Oregon Tech | 22–6 | 7–5 | 3rd | |
| 1977–78 | Oregon Tech | 17–11 | 8–4 | 3rd | |
| 1978–79 | Oregon Tech | 24–6 | 5–3 | 1st | NAIA Division I Round of 32 |
| 1979–80 | Oregon Tech | 19–11 | 8–4 | 2nd | |
Oregon Tech Hustlin' Owls (Sempter System) (1980–1985)
| 1980–81 | Oregon Tech | 19–13 | | | |
| 1981–82 | Oregon Tech | 20–10 | | | |
| 1982–83 | Oregon Tech | 20–12 | | | |
| 1983–84 | Oregon Tech | 18–14 | | | |
| 1984–85 | Oregon Tech | 13–15 | | | |
Oregon Tech Hustlin' Owls (District II Western Division) (1985–1991)
| 1985–86 | Oregon Tech | 32–9 | 13–1 | 1st | |
| 1986–87 | Oregon Tech | 33–5 | 13–1 | 1st | NAIA Division I Sweet 16 |
| 1987–88 | Oregon Tech | 27–6 | 9–3 | 1st | |
| 1988–89 | Oregon Tech | 26–9 | 7–5 | 2nd | |
| 1989–90 | Oregon Tech | 24–12 | 8–4 | 2nd | |
| 1990–91 | Oregon Tech | 15–17 | 8–6 | 4th | |
Oregon Tech Hustlin' Owls (Independent) (1991–1992)
| 1991–92 | Oregon Tech | 21–11 | 13–7 | 3rd | |
Oregon Tech Hustlin' Owls (Cascade Collegiate Conference) (1992–2016)
| 1992–93 | Oregon Tech | 12–16 | 6–10 | 7th | |
| 1993–94 | Oregon Tech | 20–13 | 7–9 | 6th | |
| 1994–95 | Oregon Tech | 20–13 | 7–9 | 5th | |
| 1995–96 | Oregon Tech | 17–13 | 6–8 | 5th | |
| 1996–97 | Oregon Tech | 30–5 | 12–2 | 1st | NAIA Division II Sweet 16 |
| 1997–98 | Oregon Tech | 26–11 | 13–5 | 3rd | NAIA Division II Runner-up |
| 1998–99 | Oregon Tech | 25–8 | 10–6 | 3rd | |
| 1999–00 | Oregon Tech | 30–7 | 12–4 | 2nd | NAIA Division II Elite Eight |
| 2000–01 | Oregon Tech | 32–6 | 16–2 | 1st | NAIA Division II Elite Eight |
| 2001–02 | Oregon Tech | 22–11 | 11–7 | 4th | |
| 2002–03 | Oregon Tech | 27–7 | 13–5 | 3rd | NAIA Division II Sweet 16 |
| 2003–04 | Oregon Tech | 31–9 | 14–4 | 2nd | NAIA Division II Champion |
| 2004–05 | Oregon Tech | 28–10 | 14–4 | 1st | NAIA Division II Final Four |
| 2005–06 | Oregon Tech | 26–9 | 11–7 | 3rd | NAIA Division II Sweet 16 |
| 2006–07 | Oregon Tech | 28–5 | 15–3 | 1st | NAIA Division II Sweet 16 |
| 2007–08 | Oregon Tech | 31–6 | 16–4 | 2nd | NAIA Division II Champion |
| 2008–09 | Oregon Tech | 29–6 | 15–5 | 1st | NAIA Division II Sweet 16 |
| 2009–10 | Oregon Tech | 30–5 | 15–3 | 1st | NAIA Division II Sweet 16 |
| 2010–11 | Oregon Tech | 30–5 | 16–2 | 1st | NAIA Division II Sweet 16 |
| 2011–12 | Oregon Tech | 34–4 | 15–3 | 1st | NAIA Division II Champion |
| 2012–13 | Oregon Tech | 16–15 | 7–11 | 7th | |
| 2013–14 | Oregon Tech | 17–15 | 9–9 | 7th | |
| 2014–15 | Oregon Tech | 13–16 | 6–12 | 8th | |
| 2015–16 | Oregon Tech | 23–9 | 12–8 | 5th | |
| Oregon Tech: | | 1,040–437 (.704) | 411–211 (.661) | | |
| Total: | | 1,040–437 (.704) | | | |
National champion Postseason invitational champion Conference regular season champion Conference regular season and conference tournament champion Division regular season champion Division regular season and conference tournament champion Conference tournament champion

== See also ==
- List of college men's basketball career coaching wins leaders
