= Rocky Lamar =

American basketball coach

Jon "Rocky" Lamar is an American retired college basketball coach.

== Career ==
Born in Indiana and grown up in Iowa, Lamar attended Maquoketa High School, where he played basketball for coach Bill Fleming. He then got a scholarship to play basketball for Mid-America Nazarene College (which would later become MidAmerica Nazarene University). He set school career records for free throw percentage and assists per game.

Lamar who graduated in 1976 and later earned a master's degree in Educational Administration from the University of Kansas, started his coaching career at the high school level. Following a three-year stint at Central City, Iowa, he found himself on the coaching sidelines at Blakesburg, Iowa, where he stayed for five years.

In 1986, Lamar was hired as head coach of the Mid-America Nazarene College men's basketball team. He guided the MidAmerica Nazarene Pioneers to the NAIA Division II Men's Basketball National Championship in 2007, the championship game in 2001 and five more NAIA Final Four appearances (2006, 2008, 2009, 2014, 2016). Under coach Lamar, the team won 13 conference championships (1990, 1992, 1995, 1996, 1999, 2000, 2003, 2004, 2007, 2008, 2009, 2012, 2016) and earned 19 NAIA national tournament invitations (1992, 1995, 1996, 1999, 2000, 2001, 2002, 2003, 2004, 2005, 2006, 2007, 2008, 2009, 2012, 2013, 2014, 2016, 2020). In the NCCAA National Tournament, his Pioneers claimed runner-up spots in 1997 and 1998. Over the years, his players won 37 All-America honors, including All-America First Team honors for Peter Martin (1992), Bill Elliot (1993), Dan Peterson (1999 and 2000), Dan Fleming (2001), Adam Hepker (2007 and 2008) and Danny Hawkins (2008 and 2009). Lamar coached MidAmerica Nazarene to 23 seasons with at least 20 wins. Prior to his tenure, the Pioneers never experienced a 20-win season. In 2015, Lamar was selected as a head coach for the NABC-NAIA Men's Basketball All-Star Game alongside Danny Miles.

On January 29, 2022, Lamar recorded his 800th career win and was the winningest active coach in the NAIA with a total of 803 career victories when he retired in February 2022. His former player Adam Hepker, who served as an assistant to Lamar for five years from 2010 to 2015 and in 2021–22, was named as his successor.

In 2008, the floor at Mid-America Nazarene's Bell Family Arena was named Rocky Lamar Court. Lamar was inducted into the NAIA Hall of Fame in 2014. He is the founder of the Rocky Lamar Fundamentally Driven Basketball Camp, held in the summertime.

=== Honors ===
- Small College Basketball National Awards Special Recognition (2022)
- NAIA Hall of Fame (2014)
- Greater Kansas City Basketball Coaches Association Hall of Fame (2008)
- NAIA Division II Coach of the Year (2007)
- Kansas Basketball Coaches Association Coach of the Year (2007, 2008)
- Heart of America Athletic Conference Coach of the Year (1990, 1992, 1995, 2000, 2007, 2012, 2016, 2022)
- MidAmerica Nazarene University Athletics Hall of Fame (1984)

== See also ==
- List of college men's basketball coaches with 600 wins
