= Ben Hunt (basketball) =

Australian basketball player

Personal information
- Born: 6 June 1978 (age 46); Bendigo, Victoria, Australia
- Listed height: 188 cm (6 ft 2 in)
- Listed weight: 82 kg (181 lb)

Career information
- High school: Bendigo Senior Secondary College (Bendigo, Victoria)
- College: Stephen F. Austin (2001–2003); Texas Wesleyan (2004–2006)
- NBA draft: 2006: undrafted
- Playing career: 1994–2008
- Position: Point guard

Career history
- 1994–2001: Bendigo Braves
- 2003: Bendigo Braves
- 2004: Ballarat Miners
- 2006–2008: Perth Wildcats
- 2007–2008: Willetton Tigers

Career highlights and awards
- SBL All Star Second Team (2007); SBL All Star Third Team (2008); 2× All-SEABL South Team (2000, 2001); SEABL South Youth Player of the Year (2000); NAIA D1 National Tournament winner (2006); NAIA D1 All-Tournament Team (2006); Second-team NAIA D1 All-American (2006); RRAC Co-Player of the Year (2006); 2× First-team All-RRAC (2005, 2006)

Ben Hunt (born 6 June 1978) is an Australian former professional basketball player. He began his basketball career in the SEABL with the Bendigo Braves before playing four years of college basketball in the United States. He then had a two-year stint in the National Basketball League (NBL) with the Perth Wildcats.

== Early life and career ==
Hunt was born in Bendigo, Victoria, and attended Bendigo Senior Secondary College. He made his debut for the Bendigo Braves in the SEABL in 1994. He played every year for the Braves until 2001. He earned All-SEABL South Conference Team honours in 2000 and 2001, and was named the SEABL South Conference Youth Player of the Year in 2000.

== College career ==
Between 2001 and 2003, Hunt played Division I college basketball in the United States for the Stephen F. Austin Lumberjacks. In 57 games over two seasons, he averaged 6.8 points, 1.8 rebounds and 1.5 assists per game.

Hunt returned to Australia in 2003 and played a ninth season for the Braves. In 2004, he left the Braves and played the SEABL season with the Ballarat Miners.

Hunt returned to the United States in 2004 to play his final two college seasons at Texas Wesleyan University of the Red River Athletic Conference (RRAC) in the National Association of Intercollegiate Athletics (NAIA). With the Rams, Hunt earned first-team All-RRAC in both 2004–05 and 2005–06, to go with winning Co-Player of the Year in 2005–06. He was also second-team All-American, All-NAIA National Tournament and Texas Wesleyan Athlete of the Year in 2005–06. He led the Rams to the 2006 NAIA Division 1 national championship, scoring a career-high 34 points and hitting the game winning shot in the title game.

== Professional career ==
In March 2006, Hunt had an unsuccessful trial with the Dallas Mavericks of the NBA. He received another opportunity with the Mavericks in July 2006 when he joined the team for the NBA Summer League.

Following his Summer League stint, Hunt returned to Australia and joined the Perth Wildcats for the 2006–07 NBL season. In his rookie season, he averaged 3.6 points in 30 games. He remained in Perth during the 2007 off-season and played for the Willetton Tigers in the State Basketball League (SBL), where he earned SBL All Star Second Team honours. With the Wildcats in 2007–08, he averaged 4.3 points in 31 games. A point guard for his entire career, Hunt took on the challenge of shooting guard during his second season with the Wildcats. Following the NBL season, he re-joined the Willetton Tigers for the SBL season, where he earned SBL All Star Third Team honours.

== National team career ==
In 2005, Hunt played for the Australian University National Team at the Summer Universiade in İzmir, Turkey. He scored a game-high 28 points in a quarter-final loss to the United States.

== Personal life ==
Hunt is the son of Peter and Ricki, and he has an older brother, Josh. Hunt is married to wife Erin.
