= Biola Eagles men's basketball =

Men's basketball team of Biola University

The Biola Eagles men's basketball team represents Biola University in La Mirada, California, in NCAA Division II men's college basketball. The Eagles compete in the Pacific West Conference (PacWest) and have played at the NCAA Division II level since 2017, after spending most of the program's history in the National Association of Intercollegiate Athletics (NAIA).

The program's most successful season came in 1981–82, when the team finished 39–1 and was the NAIA Division I national runner-up. Its longtime head coach, Dave Holmquist, surpassed 1,000 career coaching victories in 2021. Biola also won National Christian College Athletic Association (NCCAA) Division I national championships in 1976 and 1978.

== History ==
=== NAIA era (1960–2017) ===
Biola began varsity men's basketball in the 1960–61 season. The program became a national contender under Howard Lyon and Dave Holmquist, who shared head-coaching duties for much of the 1980s. Under Lyon, Biola won NCCAA Division I national championships in 1976 and 1978.

The 1981–82 team went 39–1 and reached the NAIA Division I championship game, where it lost 51–38 to South Carolina–Spartanburg. Holmquist became the team's sole head coach by 1990 and compiled one of the winningest records in college basketball history, reaching his 1,000th career victory on February 27, 2021. He was inducted into the NAIA Hall of Fame in 2002, and in 2016 was named the National Association of Basketball Coaches (NABC) NAIA Division I Coach of the Year.

=== NCAA Division II era (2017–present) ===
Biola moved from the NAIA to NCAA Division II and joined the Pacific West Conference beginning with the 2017–18 season. In 2020–21 the Eagles reached the NCAA Division II West Region semifinals for the first time in program history.

== Head coaches ==
| Coach | Tenure |
|---|---|
| Bill Fisher | 1960–1963 |
| Ed Norman and Richard Chase | 1963–1964 |
| JD Sarver | 1964–1968 |
| Jim Poteet | 1968–1971 |
| Howard Lyon | 1971–1990 |
| Dave Holmquist | 1978–present |

Lyon and Holmquist co-coached the team for much of the 1978–1988 period before Holmquist became the sole head coach.

== Honors ==
- NAIA Division I national runner-up: 1982
- NCCAA Division I national champions: 1976, 1978
- GSAC tournament champions: 2012, 2016
- NABC NAIA Division I Coach of the Year: Dave Holmquist (2016)
