= Jim Kessler =

American basketball coach

Jim Kessler (born December 21, 1948) is an American retired college basketball coach.

== Career ==
Kessler is a 1966 graduate of Northwest High School in Hughesville, Missouri. He played four years of college basketball at Grace College, graduating in 1970. Since 6th grade he wanted to become a coach. He started coaching in high school and came back to Grace College in 1975, where he served as an assistant coach for two years, before being named head coach in 1977.

Kessler, often referred to as Coach K, stayed on the job until 2019. He was also an associate professor of physical education. In 42 years as head men's basketball coach at Grace, he won 788 games. He led Grace to the 1992 NAIA Division II National Championship title, won ten conference championships and qualified for the NAIA National Tournament nine times. Under his guidance, Grace was a NCCAA National runners-up four times. During Kessler's tenure, the Grace Lancers had 18 seasons with 20 wins or more and three with 30 wins or more. He took his teams to international trips to countries including Philippines, Jamaica, Bahamas, Egypt, Germany, France and Kenya. In 2013, Kessler was a court coach at USA Basketball's World University Games’ Training Camp. He retired as the winningest active coach in NAIA Division II basketball.

After retiring as head coach in 2019, Kessler became Special Assistant to the Athletic Director at Grace College.

=== Honors ===
- NAIA National Coach of the Year (1992)
- NCCAA National Coach of the Year (1983, 1992)
- NCCAA Hall of Fame (Class of 1994)
- NAIA Coach of Character (2005)
- NABC Guardians of the Game National Award for Service (2006)
- Grace College Hall of Fame (Class of 2008)
- Crossroads League Coach of the Year (2009)
- NAIA Hall of Fame (Class of 2015)
- Indiana Basketball Hall of Fame (Class of 2020)
- Jim Haney Master Coach Award (2026)

== See also ==
- List of college men's basketball coaches with 600 wins
