= Justin Parnell =

American basketball player and coach

Biographical details
- Born: Sutherlin, Oregon, U.S.

Playing career
- 2006–2008: Northwest Nazarene
- 2008–2010: Oregon Tech
- Position: Shooting guard

Coaching career (HC unless noted)
- 2011–2015: Oregon Tech (assistant)
- 2016–present: Oregon Tech

Head coaching record
- Overall: 193-74

Accomplishments and honors

Championships
- 1× Conference regular season (2019); 1× Conference tournament champion (2024); 7× NAIA National Tournament Appearances (2016-2019, 2022-25)

Awards
- Cascade Conference Coach of the Year (2019); NABC 30 Under 30 Team (2018)

Justin Parnell (born 1988) is an American basketball coach. Since 2016 he has served as the head men's basketball coach at the Oregon Institute of Technology.

== Coaching career ==
=== Oregon Tech ===
In 2016, the Oregon Institute of Technology hired Parnell, replacing previous coach of 45 years Danny Miles.

== Awards and honors ==
- Cascade Conference Coach of the Year (2019)
- NABC 30 Under 30 Team (2018)

== Head coaching record ==
Record table
Season	Team	Overall	Conference	Standing	Postseason
Oregon Tech Hustlin' Owls (Cascade Collegiate Conference) (2016–2024)
2016-2017	Oregon Tech	24-10	15-5	2nd	NAIA Division II Round of 32
2017-2018	Oregon Tech	22-11	14-6	3rd	NAIA Division II Round of 32
2018-2019	Oregon Tech	28-8	15-3	1st	NAIA Division II Runner-up
2019-2020	Oregon Tech	26-7	14-6	3rd	2020 NAIA Division II men's basketball tournament
2020-2021	Oregon Tech	7-2	6-2	2nd	No Tournament COVID
2021-2022	Oregon Tech	22-11	18-4	2nd	NAIA Tournament Second Round
2022-2023	Oregon Tech	14-15	11-11	6th	
2023-2024	Oregon Tech	27-6	18-4	3rd	NAIA Tournament Second Round
2024-2025	Oregon Tech	23-8	18-4	2nd	NAIA Tournament Second Round
Oregon Tech:		193-74 (.723)	129-46 (.737)		
Total:		193–74 (.723)			
National champion Postseason invitational champion Conference regular season champion Conference regular season and conference tournament champion Division regular season champion Division regular season and conference tournament champion Conference tournament champion
