= Jerry Johnson (basketball, born 1918) =

American basketball coach (1918–2021)

Jerry C. Johnson (June 20, 1918 – January 24, 2021) was an American college basketball head coach.

== Biography ==
Johnson grew up in Tulsa, Oklahoma. As a guard, he played basketball at Wiley College and later earned his undergraduate degree from Fayetteville State University.

Johnson learned the game of basketball from John McLendon, who was a student of James Naismith.

From 1947 to 1951, Johnson was a basketball and football coach at Ridgeview High School in North Carolina. He coached the football team to conference titles in every year as well as three Western regional titles, winning the state championship in 1950. Johnson led the school's basketball team to state championship titles in 1947, 1948, 1949 and 1950. His basketball team was also a national runner-up.

He was a coach at Maryland State College and in 1958, Johnson became the head men's basketball coach at LeMoyne College in Memphis. He also served as athletic director. In 1968, the institution merged with Owen Junior College to form LeMoyne-Owen College. In his 46-year stint as head coach of the team, Johnson recorded 821 wins, guided the team to five championship titles in the Volunteer State Athletic Conference (VSAC), and another five in the Southern Intercollegiate Athletic Conference (SIAC). In 1975, he led LeMoyne-Owen to the NCAA Division III Championship. He was the first African American coach to capture this title. Johnson retired in 2005. The gymnasium at LeMoyne-Owen College was named after him.

Johnson was the coach and mentor of eight players who would later play in the NBA. He was presented with the VSAC Coach of the Year award four times and was named SIAC Coach of the Year three times. As a coach, Johnson was described as "very strict", but also "very fair".

In 2020, Johnson's story was featured in the documentary "1st Forgotten Champions: The Legacy of Jerry C. Johnson“.

He died on January 24, 2021, at the age of 102.

== Honors ==
- VSAC Coach of the Year (1971, 1972, 1973, 1974)
- SIAC Coach of the Year (1999, 2000, 2005)
- Inducted into the Fayetteville State University Athletics Hall of Fame in 1989
- Inducted into the SIAC Basketball Hall of Fame in 1995
- City of Memphis Lifetime Achievement Award (2005)
- Inducted into the Tennessee Sports Hall of Fame in 2006
- Inducted into the Catawba County Sports Hall of Fame in 2017

== See also ==
- List of college men's basketball coaches with 600 wins
