= Bob Burchard =

American basketball coach

Bob Burchard is a retired men's basketball coach who spent 31 seasons as the head coach at Columbia College in Missouri. He compiled a record of 788-269 (.746 win percentage) before retiring at the end of the 2018-19 season.

His teams advanced to the NAIA Men's Basketball tournaments 22 times including 21 of his last 25 seasons. Burchard was named American Midwest Conference coach of the year 12 times.

In May 1996, Burchard earned the Columbia Kiwanis Don Faurot Sportsperson of the Year Award (named after the former University of Missouri football coach). In the summer of 2008, he was also inducted to the Missouri Basketball Coaches Association (MBCA) Hall of Fame. During the 2010 NCAA Final Four, Coach Burchard received the Guardians of the Game Leadership Pillar Award. (Guardians of the Game is a national awareness and education program that focuses on the positive aspects of basketball and the interaction of coach-student/athlete).

== See also ==
- List of college men's basketball coaches with 600 wins
