= Dave Holmquist =

American basketball coach (born 1951)

Current position
- Title: Head coach
- Team: Biola
- Conference: PacWest
- Record: 1,044–404 (.721)

Biographical details
- Born: May 1, 1951 (age 75); Minneapolis, Minnesota, U.S.

Playing career
- 1972–1974: Biola

Coaching career (HC unless noted)
- 1975–1978: Fresno Pacific
- 1978–1982: Biola (co-HC)
- 1983–1988: Biola (co-HC)
- 1988–1989: Biola
- 1990–present: Biola

Head coaching record
- Overall: 1,080–447 (.707)

Dave Holmquist (born May 1, 1951) is an American basketball coach. He is the head men's basketball coach at Biola University in La Mirada, California.

== Career ==
Holmquist spent two years at Cypress College under coach Don Johnson before transferring to Biola University, where he played from 1972 to 1974.

He began his coaching career at Fresno Pacific University in 1975–76. During his three-year stint, Holmquist recorded 36 wins and 43 losses. He moved to Biola in 1978, where Holmquist served as Co-Head Coach alongside Howard Lyon. In 1982, they led Biola to the NAIA National Championship Game and to the NCCAA National Championship in 1984. Following Lyon's resignation in 1988, Holmquist became the lone coach. Holmquist did not coach the Biola team in the 1989–90 season to focus on his duties as athletic director, before carrying out the two roles until the end of the 2015–16 school year, when he retired from his 27-year stint as athletic director. Holmquist took this decision prior to Biola's transition from NAIA to NCAA Division II in accordance with NCAA rules.

On November 24, 2015, Holmquist became the eighth men's college basketball coach in NCAA history to reach 900 career wins. On February 27, 2021, Holmquist became the fifth to reach 1000 career wins. He finished the 2025–26 season with an overall coaching record of 1,059–417.

Under his guidance, three of his players earned Golden State Athletic Conference (GSAC) Player of the Year honors: Matt Garrison (1996–97), Nate Strong (2001–02) and Dakari Archer (2015–16). Some of his players went on to play professionally overseas, including Johnny Griffin (Class of 1988, played in Argentina, Austria, Germany), Emilio Kovačić (Class of 1992, played in Croatia, Italy, Slovenia), Kellan Eckle (Class of 2004, played in Germany), Brandon Warner (Class of 2006, played in Germany), Rocky Hampton (Class of 2010, played in Austria), Davey Hopkins (Class of 2012, played in Germany), David Cline (Class of 2013, played in Germany), Andre Murillo (Class of 2014, played in Germany).

Holmquist holds a doctorate in physical education and has completed five master's degrees—in physical education, marriage and child counseling, European history, theology, philosophy, all of which are from Biola University.

== Honors ==
- NAIA Hall of Fame, Class of 2002
- NAIA Co-Coach of the Year 1981–82 (with Howard Lyon)
- NAIA Coach of the Year 2016 (by NABC)
- NAIA District III Coach of the Year 1981–82, 1987–88, 1990–91, 1991–92
- NAIA Coach Sportsmanship Award 1981–82, 1998–99, 1999–2000, 2004–05
- GSAC Coach of the Year 1996–97, 2001–02, 2003–04, 2015–16
- Harry Statham Coach of Impact Award 2024 (by Small College Basketball)

== Head coaching record ==
Record table
Season	Team	Overall	Conference	Standing	Postseason
Fresno Pacific () (1975–1978)
1975–76	Fresno Pacific	8–17			
1976–77	Fresno Pacific	13–14			
1977–78	Fresno Pacific	15–12			
Fresno Pacific:		36–43 (.456)			
Biola Eagles () (1978–1982)
1978–79	Biola	17–15	11–3		NCCAA Division I First Round
1979–80	Biola	26–4	7–1	1st	NAIA Division I Second Round
1980–81	Biola	25–7	17–1	1st	NAIA Division I Second Round
1981–82	Biola	39–1	13–0	1st	NAIA Division I Runner-up
Biola Eagles () (1983–1989)
1983–84	Biola	25–6	12–1	T–1st	NCCAA Division I Champion
1984–85	Biola	29–4	10–2	T–1st	NAIA Division I First Round
1985–86	Biola	25–7	10–3	T–2nd	NCCAA Division I Regional Final
1986–87	Biola	29–2	17–1	1st	NAIA Division I First Round
1987–88	Biola	31–5	15–2	1st	NCCAA Division I Third Round
1988–89	Biola	29–8	16–4	2nd	NAIA Division I First Round
Biola Eagles () (1990–1994)
1990–91	Biola	26–7	13–3	1st	
1991–92	Biola	33–4	13–1	1st	NAIA Division I Third Round
1992–93	Biola	21–12	10–7	3rd	
1993–94	Biola	24–10			
Biola Eagles (Golden State Athletic Conference) (1994–2017)
1994–95	Biola	10–21	3–11	T–7th	
1995–96	Biola	20–11	6–8	5th	
1996–97	Biola	28–6	11–3	2nd	NAIA Division I Second Round
1997–98	Biola	30–7	10–4	3rd	NAIA Division I Second Round
1998–99	Biola	29–8	10–4	3rd	NAIA Division I Third Round
1999–00	Biola	28–7	15–3	2nd	NAIA Division I Semifinal
2000–01	Biola	26–7	13–5	T–2nd	NAIA Division I Second Round
2001–02	Biola	29–5	17–3	1st	NAIA Division I Second Round
2002–03	Biola	21–11	11–9	5th	
2003–04	Biola	22–10	13–7	3rd	NAIA Division I First Round
2004–05	Biola	28–8	14–6	2nd	NAIA Division I Second Round
2005–06	Biola	19–12	11–9	T–5th	
2006–07	Biola	15–16	9–11	7th	
2007–08	Biola	17–14	9–11	T–8th	
2008–09	Biola	22–10	13–7	4th	NAIA Division I First Round
2009–10	Biola	29–6	16–4	2nd	NAIA Division I Third Round
2010–11	Biola	28–6	16–4	2nd	NAIA Division I Third Round
2011–12	Biola	27–9	12–6	T–2nd	NAIA Division I Third Round
2012–13	Biola	16–15	5–9	T–6th	
2013–14	Biola	16–15	6–8	T–4th	
2014–15	Biola	16–15	4–12	7th	
2015–16	Biola	30–4	14–2	1st	NAIA Division I Second Round
2016–17	Biola	26–6	12–4	2nd	NAIA Division I First Round
Biola Eagles (PacWest Conference) (2017–present)
2017–18	Biola	11–17	5–15	T–11th	
2018–19	Biola	15–13	11–11	T–5th	
2019–20	Biola	19–12	13–9	5th	
2020–21	Biola	10–4	9–2	1st (Southern California Pod)	NCAA Division II Second Round
2021–22	Biola	21–8	14–6	3rd	
2022–23	Biola	18–11	12–8	5th	
2023–24	Biola	17–12	12–8	4th	
2024–25	Biola	22–6	16–4	2nd	
2025–26	Biola	15–13	11–11	T–9th	
Biola:		1,059–417 (.717)			
Total:		1,095–462 (.703)			
National champion Postseason invitational champion Conference regular season champion Conference regular season and conference tournament champion Division regular season champion Division regular season and conference tournament champion Conference tournament champion

== See also ==
- List of college men's basketball career coaching wins leaders
