= 2006 NAIA Division I women's basketball tournament =

- Teams: 32
- Finals site: Oman Arena, Jackson, Tennessee
- Champions: Union University Bulldogs (3rd title, 5th title game, 7th Fab Four)
- Runner-up: Lubbock Christian Chaparrals (1st title game, 1st Fab Four)
- Semifinalists: The Master's Mustangs (1st Fab Four); Vanguard Lions (2nd Fab Four)
- Coach of the year: Mark Campbell (Union (TN))
- Player of the year: Kelly Schmidt (Vanguard)
- Charles Stevenson Hustle Award: Sierra Wilcox (Lubbock Christian)
- Chuck Taylor MVP: Mariam Sy (Oklahoma City)
- Top scorer: Mariam Sy (Oklahoma City) (86 points)

The 2006 NAIA Division I women's basketball tournament was the tournament held by the NAIA to determine the national champion of women's college basketball among its Division I members in the United States and Canada for the 2005–06 basketball season.

Defending champions Union (TN) defeated Lubbock Christian in the championship game, 79–62, to claim the Bulldogs' third NAIA national title.

The tournament was played at the Oman Arena in Jackson, Tennessee.

== Qualification ==
The tournament field remained fixed at thirty-two teams, which were sorted into one of four quadrants and seeded from 1 to 8 within each quadrant.

The tournament continued to utilize a simple single-elimination format.

== Bracket ==
First round
1	Vanguard	91
8	Texas College	46
5	Cumberland (TN)	67
4	Cumberlands (KY)	68
3	Lee (TN)	53
6	Oklahoma Baptist	67
7	William Carey	51
2	Montana Western	67
2	Houston Baptist	60
7	Lindsey Wilson	57
6	Lubbock Christian	69
3	Point Loma Nazarene	54
4	Lewis–Clark State	80
5	Brewton–Parker	63
8	Park (MO)	51
1	Trevecca Nazarene	64
1	Oklahoma City	78
8	Missouri Baptist	46
5	Berry (GA)	62
4	Azusa Pacific	74
3	Carroll (MT)	53
6	Saint Xavier	56
7	John Brown	57
2	Union (TN)	76
2	The Master's	65
7	Auburn Montgomery	50
6	Montana State Northern	82
3	Oklahoma Christian	68
4	Georgetown (KY)	64
5	Mobile	79
8	McKendree	49
1	Freed–Hardeman	66

Second round
1	Vanguard	80
4	Cumberlands (KY)	74
6	Oklahoma Baptist	64
2	Western Montana	53
2	Houston Baptist	56
6	Lubbock Christian	62
4	Lewis–Clark State	54
1	Trevecca Nazarene	70
1	Oklahoma City	92
4	Azusa Pacific	84
6	Saint Xavier	69
2	Union (TN)	92
2	The Master's	67
6	Montana State Northern	62
5	Mobile	56
1	Freed–Hardeman	71

Elite Eight
1	Vanguard	69
6	Oklahoma Baptist	63
6	Lubbock Christian	62
1	Trevecca Nazarene	51
1	Oklahoma City	68
2	Union (TN)	74
2	The Master's	57*
1	Freed–Hardeman	56

Final Four
1	Vanguard	59
6	Lubbock Christian	69
2	Union (TN)	62
2	The Master's	51

National championship
6	Lubbock Christian	62
2	Union (TN)	79

== See also ==
- 2006 NAIA Division I men's basketball tournament
- 2006 NCAA Division I women's basketball tournament
- 2006 NCAA Division II women's basketball tournament
- 2006 NCAA Division III women's basketball tournament
- 2006 NAIA Division II women's basketball tournament
