= 2004 NAIA Division II men's basketball tournament =

- Teams: 32
- Finals site: Keeter Gymnasium; Point Lookout, Missouri
- Champions: Oregon Tech Owls (1st title, 2nd title game, 2nd Fab Four)
- Runner-up: Bellevue Bruins (1st title game, 1st Fab Four)
- Semifinalists: Saint Ambrose Fighting Bees (1st Fab Four); Sioux Falls Cougars (1st Fab Four)
- Charles Stevenson Hustle Award: Brent Heller (Bellevue)
- Chuck Taylor MVP: Kevin Baker (Oregon Tech)
- Top scorer: Karl Peterson (Saint Ambrose) (86 points)

The 2004 NAIA Division II men's basketball tournament was the tournament held by the NAIA to determine the national champion of men's college basketball among its Division II members in the United States and Canada for the 2003–04 basketball season.

Oregon Tech defeated Bellevue (NE) in the championship game, 81–72, to claim the Owls' first NAIA national title.

The tournament was played at Keeter Gymnasium on the campus of the College of the Ozarks in Point Lookout, Missouri.

== Qualification ==
The tournament field remained fixed at thirty-two teams, and the top sixteen teams were seeded.

The tournament continued to utilize a single-elimination format.

== Bracket ==
First round
1	Jamestown	98
Berea	81
Dominican California	69
16	Oregon Tech	71
9	Cornerstone	97
Bluefield (VA)	83
College of the Ozarks	75
8	Cedarville	76
5	Saint Ambrose	63
Sterling (KS)	62
Saint Vincent	113
12	Indiana Tech	96
13	Northwestern (IA)	100
Huntington (IN)	103*
Maine–Machias	75
4	William Jewell	90
3	Albertson	77
Tabor	60
Daemen	74
14	Taylor	67
11	Dickinson State	67
Sioux Falls	85
King (TN)	44
6	Flagler	76
7	Marian (IN)	94
Cal State Hayward	81
Iowa Wesleyan	70
10	MidAmerica Nazarene	84
15	Siena Heights	72
Cardinal Stritch	70
St. Scholastica	55
2	Bellevue (NE)	78

Second round
1	Jamestown	66
16	Oregon Tech	73
9	Cornerstone	77
8	Cedarville	98
5	Saint Ambrose	86
Saint Vincent	80
Huntington (IN)	69
4	William Jewell	74
3	Albertson	71
Daemen	76
Sioux Falls	78
6	Flagler	67
7	Marian (IN)	57
10	MidAmerica Nazarene	69
15	Siena Heights	75
2	Bellevue (NE)	78*

Quarterfinals
16	Oregon Tech	83
8	Cedarville	75
5	Saint Ambrose	88*
4	William Jewell	84
Daemen	62
Sioux Falls	74
10	MidAmerica Nazarene	50
2	Siena Heights	74

Semifinals
16	Oregon Tech	80
5	Saint Ambrose	67
Sioux Falls	62
2	Bellevue	70

National championship
16	Oregon Tech	81
2	Bellevue	72

== See also ==
- 2004 NAIA Division I men's basketball tournament
- 2004 NCAA Division I men's basketball tournament
- 2004 NCAA Division II men's basketball tournament
- 2004 NCAA Division III men's basketball tournament
- 2004 NAIA Division II women's basketball tournament
