= 2006 NAIA Division II men's basketball tournament =

- Teams: 32
- Finals site: Keeter Gymnasium, Point Lookout, Missouri
- Champions: College of the Ozarks Bobcats (1st title, 2nd title game, 2nd Fab Four)
- Runner-up: Huntington Foresters (1st title game, 2nd Fab Four)
- Semifinalists: Lindenwood Lions (1st Fab Four); MidAmerica Nazarene Pioneers (1st Fab Four)
- Charles Stevenson Hustle Award: Doug Sheckler (Huntington (IN))
- Chuck Taylor MVP: Michael Bonaparte (College of the Ozarks)
- Top scorer: Alex Kock (Huntington (IN)) (121 points)

The 2006 NAIA Division II Men’s Basketball national championship was held in March at Keeter Gymnasium in Point Lookout, Missouri. The 15th annual NAIA basketball tournament featured 32 teams playing in a single-elimination format.

== Awards and honors ==
- Leading scorer:
- Leading rebounder:

== Bracket ==
First round	Second round
1	Embry-Riddle (FL) (31-2)	86
--	Sterling (KS) (16-15)	55
1	Embry-Riddle (FL)	78
16	Mt. Vernon Nazarene (OH)	84
--	Iowa Wesleyan (25-7)	81
16	Mt. Vernon Nazarene (OH) (26-8)	87
1st SEED TIER; March 9
9	Taylor (IN) (28-6)	63
--	Aquinas (MI) (22-12)	52
9	Taylor (IN)	71*
8	Lindenwood (MO)	74
--	Dordt (IA) (22-10)	58
8	Lindenwood (MO) (24-9)	66
5	Mayville State (ND) (26-5)	82
--	Daemen (NY) (20-12)	56
5	Mayville State (ND)	99
--	Montreat (NC)	92
--	Montreat (NC) (22-9)	93
12	Sioux Falls (SD) (22-9)	83
4th SEED TIER; March 9
13	William Jewell (MO) (27-7)	67
--	Southern Oregon (23-9)	64*
13	William Jewell (MO)	76
4	College of the Ozarks (MO)	77
--	Dominican (CA) (18-12)	60
4	College of the Ozarks (MO) (25-6)	69
3	Walsh (OH) (26-6)	65
--	Tennessee Wesleyan (20-12)	50
3	Walsh (OH)	81
14	Oregon Tech	66
--	Northwestern (IA) (23-8)	83
14	Oregon Tech (25-8)	92
3rd SEED TIER; March 10
11	Southwestern (KS) (28-4)	60
--	Cardinal Stritch (WI) (25-8)	75
--	Cardinal Stritch (WI)	57
--	MidAmerica Nazarene	66
--	MidAmerica Nazarene (23-10)	72
6	Indiana-Southeast (30-4)	62
7	Warner Pacific (OR) (24-8)	83
--	Holy Names (CA) (23-11)	73
7	Warner Pacific (OR)	68
10	Morningside (IA)	71
--	Cornerstone (MI) (23-11)	74
10	Morningside (IA) (27-6)	87
2nd SEED TIER; March 10
15	Evangel (MO) (24-10)	82
--	Bellevue (NE) (24-8)	74
15	Evangel (MO)	93
2	Huntington (IN)	104
--	Fisher (MA) (15-15)	58
2	Huntington (IN) (29-5)	99

Quarterfinals
16	Mt. Vernon Nazarene (OH)	86
8	Lindenwood (MO)	95
5	Mayville State (ND)	61
4	College of the Ozarks (MO)	80
3	Walsh (OH)	68
--	MidAmerica Nazarene	74
10	Morningside (IA)	70
2	Huntington (IN)	82

Semifinals
8	Lindenwood (MO)	69
4	College of the Ozarks (MO)	88
--	MidAmerica Nazarene	68
2	Huntington (IN)	78

National championship
4	College of the Ozarks (MO)	74
2	Huntington (IN)	56

- * denotes overtime.

== See also ==
- 2006 NAIA Division I men's basketball tournament
- 2006 NCAA Division I men's basketball tournament
- 2006 NCAA Division II men's basketball tournament
- 2006 NCAA Division III men's basketball tournament
- 2006 NAIA Division II women's basketball tournament
