= 2019 NAIA Division II men's basketball tournament =

- Teams: 32
- Finals site: Sanford Pentagon; Sioux Falls, South Dakota
- Champions: Spring Arbor Cougars (1st title, 1st title game, 1st Fab Four)
- Runner-up: Oregon Tech Owls (5th title game, 6th Fab Four)
- Semifinalists: College of Idaho Coyotes (3rd Fab Four); Marian Knights (1st Fab Four)
- Charles Stevenson Hustle Award: Jeff Beckman (Spring Arbor)
- Chuck Taylor MVP: Paul Marandet (Spring Arbor)

The 2019 NAIA Division II Men's Basketball national championship was held in March 2019 at Sanford Pentagon in Sioux Falls, South Dakota. The 28th annual NAIA basketball tournament featured 32 teams playing in a single-elimination format. The championship game was won by Spring Arbor (Mich.) Cougars over the Oregon Tech Hustlin' Owls by a score of 82 to 76.

== 2019 Bracket ==
First Round
1	Oklahoma Wesleyan	70
8	St. Francis (IL)	74
5	Bethel (IN)	81
4	IU East	83*
3	Jamestown	106
6	Southeastern (FL)	85
7	Indiana Tech	50
2	Spring Arbor	85
2	Southwestern (KS)	89
7	Ave Maria	80
6	Madonna	59
3	Marian	83
4	Olivet Nazarene	88
5	Briar Cliff	103
8	College of the Ozarks	79
1	West Virginia Tech	90
1	Indiana Wesleyan	87
8	Washington Adventist	81
5	Warner	65
4	Dakota Wesleyan	79
3	Union (KY)	83
6	IU Kokomo	89
7	Antelope Valley	65
2	Oregon Tech	75
2	College of Idaho	87
7	Voorhees	74
6	Friends (KS)	63
3	Cornerstone	69
4	Mount Vernon Nazarene	76
5	Montreat	63
8	Mayville State	55
1	Morningside	90

Second Round
8	St. Francis (IL)	61
4	IU East	77
3	Jamestown	81
2	Spring Arbor	85
2	Southwestern (KS)	70
3	Marian	82
5	Briar Cliff	99
1	West Virginia Tech	72
1	Indiana Wesleyan	87
4	Dakota Wesleyan	86
6	IU Kokomo	72
2	Oregon Tech	84
2	College of Idaho	86
3	Cornerstone	82
4	Mount Vernon Nazarene	69
1	Morningside	75

Quartfinals
4	IU East	77
2	Spring Arbor	89
3	Marian	105
5	Briar Cliff	66
1	Indiana Wesleyan	93
2	Oregon Tech	107
2	College of Idaho	62
1	Morningside	59

National Semifinals
2	Spring Arbor	66
3	Marian	50
2	Oregon Tech	93
2	College of Idaho	81

National Championship
2	Spring Arbor	82
2	Oregon Tech	76

== See also ==
- 2019 NAIA Division I men's basketball tournament
- 2019 NCAA Division I men's basketball tournament
- 2019 NCAA Division II men's basketball tournament
- 2019 NCAA Division III men's basketball tournament
- 2019 NAIA Division II women's basketball tournament
