= Harry Statham =

American basketball coach (born 1937)

Biographical details
- Born: May 30, 1937 (age 89); Brookport, Illinois, U.S.

Coaching career (HC unless noted)
- 1961–1963: Manito Forman HS
- 1963–1966: Dwight Township HS
- 1966–2018: McKendree

Administrative career (AD unless noted)
- 1966–2010: McKendree

Head coaching record
- Overall: 1,122–513

Harry Statham (born May 30, 1937) is an American former basketball coach. He is a member of the National Association of Intercollegiate Athletics (NAIA) Basketball Hall of Fame. His 1,122 wins during his 52 seasons at McKendree University of Lebanon, Illinois, were the third-most by any men's or women's basketball head coach at a four-year college or university in the United States. This includes any and all levels or divisions of the NCAA and NAIA. The only other coaches at a four-year school with 1,000 or more wins are Pat Summitt, Danny Miles, Mike Krzyzewski, Herb Magee, Tara VanDerveer, Geno Auriemma, Jim Boeheim, and Sylvia Hatchell.

On March 7, 2012, Statham was named as one of the coaches on the NAIA 75th Anniversary All-Star Team.

== Early years ==
Statham was born on May 30, 1937, in Brookport, Illinois. His father, Harry Statham Sr., died of pneumonia and was buried on the day Statham was born. Statham was raised by his mother and his grandfather, Rufus Dye, who encouraged his grandson to get an education and to not smoke or drink.

Statham said of his mother, "[She] wanted me to get a college degree. I was raised so that reputation is so important, the family name, strength, honesty, trustworthiness, respectfulness, ambition."

Statham graduated with a bachelor's degree from McKendree College in 1960. He then enrolled at the University of Illinois, where he served as a graduate assistant for the men's basketball and track teams. He earned a Master of Science degree in physical education from Illinois.

== Family life ==
Statham is married to Rose Statham; they have no children, and live in Belleville, Illinois.

== Coaching career ==
=== Junior high ===
Statham began his coaching career while an undergraduate student at McKendree. He guided the boys' basketball team at O'Fallon Junior High School in Illinois while taking college courses at night.

=== High school ===
From O'Fallon, Statham moved on to coach the varsity boys' basketball team for two seasons at Manito Forman High School (Manito, Illinois). His 1961-62 squad had a 9–16 record and his 1962-63 squad finished 10–13. Statham then moved on to Dwight Township High School (Dwight, Illinois) where he coached for three seasons from 1963 to 1966, posting a cumulative win–loss record of 24–45.

=== McKendree University ===
In his tenure at McKendree, a member of the American Midwest Conference (AMC), Statham has led the Bearcats to post-season play 40 times in 46 seasons. Statham has coached McKendree to all 15 of its NAIA national men's basketball championship tournament berths, including five straight appearances from 1999-2004. Since his first season in 1966-67, Statham's teams have averaged nearly 23 wins per season. His teams have won 20 or more games 35 times. McKendree also ranks among the NAIA's top programs in terms of winning percentage over the past decade.

Statham has had 70 players receive post-season accolades. Ten of those players have earned NAIA All-America honors. Eric Hobbie, the most recent All-American, garnered first-team NAIA Division I All-America honors in 2009-10 after earning second-team recognition in 2008-09. Additionally, Statham has coached three players who were drafted in the professional ranks: Paul Funkhouser, a supplemental pick of the NBA's Chicago Bulls and the Carolina Cougars of the American Basketball Association; Dale Haverman, a fifth-round pick of the Seattle SuperSonics in 1977; and Matt Laur, a fourth round pick of the National Basketball Development League (D-League) draft by the Columbus Riverdragons. Many McKendree athletes who Statham has coached have gone on to successful coaching careers on both the high school and collegiate levels.

About his players, Statham said, "I always recruit the right kinds of players. We do not want thugs that play good basketball. We want them to be good, solid people. We don't want people that are going to flunk out. We want good people, good students and good basketball players—in that order."

Regarding his coaching philosophy, Statham said, "We do things consistently well. Our program is sound. We're very team-oriented, and we've tried to sell that from the very beginning. When you play hard and play together and do things fundamentally sound, you're going to be competitive. Our primary focus is to play hard, play well and try to do it as a team." Statham's on-court demeanor does not include yelling and ref-baiting Said Statham, "I don't like the [television] color commentators (saying) how you gotta work the referee and draw a T. We're trying to play the right way. They're out there saying you've got to bend the rules, step out there a little bit. They turn me off, I really don't enjoy that."

In addition to his coaching duties, from 1966 to May 2010, Statham served as the university's athletic director, and he is an assistant professor of health and human performance.

==== 1987–88 team ====
This Bearcat squad opened the season with 22 straight victories en route to a school-record 35 wins and the university's first-ever NAIA Tournament berth. In the first round of the tournament, McKendree and its opponent Huron College (S.D.), scored a record 231 points, as the Bearcats triumphed 124–107. The combined point total set an NAIA Tournament record that stood until 2006.

==== 1996–97 team ====
Statham led this team to a quarterfinal spot in the NAIA Tournament. The Bearcats defeated two higher-ranked opponents to reach the NAIA Elite Eight, the team's best-ever finish at the national tournament until the success of the 2002–03 team.

==== 2002–03 team ====
McKendree compiled a 34–4 overall record. A 10–0 mark in the AMC marked the first time that the Bearcats went undefeated in the league. At the 2003 NAIA Division I men's basketball tournament, McKendree posted three victories to advance to the NAIA Final Four. The Bearcats lost to eventual national champions Concordia University (California) in the semi-finals. During the season, the Bearcats earned their first No. 1 ranking in the NAIA poll and entered the NAIA national tournament as the No. 2 seed, the highest seed ever for McKendree. The Bearcats also notched three winning streaks of at least 10 games during the season. Matt Laur was recognized as NAIA Player of the Year, the first McKendree athlete to earn the award in Division I. Laur also became the Bearcats’ all-time leading scorer in 2002–03.

==== 2006–07 team ====
McKendree used a late-season surge and runner-up finish in the American Midwest Conference Tournament to earn its first NAIA Division I National Championship bid in three years. Statham guided the Bearcats to an overall record of 23–12 and an 8–4 mark in AMC regular-season play. In the 2007 NAIA Division I men's basketball tournament, the Bearcats topped Mountain State (West Virginia) in the first round and lost and were eliminated in the second round by Faulkner University (Alabama).

==== 2007–08 team ====
Statham entered the 2007–08 season with 938 coaching victories and as the all-time wins leader in men's college basketball history at the four-year level. He, Don Meyer, and Bob Knight were at the time the only men's basketball coaches at senior colleges or universities with 900 coaching wins.

This team finished the season with a 27–7 record. In the 2008 NAIA Division I men's basketball tournament, the Bearcats beat Texas Wesleyan University in the first round and were eliminated in the second round by Campbellsville University.

==== 2008–09 team ====
At the end of the 2009 season, Statham had won 995 games at McKendree, the most by any men's four-year college coach. The Bearcats won the AMC with a perfect 14–0 record in conference play. The 2008–09 Bearcats finished 30–6 on the season and made it to the Elite 8 in the 2009 NAIA Division I men's basketball tournament. They defeated Northwestern Oklahoma State University by a score of 83–58 in the first round, and defeated Texas Wesleyan University by a score of 87–75 in the second round. Then the Bearcats lost to MidAmerica Nazarene University in the Elite 8, by a score of 59–55.

==== Departure and Controversy ====
On Monday, March 5, 2018, after a 12–16 season, Statham was informed by the McKendree Athletic Director that the school was seeking either his retirement or resignation. The next day, the school announced that Statham's time as coach had ended. Soon after, Statham took to social media, posting "The release that came out, from the school, implied I resigned or retired. That was not the case. I am getting phone calls and email from friends who thought I retired," and continued, "I said I did not want to retire and didn't want to retire. I said I wasn't a quitter, wanted to leave on a winning note or a winning season."

== Milestones ==
1. On November 15, 2002, Statham guided the Bearcats to an 88–87 victory against Mountain State, making him the NAIA's all-time leader in career victories with career win No. 817.
2. On December 1, 2004, Statham led McKendree to an 83–72 victory over Maryville University, marking his 880th career win, pushing Statham past North Carolina head coach Dean Smith for the all-time wins record among college basketball coaches.
3. On November 25, 2005, Statham reached the 900-win mark as the Bearcats defeated Freed-Hardeman University, 73–69.
4. On January 12, 2008, Statham reached the 950-win mark as the Bearcats defeated Williams Baptist College, 98–73.
5. On December 9, 2008, Statham won his 975th game, defeating Olivet Nazarene University 78–75 in overtime, and coached his 1,354th game, tying with former Mount St. Mary's coach Jim Phelan for the most games coached.
6. On December 16, 2008, Statham won his 976th game, defeating Concordia Seminary and coached his 1,355 game surpassing former Mt. St. Mary coach Jim Phelan for the most games coached.
7. On November 13, 2009, Statham collected his 1,000th win in McKendree's 79–49 win over East-West.
8. On January 28, 2016, Statham and the Bearcats posted a 92–85 triumph over the No. 21 Wisconsin-Parkside to collect win No. 1,098, which tied him with former University of Tennessee women's basketball coach Pat Summitt for the all-time wins record of any collegiate coach at the four-year level.

== Honors ==
Statham has been named the NAIA-Illinois Basketball Coaches Association (IBCA) Men's Basketball Coach of the Year twelve times and in 1987 he was inducted into the IBCA-NAIA Hall of Fame. In 1998, Statham's career accomplishments and achievements were recognized with his induction into the NAIA Hall of Fame. Statham has received the American Midwest Conference Coach of the Year award eight different times, and he was a six-time recipient of the NAIA District 20 Coach of the Year.

He was selected as the 2001-02 NAIA Men's Basketball Coach of the Year.

In 2005, Statham was recognized at the National Association of Basketball Coaches (NABC) national convention in St. Louis with the Guardians of the Game Leadership Award, an honor bestowed by his peers. That same summer, the United States Sports Academy presented him with its Distinguished Service Award, awarded annually, "... to individuals who have made outstanding contributions to national or international sports through education, research or service."

In 2006, the Lebanon City Council honored Statham by renaming a roadway on the McKendree campus, Harry Statham Way. The university's gymnasium, the Harry M. Statham Sports Center (capacity 1500), is also named for him.

== See also ==
- List of college men's basketball career coaching wins leaders

== Notes ==
- Cherner, Reid. "College Hoops’ Biggest Winner". USA Today. 27 Dec. 2005. 11 July 2008. https://www.usatoday.com/sports/college/mensbasketball/2005-12-26-statham-record_x.htm
- Cummings, Scott. "STATHAM BREAKS NAIA WIN RECORD AT 817 AS MEN'S BASKETBALL HOLDS OFF MOUNTAIN STATE, 88–87". Bearcat Sports Report. 15 Nov 2002. 12 July 2008.
- Cummings, Scott. "HARRY STATHAM BECOMES COLLEGE BASKETBALL'S ALL-TIME WINS LEADER AS McKENDREE DEFEATS MARYVILLE, 83–72". Bearcat Sports Report. 1 Dec 2004. 12 July 2008. http://original.mckendree.edu/sports/2004-05/04-05%20news/december_04/12_1_mbbmaryville.htm
- Dodd, Dennis. "Unknown to most, NAIA coach Statham on cusp of major record". CBS Sportsline. 26 Nov 2004. 11 July 2008.
- Ellsworth, Tim. "When character trumps talent". Baptist Press Sports. 2 Dec 2004. 12 July 2008. http://www.sbcbaptistpress.org/BPnews.asp?ID=19655
- "Head Coach Harry Statham". McKendree University Athletics. 11 July 208. https://web.archive.org/web/20070927000045/http://athletics.mckendree.edu/roster.asp?playerid=549&sport=5
