= 2006 NCAA Division III women's basketball tournament =

- Teams: 63
- Finals site: Blake Arena, Springfield, Massachusetts
- Champions: Hope Flying Dutch (2nd title)
- Runner-up: Southern Maine Huskies (3rd title game)
- Third place: Scranton Royals (8th Final Four)
- Fourth place: Hardin-Simmons Cowboys (1st Final Four)
- Winning coach: Brian Morehouse (1st title)
- MOP: Bria Ebels (Hope)
- Attendance: 21,221

The 2006 NCAA Division III women's basketball tournament was the 25th annual tournament hosted by the NCAA to determine the national champion of Division III women's collegiate basketball in the United States.

Hope defeated Southern Maine in the championship game, 69–56, to claim the Flying Dutchmen's second Division III national title and first since 1990.

The championship rounds were hosted by Springfield College at Blake Arena in Springfield, Massachusetts.

== Bracket ==
=== Top left sectional ===
First round March 3, 2006; Regional sites
Mary Washington*	79
TCNJ	41
Fredericksburg, VA
Muhlenberg	57
Wesleyan (CT)	55
Bowdoin	73
Colby-Sawyer	54
Brunswick, ME
Brandeis	63
Salem State	59
Southern Maine	81
Maine Maritime	41
Gorham, ME
Maine–Farmington	63
Norwich	76
Mount Saint Mary	64
Baruch	66
Newburgh, NY
Bates	69
Bridgewater (VA)	71*

Second round March 4, 2006; Regional sites
Mary Washington	68
Muhlenberg	48
Bowdoin	59
Brandeis	56
Southern Maine	72
Norwich	42
Baruch	49
Bridgewater (VA)	72

Sectional semifinals March 10, 2006; Gorham, ME
Mary Washington	54
Bowdoin	62
Southern Maine	68
Bridgewater (VA)	55

Sectional finals March 11, 2006; Gorham, ME
Bowdoin	53
Southern Maine	56

=== Bottom left sectional ===
First round March 3, 2006; Regional sites
Randolph-Macon	83
Hood	57
Ashland, VA
Moravian	80
Greensboro	93
Simpson	73
Saint Benedict	70
Indianola, IA
Concordia Moorhead	37
Wisconsin–Stout	61
Pacific Lutheran	72
Chapman	54
Tacoma, WA
Puget Sound	74
Cal Lutheran	62
McMurry	53
Hardin-Simmons	64
Abilene, TX
Howard Payne	71
Trinity (TX)	53

Second round March 4, 2006; Regional sites
Randolph-Macon	79
Greensboro	61
Simpson	68
Wisconsin–Stout	78
Pacific Lutheran	62
Puget Sound	50
Hardin-Simmons	73
Howard Payne	64

Sectional semifinals March 10, 2006; Tacoma, WA
Randolph-Macon	80
Wisconsin–Stout	71
Pacific Lutheran	72
Hardin-Simmons	76

Sectional finals March 11, 2006; Tacoma, WA
Randolph-Macon	56
Hardin-Simmons	72

=== Top right sectional ===
First round March 3, 2006; Regional sites
Baldwin-Wallace	73
Oswego State	69
Berea, OH
St. John Fisher	62
William Smith	69
Messiah	70
Springfield	56
Grantham, PA
Williams	63
NYU	56
Scranton	78
Marymount (VA)	55
Scranton, PA
Gwynedd-Mercy	72
Richard Stockton	68
Rochester	83
Cortland State	65
Rochester, NY
Medaille	73
Washington & Jefferson	55

Second round March 4, 2006; Regional sites
Baldwin-Wallace	71
William Smith	65
Messiah	67
Williams	71
Scranton	80
Gwynedd-Mercy	72
Rochester	57
Medaille	54

Sectional semifinals March 10, 2006; Scranton, PA
Baldwin-Wallace	71
Williams	65
Scranton	66
Rochester	63

Sectional finals March 11, 2006; Scranton, PA
Baldwin-Wallace	41
Scranton	50

=== Bottom right sectional ===
First round March 3, 2006; Regional sites
Brookhaven, GA/Greencastle, IN
Maryville (TN)	93
Oglethorpe*	61
Wheaton (IL)	66
Rockford	50
Wheaton, IL
Lakeland	41
Maryville (MO)	48
Washington St. Louis	70
Manchester	54
St. Louis, MO
Carroll (WI)	64
Calvin	57
Hope	72
Denison	51
Bexley, OH
Franklin	54
Capital	61

Second round March 4, 2006; Regional sites
DePauw	86
Maryville (TN)	58
Wheaton (IL)	75
Maryville (MO)	48
Washington St. Louis	78
Carroll (WI)	66
Hope	75
Capital	56

Sectional semifinals March 10, 2006; Greencastle, IN
DePauw	69
Wheaton (IL)	60
Washington St. Louis	89
Hope	92

Sectional finals March 11, 2006; Greencastle, IN
DePauw	60
Hope	76

=== Final Four ===
Final Four; March 17, 2006; Springfield, MA
Southern Maine	74
Hardin-Simmons	65
Scranton	56
Hope	59

National championship March 18, 2006; Springfield, MA
Southern Maine	56
Hope	69
Third place
Hardin-Simmons	47
Scranton	57

== All-tournament team ==
- Bria Ebels, Hope
- Julie Henderson, Hope
- Ashley Marble, Southern Maine
- Megan Myles, Southern Maine
- Taryn Mellody, Scranton

== See also ==
- 2006 NCAA Division I women's basketball tournament
- 2006 NCAA Division II women's basketball tournament
- 2006 NAIA Division I women's basketball tournament
- 2006 NAIA Division II women's basketball tournament
- 2006 NCAA Division III men's basketball tournament
