= St. Joseph Convent and Academy =

- U.S. National Register of Historic Places
- Location within Oklahoma Location within the United States
- Location: Due south of current-day Oklahoma SH-33, Guthrie, Oklahoma
- Coordinates: 35°52′16.9″N 97°27′39.5″W
- Area: 1 acre (0.40 ha)
- Built: 1892, expanded 1905
- Built by: J.T. Brickmap
- Architect: Joseph Foucart
- Architectural style: Second Empire
- Demolished: 1995
- NRHP reference No.: 79002000
- Added to NRHP: December 19, 1979

The St. Joseph Convent and Academy was a historic Roman Catholic church convent and school located off of State Highway 33 in Guthrie, Oklahoma, United States. It was added to the National Register in 1979.

The Second Empire-style building was completed in 1892, with a northern expansion being built in 1905. Starting in 1897, it housed the Benedictine Sisters and the St. Joseph Academy, a boarding school for girls operated by the Sisters. St. Joseph Academy was believed to be the first school of its kind in the then-established Oklahoma Territory.

As Oklahoma became a state in 1907, the school grew larger in pupils and sensed a need for higher education. In 1917, the school started a four-year college curriculum and changed its name to Oklahoma Catholic College for Women, achieving another first by becoming the fledgling state's only Catholic college. The school remained open to women of all ages and grades until 1949, when the school once again changed its name to Benedictine Heights College, and began a student-by-day program for men.

In 1965, the Sisters and school moved to Tulsa, Oklahoma, forming what would later become St. Joseph Monastery, and sold the original convent and academy property to the City of Guthrie for US$150,000 (equivalent to US$1,532,471 in 2025). As of July 2024, the property and surrounding areas have continued ownership by the City of Guthrie, with the Job Corps building and opening a Guthrie center in 1966, while also utilizing the old St. Joseph facilities until their demolition in 1995.
