= 2006 NAIA Division I men's basketball tournament =

College basketball tournament

- 2006 NAIA Men's Division I National Basketball Tournament
- Teams: 32
- Finals site: Municipal Auditorium; Kansas City, Missouri
- Champions: Texas Wesleyan (1st title)
- Runner-up: Oklahoma City (5th title game)
- Semifinalists: Oklahoma Baptist (8th Final Four); Robert Morris (IL) (2nd Final Four)
- Coach of the year: Terry Waldrop (Texas Wesleyan)
- Player of the year: Brandon Cole (John Brown)
- Charles Stevenson Hustle Award: Trevor Meier (Oklahoma City)
- Chuck Taylor MVP: Evan Patterson (Texas Wesleyan)
- Top scorer: Willie Irick (Oklahoma City) (85 points)

The 2006 Buffalo Funds - NAIA Men's Division I Basketball Tournament was held from March 15 to 21 at Municipal Auditorium in Kansas City, Missouri. This was the 69th annual NAIA Division I basketball tournament and featured 32 teams playing in a single-elimination format.

The unranked Texas Wesleyan University Rams defeated the Oklahoma City University Stars by a score of 67 to 65. 2006 marked the second year in a row an unranked team won the National Championship. Undeterred by this loss, the Stars went on to win the next two National Championship titles. The other teams that made it to the NAIA National Semifinals were Oklahoma Baptist University and Robert Morris (IL).

== Awards and honors ==
- Leading scorer: Willie Irick, Oklahoma City; in 5 games Irick scored a total of 85 points, including 31 field goals and 17 free throws averaging 17.0 points per game.
- Leading rebounder: Freeman Taylor, Robert Morris (IL); in 4 games Taylor earned 61 rebounds averaging 15.25 per game
- Most consecutive tournament appearances: 15th, Georgetown (KY)
- Most tournament appearances: Georgetown (KY), 25th of 30, appearances to the NAIA Tournament.

== Bracket ==
First Round; March 15 and 16	Second Round; March 17
1	Mountain State	84
–	Southwestern Assemblies of God	64
1	Mountain State	65
–	Olivet Nazarene	79
–	Olivet Nazarene	84
16	Wayland Baptist	77
TOP TIER; March 15
9	Georgetown (KY)	83
–	Vanguard	80
9	Georgetown (KY)	71
8	Oklahoma Baptist	80
–	Illinois–Springfield	70
8	Oklahoma Baptist	86
5	Union (TN)	64
-	Texas Wesleyan	82
–	Texas Wesleyan	67
–	Oklahoma Christian	62
–	Oklahoma Christian	77
12	Lee	70
TOP TIER; March 15
13	Campbellsville	70
–	Mobile	54
13	Campbellsville	74
4	Carroll (MT)	78
–	St. Xavier	40
4	Carroll (MT)	68
3	Robert Morris (IL)	88
–	Southern Wesleyan	80
3	Robert Morris (IL)	87
–	Spring Hill	71
–	Spring Hill	82
14	Voorhees	67
BOTTOM TIER; March 16
11	Trevecca Nazarene	82
–	Lambuth	67
–	Trevecca Nazarene	75
–	Azusa Pacific	78
–	John Brown	63
6	Azusa Pacific	65
7	Oklahoma City	91
–	Columbia (MO)	64
7	Oklahoma City	99
10	Houston Baptist	77
–	Westminster (UT)	64
10	Houston Baptist	73
BOTTOM TIER; March 16
15	San Diego Christian	72
–	Lindsey Wilson	83
–	Lindsey Wilson	85
–	Southern Poly	73
–	Southern Poly	104
2	LSU–Shreveport	90

Elite Eight; March 18
–	Olivet Nazarene	75
8	Oklahoma Baptist	91
–	Texas Wesleyan	73
4	Carroll (MT)	70
3	Robert Morris (IL)	94
-	Azusa Pacific	91
7	Oklahoma City	77
-	Lindsey Wilson	67

NAIA National Semifinals; March 20
8	Oklahoma Baptist	72
-	Texas Wesleyan	83
3	Robert Morris (IL)	92
7	Oklahoma City	94

NAIA National Championship; March 21
-	Texas Wesleyan	67
7	Oklahoma City	65

== See also ==
- 2006 NAIA Division I women's basketball tournament
- 2006 NCAA Division I men's basketball tournament
- 2006 NCAA Division II men's basketball tournament
- 2006 NCAA Division III men's basketball tournament
- 2006 NAIA Division II men's basketball tournament
