= List of NCCAA men's basketball champions =

The following is a list of National Christian College Athletic Association men's basketball champions.

Season	Division I	Division II	Division IIA
1968	Lee College (TN)		
1969	Azusa Pacific University		
1970	Azusa Pacific University		
1971	Azusa Pacific University		
1972	Azusa Pacific University		
1973	Lee College (TN)		
1974	Bethany Nazarene College		
1975	Olivet Nazarene College		
1976	Biola University	Ft. Wayne Bible College	
1977	Bethany Nazarene College	Western Baptist College	
1978	Biola University	Baptist Bible College (MO)	
1979	Tennessee Temple University	Baptist Bible College (PA)	
1980	Liberty Baptist College	Northwestern College (MN)	
1981	Tennessee Temple University	Baptist Bible College (MO)	
1982	Tennessee Temple University	Baptist Bible College (MO)	
1983	Tennessee Temple University	Baptist Bible College (MO)	
1984	Biola University	Baptist Bible College (MO)	
1985	Point Loma Nazarene University	Cincinnati Bible College	
1986	Point Loma Nazarene University	Cincinnati Bible College	
1987	Point Loma Nazarene University	Cincinnati Bible College	
1988	Tennessee Temple University	Kentucky Christian College	
1989	Tennessee Temple University	Kentucky Christian College	
1990	Christian Heritage College	Maranatha Baptist Bible College	
1991	John Brown University	Kentucky Christian College	Miami Christian College
1992	Bethel College	Baptist Bible College (PA)	Latin American Bible College
1993	Bethel College	Northwestern College (MN)	Atlanta Christian College
1994	Lee College (TN)	Central Bible College	Grace Bible College
1995	Indiana Wesleyan University	Kentucky Christian College	Grace Bible College
1996	Malone College	Kentucky Christian College	Manhattan Christian College
1997	Christian Heritage College	Kentucky Christian College	Southwestern College (AZ)
1998	Christian Heritage College	Mid-America Bible College	Southwestern College (AZ)
1999	Oakland City University	Kentucky Christian College	Hillsdale Free Will Baptist College
2000	Bethel College	Atlanta Christian College	Southwestern College of Christian Ministries
2001	Gardner–Webb University	Central Bible College	Southwestern College of Christian Ministries
2002	Mount Vernon Nazarene University	Central Bible College	Hillsdale Free Will Baptist College
2003	Tennessee Temple University	Mid-America Bible College	Southwestern Christian University
2004	Christian Heritage College	Mid-America Christian University	
2005	Spring Arbor University	Southeastern University	
2006	Spring Arbor University	Grace Bible College	
2007	Bethel College	Mid-America Christian University	
2008	Indiana Wesleyan University	Grace University	
2009	Emmanuel College (GA)	Grace Bible College	
2010	Northwestern College (MN)	Grace Bible College	
2011	Dallas Baptist University	Grace Bible College	
2012	Cedarville University	Grace Bible College	
2013	Shorter University	Ohio Christian University	
2014	Point Loma Nazarene	Ohio Christian University	
2015	Colorado Christian	Lancaster Bible	
2016	Emmanuel College (GA)	Hillsdale Free Will Baptist College	
2017	Colorado Christian	Randall University (fmr. Hillsdale Free Will)	
2018	Emmanuel College (GA)	Randall University	
2019	Cedarville University	Grace Christian University (fmr. Grace Bible)	
2020	No championships held – COVID-19 pandemic		
2021	University of Northwestern – St. Paul	Johnson University	
2022	Baptist Bible College	Campbellsville University Harrodsburg	
2023	Bethel University (Indiana)	Kansas Christian College (Overland Park)	
2024	Cedarville University	Crown College (MN)	
2025	Nelson American Indian College	North Central University	
