= 2006 NCAA Division III men's basketball tournament =

American collegiate men's basketball tournament (2006)

- Teams: 59
- Finals site: , Salem, Virginia
- Champions: Virginia Wesleyan (1st title)
- Runner-up: Wittenberg (4th title game)
- Semifinalists: Illinois Wesleyan (4th Final Four); Amherst (2nd Final Four)
- Winning coach: David Macedo (VWC)
- MOP: Ton Ton Balenga (VWC)
- Attendance: 45,371

The 2006 NCAA Division III men's basketball tournament was the 32nd annual single-elimination tournament to determine the national champions of National Collegiate Athletic Association (NCAA) men's Division III collegiate basketball in the United States.

The field contained sixty-four teams, and each program was allocated to one of four sectionals. All sectional games were played on campus sites, while the national semifinals, third-place final, and championship finals were contested at the Salem Civic Center in Salem, Virginia.

Virginia Wesleyan defeated Wittenberg, 59–56, in the championship, clinching their first national title.

The Marlins (30–3) were coached by David Macedo.

Ton Ton Balenga, also from Virginia Wesleyan, was named Most Outstanding Player.

== Bracket ==
=== Top left sectional ===
First round
St. Thomas (MN)	76
North Central (IL)	68
UW–Whitewater	76
DePauw	68
Carroll (WI)	68
Illinois Wesleyan	81
Occidental	48
Claremont–Mudd–Scripps	41
Augustana (IL)	71
Buena Vista	66
UW–Stout	66
Carleton	64

Second round
Lawrence	63
St. Thomas (MN)	59
UW–Whitewater	71
Illinois Wesleyan	85
Puget Sound	89
Occidental	81
Augustana (IL)	77
UW–Stout	70

Sectional semifinals
Lawrence	68
Illinois Wesleyan	71
Puget Sound	92
Augustana (IL)	86

Sectional finals
Illinois Wesleyan	113
Puget Sound	99

=== Bottom left sectional ===
First round
Ursinus	82
Farmingdale State	93
Lincoln (PA)	102
Christopher Newport	96
Alvernia	77
Messiah	83*
Baruch	71
Villa Julie	86
Scranton	45
William Paterson	70
York (PA)	87
York (NY)	67
Catholic	59
Widener	61

Second round
Virginia Wesleyan	71
Farmingdale State	63
Lincoln (PA)	100
Messiah	80
Villa Julie	48
William Paterson	72
York (PA)	69
Widener	71

Sectional semifinals
Virginia Wesleyan	72
Lincoln (PA)	71
William Paterson	52
Widener	45

Sectional finals
Virginia Wesleyan	46
William Paterson	35

=== Top right sectional ===
First round
Hamilton	66*
Plattsburgh State	65
Cortland State	68
UMass Boston	54
Tufts	83
Endicott	60
WPI	79
Bridgewater State	62
Gordon	66
Utica	71
Norwich	82
Elms	70

Second round
Amherst	83
Hamilton	59
Cortland State	65
Tufts	68
WPI	58
Utica	76
Norwich	50
St. John Fisher	71

Sectional semifinals
Amherst	90*
Tufts	85
Utica	78
St. John Fisher	94

Sectional finals
Amherst	93
St. John Fisher	70

=== Bottom right sectional ===
First round
Mississippi College	88
Maryville (MO)	58
Trinity (TX)	64
Maryville (TN)	83
Transylvania	75
Bethany (WV)	56
Wooster	84
Randolph–Macon	70
Hope	93
Wisconsin Lutheran	51
Calvin	79
UW–La Crosse	71
Wittenberg	76
Lake Erie	40
Carnegie Mellon	71
Baldwin Wallace	79

Second round
Mississippi College	69
Maryville (TN)	51
Transylvania	91
Wooster	88
Hope	70
Calvin	67
Wittenberg	78
Baldwin Wallace	60

Sectional semifinals
Mississippi College	64
Transylvania	76
Hope	49
Wittenberg	56

Sectional finals
Transylvania	61
Wittenberg	74

== Final Four ==
- Site: Salem Civic Center, Salem, Virginia

National Semifinals
Illinois Wesleyan	79
Virginia Wesleyan	81
Amherst	60
Wittenberg	64

National Championship
Virginia Wesleyan	59
Wittenberg	56
National Third-place
Illinois Wesleyan	71
Amherst	68

== See also ==
- 2006 NCAA Division I men's basketball tournament
- 2006 NCAA Division II men's basketball tournament
- 2006 NCAA Division III women's basketball tournament
- 2006 NAIA Division I men's basketball tournament
