= Buckmaster =

Buckmaster is an English surname, and may refer to:

- Adrian Buckmaster, 4th Viscount Buckmaster (born 1949), British businessman
- Briana Buckmaster (born 1982), Canadian actress and singer
- Charles Buckmaster (1951–1972), Australian poet
- Elliott Buckmaster (1889–1976), American vice admiral, captain of the aircraft carrier Yorktown at the battles of Coral Sea and Midway
- Ernest Buckmaster (1897–1968), Australian painter
- Henrietta Buckmaster, pen name of American activist, journalist and author Henrietta Henkle (1909–1983)
- Herbert J. Buckmaster (1881–1966), English soldier and first husband of actress Gladys Cooper
- Jim Buckmaster (born 1962), American CEO of Craigslist
- John C. Buckmaster (1914–1995), English actor, father of Paul Buckmaster
- John D. Buckmaster (born 1941), American physicist
- John R. Buckmaster (1915–1983), English actor, son of Gladys Cooper
- L. S. Buckmaster (1894–1967), American trade unionist
- Martin Stanley Buckmaster, 3rd Viscount Buckmaster (1921–2007), British diplomat
- Maurice Buckmaster (1902–1992), British leader of the French SOE
- Nathaniel Buckmaster (1787–1855), American builder, military officer, sheriff, prison operator and politician, uncle of Samuel Buckmaster
- Paul Buckmaster (1946–2017), English musician/composer
- Rece Buckmaster (born 1996), American soccer player
- Samuel Buckmaster (c. 1817–1878), American prison warden and politician
- Simon Buckmaster (born 1961), British former Grand Prix motorcycle racer
- Stanley Buckmaster, 1st Viscount Buckmaster (1861–1934), British politician
- Walter Buckmaster (1872–1942), British polo player
- William Buckmaster (died 1545), English cleric and academic, three times vice-chancellor of the University of Cambridge
