= Buckmaster (disambiguation) =

Buckmaster is a surname. It may also refer to:

- Viscount Buckmaster, a title in the Peerage of the United Kingdom
- Bristol Buckmaster, a 1950s Royal Air Force training aircraft
- 20084 Buckmaster, an asteroid
- Buckmaster Pond, Westwood, Massachusetts, United States

== See also ==
- Buckmaster & Moore, a former London stockbroker
