= AdVantage News =

American newspaper in Illinois

- Owner: John Simmons
- Founder(s): Sharon McRoy, Jim Siebold
- Publisher: Eric McRoy
- Editor-in-chief: Fred Pollard
- Launched: 1986 (Today's AdVantage) 2013 (AdVantage News)
- Headquarters: Alton, Illinois
- Country: United States
- Circulation: 77,700 (as of 2016)
- Website: advantagenews.com
- Free online archives: yes

AdVantage News is a daily (online) and weekly (print) hyper-local American newspaper, published in Alton, Illinois, and serving the Metro East region of Illinois. Established as a pennysaver in 1986, the publication transitioned into a newspaper in February 2014.

In 1986, Jim Seibold and Sharon McRoy formed Today's AdVantage, a pennysaver that was mailed to 42,000 households in the Riverbend area.

In 2013, Alton-based lawyer and owner of Alton Steel John Simmons purchased Today's AdVantage from Seibold and McRoy with the intention of turning it into a newspaper.

On Feb. 1, 2014, Today's AdVantage became AdVantage News.
