= Lucas Pfeiffenberger =

American architect

Lucas Pfeiffenberger was an architect. He won an award at the World’s Columbian Exposition in 1893 for his design of Garfield School in Alton, Illinois.

== Early years ==
Pfeiffenberger was born in Dayton, Ohio on November 14, 1834 to German immigrants. His parents, John and Elizabeth (Miller) Pfeiffenberger, were natives of Baden-Baden, in southwestern Germany. After settling in America, his father became a farmer. Pfeiffenberger received his early education in Ohio where he honed his engineering, construction, and architecture. Shortly after the gold discoveries in California, Pfeiffenberger headed West to pursue his chance of prosperity. After returning to the Midwest, he stopped for a short stay in Alton, IL to visit a friend and former parish priest. Finding Alton’s views, buildings, and history fascinating Pfeiffenberger became a permanent resident of Alton in 1857.

== Career ==
Pfeiffenberger began in a partnership with Henry Armstrong (Armstrong and Pfeiffenberger), 1858-1870. Then he was a partner in the firm of Pfeiffenberger and Hugo from 1870 on. Thereafter he formed a firm with two of his sons called, L. Pfeiffenberger and Sons. The Missouri History Museum holds a collection which includes six volumes of records of Armstrong and Pfeiffenberger, architects and contractors, 1858-1870, A daybook of Pfeiffenberger and Hugo, architects and contractors, 1970-1872, an index to architectural drawings, circa 1902-1923, and a letterbook, 1900-1907, of L. Pfeiffenberger and Sons, circa 1902-1923.

== Family ==
Pfeiffenberger married Miss Elizabeth C. Mather, in 1867 and had five sons. The two oldest sons died of tuberculosis – one as a teenager and one in his early twenties. The surviving boys were J. Mather, George D. and John M. Two sons, George and John later joined their father at the architectural firm, Lucas Pfeiffenberger and Sons.

== Projects ==
His work includes numerous commercial buildings, private homes, churches, schools and hospitals. Pfeiffenberger’s preference in architectural style are numerous including Italianate, Queen Anne, Georgian Revival, and other designs are found throughout Alton in the form of magnificent mansions and other public buildings. Many of his structures like the Western Military Academy, Lucy Haskell Playhouse, the McPike Mansion, and The Beall Mansion (originally the Job Drummond Mansion) located in the Middletown Historic District are listed on or are supporting structures in historic districts of the National Register of Historic Places

In 2015, the Lucy Haskell Playhouse underwent a major exterior renovation. One hundred and thirty years after its construction, the playhouse began deteriorating. According to the Haskell Association "The house had lead paint on its exterior, which was in poor condition, and had to be removed before the playhouse was repainted. The playhouse also needed exterior carpentry work, including on the soffit, fascia and porch floors before painting could begin." The association was successful in raising enough money to complete the renovations to restore the playhouse.

Some of his buildings have been razed. Two of his designs, the McPike Mansion and the Captain Leyhe House, are reportedly haunted, and are featured stops on the Alton Hauntings and Alton’s Haunted Odyssey tours. Most recently on Wednesday, May 20, 2015 the Watson House, built in 1879, caught on fire. According to the St. Louis Post-Dispatch, "The blaze completely consumed the kitchen floor, sending the refrigerator, dishwasher, microwave and cabinets tumbling into the basement."

== Civic service ==
A resident of Alton since 1857, Pfeiffenberger was a figure in the business and financial affairs of the city. His leadership and community service contributions span years. He held many positions of importance in Alton. In 1866 Pfeiffenberger became chief of the Volunteer Alton fire department. In 1872 he was elected mayor of Alton, and served four terms. He was originator and became president of the Building and Loan Association in Alton in 1883. Furthermore, Pfeiffenberger was one of the organizers and chairman of the board of directors of Citizens National Bank.

== Death and legacy ==
Pfeiffenberger died in 1918, at the age of 83. According to his obituary, he death was an "indirect result of an accidental fall in which he broke two ribs...and suffered from internal injuries" A few days later he rose to visit the bathroom and "fell over into the empty bathtub." His death was instant and his son Dr. Mather Pfeiffenberger believed the death was due to "an embolism of the brain where a clot had formed." He was buried in the Alton City Cemetery.
