= College of the Ozarks =

Private college in Point Lookout, Missouri, US

- Type: Private college
- Established: 1906; 120 years ago
- Religious affiliation: Nondenominational Christianity
- Academic affiliations: APCU; CIC; WCC
- Endowment: $703.7 million (2025)
- President: Brad Johnson
- Students: 1,508
- Location: Point Lookout, Missouri, United States; 36.6181°N 93.2405°W
- Campus: Rural, 1,000-acre (1.6 sq mi; 404.7 ha)
- Nicknames: Bobcats and Lady Cats
- Sporting affiliations: NAIA – Continental; NCCAA – Independent
- Website: cofo.edu

College of the Ozarks is a private Christian college in Point Lookout, Missouri, United States. The college has an enrollment of 1,426 and over 30 academic majors in Bachelor of Arts and Bachelor of Science programs.

The college charges no tuition for full-time students due to its student work program and donations. The program requires students to work 15 hours a week at an on-campus work station and two 40-hour work weeks during breaks. A summer work program is available to some students to cover room and board costs. The college refers to itself as "Hard Work U" and places emphasis on character education.

== History ==
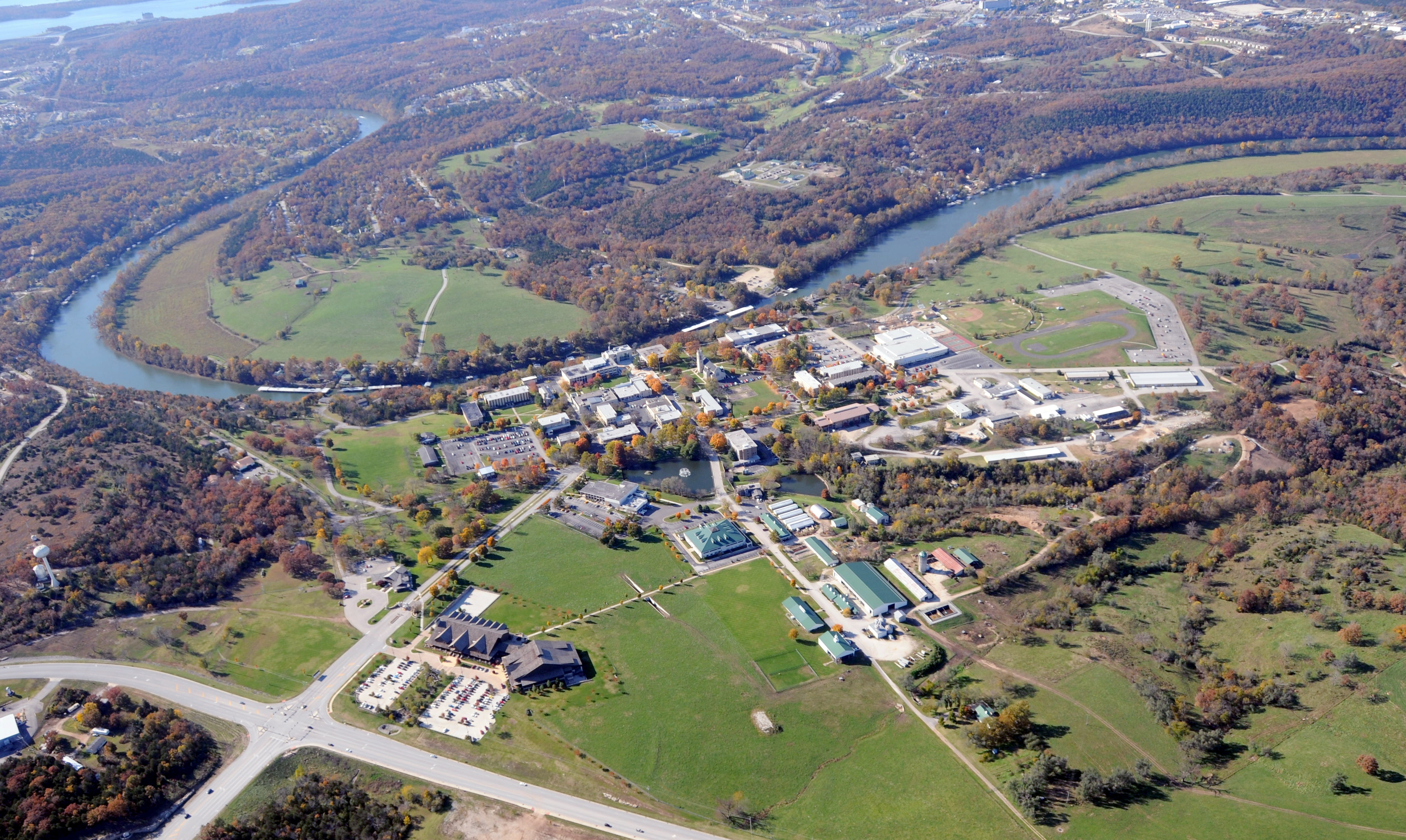
Aerial photo of college of the Ozarks with Lake Taneycomo, Branson, and Table Rock Lake beyond

=== Forsyth ===
The school was first proposed in 1901 as a high school by James Forsythe, pastor of the Presbyterian Church in Forsyth, Missouri. (The college now declares itself to be interdenominational.) Forsythe was from the St. Louis, Missouri area.

Forsythe was said to have been inspired to make the proposal after encountering a boy on a squirrel hunt who told him that his parents could not afford to send him to the closest high school 40 miles (60 km) away in Springfield, Missouri.

The School of the Ozarks opened on September 11, 1906, in a 75-by-50-foot (23-by-15-meter) building atop Mount Huggins (named for brothers Louis and William Huggins from St. Joseph, Missouri who were among the founders of Nabisco and had donated money for the school). In its first term it had enrollment of 180 with 36 boarders.

From the start, the school adopted its practice of having its students work instead of paying tuition.

On January 12, 1915, the original building was destroyed in a fire. The school temporarily held classes in the Forsyth public school.

=== Point Lookout ===
The school then relocated farther up the White River at Point Lookout, Missouri on a 16-acre (6.47 ha) campus. The campus has changed quite a bit since this era, but has remained at the Point Lookout location ever since. The central building of the campus was the Maine Hunting and Fishing Club building, which had been transported to the site by sportsmen from the 1904 St. Louis World's Fair where it had been the State of Maine exhibit. It was renamed the Dobyns Building in honor of W. R. Dobyns, president of the trustees at the time. The building burned on February 1, 1930.

In the 1920s what would become the Ralph Foster Museum depicting Ozark heritage had its start in the basement of the boys dormitory: Abernathy Hall.

In 1934 the Fruitcake and Jelly Kitchen opened to offer work for students. It is now one of 90 work stations. More than 100 fruitcakes are now baked daily.

=== 1950s expansion ===
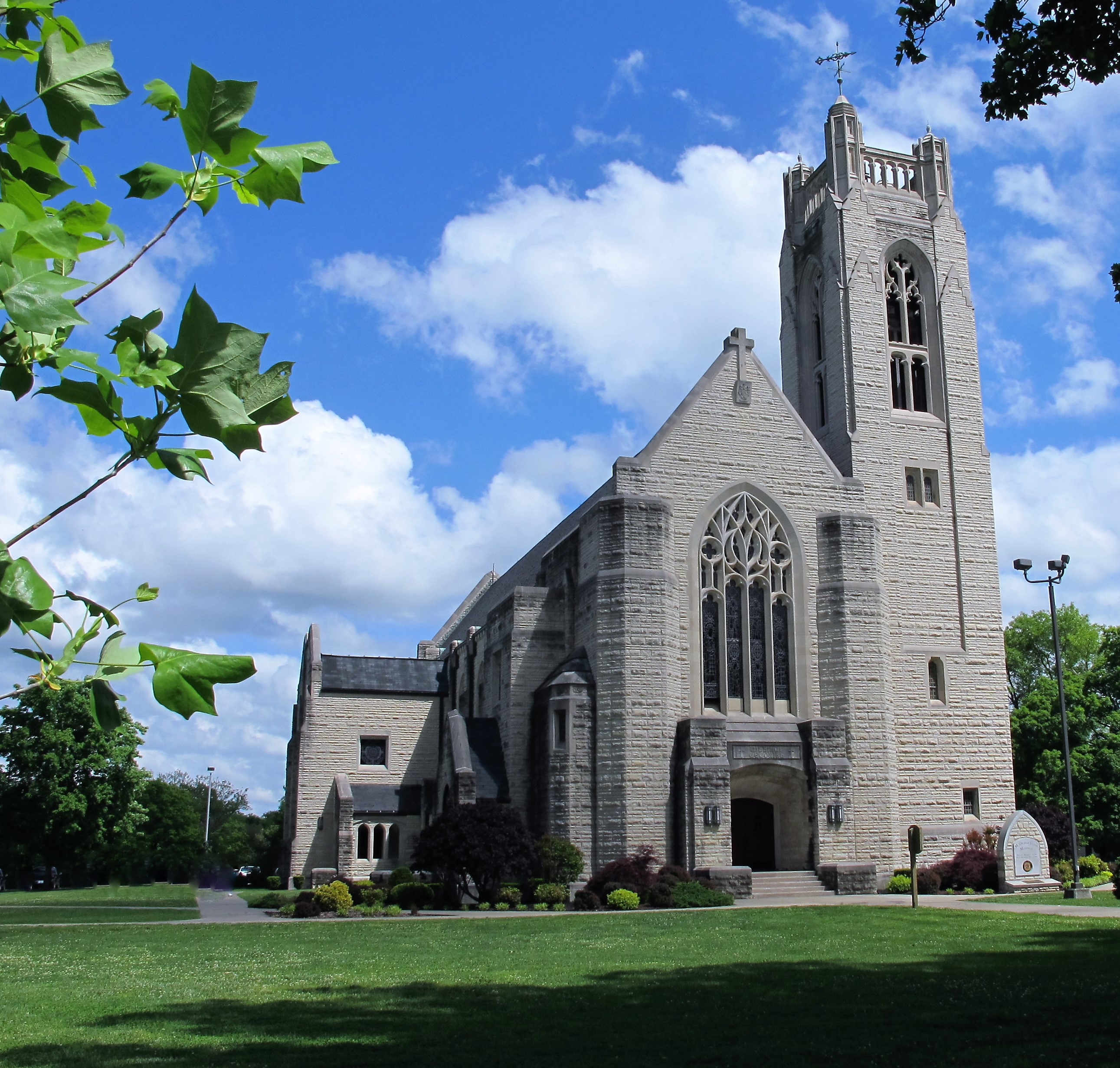
The Williams Memorial Chapel, built in 1956

In the 1950s under Robert M. Good and M. Graham Clark the school dramatically changed.

The campus expanded to 1,400 acres (567 ha), the school's Gothic chapel was built on the location of the original Dobyns Building and a hospital was added.

In 1956, with high schools becoming increasingly available in the area, the school became a junior college.

The Museum of the Ozarks took over the entire Abernathy Building and was renamed the Good Museum after president Good. It was later renamed for country music pioneer Ralph D. Foster, who donated money and exhibits for it. The museum expanded in 1969, 1977 and 1991. Among the exhibits is an original George Barris 1921 modified Oldsmobile Beverly Hillbillies truck donated by series creator Paul Henning who was inspired to do the show after a Boy Scout camping trip in the Ozarks. The museum also contains a large firearm display, including a rifle belonging to Pancho Villa.

=== 1960s to present ===
In 1965 it became a four-year college, but it did not garner regional accreditation until the 1990s.

In 1994 it was renamed the College of the Ozarks when regional accreditation was conferred.

The former president, Jerry C. Davis, instituted five goals for the college that now stand as their pillars for students to emulate:

- Academic
- Vocational
- Christian
- Patriotic
- Cultural

According to the school, out of more than 4,000 applicants, approximately 400 students are accepted to College of the Ozarks each fall semester. Students are encouraged to have at least a 20 composite on the ACT, or a 1030 on the SAT. A GPA of at least a 3.0 and ranking in the top 50% of their class is also preferred. College of the Ozarks also considers other factors for admission such as leadership, service, and financial need.

=== Controversies ===
The College of the Ozarks has faced numerous controversies, particularly regarding its policies against LGBT people, its strict biblically inspired moral code, lack of ethnic and racial diversity, and its boycott of Nike products following an ad campaign featuring Colin Kaepernick. Former LGBT students recounted pressure to undergo conversion therapy, a widely condemned practice based on pseudoscience that claims to change sexual orientation.

In 1994, the college was compared to Jonestown due to its lack of academic freedom, which contributed to struggles with accreditation.

During the 2003–2004 semesters, a professor revealed that one of the college's deans, Larry Cockrum, had obtained a fraudulent Ph.D. from Crescent City Christian College, a diploma mill. The professor was suspended and later terminated for bringing this to light, while the college's then-president, Jerry C. Davis, defended the dean. Larry Cockrum later became president of The University of the Cumberlands.

In 2017, the college introduced a controversial requirement for incoming freshmen to take a course titled "Patriotic Education and Fitness," which combines military-style physical education with military science to promote patriotism.

The college has also faced criticism for its low representation of African American students. A 1993 article in The Journal of Blacks in Higher Education ranked the College of the Ozarks second to last among Christian colleges in terms of the proportion of black students, with only 0.1% of its student body being black. Additionally, the college's decision to boycott Nike products after the Colin Kaepernick ad was criticized for racial overtones.

In 2017, The Princeton Review ranked the College of the Ozarks as the most hostile campus toward LGBT and non-binary people. In response, public relations director Valorie Coleman stated that the school does not consider itself hostile, though it enforces strict rules against "sexual immorality".

The Keeter Center Hotel, operated by the college, reserves the right to prohibit events or services inconsistent with the college's beliefs, though it claims this policy is not intended to exclude or discriminate against legally protected groups. However, this practice, coupled with the college's ongoing lawsuit against the Biden administration over dormitory segregation policies, demonstrates its continued resistance to contemporary interpretations of equality and anti-discrimination laws.

In November 2018, two students were abducted and sexually assaulted after arriving at campus ten minutes after curfew. Though the college stated that students could call security to be let in after curfew, alumni have reported fear of expulsion for missing curfew, with some resorting to sleeping in their cars to avoid punishment.

=== Presidents ===
Since 1906, there have been 15 presidents, 2 acting presidents and two chancellors.

- 1906 – A. Y. Beatie
- 1907 – George Gordon Robertson
- 1907–10 – W. I. Utterback
- 1910 – F. O. Hellier
- 1911–13 – George K. Knepper
- 1913–15 – William L. Porter
- 1915–16 – John E. Crockett
- 1916–20 – George L. Washburn
- 1920–21 – Thomas M. Barbee
- 1921–52 – R. M. Good
- 1952–75 – M. Graham Clark
- 1975–81 – Howell W. Keeter, Chancellor
- 1981–82 – Jim Spainhower
- 1983–87 – Stephen G. Jennings
- 1988–2022 – Jerry C. Davis
- 2022–Present – Brad Johnson

== Athletics ==
The College of the Ozarks (CofO) athletic teams are called the Bobcats. The college is a member of the National Association of Intercollegiate Athletics (NAIA), primarily competing in the Sooner Athletic Conference (SAC) since the 2024–25 academic year. The Bobcats are also a member of the National Christian College Athletic Association (NCCAA), primarily competing as an independent (full-time from 2021–22 to 2022–23) in the Central Region of the Division I level.

CofO competes in ten intercollegiate varsity sports teams. Men's sports include baseball, basketball, cheerleading, cross country and track & field, while women's sports include basketball, cheerleading, cross country, track & field and volleyball.

Previously, CofO competed in the NAIA as a core active member the Midlands Collegiate Athletic Conference (MCAC) from 1994–95 to 2014–15 (the final season after which the conference was later dissolved). Then CofO competed in the Association of Independent Institutions (AII, basically as an independent school in the NAIA) from 2015–16 to 2020–21 (and later again during the 2023–24 school year when it returned to the NAIA).

=== Basketball ===
The 2005–06 men's basketball team won the NAIA Division II national championship, while the Lady Cats were the runner up. The men's team was second in the basketball tournament in 2000 and 2009. From 2000 to 2017, Keeter Gymnasium was host to the NAIA Division II Basketball Championship games. In 2014, Ozarks made headlines by defeating second-ranked College of Idaho in the national tournament.

In the wake of the 2016–2017 national anthem protests at athletic events in the United States, the college announced that they would refuse to play any team whose players took a knee in the same manner as the protests. In response, College of the Ozarks chose to withdraw from hosting the Division II men's basketball champion game and agreed to aid in moving it to another venue. The championship game had been held there since 2000. In September 2018, the president of the college released a statement explaining that the school would no longer use uniforms made by Nike: "If Nike is ashamed of America, we are ashamed of them."

=== Leaving the NAIA ===
In March 2021, mid-season, former college president Jerry C. Davis decided to drop out of NAIA athletics competition (effective immediately during the 2020–21 school year), with no prior warning or discussion with players, coaches, or administrators. The president did not give a reason for the decision. After two years in the NCCAA, the school returned to the NAIA in 2023.

== Campus ==
The campus consists of the following parts:

- Williams Memorial Chapel - This Neo-Gothic chapel was built in 1956 and holds consistent public Sunday services at 11 a.m.
- The Keeter Center - The 95,000 square foot facility holds a restaurant, lodging, and other rooms/halls for events.
- The Ralph Foster Museum - This Ozarks' history museum is named after the late Ralph D. Foster, who was a prominent radio voice and philanthropist in the area.
- Fruitcake and Jelly Kitchen - The college's kitchen produces many student-made products here, including their well-known apple butter.
- Edwards Mill - This student-run mill receives power from a twelve-foot water wheel and produces meal, flour, and other products.
- Lake Honor - This small lake found in the middle of campus houses the college's swans and their cygnets.
- The Hoge Greenhouse - More than 7,000 plants including orchids, houseplants, and more can be found and purchased inside the greenhouse.
- The Gaetz Tractor Museum - This museum holds many antique farm tools, tractors, and pieces of equipment dating back to the early 1900s.
- Lyons Memorial Library
- The Ernie and Carolyn Watson Student Center - This three-floor student center was completed in 2023 and houses a coffee shop, cinema, study lounge, gaming room, community commons, and many other amenities for students to enjoy. The campus Public Safety Office is located on the basement level.
- McKibben Center
- Memorial Dorm
- Ashcroft Dorm
- McDonald Dorm
- Mabee Dorm
- Mann Dorm
- Foster Dorm
- Youngman Dorm
- Kelce Dorm
- Barrett Dorm
- Lively Dorm
- Howell W. Keeter Gymnasium
- Tilmon Fitness Center
- 91.7 FM KCOZ Radio Station

== Notable alumni ==
- Terrence R. Dake, Marine general
- David Goins, Mayor of Alton, Illinois
- April Scott, actress
- Tony Tost, writer
