= David Goins =

American politician

Mayor of Alton, Illinois
- Incumbent
- Assumed office May 12, 2021
- Preceded by: Brant Walker

Personal details
- Born: July 26, 1960 (age 66)
- Spouse: Sheila Goins
- Children: 3
- Education: College of the Ozarks (BA)

David Goins (born July 26, 1960) is an American politician who was elected in 2021 as the first African American mayor of Alton, Illinois.

== Biography ==
Goins was born on July 26, 1960, the son of Mark and Opal Goins. His mother died in 1967 and his father died in 1971. He was raised thereafter by his grandparents. In 1978, he graduated from Alton High School where he was an all-star basketball player. In 1983, he graduated from the College of the Ozarks on a full basketball scholarship with a B.A. in English. After school, he worked as a detention officer and correctional officer at the Madison County Department of Court and Probation Services. In 1986, he joined the Alton Police Department reaching sergeant in 1999. He retired as a police office in 2010. in 2016, he was elected to the Alton school board.

In 2021, Goins entered the race for mayor of Alton on a platform focusing on the recruitment of new businesses, job growth, the revitalization of the downtown, COVID-19 vaccinations, and the encouragement of recent college graduates to return to the city. He was supported by the local unions. On April 6, 2021, Goins was elected mayor of Alton defeating two-term Mayor Brant Walker 2,021-1,625 to become the first African-American mayor since the city's founding in 1818. In 2019, Alton was 68.7% white, 24.9% Black, 0.4% Asian, 1.6% Latino, and 4.3% multi-racial. He was sworn in on May 12, 2021. In July 2021, Illinois Governor J. B. Pritzker appointed Goins to the Central Port District Board. Upon taking office, he faced 8.5% unemployment, the loss or closure of over 200 businesses due to COVID-19, and a budget shortfall fueled by underfunded public employees' pensions. In his first term, he reversed a $3.1 million deficit to a $2.1 million surplus, established a new business district that attracted major national retailers, and hired additional police officers and fully equipped the force with body-worn cameras.

Goins defeated Brant Walker and Raymond Strebel in the April 1, 2025 general election.

== Personal life ==
In 1985, he married Sheila Goins; they have three children. Since 2001, he has served as a pastor at the Morning Star Missionary Baptist Church in Alton. In 2018, he was diagnosed with prostate cancer.

== See also ==
- List of first African-American mayors
