= Samuel Buckmaster =

Illinois politician

Samuel A. Buckmaster (c. 1817–1878) was a prison warden, mayor, and state legislator in Illinois. He served as Speaker of the Illinois House of Representatives during the 23rd General Assembly. He served in the Illinois House and Illinois Senate.

== Career ==
He was first elected to the Illinois House of Representatives in 1851 and served two terms. He was the mayor of Alton, Illinois from 1853 to 1854. He was a member of the Illinois Senate from 1859 to 1862. He returned to the House in 1863 during which he was selected as speaker and presided over a politically fraught session in the height of the American Civil War. He served a single term later in the 1870s. He ran unsuccessfully for the Illinois Senate in the 1878 general election.

An act was passed to lease the state penitentiary (Illinois State Prison) to him.

Governor Richard Yates wrote to him in opposition of a redistricting plan.

In 1877 James Shaw was elected Speaker of the House over Buckmaster.

== Personal life ==
Buckmaster was born in Virginia in 1817.

Nathaniel Buckmaster, who also served as a state legislator and warden of the state penitentiary, was his uncle.

He bred cattle.

The Colonel Samuel Buckmaster House at 514 State Street in Alton, Illinois 1835? is listed on National Register of Historic Places as part of the Christian Hill Historic District.

He died November 13, 1878.

== See also ==
- Alton Military Prison
