= Charles Herb =

American politician (1846–1895)

Member of the Illinois Senate
- In office 1895

Personal details
- Born: Charles August Herb; September 21, 1846 Kingdom of Württemberg
- Died: October 18, 1895 (aged 49) Alton, Illinois, U.S.
- Party: Republican
- Occupation: Politician, merchant

Military service
- Allegiance: United States
- Branch/service: United States Army (Union army)
- Battles/wars: American Civil War

Charles August Herb (September 21, 1846 – October 18, 1895) was an American merchant and politician.

Born in the Kingdom of Württemberg, Herb emigrated with his family in 1852 to the United States and settled in New York City, in Fosterburg, Illinois, and then in Alton, Illinois. Herb served in the Union Army during the American Civil War. Herb was a merchant and lived in Alton, Illinois. Herb served on the Madison County, Illinois Board of Commissioners. He also served on the Alton city council and was the mayor of Alton. In 1895, he served in the Illinois State Senate and was a Republican.

Herb died at age 49 at his home in Alton, Illinois in 1895, following a stroke.
