= KCOZ =

- Point Lookout, Missouri; United States
- Frequency: 91.7 MHz
- Branding: College of the Ozarks Christian Radio

Programming
- Format: Christian Contemporary

Ownership
- Owner: College of the Ozarks

History
- Former call signs: KSOZ
- Call sign meaning: K College of the Ozarks

Technical information
- Licensing authority: FCC
- Facility ID: 12287
- Class: A
- ERP: 200 watts
- HAAT: 57.0 meters (187.0 ft)
- Transmitter coordinates: 36°36′39″N 93°14′23″W

Links
- Public license information: Public file; LMS
- Website: Official website

KCOZ (The Lookout 91.7 FM, College of the Ozarks Christian Radio) is a radio station that broadcast a Jazz music format until switching to a Contemporary Christian music format in late 2011. Licensed to Point Lookout, Missouri, United States, the station is currently owned by College of the Ozarks. Previously the radio station operated as KSOZ, a National Public Radio (NPR) affiliate. As of January 2021, KCOZ can be found streaming online at KCOZ.live and also on the KCOZ Radio app.
