= 2014 NAIA Division II men's basketball tournament =

Annual college basketball tournament in the United States

- Logo for the 2014 National Championship
- Teams: 32
- Finals site: Keeter Gymnasium, Point Lookout, Missouri
- Champions: Indiana Wesleyan Wildcats (1st title, 1st title game, 1st Fab Four)
- Runner-up: Midland Warriors (1st title game, 1st Fab Four)
- Semifinalists: Southeastern Fire (1st Fab Four); Robert Morris Eagles (2nd Fab Four)
- Coach of the year: Greg Tonagel (Indiana Wesleyan)
- Player of the year: Jordan Weidner (Indiana Wesleyan)
- Charles Stevenson Hustle Award: Lane Mahurin (Indiana Wesleyan)
- Chuck Taylor MVP: Jordan Weidner (Indiana Wesleyan)
- Attendance: 26,400
- Top scorer: Jordan Weidner (Indiana Wesleyan) (115 points)

The 2014 NAIA Division II Men's Basketball national championship was held in March at Keeter Gymnasium in Point Lookout, Missouri. The 21st annual NAIA basketball tournament featured thirty-two teams playing in a single-elimination format. The championship game was won by Indiana Wesleyan of Marion, Indiana over Midland University of Fremont, Nebraska by a score of 78 to 68.

== Tournament field ==
The 2014 tournament field was announced March 5, 2014. The field featured defending champion and top seed Cardinal Stritch University as well as runner-up William Penn University. Two conferences, the Crossroads League and The Sun Conference garnered four bids apiece, while four other conferences received three bids each. The field included five first-time attendees: Cincinnati Christian University, Northern New Mexico College from Española, New Mexico, Northwest Christian University from Eugene, Oregon, Reinhardt University of Alpharetta, Georgia and Southeastern University of Lakeland, Florida.

College of the Ozarks, who received an automatic bid as the host team, leads the field in total invitations with eighteen, while Bethel College of Mishawaka, Indiana leads the field with three national championships. Defending national champion Cardinal Stritch of Milwaukee, Wisconsin earned an automatic berth as regular-season champions out of the Chicagoland Collegiate Athletic Conference, the Wolves eleventh championship appearance overall and fifth-straight. They entered the championship as the top ranked team in each of the last seven Coaches' Polls.

== Highlights ==
=== First round ===
The first round was fairly typical, with higher seeded teams winning most games with only a couple of exceptions. Unseeded William Penn from Oskaloosa, Iowa and sixth seed Dordt College of Sioux Center, Iowa played a memorable double-overtime game. The teams combined for two hundred and thirty-four points, besting the old mark for most combined points in a game (two hundred twenty-two) set by Cornerstone University from Grand Rapids, Michigan and Bethel in 1999. With less than a minute in the second overtime, Kelly Madison hit a step-back three to put the William Penn Statesmen on top one hundred eighteen to one hundred sixteen for the win over the Defenders. Madison recorded the tournaments highest individual scoring performance with thirty-eight points while teammate Alex Schwab scored twenty-seven. Blake Walker managed a triple-double with ten points, eleven rebounds and ten assists. For Dordt, Austin Katje put in thirty-three points, tying for the third most three-pointers made with eight and three-pointers attempted with eighteen. Nathan Rindels tallied a triple-double as well, with twenty-one points, eleven rebounds and fourteen assists. Two other Defenders, Kyle Lindbergh (twenty, ten) and Dalton Franken (twenty-five, ten) achieved double-doubles. Dordt played the entire second overtime with just one starter (Lindbergh) on the floor due to fouls.

The Thursday evening session began with the first overtime game of the day as Demarko Nash of Robert Morris hit a three-pointer with two seconds left in regulation put the game into overtime. Robert Morris continued to defeat number fourteen Saint Francis sixty-nine to sixty-three. The big upset of the day came as the Bobcats from host school College of the Ozarks shot sixty-one per cent from the field while using their home-court advantage and huge games from junior Alex Santiago and Nathan Simniok to upset the number two-seeded College of Idaho Yotes. In another close game, St Thomas Bobcats’ guard Kevin Hincapie knocked down a three-pointer from the left win as time expired to propel his team to victory over Union.

=== Second round ===
While the first round was quiet, the second round of the 2014 tourney was filled with upsets as the three remaining top-four seeds went down. Unseeded Southeastern University from Lakeland, Florida, led by a twenty-nine point, eight for eight from the field (four for four from beyond the arc) performance by Jake Hodges, needed a three pointer from Dwayne Johnson with two tenths of a second left to take down top seed and defending champion Cardinal Stritch. After ten lead changes in the last eight minutes, Stritch had a two-point lead with less than five seconds remaining. Johnson brought the ball the length of the floor and fired a three at the buzzer for a one-point Fire win.

In spite of a twenty-one point performance by Vernon Payne, the unseeded Robert Morris Eagles made a 7-0 run to finish the game and eliminated the three seed Indiana University Southeast Grenadiers, 71-66. Fourth seeded Cornerstone met their match in unseeded Friends. Friends came out shooting and cruised to an eighteen-point lead behind NAIA player of the year Joe Mitchell, ultimately winning the game seventy-nine to sixty-nine. When the round was over, the only seeded teams remaining were number five Indiana Wesleyan, number nine Davenport, and number ten, Midland.

=== Elite Eight ===
After scoring two-hundred and twenty-two points in the first two rounds, the William Penn Statesmen's run was brought to an end by Robert Morris (Illinois) in a seventy-nine to seventy-eight contest. The Statesmen scored the first eight points of the game, but the Eagles turned to Harry Singh off the bench for three three-pointers and Jarrell Turner for a two to gain the lead at 29-28. William Penn regained the lead on a three by Demarko Nash and held a narrow lead until layups by Blake Walker and Alec Schwab brought the margin to one point with just over a minute left. Neither team was able to score for the rest of the contest, leaving Robert Morris to advance to the Fab Four by virtue of a one-point victory. First-time guest Southeastern continued its run of victories over higher-seeded teams with a three-point win over Davenport, while the Indiana Wesleyan Wildcats continued its streak of double-digit wins with a ninety-five to seventy-nine win over Friends. The fourth semifinal position was claimed by the Midland Warriors with a seventy-six to seventy win over three-time champion Bethel College.

=== Fab Four ===
As befits a tournament of upsets, three of the four teams were in their first-ever Fab Four appearance. In the first semifinal game, Indiana Wesleyan took off to an early lead over the Southeastern Fire. A Jake Hodges free throw for Southeastern tied the game at eight, but IWU answered right back and never trailed again, although the Fire would pull back within three just before the half on a layup by Dana Thomas. Indiana Wesleyan used disciplined offense and unrelenting defense to gradually pullaway to a ninety-eight to seventy-seven victory. Jordan Weidner scored twenty-nine points for the Wildcats and was joined in double figures by brothers R.J. Mahurin and Lane Mahurin, Nathan Bubash and Zac Vandewater. For the Fire, Dwayne Johnson led with 28 points, followed by Hodges and Thomas with eleven and Timothy Mitchell with ten.

On the other half of the bracket, Midland recorded an impressive one hundred to sixty-one shellacking of Robert Morris. In what was to become the widest Fab Four margin of victory in tournament history, Midland jumped to a sixteen to two lead over Robert Morris just three minutes into the game. Ben Imig led Midland with twenty-seven points, while Alex Starkel and Galen Gullie added fourteen and thirteen respectively. Jarrel Turner led Robert Morris with fourteen points while Sean Montgomery added ten points. Courtney Bell grabbed eleven boards for Robert Morris.

=== Championship game ===
The fifth-seeded Indiana Wesleyan Wildcats became the first team in the history of the tournament to win all of its contests by double digits as they defeated the Midland Warriors by ten points for the crown. IWU never trailed in the game, building a ten-point lead just seven minutes into the game. Midland closed to within one point on a three pointer by Avery Langford, but baskets by Zac Vandewater and Lane Mahurin quickly put IWU back up by five. In the second half, Indiana Wesleyan took control, ultimately winning the game by a score of seventy-eight to sixty-eight. Jordan Weidner led the Wildcats in scoring with twenty-one. He was joined in double figures by RJ Mahurin with nineteen, Lane Mahurin with eleven and Zac Vandewater with ten. Vandewater led all teams in rebounding with ten. For Midland, Ben Imig led in scoring with seventeen, along with a team leading six assists. He was closely followed by Franklin Marcus with fifteen and Alex Starkel with ten. Starkel added nine rebounds, while Brandon Williams grabbed seven.

== Tourney awards and honors ==
- Dr. James Naismith/Emil Liston Team Sportsmanship Award: Indiana Wesleyan

=== Individual recognition ===
- Most Outstanding Player: Jordan Weidner, Indiana Wesleyan
- Championship Hustle Award: Lane Mahurin, Indiana Wesleyan
- NABC/NAIA Division II Coach of the Year: Greg Tonagel, Indiana Wesleyan
- Rawlings-NAIA Division II National Coach of the Year: Todd Eisner, Midland
- 2014 NAIA Division II Men's Basketball All-Championship Team
  - Joe Mitchell-Friends (Kan.)
  - Dwayne Johnson-Southeastern (Fla.)
  - Tim Mitchell-Southeastern (Fla.)
  - Dominez Burnett-Davenport (Mich.)
  - RJ Mahurin-Indiana Wesleyan
  - Ben Imig-Midland (Neb.)
  - Galen Gullie-Midland (Neb.)
  - Jarrell Turner-Robert Morris (Ill.)
  - Alec Schwab-William Penn
  - Kelly Madison-William Penn

=== Statistical leaders ===
(minimum 4 games)

Category	Player	School	Tally
Most points	Jordan Weidner	Indiana Wesleyan	115
Most points per game	Dwayne Johnson	Southeastern	26.25
Leading rebounder	Lane Mahurin	Indiana Wesleyan	44
Leading rebounder per game	Timothy Mitchell	Southeastern	10.25
Most assists	Jordan Weidner	Indiana Wesleyan	28
Assists per game	Jordan Weidner	Indiana Wesleyan	5.6
Assist/Turnover ratio	Galen Gullie	Midland	3.6 (18,5)
Three-pointers made	Ben Imig	Midland	10 (tie)
Three-pointers made	Jake Hodges	Southeastern	10 (tie)
Best overall field goal percentage	Jake Hodges	Southeastern	62.5% (20-32)
Best 3-point field goal percentage	Jake Hodges	Southeastern	62.5% (10-16)
Most free throws made	Jordan Weidner	Indiana Wesleyan	36
Best free throw percentage	Jordan Weidner	Indiana Wesleyan	85.7% (36-42)
Most steals	Jordan Hester	Robert Morris	9
Most steals per game	Jordan Hester	Robert Morris	2.25
Most shots blocked	Timothy Mitchell	Southeastern	9
Most shots blocked per game	Timothy Mitchell	Southeastern	2.25

== Bracket ==
First round March 12–13	Second round March 14
1	Cardinal Stritch (Wisconsin) (29–4)	74
--	Northern New Mexico (16–15)	53
1	Cardinal Stritch	70
--	Southeastern	71
16	Huntington (Indiana) (24–7)	76
--	Southeastern (Florida) (24–6)	84
1st seed tier March 7
9	Davenport (Michigan) (27–6)	63
--	Ashford (Iowa) (23–9)	46
9	Davenport	67
8	Bellevue	65
--	Concordia (Oregon) (22–9)	79
8	Bellevue (Nebraska) (28–5)	81
5	Indiana Wesleyan (26–6)	82
--	Reinhardt (Georgia) (17–13)	67
5	Indiana Wesleyan	87
--	Oklahoma Wesleyan	75
--	Oklahoma Wesleyan (24–9)	76
12	Morningside (Iowa) (25–8)	72
4th seed tier March 7
13	Northwood (Florida) (26–6)	85
--	Friends (Kansas) (25–6)	90
--	Friends	79
4	Cornerstone	69
--	Northwest Christian (Oregon) (18–12)	68
4	Cornerstone (Michigan) (29–4)	84
3	IU Southeast (Indiana) (25–4)	77
--	Tabor (Kan.) (20-12)	75
3	IU Southeast	66
--	Robert Morris	71
--	Robert Morris (IL) (23–9)	69*
14	Saint Francis (IN) (21–10)	66
3rd seed tier March 8
11	St. Thomas (FL) (25–6)	75
--	Union (KY) (28–4)	72
11	St. Thomas	83
--	William Penn	106
--	William Penn (Iowa) (22–9)	118**
6	Dordt (Iowa) (28–5)	116
7	Saint Xavier (Ill.) (29–4)	87
--	Cincinnati Christian (Ohio) (19–13)	71
7	Saint Xavier	61
10	Midland	64
--	Embry-Riddle (Fla.) (24–7)	61
10	Midland (Neb.) (26–5)	69
2nd seed tier March 8
15	Cal Maritime (27–5)	75
--	Bethel (Ind.) (26–7)	85*
--	Bethel	67
--	College of the Ozarks	64
--	College of the Ozarks (Mo.) (21–10)	88
2	College of Idaho (28–5)	84

Quarterfinals; March 15
--	Southeastern	67
9	Davenport	64
5	Indiana Wesleyan	95
--	Friends	79
--	Robert Morris	79
--	William Penn	78
10	Midland	76
--	Bethel	70

Semifinals; March 17
--	Southeastern	77
5	Indiana Wesleyan	98
--	Robert Morris	61
10	Midland	100

Championship; March 18
5	Indiana Wesleyan	78
10	Midland	68

- * denotes overtime.

== Epilogue ==
Only two players who made it to the tournament Fab Four, Jordan Weidner of Indiana Wesleyan (who was named the tournaments Most Outstanding Player), and Dwayne Johnson of Southeastern were named to the NAIA All-America team. The post-season coaches poll on the other hand was heavily influenced by the outcome of the tournament, as Indiana Wesleyan and Midland wound up in first and second place respectively, while Southeastern and Robert Morris wound up third and fifth. Cardinal Stritch fell to fourth in the rankings. Indiana Wesleyan head coach Greg Tonagel was honored as the NABC Division II Men's Basketball Coach of the Year and Todd Eisner of Midland (Neb.) was named the NAIA Division II Men's Basketball Coach of the Year. Mitchell Wiggins of Southeastern was drafted by the Harlem Globetrotters.

== NAIA Division II Men’s Basketball All-America Teams ==
Team	Name	School	Hometown
1	Dominez Burnett	Davenport (Mich.)	Flint, Mich.
1	Adam Herman	Concordia (Ore.)	Vancouver, Wash.
1	Wes Hudson	Cornerstone (Mich.)	Wyoming, Mich.
1	Dwayne Johnson	Southeastern (Fla.)	Miami, Fla.
1	Brad Karp	Saint Xavier (Ill.)	Valparaiso, Ind.
1	Kyle Lindbergh	Dordt (Iowa)	Margate, Fla.
1	Joe Mitchell	Friends (Kan.)	Wichita, Kan.
1	Derek Semenas	Cardinal Stritch	Rosendale, Wis.
1	Chris Solomon	Northwood (Fla.)	Los Angeles, Calif.
1	Jordan Weidner	Indiana Wesleyan	Danville, Ind.
2	Aaron Evans	Marian (Ind.)	Indianapolis, Ind.
2	Devin Harris	Oklahoma Wesleyan	Edmond, Okla.
2	Mark Hoge	Jamestown (N.D.)	Ironton, Minn.
2	Idris Ibn Idris	Bethany (Kan.)	San Diego, Calif.
2	RJ Mahurin	Indiana Wesleyan	Rockville, Ind.
2	Shane Merryman	Huntington (Ind.)	Fort Wayne, Ind.
2	Nick Reed	Doane (Neb.)	Syracuse, Neb.
2	Danny Rudeen	Morningside (Iowa)	Sioux City, Iowa
2	Eric Thompson	Southern Oregon	Roseburg, Ore.
2	Justyn Watkins	Thomas (Ga.)	Altamonte Springs Fla.
3	Michael Greene	Northwest (Wash.)	Bellingham, Wash.
3	Joshua Hart	Virginia Intermont	Edgewood, Md.
3	Scott Kohne	Saint Francis (Ind.)	Fort Wayne, Ind.
3	Brady Lollman	Hastings (Neb.)	Norfolk, Neb.
3	Cameron Mitchell	IU Southeast (Ind.)	Cincinnati, Ohio
3	C.J. Penny	Asbury (Ky.)	Lawrenceburg, Ky.
3	Taylor Pruett	College of Idaho	Arroyo Grande, Calif.
3	Jalen Voss	Dakota Wesleyan (S.D.)	Worthington, Minn.
3	Blake Walker	William Penn (Iowa)	Rose Garden, Ga.
3	Anthony Woods	Ashford (Iowa)	Normal, Ill.
HM	Michael Simpson	Saint Xavier (Ill.)	
HM	Stavros Schizas	Rochester (Mich.)	
HM	Matthew Brito	Northern New Mexico	
HM	Tylon Deal	St. Ambrose (Iowa)	
HM	Spencer Coleman	Northwest Christian (Ore.)	
HM	Dylan Hale	Dakota State (S.D.)	
HM	Tyler Fangman	IU East (Ind.)	
HM	Nathane Simniok	College of the Ozarks (Mo.)	
HM	Lee Ames	Bellevue (Neb.)	
HM	Tyler Woods	Oklahoma Wesleyan	
HM	Bobby Naubert	Madonna (Mich.)	
HM	JaVontae Ford	Davenport (Mich.)	
HM	Johnny Elliott	Northwestern Ohio	
HM	Rob Hogans	Spring Arbor (Mich.)	
HM	Ryan Benner	Bethel (Ind.)	
HM	Greg Miller	Grace (Ind.)	
HM	Austin Fox	Saint Francis (Ind.)	
HM	Zach Miller	Bethel (Ind.)	
HM	Julian Rose	Ottawa (Kan.)	
HM	Cameron Clark	Southwestern (Kan.)	
HM	Grant Greenberg	St. Mary (Kan.)	

== See also ==
- 2014 NAIA Division I men's basketball tournament
- 2014 NCAA Division I men's basketball tournament
- 2014 NCAA Division II men's basketball tournament
- 2014 NCAA Division III men's basketball tournament
- 2014 NAIA Division II women's basketball tournament
