= Alton Little Theater =

Coordinates: 38.9155°N 90.1771°W

Alton Little Theater, founded in 1933, is a non-profit community theater located in Alton, Illinois. Dorothy Colonius, a local English teacher, along with other educators and their students worked to create a community theater in Alton. Dorothy became the permanent artistic director and pushed for a permanent home for the theater.

Alton Little Theater (ALT) is the oldest live theater in Illinois run continuous shows. ALT traditionally produces five shows a year from September to May. As of the start of their 89th season in 2022, they have had over 500 productions.

ALT has received nominations for Arts For Life awards, most recently garnering several nominations and two wins for their 2009 production of Radio Gals.

Since 2025, the theater has been embroiled in controversy due to the mishandling of sexual misconduct allegations leveled at previous board members, and the actions of current director, Eric Sykes.

== Controversies ==
=== Sexual misconduct allegations ===
In January 2025, Alton Little Theater was the subject of public reporting regarding sexual misconduct allegations involving individuals associated with the organization. According to First Alert 4, a former actress alleged that an incident occurred in 2016 in Godfrey, Illinois. The reporting stated that a civil no-contact order related to the matter had been issued in 2019 and later expired, and that no criminal charges had been filed in connection with the allegations at that time.

As of the reporting, local authorities were referenced in connection with the matter, though no convictions or criminal proceedings were reported in the available coverage.

=== 2026 leadership dispute and DEI resignation ===
In 2026, Alton Little Theater faced additional public attention following a dispute involving executive director Eric Sykes and a community member on social media. According to The Telegraph, the dispute included criticism of comments made by Sykes and broader concerns about the organization's handling of prior allegations.

Following the incident, Malcolm Kraft, who served as the organization's diversity, equity, and inclusion (DEI) chair, resigned. Kraft told The Telegraph that Sykes's past anti-LBGT social media posts, which included hateful statements rejecting nonbinary identities and criticizing Pride-related merchandise, were a factor in his decision to resign.

The controversy prompted calls from members of the local theater community for Sykes to step down. In response, Sykes released a public statement denying that Alton Little Theater was an unsafe environment, describing allegations circulating online as "false and misleading" and stating that the organization was committed to treating "every person who walks through our doors" with respect regardless of background or beliefs. This statement was meant with widespread backlash, leading to Alton Little Theater locking the comments on the post and blocking dissenting voices, thus furthering the boycott.

At the time of this writing, Sykes has not been removed and the boycott against Alton Little Theater remains in place.
