= Donald Juel =

American educator and scholar

- Born: March 4, 1942
- Died: February 23, 2003 (aged 60)

Academic background
- Education: Yale University
- Thesis: (1973)

Academic work
- Discipline: New Testament scholar

Donald Harrisville Juel (March 4, 1942 – February 23, 2003) was an American educator and New Testament scholar.

Donald Harrisville Juel was born in Alton, Illinois. His education included B.A. from St. Olaf College (1964), B.D. from Luther Seminary (1968), and Ph.D. in New Testament from Yale University (1973).

He was Richard J. Dearborn Professor of New Testament Theology at Princeton Theological Seminary from 1995 until his death. He had previously taught at Indiana University (1972–1974) and had served as Professor of New Testament at Luther Seminary (1978 to 1995).

Juel was a member of the Society for the Study of the New Testament and the Society of Biblical Literature. In 2005, a Festschrift was published in his memory. Edited by Beverly Roberts Gaventa and Patrick D. Miller, The Ending of Mark and the Ends of God consists of reflections on and responses to an article that Juel had written on the ending of Mark's gospel.(Louisville, KY: Westminster John Knox Press. ISBN 978-0664227395)

== Selected works ==
- Juel, Donald H. (1973). Luke-Acts: the promise of history. Atlanta, GA: John Knox Press. ISBN 9780804203210. OCLC 896775600.
- ———; Ackerman, James Stokes; Warshaw, Thayer S. (1978). An Introduction to New Testament Literature. Nashville, TN: Abingdon. ISBN 9780687013609. OCLC 3516642.
- ——— (1988). Messianic Exegesis: Christological interpretation of the Old Testament in early Christianity. Philadelphia, PA: Fortress Press. ISBN 9780800608408. OCLC 15792376.
- ——— (1999). The Gospel of Mark. Interpreting Biblical Text. Nashville, TN: Abingdon. ISBN 9780687008490. OCLC 41143047.
- ______ (1990) Mark. Augsburg Commentary of the New Testament. Minneapolis: Augsburg Fortress.
