= Haskell Playhouse =

Historic house in Illinois, United States

- U.S. National Register of Historic Places
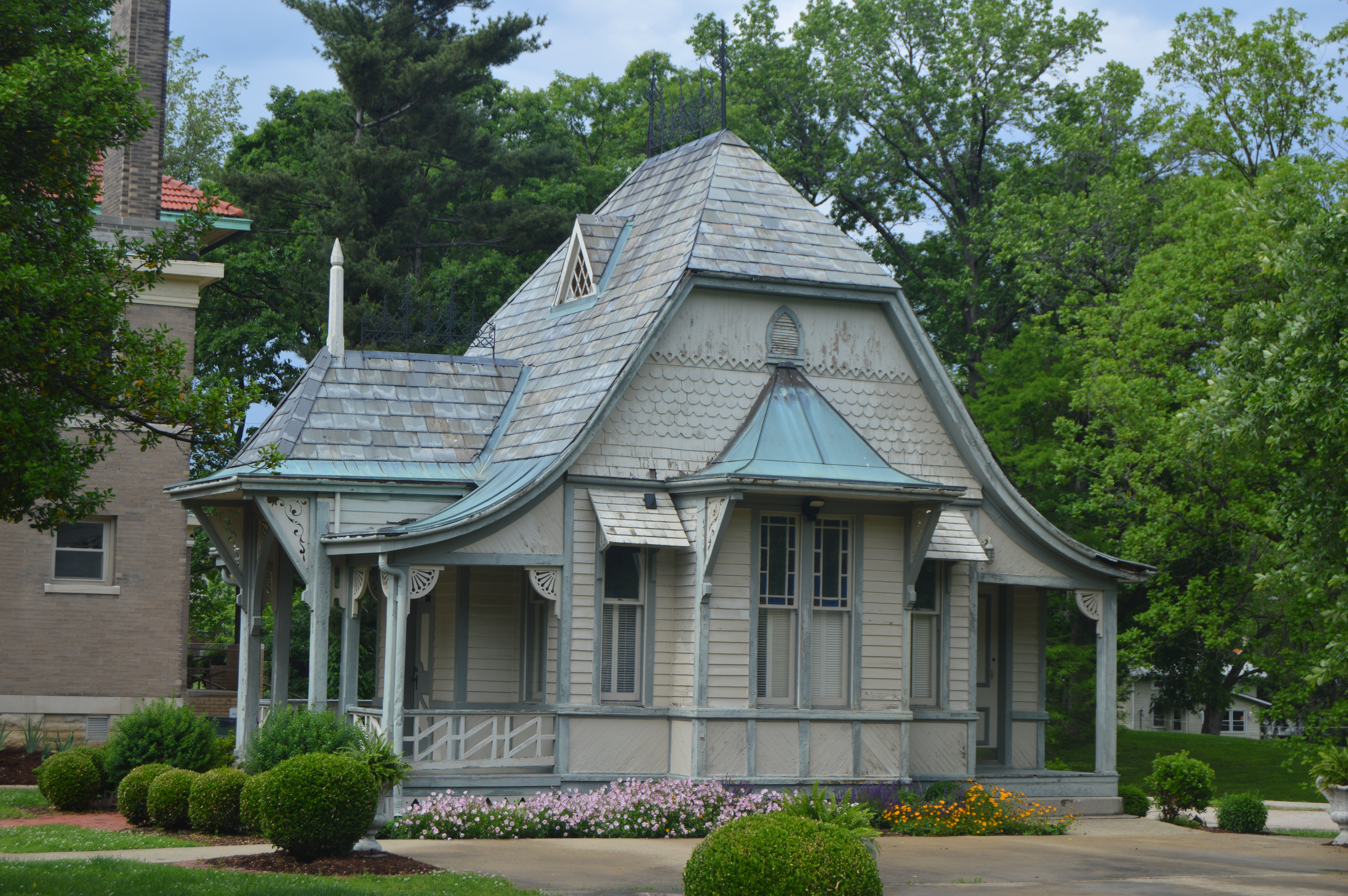
- Front and southern side

- Location within Illinois Location within the United States
- Location: Henry St. in Haskell Park, Alton, Illinois
- Coordinates: 38°53′56″N 90°10′33″W
- Area: 1 acre (0.40 ha)
- Built: 1885
- Architect: Pfeiffenberger, Lucas
- Architectural style: Queen Anne
- NRHP reference No.: 74000768
- Added to NRHP: July 30, 1974

The Haskell Playhouse is a children's playhouse located in Haskell Park in Alton, Illinois. Dr. William Abraham Haskell, a physician and one of the wealthiest residents of Alton, commissioned the playhouse as a present for his daughter Lucy's fifth birthday in 1885. Architect Lucas Pfeiffenberger designed the playhouse in the Queen Anne style. The house's design features a raised front porch with a projecting entrance, diagonal stickwork on the porch and first floor, and fishscale shingles on the second-story gable ends. An ornamental iron fence with a small spire tops the house's hipped roof. Lucy Haskell died of diphtheria four years after her playhouse was built, and by 1916 her mother Florence (Hayner) Haskell was the only surviving Haskell still living in Alton. Florence demolished the family's home that year but kept the playhouse as a memorial to her daughter; she donated the land to the city to serve as a memorial park.

The playhouse was added to the National Register of Historic Places on July 30, 1974.
