= Edmond Beall =

American politician

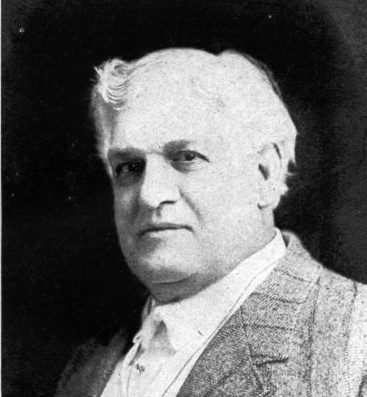

Edmund Beall (September 27, 1848 – January 31, 1920) was an influential member of society, an industrialist, and an Illinois state senator.

== Early life ==
Beall was born in Alton, Illinois on September 27, 1848. His parents, John and Mary, were one of the earliest families to settle in the city. As a young child, he witnessed the final Lincoln–Douglas Debate held in Alton on October 15, 1858. This debate occurred during Abraham Lincoln's race for the Illinois Senate against incumbent Senator Stephen Douglas. Later in life, Beall recalled the event describing the physical differences between the two men. “Lincoln appeared like a giant in comparison with Douglas. I understand he was six feet three inches in height. Everyone was astounded at the difference in the height of the two men.”

Beall was educated while attending primary school in the town's public system. When he was seven years old, his father died. At the age of twelve, Beall was hired as an office boy and spent four years learning the printers’ trade at the local paper, the Alton Daily Telegraph.

As a teenager, he enlisted in the army on May 12, 1864 as a member of Company D. One Hundred and Thirty-Third Illinois Infantry. Beall was one of the youngest soldiers in the Union army in the Civil War. He was often stationed in Springfield for his duties. After President Abraham Lincoln’s assassination, his remains were eventually brought to Springfield, Illinois. Beall, just a teenager, was called to Springfield to help "drape Lincoln's home in mourning". Beall recalls the atmosphere when he arrived in Springfield he found "great sorrow...the people seemed as if they had lost all heart." Later the President was eventually placed to rest in Oak Ridge Cemetery.

== Family ==
Beall married Mary Harris on September 10, 1868 in Alton. A believer in large American families, the couple had eight children. Their names were Edmond, Charles, Frank, Hattie May, Abbie Lou, Edward Wesley, Edmund Harris and Charles Roy. Two of his sons, Edmond and Charles, died in infancy. Influenced by his strong belief in family, Beall attracted nationwide attention by building one of the first housing units to encourage couples with multiple children to move in. The apartments became thereafter known as the 'Stork Nest' flats in Alton.

In 1909, Beall purchased a home for his family on "Millionaire's Row". A street where mansions were built in the 1870s to early 1900s. He lived there with his wife until his death. Today, his home is known as the Beall Mansion. In 1911, Beall toured Europe and brought back many influences from abroad. "Ever being a lover of art and flowers, Mr. Beall brought back many handsome trophies which now adorn his beautiful home on Twelfth Street" While in Europe, Beall visited Queen Wilhelmina of the Netherlands. She presented the 'Stork Mayor" of Alton a beautiful diamond. In 1918, Mr. and Mrs. Beall celebrated their fiftieth wedding anniversary in their home. According to the local paper, "Mr. Beall presented his wife with fifty white roses, bearing the card "Still My Bride." He also gave her fifty dollars in gold in honor of the golden event."

== Businessman ==
Upon his return from the army, Beall went to serve an apprenticeship with his step-father, J. Millen. During the apprenticeship, Beall learned the trade of manufacturing mining tools. In 1872, Beall and his brother, Charles, started a small firm to manufacture mining tools. They named it Beall Brothers. The company continued to expand into multiple firms, but eventually was consolidated. In 1905, The Iron Trade Review reported the status of the manufacturing company, "The Beall Bros Mining Tool Company, the Beall Shovel Company of Alton Ill., and the CL Beall Manufacturing Company of East Alton Ill. have been consolidated into one company the Beall Bros Co. The capital stock is $158,000." By 1907, the Beall family had built their company into the largest manufacturer of miner's tools, railroad implements and heavy equipment in the United States. According to records, "The product of the three factories equals a million dollars in value annually."

== Political life ==
Beall began his political life as an Alderman of the fourth ward of Alton. In 1905, Beall, became a candidate for mayor of Alton. He won the election and went on to serve three successful terms of two years each, from 1905 to 1911, the only man in the history of the city who achieved that. As mayor, he helped implement multiple solutions to improve the city. He became the head of the streets and alleys committee and vigorously promoted the paving of Alton streets with brick. “He is considered the man who pulled Alton out of the mud by spearheading the paving of streets and roads throughout the city.” According to the History of Madison County, from 1905 to 1911 Beall helped pave "twenty miles of streets...nearly half as many miles of sewer, and began building of concrete sidewalks" Furthermore, Beall continued to help beautify the city "by having flower-beds placed in the arid byways. Rock Spring Park was given Alton by William Elliot Smith through Mr. Beall 's suggestion...A fine Country Club was planned and a splendid golf course soon arranged."

He was elected State Senator of Illinois on November 8, 1910, from the Forty-seventh Senatorial District. While in the Senate, Beall introduced a bill to erect a monument to commemorate the first territorial governor, Ninian Edwards. In Madison County, Senator Beall with other representatives propositioned the purchase and preservation of the Great Cahokia Mound. After his term in the Capitol ended, Senator Beall returned to Alton and went on to be elected Mayor of Alton again in 1914 and served for a fourth term from 1915-1917.

== Death ==
Beall died while on vacation with his wife in California on January 31, 1920. According to his obituary, erysipelas with complications was the cause of his death. He is buried in Alton City Cemetery, Alton, Illinois.
