= John W. Coppinger =

American politician and lawyer (1852–1900)

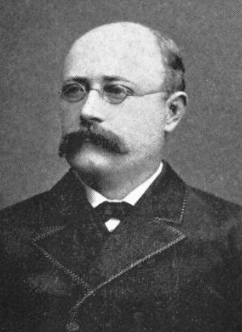

Member of the Illinois Senate
- In office 1891–1895

Illinois House of Representatives
- In office 1887–1889

Personal details
- Born: John William Coppinger; January 12, 1852 Alton, Illinois, US
- Died: December 8, 1900 (aged 48) Alton, Illinois, US
- Party: Democratic
- Occupation: Lawyer

John William Coppinger (January 12, 1852 – December 8, 1900) was an American politician and lawyer.

== Biography ==
Coppinger was born in Alton, Illinois. He went to the Alton Public Schools. Coppinger also went to St. Mary's College in Perryville, Missouri and to the University of Notre Dame. He was admitted to the Illinois bar in 1872. Coppinger served as mayor of Alton and was a Democrat. Coppinger served in the Illinois House of Representatives from 1887 to 1889 and in the Illinois Senate from 1891 to 1895. He also served as the United States consul in Toronto, Ontario, Canada. Coppinger died at his home in Alton, Illinois on December 8, 1900 after suffering kidney problems.
