= Christian Hill Historic District =

Historic district in Illinois, United States

- U.S. National Register of Historic Places
- U.S. Historic district
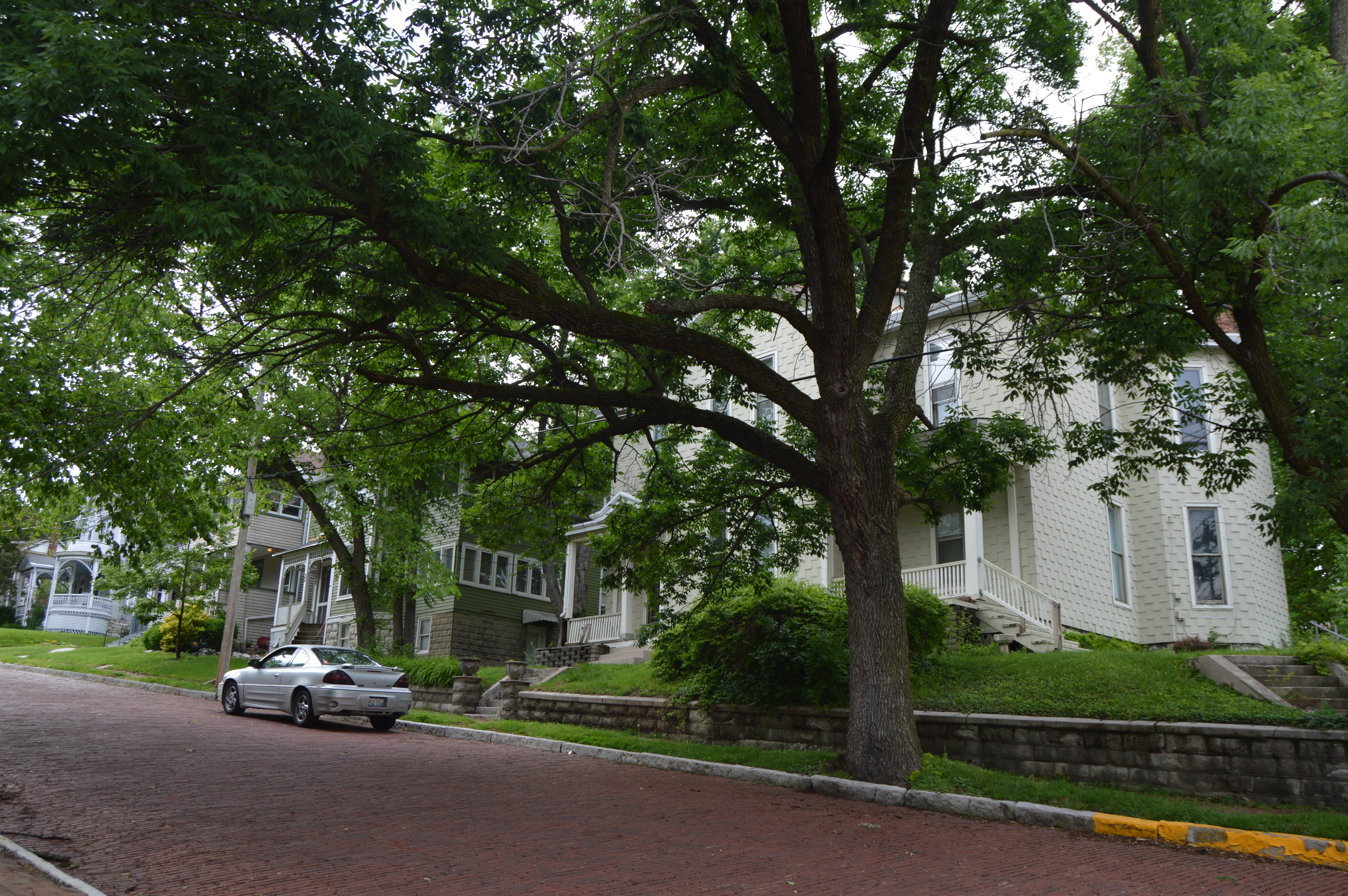
- Northern side of Fourth Street west of William Street

- Location within Illinois Location within the United States
- Location: Roughly bounded by Broadway, Belle, 7th, Cliff, Bluff, and State Sts., Alton, Illinois
- Coordinates: 38°53′42″N 90°11′32″W
- Area: 106 acres (43 ha)
- Architectural style: Italianate, Queen Anne, Federal
- NRHP reference No.: 78001165
- Added to NRHP: May 22, 1978

The Christian Hill Historic District is a historic district and neighborhood in Alton, Illinois. The district is located west of Alton's central business district on a bluff overlooking the Mississippi River. A primarily residential area, the district includes 274 buildings, of which 266 are contributing buildings to its historic character. Development in the district began in the 1830s; in addition to residential development, the Illinois State Prison was constructed in the neighborhood in 1833. While Alton's economy declined during the Panic of 1837, development in the district continued through the early 20th century, and Christian Hill became a desirable neighborhood for Alton residents. The hill acquired its name from, Saints Peter and Paul Church, a Catholic church built in the 1850s which was the cathedral of the Diocese of Alton until the diocese moved to Springfield.

The historic district was added to the National Register of Historic Places on May 22, 1978.
