= Alton Military Prison =

Archaeological site in Illinois, United States

- Alton Military Prison Site
- U.S. National Register of Historic Places
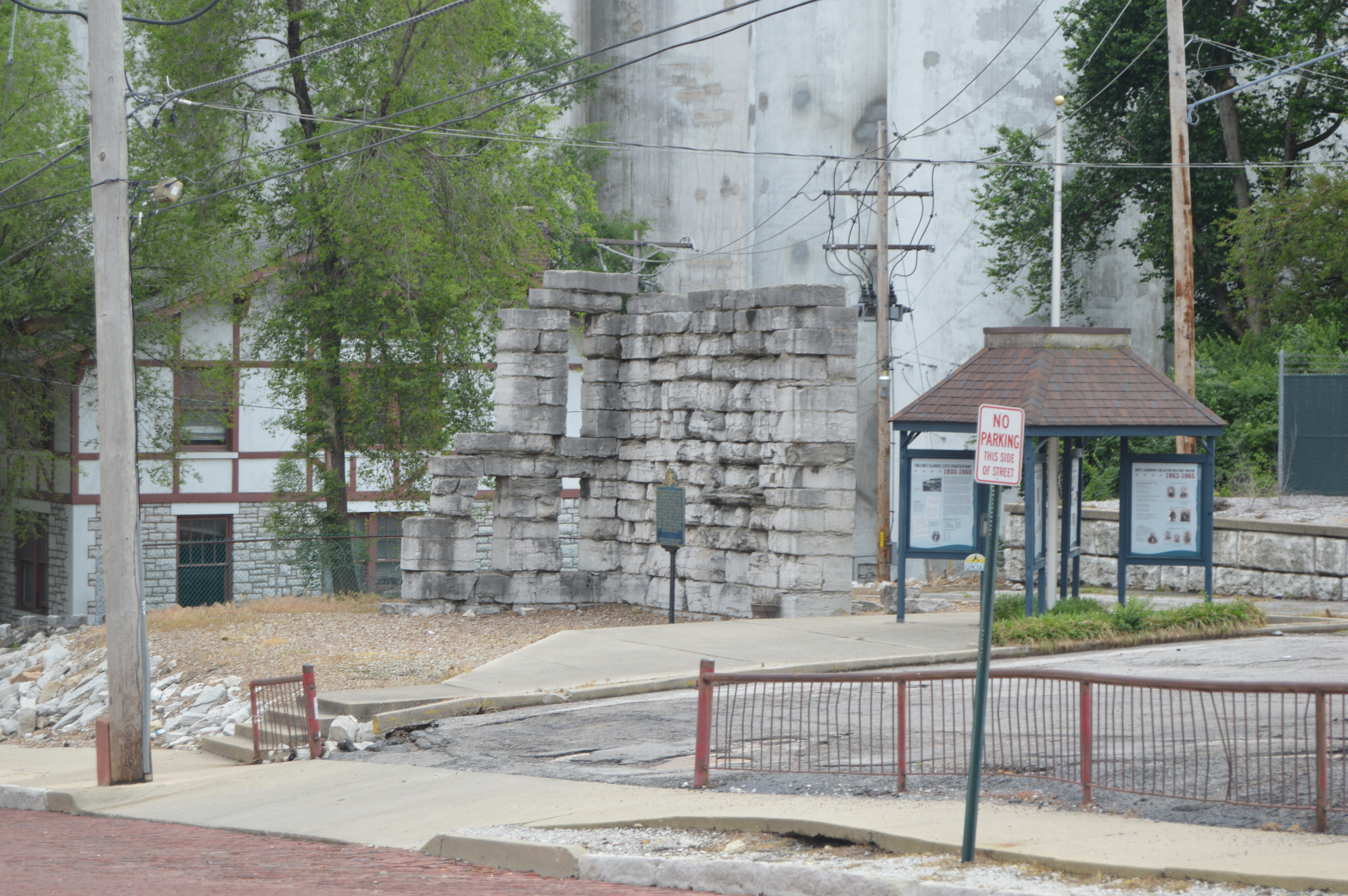
- Overview of the site

- Location within Illinois Location within the United States
- Location: Inside the block bounded by Broadway and William, 4th, and Mill Sts.
- Coordinates: 38°53′30″N 90°11′26″W
- Area: 4 acres (1.6 ha)
- Built: Illinois State Prison (1833)
- NRHP reference No.: 74000766
- Added to NRHP: December 31, 1974

Alton Prison
- Interactive map of Alton Prison
- Location: Alton, Illinois, United States
- Security class: First Illinois state penitentiary and Union prisoner of war camp for detaining military personnel of the Confederate States of America
- Capacity: 1833 (24 cells), 1857 (256 cells), American Civil War 11,000?
- Closed: 1865 and later demolished
- Former name: Illinois State Prison
- Managed by: Illinois Department of Corrections (1833-1857) Union Army (1862-1865)

The Alton Military Prison was a prison located in Alton, Illinois, built in 1833 as the first state penitentiary in Illinois and closed in 1857. During the American Civil War, the prison was reopened in 1862 to accommodate the growing population of Confederate prisoners of war and ceased to be prison at the end of the war in 1865. The prison building was demolished not long after the Civil War. All that remains of the former prison site is a section of ruin wall that is maintained by the State of Illinois as an historic site. The prison site is included in the U.S. National Register of Historic Places.

== History ==
=== Illinois State Penitentiary ===
In 1833, Illinois State Prison in Alton was built as the first state penitentiary in Illinois opening with twenty-four prison cells. In 1857, the prison was closed and replaced by a new state prison in Joliet. At the time of closure the Alton prison had a total of two-hundred-fifty-six cells. Female prisoners were also incarcerated at Alton Penitentiary. From 1835 to 1858 sixty-five women and three thousand men were sentenced to Alton. Female prisoners endured the same degrading conditions as men while their gender exposed them to added indignities and abuses. In 1845 male inspectors claimed that, "One female prisoner is of more trouble than twenty males." Women served, on average, 0.9 years and 47% were pardoned by the governor.

=== American Civil War prison ===
In 1862, the U.S. government reopened the prison to house Confederate prisoners of war during the American Civil War. The prison housed over 11,000 prisoners during the war, including Confederate officer Ebenezer Magoffin. Deaths at the prison were more common than at other Union prisons, and prisoners faced harsh conditions and regular outbreaks of diseases such as smallpox and rubella. 1,534 Confederate soldiers and many Union soldiers and civilians are known to have died at the prison.

== Historic site ==
The Alton prison closed again in 1865 and was later demolished; all that remains of the structure is a section of a wall. The prison site was added to the National Register of Historic Places on December 31, 1974. It is also part of the Christian Hill Historic District, which was listed on the National Register in 1978. The Alton prison site is maintained by the State of Illinois as a state historic site.
