= Nathaniel Buckmaster =

American politician (1787–1855)

Nathaniel Buckmaster (May 1, 1787 – June 1855) was a builder, military officer, sheriff, prison operator, and state legislator in Illinois. Samuel A. Buckmaster who followed him into political office was his nephew. Buckmaster was a Democrat.

He served in the Illinois House of Representatives from 1820 to 1822 and from 1834 to 1836. He was elected Madison County, Illinois’ sheriff in 1821 and served several consecutive terms.

He was a commanding officer in the Black Hawk War. He married Harriet Bartling in 1832 and they had four children.
