= Adrian Buckmaster, 4th Viscount Buckmaster =

British noble

The Right Honourable The Viscount Buckmaster
- Born: 2 February 1949 (age 77)
- Occupation: Businessman
- Employer: Avecia PLC
- Known for: Peer
- Title: 4th Viscount Buckmaster
- Predecessor: Martin Stanley Buckmaster
- Successor: Holder
- Spouse: Elizabeth Mary Mark
- Children: 3
- Parent(s): Hon. Colin John Buckmaster and May Gibbon

Adrian Charles Buckmaster, 4th Viscount Buckmaster (born 2 February 1949) is a British hereditary peer and businessman.

== Early life ==
Buckmaster was born in 1949, the eldest son of Hon Colin John Buckmaster, younger son of Owen Buckmaster, 2nd Viscount Buckmaster and May Gibbon.

He was educated at Charterhouse School, Godalming and at Clare College, Cambridge, graduating in 1970 with a BA, promoted to MA in 1974.

He succeeded to the viscountcy and barony upon the death of his uncle Martin Buckmaster, 3rd Viscount Buckmaster in 2007.

== Career ==
Buckmaster has been chief executive officer of Avecia Group PLC since October 2005 and also chief executive officer of Automotive Products Group Ltd. He has been a Director of Avecia Group since May 2006 and is a Director of Avecia Holdings PLC.

== Interests ==
Buckmaster is a Trustee of the Clare College Boat Club.

== Marriage and children ==
Buckmaster married Elizabeth Mary Mark, daughter of Norman Mark, on 26 July 1975. They have a son and two daughters:

- Hon Clare May Buckmaster (born 1 June 1979)
- Hon Andrew Nicholas Buckmaster (1980 - 10 April 2023), father of Rupert Stanley Buckmaster (born 2015) who is heir apparent to the viscountcy and barony.
- Hon Nicola Mary Buckmaster (born 1986)

== Arms ==
Coat of arms of Adrian Buckmaster, 4th Viscount Buckmaster
Crest A demi-lion Azure holding in the dexter paw a fleur-de-lis and charged on the shoulder with a portcullis both Or. Escutcheon Or semee of fleurs-de-lis Azure a lion rampant of the last on a chief of the second a portcullis of the first. Supporters On either side a bulk Proper each gorged with a chain pendant therefrom a portcullis Or. Motto Equanimitas Magnanimitas (Equanimity, Magnanimity)

Peerage of the United Kingdom
Preceded by Martin Stanley Buckmaster	Viscount Buckmaster; 2007–present	Incumbent
