= Viscount Buckmaster =

Title in the Peerage of the United Kingdom

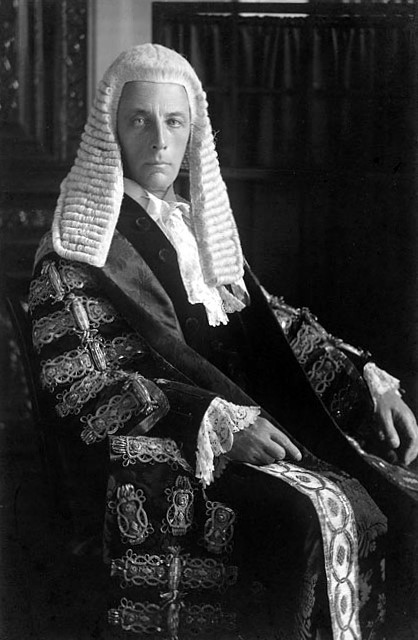
Stanley Buckmaster, 1st Viscount Buckmaster

Viscount Buckmaster, of Cheddington in the County of Buckingham, is a title in the Peerage of the United Kingdom. It was created in 1933 for the lawyer and Liberal politician and former Lord Chancellor, Stanley Buckmaster, 1st Baron Buckmaster. He had already been created Baron Buckmaster, of Cheddington in the County of Buckingham, in 1915, also in the Peerage of the United Kingdom. His grandson, the third Viscount Buckmaster left school to join the British military's Royal Sussex Regiment branch during World War II. In 1940 he received commission and served in the Middle East, he subsequently was granted and honorary rank of Captain, he moved on to new roles in government from 1953. The viscount was appointed an Officer of the Order of the British Empire (OBE) in the 1979 Birthday Honours and was a diplomat working in the foreign office between 1946-1981 working in the middle east and Africa. As of 2017 the titles are held by the latter's nephew, the fourth Viscount, who succeeded in 2007.

The family seat is Ryece Hall, near Ipswich, Suffolk.

== Viscounts Buckmaster (1933) ==
- Stanley Owen Buckmaster, 1st Viscount Buckmaster (1861–1934)
- Owen Stanley Buckmaster, 2nd Viscount Buckmaster (1890–1974)
- Martin Stanley Buckmaster, 3rd Viscount Buckmaster (1921–2007)
- Adrian Charles Buckmaster, 4th Viscount Buckmaster (b. 1949)

The heir apparent is the present holder's grandson, Rupert Stanley Buckmaster (b. 2015)

== Arms ==
Coat of arms of Viscount Buckmaster
| Crest A demi-lion Azure holding in the dexter paw a fleur-de-lis and charged on the shoulder with a portcullis both Or. Escutcheon Or semee of fleurs-de-lis Azure a lion rampant of the last on a chief of the second a portcullis of the first. Supporters On either side a bulk Proper each gorged with a chain pendant therefrom a portcullis Or. Motto Equanimitas Magnanimitas (Equanimity, Magnanimity) |

Viscounts Buckmaster line of succession
- Stanley Owen Buckmaster, 1st Viscount Buckmaster (1861—1934)
  - Owen Stanley Buckmaster, 2nd Viscount Buckmaster (1890—1974)
    - Martin Stanley Buckmaster, 3rd Viscount Buckmaster (1921—2007)
    - Hon. Colin John Buckmaster (1923—2003)
      - Adrian Charles Buckmaster, 4th Viscount Buckmaster (b. 1949)
        - Hon. Andrew Nicholas Buckmaster (1980—2023)
          - (1) Rupert Stanley Buckmaster (b. 2015)
      - (2) Simon John Buckmaster (b. 1956)
        - (3) George John Buckmaster (b. 1984)
        - (4) Hugo Denis Buckmaster (b. 1987)
        - (5) Toby Colin Buckmaster (b. 1991)
      - (3) Michael Anthony Stanley Buckmaster (b. 1959)
