= Alton Steel =

Steel manufacturer

Alton Steel was a steel manufacturer, based in Alton, Illinois, United States. The company was a reincarnation of the Laclede Steel Company, which halted operations of its mill in 1998. The company entered bankruptcy in 2001, but emerged in 2003 with the new name and new owners. The reborn company employed over 260 hourly and 100 salaried workers in the area. The company announced on January 26, 2026 that they would cease operations, laying off 253 workers.

== History ==
Laclede Steel was incorporated in 1911 by Thomas Russell Akin who was succeeded by William Markham Akin who in turn was succeeded by Paul B. Akin (Paul's son Congressman and 2012 Republican Senate nominee Todd Akin was a manager of the company but did not become chairman). It owned two electric-arc furnaces, and owned mills in Alton, Illinois, Fairless Hills, Pennsylvania, Vandalia, Illinois and Benwood, West Virginia. Its products included strip, hot rolled bars, wire, pipe, structural tubing and plate.

Laclede was one of the companies contracted by the Port Authority of New York and New Jersey to supply steel for construction of the World Trade Center in 1967. As a cost-saving measure, the Port Authority chose to use many different, smaller steel suppliers such as Laclede, bidding on smaller portions of steel, rather than buying larger amounts from a single source such as Bethlehem Steel or U.S. Steel.

Working in the steel mill was featured in an episode of Dirty Jobs.

In August 2019, Alton Steel employees took possession of the company through an employee stock ownership plan.

Alton Steel announced on January 26, 2026 that they would cease operations, laying off 253 workers.
