= Martin Buckmaster, 3rd Viscount Buckmaster =

The Right Honourable The Viscount Buckmaster OBE

3rd Viscount Buckmaster
- In office 1974–2007
- Preceded by: Owen Buckmaster
- Succeeded by: Adrian Buckmaster

Personal details
- Born: Martin Stanley Buckmaster; 11 April 1921 Paddington, London, England
- Died: 8 June 2007 (aged 86) London, England
- Resting place: St. Mary's Church, Brettenham
- Party: Crossbencher
- Awards
- Military career
- Allegiance: United Kingdom
- Branch: British Army
- Service years: 1939–1946
- Rank: Captain
- Service number: 143728
- Unit: Royal Sussex Regiment
- Conflicts: World War II

Martin Stanley Buckmaster, 3rd Viscount Buckmaster OBE (11 April 1921 – 8 June 2007) was a British hereditary peer and diplomat. He sat on the crossbenches in the House of Lords from 1974.

== Early life and education ==
Buckmaster was the elder son of Owen Buckmaster, 2nd Viscount Buckmaster, a barrister and Lloyd's underwriter, and his first wife, Joan Simpson. His grandfather was Stanley Buckmaster, 1st Viscount Buckmaster, a barrister and Liberal MP who served as Solicitor General for England and Wales from 1913 to 1915 and was created 1st Viscount Buckmaster in 1915 when he became Lord Chancellor.

He was educated at Stowe School.

== Military service ==
On the outbreak of World War II, Buckmaster joined the Royal Sussex Regiment straight from school. After receiving his commission in August 1940 he served in the Middle East and was granted the honorary rank of Captain when he relinquished his commission in June 1953.

== Career ==
Buckmaster was demobilised in 1946 and joined the Foreign Office, using his experience of the Middle East to good effect. He was a political officer in Abu Dhabi from 1955 to 1958, and then First Secretary at the British embassy in Libya until 1963. After serving in Bahrain, he moved to Kampala to become First Secretary in Uganda from 1969 to 1971. He later served in Beirut and Yemen, retiring in 1981.

He succeeded to the viscountcy and barony upon his father's death in 1974 and took a seat on the crossbenches in the House of Lords. He spoke mainly on matters relating to the Middle East. He was vice-chairman of the Council for the Advancement of Arab-British Understanding. A committed Christian, he also spoke on issues of public morality. He was a member of the Conservative Family Campaign and a patron of the Christian Broadcasting Council.

Buckmaster lost his seat in the House of Lords following the enactment of the House of Lords Act 1999.

== Honours ==
Buckmaster was appointed an Officer of the Order of the British Empire (OBE) in the 1979 Birthday Honours.

== Death ==
Lord Buckmaster died in June 2007 at the age of 86. He was unmarried and was succeeded in the viscountcy and barony by his nephew, Adrian Buckmaster, son of his younger brother, Hon Colin John Buckmaster.

== Arms ==
Coat of arms of Martin Buckmaster, 3rd Viscount Buckmaster
Crest A demi-lion Azure holding in the dexter paw a fleur-de-lis and charged on the shoulder with a portcullis both Or. Escutcheon Or semee of fleurs-de-lis Azure a lion rampant of the last on a chief of the second a portcullis of the first. Supporters On either side a bulk Proper each gorged with a chain pendant therefrom a portcullis Or. Motto Equanimitas Magnanimitas (Equanimity, Magnanimity)

Peerage of the United Kingdom
Preceded by Owen Buckmaster	Viscount Buckmaster; 1974–2007	Succeeded by Adrian Buckmaster
