= Alton Community Unit School District 11 =

Public school district in Alton, Illinois, USA

Coordinates: 38°56′08″N 90°09′29″W

Address
- 1854 East Broadway Alton, Illinois, 62002; United States

District information
- Type: Public school (government funded)
- Grades: PreK-12
- Superintendent: Kristie Baumgartner

Students and staff
- Students: 6788 (2007)

Other information
- Website: Official website

Alton Community Unit School District #11 in Madison County, Illinois, is a public school district consisting of seven elementary schools, one high school, one middle school, an early childhood center, and an alternative education school.

It covers the vast majority of Alton, as well as all of Godfrey and pieces of East Alton and Wood River.

== History ==
The starting salary for a decreed teacher in the district in 1972 was about US$7,500 per year.

In 2006, Alton High School moved to a new facility at the site of the former J.B. Johnson Elementary School and Vocational Center. At the same time, the district's three middle schools, North Middle, West Middle, and East Middle, were merged to form Alton Middle School, which is located at Alton High School's former campus. The entire cost for this project was $57 million

In 2009, Alton High School was recognized as a bronze medal school by U.S. News. Additionally, in 2010, Alton Middle School was designated as an Illinois Horizon School To Watch. Robert Wadlow (tallest man in history) went to this school.

== Current schools ==
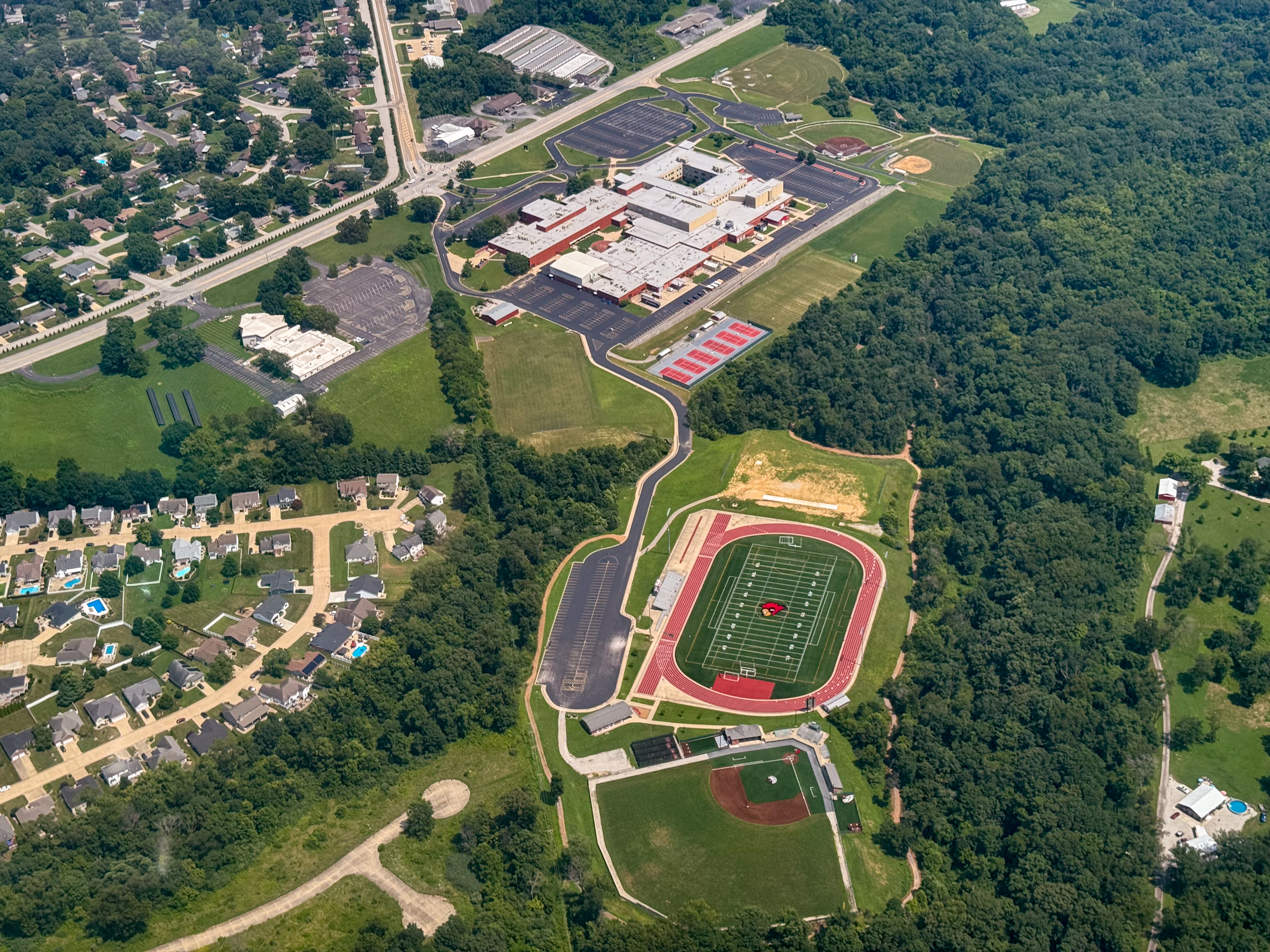
Alton High School

- Alton High School (9-12)
- Alton Middle School (6-8)
- Early Childhood Center (Pre-K)
- East Elementary (3-5)
- Eunice Smith Elementary (K-2)
- Gilson Brown Elementary (K-1)
- Lewis & Clark Elementary (K-1)
- Lovejoy Elementary (K-2)
- Motivational Achievement Center (K-12)(2018, housed at Mark Twain Elementary)
- North Elementary (2-5)
- West Elementary (2-5)

== Former schools ==
- Rufus Easton Grade School
- Fosterburg Grade School
- Central Jr. High School (now Lovejoy Elementary)
- Delmar (duplex 2018)
- Douglas(s)(razed)
- Dunbar (razed)
- Godfrey
- Garfield Grade School (razed)
- Clifton Hill School
- Horace Mann
- Roosevelt High School, then McKinley High School
- Lincoln School (razed)
- Lovejoy (original)(razed)
- Lowell Grade School (razed)
- Humboldt Grade School (Senior apts)
- Clara Barton Public School
- East Middle School (2018 East Elementary)
- Horace Mann Elementary
- Irving School
- James Education Center (later named Motivational Achievement Center/MAC)
- J.B. Johnson Elementary (1 of 2 building)
- J.B. Johnson Vocational Career Center (was part of high school; 2 of 2 buildings)
- Mark Twain School (Reopened in 2018 being used as Motivational Achievement Center)
- McKinley School
- North Middle School (2018 North Elementary)
- Thomas Jefferson Elementary School (now a Senior Recreation Center)
- Union (was formally located where current high school is before J. B. Johnson was built)
- Washington (church 2018)
- West Middle School (2018 West Elementary)
- South Branch (one room school used until early 1960s, razed)
