= Alton, Illinois =

City in the United States

- City
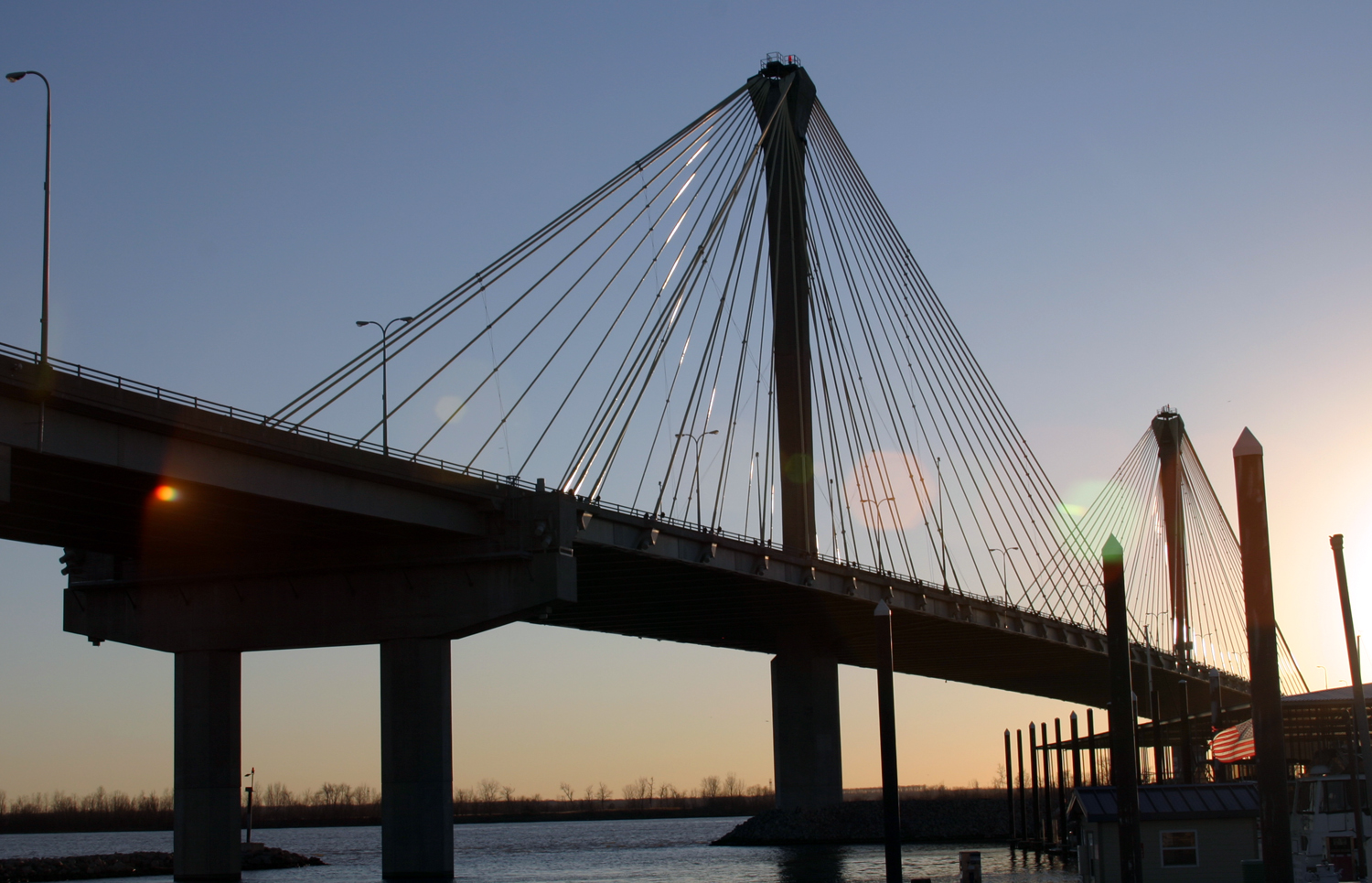
- The Clark Bridge, connecting Alton to West Alton, Missouri

- Flag Seal

- Location of Alton in Madison County, Illinois

- Location within Illinois Location within the United States
- Coordinates: 38°54′2″N 90°9′35″W
- Country: United States
- State: Illinois
- County: Madison
- Established: 1837

Government
  - Mayor: David Goins

Area
  - Total: 16.95 sq mi (43.90 km^{2})
  - Land: 15.67 sq mi (40.59 km^{2})
  - Water: 1.28 sq mi (3.31 km^{2})
- Elevation: 535 ft (163 m)

Population (2020)
  - Total: 25,676
  - Density: 1,638.5/sq mi (632.62/km^{2})
- Time zone: UTC-6 (CST)
  - Summer (DST): UTC-5 (CDT)
- ZIP Code: 62002
- Area code: 618
- FIPS code: 17-01114
- GNIS feature ID: 2393935
- Wikimedia Commons: Alton, Illinois
- Website: cityofaltonil.gov

Alton (/ˈɔːltən/ AWL-tən) is a city on the Mississippi River in Madison County, Illinois, United States, about 18 miles (29 km) north of St. Louis, Missouri. Its population was 25,676 at the 2020 census. It is a part of the River Bend area in the Metro-East region of the Greater St. Louis metropolitan area.

It is well known for its limestone bluffs along the river north of the city, and it is the former location of an historical state penitentiary and played a significant role preceding and during the American Civil War. It was the site of the last Abraham Lincoln and Stephen Douglas debate in October 1858. The former state penitentiary in Alton was used during the Civil War to hold up to 12,000 Confederate prisoners of war.

== History ==
Although Alton once was growing faster than the nearby city of St. Louis, a coalition of St. Louis businessmen planned to build a competing town to stop Alton's expansion and bring business to St. Louis. The resulting town was Grafton, Illinois.

Many blocks of housing in Alton were built in the Victorian Queen Anne style. They represent a prosperous period in the river city's history. At the top of the hill in the commercial area, several stone churches and a fine city hall also represent the city's wealth during its good times based on river traffic, manufacturing, and shipping. It was a commercial center for a large agricultural area. Numerous residences on hills have sweeping views of the Mississippi River.

=== Early history ===
The Alton area was home to Native Americans for thousands of years before the 19th-century founding by European Americans of the modern city. Historic accounts indicate occupation of this area by the Illinois Confederation at the time of European contact. Earlier native settlement is demonstrated by archaeological artifacts and the famous prehistoric Piasa bird painted on a cliff face nearby. The image was described in 1673 by French missionary priest Father Jacques Marquette.

=== 19th century ===
Alton was developed as a river town in January 1818 by Rufus Easton, who named it after his son. Easton ran a passenger ferry service across the Mississippi River to the Missouri shore. Alton is located amid the confluence of three navigable rivers, the Illinois, Mississippi, and Missouri. Alton grew into a river trading town with an industrial character. The city rises steeply from the waterfront, where massive concrete grain silos and railroad tracks were constructed in the 19th and 20th centuries to store and ship the area's grains and produce. Brick commercial buildings are spread throughout downtown. Once the site of several brick factories, Alton has an unusually high number of streets still paved in brick. The lower levels of Alton are subject to floods, many of which have inundated the historic downtown area. The dates of different flood levels are marked on the large grain silos, part of the Ardent Mills, near the Argosy Casino at the waterfront. The flood of 1993 is considered the worst of the last century.

Alton became an important town for abolitionists, as Illinois was a free state, separated from the slave state of Missouri only by the Mississippi River. Proslavery activists also lived there, and slave catchers often raided the city. Escaped slaves would cross the river to seek shelter in Alton and proceed to safer places through stations of the Underground Railroad. During the years before the American Civil War, several homes were equipped with tunnels and hiding places for stations on the Underground Railroad to aid slaves escaping to the North. On November 7, 1837, abolitionist printer Reverend Elijah P. Lovejoy was murdered by a proslavery mob while he tried to protect his Alton-based press from being destroyed for the third time. He had moved from St. Louis because of opposition there. He had printed many abolitionist tracts and distributed them throughout the area. When one of the mob made a move to set the old warehouse on fire, Lovejoy, armed with only a pistol, went outside to try to stop him. The proslavery man shot him dead (with a shotgun, five rounds through the midsection). The mob stormed the warehouse and threw Lovejoy's printing press into the Mississippi. Lovejoy thus became the first martyr of the abolition movement.

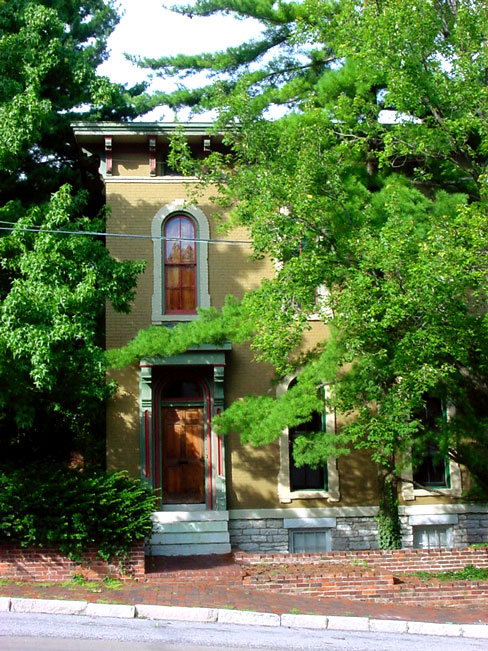
Historic Alton home

Alton became the seat of a diocese of the Catholic Church in 1857. Its first bishop was French-born Henry Damian Juncker. The new diocese had 58 churches, 18 priests, and 50,000 Catholics. When he died, 11 years later, the churches were 125, the priests more than 100, and the Catholics 80,000. He was succeeded by Peter Joseph Baltes from Germany (1869–1886) and James Ryan (1888–1923). In 1923, the bishop's seat was moved to Springfield, Illinois. The Diocese of Alton, no longer a residential bishopric, is today listed by the Catholic Church as a titular see. Titular bishops appointed to the see have been John Clayton Nienstedt, and Josu Iriondo.

On October 15, 1858, Alton was the site of the seventh Lincoln-Douglas debate. A memorial at the site in downtown Alton features oversized statues of Lincoln and Douglas, as they would have appeared during the debate. Congressional representatives came to Alton when they drafted the Thirteenth Amendment of the Constitution, to permanently end slavery throughout the Union. Alton resident and US Senator Lyman Trumbull, chairman of the Senate Judiciary Committee, co-wrote the Thirteenth Amendment. His Alton home, the Lyman Trumbull House, is a national historic monument.

Just two weeks into the Civil War, Alton played a role in the infamous Camp Jackson Affair, which led to the eviction of Missouri Governor Claiborne Fox Jackson from office. The State of Missouri's neutrality was tested in a conflict over the St. Louis Arsenal. The federal government reinforced the arsenal's tiny garrison with several detachments, including a force from the 2nd Infantry under Captain Nathaniel Lyon. Concerned by widespread reports that Governor Jackson intended to use the Missouri Volunteer Militia to attack the arsenal and capture its 39,000 small arms, Secretary of War Simon Cameron ordered Lyon (by that time in acting command) to evacuate the majority of the arms to Illinois. About 21,000 guns were secretly evacuated to Alton on the evening of April 29, 1861.

The first penitentiary in Illinois was built in Alton. While only a corner of it within a few blocks of the river remains, it once extended nearly to "Church Hill". During the Civil War, Union forces used it to hold prisoners of war, and some 12,000 Confederates were held there. During the smallpox epidemic of 1863–1864, an estimated 1500–2200 men died. A Confederate mass grave on the north side of Alton holds many of the dead from the epidemic, and a memorial marks the site. Often, when Confederate prisoners escaped, they tried to cross the Mississippi River back to the split state of Missouri.

=== 20th century ===
Alton native Robert Pershing Wadlow, listed in the Guinness Book of Records as the world's tallest man at 8 feet 11.1 inches tall, 2.72 m, is buried in Oakwood Cemetery in the area known as Upper Alton. The earth over his grave was raised so visitors can compare its length to other graves. A memorial to him, including a life-sized statue and a replica of his chair, stands on College Avenue, across from the Southern Illinois University Dental School (formerly Shurtleff College).

The Sisters of St Francis of the Martyr St George have their American province motherhouse in Alton.

In 1937, two commercial fishermen from Alton caught a bull shark in the Mississippi River. Late that summer, they had realized something was troubling their wood and mesh traps. Concluding that it was a fish, they built a strong wire trap and baited it with chicken guts. The next morning, they caught the 5-foot, 84-pound shark, which they displayed in the Calhoun Fish Market, where it attracted crowds for days.

World War II had a group of seven brothers join the military and variously became decorated veterans. Among these were Millard Glen Gray, who was decorated by Douglas MacArthur, and Neil Gray, who received the Silver Star.

In 1954, the city of Alton was named as one of three finalists for the location of the new United States Air Force Academy. Alton lost to the winning site of Colorado Springs, Colorado.

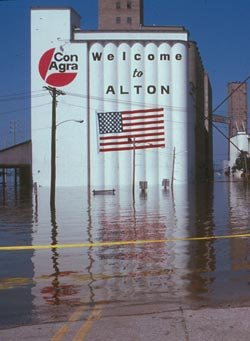
Alton flood, 1993

Because of Alton's location at the Mississippi River, the Great Flood of 1993 with its high water levels caused severe damage to the city. Alton's water supply was cut off due to flooding, and townspeople had to be supplied with bottled water for more than three weeks. Many local businesses, including Anheuser-Busch of St. Louis, donated funds to help the people of Alton.

The original bridge connecting Alton with West Alton, Missouri, with only one lane in each direction, had become a hazard for motorists and a hindrance for emergency vehicles. The northernmost bridge in the St. Louis metropolitan area, it was torn down in the 1990s. The current Clark Bridge, with two lanes of divided traffic in each direction, plus two bike lanes, opened in 1994. Work had proceeded during the Great Flood of 1993. The award-winning, cable-stayed design was done by Hanson Engineers of Springfield, Illinois. Pieces of cables identical to those of the bridge were handed out in educational settings all over the city to allow the city's children to "take home a piece of the bridge". The complex work of construction of the bridge, in which engineers had to deal with the strong river current, barge traffic, and the 1993 flood, was featured in the documentary Super Bridge on Nova.

=== 21st century ===
In 2021, voters in the city elected David Goins as Alton's first black mayor.

== Geography ==
Alton is located on the Mississippi River above the mouth of the Missouri River. Most of Alton is located on bluffs overlooking the river valley. The Meeting of the Great Rivers National Scenic Byway runs along the Alton riverfront. A monument and observatory tower, Confluence Tower, located next to the confluence of the Missouri and Mississippi Rivers in neighboring Hartford, Illinois, has been constructed to provide an overview of the Great Rivers area. This point also marks the beginning of the famous Lewis and Clark Expedition. Also on the river at Alton is Lock and Dam 26, the newest and busiest lock and dam complex on the main channel of the Mississippi River. Adjacent to it on the Illinois side is the National Great Rivers Museum, which features tours of the dam itself several times per day. On the Missouri side, the Audubon Center at Riverlands, is one of the best places in the world to view birds, as it lies near where the Mississippi Flyway merges the flight paths of the Mississippi, Illinois, and Missouri Rivers. Also adjacent to the Audubon Center is the Jones-Confluence Point State Park, where one can stand at the confluence of the Missouri and Mississippi Rivers.

According to the 2021 census gazetteer files, Alton has a total area of 16.96 square miles (43.93 km^{2}), of which 15.68 square miles (40.61 km^{2}) (or 92.45%) is land and 1.28 square miles (3.32 km^{2}) (or 7.55%) is water.

The National Great Rivers Museum is located at the new Lock and Dam No. 26, or Melvin Price Locks and Dam. The lock and dam are open for tours. The lock is a favorite spot to watch bald eagles, which feed on fish coming up in waters below the dam. A large bird sanctuary is located in an area of floodplain and wetlands on the west side of the river.

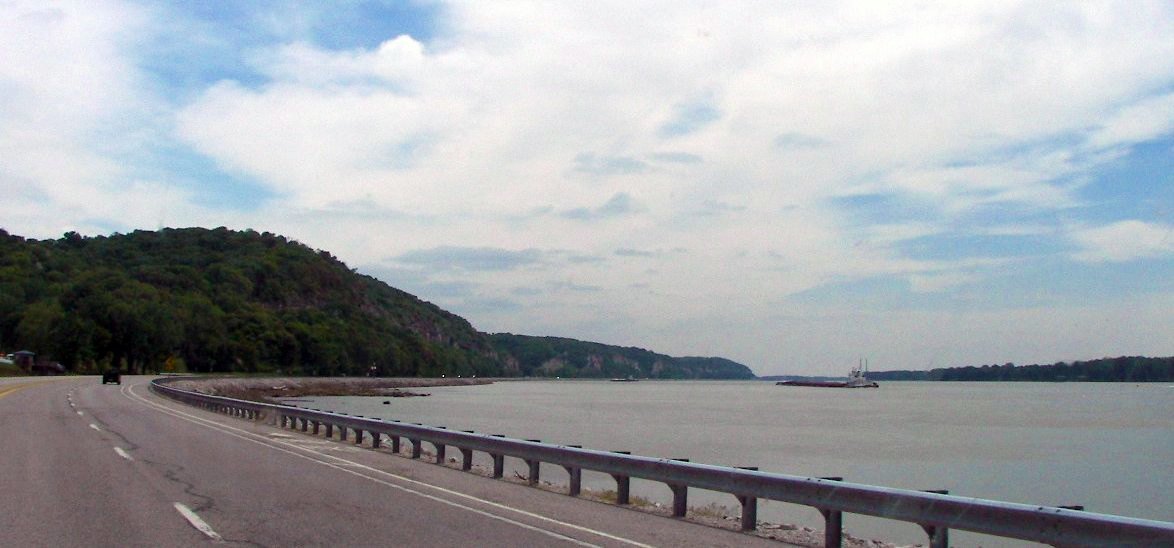
The Great River Road in Illinois north of Alton, looking south

The River Road goes right next to the river north to Grafton. Above that, it is often routed inland of the floodplain. It provides views of the dramatic contrast between the high cliffs of the Illinois side to the broad, flat, green agricultural countryside of Portage des Sioux, Missouri. The Great River Road is a popular bicycle touring route. Hidden in a notch of the cliff is the tiny village of Elsah, once a down-and-dirty, liquor-soaked tugboaters' retreat, now with renovated properties and antique shops in historic houses.

=== Climate ===
Climate data for Alton, Illinois (1991–2020 normals, extremes 1943–present)
Month	Jan	Feb	Mar	Apr	May	Jun	Jul	Aug	Sep	Oct	Nov	Dec	Year
Record high °F (°C)	77 (25)	76 (24)	89 (32)	102 (39)	98 (37)	107 (42)	116 (47)	106 (41)	103 (39)	98 (37)	88 (31)	74 (23)	116 (47)
Mean daily maximum °F (°C)	39.5 (4.2)	43.7 (6.5)	53.5 (11.9)	66.1 (18.9)	75.0 (23.9)	83.7 (28.7)	87.3 (30.7)	86.0 (30.0)	80.1 (26.7)	67.9 (19.9)	54.3 (12.4)	43.5 (6.4)	65.0 (18.3)
Daily mean °F (°C)	30.3 (−0.9)	34.5 (1.4)	44.1 (6.7)	55.6 (13.1)	65.6 (18.7)	74.6 (23.7)	78.3 (25.7)	76.6 (24.8)	70.0 (21.1)	57.9 (14.4)	45.4 (7.4)	35.3 (1.8)	55.7 (13.2)
Mean daily minimum °F (°C)	21.7 (−5.7)	25.2 (−3.8)	34.7 (1.5)	45.2 (7.3)	56.1 (13.4)	65.6 (18.7)	69.3 (20.7)	67.3 (19.6)	59.8 (15.4)	48.0 (8.9)	36.5 (2.5)	27.1 (−2.7)	46.4 (8.0)
Record low °F (°C)	−16 (−27)	−15 (−26)	−1 (−18)	20 (−7)	32 (0)	44 (7)	50 (10)	46 (8)	37 (3)	25 (−4)	4 (−16)	−16 (−27)	−16 (−27)
Average precipitation inches (mm)	2.53 (64)	2.52 (64)	3.46 (88)	4.92 (125)	5.46 (139)	3.40 (86)	3.95 (100)	3.30 (84)	3.38 (86)	2.93 (74)	3.43 (87)	2.59 (66)	41.87 (1,063)
Average precipitation days (≥ 0.01 in)	7.2	7.8	9.9	10.3	11.3	8.2	7.3	7.0	6.8	7.6	8.2	7.7	99.3
Source: NOAA

== Demographics ==
Historical population
Census	Pop.	Note	%±
1840	2,340		—
1850	3,585		53.2%
1860	6,332		76.6%
1870	8,665		36.8%
1880	8,975		3.6%
1890	10,294		14.7%
1900	14,210		38.0%
1910	17,528		23.3%
1920	24,682		40.8%
1930	30,151		22.2%
1940	31,255		3.7%
1950	32,550		4.1%
1960	43,047		32.2%
1970	39,700		−7.8%
1980	34,171		−13.9%
1990	32,905		−3.7%
2000	30,496		−7.3%
2010	27,865		−8.6%
2020	25,676		−7.9%
U.S. Decennial Census 2020

=== Racial and ethnic composition ===
Alton, Illinois – Racial and ethnic composition Note: the US Census treats Hispanic/Latino as an ethnic category. This table excludes Latinos from the racial categories and assigns them to a separate category. Hispanics/Latinos may be of any race.
Race / Ethnicity (NH = Non-Hispanic)	Pop 2000	Pop 2010	Pop 2020	% 2000	% 2010	% 2020
White alone (NH)	21,825	18,785	16,210	71.57%	67.41%	63.13%
Black or African American alone (NH)	7,504	7,375	6,849	24.61%	26.47%	26.67%
Native American or Alaska Native alone (NH)	53	53	101	0.17%	0.19%	0.39%
Asian alone (NH)	112	138	170	0.37%	0.50%	0.66%
Native Hawaiian or Pacific Islander alone (NH)	2	3	10	0.01%	0.01%	0.04%
Other race alone (NH)	79	26	135	0.26%	0.09%	0.53%
Mixed race or Multiracial (NH)	467	949	1,524	1.53%	3.41%	5.94%
Hispanic or Latino (any race)	454	536	677	1.49%	1.92%	2.64%
Total	30,496	27,865	25,676	100.00%	100.00%	100.00%

=== 2020 census ===
As of the 2020 census there were 25,676 people, 11,325 households, and 6,257 families residing in the city. The population density was 1,513.83 inhabitants per square mile (584.49/km^{2}). There were 12,995 housing units at an average density of 766.17 per square mile (295.82/km^{2}). Of those 12,995 housing units, which 13.6% were vacant. The homeowner vacancy rate was 3.2% and the rental vacancy rate was 10.5%. The racial makeup of the city was 63.79% White, 26.76% African American, 0.48% Native American, 0.68% Asian, 0.04% Pacific Islander, 1.15% from other races, and 7.09% from two or more races. Hispanic or Latino of any race were 2.64% of the population.

There were 11,325 households, out of which 30.0% had children under the age of 18 living with them, 31.33% were married couples living together, 19.68% had a female householder with no husband present, and 44.75% were non-families. 35.64% of all households were made up of individuals, and 14.98% had someone living alone who was 65 years of age or older. The average household size was 3.00 and the average family size was 2.29.

The city's age distribution consisted of 24.3% under the age of 18, 7.0% from 18 to 24, 27.5% from 25 to 44, 24.7% from 45 to 64, and 16.6% who were 65 years of age or older. The median age was 38.1 years. For every 100 females, there were 91.9 males. For every 100 females age 18 and over, there were 87.9 males.

The median income for a household in the city was $43,291, and the median income for a family was $55,228. Males had a median income of $37,582 versus $25,821 for females. The per capita income for the city was $24,943. About 21.2% of families and 25.5% of the population were below the poverty line, including 35.8% of those under age 18 and 15.8% of those age 65 or over.

Racial composition as of the 2020 census
Race	Number	Percent
White	16,380	63.8%
Black or African American	6,872	26.8%
American Indian and Alaska Native	123	0.5%
Asian	174	0.7%
Native Hawaiian and other Pacific Islander	11	0.0%
Some other race	295	1.1%
Two or more races	1,821	7.1%

== Government ==
Mayors of Alton, Illinois

Image	Mayor	Years	Notes
	John M. Krum	1837–1838	Died 1883
	Charles Howard	1838–1839	Challenged by W.S. Gilman and won 234–225. Died 1872
	John King	1839 (three months)	Resigned after three months in office
	William Pinckard Sr.	1839–1840	Died 1866
	Stephen Griggs	1840–1841	
	William Martin	1841–1842	Died 1918
	Samuel Bailey	1842–1843	Died 1846
	Stephen Pierson	1843–1844	
	George T. M. Davis	1844–1846	Died 1888
	George Brown	1846–1847	Died 1880
	Edward Keating	1847–1848	Died 1857
	Robert Ferguson	1848–1849	
	Samuel Wade (1st term)	1849–1851	Died 1885
	Henry Billings	1851–1852	Died 1870
	Thomas Hope	1852–1853	Died 1885
	Samuel A. Buckmaster (1st term)	1853–1854	Challenged incumbent Thomas Hope and won 483–189. Died 1878
	O.M. Adams	1854–1855	
	Samuel Wade (2nd term)	1855–1856	Died 1885
	Joseph Brown	1856–1857	Died 1899
	Samuel Wade (3rd term)	1857–1858	Died 1885
	Lyne Metcalf	1858–1859	Ran against Dan'l Ryan and John Mullady; won with 531 votes to Ryan’s 351 and Mullady’s 145. Died 1906
	William Post	1859–1860	Died 1897
	Lewis Kellenberger	1860–1862	Died 1878
	Samuel A. Buckmaster (2nd term)	1862–1863	Died 1878
	Edward Hollister	1863–1866	Died 1905
	William Post	1866–1867	Died 1897
	Silas Farber	1867–1868	
	James Drummond	1868–1872	Died 1897
	Lucas Pfeiffenberger (1st term)	1872–1873	Died 1918
	Charles Calwell	1873–1874	Died 1877
	Lucas Pfeiffenberger (2nd term)	1874–1875	Died 1918
	Alexander Hope	1875–1878	Lost the 1877 election to Theodore Fries, but the court ruled the election invalid. Died 1922
	Lucas Pfeiffenberger (3rd term)	1878–1879	Died 1918
	Henry Bruggemann (1st term)	1879–1881	Died 1917
	Lucas Pfeiffenberger (4th term)	1881–1883	Died 1918
	Charles Herb	1883–1885	Died 1893
	John Coppinger	1885–1887	Challenged by future mayor Henry McPike and won 972–755. Died 1900
	Henry McPike	1887–1891	Challenged by future mayor Frederick Joesting and won 1,061–836. Died 1910
	Frederick Joesting	1891–1893	Died 1903
	John J. Brenholt	1893–1895	Died 1934
	Henry Bruggemann (2nd term)	1895–1897; 1897–1899	Died 1917
	Anthony Young	1899–1903	Died 1948
	Henry Bruggemann (3rd term)	1903–1905	Died 1917
	Edmond Beall (1st term)	1905–1911	Died 1920
	Joseph Faulstich	1911–1915	Died 1940
	Edmond Beall (2nd term)	1915–1917	Died 1920
	William Sauvage	1917–1921	Died 1938
	Stephen Crawford	1921–1923	Died 1941
	John Elble	1923–1925	Died 1927
	George T. Davis	1925–1927	Died 1935
	Thomas Butler	1927–1931	Died 1991
	John Brenholt	1931–1933	Died 1938
	Thomas Butler	1933–1935	Died 1991
	Otto Hoffman	1935–1937	Died 1938
	Leo Struif	1937–1945	Died 1966
	Harold Wadlow	1945–1949	Father of Robert Wadlow. Died 1969
	Earl Linkogle	1949–1953	Died 1972
	Leo Struif	1953–1957	Died 1966
	Phillmer Day	1957–1965	Died 1983
	Clyde Wiseman, Jr.	1965–1969	Died 2011
	Paul Lenz	1969–1985	Defeated then-Mayor Clyde Wiseman 6,346–3,779. Died 2010
	Bert Wuellner	1985–1989	Defeated longtime Mayor Paul Lenz 2,900–2,671. Died 1990
	Ed Voumard, Jr.	1989–1993	Died 1999
	Bob Towse	1993–1997	Faced four challengers (incumbent Ed Voumard, Jr., future mayor Donald Sandidge, Peter Sasek, and Richard Harner). Won with 2,639 votes (Sandidge 2,589; Harner 1,593; Voumard 1,183; Sasek 190)
	Donald Sandidge	1997–2009	Died 2013
	Tom Hoechst	2009–2013	
	Brant Walker	2013–2021	Won 2013 election as a write-in candidate against Tom Hoechst, 1,853–1,779
	David Goins	2021–present	Defeated incumbent Brant Walker 2,021–1,625

== Economy ==
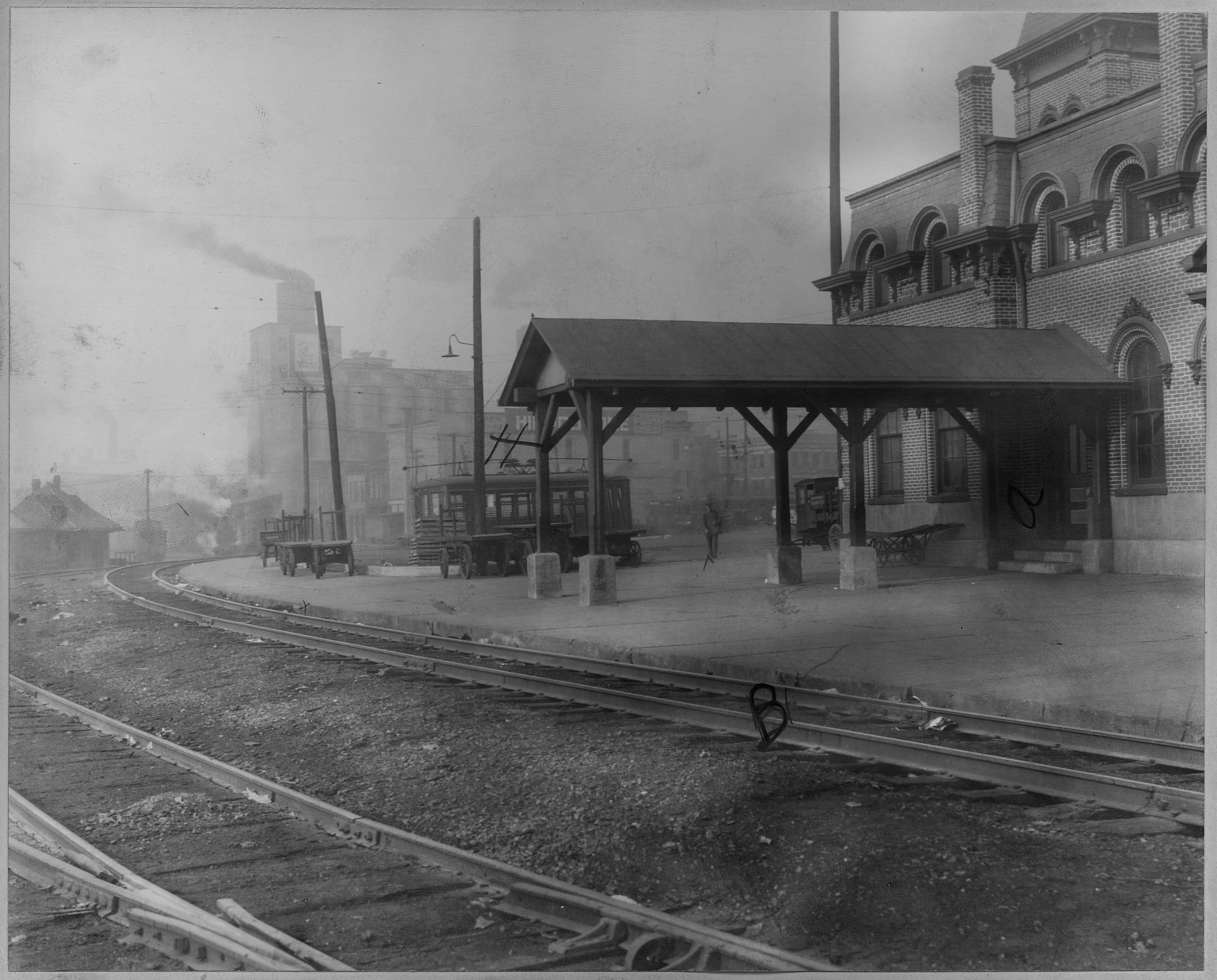
Railroad station in Alton, 1925

In the late 19th and 20th centuries, Alton became a town of heavy industry and manufacturing. Laclede Steel established major steel manufacturing operations in the town. Local industry also includes Cope Plastics and Hanley Industries. Alton was home to once-thriving, now defunct, industries such as the Owens-Illinois Glass Bottle Works and Alton Box Board Company (a maker of all types of cardboard boxes for all types of uses).

Restructuring in the industry in the mid-20th century led Alton to create a new future. It has facilities for corporate and vacation retreats, and it has transitioned into a popular tourist destination. Alton's location and historical heritage make it a popular destination for antique shopping, touring historic areas, and gambling aboard the Argosy Casino. Other Greater Alton attractions include Alton Marina; nine golf courses, including Spencer T. Olin, the only Arnold Palmer-designed and -managed course in Illinois or the St. Louis metropolitan area; fine dining and night life; and a large selection of bed-and-breakfast and guest houses, as well as the Alton Square Mall.

Some visitors come to explore the natural environment of the area. A designated bikeway extends for miles north of town along the Mississippi River and below the limestone bluffs; its relatively flat grade and passage through tree-shaded areas make it an easy ride for families. During the migration seasons, Alton is a destination for birdwatchers along the Mississippi Flyway; winter visitors come to see the bald eagles that roost on the Illinois limestone bluffs and feed on fish in the river. It is the area of the Meeting of the Great Rivers National Scenic Byway. A few miles to the north is Père Marquette State Park, with a WPA-era lodge and attractions including trails for hikers and riders, and horses for hire.

On January 28, 2010, Illinois was selected for a $1.2 billion federal award to bring high-speed passenger rail service to Illinois by 2015–2017. Alton has been selected as a station stop on a line running from St. Louis to Chicago, and opened on September 13, 2017.

Alton won the Small Business Revolution: Main Street contest and got a $100,000 boost to its community.

== Arts and culture ==
=== Arts ===
Alton is home to the Jacoby Arts Center (JAC) (formerly the Madison County Arts Council), a not-for-profit organization that supports local arts and art education and is partially funded by the Illinois Arts Council. The JAC is a regional arts center, serving 17 counties throughout south central Illinois, providing a public art gallery, art classes in a variety of media for adults and children, strong performing arts programming including a monthly live music performance, and an outlet to the literary arts, through such programs as the "Poetry Out Loud" high school-level competition and support of the Alton Writers Guild.

Alton is also home to the Alton Symphony Orchestra As of 2011, it was in its 66th season, and is considered one of the premier community orchestras in the Midwest. Musicians range from teens to senior citizens. It holds four regular-season concerts, a stylish pops concert, and a children's concert; the symphony offers performances to entertain and educate diverse sectors of the community.

=== Theater ===
Founded in 1934 as a community theater, the Alton Little Theater continues to produce a full season of dramatic and comedic plays and musicals. Its all-volunteer members bring quality theater productions to Alton in an intimate setting. The Alton high schools all offer theatrical productions throughout the school year, as well.

Alton Children's Theater, founded in 1958 by Solveig Sullivan, has provided live theater for children through the years. The plays are now held at Lewis and Clark Community College's Hatheway Hall. For many years, the company has performed for up to 10,000 children annually. This all-volunteer membership hires a professional director, who works with the members for the annual week of performances.

=== Landmarks ===
The massive Lovejoy monument, dedicated to free speech and the abolition of slavery

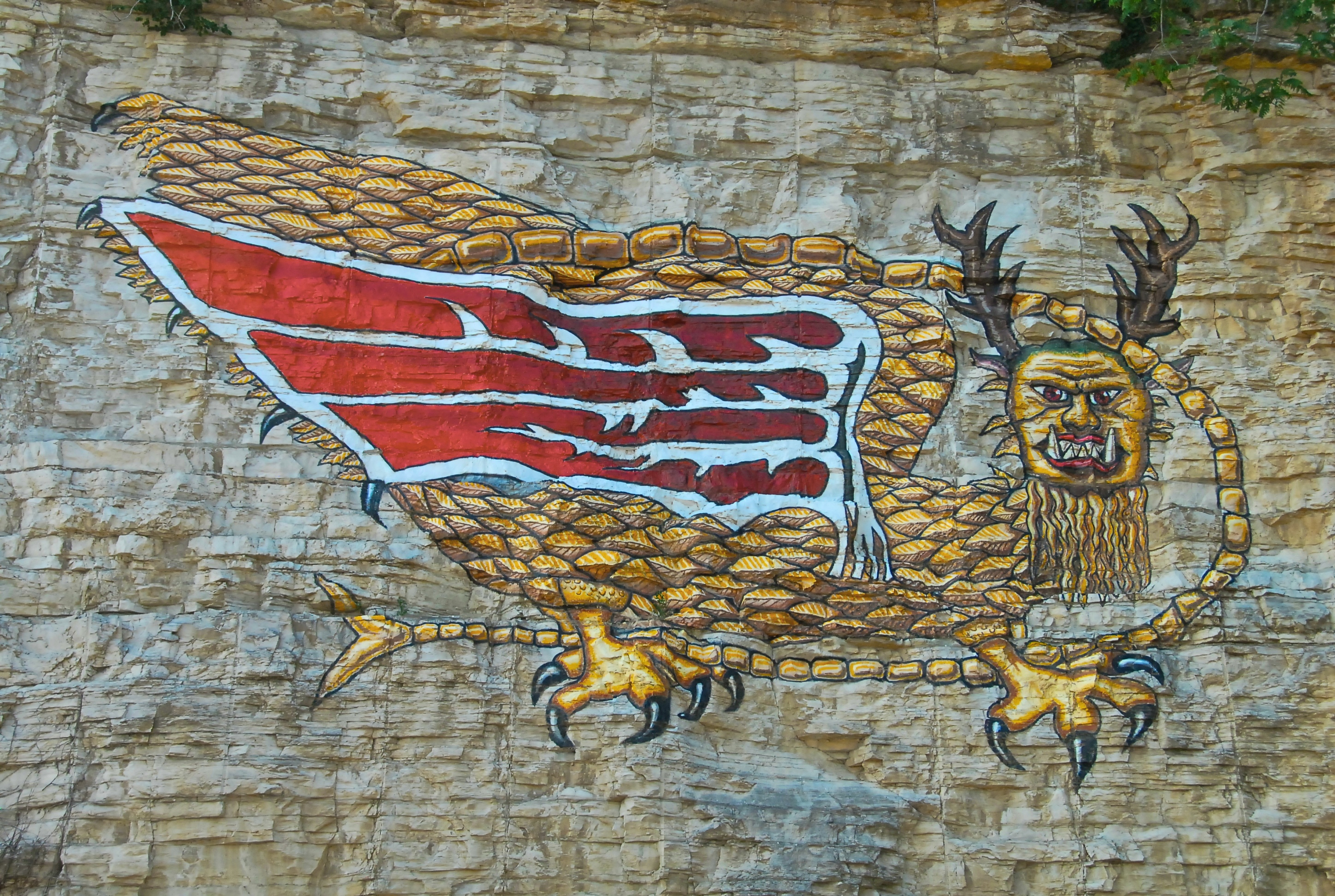
The cliffside reproduction of the American Indian mural, the Piasa Bird

- The Piasa Bird painting, reproduction of original on the face of a cliff north-west of the city.
- Elijah P. Lovejoy Monument, a 110-foot-tall memorial to the famous abolitionist and free-speech advocate who was murdered by a proslavery mob. The monument is in Alton Cemetery on the bluffs.
- A monument to 1354 Confederate soldiers who died in the Alton prison, at the North Alton Confederate Cemetery
- The Franklin House, later known as the Lincoln Hotel, is now the Lincoln Lofts. Lincoln dined here and may have stayed overnight when in Alton for his seventh debate with Stephen Douglas on October 15, 1858. Statues of Lincoln and Douglas mark Lincoln Douglas Square, at the corner of Landmarks and Broadway. This was the site of their last debate before the 1858 Illinois Senatorial Election.
- The Beall Mansion, designed by notable architect Lucas Pfeiffenberger, was built in 1902 and 1903. It has been the private residence of Edmond Beall, four-time mayor of Alton and state senator.
- St. Peter and Paul Roman Catholic Church, more than 150 years old, served as the Cathedral of the Diocese of Alton under three bishops (1857 to 1923). In 1923, the cathedral seat of the diocese was moved from Alton to Springfield.
- First Unitarian Church, located at 110 E. Third Street, was built upon the foundation of St. Matthew's Catholic Church, which had previously burned in the 1850s; it is one of Alton's most popular ghost-hunting sites. The church is supposedly haunted by former pastor Philip Mercer who committed suicide on November 20, 1934, within the church. It was also a popular stop on the Underground Railroad during the Civil War.
- The Mineral Springs Hotel, located at 301 East Broadway, was opened in 1914 due to the natural spring located on the property. During its heyday in 1918, Hollywood actress Marie Dressler spoke at the hotel on behalf of the Liberty Loan committee. The hotel closed in 1971, and became an outlet mall in 1978; it has been in operation ever since. It is also considered to be one of the most haunted places in the city, drawing ghosts hunters from all around the U.S.
- A statue of Robert Pershing Wadlow, the tallest fully documented man in the recorded history of the world
- The cable-stayed Clark Bridge (1994)
- Meeting of the Rivers National Scenic Byway, runs through the city adjacent to its Riverfront Park.
- Argosy Casino Alton, owned by Penn National Gaming
- National Great Rivers Museum includes daily tours of Melvin Price Locks and Dam, the newest and busiest lock and dam complex on the main channel of the Mississippi River.
- Audubon Center at Riverlands, on the south side of the Melvin Price Locks and Dam, includes a small museum and is a well-known spot for birding enthusiasts.
- Alton Riverfront Amphitheater, in Alton's Riverfront Park, has views of the Mississippi River, Clark Bridge and Alton Marina.

== Education ==
Alton Community Unit School District 11 covers the vast majority of the city, while a small section in the east is in the Bethalto Consolidated Unit School District 8.

Based on 2006 district data, Alton SD 11 enrollment stood at 6,480; the average number of teaching years in the district is 13.5; the high-school graduation rate is 97.7%; the elementary pupil-teacher ratio is 18.9; and the secondary pupil-teacher ratio is 22.3. The Alton High School has an award-winning math team and music program. Alton High School offers an honors program.

Alton High School is the new public school, complete with a three-court gymnasium and six tennis courts.

The Alton Middle School is housed in the old Alton High School complex. Alton Middle School serves grades 6–8. The school is made up of three buildings - the main building, annex, and Olin Building. The main building is the oldest and is of architectural interest for its Romanesque design. Alton Middle School is the largest middle school in Illinois, with about 1,500 students.

The school system has a student program for first through eighth grades, covering the Middle School. This program gives participating students access to wider knowledge and special projects.

Marquette Catholic High School, named after French explorer Father Jacques Marquette, serves the area, as well. Its sports teams are called the Explorers.

Alton was home to Shurtleff College from 1827 to 1957 and prominent military preparatory school Western Military Academy from 1879 to 1971. The Shurtleff campus is now the site of the Southern Illinois University School of Dental Medicine.

== Transportation ==
Alton station provides Amtrak intercity rail service along the Lincoln Service route. Trains travel north to Chicago Union Station, and south to Gateway Transportation Center in St. Louis. Madison County Transit provides bus service in the city with hubs downtown and at the Amtrak station.

== Media ==
Alton has one daily newspaper, The Telegraph, formerly the Alton Evening Telegraph. The Telegraph provides coverage of local news, sports, and relevant national news.

Locally owned Big Z Media operates Radio Station WBGZ 1570AM and 107.1FM and Music Radio Station 94.3FM. In 2022, Big Z Media acquired AdVantage News, a free online (daily) and print newspaper, focusing on community features and hyperlocal news.

Alton also has internet-based resource, Riverbender.com. Named for the local bend in the Mississippi River, Riverbender is a portal serving local and national news, sports, obituaries, classified advertising, and events. In 2007, it was the first company to broadcast the Alton High School's sports games live online.

== Film and television ==
The 1979 feature film Dreamer, starring Tim Matheson, Susan Blakely, and Jack Warden, was primarily shot on location in Alton. The McPike Mansion and Mineral Springs Hotel were featured on the Travel Channel series Ghost Adventures. Alton was featured on the third season of the Hulu series Small Business Revolution.

== Notable people ==
- Jesse Anderson, who stabbed his wife to death in 1992, was murdered in prison alongside serial killer Jeffrey Dahmer by Christopher Scarver in 1994.
- David J. Apple, a pioneer in ophthalmological research and ophthalmic pathology and medical historian and biographer, was born in Alton.
- Frank Ballard, puppeteer and professor at the University of Connecticut, was the founder of the first puppetry bachelor of fine arts program in the United States
- Amos E. Benbow, Illinois state legislator
- Alexander Botkin, Wisconsin state senator
- George T. Brown, newspaper editor, mayor of Alton 1846–47, U.S. Senate sergeant-of-arms 1861–69
- Joseph Brown, miller, steamboat captain, mayor of Alton 1856–57, mayor of St. Louis 1871–75
- Samuel A. Buckmaster, prison warden and state legislator
- Jonathan Russell Bullock, Rhode Island state legislator and US federal judge; served on the Alton city council
- Dick Burwell, pitcher for the Chicago Cubs
- March F. Chase, head of explosives division, War Industries Board
- John W. Coppinger, lawyer, Illinois state legislator, mayor of Alton
- Anthony W. Daly, Illinois state representative, judge, and lawyer
- Levi Davis, Illinois State Auditor and lawyer
- Miles Davis, jazz musician
- Steve Davis, Illinois state legislator
- AnnMaria De Mars, technology executive, author and judoka
- Ezekiel Elliott, NFL running back
- Herbert G. Giberson, Illinois state senator and businessman
- David Goins, first African-American mayor of Alton
- Lloyd Nelson Hand, Chief of Protocol of the United States (1965–66) and assistant to U.S. Senate Majority Leader Lyndon B. Johnson (1957–61)
- Craig Hentrich, NFL football player
- Charles A. Herb, merchant, mayor of Alton, Illinois State Senator
- Michael Ann Holly, art historian and mother of actress Lauren Holly
- Mary Beth Hughes, actress
- Donald Juel, Lutheran educator and scholar
- Don Lenhardt, outfielder, first baseman, third baseman, scout and coach with several MLB teams
- Lawrence Leritz, Broadway, Film, TV, Dance and Recording
- Stephen Harriman Long, U.S. army explorer, topographical engineer, and railway engineer, retired and died in Alton
- Elijah Lovejoy, abolitionist
- Bill Lyons, infielder for the St. Louis Cardinals
- Trevor Mann, a.k.a. Ricochet, professional wrestler in AEW
- Barrelhouse Buck McFarland, blues and boogie-woogie pianist and singer
- Jumbo McGinnis, pitcher for the St. Louis Brown Stockings
- Dakota Mermis, professional ice hockey player
- Salim Nourallah, musician and producer
- Edward O'Hare, Medal of Honor recipient; O'Hare Airport in Chicago is named in his honor; graduate of Western Military Academy in Alton
- John M. Olin, inventor, industrialist, philanthropist
- William S. Paley, founder and chairman of the board of directors of CBS Corp.; graduate of Western Military Academy in Alton
- James Earl Ray, convicted for the assassination of Martin Luther King Jr.
- Arch Reilly, infielder for the Pittsburgh Pirates
- Red Rhodes, musician and steel guitarist
- Christina Romer, 25th chair of the Council of Economic Advisors
- Rosey Rowswell, baseball broadcaster for Pittsburgh Pirates
- Andrew Schlafly, son of Phyllis Schlafly, attorney, homeschool teacher, Christian conservative activist, and founder of Conservapedia
- Phyllis Schlafly, conservative author, constitutional lawyer, and activist, known for her role in defeating the Equal Rights Amendment in the late 1970s and early 1980s
- Thomas N. Scortia, authored novel adapted into film The Towering Inferno
- William Sears, doctor and author of several popular books on pregnancy and parenting
- Dale Swann, character actor
- Richard Thatcher, Union Civil War soldier and first president of Territorial Normal School, now the University of Central Oklahoma
- Paul Tibbets Jr., pilot of the Enola Gay; graduated from Western Military Academy in Alton
- Lyman Trumbull, United States Senator from Illinois and coauthor of the Thirteenth Amendment to the United States Constitution
- Louis Unser, auto racer; Unser family patriarch, and nine-time Pikes Peak Hill Climb winner
- Robert Wadlow, at 8 feet and 11.1 inches, the tallest known person in recorded history
- Minor Watson, stage and screen actor
- Jesse White, 37th Secretary of State of Illinois
- Beals Wright, Hall of Fame tennis player, died in Alton
- Rick Yager, cartoonist

== See also ==
- Alton (Amtrak station)
- Alton Township, Madison County, Illinois
