= FIU Panthers men's basketball statistical leaders =

The FIU Panthers men's basketball statistical leaders are individual statistical leaders of the FIU Panthers men's basketball program in various categories, including points, rebounds, assists, steals, and blocks. Within those areas, the lists identify single-game, single-season, and career leaders. The Panthers represent Florida International University in the NCAA's Conference USA.

FIU began competing in intercollegiate basketball in 1981, the same year in which it became a four-year institution (previously, it had been an upper division college that did not enroll freshmen or sophomores). The NCAA did not officially record assists as a stat until the 1983–84 season, and blocks and steals until the 1985–86 season, but Florida State's record books includes players in these stats before these seasons. These lists are updated through the end of the 2020–21 season.

== Scoring ==
Career
Rk	Player	Points	Seasons
1	Dwight Stewart	2,101	1988–89 1989–90 1990–91 1991–92 1992–93
2	Carlos Arroyo	1,600	1997–98 1998–99 1999–00 2000–01
3	Patrick McDonald	1,515	1982–83 1983–84 1984–85 1985–86
4	Mark Hollin	1,291	1981–82 1982–83 1983–84 1984–85
5	Gene Derkack	1,146	1995–96 1996–97 1997–98 1998–99
6	Trejon Jacob	1,135	2017–18 2018–19 2019–20
7	Brian Beard Jr.	1,096	2017–18 2018–19
8	Alex Galindo	1,050	2006–07 2007–08 2008–09
9	Donte McGill	994	2015–16 2016–17
10	Antonio Daye Jr.	989	2018–19 2019–20 2020–21

Season
Rk	Player	Points	Season
1	Carlos Arroyo	615	2000–01
2	Dennis Mavin	569	2014–15
3	Denver Jones	564	2022–23
4	Brian Beard Jr.	561	2018–19
5	Corey Stephenson	559	2025–26
6	Dwight Stewart	541	1990–91
7	Tymell Murphy	516	2013–14
8	Ivan Almonte	515	2004–05
9	Dwight Stewart	513	1991–92
10	Dedric Taylor	511	1996–97

Single game
Rk	Player	Points	Season	Opponent
1	Carlos Arroyo	39	2000–01	North Texas
2	Trejon Jacob	38	2017–18	Florida Gulf Coast
3	Eric Nottage	37	2016–17	UAB
4	Brian Beard Jr.	36	2018–19	Youngstown St
5	DeJuan Wright	35	2011–12	South Alabama
6	Corey Stephenson	34	2025–26	Middle Tennessee
	Elmo Stephen	34	2016–17	North Texas
	Alex Galindo	34	2007–08	Louisiana-Monroe
	Ismael N’Diaye	34	2004–05	Little Rock
	Dwight Stewart	34	1992–93	UCF
	Ruben Colon	34	1989–90	U.S. International

== Rebounds ==
Career
Rk	Player	Rebounds	Seasons
1	Patrick McDonald	875	1982–83 1983–84 1984–85 1985–86
2	Dwight Stewart	806	1988–89 1989–90 1990–91 1991–92 1992–93
3	Karel Rosario	628	1997–98 1998–99 1999–00 2000–01
4	Osasumwen Osaghae	616	2016–17 2017–18 2018–19 2019–20
5	Ivan Almonte	578	2004–05 2005–06
6	Mark Hollin	482	1981–82 1982–83 1983–84 1984–85
7	Darius Cook	480	1997–98 1998–99 1999–00
8	Adrian Diaz	479	2014–15 2015–16
	Gene Derkack	479	1995–96 1996–97 1997–98 1998–99
10	Alex Galindo	451	2006–07 2007–08 2008–09

Season
Rk	Player	Rebounds	Season
1	Ivan Almonte	297	2004–05
2	Carlton Phoenix	293	1986–87
3	Ivan Almonte	281	2005–06
4	Rakeem Buckles	266	2013–14
5	Osasumwen Osaghae	263	2018–19
6	Michael Kessens	260	2016–17
7	Osasumwen Osaghae	259	2019–20
8	Adrian Diaz	251	2015–16
	Hector Rodriguez	251	1985–86
10	Patrick McDonald	247	1984–85

Single game
Rk	Player	Rebounds	Season	Opponent
1	Michael Kessens	23	2016–17	Elon

== Assists ==
Career
Rk	Player	Assists	Seasons
1	Carlos Arroyo	459	1997–98 1998–99 1999–00 2000–01
2	Brian Beard Jr.	381	2017–18 2018–19
3	Antonio Daye Jr.	344	2018–19 2019–20 2020–21
4	Tevin Brewer	324	2019–20 2020–21 2021–22
5	Dwight Stewart	264	1988–89 1989–90 1990–91 1991–92 1992–93
6	Patrick McDonald	256	1982–83 1983–84 1984–85 1985–86
7	Arturo Dean	246	2022–23 2023–24
8	Carlos Morban	227	2001–02 2002–03 2003–04
9	Benny Valdes	223	1991–92 1992–93
10	Brett Lewis	210	1988–89 1989–90 1990–91

Season
Rk	Player	Assists	Season
1	Brian Beard Jr.	203	2018–19
2	Brian Beard Jr.	178	2017–18
3	Tevin Brewer	169	2021–22
4	Antonio Daye Jr.	152	2019–20
5	Carlos Arroyo	135	1997–98
6	Arturo Dean	124	2023–24
7	Benny Valdes	123	1991–92
8	Arturo Dean	122	2022–23
9	Ronnie Bryant	119	1987–88
10	Carlos Arroyo	117	2000–01

Single game
Rk	Player	Assists	Season	Opponent
1	Carlos Arroyo	13	1999–00	Northern Illinois

== Steals ==
Career
Rk	Player	Steals	Seasons
1	Carlos Morban	204	2001–02 2002–03 2003–04
2	Brian Beard Jr.	191	2017–18 2018–19
3	Arturo Dean	185	2022–23 2023–24
4	Carlos Arroyo	177	1997–98 1998–99 1999–00 2000–01
5	Dwight Stewart	172	1988–89 1989–90 1990–91 1991–92 1992–93
6	Antonio Daye Jr.	160	2018–19 2019–20 2020–21
7	Patrick McDonald	147	1982–83 1983–84 1984–85 1985–86
8	Gene Derkack	140	1995–96 1996–97 1997–98 1998–99
9	Mark Hollin	125	1981–82 1982–83 1983–84 1984–85
10	Marcus Carreño	122	1996–97 1997–98 1998–99

Season
Rk	Player	Steals	Season
1	Arturo Dean	104	2023–24
2	Brian Beard Jr.	100	2018–19
3	Brian Beard Jr.	90	2017–18
4	Carlos Morban	87	2001–02
5	Arturo Dean	81	2022–23
6	Jeremy Allen	77	2011–12
7	Deric Hill	75	2012–13
8	Bobby Lester	67	1983–84
9	Carlos Arroyo	66	1997–98
10	Carlos Morban	64	2002–03

Single game
Rk	Player	Steals	Season	Opponent
1	Arturo Dean	10	2023–24	Florida Gulf Coast
2	Carlos Morban	8	2001–02	South Alabama
	Carlos Morban	8	2001–02	Louisiana

== Blocks ==
Career
Rk	Player	Blocks	Seasons
1	Osasumwen Osaghae	252	2016–17 2017–18 2018–19 2019–20
2	Adrian Diaz	192	2014–15 2015–16
3	Seth Pinkey	136	2021–22 2022–23 2023–24
4	Dwight Stewart	126	1988–89 1989–90 1990–91 1991–92 1992–93
5	Dimon Carrigan	100	2019–20 2020–21
6	Russell Hicks	90	2007–08 2008–09
7	Tymell Murphy	83	2012–13 2013–14
8	Taurance Johnson	74	2001–02 2002–03 2003–04
9	Byron Burnett	73	2003–04 2004–05
10	Hector Rodriguez	72	1984–85 1985–86

Season
Rk	Player	Blocks	Season
1	Osasumwen Osaghae	122	2019–20
2	Adrian Diaz	99	2014–15
3	Osasumwen Osaghae	94	2018–19
4	Adrian Diaz	93	2015–16
5	Russell Hicks	60	2007–08
	Dimon Carrigan	60	2020–21
7	Jabahri Brown	58	1999–00
8	Seth Pinkey	57	2023–24
	Vianney Salatchoum	57	2024–25
10	Taurance Johnson	55	2001–02

Single game
Rk	Player	Blocks	Season	Opponent
1	Adrian Diaz	13	2014–15	UAB
