= NABC Coach of the Year =

American men's collegiate basketball head coach award

- Awarded for: the most outstanding men's basketball head coaches in all levels of competition
- Country: United States
- Presented by: NABC

History
- First award: 1959
- Most recent: NCAA DI: Jon Scheyer, Duke; NCAA DII: Bryan Rooney, Cal State East Bay; NCAA DIII: Anthony Medina, St. Thomas (TX); NAIA: Drew Stutts, Freed–Hardeman; Two-year schools: Kyle Cooper, Howard (TX)
- Website: Official website

The NABC Coach of the Year is an award given annually by the National Association of Basketball Coaches (NABC) to recognize the top head coaches in the National Collegiate Athletic Association (NCAA) Division I, II, and III, the National Association of Intercollegiate Athletics (NAIA), and two-year colleges.

The award has been given since the 1958–59 season to NCAA Division I coaches, since 1961–62 to Division II, and since 1975–76 to Division III coaches. At the NAIA level it has been awarded since 1992–93, while the two-year schools' coaches have been honored since 1983–84.. Within these, the NABC also names District Coaches of the Year before ultimately selecting one National Coach of the Year.

Through the 2024–25 college basketball season, there have been 35 multiple-time winners spanning the four associations. Larry Gipson and Ray Harper are the only repeat winners who were honored at multiple association levels. Gipson won in 1982–83 at the helm of two-year school Northeastern Oklahoma A&M, and again in 2002–03 while leading Division II's Northeastern State. Harper won in 1998–99 and 2000–01 at the NCAA Division II level while also earning the award in 2007–08 in the NAIA.

Two coaches are tied for the most all-time awards, with five apiece: John Wooden of UCLA (Division I) and Ben McCollum of Northwest Missouri State (Division II). Close behind them with four awards is Bo Ryan of Wisconsin–Platteville (Division III).

== Key ==
†	Co-Coaches of the Year
Coach (X)	Denotes the number of times the player has been awarded the NABC Coach of the Year award at that point

== Coaches of the Year ==
=== NCAA ===
Division I
Season	Winner	Team	Reference
1958–59	Eddie Hickey	Marquette	
1959–60	Pete Newell	California	
1960–61	Fred Taylor	Ohio State	
1961–62	Fred Taylor (2)	Ohio State	
1962–63	Ed Jucker	Cincinnati	
1963–64	John Wooden	UCLA	
1964–65	Butch van Breda Kolff	Princeton	
1965–66	Adolph Rupp	Kentucky	
1966–67	John Wooden (2)	UCLA	
1967–68	Guy Lewis	Houston	
1968–69	John Wooden (3)	UCLA	
1969–70	John Wooden (4)	UCLA	
1970–71	Jack Kraft	Villanova	
1971–72	John Wooden (5)	UCLA	
1972–73	Gene Bartow	Memphis	
1973–74	Al McGuire	Marquette	
1974–75	Bob Knight	Indiana	
1975–76	Johnny Orr	Michigan	
1976–77	Dean Smith	North Carolina	
1977–78^{†}	Bill Foster	Duke	
1977–78^{†}	Abe Lemons	Texas	
1978–79	Ray Meyer	DePaul	
1979–80	Lute Olson	Iowa	
1980–81^{†}	Jack Hartman	Kansas State	
1980–81^{†}	Ralph Miller	Oregon State	
1981–82	Don Monson	Idaho	
1982–83	Lou Carnesecca	St. John's	
1983–84	Marv Harshman	Washington	
1984–85	John Thompson	Georgetown	
1985–86	Eddie Sutton	Kentucky	
1986–87	Rick Pitino	Providence	
1987–88	John Chaney	Temple	
1988–89	P. J. Carlesimo	Seton Hall	
1989–90	Jud Heathcote	Michigan State	
1990–91	Mike Krzyzewski	Duke	
1991–92	George Raveling	USC	
1992–93	Eddie Fogler	Vanderbilt	
1993–94^{†}	Gene Keady	Purdue	
1993–94^{†}	Nolan Richardson	Arkansas	
1994–95	Jim Harrick	UCLA	
1995–96	John Calipari	UMass	
1996–97	Clem Haskins	Minnesota	
1997–98	Bill Guthridge	North Carolina	
1998–99^{†}	Mike Krzyzewski (2)	Duke	
1998–99^{†}	Jim O'Brien	Ohio State	
1999–00	Gene Keady (2)	Purdue	
2000–01	Tom Izzo	Michigan State	
2001–02	Kelvin Sampson	Oklahoma	
2002–03	Tubby Smith	Kentucky	
2003–04^{†}	Phil Martelli	Saint Joseph's	
2003–04^{†}	Mike Montgomery	Stanford	
2004–05	Bruce Weber	Illinois	
2005–06	Jay Wright	Villanova	
2006–07	Todd Lickliter	Butler	
2007–08	Bob McKillop	Davidson	
2008–09^{†}	Mike Anderson	Missouri	
2008–09^{†}	John Calipari (2)	Memphis	
2009–10	Jim Boeheim	Syracuse	
2010–11	Steve Fisher	San Diego State	
2011–12	Tom Izzo (2)	Michigan State	
2012–13	Jim Crews	Saint Louis	
2013–14	Gregg Marshall	Wichita State	
2014–15	John Calipari (3)	Kentucky	
2015–16	Bill Self	Kansas	
2016–17	Mark Few	Gonzaga	
2017–18	Tony Bennett	Virginia	
2018–19	Matt Painter	Purdue	
2019–20	Anthony Grant	Dayton	
2020–21	Mark Few (2)	Gonzaga	
2021–22	Tommy Lloyd	Arizona	
2022–23	Shaka Smart	Marquette	
2023–24	Kelvin Sampson (2)	Houston	
2024–25	Bruce Pearl	Auburn	
2025–26	Jon Scheyer	Duke	

Division II
Season	Winner	Team	Reference
1958–59	No award		
1959–60	No award		
1960–61	No award		
1961–62	Jim Phelan	Mount St. Mary's	
1962–63	Jim Iverson	South Dakota	
1963–64	Arad McCutchan	Evansville	
1964–65	Arad McCutchan (2)	Evansville	
1965–66	Guy R. Strong	Kentucky Wesleyan	
1966–67	Clarence Gaines	Winston-Salem State	
1967–68	Bob Polk	Trinity (TX)	
1968–69	William Callahan	American International	
1969–70	Lucian Mitchell	Kentucky State	
1970–71	Bob Daniels	Kentucky Wesleyan	
1971–72	Charles Moir	Roanoke	
1972–73	Bob Jones	Kentucky Wesleyan	
1973–74	Bill Thomas	Southwest Missouri State	
1974–75	Sonny Allen	Old Dominion	
1975–76^{†}	Herb Magee	Philadelphia Textile	
1975–76^{†}	Don Zech	Puget Sound	
1976–77	Ron Shumate	Chattanooga	
1977–78	John Chaney	Cheyney State	
1978–79	Dave Buss	Green Bay	
1979–80	Hal Wissel	Florida Southern	
1980–81	Jim Phelan (2)	Mount St. Mary's	
1981–82	Mac Petty	Wabash	
1982–83	Ralph Underhill	Wright State	
1983–84	Lynn Nance	Central Missouri State	
1984–85	Bill Jones	Jacksonville State	
1985–86	Dave Bike	Sacred Heart	
1986–87	Wayne Chapman	Kentucky Wesleyan	
1987–88	Don Doucette	UMass Lowell	
1988–89	Michael Bernard	North Carolina Central	
1989–90	Wayne Chapman (2)	Kentucky Wesleyan	
1990–91	Gary Elliott	North Alabama	
1991–92	Bruce Webster	Bridgeport	
1992–93	Pat Douglass	Cal State Bakersfield	
1993–94	Pat Douglass (2)	Cal State Bakersfield	
1994–95	Bruce Pearl	Southern Indiana	
1995–96	Gary Garner	Fort Hays State	
1996–97	Pat Douglass (3)	Cal State Bakersfield	
1997–98	Bob Williams	UC Davis	
1998–99	Ray Harper	Kentucky Wesleyan	
1999–00	Mike Dunlap	Metro State	
2000–01	Ray Harper (2)	Kentucky Wesleyan	
2001–02	Mike Dunlap (2)	Metro State	
2002–03	Larry Gipson (2)	Northeastern State	
2003–04	Tony Ingle	Kennesaw State	
2004–05	Dave Robbins	Virginia Union	
2005–06	Mike Leaf	Winona State	
2006–07	Ron Lievense	Barton	
2007–08	Mike Leaf (2)	Winona State	
2008–09	Ron Niekamp	Findlay	
2009–10	Greg Kamansky	Cal Poly Pomona	
2010–11	Scott Davenport	Bellarmine	
2011–12	Brad Jackson	Western Washington	
2012–13	Steve Hesser	Drury	
2013–14	Kim Anderson	Central Missouri	
2014–15	Linc Darner	Florida Southern	
2015–16	Tom Billeter	Augustana (SD)	
2016–17	Ben McCollum	Northwest Missouri State	
2017–18	Andy Bronkema	Ferris State	
2018–19	Ben McCollum (2)	Northwest Missouri State	
2019–20	Ben McCollum (3)	Northwest Missouri State	
2020–21	Ben McCollum (4)	Northwest Missouri State	
2021–22	Ben McCollum (5)	Northwest Missouri State	
2022–23	Jim Crutchfield	Nova Southeastern	
2023–24	Matt Margenthaler	Minnesota State	
2024–25	Jim Crutchfield (2)	Nova Southeastern	
2025–26	Bryan Rooney	Cal State East Bay	

Division III
Season	Winner	Team	Reference
1958–59	No award		
1959–60	No award		
1960–61	No award		
1961–62	No award		
1962–63	No award		
1963–64	No award		
1964–65	No award		
1965–66	No award		
1966–67	No award		
1967–68	No award		
1968–69	No award		
1969–70	No award		
1970–71	No award		
1971–72	No award		
1972–73	No award		
1973–74	No award		
1974–75	No award		
1975–76	Bob Hamilton	Wittenberg	
1976–77	Larry Hunter	Wittenberg	
1977–78	Dan McCarrell	North Park	
1978–79	Dan McCarrell (2)	North Park	
1979–80	Dan McCarrell (3)	North Park	
1980–81	Jerry Welsh	Potsdam State	
1981–82	Bobby Dye	Cal State Bakersfield	
1982–83	Bob Bessoir	Scranton	
1983–84	Dave Vander Meulen	Wisconsin–Whitewater	
1984–85	Doc Sauers	Albany	
1985–86	Jerry Welsh (2)	Potsdam State	
1986–87	Bosco Djurickovic	North Park	
1987–88	Gene Mehaffey	Ohio Wesleyan	
1988–89	Dave Vander Meulen (2)	Wisconsin–Whitewater	
1989–90	Michael Neer	Rochester	
1990–91	Bo Ryan	Wisconsin–Platteville	
1991–92	Ed Douma	Calvin	
1992–93	Joe Campoli	Ohio Northern	
1993–94	Pat Flannery	Lehigh Valley	
1994–95	Bo Ryan (2)	Wisconsin–Platteville	
1995–96	John Giannini	Rowan	
1996–97	Dennie Bridges	Illinois Wesleyan	
1997–98	Bo Ryan (3)	Wisconsin–Platteville	
1998–99	Bo Ryan (4)	Wisconsin–Platteville	
1999–00	Kevin Vande Streek	Calvin	
2000–01	Mike Lonergan	Catholic	
2001–02	Dick Reynolds	Otterbein	
2002–03	Dave Paulsen	Williams	
2003–04	Dave Paulsen (2)	Williams	
2004–05	Jeff Gamber	York (PA)	
2005–06	Dave Macedo	Pensacola	
2006–07	David Hixon	Amherst	
2007–08	Mark Edwards	Washington U.	
2008–09	Mark Edwards (2)	Washington U.	
2009–10	Bob Semling	Wisconsin–Stevens Point	
2010–11	Steve Fritz	St. Thomas (MN)	
2011–12	Pat Miller	Wisconsin–Whitewater	
2012–13	David Hixon (2)	Amherst	
2013–14	Pat Miller (2)	Wisconsin–Whitewater	
2014–15	Bob Semling (2)	Wisconsin–Stevens Point	
2015–16	John Tauer	St. Thomas (MN)	
2016–17	Stephen Brennan	Babson	
2017–18	Dale Wellman	Nebraska Wesleyan	
2018–19	Matt Lewis	Wisconsin–Oshkosh	
2019–20	Landry Kosmalski	Swarthmore	
2020–21	No award		
2021–22	Josh Merkel	Randolph–Macon	
2022–23	John Krikorian	Christopher Newport	
2023–24	Brooks Miller	Trine	
2024–25	James Cosgrove	Trinity (CT)	
2025–26	Anthony Medina	St. Thomas (TX)	

=== NAIA ===
In 2008–09, the NABC began presenting separate awards for coaches of the year in NAIA Divisions I and II. In 2020–21, the NAIA removed its divisional classifications.

Non-divisional era (1993–2008; 2021–present)
Season	Coach	Team	Reference
1992–93	Gerald Stockton	Midwestern State	
1993–94	Jim Reid	Georgetown (KY)	
1994–95	Duane Reboul	Birmingham–Southern	
1995–96	Larry Holley	William Jewell	
1996–97	Roger Kaiser	Life	
1997–98	Bobby Martin	Southern Nazarene	
1998–99	Kim Elders	Cornerstone	
1999–00	Roger Kaiser (2)	Life	
2000–01	Don Lane	Transylvania	
2001–02	Harry Statham	McKendree	
2002–03	Ken Ammann	Concordia (CA)	
2003–04	Bob Bolen	Mountain State	
2004–05	No award		
2005–06	Terry Waldrop	Texas Wesleyan	
2006–07	Rocky Lamar	MidAmerica Nazarene	
2007–08	Ray Harper (3)	Oklahoma City	
2008–09	Split into NAIA Divisions I and II		
2009–10	Split into NAIA Divisions I and II		
2010–11	Split into NAIA Divisions I and II		
2011–12	Split into NAIA Divisions I and II		
2012–13	Split into NAIA Divisions I and II		
2013–14	Split into NAIA Divisions I and II		
2014–15	Split into NAIA Divisions I and II		
2015–16	Split into NAIA Divisions I and II		
2016–17	Split into NAIA Divisions I and II		
2017–18	Split into NAIA Divisions I and II		
2018–19	Split into NAIA Divisions I and II		
2019–20	Split into NAIA Divisions I and II		
2020–21	Austin Johnson (2)	Lewis–Clark State	
2021–22	Stacy Hollowell	Loyola (LA)	
2022–23	Colby Blaine	College of Idaho	
2023–24	Scott Moore	Grace	
2024–25	Colby Blaine (2)	College of Idaho	
2025–26	Drew Stutts	Freed–Hardeman	

Division I (2009–2020)
Season	Coach	Team	Reference
1992–93	No award		
1993–94	No award		
1994–95	No award		
1995–96	No award		
1996–97	No award		
1997–98	No award		
1998–99	No award		
1999–00	No award		
2000–01	No award		
2001–02	No award		
2002–03	No award		
2003–04	No award		
2004–05	No award		
2005–06	No award		
2006–07	No award		
2007–08	No award		
2008–09	Ralph Turner	Union (TN)	
2009–10	Bob Bolen (2)	Mountain State	
2010–11	Al Bruehl	Robert Morris (IL)	
2011–12	Chad Warner	Shorter	
2012–13	Bob Burchard	Columbia (MO)	
2013–14	Steve Knight	William Carey (MS)	
2014–15	Keith Adkins	Campbellsville	
2015–16	Dave Holmquist	Biola	
2016–17	Larry Cordaro	LSU–Alexandria	
2017–18	Kelvin Starr	The Master's	
2018–19	Ryan Moody	Benedictine (KS)	
2019–20	Austin Johnson	Lewis–Clark State	
2020–21	No award		
2021–22	No award		
2022–23	No award		
2023–24	No award		
2024–25	No award		
2025–26	No award		

Division II (2009–2020)
Season	Coach	Team	Reference
1992–93	No award		
1993–94	No award		
1994–95	No award		
1995–96	No award		
1996–97	No award		
1997–98	No award		
1998–99	No award		
1999–00	No award		
2000–01	No award		
2001–02	No award		
2002–03	No award		
2003–04	No award		
2004–05	No award		
2005–06	No award		
2006–07	No award		
2007–08	No award		
2008–09	Donnie Bostwick	Oklahoma Wesleyan	
2009–10	Donnie Bostwick (2)	Oklahoma Wesleyan	
2010–11	Rollie Massimino	Northwood (FL)	
2011–12	Danny Miles	Oregon Tech	
2012–13	Drew Diener	Cardinal Stritch	
2013–14	Greg Tonagel	Indiana Wesleyan	
2014–15	Kim Elders (2)	Cornerstone	
2015–16	Greg Tonagel (2)	Indiana Wesleyan	
2016–17	Kim Elders (3)	Cornerstone	
2017–18	Greg Tonagel (3)	Indiana Wesleyan	
2018–19	Ryan Cottingham	Spring Arbor	
2019–20	Mike McBride	Holy Cross (IN)	
2020–21	No award		
2021–22	No award		
2022–23	No award		
2023–24	No award		
2024–25	No award		
2025–26	No award		

=== Two-year schools ===
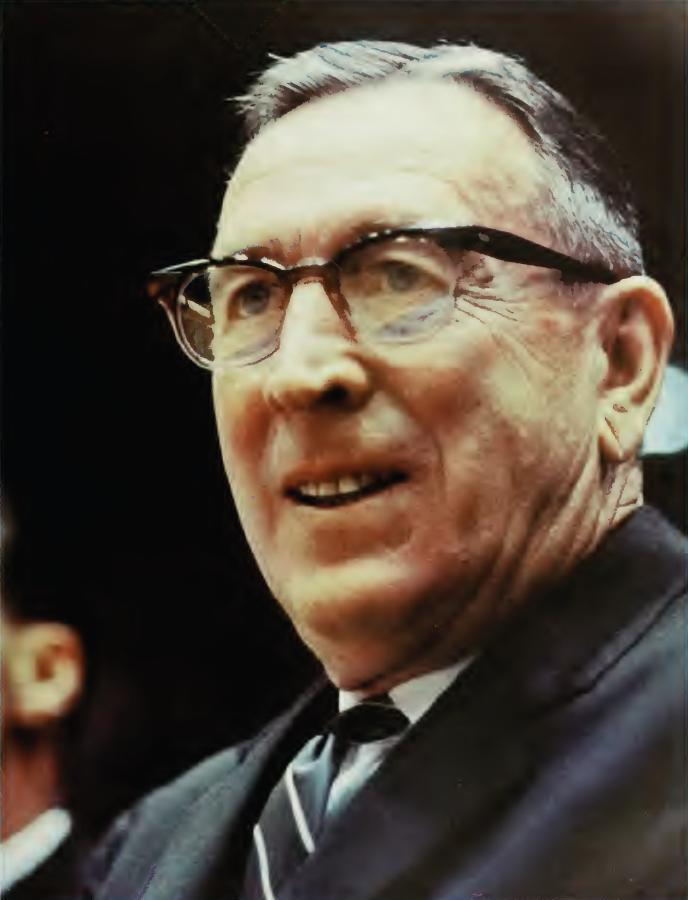
John Wooden, NCAA Division I, UCLA, 5× awardee

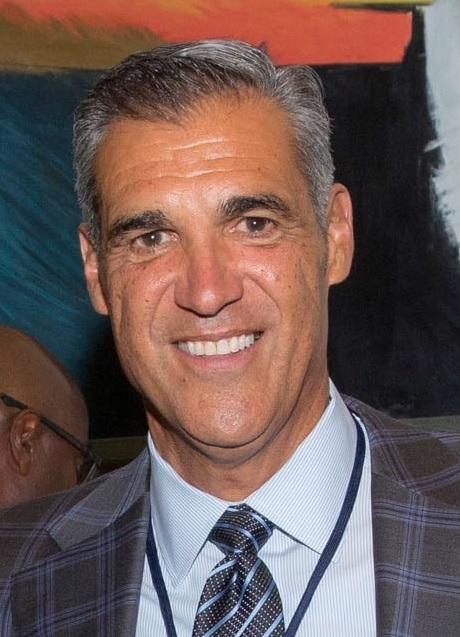
Jay Wright, NCAA Division I, Villanova, 2006

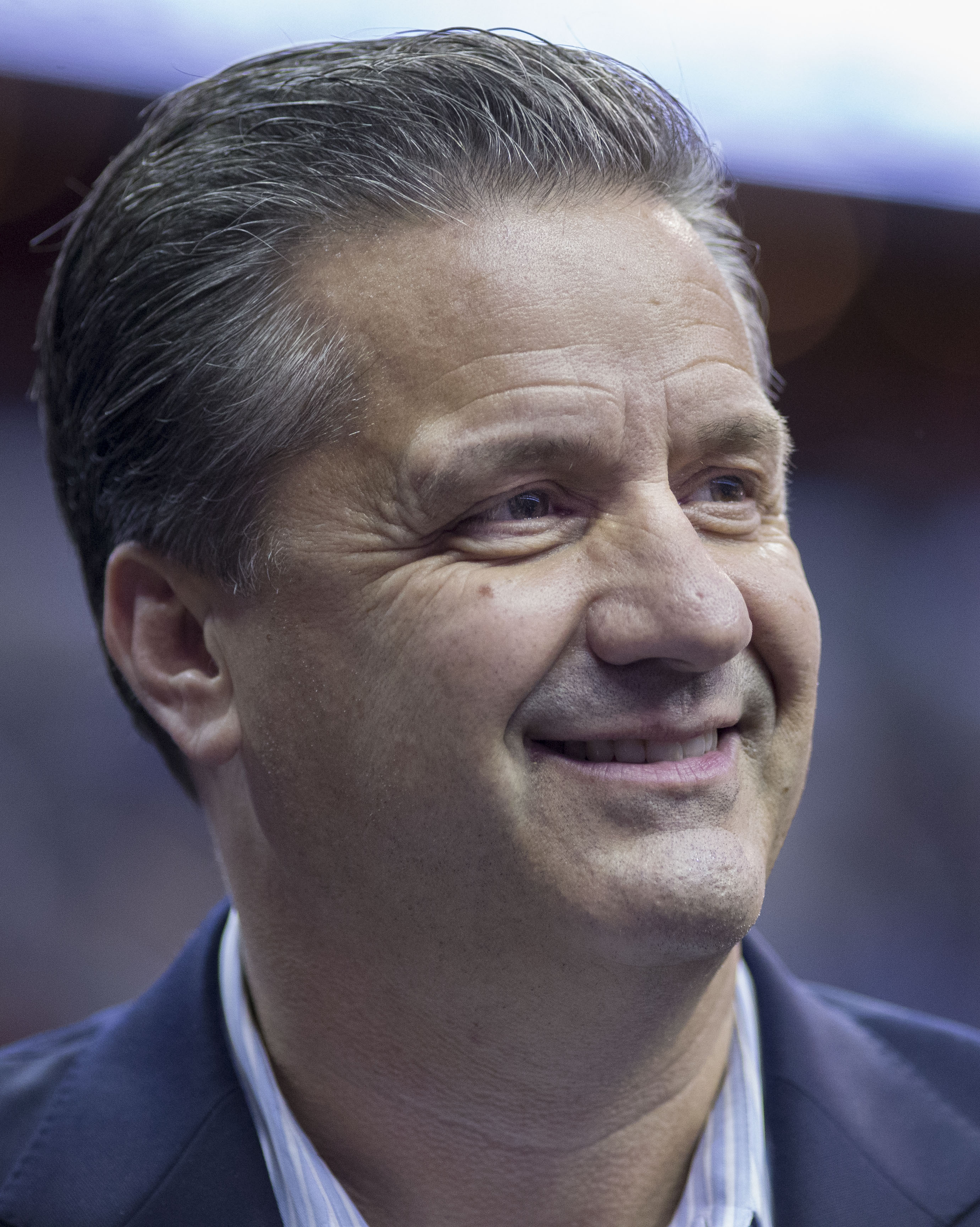
John Calipari, NCAA Division I, Kentucky, 3× awardee

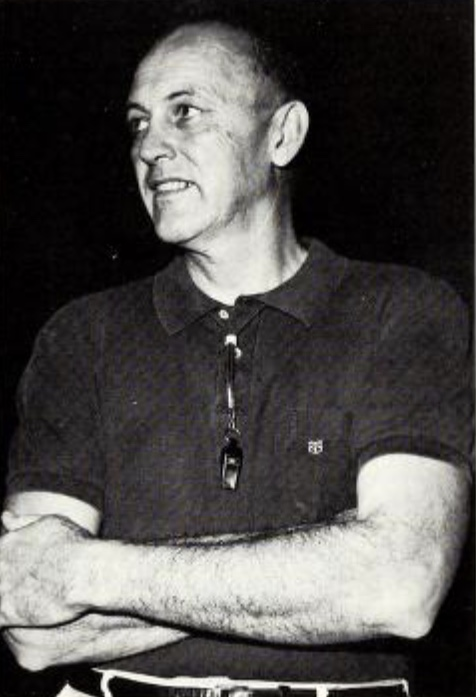
Arad McCutchan, NCAA Division II, Evansville, 2× awardee

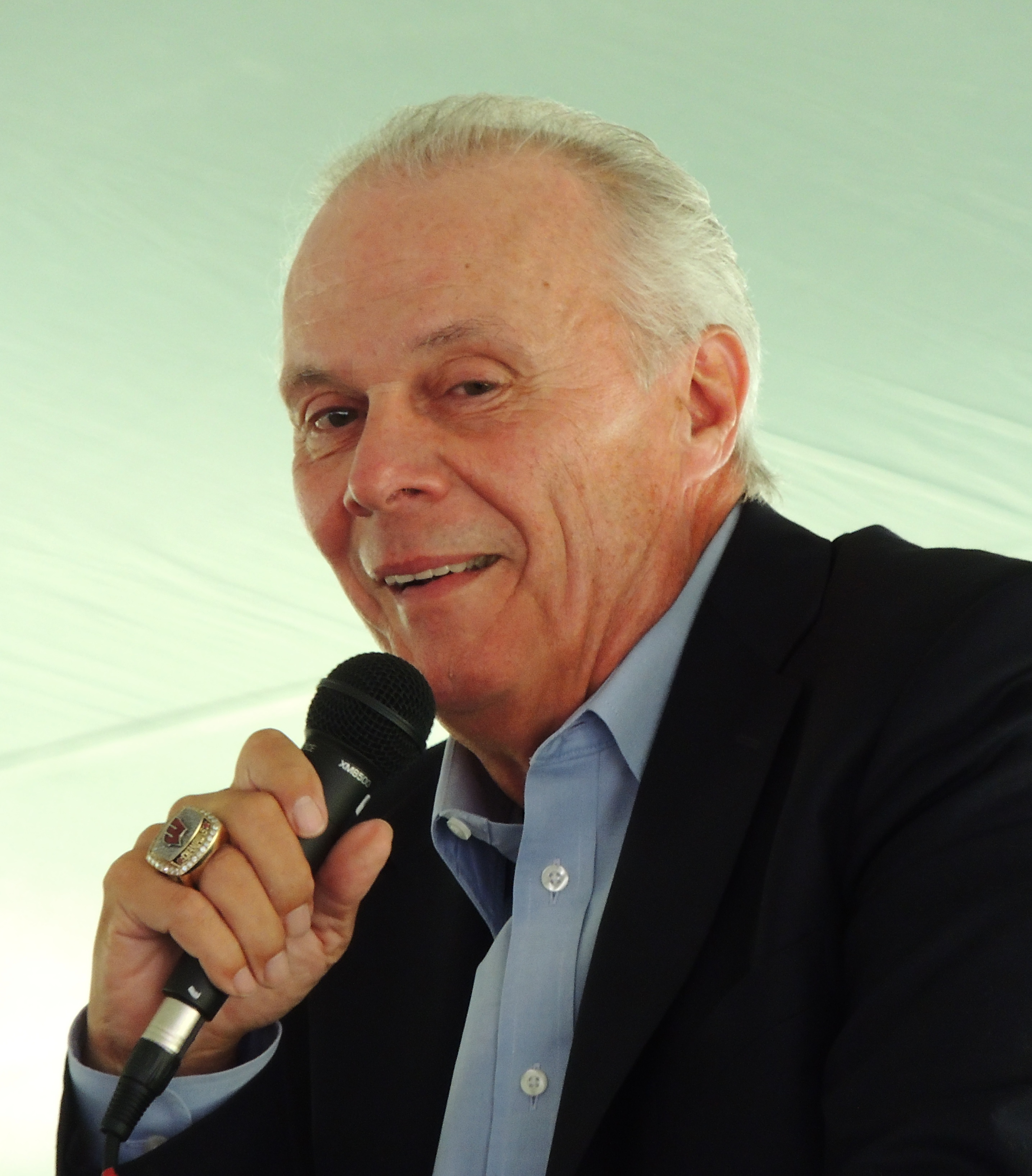
Bo Ryan, NCAA Division III, Wisconsin–Platteville, 4× awardee

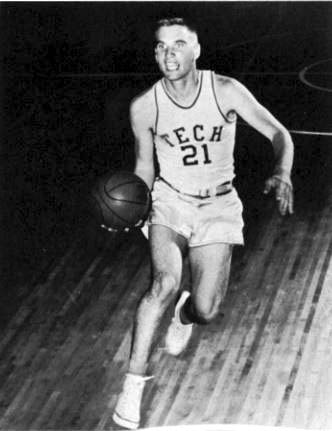
Roger Kaiser, NAIA, Life, 2× awardee

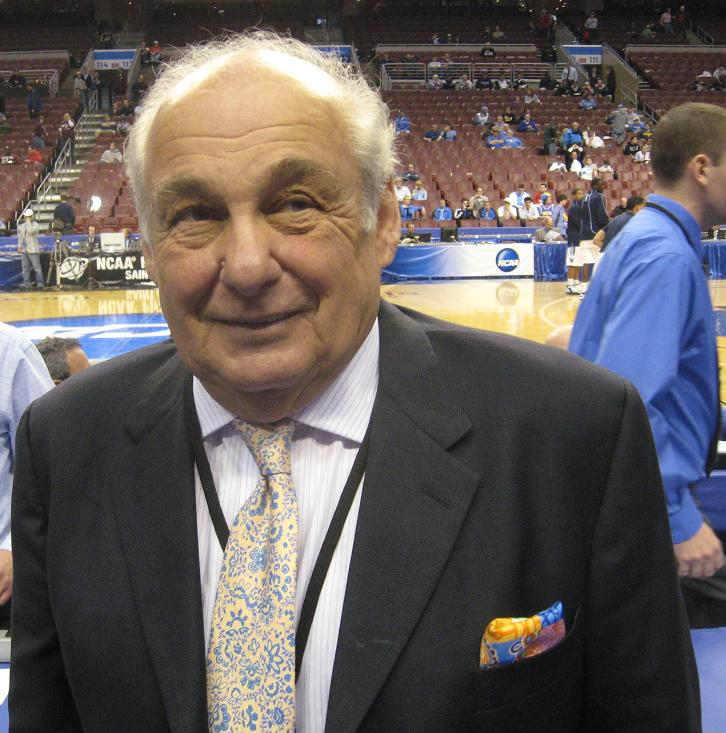
Rollie Massimino, NAIA Division II, Northwood, 2011

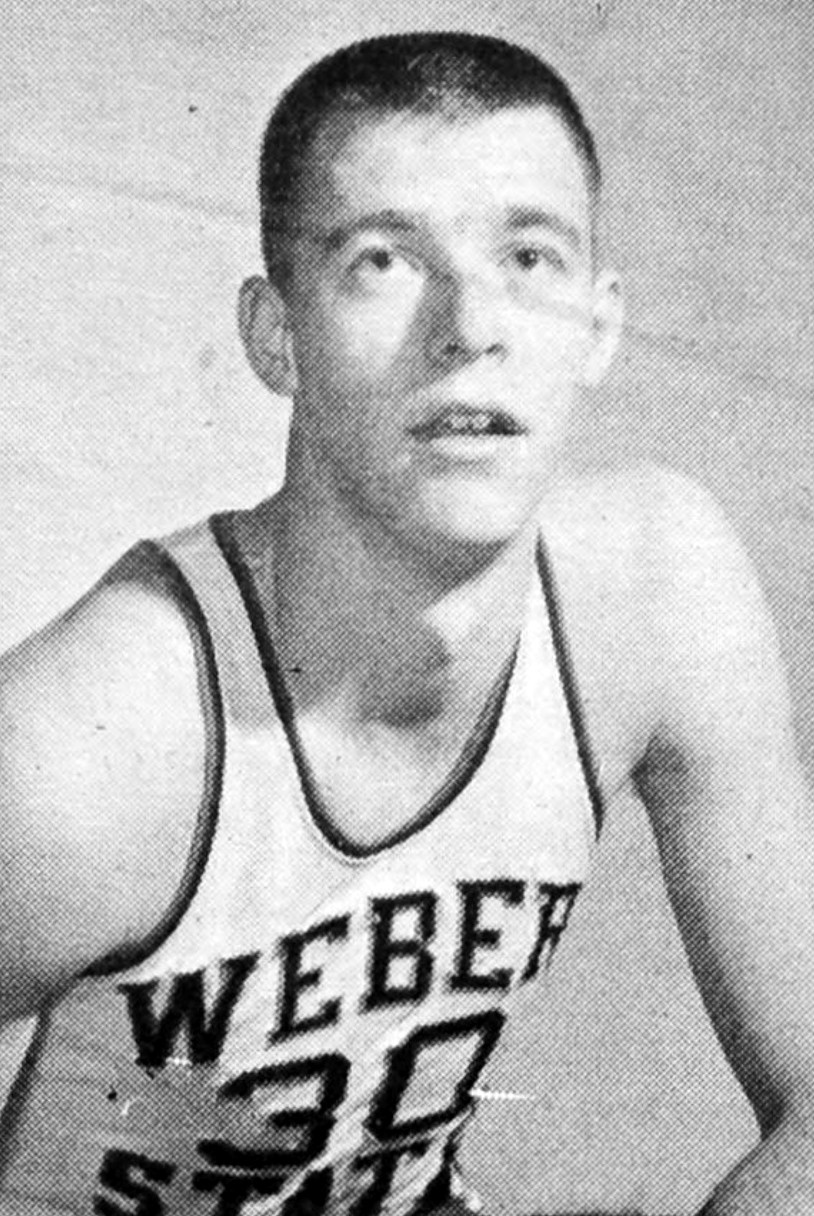
Dan Sparks, two-year schools, Vincennes, 1986

Season	Winner	Team	Reference
1983–84	Bill Alheim	Miami Dade–North	
1984–85	Denny Lehnus	Kankakee	
1985–86	Dan Sparks	Vincennes	
1986–87	Jerry Stone	Midland (TX)	
1987–88	David Farrar	Hutchinson	
1988–89	Larry Gipson	Northeastern Oklahoma A&M	
1989–90	Kirk Speraw	Pensacola	
1990–91	Chick Hess	Arizona Western	
1991–92	Fred Trenkle	College of Southern Idaho	
1992–93	Bob Marlin	Pensacola	
1993–94	Steve McClain	Hutchinson	
1994–95	Dave Campbell	Western Nebraska	
1995–96	Gary Shourds	Sullivan	
1996–97	Terry Carroll	Indian Hills	
1997–98	Terry Carroll (2)	Indian Hills	
1998–99	Ryan Cross	Barton (KS)	
1999–00	Joe O'Brien	Southeastern (IA)	
2000–01	Jay Spoonhour	Wabash Valley	
2001–02	Jeff Kidder	Utah Tech	
2002–03	Joe O'Brien (2)	Southeastern (IA)	
2003–04	Joe O'Brien (3)	Southeastern (IA)	
2004–05	Bill Foy	Paris	
2005–06	No award		
2006–07	No award		
2007–08	Todd Franklin	Southeastern Illinois	
2008–09	Mike Jeffers	Johnson County (KS)	
2009–10	Doug Wagemester	Kirkwood	
2010–11	Kirk Whiteman	Lincoln (IL)	
2011–12	Mike Apple	Sandhills	
2012–13	Tim Ryan	College of Central Florida	
2013–14	Matt Gordon	Phoenix	
2014–15	Chuck Moore	Richard Bland	
2015–16	Craig Doty	Rock Valley	
2016–17	Todd Lorensen	Southwestern (IA)	
2017–18	Steve Christiansen	Triton	
2018–19	Todd Franklin (2)	Vincennes	
2019–20	Mike Apple (2)	Sandhills	
2020–21	Brett Putz	Des Moines Area	
2021–22	John Pigatti	South Suburban	
2022–23	Randy Casey	Milwaukee Area Tech	
2023–24	Dillon Hargrove	National Park	
2024–25	Tim Sandquist	Kirkwood	
2025–26	Kyle Cooper	Howard (TX)	

== See also ==
- NABC Player of the Year – the equivalent honor for men's players at all levels of college basketball competition
- WBCA National Coach of the Year Award – the equivalent honor for women's basketball
