= Jerry Welsh =

Jerry Welsh may refer to:

- Jerry Welsh (basketball) (1936–2025), American basketball coach
- Jerry Welsh (ice hockey) (born 1950), Canadian ice hockey coach
