= David Moe =

David Moe may refer to:

- David Moe (men's basketball), American men's basketball coach
- David Moe (women's basketball), American women's basketball coach
