= List of Idaho State Bengals men's basketball head coaches =

The following is a list of Idaho State Bengals men's basketball head coaches at Idaho State University in Pocatello, Idaho. The Idaho State Bengals men's basketball program has been led by 16 head coaches in their Division I history. The sortable list is by total number of program wins.

Idaho State University has NCAA Tournament appearances in 1953, 1954, 1955, 1956, 1957, 1958, 1959, 1960, 1974, 1977 and 1987. The teams reached the sweet 16 in 1954, 1957, 1958, 1959, and 1977. The Bengals reached the Elite Eight in 1977.

Tenure	Coach	Years	Record	Pct.
1971–1977	Jim Killingsworth	6	109–54	.669
1991–1998	Herb Williams	7	97–124	.439
1998–2006	Doug Oliver	8	88–134	.396
1952–1956	Steve Belko	4	76–28	.731
2012–2019	Bill Evans	7	70–141	.332
1956–1959	John Grayson	3	68–17	.800
1977-1982	Lynn Archibald	5	65–66	.496
1959–1963	John Evans	4	60–41	.591
1985–1990	Jim Boutin	5	60–80	.429
2006–2010	Joe O'Brien	5	56–105	.348
1967–1971	Danny Miller	4	40–56	.417
1982–1985	Wayne Ballard	3	37–55	.402
2019–present	Ryan Looney	7	81–132	.380
1963–1965	James Nau	2	18–32	.360
1965–1967	Claude Retherford	2	17–34	.333
2011–2012	Deane Martin	1	7–13	.350
1952–Present	16 coaches	75 seasons	Record	Pct.
