= George Crispin =

American football and basketball coach

Biographical details
- Born: February 16, 1885; Illinois, U.S.
- Died: April 16, 1962 (aged 77); Denver, Colorado, U.S.

Coaching career (HC unless noted)

Football
- 1912–1913: Kansas State Normal

Basketball
- 1912–1914: Kansas State Normal

Head coaching record
- Overall: 9–9 (football)

George Adlai Crispin (February 16, 1885 – April 16, 1962) was an American college football and college basketball coach. He served as the head football coach at Kansas State Normal School—now known as Emporia State University—for two seasons, from 1912 until 1913, compiling a record of 9–9. Crispin came to Kansas State Normal in 1912, originally as an athletic instructor, but was later given football coaching duties when previous coach Fred Honhart resigned to go pursue studies in medicine. Crispin had prior experience in football coaching as an assistant coach at Carlisle Indian Industrial School. He resigned the coaching job in 1914 after a proposed pay cut was put forward by the university's board.

On November 27, 1914, Crispin married Daisy Burlingame, who had also worked at Kansas State Normal, in the bursar's office in Erie, Kansas. He had been working as an athletics supervisor with public schools in Madison, Wisconsin at the time where he also resided. He later moved to Colorado where he lived until his death in Denver in 1962.

== Head coaching record ==
=== Football ===
Year	Team	Overall	Conference	Standing	Bowl/playoffs
Kansas State Normals (Kansas Collegiate Athletic Conference) (1912–1913)
1912	Kansas State Normal	5–3	4–3		
1913	Kansas State Normal	4–6	4–4	T–7th	
Kansas State Normal:		9–9	8–7		
Total:		9–9			
