= Bessoir =

Bessoir is a surname. Notable people with the surname include:

- Bob Bessoir (1932–2020), American college basketball coach
- Emily Bessoir (born 2001), German basketball player
