= Ty Margenthaler =

American basketball coach (born 1971)

Current position
- Title: Assistant Coach
- Team: UAB
- Conference: American

Biographical details
- Born: August 27, 1971 (age 55); Macomb, Illinois, U.S.

Playing career
- 1992–94: Indian Hills (IA) Comm. Coll.
- 1994–96: SIU Edwardsville

Coaching career (HC unless noted)
- 1997–99: Roxana, IL HS
- 1997–99: SIU Edwardsville (asst.)
- 2000–06: Bradley (asst.)
- 2006–11: Wisconsin (asst.)
- 2011–2015: SEMO
- 2015–2016: Samford (asst.)
- 2016–2022: Saint Louis (associate HC)
- 2022–2023: South Dakota (asst.)
- 2023–2024: Pittsburgh (asst.)
- 2024–2025: North Alabama (asst.)
- 2025–present: UAB (asst.)

Head coaching record
- Overall: 38–78

Ty Margenthaler (born August 27, 1971) is an American college basketball coach and a women's assistant coach at UAB.

== Biography ==
A native of Macomb, Illinois, where his father, Jack, was coach at Western Illinois University, Margenthaler earned All-State basketball honors as a senior at Macomb High School. After graduating from Indian Hills Community College in Iowa, he transferred to Southern Illinois University Edwardsville where his father was the new head coach. Margenthaler was a two-year starter for the SIUE Cougars, scoring 831 points in 52 games, an average of 15.98 points per game. In addition to having a father as a basketball coach, his brother Matt is the men's head coach at Minnesota State University, Mankato. Margenthaler and his wife, Julie, have two children, Brice and Nate. Brice Margenthaler his first son is currently playing a Carl Sandburg Junior College.

== Coaching career ==
After graduating from SIUE in 1997 with a Bachelor of Arts degree in physical education and kinesiology, Margenthaler served as head coach at Roxana High School in Roxana, Illinois and as an assistant to SIUE Cougars women's coach Wendy Hedberg from 1997 to 1999. He worked as an assistant to head coach Paula Buscher at Bradley University, 2000–06, then from 2006 to 2011, he was an assistant to Lisa Stone at Wisconsin. On April 14, 2011, Margenthaler was named the head women's basketball coach at SEMO. He resigned on March 23, 2015. His appointment as an assistant coach at Samford University was announced on April 30, 2015. He was an assistant coach at Samford for 1 year than in the 2015-2016 season he was hired by his former boss Lisa Stone at Saint Louis University. He is now associate head coach at Saint Louis University.

== Head coaching record ==
Record table
Season	Team	Overall	Conference	Standing	Postseason
Southeast Missouri State Redhawks (Ohio Valley Conference) (2011–present)
2011–12	SEMO	7–22	4–12	10th	
2012–13	SEMO	11–18	5–11	5th West	
2013–14	SEMO	10–19	6–10	t-4th West	
2014–15	SEMO	10–19	3–13	t-10th	
Total:		38–78			
National champion Postseason invitational champion Conference regular season champion Conference regular season and conference tournament champion Division regular season champion Division regular season and conference tournament champion Conference tournament champion
