= Matt Margenthaler =

American basketball coach

Current position
- Title: Head coach
- Team: Minnesota State
- Conference: NSIC

Playing career
- 1986–1988: Iowa State
- 1988–1989: Parkland College
- 1989–1991: Western Illinois

Coaching career (HC unless noted)
- 1993–1994: STLCC-Florissant Valley
- 1994–1996: SIU Edwardsville (women's assistant)
- 1996–2001: South Dakota State (assistant)
- 2001–present: Minnesota State

Head coaching record
- Overall: 533–236 (.693)

Accomplishments and honors

Championships
- NCAA Division II tournament (2024); 5 NSIC regular season (2010, 2011, 2013, 2014, 2024); 3 NSIC tournament (2013, 2014, 2024); 3 NSIC South Division (2013, 2014, 2019); 3 NCC regular season (2006, 2007, 2008)

Awards
- NABC Division II Coach of the Year (2024); 3x NCC Coach of the Year (2006, 2007, 2008); 4x NSIC Coach of the Year (2010, 2011, 2014, 2015)

Matt Margenthaler is an American college basketball coach who is the head coach of the Minnesota State Mavericks men's basketball team.

== Early life and playing career ==
Margenthaler began his college basketball career playing at Iowa State. After two seasons, he transferred to Parkland College. After one season at Parkland, he transferred to Western Illinois where his father, Jack Margenthaler, was the head coach.

== Coaching career ==
Margenthaler worked for Louisville's athletic department in administration after graduating from Western Illinois in 1991. He was hired as the head coach at St. Louis Community College–Florissant Valley in 1993. Margenthaler was named the NJCAA Region 16 Coach of the Year in his only season at Florissant Valley. In 1994, Margenthler was hired to be an assistant for SIU Edwardsville's women's basketball team. He was hired as an assistant at South Dakota State in 1996.

Margenthaler was hired as the head coach of the Minnesota State University, Mankato Mavericks in 2001. He coached Minnesota State to a Division II national championship as the Mavericks defeated defending national champion Nova Southeastern 88–85 in the 2024 NCAA Division II title game. Margenthaler won his 500th game with a 90–88 victory over Minnesota State–Moorhead on January 17, 2024.

== Personal life ==
Margenthaler's father, Jack Margenthaler, was the head basketball coach at Western Illinois and SIU Edwardsville. His younger brother, Ty Margenthaler, is a women's college basketball coach and served as the head coach at Southeast Missouri State.

== Head coaching record ==
Record table
Season	Team	Overall	Conference	Standing	Postseason
Minnesota State (North Central Conference) (2001–2008)
2001–02	Minnesota State	9–17	5–13	T–8th	
2002–03	Minnesota State	15–13	6–10	7th	
2003–04	Minnesota State	18–10	7–7	T–4th	
2004–05	Minnesota State	24–8	7–5	T–3rd	NCAA Division II Second Round
2005–06	Minnesota State	24–7	9–3	1st	NCAA Division II Second Round
2006–07	Minnesota State	28–5	10–2	T–1st	NCAA Division II Sweet Sixteen
2007–08	Minnesota State	22–7	11–1	T–1st	NCAA Division II First Round
Minnesota State (Northern Sun Intercollegiate Conference) (2008–present)
2008–09	Minnesota State	26–9	14–6	T–3rd	NCAA Division II Second Round
2009–10	Minnesota State	25–5	17–3	1st	NCAA Division II Second Round
2010–11	Minnesota State	28–5	19–3	1st	NCAA Division II Final Four
2011–12	Minnesota State	7–19	6–15	13th	
2012–13	Minnesota State	28–5	18–4	1st / 1st (South)	NCAA Division II Sweet Sixteen
2013–14	Minnesota State	30–5	19–3	1st / 1st (South)	NCAA Division II Second Round
2014–15	Minnesota State	24–8	17–5	3rd / 2nd (South)	NCAA Division II First Round
2015–16	Minnesota State	22–10	15–7	3rd / 2nd (South)	NCAA Division II Second Round
2016–17	Minnesota State	21–10	14–8	T–6th / 4th (South)	
2017–18	Minnesota State	24–10	16–6	4th / 2nd (South)	NCAA Division II Sweet Sixteen
2018–19	Minnesota State	18–12	14–8	T–3rd / T–1st (South)	NCAA Division II First Round
2019–20	Minnesota State	17–15	12–10	8th / 5th (South)	NCAA Division II canceled
2020–21	Minnesota State	10–7	9–5	3rd (South)	
2021–22	Minnesota State	16–10	9–9	T–8th / T–5th (South)	
2022–23	Minnesota State	17–12	11–11	T–9th / T–5th (South)	
2023–24	Minnesota State	35–2	20–2	1st	NCAA Division II Champion
2024–25	Minnesota State	20–12	15–7	T–3rd	
2025–26	Minnesota State	21–12	13–9	T–5th / 5th (South)	
2026–27	Minnesota State	4–1	0–0		
Minnesota State:		533–236 (.693)	259–122 (.680)		
Total:		533–236 (.693)			
National champion Postseason invitational champion Conference regular season champion Conference regular season and conference tournament champion Division regular season champion Division regular season and conference tournament champion Conference tournament champion
