= Dale Wellman =

American Basketball Coach

Current position
- Title: Head coach
- Team: Nebraska Wesleyan
- Conference: American Rivers
- Record: 232–83 (.737)

Biographical details
- Born: Versailles, Kentucky
- Education: Sewanee; Eastern Kentucky

Playing career
- 1996–1999: Sewanee

Coaching career (HC unless noted)
- 2002–2003: Kenyon (assistant)
- 2003–2004: Union (assistant)
- 2004–2006: Eastern Kentucky (assistant)
- 2006–2008: Williams (assistant)
- 2008–2014: Alfred
- 2014–present: Nebraska Wesleyan

Head coaching record
- Overall: 299–169 (.639)

Accomplishments and honors

Championships
- 2018 NCAA Division III National Champion; 6x IIAC/A-R-C Regular Season (2017, 2018, 2019, 2020, 2024, 2026); 3x IIAC/A-R-C Tournament (2018, 2019, 2020)

Awards
- 2018 DIII NABC Coach of the Year; 5x IIAC/A-R-C Coach of the Year (2017, 2018, 2019, 2020, 2024); 2014 Empire 8 Coach of the Year

Dale Wellman is an American college basketball coach. He is the current head men's basketball coach at Nebraska Wesleyan University in Lincoln, Nebraska.

== Playing career ==
Wellman, a Kentucky native, played college basketball and baseball at The University of the South in Sewanee, Tennessee. During his playing career his teams qualified for two NCAA Division III basketball tournaments in 1997 and 1998, and he was an all-conference player in baseball.

== Coaching career ==
=== Alfred College ===
Wellman became the head coach of Alfred University prior to the 2008–09 season. In his final season with the Saxons he led them to a 18–7 record, their best season since 1988–89. He was named the Empire 8 coach of the year and qualified for their first ever Empire 8 men's basketball tournament. He resigned from his post in June 2014.

=== Nebraska Wesleyan ===
Wellman was named the 23rd head men's basketball coach in NWU history in June 2014. In just his second season with the Prairie Wolves he led them back to the postseason for the first time since 2001, with a birth into the NAIA DII men's basketball tournament. In 2018, Wellman led the team to the NCAA DII national title with 78–72 win over Wisconsin-Oshkosh. They finished the year with a program record 30 wins and secured the programs first national title. The 2018 season was the second conference title in a row for Wellman, a streak that would with 4 straight in 2020. Following his 2018 campaign, Wellman was named the DIII national coach of the year by the National Association of Basketball Coaches. The 2023–24 season Wellman won his 5th American Rivers Conference championship and returned NCAA DIII elite eight.

== Head coaching record ==
Record table
Season	Team	Overall	Conference	Standing	Postseason
Alfred Saxons (Empire 8) (2008–2014)
2008–09	Alfred	7–17	3–11		
2009–10	Alfred	11–14	5–11		
2010–11	Alfred	8–17	3–13	6th	
2011–12	Alfred	15–11	6–8	5th	
2012–13	Alfred	7–18	3–11	8th	
2013-14	Alfred	18-9	9-5	4th	
Alfred:		67–86 (.438)	29–60 (.326)		
Nebraska Wesleyan Prairie Wolves (Great Plains Athletic Conference) (2014–2016)
2014–15	Nebraska Wesleyan	13–13	8–12	5th	
2015–16	Nebraska Wesleyan	22-8	15-5	2nd	NAIA First Round
Nebraska Wesleyan Prairie Wolves (Iowa Intercollegiate Athletic Conference) (2016–2018)
2016–17	Nebraska Wesleyan	18–8	11–5	T–1st	
2017–18	Nebraska Wesleyan	30–3	13–3	1st	NCAA National Champion
Nebraska Wesleyan Prairie Wolves (American Rivers Conference) (2018–Present)
2018–19	Nebraska Wesleyan	27–2	15–1	1st	NCAA Second Round
2019–20	Nebraska Wesleyan	25–4	15–1	1st	NCAA Second Round
2020–21	Nebraska Wesleyan	3–3	1–2	8th	No postseason; COVID-19
2021–22	Nebraska Wesleyan	14–12	8–8	6th	
2022-23	Nebraska Wesleyan	16-10	11-5	3rd	
2023-24	Nebraska Wesleyan	26-5	13-3	T-1st	NCAA Elite Eight
2024–25	Nebraska Wesleyan	20–7	12–4	2nd	
2025–26	Nebraska Wesleyan	18–8	13–3	1st	
Nebraska Wesleyan:		232–83 (.737)	139–53 (.724)		
Total:		299–169 (.639)			
National champion Postseason invitational champion Conference regular season champion Conference regular season and conference tournament champion Division regular season champion Division regular season and conference tournament champion Conference tournament champion
