= Emporia State Hornets basketball =

Emporia State Hornets
2024–25 Emporia State Hornets basketball team
- University: Emporia State University
- First season: 1901
- All-time record: 1510–1255 (.546)
- Athletic director: Steve Rodecap
- Head coach: Tom Billeter (1st season)
- Conference: The MIAA
- Location: Emporia, Kansas
- Arena: William L. White Auditorium (capacity: 5,000)
- Nickname: Hornets
- Student section: E-Zone
- Colors: Black and gold

Uniforms
Home	Away	Alternate

NCAA tournament appearances
- 2004, 2007, 2023

Conference regular-season champions
- 1946, 1947, 1948, 1956, 1960, 1963, 1985, 1988

The Emporia State Hornets basketball team represents Emporia State University in Emporia, Kansas, in the NCAA Division II men's basketball competition. The team is coached by Tom Billeter, who is in his first season as head coach. The Hornets compete in the Mid-America Intercollegiate Athletics Association.

The basketball team plays its home games in William L. White Auditorium downtown Emporia. Since joining the NCAA in 1991, Emporia State has only been to the NCAA Tournament twice: 2004 and 2007.

== Overview ==
The Emporia State Hornets team annually plays a nineteen-game conference schedule that is preceded by an out-of-conference schedule that includes one exhibition game between the Kansas Jayhawks or the Kansas State Wildcats, switching every other year. The conference schedule consists of playing every MIAA member at least once, some twice. Emporia State does, however, play the Washburn Ichabods in the rivalry known as the Turnpike Tussle and the Pittsburg State Gorillas.

== History ==
Emporia State Coaching History
Tenure	Coach	Won	Lost	Pct.
1901–1907	Carney	10	21	.323
1907–1909	Sampson	20	8	.714
1909–1912	Honhart	27	10	.730
1912–1914	Crispin	14	17	.452
1914–1916, 1917–1918, 1922–1923	Hargiss	47	19	.712
1916–1917	McChesney	11	5	.688
No team (WWI) 1917–1920
1920–1922	Schabinger	24	9	.727
1923–25, 1927–1936	Trusler	84	59	.587
1925–1927	McGahn	22	13	.629
1936–1943	Kutnick	66	60	.524
No team (WWII) 1943–1946
1946–1970	Fish	323	279	.537
1970–1998	Slaymaker	452	348	.565
1998–2001	Comstock	33	49	.402
2001–2011	Moe	162	126	.563
2011–2018	Vandiver	87	112	.437
2018–2024	Doty	97	76	.561
2024–present	Tom Billeter	0	0	–
Total: 122 seasons	19 coaches	1,510–1,255		.546

Emporia State's basketball program was founded in 1901, thirty-eight years after the university was founded. Since 1901, the Hornets have belonged to six conferences. When the school was a National Association of Intercollegiate Athletics, they participated in the Kansas Collegiate Athletic Conference, Central Intercollegiate Athletic Conference, Rocky Mountain Athletic Conference, Great Plains Athletic Conference, and the Central States Intercollegiate Conference. When the university was recognized as an NCAA Division II school in 1991, they joined the Mid-America Intercollegiate Athletics Association (MIAA).

=== 1901–1918 ===
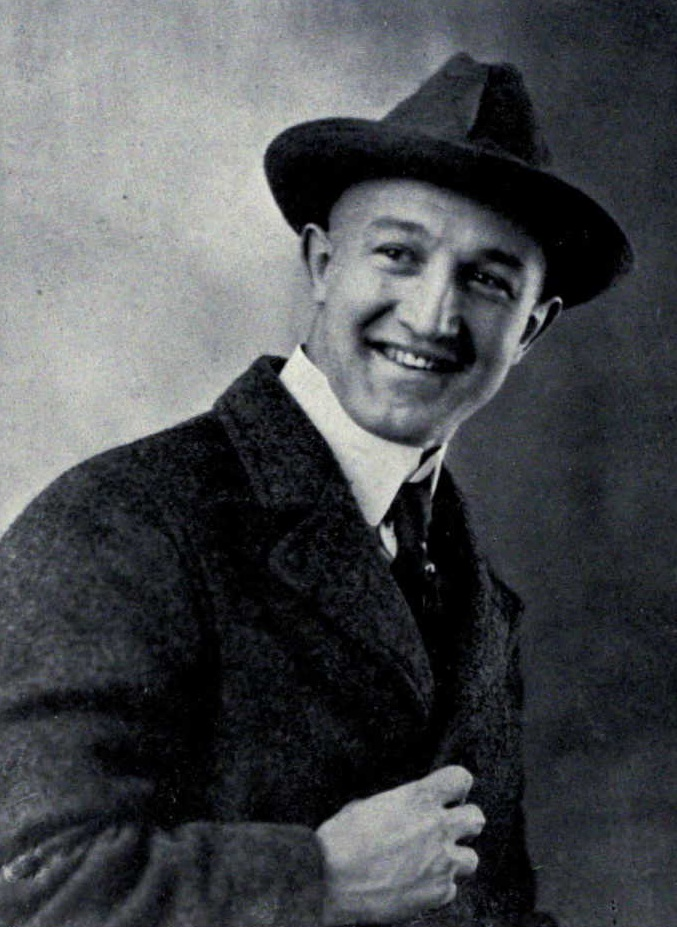
Homer Woodson Hargiss

Earl Carney was the first coach, earning a 10–29 record over six seasons from 1901 to 1907. The inaugural game was a 12–13 loss to the Florence Opera House, a team from Florence, Kansas. ESU would then clinch their first ever victory against the Florence Opera House later that year – 35–21. For the next two seasons, Paul Sampson took over the helm of the program, compiling a 20–8 record. Following Sampson was Fred Honhart for three seasons, who led the Normals (as the school's teams were known until 1921) to a 27–10 record from 1909 to 1912. From 1912 until 1918, Emporia State went through three coaches with a combined record of 58–45: George Crispin (1912–1914), Homer Woodson Hargiss (1914–1916, 1917–1918) and H. D. McChesney from 1916 to 1917. Due to World War I, Emporia State did not have a team from 1918 to 1920.

Statistics overview
1901–1918 — Year-by-year record
Season	Team	Overall	Conference	Standing	Postseason
Earl Carney (Kansas Conference) (1901–1907)
1901–02	Earl Carney	1–1			
1902–03	Earl Carney	2–1			
1903–04	Earl Carney	2–4			
1904–05	Earl Carney	1–6			
1905–06	Earl Carney	2–8			
1906–07	Earl Carney	2–9			
Earl Carney:		10–29			
Paul Sampson (Kansas Conference) (1907–1909)
1907–08	Paul Sampson	9–4			
1908–09	Paul Sampson	11–4			
Paul Sampson:		20–8			
Fred Honhart (Kansas Conference) (1909–1912)
1909–10	Fred Honhart	6–6			
1910–11	Fred Honhart	9–3			
1911–12	Fred Honhart	12–1			
Fred Honhart:		27–10			
George Crispin (Kansas Conference) (1912–1914)
1912–13	George Crispin	6–7			
1913–14	George Crispin	8–10			
George Crispin:		14–17			
Homer Woodson Hargiss (Kansas Conference) (1914–1916)
1914–15	Homer Woodson Hargiss	14–3			
1915–16	Homer Woodson Hargiss	15–4			
Homer Woodson Hargiss:		29–7			
H. D. McChesney (Kansas Conference) (1916–1917)
1916–17	H. D. McChesney	11–5			
H. D. McChesney:		11–5			
Homer Woodson Hargiss (Kansas Conference) (1917–1918)
1917–18	Homer Woodson Hargiss	5–5			
Homer Woodson Hargiss:		5–5			
No team (WWI) (1918–1920)
Total:		116–81			
National champion Postseason invitational champion Conference regular season champion Conference regular season and conference tournament champion Division regular season champion Division regular season and conference tournament champion Conference tournament champion

=== 1920–1943 ===
In 1920, Emporia State resumed sports after World War I ended. A.A. Schabinger, also known as Arthur Schabinger, led the Normals from 1920 to 1922. He had a combined record of 24–9. Homer Woodson Hargiss was the head basketball coach at Emporia State three times—first from 1914 to 1916, then from 1917 to 1918 and then from 1922 to 1923. During his total of four seasons, he garnered a record of 47–19. Vic Trusler was the only other coach at Emporia State to serve more than one time as the head basketball coach at the school. After having Schabinger and Hargiss at the helm, Trusler took the job from 1923 to 1925 and then again from 1927 to 1936. After serving as coach for two seasons, Lloyd McGahn took the job for only two seasons with a combined record of 22–13. After McGhan left in 1925, Trusler again took the job, remaining in that position until 1936. He departed after leading his teams to 84 wins, 59 losses. From 1936 to 1943, Paul Kutnick lead the Hornets with a 66–60 record. Due to World War II, ESU had no team from 1943 to 1946.

Statistics overview
1920–1943 — Year-by-year record
Season	Team	Overall	Conference	Standing	Postseason
A.A. Schabinger (Kansas Conference) (1920–1922)
1920–21	A.A. Schabinger	13–4			
1921–22	A.A. Schabinger	11–5			
A.A. Schabinger:		24–9			
Homer Woodson Hargiss (Kansas Conference) (1922–1923)
1922–23	Homer Woodson Hargiss	13–7			
Homer Woodson Hargiss:		13–7			
Vic Trusler (Kansas Conference) (1923–1925)
1923–24	Vic Trusler	16–5			
1924–25	Vic Trusler	6–9			
Vic Trusler:		22–14			
Lloyd McGahn (Kansas Conference) (1925–1927)
1925–26	Lloyd McGahn	7–9			
1926–27	Lloyd McGahn	15–4			
Lloyd McGahn:		22–13			
Vic Trusler (Central Intercollegiate Athletic Conference) (1927–1936)
1927–28	Vic Trusler	9–5			
1928–29	Vic Trusler	14–5			
1929–30	Vic Trusler	13–5			
1930–31	Vic Trusler	7–12			
1931–32	Vic Trusler	9–7			
1932–33	Vic Trusler	5–12			
1933–34	Vic Trusler	17–1			
1934–35	Vic Trusler	11–8			
1935–36	Vic Trusler	N/A			
Vic Trusler:		62–45			
Paul Kutnick (Central Intercollegiate Athletic Conference) (1936–1943)
1936–37	Paul Kutnick	5–14			
1937–38	Paul Kutnick	10–10			
1938–39	Paul Kutnick	14–5			
1939–40	Paul Kutnick	9–9			
1940–41	Paul Kutnick	10–7			
1941–42	Paul Kutnick	13–5			
1942–43	Paul Kutnick	5–10			
Vic Trusler:		66–60			
No team (WWII) (1943–1945)
Total:		209–148			
National champion Postseason invitational champion Conference regular season champion Conference regular season and conference tournament champion Division regular season champion Division regular season and conference tournament champion Conference tournament champion

=== 1945–1998 ===
After starting the sports programs back up after World War II, Gus Fish served as head coach from 1946 to 1970 compiling a record of 323–279 (.537) record. Fish led the Hornets to six conference championships, tied for another, and made six appearances in the NAIA national tournament, placing fourth in 1946 and 1964. While at ESU, Fish also served as the president of the NAIA in 1955 and helped establish the NAIA track & field program. In 1960, Fish assisted with the U.S. Olympic basketball team as well as became a member of the National Association of Intercollegiate Athletics Hall of Fame. Until 1990, Fish was the all-time winningest coach at Emporia State.

Ron Slaymaker took over the program when Gus Fish retired in 1970. Slaymaker is the winningest coach in Emporia State history, with a record of 452–348 (.565). After coaching for 28 years, Slaymaker's teams won a conference title five times and a district championship on four occasions. In 1986, his 31–5 record led him to be named the National Coach of the Year in the NAIA. He earned Coach of the Year for District 10 six times. Slaymaker served as an assistant coach for the U.S. Olympic Festival and the World University Games in the late 1980s. Slaymaker served as a member of the 1988 Olympic Basketball Selection Committee. He also led Emporia State to four NAIA National Tournament appearances.

Statistics overview
1945–1998 — Year-by-year record
Season	Team	Overall	Conference	Standing	Postseason
Gus Fish (Central Intercollegiate Athletic Conference/Rocky Mountain Athletic Conference) (1945–1970)
1945–46	Gus Fish	11–6			
1946–47	Gus Fish	18–9			
1947–48	Gus Fish	20–7			
1948–49	Gus Fish	19–10			
1949–50	Gus Fish	14–12			
1950–51	Gus Fish	8–8			
1951–52	Gus Fish	7–18			
1952–53	Gus Fish	13–13			
1953–54	Gus Fish	7–14			
1954–55	Gus Fish	10–17			
1955–56	Gus Fish	11–14			
1956–57	Gus Fish	24–7			
1957–58	Gus Fish	13–6			
1958–59	Gus Fish	16–8			
1959–60	Gus Fish	14–6			
1960–61	Gus Fish	17–6			
1961–62	Gus Fish	14–9			
1962–63	Gus Fish	14–11			
1963–64	Gus Fish	22–9			
1964–65	Gus Fish	9–13			
1965–66	Gus Fish	9–11			
1966–67	Gus Fish	8–18			
Rocky Mountain Athletic Conference
1967–68	Gus Fish	12–12			
1968–69	Gus Fish	10–15			
1969–70	Gus Fish	3–20			
Gus Fish:		323–279			
Ron Slaymaker (RMAC/Great Plains Athletic Conference) (1970–1976)
1970–71	Ron Slaymaker	13–13			
1971–72	Ron Slaymaker	14–11			
Great Plains Athletic Conference
1972–73	Ron Slaymaker	9–16			
1973–74	Ron Slaymaker	18–8			
1974–75	Ron Slaymaker	12–14			
1975–76	Ron Slaymaker	16–11			
Central States Intercollegiate Conference
1976–77	Ron Slaymaker	24–6			
1977–78	Ron Slaymaker	19–11			
1978–79	Ron Slaymaker	12–17			
1979–80	Ron Slaymaker	12–17			
1980–81	Ron Slaymaker	12–20			
1981–82	Ron Slaymaker	19–15			
1982–83	Ron Slaymaker	17–15			
1983–84	Ron Slaymaker	17–15			
1984–85	Ron Slaymaker	24–9			
1985–86	Ron Slaymaker	31–5			
1986–87	Ron Slaymaker	18–14			
1987–88	Ron Slaymaker	22–10			
NCAA Independent
1988–89	Ron Slaymaker	22–11			
1989–90	Ron Slaymaker	25–9			
1990–91	Ron Slaymaker	18–14			
Mid-America Intercollegiate Athletics Association
1991–92	Ron Slaymaker	18–14			
1992–93	Ron Slaymaker	18–9			
1993–94	Ron Slaymaker	16–11			
1994–95	Ron Slaymaker	6–19			
1995–96	Ron Slaymaker	12–15			
1996–97	Ron Slaymaker	15–12			
1997–98	Ron Slaymaker	6–20			
Ron Slaymaker:		452–348			
Total:		775–627			
National champion Postseason invitational champion Conference regular season champion Conference regular season and conference tournament champion Division regular season champion Division regular season and conference tournament champion Conference tournament champion

=== Program declines: 1998–2011 ===
After Slaymaker's retirement, Marc Comstock took over the job. After going 33–49 at Emporia State in three years, his contract was not renewed in 2001. Following Comstock was David Moe, son of former NBA player and coach, Doug Moe. In his ten seasons from 2001 to 2011, he led ESU to the NCAA Tournament in 2004 and 2007 and is one of just three coaches to take his team to every MIAA Post Season Tournament held in Kansas City. Those teams advanced to the semifinals of the tournament in four of the last six years. Moe is third most winningest coach in ESU history behind ESU Hall of Honor members Gus Fish and Ron Slaymaker, with a record of 162–126.

Statistics overview
1998–2011 — Year-by-year record
Season	Team	Overall	Conference	Standing	Postseason
Marc Comstock (Mid-America Intercollegiate Athletics Association) (1998–2001)
1998–99	Marc Comstock	10–16			
1999–2000	Marc Comstock	14–16			
2000–01	Marc Comstock	9–17			
Marc Comstock:		33–49			
David Moe (MIAA) (2001–2011)
2001–02	David Moe	7–19			
2002–03	David Moe	16–12			
2003–04	David Moe	22–7			
2004–05	David Moe	16–12			
2005–06	David Moe	18–13			
2006–07	David Moe	21–8			
2007–08	David Moe	14–16			
2008–09	David Moe	18–10			
2009–10	David Moe	14–15			
2010–11	David Moe	16–14			
David Moe:		162–126			
Total:		195–175			
National champion Postseason invitational champion Conference regular season champion Conference regular season and conference tournament champion Division regular season champion Division regular season and conference tournament champion Conference tournament champion

=== Former pro player takes over: 2011–2018 ===
In April 2011, Shaun Vandiver was hired as Emporia State's next coach. Vandiver returned to Wyoming as an assistant coach in April 2018. Vandiver ended with an overall record of 87–111, and a record of 51–90 in the MIAA.

Statistics overview
2011–2018 — Year-by-year record
Season	Team	Overall	Conference	Standing	Postseason
Shaun Vandiver (MIAA) (2011–2018)
2011–12	Shaun Vandiver	9–18	5–17		
2012–13	Shaun Vandiver	13–14	8–11		
2013–14	Shaun Vandiver	18–13	10–10		
2014–15	Shaun Vandiver	12–16	5–14		
2015–16	Shaun Vandiver	13–16	10–12		
2016–17	Shaun Vandiver	13–16	9–11		
2017–18	Shaun Vandiver	9–19	4–15		
Emporia State:		87–112	51–90		
Total:		87–112			
National champion Postseason invitational champion Conference regular season champion Conference regular season and conference tournament champion Division regular season champion Division regular season and conference tournament champion Conference tournament champion

=== Three-time national champion takes reigns: 2018–present ===
In April 2018, Craig Doty, a three-time national championship coach, was hired as Emporia State's next coach. Under his direction, the Hornets returned to the NCAA Tournament in 2023 for the first time since 2007. Following the 2023–24 season, Doty resigned to take over the program at NCAA DI member Houston Christian. Doty departed as the only head coach in program history to lead the team to four consecutive seasons at .500 or better in MIAA play.

Statistics overview
Season	Team	Overall	Conference	Standing	Postseason
Craig Doty (Mid-America Intercollegiate Athletics Association) (2018–present)
2018–19	Emporia State	14–16	8–11	T–8th	
2019–20	Emporia State	10–18	4–15	T–13th	
2020–21	Emporia State	11–12	11–11	T–6th	
2021–22	Emporia State	20–9	15–7	5th	
2022–23	Emporia State	23–9	15–7	T–3rd	NCAA Tournament Second Round
2023-24	Emporia State	19-12	12-10	T-6th	
Emporia State:		97–76 (.561)	65–61 (.516)		
Total:		259–126 (.673)			
National champion Postseason invitational champion Conference regular season champion Conference regular season and conference tournament champion Division regular season champion Division regular season and conference tournament champion Conference tournament champion

== Record vs. MIAA opponents ==
Emporia State vs. MIAA members
Current MIAA members
Emporia State vs.	First game	Overall record	Last 5 meetings	Last 10 meetings	Current streak	Since joining the MIAA
Central Missouri	1906–07	UCM, 41–72	UCM, 0–5	UCM, 0–10	L 4	UCM, 18–33
Central Oklahoma	1930–31	UCO, 8–21	UCO, 2–3	UCO, 2–8	W 2	UCO, 5–10
Fort Hays State	1916–17	FHSU, 86–100	FHSU, 0–5	FHSU, 0–10	L 5	FHSU, 8–19
Lincoln^{†}	1992–93	ESU, 18–9	ESU, 3–2	LU, 5–5	L 1	ESU, 8–4^{‡}
Lindenwood	2012–13	LWU, 3–4	LWU, 2–3	LWU, 3–4	W 1	LWU, 3–4
Missouri Southern	1968–69	MSSU, 31–53	MSSU, 1–4	MSSU, 1–9	L 3	MSSU, 20–32
Missouri Western	1976–77	MWSU, 42–44	ESU, 3–2	ESU, 7–3	W 1	MWSU, 19–34
Nebraska–Kearney	1974–75	UNK, 20–23	ESU, 3–2	ESU, 8–2	L 1	Tied, 6–6
Northeastern State	1952–53	ESU, 12–7	NSU, 4–1	NSU, 6–4	W 3	NSU, 6–7
Northwest Missouri State	1926–27	NWM, 24–43	NWM, 0–5	NWM, 0–10	L 5	NWM, 16–30
Pittsburg State	1919–20	ESU, 99–95	PSU, 2–3	PSU, 4–6	L 3	PSU, 21–25
Washburn	1905–06	WU, 104–108	WU, 1–4	WU, 2–8	L 1	WU, 18–37

== Venue and culture ==
=== Home arena ===
Since 1940, home basketball games have been played at William L. White Auditorium, a 5,000-seat arena which is named after William Lindsay White, son of William Allen White. The auditorium is also home to the men's basketball team and the Lady Hornets volleyball team since the program started in 1973. In 2008, White Auditorium received an upgrade with a new scoreboard and video board, as well as a new color scheme on the arena floor and the throughout the entire building.

==== School colors ====
Black	Gold

Emporia State's official school colors are black and gold. They have been the colors since the school was founded in 1863, and until recently, the gold was Old gold.

=== Mascot ===
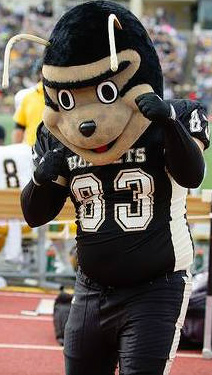
Corky the Hornet at an Emporia State football game.

Corky the Hornet is Emporia State University's mascot. In 1923 when the Emporia State was named to the Kansas State Teachers College, the athletic teams were called the "Yaps". Many people, including most Emporia State coach Vic Trusler, did not like the name. Trusler suggested to a writer at the Emporia Gazette that the new name should be the "Yellow Jackets". But due to the lack of newspaper space, the name changed to "Hornets".

In 1933, the Teachers College had a student contest where students and staff could design a mascot for the college. Sophomore Paul Edwards, who graduated in 1937, designed Corky. Although hundreds of drawings were submitted, Edwards' Corky, a "human-like" hornet was selected. Corky was published in The Bulletin, the student newspaper for Emporia State University.
