= Dan McCarrell =

Retired men's basketball coach

- Born: June 11, 1938 (age 88); Cicero, Illinois, U.S.
- Occupation: Head Basketball Coach
- Employer(s): North Park College; Minnesota State University, Mankato
- Known for: 3x NCAA Division III national champion (coach)
- Awards: 3x NABC Coach of the Year

Daniel Richard McCarrell Sr. (born 1938) is a retired men's basketball coach who won three national championships at North Park College in Chicago, Illinois.

== Career ==
McCarrell led North Park College to three consecutive National Collegiate Athletic Association (NCAA) Division III Men's National Championships in 1978, 1979 and 1980. Thereafter, he coached at Minnesota State University, Mankato, from 1984 to 2001.

== Honors ==
McCarrell was named the National Association of Basketball Coaches (NABC) Coach of the Year in 1978, 1979 and 1980. He was inducted into the Illinois Basketball Coaches Association (IBCA) Hall of Fame in 1985; the North Park University Hall of Fame in 1988; the Minnesota State University, Mankato, Hall of Fame in 2009; and the Small College Basketball Hall of Fame in 2025. He also received the IBCA Tom "Buzzy" O'Connor Award in 1980.
