= Southeastern Community College (Iowa) =

College in Burlington and Keokuk, Iowa, US

Coordinates: 40.81°N 91.174°W

- Former names: Burlington Junior College (1920–1961); Burlington Community College (1961–1967); Keokuk Community College (1953–1967)
- Type: Public community college
- Established: 1967; 59 years ago
- President: Michael Ash
- Students: 3,601
- Location: Burlington and Keokuk, Iowa, U.S.
- Colors: Red and black
- Nickname: Blackhawks
- Sporting affiliations: NJCAA Division I Iowa Community College Athletic Conference
- Website: www.scciowa.edu

Southeastern Community College is a public community college in Iowa with two campuses, one in Burlington and one in Keokuk.

== History ==
Southeastern Community College was formed in 1967 with the merging of two local colleges: Burlington Junior College, founded in 1920, and Keokuk Community College, founded in 1953.

== Campus ==
The college also has a regional center in Mount Pleasant and a downtown Burlington site, which houses the Center for Business and Industry Services. The West Burlington campus serves as the administrative center and main campus.

== Academics ==
Southeastern is accredited by the Higher Learning Commission.

== Athletics ==
The West Burlington campus offers men's basketball, men's baseball, women's softball, golf, and women's volleyball. Women's basketball is offered at the Keokuk campus. These teams have enjoyed much success, including three men's basketball championships (2000, 2003, 2004) and one softball national championship (2003). The school mascot is Champ the Blackhawk.

== Notable alumni and staff ==
- Bobby Joe Hill, starting point guard on Texas Western's historic 1965-1966 NCAA Championship-winning team
- Ivan Almonte, professional basketball player
- Kyle Amendt, professional baseball player
- Eulis Baez, professional basketball player
- Joe O'Brien, college basketball coach
- Fred Brown, professional basketball player
- Jeff Kurtz, member of the Iowa House of Representatives
- Jeff Reichman, member of the Iowa Senate
- Kim Reynolds, 43rd governor of Iowa and 46th lieutenant governor of Iowa
- Matthew Rinker, member of the Iowa House of Representatives
- Filiberto Rivera, professional basketball player
- Devon Rouse, professional racecar driver
- Jimson St. Louis, professional football player
- Winston Garland, professional basketball player
- Doug Thomas, professional basketball player
- Sam Williams, professional basketball player
