= Fred Honhart =

American football and basketball coach (1885–1983)

Biographical details
- Born: May 31, 1885; Warren, Pennsylvania, U.S.
- Died: May 2, 1983 (aged 97); Detroit, Michigan, U.S.

Playing career

Football
- 1905–1907: Springfield

Coaching career (HC unless noted)

Football
- 1909–1911: Kansas State Normal

Basketball
- 1909–1912: Kansas State Normal

Head coaching record
- Overall: 13–8–2 (football)

Frederick L. Honhart (May 31, 1885 – May 2, 1983) was an American college football and college basketball coach. He was the seventh head football coach at Kansas State Normal School—now known as Emporia State University—in Emporia, Kansas, serving for three seasons, from 1909 to 1911, and compiling a record of 13–8–2. He was the son of Charles and Mary Honhart. In 1916, Honhart graduated from the University of Louisville School of Medicine with a medical degree. He moved to Detroit, Michigan later that year to practice medicine, where he remained for most of his life.

In 1918, Honhart was commissioned as a lieutenant in the United States Army. He was stationed at various Army hospitals to do "surgical work". Honhart died on May 2, 1983, at St. John Hospital in Detroit.
