= Alex Galindo =

Puerto Rican basketball player

Personal information
- Born: May 6, 1985 (age 41) Mayagüez, Puerto Rico
- Listed height: 6 ft 8 in (2.03 m)
- Listed weight: 210 lb (95 kg)

Career information
- High school: Saint Benedict's (Newark, New Jersey)
- College: Kansas (2004–2005); Florida International (2006–2009)
- NBA draft: 2009: undrafted
- Playing career: 2009–2019
- Position: Small forward

Career history
- 2009–2011: Indios de Mayagüez
- 2011: Gallitos de Isabela
- 2012: Brujos de Guayama
- 2013–2015: Cangrejeros de Santurce
- 2015–2016: Indios de Mayagüez
- 2016–2018: Vaqueros de Bayamón
- 2018–2019: Boca Juniors
- 2019: Atléticos de San Germán
Medals
Men's Basketball
Representing Puerto Rico
FIBA AmeriCup
| Silver medal – second place | 2013 Venezuela |
Centrobasket
| Gold medal – first place | 2016 Panama |

Alexander Galindo (born May 26, 1985) is a Puerto Rican former professional basketball player. He also was a member of the Puerto Rico National Basketball Team.

== High school career ==
Galindo was a small forward for St. Benedict's in Newark, New Jersey.

== College career ==
Ranked as a top 100 small forward in the U.S., he was initially recruited by University of Texas at El Paso, but played for the Kansas Jayhawks men's basketball team as a freshman. He later transferred to Florida International University.
