= Osasumwen Osaghae =

American basketball player

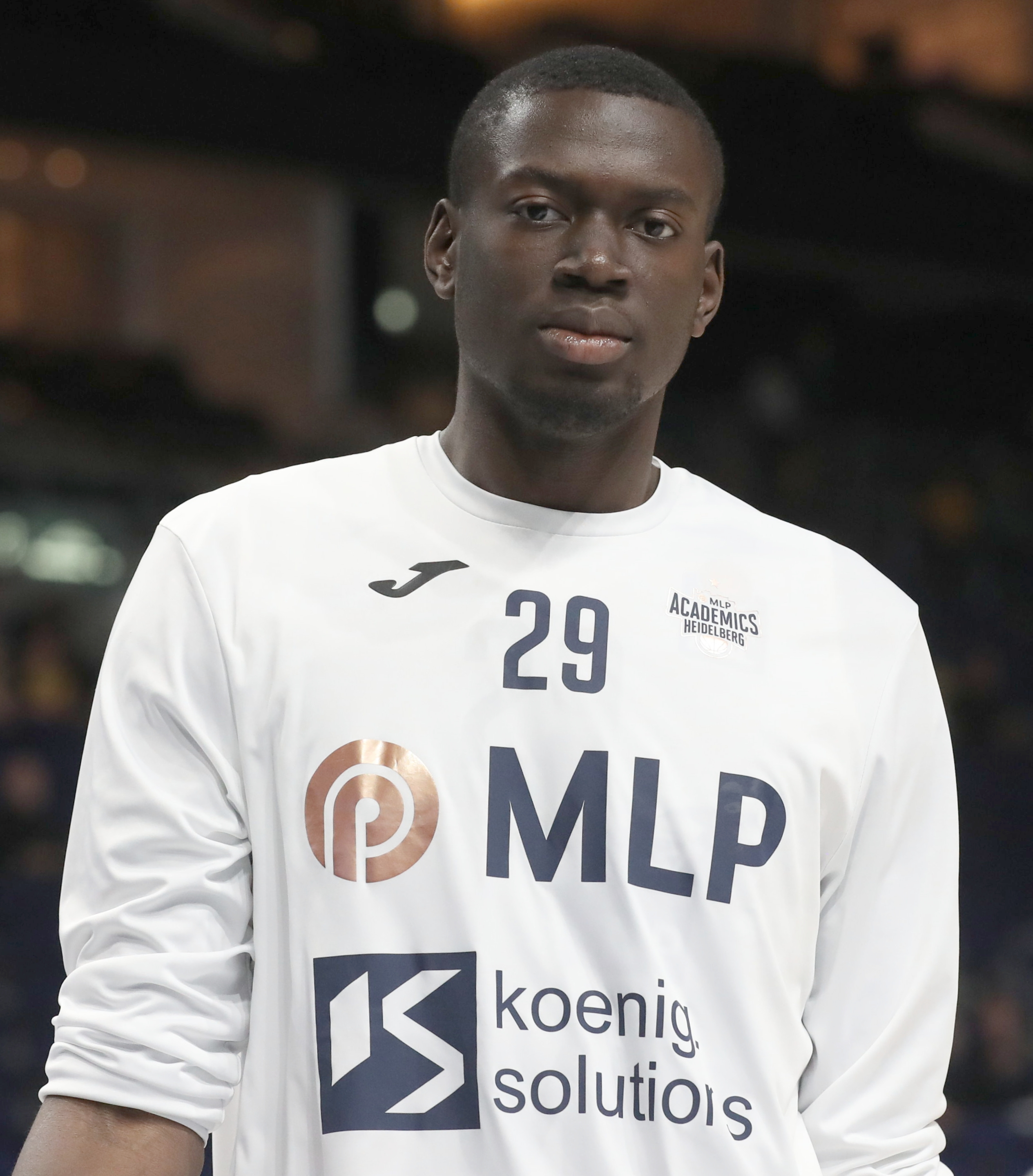
- Osaghae with Heidelberg in 2022

Free Agent
- Position: Power forward

Personal information
- Born: July 29, 1998 (age 28) Miami, Florida
- Listed height: 6 ft 9 in (2.06 m)
- Listed weight: 250 lb (113 kg)

Career information
- High school: Miami Southridge (Miami, Florida)
- College: FIU (2016–2020)
- NBA draft: 2020: undrafted
- Playing career: 2020–present

Career history
- 2020–2021: Kauhajoki Karhu
- 2021–2022: MLP Academics Heidelberg
- 2022–2024: Spirou

Career highlights
- NCAA blocks leader (2020); Second-team All-Conference USA (2020); 2× C-USA All-Defensive Team (2019, 2020)

Osasumwen Osaghae Jr. (born July 29, 1998) is an American basketball player who last played for Spirou of the BNXT League. He played college basketball for the FIU Panthers.

== Early life ==
Osaghae was born in Miami, Florida 20 days after his parents, Osasumwen Sr. and Martina, moved from Nigeria. His name means "God leads me" in a Nigerian dialect. Osaghae grew up playing soccer but reluctantly switched to basketball at age 16 due to his exceptional size after he attended a camp led by Miami Heat coach Erik Spoelstra. Osaghae stood 6'4 by his freshman year of high school. Osaghae played basketball for Miami Southridge High School, coached by John Herron, while attending Robert Morgan Educational Center. He was undisciplined with his eating habits and obese in high school. As a junior, Osaghae quit basketball and wanted to transfer to Palmetto High School because he found Southridge's coach "too hard" on him. He returned to the team as a senior but was often benched for his lack of effort in practice.

== College career ==
By the end of high school, Osaghae weighed nearly 300 lbs. He improved his diet and lost 60 lbs before walking on to the basketball team at Florida International University (FIU), where he studied business management. He played three games as a freshman and was given limited playing time. In his sophomore season, Osaghae averaged 3.3 points, 3.3 rebounds and 1.2 blocks in 11.9 minutes per game. Before his junior year, he was awarded a full scholarship to play for FIU, after contemplating transferring due to the coaching change. Osaghae averaged 8.3 points, 8.5 rebounds and a league-high 3.1 blocks per game en route to Conference USA All-Defensive Team honors. His 96 blocks were the second-most by an FIU player in a single season. His play was hampered by a bone contusion, which forced him to miss three games. As a senior, Osaghae averaged 13 points, 8.1 rebounds and an NCAA Division I-high 3.7 blocks per game. He closed the season as FIU's all-time leading shot blocker and was named second-team All-Conference USA and Conference USA Defensive Player of the Year.

== Professional career ==
On January 2, 2021, Osaghae signed with Kauhajoki Karhu of the Finnish Korisliiga.

On July 23, 2021, Osaghae signed with MLP Academics Heidelberg of the Basketball Bundesliga.

On June 15, 2022, he has signed with Spirou of the BNXT League.

== Personal life ==
Osaghae is the third of five children. His father is a lawyer and his mother is a social worker. His brother, Mark, plays soccer for Johnson & Wales University. His two older sisters, Aiseosa and Karen, are aspiring lawyers. Osaghae is religious and volunteers at churches.
