= Ivan Almonte =

Dominican Republic basketball player

Medal record

Men's basketball

Representing the Dominican Republic

Central American and Caribbean Games
Bronze medal – third place	2006 Colombia	Team

FIBA CBC Championship
Silver medal – second place	2007 Puerto Rico	Team

Radhames Ivan Almonte Rosario (born January 20, 1981) is a professional basketball player from the Dominican Republic.

Ivan Almonte was born in Santo Domingo, Dominican Republic to his father Radhames and mother Altagracia Almonte. His brothers Erick and Hector are also professional baseball players. He is currently divorced and has two young children. Ivan Played basketball and baseball at Liceo Union Panamericana in Santo Domingo where he averaged 25 points and 9 rebounds as a prep senior and once scored 56 points in a single game.

He played with the Dominican National Team at the 2001 Under-21 World Championships and has represented Dominican Republic in other prestigious events as well. From 2002 to 2004, he attended Southeastern Community College in Iowa where he averaged 11.6 points with 7.4 rebounds and 2.7 assists, both years he won the NJCAA national championships under the head coach Joe O'Brien. From 2004 to 2006, Ivan Almonte attended Florida International University, where he averaged 16 points with 10.5 rebounds and 3.2 assists.

He has played professionally in France for the last 4 years and is currently signed with the Boulazac Basket Dordogne for the 2009–2010 season.
