= David Moe (men's basketball) =

American basketball coach

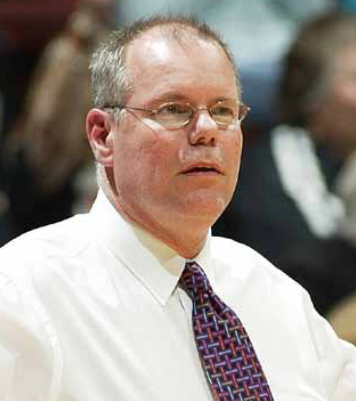
- Moe during a game in 2010

Biographical details
- Born: June 10, 1964 (age 62); Burlington, North Carolina, U.S.
- Education: Texas Lutheran (1986)

Playing career
- 1982–1984: Catawba
- Position: Center

Coaching career (HC unless noted)
- 1987–1988: Kansas (GA)
- 1988–1991: Texas Tech (assistant)
- 1992–1993: Philadelphia 76ers (assistant)
- 1993–2001: Colorado (assistant)
- 2001–2011: Emporia State

Head coaching record
- Overall: 162–126 (.563)
- Tournaments: 0–2 (NCAA DII)

Accomplishments and honors

Awards
- MIAA/Wilson Coach of the Year (2003)

David Edwin Moe (born June 10, 1964) is an American basketball coach, most recently serving as the head coach at Emporia State University from 2001 to 2011. Prior to coaching at Emporia State, Moe has been an assistant coach in the National Basketball Association (NBA), as well as the NCAA Division I.

== Biography ==
Moe, born June 10, 1964, is the son of former NBA coach, Doug Moe. After graduating high school, Moe played two seasons at Catawba College in North Carolina, before transferring to Texas Lutheran University in Texas. In 1987, a year after Moe graduated from college, Moe left for the University of Kansas where he spent a season as a graduate assistant on the 1988 championship team. After a year in Kansas, Moe left to become an assistant coach at Texas Tech University for three years. In 1991, Moe became a regional scout for the Denver Nuggets and Charlotte Hornets. In the 1992 season, Moe was an assistant coach for the Philadelphia 76ers. From 1993 to 2001, Moe served as the assistant coach for the University of Colorado Boulder.

=== Personal life ===
Moe and his wife, Cristi, have three children.

=== Coaching career ===
On March 27, 2001, Moe was named the 16th head men's basketball coach at Emporia State University. During his tenure at Emporia State, Moe was known for having a temper. During the 2003–04 season, Moe led the Hornets to a 22–6 record and finished ranked 22nd in the nation, leading the team to its first-ever NCAA Tournament postseason appearance. In December 2007, Moe was suspended for one game due to getting thrown out of a home game and knocking over the opposing team's water cooler at William L. White Auditorium. Moe stepped down at the end of the 2011 season to move to Delaware where his wife and children live.

== Head coaching record ==
Record table
Season	Team	Overall	Conference	Standing	Postseason
Emporia State Hornets (MIAA) (2001–2011)
2001–02	Emporia State	7–19			
2002–03	Emporia State	16–12			
2003–04	Emporia State	22–6			NCAA DII first round
2004–05	Emporia State	16–12			
2005–06	Emporia State	18–13			
2006–07	Emporia State	21–8			NCAA DII first round
2007–08	Emporia State	14–16			
2008–09	Emporia State	18–10			
2009–10	Emporia State	14–15			
2010–11	Emporia State	16–14			
Total:		162–126			
National champion Postseason invitational champion Conference regular season champion Conference regular season and conference tournament champion Division regular season champion Division regular season and conference tournament champion Conference tournament champion
