= Jerry Welsh (basketball) =

American college basketball coach (1936–2025)

Biographical details
- Born: March 15, 1936
- Died: December 30, 2025 (aged 89)
- Education: Ithaca College (1959); St. Lawrence University (1964)

Playing career

Basketball
- c. 1958: Ithaca

Coaching career (HC unless noted)

Basketball
- c. 1961–1968: Massena HS
- 1968–1970: SUNY Potsdam (assistant)
- 1970–1991: SUNY Potsdam
- 1991–1995: Iona

Baseball
- Massena HS (JV)

Administrative career (AD unless noted)
- 1977–1991: SUNY Potsdam

Accomplishments and honors

Championships
- 2× NCAA Division III tournament (1981, 1986)

Awards
- 2× NABC Division III Coach of the Year (1981, 1986)

Jerry Welsh (March 15, 1936 – December 30, 2025) was an American college basketball coach. He served as the head coach of the SUNY Potsdam Bears from 1970 to 1991 and the Iona Gaels from 1991 to 1995.

== Early life ==
Welsh was born on March 15, 1936, and grew up in Massena, New York. He attended Ithaca College, where he majored in physical education and earned a Bachelor of Science degree in 1959, graduating cum laude. At Ithaca, he served as president of his senior class, vice president of the Phi Epsilon Kappa fraternity and played for the Ithaca Bombers men's basketball team. He later attended St. Lawrence University, earning a master's degree in education in 1964.

== Coaching career ==
After attending Ithaca, Welsh began coaching basketball, being a coach at Massena Central High School by 1961. In addition to basketball, he also coached junior varsity (JV) baseball at Massena, winning the Northern New York JV championship in 1964. In basketball, he posted the best coaching record in the area, leading Massena to several league championships and a perfect season in 1965–66. In his coaching tenure at Massena, he compiled an overall record of 146–32, winning seven Northern League titles. In 1968, he left to become a coach for the SUNY Potsdam Bears.

Initially an assistant, Welsh was named head coach for the Bears starting with the 1970–71 season. He was successful immediately as head coach, and by 1976 had already become the winningest coach in SUNY Potsdam basketball history. In 1977, he received the title of athletic director as well. By 1980, his team had appeared in postseason tournaments six times, including a second-place finish at the 1979 NCAA Division III basketball tournament. In 1981, he led them to the NCAA Division III tournament finals and won by a 67–65 score over Augustana in overtime. Welsh was named the 1981 NABC Division III Coach of the Year.

Five years later, Potsdam won another national championship, posting a perfect 32–0 record during the 1985–86 season, which was the first time any college basketball team had gone undefeated since 1976. Welsh was named the national Division III Coach of the Year for a second time. The Bears afterwards continued their winning streak and did not lose again until midway through the 1986–87 season, having won 60 straight contests, the second-best mark in college basketball history. He remained head coach at Potsdam until 1991, when he left to become head coach of the Iona Gaels, an NCAA Division I program. Across 22 seasons at Potsdam, he posted a record of 494–141, finishing with two national championships, three second-place finishes, nine East Regional championships and regular season championships of the State University of New York Athletic Conference (SUNYAC) in all of his last 15 seasons. He also compiled a record of 254–13 at SUNY Potsdam's home court, which was later renamed to Jerry Welsh Gymnasium in 2001.

At Iona, Welsh was joined by his son Tim as an assistant. He posted a winning record in his second season, but Iona afterwards was plagued by injuries and performed poorly. He resigned due to a heart issue midway through the 1994–95 season and was succeeded by his son as Iona head coach. After retiring from coaching, Welsh served as a scout for the Milwaukee Bucks and taught coaching at Duke University in North Carolina. Across his tenure as head coach of Massena High School, SUNY Potsdam and Iona, he compiled an overall record of 670–199.

== Personal life ==
Welsh was married and had three children, including Tim who was also a basketball coach. He was inducted into the halls of fame at Ithaca, Massena and Potsdam and was inducted into the New York State Basketball Hall of Fame. He was a finalist for induction into the Naismith Basketball Hall of Fame in 2025 and 2026.

Welsh died on December 30, 2025, at the age of 89.
