= Bob Bessoir =

American basketball coach (1932–2020)

Biographical details
- Born: December 29, 1932; Jersey City, New Jersey, U.S.
- Died: December 30, 2020 (aged 88); Glenburn Township, Pennsylvania, U.S.

Playing career
- 1951–1955: Scranton
- Position: Forward

Coaching career (HC unless noted)
- 1958–1972: Scranton (assistant)
- 1972–2001: Scranton

Head coaching record
- Overall: 552–263 (.677)

Accomplishments and honors

Championships
- 2 NCAA Division III Tournament (1976, 1983); 14 Middle Atlantic North/MAC Freedom regular season (1975, 1976, 1978, 1980–1985, 1987, 1988, 1991, 1993, 2000)

Awards
- NABC National Coach of the Year (1983); 4× Middle Atlantic North/MAC Freedom Coach of the Year (1983, 1985, 1993, 2000)

Robert M. Bessoir (December 29, 1932 – December 30, 2020) was an American college basketball coach. He spent his career at his alma mater, the University of Scranton, where he won 552 games and won two NCAA Division III national championships.

== Biography ==
Bessoir was born in Jersey City, New Jersey, and played prep basketball at William L. Dickinson High School. He earned a scholarship to Scranton to play for coach Peter A. Carlesimo. A 6 ft 6 in (1.98 m) forward, he played for the Royals from 1951 to 1955, scoring 1,066 points in his career (then in the top-ten in Scranton history) and set a school record with 43 rebounds in one senior-year game. Following his graduation, Bessoir joined the United States Army.

He returned to his alma mater in 1958 as an assistant basketball coach and in a variety of other athletic roles, serving as head golf coach, head baseball coach for the 1968 season and as sports information director. He received a master's degree from East Stroudsburg University of Pennsylvania in 1968 and served as boys coach for South Catholic High for a time. In 1972, Bessoir was named head coach, replacing Nat Volpe who resigned mid-season.

“Coach Bess” would lead the Royals for 29 seasons and a new level of basketball success for the program. When the NCAA split their “college division” into Division II (which would offer athletic scholarships) and Division III (which would not), Scranton became one of the top teams in Division III. Bessoir's 1974–75 team qualified for the first Division III men's basketball tournament, then the following year won the National championship, defeating Wittenberg 60–57 in overtime in the final. Bessoir's Royals would win another national title in the 1982–83 season with his son Bill as the team's star. Bessoir was named NABC National Coach of the Year for Division III that year.

At the beginning of the 2000–01 season, Bessoir announced that he would retire at the conclusion of the campaign. Bessoir finished his 29-year career with a record of 552–263. His final game as coach was played on February 24, 2001, with a close 86–81 loss to Wilkes University. Bessoir was succeeded by Royals coach Carl Danzig upon his retirement.

Bessoir became the first inductee into the newly created Middle Atlantic Conference Hall of Fame in 2012. He was also inducted into six other basketball halls of fame, including the Chic Feldman Foundation Hall of Fame, the Luzerne County Chapter of the Pennsylvania Sports Hall of Fame, the Northeastern Pennsylvania Sports Hall of Fame, the Pennsylvania State Hall of Fame, the University of Scranton Wall of Fame, and William L. Dickinson High School hall of fame. In 2016, the University of Scranton awarded him the Peter A. Carlesimo Award for contributions to athletics and Catholic education.

Bessoir died on December 30, 2020, at age 88.
