= Craig Doty =

American basketball coach

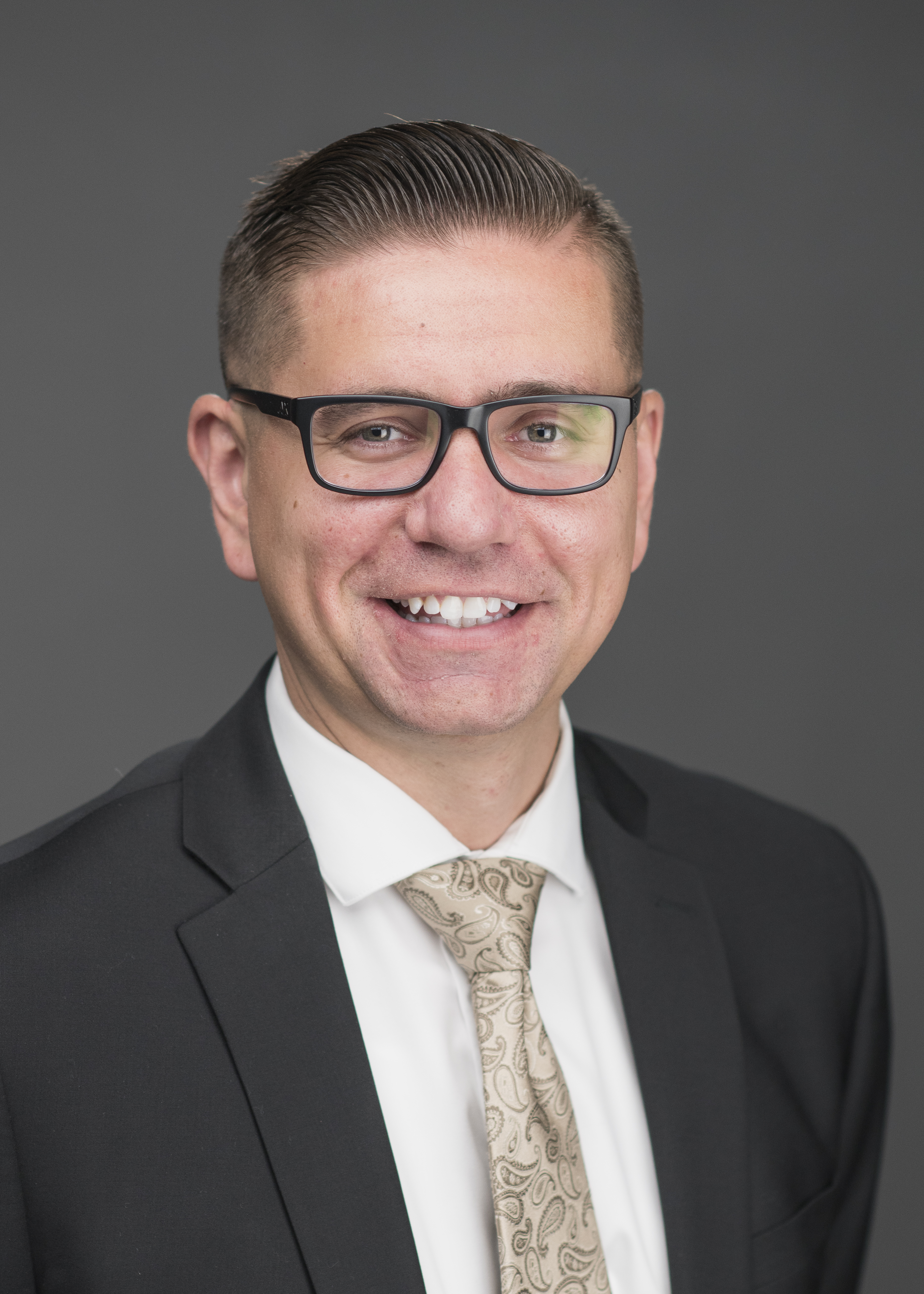

Current position
- Title: Head coach
- Team: Houston Christian
- Conference: Southland
- Record: 24–40 (.375)

Biographical details
- Born: August 27, 1985 (age 40); Sioux Falls, South Dakota, U.S.

Playing career
- 2005–2009: Morningside
- Position: Guard

Coaching career (HC unless noted)
- 2009–2010: Morningside (volunteer asst.)
- 2010–2011: Central Wyoming (asst.)
- 2011–2012: Riverland CC (asst.)
- 2012: Sioux Falls (asst.)
- 2012–2016: Rock Valley
- 2016–2018: Graceland
- 2018–2024: Emporia State
- 2024–present: Houston Christian

Head coaching record
- Overall: 121–116 (.511) (NCAA); 49–22 (.690) (NAIA); 113–28 (.801) (NJCAA)
- Tournaments: 1–1 (NCAA DII); 5–0 (NAIA)

Accomplishments and honors

Championships
- 2 NJCAA Division III national championships (2014, 2016); 2018 NAIA national championship Heart of America Tournament championship

Awards
- 2 Spalding NJCAA Division III Coach of the Year (2014, 2016); NAIA Coach of the Year (2018)

Craig Arthur Doty (born August 27, 1985) is an American college men's basketball coach currently coaching at Houston Christian University. Prior to his current position, Doty was the head coach for Emporia State University from 2018 to 2024. Doty was also the head coach for at Graceland University from 2016 to 2018, where he led the school to its first NAIA national championship, as well as a Heart of America Athletic Conference tournament championship. Doty was the men's basketball head coach at Rock Valley College from 2012 to 2016, where he won two NJCAA Division III championships.

== Career ==
=== Early career ===
Doty, an Alcester, South Dakota native, began his coaching career as a volunteer assistant for Morningside College, where he played on the men's basketball team from 2005 to 2009. After graduating with his master's degree, Doty moved to Wyoming to become the assistant coach for Central Wyoming College, where he would eventually serve as interim head coach for the remaining two months of the 2010–11 season. At the end of the season, Doty left to become an assistant for Riverland Community College for half a season before leaving to become an assistant at the University of Sioux Falls for the remainder of the season.

=== Rock Valley College ===
After serving three seasons as an assistant coach at four schools, Doty was named the head coach at Rock Valley College, a National Junior College Athletic Association Division III school, in 2012. During his four seasons, Doty led the Rock Valley to a record of 113–28 (.801) overall, 41–16 (.719) conference, ending his run with two NJCAA Division III national championships. Doty won his first national championship during his second season in 2013–14 with a record of 30–5, 10–5 conference. The following year, Doty led the Golden Eagles to national runners-up, and won a second national championship during the 2015–16 season.

=== Graceland University ===
Following two national championships in four seasons, Doty was named the head coach for Graceland University in May 2016. During his two-year tenure at Graceland, Doty lead the Yellowjackets to a record of 49–22 (.690) overall, 30–15 (.667) conference, and ended his tenure with his third national championship – Graceland's first – during the 2017–18 season. Graceland won the 2018 Heart of America Athletic Conference Tournament.

=== Emporia State University ===
In April 2018, Doty was named head coach for the Emporia State Hornets basketball team.

=== Houston Christian University ===
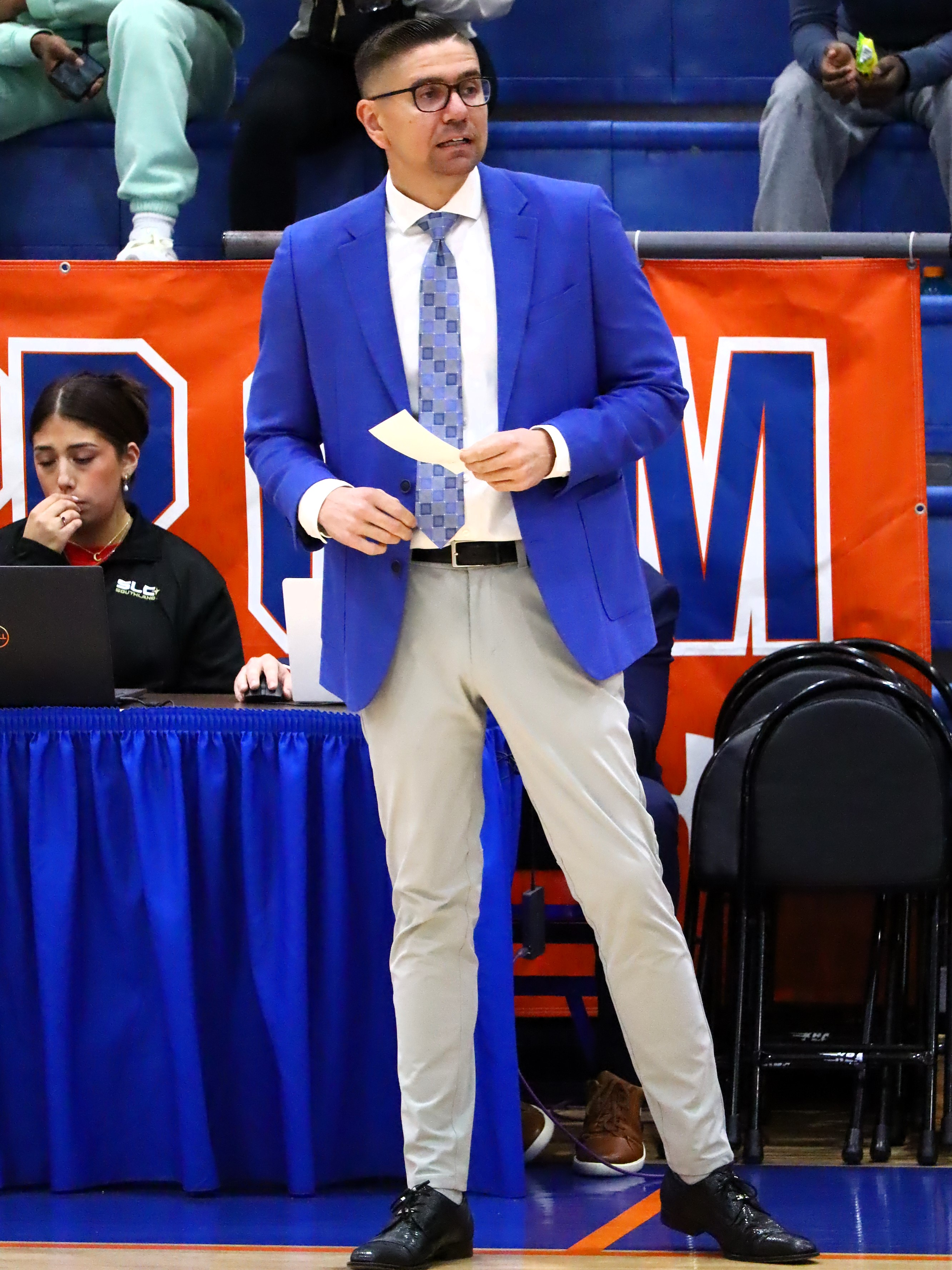
Doty in 2025

On March 15, 2024, it was announced that Doty was leaving his position at Emporia State to become the head coach of the Houston Christian Huskies.

== Head coaching record ==
Statistics overview
| Season | Team | Overall | Conference | Standing | Postseason |
|---|---|---|---|---|---|
Rock Valley Golden Eagles (North Central Community College Conference) (2012–2016)
| 2012–13 | Rock Valley | 19–16 | 7–7 | T–3rd | NJCAA Division III Elite 8 |
| 2013–14 | Rock Valley | 30–5 | 10–5 | T–2nd | NJCAA Division III National Champions |
| 2014–15 | Rock Valley | 31–4 | 13–1 | T–1st | NJCAA Division III runner-up |
| 2015–16 | Rock Valley | 33–3 | 11–3 | 2nd | NJCAA Division III National Champions |
| Rock Valley: | | 113–28 (.801) | 41–16 (.719) | | |
Graceland Yellowjackets (Heart of America Athletic Conference) (2016–2018)
| 2016–17 | Graceland | 20–12 | 16–10 | 1st | |
| 2017–18 | Graceland | 29–10 | 14–5 | 2nd | NAIA National Champions |
| Graceland: | | 49–22 (.690) | 30–15 (.667) | | |
Emporia State Hornets (Mid-America Intercollegiate Athletics Association) (2018–2024)
| 2018–19 | Emporia State | 14–16 | 8–11 | T–8th | |
| 2019–20 | Emporia State | 10–18 | 4–15 | T–13th | |
| 2020–21 | Emporia State | 11–12 | 11–11 | T–6th | |
| 2021–22 | Emporia State | 20–9 | 15–7 | 5th | |
| 2022–23 | Emporia State | 23–9 | 15–7 | T–3rd | NCAA Division II Second Round |
| 2023–24 | Emporia State | 19–12 | 12–10 | T–6th | |
| Emporia State: | | 97–76 (.561) | 65–61 (.516) | | |
Houston Christian Huskies (Southland Conference) (2024–present)
| 2024–25 | Houston Christian | 12–20 | 9–11 | T-7th | |
| 2025–26 | Houston Christian | 12–20 | 8–14 | T-7th | |
| Houston Christian: | | 24–40 (.375) | 17–25 (.405) | | |
| Total: | | 283–161 (.637) | | | |
National champion Postseason invitational champion Conference regular season champion Conference regular season and conference tournament champion Division regular season champion Division regular season and conference tournament champion Conference tournament champion
