= Joe O'Brien (basketball) =

American college basketball coach

Biographical details
- Born: March 13, 1955

Playing career
- 1973–1977: Monmouth College

Coaching career (HC unless noted)
- 1981–1982: Episcopal HS
- 1982–1984: Southeastern Louisiana (asst.)
- 1984–1989: Central Missouri State (asst.)
- 1991–1996: Lincoln College
- 1996–2004: Southeastern CC
- 2004–2005: Florida International (asst.)
- 2006-2011: Idaho State

Joe O'Brien (born March 13, 1955) is an American college basketball coach and the former head men's basketball coach at Idaho State University. He has previously served as an assistant coach at Florida International University in Miami, Florida. On April 18, 2009 he received a three-year contract extension to remain as the head basketball coach at Idaho State. On December 19, 2011 O'Brien stepped down as head coach at Idaho State.

== Head coaching record ==
Record table
Season	Team	Overall	Conference	Standing	Postseason
Idaho State Bengals (Big Sky Conference) (2006–2010)
2006–07	Idaho State	13–17	8–8	T–5th	
2007–08	Idaho State	12–19	8–8	T–4th	
2008–09	Idaho State	13–19	9–7	4th	
2009–10	Idaho State	7–22	4–12	8th	
2010–11	Idaho State	2–8*	0–0		
Idaho State:		47–85 (.356)	29–35 (.453)		
Total:		47–85 (.356)			
National champion Postseason invitational champion Conference regular season champion Conference regular season and conference tournament champion Division regular season champion Division regular season and conference tournament champion Conference tournament champion

- O'Brien resigned after ten games.
