= Chuck Taylor Most Valuable Player Award =

College basketball award

Chuck Taylor MVP Award
- Awarded for: The MVP of the NAIA men's national basketball tournament
- Country: United States
- Presented by: Converse

History
- First award: 1939
- Most recent: Phil Horton, Freed–Hardeman

The Chuck Taylor Most Valuable Player Award was created to honor the most valuable player of the National Association of Intercollegiate Athletics (NAIA) men's basketball national tournaments. Established in 1939 and later named as an homage to the Chuck Taylor All-Stars, an iconic basketball shoe in the early 20th century, it has been awarded every year with the exceptions of 1944 due to World War II and 2020 due to the coronavirus pandemic. Between the 1991–92 and 2019–20 seasons, the NAIA was split into Division I and Division II. Each division subsequently held their own national tournament, with MVPs awarded for them respectively. Starting with the 2020–21 season, the NAIA returned to non-divisional classifications.

== Chuck Taylor MVPs ==
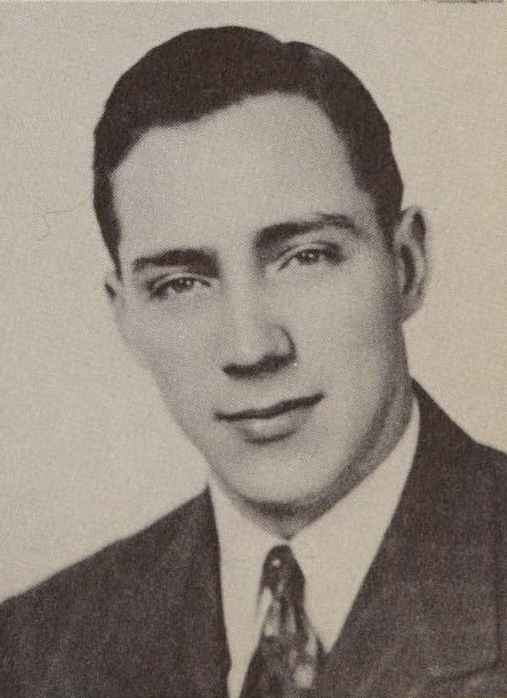
Gus Doerner, Evansville, 1942

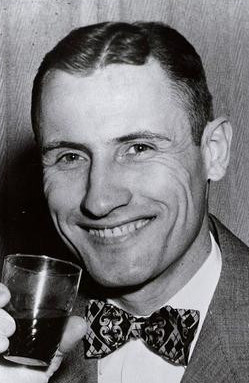
Belus Smawley, Appalachian State, 1943

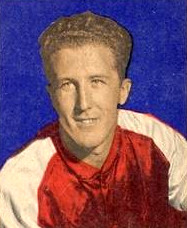
Fred Lewis, Eastern Kentucky, 1945

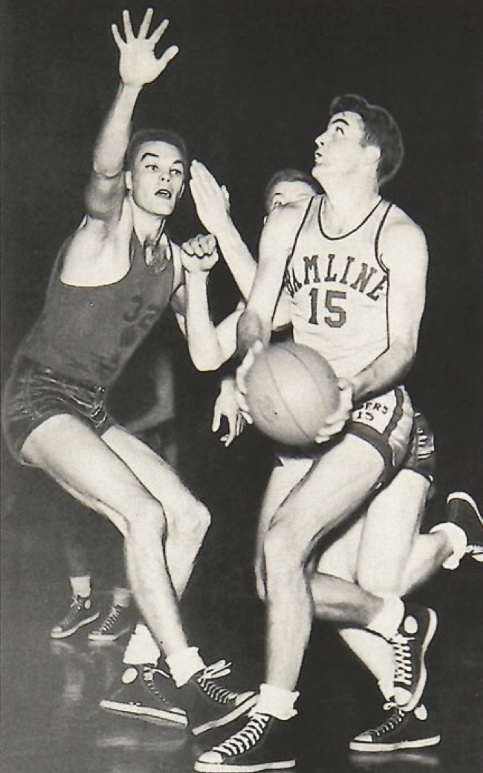
Hal Haskins, Hamline, 1949

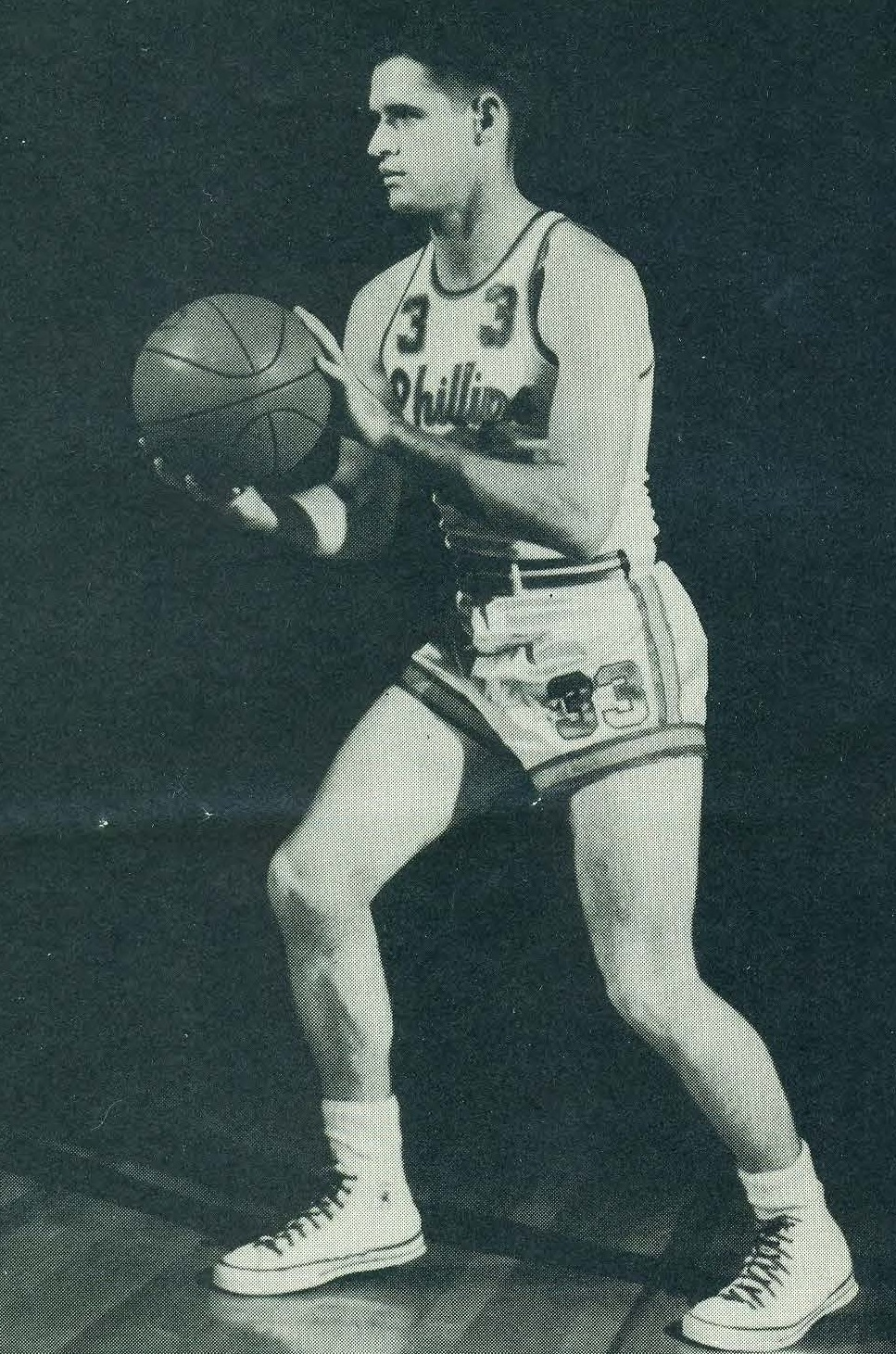
Scotty Steagall, Millikin, 1951

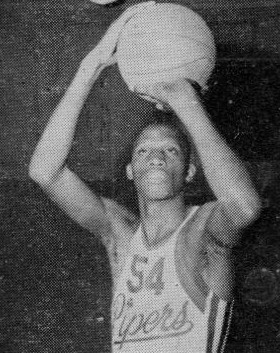
Dick Barnett, Tennessee State, 1958 & 1959

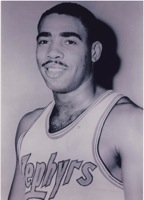
Charles Hardnett, Grambling State, 1961

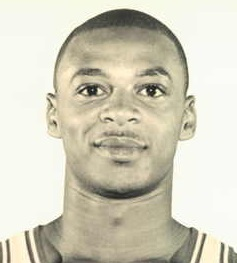
Zelmo Beaty, Prairie View A&M, 1962

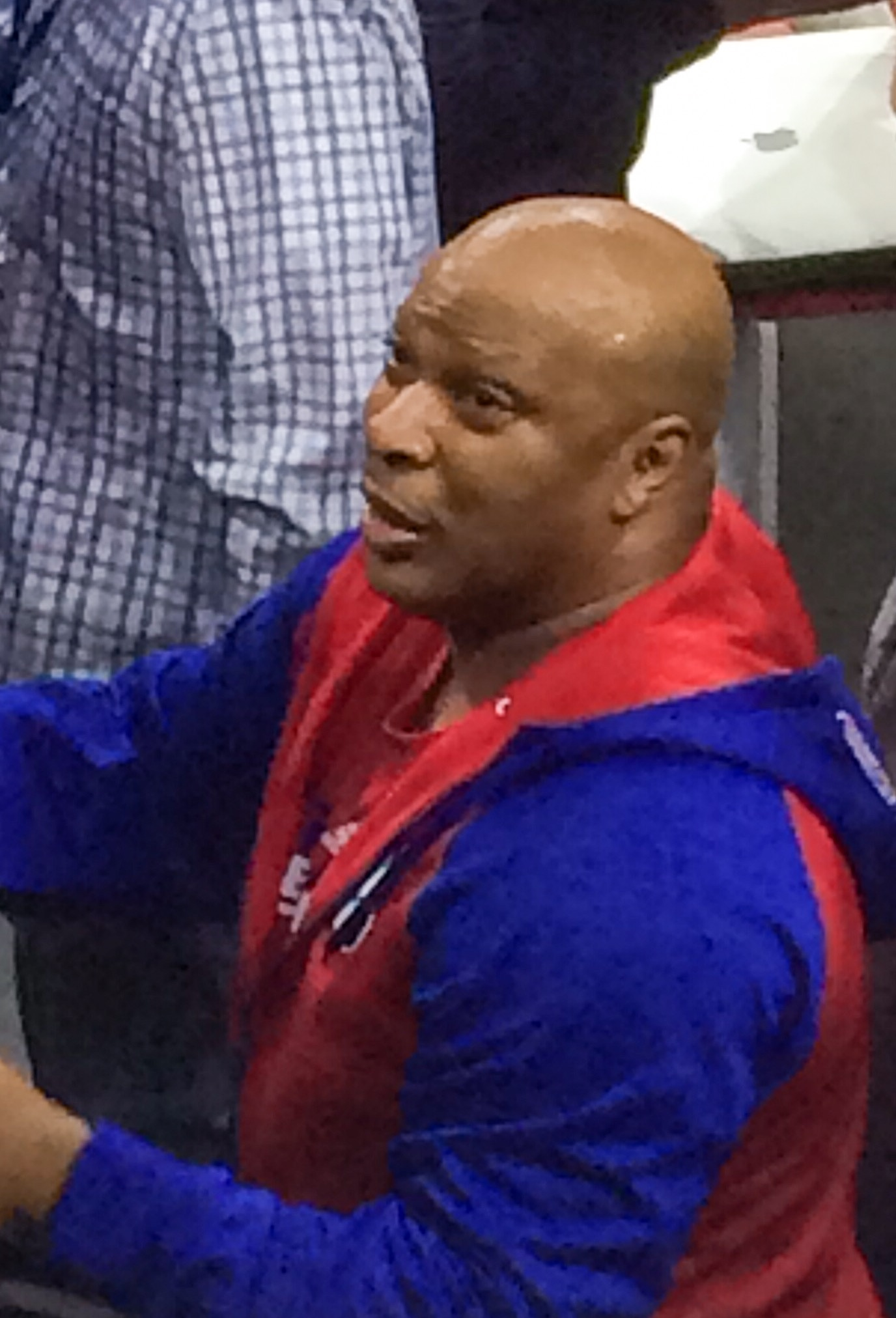
Lloyd Free, Guilford, 1973

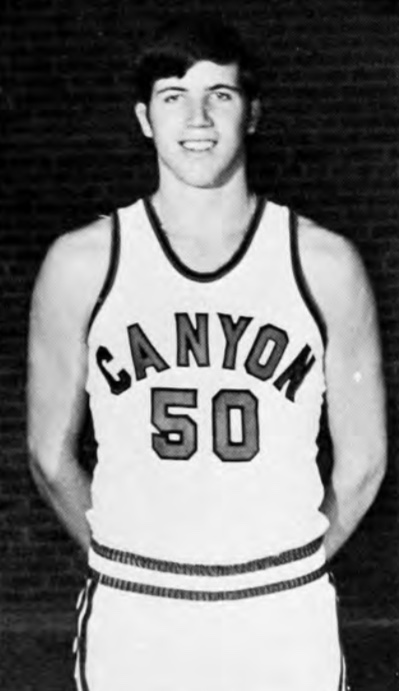
Bayard Forrest, Grand Canyon, 1975

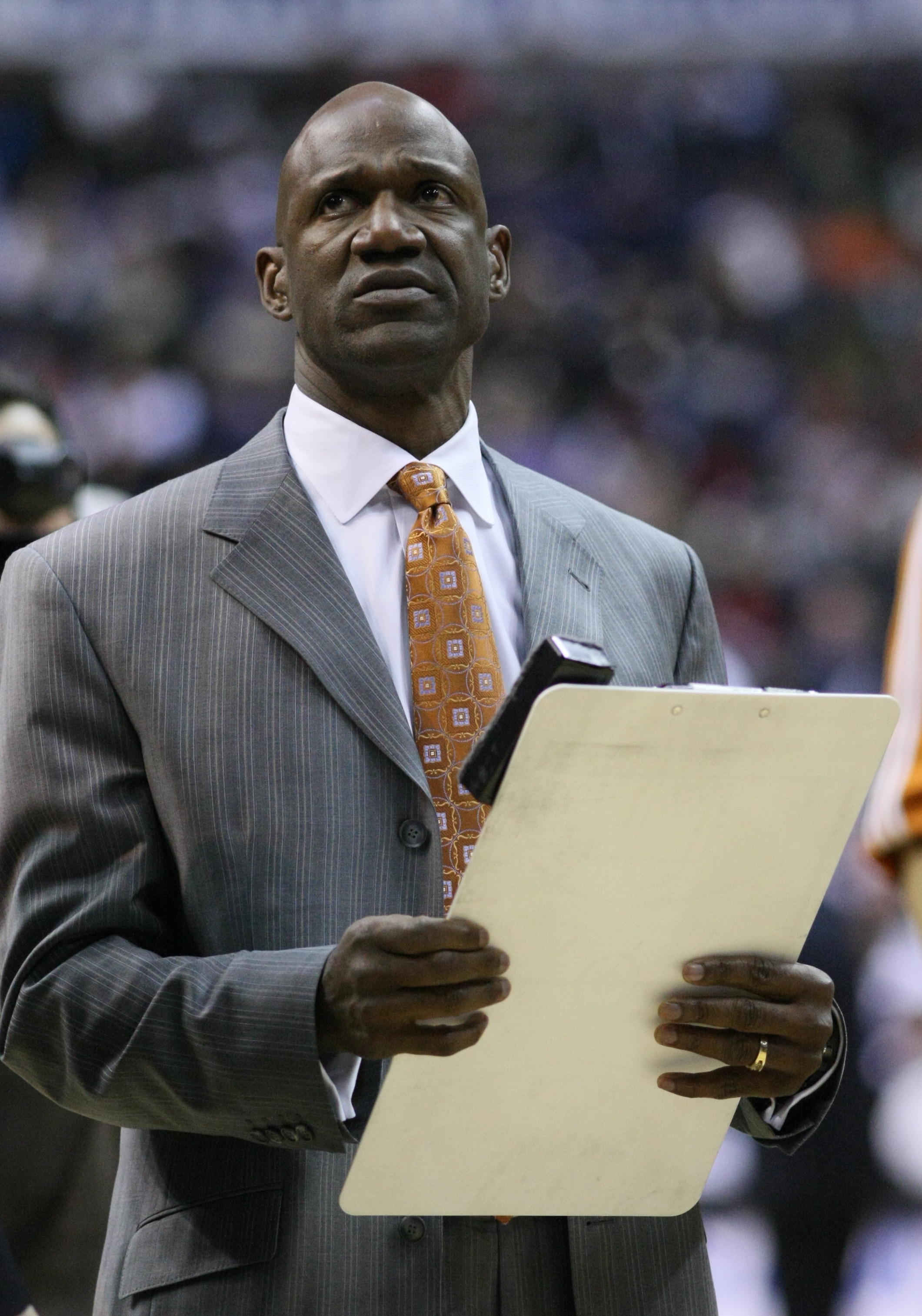
Terry Porter, Wisconsin–Stevens Point, 1984

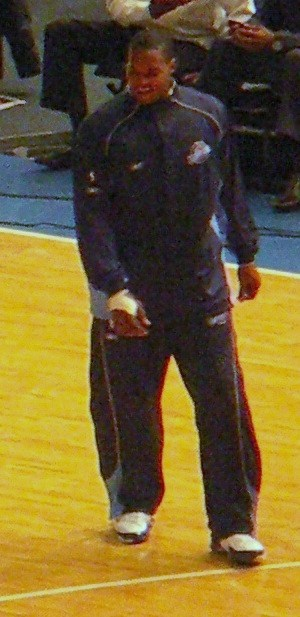
Robert Whaley, Walsh, 2005

=== Non-divisional era (1939–1991, 2021–present) ===
Year	Most Valuable Player	Team	Reference
1939	Edgar Hinshaw	Southwestern (KS)	
1940	Mel Waits	Tarkio (MO)	
1941	Charles Thomas	Northwestern State (LA)	
1942	Gus Doerner	Evansville (IN)	
1943	Belus Smawley	Appalachian State (NC)	
1944	Tournament canceled due to World War II		
1945	Fred Lewis	Eastern Kentucky	
1946	Gene Stotlar	Southern Illinois	
1947	Irvin Leifer	Eastern Washington	
1948	Duane Klueh	Indiana State	
1949	Hal Haskins	Hamline (MN)	
1950	Lenny Rzeszewski	Indiana State	
1951	Scotty Steagall	Millikin (IL)	
1952	Bennie Purcell	Murray State (KY)	
1953	Jerry Anderson	Missouri State	
1954	Jerry Anderson (2)	Missouri State	
1955	Jim Miller	Texas A&M–Commerce	
1956	Bill Reigel	McNeese (LA)	
1957	Jim Spivey	Southeastern Oklahoma State	
1958	Dick Barnett	Tennessee State	
1959	Dick Barnett (2)	Tennessee State	
1960	Charles Sharp	Texas State	
1961	Charles Hardnett	Grambling State (LA)	
1962	Zelmo Beaty	Prairie View A&M (TX)	
1963	Lucious Jackson	UT Rio Grande Valley (TX)	
1964	Lucious Jackson (2)	UT Rio Grande Valley (TX)	
1965	Ken Wilburn	Central State (OH)	
1966	Al Tucker	Oklahoma Baptist	
1967	Al Tucker (2)	Oklahoma Baptist	
1968	John Jamerson	Fairmont State (WV)	
1969	Jake Ford	Maryland Eastern Shore	
1970	Greg Hyder	Eastern New Mexico	
1971	Travis Grant	Kentucky State	
1972	Travis Grant (2)	Kentucky State	
1973	Lloyd Free	Guilford (NC)	
1974	Foots Walker	West Georgia	
1975	Bayard Forrest	Grand Canyon (AZ)	
1976	Joe Pace	Coppin State (MD)	
1977	Alonzo Bradley	Texas Southern	
1978	Tom Ritzdorf	Nebraska–Kearney	
1979	Lawrence Washington	Drury (MO)	
1980	LeRoy Jackson	Cameron (OK)	
1981	George Torres	Southern Nazarene (OK)	
1982	Mike Gibson	USC Upstate (SC)	
1983	Stephen Yetman	Charleston (SC)	
1984	Terry Porter	Wisconsin–Stevens Point	
1985	Edgar Eason	Fort Hays State (KS)	
1986	John Kimbrell	Lipscomb (TN)	
1987	Tom Meier	Washburn (KS)	
1988	Rodney Johns	Grand Canyon (AZ)	
1989	Vernell Kemp	East Central (OK)	
1990	Stacy Butler	Birmingham–Southern (AL)	
1991	Eric Manuel	Oklahoma City	
1992– 2020	Split into NAIA Divisions I and II		
2021	James Jones	Shawnee State (OH)	
2022	Myles Burns	Loyola (LA)	
2023	Charles Elzie	College of Idaho	
2024	Hunter Scurlock	Freed–Hardeman (TN)	
2025	Samaje Morgan	College of Idaho	
2026	Phil Horton	Freed–Hardeman (TN)	

=== Divisional era (1992–2020) ===
NAIA Division I
Year	Most Valuable Player	Team	Reference
1992	Smokey McCovery	Oklahoma City	
1993	Lemar Young	Hawaii Pacific	
1994	Kevin Franklin	Oklahoma City	
1995	James Cason	Birmingham–Southern (AL)	
1996	Reggie Garrett	Oklahoma City	
1997	James Harris	Life (GA)	
1998	Will Carlton	Georgetown (KY)	
1999	Corey Evans	Life (GA)	
2000	Jimmie Hunter	Life (GA)	
2001	Paul Little	Faulkner (AL)	
2002	Michael Williamson	USAO (OK)	
2003	Raynardo Curry	Mountain State (WV)	
2004	Zach Moss	Mountain State (WV)	
2005	Brandon Cole	John Brown (AR)	
2006	Evan Patterson	Texas Wesleyan	
2007	Kameron Gray	Oklahoma City	
2008	Kameron Gray (2)	Oklahoma City	
2009	Devin Uskoski	Rocky Mountain (MT)	
2010	Nate Brumfield	Oklahoma Baptist	
2011	Trevor Setty	Pikeville (KY)	
2012	Cameron Gliddon	Concordia (CA)	
2013	Monty Wilson	Georgetown (KY)	
2014	Preston Wynne	Vanguard (CA)	
2015	Jordan Bowling	Dalton State (GA)	
2016	Devonse Reed	Mid-America Christian (OK)	
2017	Dion Rogers	Texas Wesleyan	
2018	LT Davis	Graceland (MO)	
2019	Chris Coffey	Georgetown (KY)	
2020	Tournament canceled due to the coronavirus pandemic		

NAIA Division II
Year	Most Valuable Player	Team	Reference
1992	David James	Grace (IN)	
1993	Mike Ward	Willamette (OR)	
1994	Chris Peterson	Eureka (IL)	
1995	Mark Galloway	Bethel (IN)	
1996	Damon Archibald	College of Idaho	
1997	Rico Swanson	Bethel (IN)	
1998	Rico Swanson (2)	Bethel (IN)	
1999	Mike Long	Cornerstone (MI)	
2000	Jason Cruse	Embry–Riddle (FL)	
2001	Brandon Woudstra	Northwestern (IA)	
2002	Daniel Cutbirth	Evangel (MO)	
2003	Brandon Woudstra (2)	Northwestern (IA)	
2004	Kevin Baker	Oregon Tech	
2005	Robert Whaley	Walsh (OH)	
2006	Michael Bonaparte	College of the Ozarks (MO)	
2007	Adam Hepker	MidAmerica Nazarene (KS)	
2008	Ryan Fiegi	Oregon Tech	
2009	Steve Briggs	Oklahoma Wesleyan	
2010	DeJovaun Sawyer-Davis	Saint Francis (IN)	
2011	Caleb Simons	Cornerstone (MI)	
2012	Bobby Hunter	Oregon Tech	
2013	Darren Moore	Cardinal Stritch (WI)	
2014	Jordan Weidner	Indiana Wesleyan	
2015	Kyle Steigenga	Cornerstone (MI)	
2016	Jonny Marlin	Indiana Wesleyan	
2017	Paul Stone	Union (KY)	
2018	Kyle Mangas	Indiana Wesleyan	
2019	Paul Marandet	Spring Arbor (MI)	
2020	Tournament canceled due to the coronavirus pandemic		

== See also ==
- NCAA Division I basketball tournament Most Outstanding Player – the equivalent award in NCAA Division I men's and women's tournaments
