= 1951 NAIA basketball tournament =

College basketball tournament

1951 NAIA men's basketball tournament
- Season: 1950–51
- Teams: 32
- Finals site: Municipal Auditorium; Kansas City, Missouri
- Champions: Hamline (3rd title, 3rd title game, 5th Final Four)
- Runner-up: Millikin (1st title game, 1st Final Four)
- Semifinalists: Baldwin-Wallace (1st Final Four); Regis (2nd Final Four)
- MVP: Scotty Steagall (Millikin (Ill.))

The 1951 NAIA basketball tournament was held in March at Municipal Auditorium in Kansas City, Missouri. The 14th Annual NAIA basketball tournament featured 32 teams playing in a single-elimination format.

The championship game featured Hamline and Millikin. It was the first meeting between these two schools in tournament history. The Pipers of Hamline defeated the Big Blue of Millikin, 69–61.

The 1951 Tournament would be Hamline's 5th trip to the NAIA Final Four, and second tournament win, it was also Millikin's only trip to championship game, NAIA Final Four, and first of eventually four tournament berths. The other teams that rounded out the semifinals were Baldwin-Wallace and Regis. The Baldwin-Wallace Yellow Jackets defeated the Regis Rangers, 82–78.

Hamline's win put them on the leader board for most tournament champions with 3. A record that would last until Tennessee State would win in consecutive years. (1957, 1958, 1959.) Three Championships would be a tournament record until 1996 when Oklahoma City won its 4th Championship Title.

== Awards and honors ==
Many of the records set by the 1951 tournament have been broken, and many of the awards were established much later:

- Leading Scorer Award est. 1963
- Leading Rebounder Award est. 1963
- Charles Stevenson Hustle Award est. 1958
- Coach of the Year est. 1954
- Player of the Year est. 1994
- All-time scoring leaders; second appearance: Lloyd Thorgaard, 10th, Hamline (Minn.) (1950,51,52,53), 15 games, 111 field goals, 61 free throws, 283 total points, 18.9 average per game; James Fritsche, 14th, Hamline (Minn.) (1950,51,52,53), 15 games, 113 field goals, 46 free throws, 272 total points, 18.1 average per game.

== Bracket ==
First round	Second round
Evansville	85
Westminster (PA)	74
Evansville	75
Morningside	62
Morningside	66
Providence (RI)	63
TOP TIER
Regis	72
East Central State (OK)	55
Regis	82
Southwest Texas State	64
Southwest Texas State	70
Morehead State	62
Millikin	77
Eastern New Mexico	63
Millikin	80
East Texas Baptist	62
East Texas Baptist	67
High Point	64
TOP TIER
Pepperdine	86
Eau Claire State	53
Pepperdine	59
Florida State	61
Florida State	85
South Dakota State	70
Hamline	82
Rocky Mountain	57
Hamline	64
Arkansas Tech	52
Arkansas Tech	64
Pacific (CA)	61
BOTTOM TIER
Central (MO)	68
Southeastern Louisiana	66
Central	69
New Mexico A&M	73
New Mexico A&M	68
Glenville State	54
Baldwin-Wallace	67
American	66
Baldwin-Wallace	68
Ottawa	67
Ottawa (KS)	73
Hillsdale	58
BOTTOM TIER
Memphis State	76
Portland	74
Memphis State	81
Hastings	79*
Hastings	71
Pacific Lutheran	51

Elite Eight
Evansville	68
Regis	70
Millikin	91
Florida State	60
Hamline	80
New Mexico A&M	56
Baldwin-Wallace	90
Memphis State	67

NAIA national semifinals
Regis	70
Millikin	88
Hamline	78
Baldwin-Wallace	62

NAIA national championship
Millikin	61
Hamline	69
NAIA third-place game
Baldwin-Wallace	82
Regis	78

- * denotes overtime.

== See also ==
- 1951 NCAA basketball tournament
- 1951 National Invitation Tournament
