= John Barnhill (basketball) =

American basketball player

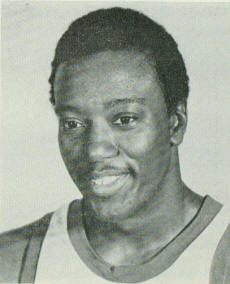
- Barnhill, c. 1970

Personal information
- Born: March 20, 1938 Sturgis, Kentucky, U.S.
- Died: November 11, 2013 (aged 75)
- Listed height: 6 ft 1 in (1.85 m)
- Listed weight: 180 lb (82 kg)

Career information
- High school: Lincoln (Evansville, Indiana)
- College: Tennessee State (1955–1959)
- NBA draft: 1959: 11th round, 77th overall pick
- Drafted by: St. Louis Hawks
- Playing career: 1960–1972
- Position: Point guard / shooting guard
- Number: 20, 21, 35, 30, 11, 12, 23, 15
- Coaching career: 1972–1975

Career history

Playing
- 1960–1962: Cleveland Pipers
- 1962–1965: St. Louis Hawks
- 1965–1966: Detroit Pistons
- 1966–1967: Baltimore Bullets
- 1967–1968: San Diego Rockets
- 1968–1969: Scranton Miners
- 1969: Baltimore Bullets
- 1969–1971: Indiana Pacers
- 1971: Denver Rockets
- 1971–1972: Indiana Pacers

Coaching
- 1972–1975: Los Angeles Lakers (assistant)

Career highlights
- 2x ABA champion (1970, 1972); ABL champion (1962); 3× NAIA champion (1957–1959)

Career NBA and ABA statistics
- Points: 5,085 (8.6 ppg)
- Rebounds: 1,501 (2.5 rpg)
- Assists: 1,693 (2.9 apg)
- Stats at NBA.com
- Stats at Basketball Reference

John Anthony "Rabbit" Barnhill (March 20, 1938 – November 11, 2013) was an American professional basketball player. He played for the St. Louis Hawks, Detroit Pistons, Baltimore Bullets and San Diego Rockets in the National Basketball Association (NBA); and the Indianapolis Pacers and Denver Rockets in the American Basketball Association (ABA). Barnhill attended Tennessee A & I State College (now Tennessee State University) where he was the starting point guard on three consecutive NAIA national men's basketball championship teams from 1956 to 1959, playing under Naismith Basketball Hall of Fame coach John McClendon. These three teams were collectively inducted into the Naismith Basketball Hall of Fame in 2019. He was named to the first or second all-tournament teams in each of those seasons.

After graduating college, he played for the Cleveland Pipers, winning championships in the National Industrial Basketball League and the American Basketball League. Barnhill was a member of the Pipers team that defeated the 1960 United States men's Olympic basketball team, scoring 21 points in the only defeat that team ever suffered. He was also selected to play on an Amateur Athletic Union (AAU) team that played eight exhibition games in the Soviet Union in 1961. As a professional player, Barnhill played for the 1970 ABA champion Indiana Pacers, and was a member of the Pacers championship team during the 1972 regular season.

== Early life ==
Barnhill was born on March 20, 1938, in Sturgis, Kentucky. He was raised in Evansville, Indiana, and attended Lincoln High School, an all-Black school in Evansville where he was president of his senior class. Lincoln was closed in 1962. Barnhill played on Lincoln's basketball team from 1952 to 1955, and was team captain all three seasons. As a junior, he was a 5 ft 10 in (1.78 m) forward on the 1953–54 team, and a 5 ft 11 in (1.8 m) forward on the 1954–55 team as a senior. Barnhill led the team in scoring during the 1953–54 season. He averaged 19.5 points per game as a senior. In his senior year, Lincoln was undefeated during the regular season, winning the city championship; but later lost its first game of the year in sectional competition, ending a 20–0 winning streak. Lincoln was the first Evansville team to go undefeated in the regular season.

In 1964, Evansville's Sunday Courier and Press named Barnhill first-team All-Evansville among all high school basketball players over the previous decade.

== College career ==
Barnhill attended Tennessee State University (then known as Tennessee Agricultural & Industrial State College), in Nashville, where he received a Bachelor of Science in physical education. Barnhill played basketball for the Tennessee State Tigers under future Naismith Basketball Hall of Fame head coach John McClendon, who had learned basketball directly from James Naismith. After hearing about Barnhill from Lincoln High School's principal, who worked at Tennessee State in the summers, McClendon went to Evansville to recruit Barnhill; and Barnhill's mother trusted that McClendon would look after her son.

Barnhill was a playmaking point guard on Tennessee State's teams from 1956 to 1959. He played on the 1956–57 Tigers team had a 31–4 record (though also reported contemporaneously as 25–4 record). The Tigers won the National Association of Intercollegiate Athletics (NAIA) championship in 1957, defeating Southeastern Oklahoma 92–73 in the championship game. Tennessee State was the first historically black college and university (HBCU) to win a major national college basketball championship. Barnhill was a starting guard on the team, and was named to the second-team All-Tournament Team by the NAIA. His teammates included, among others, future Naismith Basketball Hall of Fame guard Dick Barnett, who was named to the first-team All-NAIA Tournament Team that season.

The Tigers won the NAIA championships again in the 1957–58 and 1958–59 seasons. This was the first time any college team had won three consecutive national basketball titles. The Tigers had a 31–3 record in 1957–58, and a 32–1 record in 1958–59. In 2019, the three Tennessee State championship teams were collectively inducted into the Naismith Basketball Hall of Fame. In 2014, all three of these Tennessee State teams were collectively inducted into the Tennessee Sports Hall of Fame. Barnhill and Dick Barnett were later selected among the 25 players on the NAIA's 50th anniversary all-star team, along with players such as Naismith Hall of Fame members Earl Monroe, Willis Reed and Zelmo Beatty. McClendon was also named to the 50th anniversary team as a coach. Barnhill and Barnett were among the 60 players selected to the NAIA's 75th anniversary all-star team.

In the 1958 championship win over Western Illinois, 85–73, all five Tennessee State starters played the entire game. Barnhill was named second-team All-NAIA Tournament Team for the second consecutive year. Barnett was named the tournament's Most Valuable Player (MVP). Barnhill was team captain in 1958–59, and considered the team's "floor general" on the court. Fellow Lincoln High graduate and future NBA player Porter Meriwether joined the Tigers that season. Tennessee State defeated Pacific Lutheran, 97–87, for their third NAIA title. Barnhill was named to the first-team All-NAIA Tournament Team, along with Barnett (who was the MVP for a second consecutive year). Barnhill was a second-team NAIA All-American in 1959.

Barnhill finished his college career with 1,253 points. He was Tennessee State's second leading all-time scorer when he graduated, behind only Dick Barnett. As of 2020, he ranked 19th in school history (with Barnett still first with 3,209 points). Barnhill was a three-time NAIA All-American (1957, 1958 and 1959), and helped the Tigers to a three-year record of 94–8 (.922).

== Professional and amateur career ==
=== Cleveland Pipers ===
The St. Louis Hawks selected Barnhill in the 11th round of the 1959 NBA draft, 79th overall. Rather than playing with the Hawks, Barnhill joined the Cleveland Pipers of the National Industrial Basketball League, in 1959. The NIBL was considered an amateur league. John McClendon had left Tennessee State and taken the Pipers' head coaching job, and Barnhill became a starting guard. McClendon has been called the first African American coach of a professional sports team, although the Pipers did not join a professional league (the American Basketball League) until 1961. The team was purchased in 1960 by George Steinbrenner (future owner of the New York Yankees).

In the 1960–61 season, the Pipers were the NIBL champions and the National AAU (Amateur Athletic Union) champions. More significantly, before the NIBL season began, under McClendon's guidance the Pipers defeated the 1960 United States men's Olympic basketball team in an exhibition game, 101–96; the only defeat that team ever suffered. Barnhill had 21 points against the Olympic team, that included, among others, future NBA Hall of Fame players Walt Bellamy, Jerry Lucas, Oscar Robertson, and Jerry West.

The Pipers joined the American Basketball League (ABL) for the 1961–62 season. The ABL was organized by Abe Saperstein, owner of the Harlem Globetrotters. Barnhill's Piper teammates included Dick Barnett and future NBA guard Larry Siegfried. The Pipers were ABL champions, but the league folded by the end of 1962. McClendon had left the team in January 1962 after a public dispute with Steinbrenner, and Hall of Fame guard and coach Bill Sharman took over as the Piper's head coach in leading the team to the championship in the ABL's sole season.

In early 1961, after Barnhill's second year in Cleveland, the AAU and United States Department of State organized a team of American players for a series of eight exhibition games in the Soviet Union, starting in April. The team was coached by John McClendon and was headed by Ohio State All-American Jerry Lucas as its most prominent player. The team included five Pipers: Barnhill, Ben Warley, Roger Taylor, Jack Adams, and Dan Swartz. Other American players included future NBA All-Star Tom Meschery, Mike Moran, Les Lane, Jerry Shipp, Gary Thompson, and Jim Francis.

=== National Basketball Association ===
==== St. Louis Hawks ====
In the Summer of 1962, Barnhill signed to play with the St. Louis Hawks in the NBA. Barnhill played in 77 games for the Hawks as a rookie (1962–63). He was the starting shooting guard in a backcourt with future Hall of Fame point guard Lenny Wilkens. Barnhill averaged career-highs of 35 minutes, 11.7 points, 4.2 assists and 4.7 rebounds per game. He was 11th in NBA Most Valuable Player voting that season. Barnhill became a reserve guard the following season, with the addition of future Hall of Fame guard Richie Guerin to the Hawks early in the 1963–64 season. Barnhill averaged 6.6 points, 2.0 assists, and 2.1 rebounds in 18.5 minutes per game that season. Barnhill played in only 41 games during the 1964–65 season, averaging 19 minutes, seven points, 1.9 assists and 2.2 rebounds per game. Barnhill had suffered a pulled muscle during the season. He had played in 31 games for the Hawks during the 1965–66 season (averaging 22.3 minutes per game), when he was traded in late December to the Detroit Pistons for Joe Caldwell (who had been the Pistons 1964 first round draft choice).

==== Detroit Pistons, Baltimore Bullets, San Diego Rockets ====
Pistons player-coach Dave DeBusschere believed Barnhill would bring speed, playmaking skills, and good defense to the Pistons. Barnhill played point guard, averaging 20.6 minutes, 7.5 points, 2.5 assists, and 2.5 rebounds per game. The Pistons left him exposed in the 1966 expansion draft and he was selected by the Chicago Bulls, who released Barnhill before the start of the 1966 season. He was then signed by the Baltimore Bullets in mid-October when his former Tennessee State and Pipers' teammate Ben Warley (now with the Bullets) was injured. He played in 53 games for the Bullets, averaging 22.9 minutes, 8.3 points, 2.6 assists, and three rebounds per game.

The Bullets left him exposed in the 1967 expansion draft, and Barnhill was selected by the San Diego Rockets. He played in 75 games for the Rockets during the 1967–68 season, averaging 25.1 minutes per game at point guard; the most for any point guard on the team. He averaged 9.9 points, 3.5 assists and 2.3 rebounds per game. After the season, for the third year in a row he was left exposed in the expansion draft, and was selected by the Phoenix Suns. Of the at least five players taken in three expansion drafts, Barnhill, George Wilson (1967, 1968, 1970), Len Chappell (1966, 1968, 1970), Don Kojis (1961, 1966, 1967), and McCoy McLemore (1966, 1968, 1970), Barnhill is arguably the only player ever taken in three consecutive expansion drafts.

Barnhill informed the Suns he did not want to play for them, and Phoenix waived him in August 1968. He then played in the Eastern League with the Scranton Miners. The Bullets purchased his contract in late January 1969, when they found themselves in need of a reserve guard for Earl Monroe and Kevin Loughery. Barnhill played in 30 games with the Bullets, averaging 16.8 minutes, 6.4 points, 2.4 assists, and 1.8 rebounds per game. These were the last games of his NBA career. The Bullets waived him in October 1969.

In his seven-year NBA career, Barnhill averaged 23.6 minutes per game, 8.6 points per game, 2.8 rebounds per game, and 2.8 assists per game.

=== American Basketball Association ===
Barnhill signed with the Indiana Pacers of the American Basketball Association a few days later. During the 1969–70 season, Barnhill was the Pacers’ shooting guard in the starting back court with point guard Freddie Lewis during much of the regular season, playing as a reserve during the playoffs. Barnhill suffered from leg problems and missed some playing time and starts that season. He still played nearly 31 minutes per game in 77 games, averaging 11.4 points, 4.1 assists and 2.2 rebounds per game. The Pacers defeated the Los Angeles Stars in a six-game finals series to become ABA champions in 1970. Although he only played 12 minutes as a reserve in the opening game of that series against the Stars, Barnhill's defense was an important factor in the Pacers' victory. Overall, in 14 playoff games in 1970, he averaged 22.6 minutes, 6.1 points, 1.8 assists and 2.4 rebounds per game.

Barnhill began the 1970–71 season with the Pacers. He was traded to the Denver Rockets, along with Art Becker, a draft pick and cash for Don Sidle and Wayne Champman. In 43 games with the Pacers, Barnhill averaged 14.4 minutes and five points per game. In 24 games with the Rockets, Barnhill averaged 28.5 minutes, 11.4 points, 3.2 assists and 2.3 rebounds per game.

The Rockets waived him in late September 1971, and Barnhill returned to the Pacers during the 1971–72 season, playing in 19 games, while averaging a little over 10 minutes per game. On March 29, 1972, Barnhill, accompanied by his wife Janet and their three young children, announced his retirement before the start of the Pacers' game against the Pittsburgh Condors at the Indiana State Fair Coliseum. The Pacers won the ABA championship again in 1972, and while Barnhill did not play, he joined the team in post-game celebrations. At the time he retired, Barnhill held the Pacers' record for most three-point shots made in a game (6).

== Coaching career ==
In August 1972, the Los Angeles Lakers hired the 34-year old Barnhill to serve as an assistant coach to head coach Bill Sharman (who had been Barnhill's coach with the Cleveland Pipers). Barnhill was also hired to serve as director of player personnel. Barnhill succeeded K. C. Jones, who had left to become a head coach in the ABA. In 1973, Sharman made Barnhill head coach for three games while Sharman scouted the National Invitation Tournament. Barnhill acted as the Lakers' interim head coach during the 1974–75 season, while Sharman's wife was ill with cancer.

Barnhill resigned from the Lakers as an assistant coach in May 1975. He was rehired in January 1976, and reportedly served as an assistant coach for the Lakers in 1976 (Barnhill stating in October 1977 that he had been a Lakers' assistant the previous four seasons). It also has been reported, however, that he only coached with the Lakers from 1972 to 1975. On the other end, it also has been stated that Barnhill left the Lakers as an assistant coach as late as 1978, hoping to become a head coach, but never became a head coach (believing most teams were not willing to have Black head coaches in that era).

== Legacy and honors ==
Barnhill has received the following honors and been a part of the following accomplishments, among others;

- Member of Tennessee State University Tiger teams (1956 to 1959) inducted into Naismith Basketball Hall of Fame (2019)
- Inducted into Indiana Basketball Hall of Fame (2026)
- Inducted into NAIA Hall of Fame (1964)
- Inaugural class Tennessee State University Sports Hall of Fame (1983)
- Inducted into Tennessee Sports Hall of Fame (2014)
- 50th Anniversary NAIA All-Star Team (1986)
- 75th Anniversary NAIA All-Star Team (2012)
- NAIA second-team All-America (1959)
- Member of only team to defeat 1960 United States men's Olympic basketball team (1960)

He was nicknamed “Rabbit” because of his speed.

== Personal life and death ==
Barnhill served in the United States Army Reserve. In 1973, he opened a sporting goods store. He earned a Master of Science degree in special education at California State University, Northridge and worked for the Los Angeles Unified School District from 1976 to 2001 as a special education teacher at Bret Harte Middle School. He was an Elder in the Seventh-day Adventist Church in Rolling Hills, California. Barnhill resided in Rancho Palos Verdes, California from 1972 until his death on November 10, 2013, from mitochondrial myoapathy.

== Career statistics ==
Legend
GP	Games played	GS	Games started	MPG	Minutes per game
FG%	Field goal percentage	3P%	3-point field goal percentage	FT%	Free throw percentage
RPG	Rebounds per game	APG	Assists per game	SPG	Steals per game
BPG	Blocks per game	PPG	Points per game	**Bold**	Career high

†	Denotes seasons in which Barnhill's team won an ABA championship

=== NBA/ABA ===
==== Regular season ====
Year	Team	GP	MPG	FG%	3P%	FT%	RPG	APG	PPG
1962–63	St. Louis	**77**	**35.0**	.430		.710	**4.7**	**4.2**	**11.7**
1963–64	St. Louis	74	18.5	.412		.609	2.1	2.0	6.6
1964–65	St. Louis	41	19.0	.388		.643	2.2	1.9	7.0
1965–66	St. Louis	31	22.3	.428		.628	2.9	2.7	8.5
1965–66	Detroit	45	20.6	.383		.602	2.5	2.5	7.5
1966–67	Baltimore	53	22.9	.418		.641	3.0	2.6	8.3
1967–68	San Diego	75	25.1	.421		.658	2.3	3.5	9.9
1968–69	Baltimore	30	16.8	**.434**		.600	1.8	2.4	6.4
1969–70†	Indiana (ABA)	**77**	30.8	.394	**.261**	.664	2.2	4.1	11.4
1970–71	Indiana (ABA)	43	14.4	.332	.187	.689	1.4	1.9	5.0
1970–71	Denver (ABA)	24	28.5	.396	.250	**.740**	2.3	3.2	11.4
1971–72†	Indiana (ABA)	19	10.2	.322	.114	.533	**1.0**	.8	**3.6**
Career (NBA)		426	23.6	.416		.651	2.8	2.8	8.6
Career (ABA)		163	23.7	.380	.236	.677	1.9	3.0	8.8
Career (overall)		589	23.6	.406	.236	.658	2.5	2.9	8.6

==== Playoffs ====
Year	Team	GP	MPG	FG%	3P%	FT%	RPG	APG	PPG
1963	St. Louis	11	**28.5**	.403		**.682**	**2.5**	**3.3**	**7.0**
1964	St. Louis	5	12.2	**.522**		.400	1.0	1.0	5.2
1965	St. Louis	4	9.0	.182		.500	1.8	.5	1.5
1969	Baltimore	1	10.0	.500		–	2.0	1.0	2.0
1970†	Indiana (ABA)	**14**	22.6	.318	.229	.512	2.4	1.8	6.1
Career (NBA)		21	20.0	.407		.613	2.0	2.1	5.3
Career (overall)		35	21.1	.368	.229	.556	2.1	2.0	5.6
