= John McLendon =

American basketball coach

Biographical details
- Born: April 5, 1915; Hiawatha, Kansas, U.S.
- Died: October 8, 1999 (aged 84); Cleveland Heights, Ohio, U.S.

Coaching career (HC unless noted)
- 1941–1952: North Carolina College
- 1953–1954: Hampton
- 1955–1959: Tennessee A&I
- 1959–1962: Cleveland Pipers
- 1964–1966: Kentucky State
- 1966–1969: Cleveland State
- 1969: Denver Rockets

Accomplishments and honors

Championships
- 3× NAIA Champion (1957–1959); 8× CIAA (1941, 1943–44, 1946–47, 1949–50, 1952); 2× CIAA conference (1946, 1950)

Awards
- Theodore Roosevelt Award (2021)
- Basketball Hall of Fame; Inducted in 1979, 2016
- College Basketball Hall of Fame; Inducted in 2006

John B. McLendon Jr. (April 5, 1915 – October 8, 1999) was an American basketball coach who is recognized as the first African American basketball coach at a predominantly white university and the first African American head coach in any professional sport. He was a major contributor to the development of modern basketball and coached on both the college and professional levels during his career. He has been enshrined three times in the Naismith Memorial Basketball Hall of Fame, and also inducted into the National Collegiate Basketball Hall of Fame.

== Early life ==
McClendon was born in Hiawatha, Kansas. McLendon Jr. was part African American and part Delaware Indian from his mother's side. His mother died in the 1918 flu pandemic which would lead to the temporary break-up of his family. McClendon and his younger brother were sent to be with his Delaware Indian grandparents on a ranch near Trinidad, Colorado while his older sister was sent to be with an aunt in Omaha, Nebraska, and his younger sister was sent to be with other relatives, but would end up with a foster family on a ranch in Idaho. McClendon would not see his younger sister again for 45 years, but the rest of the family were reunited after his father remarried in 1921.

The family settled in Kansas City, Kansas, where McClendon would first go to Dunbar Elementary School and later Sumner High School. He became enamored with the sport of basketball while on a field trip from Dunbar Elementary to the new Northeast Junior High School in Kansas City, Kansas, where he saw his first official basketball court. He soon became an all-around athlete at Sumner High School and chose basketball as his favorite sport, although he failed to make the basketball team at Sumner. Instead, he lettered in gymnastics and was the basketball team manager.

== College ==
After high school, McClendon first attended Kansas City Kansas Junior College where he finally made the basketball team. The team went undefeated, although he only played sparingly. After one year at Kansas City Kansas Junior College he then transferred to the University of Kansas, where he learned the intricacies of basketball from the sport's inventor, James Naismith, who was the athletic director at the school. However, McLendon was not permitted to actually play college basketball, as the KU varsity team was segregated and would not suit up its first black player until 1951. He graduated with a master's degree in physical education from the University of Iowa in 1937.

== Career ==
He went on to become a successful high school and college coach, at schools such as North Carolina College for Negroes (now North Carolina Central University), Hampton Institute (now University), Tennessee A&I (now Tennessee State University), Kentucky State College (now University) and Cleveland State University. In his early years, his teams were restricted to playing only against other all-black teams. However, while coaching at North Carolina College for Negroes, McLendon participated in "The Secret Game", a match against a team from Duke University, which was the first collegiate basketball contest where blacks and whites competed on the same floor. He led the Eagles to eight CIAA Championships (1941, 1943–44, 1946–47, 1949–50, 1952). McLendon's teams were credited with increasing the pace of the game of basketball from the slow tempo of its early years to the faster tempo that prevails today. At Cleveland State, he was the first African American head coach of a predominantly white university.

He was a three-time winner of the NAIA Coach of the Year award and won three consecutive NAIA championships at Tennessee State, making him the first college basketball coach ever to have won three consecutive national titles.

McLendon also coached professionally on two occasions. Cleveland Pipers General Manager Mike Cleary hired him in 1962 to be the head coach of the American Basketball League team which was owned by George Steinbrenner. McLendon's hiring made history, as he became the first African American head coach in professional sports. In his, and the Pipers', only season in the ABL, partway through the season he quit or was fired (sources differ). McLendon was replaced as coach by Bill Sharman of the recently defunct Los Angeles Jets of the ABL; under Sharman, the team completed the season and won the league championship. McLendon went on to coach the American Basketball Association's Denver Rockets (which later became the Denver Nuggets of the NBA) in 1969, although he was fired after the team started the season 9–19. Despite the fact that he was only 54 when dismissed, this was the last college or professional head coaching job in his career.

McLendon's contributions to the game of basketball include the invention of the fast break, full-court press and four corners offense.

== Recognition ==
McLendon was inducted into the Naismith Memorial Basketball Hall of Fame in 1979 as a contributor. He was, however, selected in 2007 for the second entering class of the National Collegiate Basketball Hall of Fame for his coaching achievements. He was also inducted into the Cleveland State Athletics Hall of Fame in 2007, where his wife Joanna accepted the award on his behalf.

On April 4, 2016, McLendon was announced as an inductee of the Naismith Hall again, this time as a coach. He was formally inducted in this role on September 9 of that year.

A biography of John B. McLendon, Breaking Through: John B. McLendon, Basketball Legend and Civil Rights Pioneer, by Milton S. Katz, was published in 2007. McLendon's coaching legacy is also chronicled in the documentary Black Magic, which originally aired as a two-part series on ESPN in March 2008.

The National Association of Collegiate Directors of Athletics sponsors the John McLendon Minority Scholarship Foundation, which offers postgraduate scholarships to minority students studying athletics administration. The foundation was formed under the directorship of Mike Cleary, who hired McLendon as head coach of the Cleveland Pipers in 1962 as the first African American head coach in professional sports.

Beginning in 2016, a first-round game in the CollegeInsider.com Postseason Tournament involving an HBCU team would be known as the Coach John Mclendon Classic. The tradition continued through the tournament's end in 2019. Eracism then took ownership of the event and relaunched it in 2021. It has been held annually ever since.

He was the 2021 recipient of the NCAA Theodore Roosevelt Award.

=== John McLendon Classic ===
Beginning in 2023, an annual College Basketball game will be hosted by Kansas to support the John McClendon Initiative. In the first edition, the Jayhawks will host North Carolina Central.

== Head coaching record ==
Legend
Regular season	G	Games coached	W	Games won	L	Games lost	W–L %	Win–loss %
Playoffs	PG	Playoff games	PW	Playoff wins	PL	Playoff losses	PW–L %	Playoff win–loss %

=== College ===
Record table
Season	Team	Overall	Conference	Standing	Postseason
North Carolina College (Central Intercollegiate Athletic Association) (1940–1952)
1940–41	North Carolina College	19–5	CIAA		
1941–42	North Carolina College	18–5	CIAA		
1942–43	North Carolina College	13–6	CIAA		
1943–44	North Carolina College	19–1	CIAA		
1944–45	North Carolina College	18–2	CIAA		
1945–46	North Carolina College	19–5	CIAA		
1946–47	North Carolina College	20–5	CIAA		
1947–48	North Carolina College	18–12	CIAA		
1948–49	North Carolina College	25–5	CIAA		
1949–50	North Carolina College	24–5	CIAA		
1950–51	North Carolina College	28–7	CIAA		
1951–52	North Carolina College	18–10	CIAA		
North Carolina College:		239–68 (.779)			
Hampton Pirates (Central Intercollegiate Athletic Association) (1952–1954)
1952–53	Hampton	16–6	CIAA		
1953–54	Hampton	16–13	CIAA		
Hampton Pirates:		32–19 (.627)			
Tennessee A&I Tigers (Midwestern) (1954–1959)
1954–55	Tennessee A&I	29–4	Midwestern		
1955–56	Tennessee A&I	26–8	Midwestern		NAIA Elite Eight
1956–57	Tennessee A&I	31–4	Midwestern		NAIA National Champion
1957–58	Tennessee A&I	31–3	Midwestern		NAIA National Champion
1958–59	Tennessee A&I	32–1	Midwestern		NAIA National Champion
Tennessee A&I:		149–20 (.882)			
Cleveland State Vikings (Independent) (1966–1969)
1966–67	Cleveland State	8–13			
1967–68	Cleveland State	7–15			
1968–69	Cleveland State	12–14			
Cleveland State:		27–42 (.391)			
Total:		496–179 (.735)			
National champion Postseason invitational champion Conference regular season champion Conference regular season and conference tournament champion Division regular season champion Division regular season and conference tournament champion Conference tournament champion

=== ABA ===
Team	Year	G	W	L	W–L%	Finish	PG	PW	PL	PW–L%	Result
Denver	1969–70	28	9	19	.321	(fired)	—	—	—	—	—
