= Michael Bernard =

American basketball player-coach

Biographical details
- Born: November 8, 1948 (age 77); Brockton, Massachusetts, U.S.

Playing career
- 1966–1970: Kentucky State
- 1970–1972: Wilmington Blue Bonnets

Coaching career (HC unless noted)
- 1974–1976: Kentucky State (assistant)
- 1978–1984: Norfolk State (assistant)
- 1985–1991: North Carolina Central
- 1991–1998: Norfolk State
- 1998–2002: Fayetteville State
- 2002–2005: Shaw
- 2006–2009: Delaware State (assistant)

Administrative career (AD unless noted)
- 2009–2012: Delaware State (director of basketball operations)

Head coaching record
- Overall: 371–230 (.617)
- Tournaments: 12–5 (.706) (NCAA Division II)

Accomplishments and honors

Championships
- As player: NAIA (1970); As head coach: NCAA Division II (1989); CIAA North Division (1995); CIAA tournament (1996); As assistant coach: MEAC regular season (2007)

Awards
- Kodak Division II Coach of the Year (1989)

Michael Jerome Bernard (born November 8, 1948) is an American former basketball coach and player. He played college basketball at Kentucky State. He was selected in the 1970 NBA draft by the Cincinnati Royals.

== Early life, education, and playing career ==
Born and raised in Brockton, Massachusetts, Bernard graduated from Brockton High School in 1964. Bernard played college basketball at Kentucky State, graduating in 1970, the year Kentucky State won the NAIA national championship. In the 1970 NBA draft, the Cincinnati Royals selected Bernard in the seventh round, 107th overall. Bernard played professionally for the Wilmington Blue Bonnets of the Eastern Basketball Association from 1970 to 1972.

Bernard studied political science at Atlanta University (now Clark Atlanta University) during the 1976–77 school year.

== Coaching career ==
Returning to Kentucky State, Bernard began his coaching career in 1974 as an assistant coach. After two seasons at Kentucky State, Bernard was an assistant coach at Norfolk State, then in NCAA Division II, from 1978 to 1984.

In 1985, Bernard got his first head coaching position at North Carolina Central, a Division II school at the time. Accumulating a 115–56 record, Bernard was head coach at North Carolina Central from 1985 to 1991. Bernard led the Eagles to a 28–4 record and NCAA Division II national championship in the 1988–89 season, for which he was named Division II Coach of the Year by Kodak.

Bernard was then head coach at Norfolk State from 1991 to 1998, going 141–67 in seven seasons. Under Bernard, Norfolk State made two deep runs in the NCAA Division II Tournament, qualifying for the Final Four in 1994 and Elite Eight in 1995. Bernard's final season at Norfolk State was in 1997–98, when the team went 6–21 in the school's first season at the Division I level.

From 1998 to 2002, Bernard was head coach at Division II Fayetteville State, going 65–44 in four seasons. However, in August 2002, the Fayetteville Observer reported that Bernard falsely claimed in his résumé to have completed a master's degree at Clark Atlanta, leading Fayetteville State to start an investigation. On August 8, the day the Observer story was published, Fayetteville State decided to fire Bernard.

Bernard became head coach at Shaw on September 9, 2002, days after the resignation of Joel Hopkins.

He was an assistant coach at Delaware State under head coach Greg Jackson from 2006 to 2009. Then from 2009 to 2012, he served as director of basketball operations on Jackson's staff.

== Head coaching record ==
Record table
Season	Team	Overall	Conference	Standing	Postseason
North Carolina Central Eagles (Central Intercollegiate Athletic Association) (1985–1991)
1985–86	North Carolina Central	14–12	8–4		
1986–87	North Carolina Central	15–13			
1987–88	North Carolina Central	26–3	18–1		NCAA Division II second round
1988–89	North Carolina Central	28–4	14–3		NCAA Division II champions
1989–90	North Carolina Central	23–5	16–3		NCAA Division II second round
1990–91	North Carolina Central	9–19	7–12		
North Carolina Central:		115–56 (.673)			
Norfolk State Spartans (Central Intercollegiate Athletic Association) (1991–1997)
1991–92	Norfolk State	22–10	14–5	2nd (North)	NCAA Division II first round
1992–93	Norfolk State	19–10	11–8	3rd (North)	
1993–94	Norfolk State	27–6	15–4	2nd (North)	NCAA Division II Elite Eight
1994–95	Norfolk State	27–6	16–3	T–1st (North)	NCAA Division II Final Four
1995–96	Norfolk State	23–4	14–3	2nd (North)	
1996–97	Norfolk State	17–10	11–6	3rd (North)	
Norfolk State Spartans (Mid-Eastern Athletic Conference) (1997–1998)
1997–98	Norfolk State	6–21	0–0		
Norfolk State:		141–67 (.678)	87–50 (.635)		
Fayetteville State Broncos (Central Intercollegiate Athletic Association) (1998–2002)
1998–99	Fayetteville State	13–12	8–8	4th (Western)	
1999–2000	Fayetteville State	16–11	8–8	4th (Western)	
2000–01	Fayetteville State	15–11	7–9	T–3rd (Western)	
2001–02	Fayetteville State	17–8	11–5	3rd (Western)	
Fayetteville State:		75–61 (.551)	34–30 (.531)		
Shaw Bears (Central Intercollegiate Athletic Association) (2002–2005)
2002–03	Shaw	21–9	11–5	T–2nd (Eastern)	
2003–04	Shaw	12–16	8–8	T–3rd (Eastern)	
2004–05	Shaw	7–21	5–11	4th (Eastern)	
Shaw:		40–46 (.465)	24–24 (.500)		
Total:		371–230 (.617)			
National champion Postseason invitational champion Conference regular season champion Conference regular season and conference tournament champion Division regular season champion Division regular season and conference tournament champion Conference tournament champion
