= Erace =

Erace may refer to:

- ERACE, an anti-racism organization
- Sim racing, sometimes called eRacing
- ERACE, 1997 album by The Gotee Brothers
