= 1957–58 Tennessee A&I State Tigers basketball team =

American college basketball season

1957–58 Tennessee A&I State Tigers men's basketball

NAIA tournament National Champions
- Conference: Independent
- Record: 31–3
- Head coach: John McLendon (4th season)
- Home arena: Kean Hall

The 1957–58 Tennessee A&I State Tigers basketball team represented Tennessee A&I State College (now called Tennessee State University) in National Association of Intercollegiate Athletics (NAIA) men's basketball during the 1957–58 season. Coached by fourth-year head coach John McLendon, the Tigers finished the season with a 31–3 record and were crowned NAIA national champions by winning the 1958 NAIA tournament. This marked the second of three consecutive national championships, a feat that no other team at any level of college basketball had previously accomplished. In 2019, all three national championship teams were inducted into the Naismith Memorial Basketball Hall of Fame.

== Individual honors ==
- Associated Press Little All-America – Dick Barnett
- NAIA All-America – Dick Barnett, John Barnhill
- NAIA Tournament MVP – Dick Barnett
