= Tennessee State Tigers basketball =

College basketball team

2026–27 Tennessee State Tigers basketball team
- University: Tennessee State University
- Head coach: Nolan Smith (2nd season)
- Location: Nashville, Tennessee
- Arena: Gentry Complex (capacity: 9,100)
- Conference: Ohio Valley
- Nickname: Tigers
- Colors: Reflex blue and white

NCAA Division I tournament runner-up
- 1970*, 1973*
Other NCAA Division I tournament results
Final Four	1970*, 1972*, 1973*, 1975*
Elite Eight	1970*, 1972*, 1973*, 1975*
Sweet Sixteen	1970*, 1971*, 1972*, 1973*, 1975*
Appearances	1967*, 1970*, 1971*, 1972*, 1973*, 1974*, 1975*, 1993, 1994, 2026

NAIA tournament champions
- 1957, 1958, 1959
Other NAIA tournament results
Semifinals	1957, 1958, 1959, 1960

Conference tournament champions
- 1993, 1994, 2026

Conference regular-season champions
- 1993, 1995, 2026
- * at Division II level

The Tennessee State Tigers basketball team represents Tennessee State University (TSU) in Nashville, Tennessee, United States. The school's team currently competes in the NCAA Division I's Ohio Valley Conference. They play their home games at the Gentry Complex and are led by first-year head coach Nolan Smith.

While they were a member of the NAIA, they were three time national champions (1957, 1958, 1959). TSU was the first team to win three consecutive basketball national championships at any level of college basketball – a feat only repeated by UCLA (seven straight championships from 1967–1973) and Kentucky State (1970, 1971, 1972). The 1957 championship made TSU the first historically black college to win a national championship. The team was coached by Harold Hunter from 1960 to 1968. Hunter still holds the record as the second-winningest men's basketball coach in Tennessee State's history. Hunter had succeeded outgoing coach John McLendon, who left in 1959.

The Tigers joined NCAA Division I for the 1977–78 season and joined the OVC for the 1986–87 season. Since joining Division I, Tennessee State has appeared three times in the NCAA Tournament, most recently in 2026.

Seventeen former Tennessee State Tigers have played in the NBA; the best known are Ben Warley, Robert Covington, Dick Barnett, John Barnhill, Truck Robinson, Anthony Mason and Carlos Rogers.

== Postseason results ==
=== NCAA Division I Tournament results ===
The Tigers have appeared in three NCAA Division I Tournaments. Their combined record is 0–3.

Year	Round	Opponent	Result
1993	First round	Seton Hall	L 59–81
1994	First round	Kentucky	L 70–83
2026	First Round	Iowa State	L 74–108

=== NCAA Division II Tournament results ===
The Tigers have appeared in seven NCAA Division II Tournaments. Their record is 18–8.

Year	Round	Opponent	Result
1967	Regional Semifinals; Regional Third Place	South Carolina State; Stetson	L 59–66; W 65–53
1970	Regional Semifinals; Regional Finals; Elite Eight; Final Four; National Championship Game	Bellarmine; Kentucky Wesleyan; South Dakota State; Buffalo State; Philadelphia	W 82–77; W 75–73; W 92–89; W 101–80; L 65–76
1971	Regional Semifinals; Regional Finals	Louisiana Tech; Louisiana–Lafayette	W 92–91 ^{OT} L 82–86
1972	Regional Semifinals; Regional Finals; Elite Eight; Final Four; National Third Place game	New Orleans; Delta State; Southampton; Akron; Eastern Michigan	W 80–79; W 79–73; W 95–55; L 69–71 ^{OT} W 107–82
1973	Regional Semifinals; Regional Finals; Elite Eight; Final Four; National Championship Game	Transylvania; Southeastern Louisiana; Akron; Assumption; Kentucky Wesleyan	W 53–45; W 62–54 ^{OT} W 54–50; W 106–76; L 76–78 ^{OT}
1974	Regional Semifinals; Regional Third Place	Fisk; Southern	L 54–65; W 98–88
1975	Regional Semifinals; Regional Finals; Elite Eight; Final Four; National Third Place	Armstrong Atlantic State; Chattanooga; Akron; Old Dominion; Assumption	W 63–53; W 82–81; W 72–69; L 60–77; L 80–88

=== NAIA Tournament results ===
The Tigers have appeared in seven NAIA Tournaments. Their combined record is 23–4 and are three time national champions (1957, 1958, 1959). Those same teams were later announced as inductees into the Naismith Memorial Basketball Hall of Fame on April 6, 2019, with those teams being "the first collegiate team to win back-to-back-to-back championships."

Year	Round	Opponent	Result
1953	First round Second Round; Quarterfinals	Geneva; Benedictine (KS); Texas A&M–Commerce	W 89–88; W 79–56; L 67–72
1954	First round	Regis (CO)	L 58–61
1956	First round Second Round; Quarterfinals	Indianapolis; Wisconsin-Eau Claire; McNeese State	W 84–76; W 62–61; L 68–76
1957	First round Second Round; Quarterfinals; Semifinals; National Championship Game	Adrian; Portland; Western Illinois; Pacific Lutheran; Southeastern Oklahoma State	W 87–69; W 87–70; W 90–88; W 71–70; W 92–73
1958	First round Second Round; Quarterfinals; Semifinals; National Championship Game	Northern Michigan; Anderson (IN); Texas A&M-Commerce; Texas Southern; Western Illinois	W 113–45; W 77–56; W 81–62; W 110–85; W 85–73
1959	First round Second Round; Quarterfinals; Semifinals; National Championship Game	Nebraska Wesleyan; Youngstown State; Illinois State; Texas State; Pacific Lutheran	W 75–57; W 89–80; W 131–74; W 64–62; W 97–87
1960	First round Second Round; Quarterfinals; Semifinals; National 3rd-place game	Midwestern State; West Virginia Wesleyan; Wofford; Westminster (PA); William Jewell	W 102–83; W 84–79; W 75–60; L 38–39; W 100–65

=== CIT results ===
The Tigers have appeared in three CollegeInsider.com Postseason Tournaments (CIT). Their combined record is 0–3. They accepted an invitation to the 2020 CIT before it was cancelled amid the COVID-19 pandemic.

Year	Round	Opponent	Result
2012	First round	Mercer	L 60–68
2013	First round	Evansville	L 72–84
2016	First round	Ball State	L 73–78 ^{2OT}
2020	First round		Cancelled
