= 1956–57 Tennessee A&I State Tigers basketball team =

American college basketball season

1956–57 Tennessee A&I State Tigers men's basketball

NAIA tournament National Champions
- Conference: Independent
- Record: 31–4
- Head coach: John McLendon (3rd season)
- Home arena: Kean Hall

The 1956–57 Tennessee A&I State Tigers basketball team represented Tennessee A&I State College (now called Tennessee State University) in National Association of Intercollegiate Athletics (NAIA) men's basketball during the 1956–57 season. Coached by third-year head coach John McLendon, the Tigers finished the season with a 31–4 record and were crowned NAIA national champions by winning the 1957 NAIA tournament. This marked the first of three consecutive national championships, a feat that no other team at any level of college basketball had previously accomplished. In addition, the 1956–57 team became the first historically black college to win a national basketball title. In 2019, all three national championship teams were inducted into the Naismith Memorial Basketball Hall of Fame.

== Schedule ==
Date time, TV	Opponent	Result	Record	Site city, state
		Philander Smith	W 134-51	1-0
		Philander Smith	W 108-76	2-0
		Philander Smith	W 87-86	3-0
		Lincoln University	W 91-80	4-0
		Lincoln University	W 114-74	5-0
		Arkansas-Pine Bluff	W 94-75	6-0
		Arkansas-Pine Bluff	W 83-64	7-0
		Knoxville	W 118-100	8-0
		Knoxville	W 113-81	9-0
		Kentucky St	W 79-75	10-0
		Kentucky St	W 95-71	11-0
		Grambling	L 75-76	11-1
		Grambling	W 98-74	12-1
		Central State	W 89-63	13-1
		Central State	W 92-78	14-1
		Jackson College	L 73-79	14-2
		Jackson College	W 84-81	15-2
		Omaha University	W 96-80	16-2
		South Dakota State	L 85-95	16-3
		South Dakota State	W 88-74	17-3
		Illinois State	W 98-91	18-3
		Rockhurst	L 63-71	18-4
		North Dakota	W 84-51	19-4
		Rockhurst	W 69-57	20-4
		Dillard	W 79-61	21-4
		Xavier University	W 85-73	22-4
		Grambling	W 118-94	23-4
		Kentucky St	W 89-74	24-4
		North Carolina A&T	W 91-72	25-4
		Winston-Salem	W 100-80	26-4
		Adrian College	W 87-69	27-4
		Portland University	W 87-60	28-4
		Western Illinois	W 90-88	29-4
		Pacific Lutheran	W 71-70	30-4
		Southeastern Oklahoma State	W 92-73	31-4
*Non-conference game. ^{#}Rankings from AP Poll. (#) Tournament seedings in parentheses.

== Individual honors ==
- Associated Press Little All-America – Dick Barnett
- NAIA All-America – Dick Barnett, John Barnhill, James Satterwhite
