= Portland Pilots men's basketball =

College basketball team of the University of Portland

2026–27 Portland Pilots men's basketball team
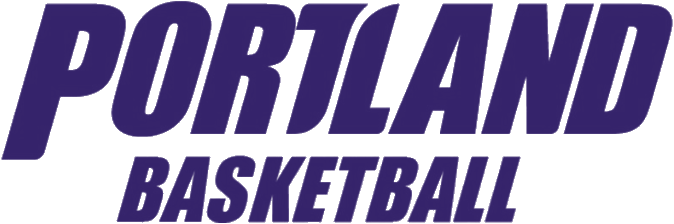
- University: University of Portland
- Head coach: Shantay Legans (6th season)
- Location: Portland, Oregon
- Arena: Chiles Center (capacity: 4,852)
- Conference: West Coast Conference
- Nickname: Pilots
- Colors: Purple and white

NCAA Division I tournament appearances
- 1959, 1996

Conference tournament champions
- 1996

Uniforms
Home	Away	Alternate

The Portland Pilots men's basketball team represents the University of Portland, located in Portland, Oregon, United States, in NCAA Division I basketball competition. They have played their home games at the Chiles Center since 1984, and are members of the West Coast Conference. The Pilots have appeared two times in the NCAA Division I men's basketball tournament, most recently in 1996.

== Postseason results ==
=== NCAA tournament ===
The Pilots have appeared in two NCAA tournaments. Their combined record is 0–2.

Year	Seed	Round	Opponent	Result
1959		Round of 23	DePaul	L 56–57
1996	#14	Round of 64	#3 Villanova	L 58–92

=== CIT results ===
The Pilots have appeared in four CollegeInsider.com Tournaments. Their combined record is 0–4.

Year	Round	Opponent	Result
2009	First Round	Pacific	L 76–82
2010	First Round	Northern Colorado	L 73–81
2011	First Round	Hawaii	L 64–76
2015	First Round	Sacramento State	L 66–73

=== The Basketball Classic results ===
The Pilots have appeared in one The Basketball Classic Tournament. Their record is 1–1

Year	Round	Opponent	Result
2022	First Round; Quarterfinals	New Orleans; Southern Utah	W 94–73; L 66–77

=== NAIA tournament results ===
The Pilots have appeared in the NAIA Tournament eight times. Their combined record is 5–9.

Year	Round	Opponent	Result
1949	First Round	SW Missouri State	L 56–59
1950	First Round; Second Round	Montana State; Central Washington	W 48–47; L 43–51
1951	First Round	Memphis State	L 74–76
1952	First Round; Second Round; Quarterfinals; Semifinals; National 3rd Place Game	Findlay; Memphis State; Hamline; Murray State; SW Texas State	W 84–82; W 72–48; W 75–65; L 57–58; L 68–78
1953	First Round	Loyola (MD)	L 64–66
1954	First Round	East Texas State	L 59–72
1957	First Round; Second Round	Austin Peay; Tennessee State	W 77–65; L 70–87
1958	First Round	Coe	L 61–63

== Venues ==
- Columbia Coliseum, 1922–27
- Howard Hall, 1927–1978, 1980–85
- Portland Ice Arena 1949–1953
- Pacific International Livestock Exposition Building 1951–53, 1958–1960
- First Regiment Armory Annex 1953–58
- Hudson's Bay High School 1956–1966, 1978–1982
- Memorial Coliseum, 1960–1984
- Pamplin Sports Center, 1979–1983
- Chiles Center, 1984–present

== Pilots in professional leagues ==
- Pinhas Hozez (born 1957), Israeli basketball player, Israeli Basketball Premier League
- Luke Sikma (born 1989), American basketball player; son of NBA Hall of Famer Jack Sikma, ALBA Berlin, EuroLeague
- Darwin Cook (born 1958)
- Erik Spoelstra (born 1970)
- Jose Slaughter (born 1960)
- Eugene Jeter (born 1983), played briefly for the Sacramento Kings and more widely in other professional leagues; brother of Olympic sprinter Carmelita Jeter
- Ben Sullivan (born 1984)
