= Corey Lowery (basketball) =

American basketball coach

Current position
- Title: Head coach
- Team: Texas Southern
- Conference: SWAC
- Record: 0–0 (–)

Biographical details
- Education: Rutgers

Coaching career (HC unless noted)
- 2005–2006: Bloomfield College (assistant)
- 2006–2010: Middlesex College
- 2011–2017: Essex County College
- 2020–2022: Lincoln University
- 2022–2026: Seton Hall (assistant)
- 2026–present: Texas Southern

Administrative career (AD unless noted)
- 2018–2020: Saint Peter's (DPD)

Accomplishments and honors

Championships
- As assistant: NIT champion (2024)

Corey Lowery is an American college basketball coach who is currently the head coach at Texas Southern.

== Coaching career ==
Lowery began his coaching career at Hillside High School, where he led the program to a conference championship and two state championship appearances.

He then served as the head coach at Middlesex College, leading the team to three consecutive conference championships, a region championship and an appearance in the NJCAA Division III Tournament Elite Eight in 2008.

Lowery next spent six seasons as the head coach at Essex County College, leading the Wolverines to six consecutive regular-season conference championships, five consecutive region championships and five consecutive appearances in the NJCAA Division II Tournament. Essex County finished as the national runner-up in 2014 and reached the national Final Four in 2014 and 2016.

From 2018 to 2020, Lowery served as director of player development at Saint Peter's.

Lowery then served as the head men's basketball coach at Lincoln University for two seasons. His first season began with a 3–0 record before the season was discontinued due to the COVID-19 pandemic. In his first full season in 2021–22, Lowery led Lincoln to a second-place finish in the CIAA Northern Division after the Lions had been picked to finish 10th in the preseason poll. He was named CIAA Coach of the Year, while Zahrion Blue was selected as CIAA Player of the Year and Bakir Cleveland earned CIAA All-Rookie Team honors. Lowery also coached in the inaugural HBCU All-Star Game.

Lowery then joined Seton Hall as an assistant coach, serving for four seasons. During his tenure, the Pirates earned 42 wins over his first two seasons, the most in program history for a coaching staff in its first two seasons, and won the 2024 NIT Championship.

Lowery joined Texas Southern following his tenure at Seton Hall, becoming the 13th head men's basketball coach in its schools history.

== Head coaching record ==
Record table
| Season | Team | Overall | Conference | Standing | Postseason |
|---|---|---|---|---|---|
Texas Southern (SWAC) (2026–present)
| 2026–27 | Texas Southern | 0–0 | 0–0 | | |
| Texas Southern: | | 0–0 (–) | 0–0 (–) | | |
| Total: | | 0–0 (–) | | | |
National champion Postseason invitational champion Conference regular season champion Conference regular season and conference tournament champion Division regular season champion Division regular season and conference tournament champion Conference tournament champion
