= Scotty Steagall =

American basketball player

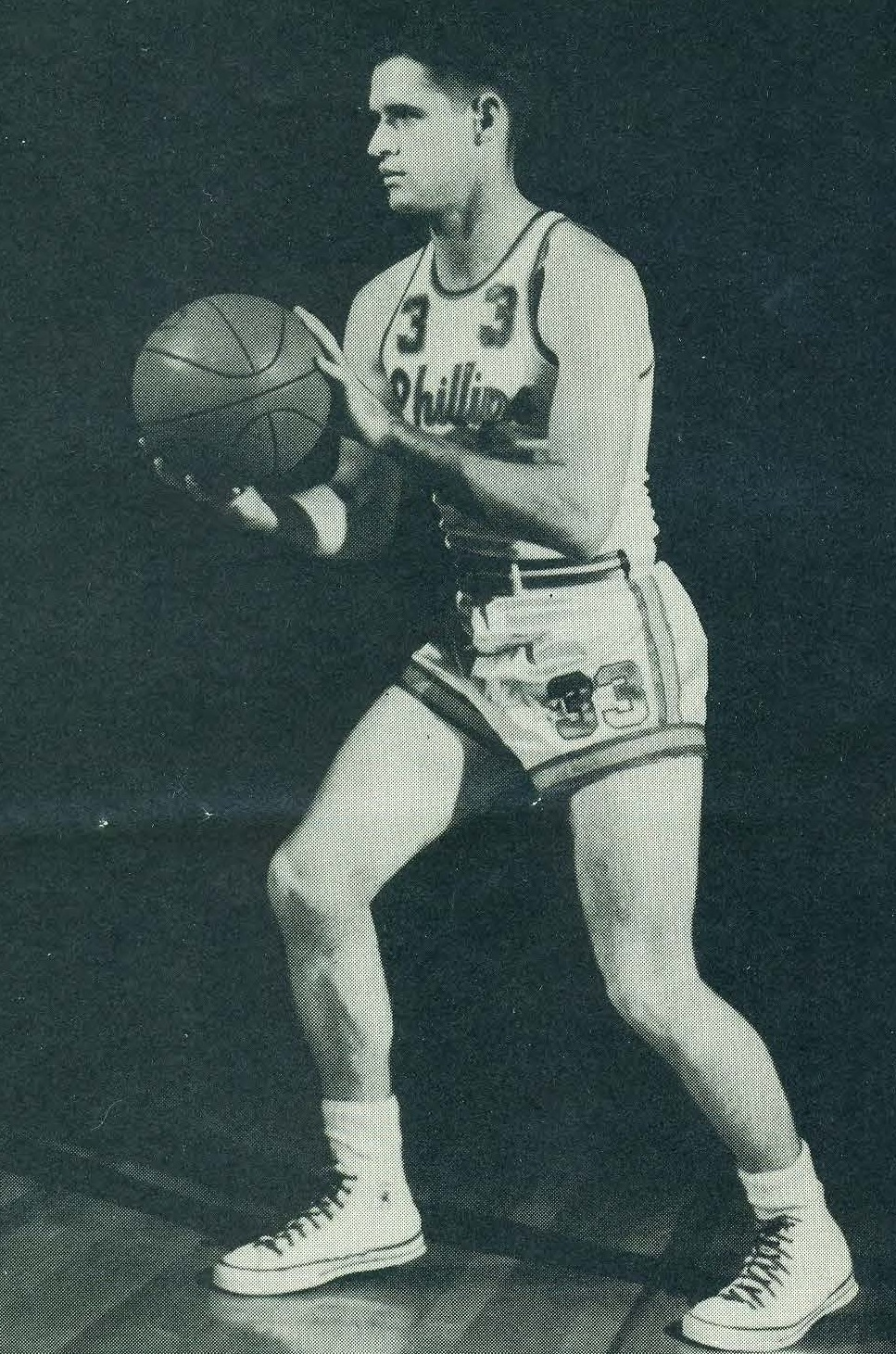
- Steagall with the Phillips 66ers.

Personal information
- Born: November 13, 1929
- Died: September 16, 2001 (aged 71)
- Listed height: 5 ft 11 in (1.80 m)
- Listed weight: 170 lb (77 kg)

Career information
- High school: Stewardson (Shelby County, Illinois)
- College: Millikin (1947–1951)
- NBA draft: 1951: 2nd round, 12th overall pick
- Drafted by: Indianapolis Olympians
- Position: Forward
- Number: 33

Career history
- 1951–1952: Phillips 66ers
- 1953–1954: Phillips 66ers

Career highlights
- First-team All-American – Converse (1951); NAIA tournament MVP (1951); Small College national scoring champion (1951)
- Stats at Basketball Reference

Scotty Steagall (November 13, 1929 – September 16, 2001) was an American basketball player. After a collegiate career at Millikin University, Steagall was selected in the second round (12th overall) of the 1951 NBA draft by the Indianapolis Olympians. He skipped the NBA, however, and opted instead to play in the Amateur Athletic Union for the Phillips 66ers, one of the most dominant teams in amateur basketball during the mid-20th century.

== College career ==
Steagall had a prolific career at Millikin between 1947 and 1951. During his four years as a member of the Big Blue, he scored 2,127 points and led all small colleges in scoring nationally as a senior. That season he scored 888 points in 31 games for an average of 28.6 points per game. In addition to the scoring average, Steagall also led the nation in total field goals (314), free throws (260), and assists (122). He guided Millikin to a berth in the NAIA national championship game, but despite losing to Hamline, Steagall was named the NAIA Tournament MVP. Converse named him a first team All-American for his outstanding play during 1950–51.

His scoring bursts were not limited to his senior season, however. As a freshman in 1947–48, Steagall averaged 12.0 points per game, increased it to 21.2 as a sophomore, then 23.9 as a junior. He set the then-single game scoring mark for small colleges with a 59-point effort against Augustana College.

== AAU career ==
After college, Steagall bypassed an NBA career despite being drafted by the Indianapolis Olympians. He signed to work in the sales department for the Phillips Petroleum Company in Bartlesville, Oklahoma. He was to also play for their company team, the Phillips 66ers, in the Amateur Athletic Union. After one season with the team in 1951–52, Steagall had to serve in the United States military to fight in the Korean War, thus missing the 1952–53 season. He returned in November 1953 and re-joined the 66ers, but lasted just one more season before being cut in March 1954.

In 1972, Steagall was elected into the Millikin Hall of Fame.
