= 1960 NAIA basketball tournament =

College basketball tournament

1960 NAIA men's basketball tournament
- Season: 1959–60
- Teams: 32
- Finals site: Municipal Auditorium, Kansas City, Missouri
- Champions: Southwest Texas State (1st title, 1st title game, 3rd Final Four)
- Runner-up: Westminster (Pa.) (1st title game, 1st Final Four)
- Semifinalists: Tennessee State (4th Final Four); William Jewell (Mo.) (1st Final Four)
- Coach of the year: Milt Jowers (Southwest Texas State)
- Charles Stevenson Hustle Award: Chuckie Davis (Westminster (Pa.))
- MVP: Charles Sharp (Southwest Texas State)

The 1960 NAIA men's basketball tournament was held in March at Municipal Auditorium in Kansas City, Missouri. The 23rd annual NAIA basketball tournament featured 32 teams playing in a single-elimination format.

The pivotal game in this year's tournament was in the semifinals round when #4 Westminster College knocked off the three time defending national champions #1 Tennessee State University. This ended the 18 tournament win streak. As of 2017, it is still the tournament's longest win streak. Tennessee State would then play in the 3rd-place game where they easily defeated William Jewell College 100–65. (William Jewell's highest finish in the DI tournament, as of 2010).

Westminster went to the championship game and was defeated by Southwest Texas State 44–66. The Bobcats finish with their first national championship, after being in the NAIA Final Four two previous times, 1952, 1959, both finishing 3rd.

== Awards and honors ==
Many of the records set by the 1960 tournament have been broken, and many of the awards were established much later:

- Leading scorer: est. 1963
- Leading rebounder: est. 1963
- Player of the Year: est. 1994
- Most consecutive tournament victories; record ends: 18 overall; 3 in 1960, Tennessee State, 1957-58-59-60
- Top single-game performances: Charles Sharp, 16th, Southwest Texas State vs. Wisconsin-Oshkosh, In that game Sharp scored 15 field goals and 14 free throws, totaling 44 points.
- All-time leading scorer; first appearance: Hershell West, 15th Grambling (La.) (1960,61,63), 13 games, 116 field goals, 37 free throws, 269 total points, 20.7 average per game.
- All-time leading scorer; final appearance: Charles Sharp, 5th Southwest Texas State (1957,59,60) 12 games, 118 field goals, 69 free throws, 305 total points, 25.4 average per game.

== 1960 NAIA bracket ==
First round	Second round
1	Tennessee State	102
-	Midwestern (Texas)	83
1	Tennessee State	84
16	West Virginia Wesleyan	79
-	Valley City State (N.D.)	84
16	West Virginia Wesleyan	109
TOP TIER
9	Pittsburg State (Kan.)	61
-	Findlay (Ohio)	76
-	Findlay	73
8	Wofford	80
-	Oakland City (Ind.)	85*
8	Wofford (S.C.)	86
5	Hamline (Minn.)	88
-	Florence State (Ala.)	83**
5	Hamline	89
-	Arkansas A&M	76
-	Arkansas A&M	64
12	Western Washington State	53
TOP TIER
13	Whittier (Calif.)	77
-	Ferris Institute (Mich.)	71
13	Whittier	50
4	Westminster	59
-	Maryland State	63
4	Westminster (Pa.)	64
3	Southern Illinois	71
-	Oklahoma Baptist	75
-	Oklahoma Baptist	67
-	New Mexico Highlands	77
-	New Mexico Highlands	96
14	Nebraska Wesleyan	90
BOTTOM TIER
7	Stetson (Fla.)	66
-	William Jewell (Mo.)	68
-	William Jewell	73
-	Parsons	71
-	Parsons (Iowa)	67
10	Christian Brothers (Tenn.)	65
11	Villa Madonna (Ky.)	94
-	College of Idaho	70
11	Villa Madonna	97
6	Grambling State	113
-	Central Connecticut State	68
6	Grambling State (La.)	92
BOTTOM TIER
15	Willamette (Ore.)	71
-	Savannah State (Ga.)	85
-	Savannah State	88
2	Southwest Texas State	101
-	Oshkosh State (Wis.)	69
2	Southwest Texas State	93

Elite Eight
1	Tennessee State	75
8	Wofford	60
-	Hamline	59
4	Westminster	62
-	New Mexico Highlands	62
-	William Jewell	67
6	Grambling State	68
2	Southwest Texas State	76

NAIA national semifinals
1	Tennessee State	38
4	Westminster	39
-	William Jewell	44
2	Southwest Texas State	82

NAIA national championship
4	Westminster	44
2	Southwest Texas State	66

- * denotes each overtime.

=== 3rd-place game ===
The third-place game featured the losing teams from the national semifinalist to determine 3rd and 4th places in the tournament. This game was played until 1988.

NAIA third-place game
1	Tennessee State	100
-	William Jewell	65

== See also ==
- 1960 NCAA University Division basketball tournament
- 1960 NCAA College Division basketball tournament
