= 1954 NAIA basketball tournament =

College basketball tournament

1954 NAIA men's basketball tournament
- Season: 1953–54
- Teams: 32
- Finals site: Municipal Auditorium; Kansas City, Missouri
- Champions: St. Benedict's (KS) (1st title, 1st title game, 1st Final Four)
- Runner-up: Western Illinois (1st title game, 1st Final Four)
- Semifinalists: Southwest Missouri State (3rd Final Four); Arkansas Tech (1st Final Four)
- Coach of the year: Sam Hindsman (Arkansas Tech)
- MVP: Jerry Anderson (Southwest Missouri State)

The 1954 NAIA basketball tournament was held in March at Municipal Auditorium in Kansas City, Missouri. The 17th annual NAIA basketball tournament featured 32 teams playing in a single-elimination format.

The Southwest Missouri State Bears were out to claim an unprecedented three straight national title, but Western Illinois handed them an upset in the National Semifinals, forcing the Bears to settle for third place. The teams that played in the national championship game, were Western Illinois, and St. Benedict's (KS). St. Benedict's would defeat Western Illinois, 62–56. It was the first time these two teams had played in tournament history, and it was the first time two new teams met in the championship game since 1947.

Southwest Missouri State, now Missouri State, and the previous two time champion would settle for a third place victory over Arkansas Tech 75–61.

The 1954 tournament would see the beginning of one of the best players the NAIA had ever seen. Jim Spivey of Southeastern Oklahoma would begin his journey to most all time free throws made, and 4th on the all-time scoring list. It would also be the first year for the awarding of the Coach of the Year Award. This award goes to the best coach in the NAIA over the past year, which is not necessarily the tournament winning coach. The first award went to Sam Hindsman of Arkansas Tech.

The Georgetown Tigers make their first NAIA appearance. It would become a tournament record for most tournament appearances in 1974 with twelve, and in the 1990s would start a twenty-six year consecutive appearance streak, a tournament record.

== Awards and honors ==
Many of the records set by the 1954 tournament have been broken, and many of the awards were established much later:

- Leading scorer est. 1963
- Leading rebounder est. 1963
- Charles Stevenson Hustle Award est. 1958
- Player of the Year est. 1994
- Most free throws made; career: 120 free throws made by Jim Spivey of Southeastern Oklahoma State (1954,55,56,57). In 1954, Spivey began his four-year trek to tournament record.
- Most tournament appearances: Georgetown (Ky.) 1954 would be the first of 36, as of 2017, appearances to the NAIA Tournament
- All-time scoring leader; first appearance: James Spivey, 4th Southeastern Oklahoma State (1954,55,56,57), 13 games, 133 field goals, 120 free throws, totaling 386 points, 29.7 average per game.
- All-time scoring leader; second appearance: James Miller, 18th, East Texas State (1953,54,55), 13 games, 103 field goals, 40 free throws, totaling 246 points, 18.9 average per game.
- All-time scoring leader; third appearance: E.C. O’Neal, 9th, Arkansas Tech (1952,53,54,55), 13 games, 122 field goals, 43 free throws, totaling 287 points, 22.1 average per game.

== Bracket ==
First round	Second round
SW Missouri State	77
East Tennessee State	72
SW Missouri State	66
Gustavus Adolphus	57
Gustavus Adolphus	104
Mississippi Southern	64
TOP TIER
East Texas State	72
Portland	59
East Texas State	79
Geneva	52
Geneva	88
Indiana State	82
Rio Grande	90
Arizona State-Flagstaff	74
Western Illinois State	79
Southeastern State	74*
Southeastern State (OK)	77
Georgetown (KY)	76
TOP TIER
Southeastern Louisiana	68
Montana State	62
Southeastern Louisiana	78
Rio Grande	65
Western Illinois State	84
Morris Harvey	68
St. Peter's (NJ)	76
Wayland	63
St. Peter's	63
Regis	58
Regis	61
Tennessee A&I State	58
BOTTOM TIER
Arkansas Tech	100
Mercer	72
Arkansas Tech	85
Lawrence Tech	72
Lawrence Tech	75
Carroll (WI)	70
St. Benedict's (KS)	68
East Carolina	61
St. Benedict's	74
St. Ambrose	50
St. Ambrose	77
North Dakota	70
BOTTOM TIER
Nebraska Wesleyan	58
Whitworth	54*
Pasadena	81
Nebraska Wesleyan	74
Pasadena	79
Bridgeport	60

Elite Eight
SW Missouri State	65
East Texas State	59*
Western Illinois State	84
Southeastern Louisiana	79*
Arkansas Tech	81
St. Peter's	77
Pasadena	61
St. Benedict's	62

NAIA national semifinals
SW Missouri State	75
Western Illinois State	78
Arkansas Tech	59
St. Benedict's	63

NAIA national championship
Western Illinois State	56
St. Benedict's	62
NAIA third-place game
SW Missouri State	75
Arkansas Tech	61

- * denotes overtime.

== See also ==
- 1954 NCAA basketball tournament
- 1954 National Invitation Tournament
