= 1955 NAIA basketball tournament =

1955 men's basketball tournament

1955 NAIA men's basketball tournament
- Season: 1954–55
- Teams: 32
- Finals site: Municipal Auditorium; Kansas City, Missouri
- Champions: East Texas State (1st title, 1st title game, 2nd Final Four)
- Runner-up: Southeastern State (OK) (2nd title game, 2nd Final Four)
- Semifinalists: Western Illinois State (2nd Final Four); Arkansas Tech (2nd Final Four)
- Coach of the year: Leroy Morley (Western Illinois)
- MVP: Jim Miller (East Texas State)

The 1955 NAIA basketball tournament was held in March at Municipal Auditorium in Kansas City, Missouri. The 18th annual NAIA basketball tournament featured 32 teams playing in a single-elimination format.

The 1955 tournament featured four of the all-time leading scorers, two single-game best tournament performances, and most free throws made in tournament history.

The championship game featured East Texas State (now Texas A&M-Commerce) and Southeastern Oklahoma State. East Texas State defeated SEOSU, 71–54. The other teams in the NAIA Semifinals were Western Illinois State and Arkansas Tech. The Leathernecks defeated the Wonder Boys for the third place title, 77–74.

== Awards and honors ==
Many of the records set by the 1955 tournament have been broken, and many of the awards were established much later:

- Leading scorer est. 1963
- Leading rebounder est. 1963
- Charles Stevenson Hustle Award est. 1958
- Player of the Year est. 1994
- Most free throws made; single game: 24 free throws made by Joe Miller of Alderson-Broaddus (W.Va.) in a game verses Quincy (Ill.).
- Most free throws made; career: 120 free throws made by Jim Spivey of Southeastern Oklahoma State (1954,55,56,57).
- All-time single game performances: 5th Joe Miller of Alderson-Broaddus (W.Va.) vs. Quincy (Ill.). Miller scored 12 field goals and 24 free throws, totaling 48 points.
- All-time single game performances: 12th Paul Brownlee of Steubenville (Ohio) vs. Southeastern Oklahoma. Brownlee scored 16 field goals and 14 free throws, totaling 46 points.
- All-time scoring leader; first appearance: Bennie Swain 6th, Texas Southern (1955,56,57,58), 15 games, 119 field goals, 64 free throws, totaling 302 points, 20.1 average per game.
- All-time scoring leader; second appearance: James Spivey, 4th Southeastern Oklahoma State (1954,55,56,57), 13 games, 133 field goals, 120 free throws, totaling 386 points, 29.7 average per game.
- All-time scoring leaders; final appearance: E.C. O’Neal, 9th, Arkansas Tech (1952,53,54,55), 13 games, 122 field goals, 43 free throws, totaling 287 points, 22.1 average per game; James Miller, 18th, East Texas State (1953,54,55), 13 games, 103 field goals, 40 free throws, totaling 246 points, 18.9 average per game.

== Bracket ==
First round	Second round
Western Illinois State	76
Regis	60
Western Illinois State	86
NE Missouri State	85
NE Missouri State	82
Georgetown (KY)	70
TOP TIER
Texas Southern	102
Adrian	83
Texas Southern	55
Gustavus Adolphus	67
Gustavus Adolphus	78
Wayland	58
Steubenville	79
Mississippi Southern	62
Steubenville	90
Louisiana Tech	65
Louisiana Tech	94
Coe	65
TOP TIER
Southeastern State (OK)	120
Middle Tennessee State	67
Southeastern State	106
Nebraska Wesleyan	69
Nebraska Wesleyan	86
Geneva	80*
Southwestern (KS)	83
Loyola Los Angeles	79
Southwestern (KS)	78
East Texas State	94
East Texas State	68
Portland State	55
BOTTOM TIER
Florida State	93
Montana State	84
Florida State	88
Beloit	110
Beloit	88
Whitworth	75
Quincy	84
St. Francis (NY)	82
Quincy	84
Alderson–Broaddus	88
Alderson–Broaddus	100
Minot State	72
BOTTOM TIER
Arkansas Tech	96
New Haven State	71
Arkansas Tech	93
Atlantic Christian	74
Atlantic Christian	95
Evansville	88

Elite Eight
Western Illinois State	50
Gustavus Adolphus	49
Southeastern State	96
Steubenville	77
East Texas State	66
Beloit	57
Arkansas Tech	93
Alderson–Broaddus	74

NAIA national semifinals
Western Illinois State	61
Southeastern State	68
East Texas State	81
Arkansas Tech	66

NAIA national championship
Southeastern State	54
East Texas State	71
NAIA third-place game
Western Illinois State	77
Arkansas Tech	74

- * denotes overtime.

== See also ==
- 1955 NCAA basketball tournament
- 1955 National Invitation Tournament
