= Kentucky State Thorobreds and Thorobrettes =

- University: Kentucky State University
- Conference: Southern Intercollegiate Athletic Conference
- NCAA: Division II
- Athletic director: Grant Stepp
- Location: Frankfort, Kentucky, U.S.
- Varsity teams: 14
- Football stadium: Alumni Stadium
- Nickname: Thorobreds and Thorobrettes
- Colors: Green and gold
- Website: ksuthorobreds.com

The Kentucky State Thorobreds and Thorobrettes are the intercollegiate athletic teams that represent Kentucky State University, located in Frankfort, Kentucky, in intercollegiate sports at the Division II level of the National Collegiate Athletic Association (NCAA). The Thorobreds and Thorobrettes are members of the Southern Intercollegiate Athletic Conference (SIAC), which they have competed since the 1997–98 academic year. Kentucky State previously competed in the Great Lakes Valley Conference (GLVC) from 1989–90 to 1993–94. KSU's main rivals are Tennessee State University, West Virginia State University, and Central State University.

== Varsity teams ==
=== Facilities ===
The William Exum Center, the university's athletic and recreational complex, was named after William Exum, the first African-American varsity football player at the University of Wisconsin. Exum was hired as head of KSU's Physical Education department in 1949, and later made head of the Athletics department. He then became manager of the United States Track and Field teams at the 1972 and 1976 Olympics. Exum retired from KSU in 1980.

=== List of teams ===
Men's sports (8)

- Baseball
- Basketball
- Cross Country
- Football
- Golf
- Track & field (indoor and outdoor) (Note: The NCAA considers indoor and outdoor track & field to be two separate sports. Indoor track is part of the NCAA's winter season, with outdoor track in the NCAA spring season.)
- Volleyball

Women's sports (6)

- Basketball
- Cross country
- Softball
- Track & field (indoor and outdoor)
- Volleyball

=== Men's basketball ===
From 1970 to 1972, the Thorobreds won three straight NAIA national titles (1970, 1971, 1972). As of 2017, they are still only the second team to do so, joining Tennessee State (1957, 1958, 1959).

== National championships ==
=== Team ===
Sport	Association	Division	Year	Opponent/Runner-up	Score/Points
Men's basketball (3)	NAIA	Single	1970	Central Washington State	79–71
Men's basketball (3)	NAIA	Single	1971	Eastern Michigan	102–82
Men's basketball (3)	NAIA	Single	1972	Wisconsin–Eau Claire	71–62
Women's basketball (1)	NAIA	Single	1981	Texas Southern	73–67
Men's cross country (1)	NCAA	College	1964	NE Missouri State Teachers	95–105 (-10)
Men's outdoor track and field (1)	NCAA	College	1971	Cal Poly San Luis Obispo	42–31

== Conferences ==
=== Classifications ===
NCAA

- 1951–1972: NCAA College Division
- 1973–present: NCAA Division II

NAIA

- 1958–1969: NAIA
- 1970–1984: NAIA Division I

=== Conference affiliations ===
- 1907–08 to 1944–45: Independent
- 1945–46 to 1961–62: Midwest Athletic Association
- 1962–63 to 1963–64: Midwest Conference
- 1964–65 to 1966–67: Midwestern Conference
- 1967–68 to 1972–73: NAIA Independent
- 1973–74 to 1988–89: Division II Independent
- 1989–90 to 1993–94: Great Lakes Valley Conference
- 1994–95 to 1996–97: Division II Independent
- 1997–98 to present: Southern Intercollegiate Athletic Conference
