= Texas Southern Tigers basketball =

University sports team in Houston

Texas Southern Tigers
2026–27 Texas Southern Tigers basketball team
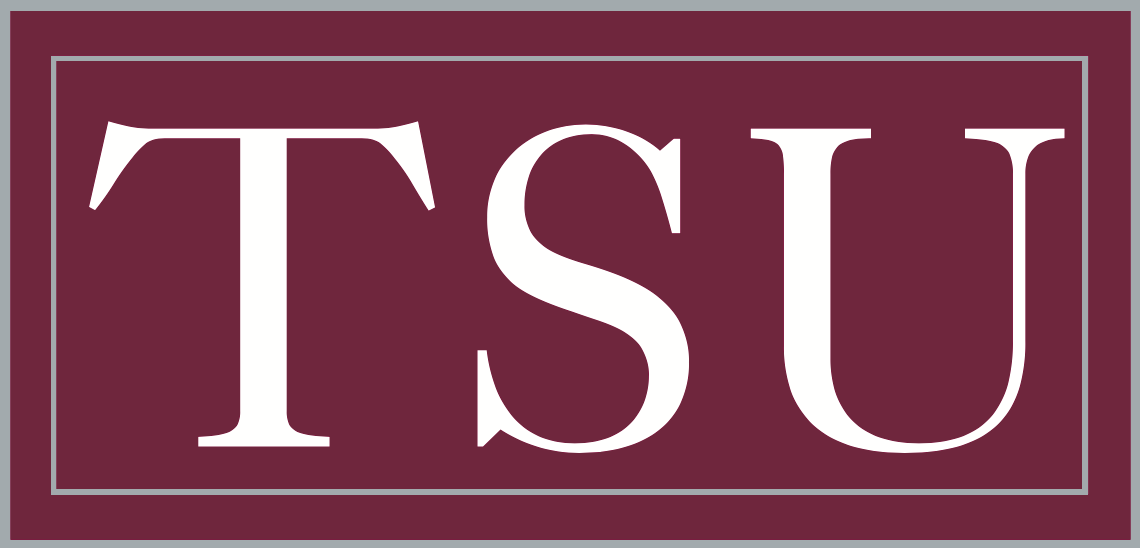
- University: Texas Southern University
- Head coach: Corey Lowery (1st season)
- Location: Houston, Texas
- Arena: Health and Physical Education Arena (capacity: 8,100)
- Conference: SWAC
- Nickname: Tigers
- Colors: Maroon and gray

NCAA Division I tournament appearances
- 1990, 1994, 1995, 2003, 2014, 2015, 2017, 2018, 2021, 2022, 2023

Conference tournament champions
- 1990, 1994, 1995, 2003, 2014, 2015, 2017, 2018, 2021, 2022, 2023

Conference regular-season champions
- 1957, 1958, 1977, 1983, 1989, 1992, 1994, 1995, 1998, 2011, 2013, 2015, 2016, 2017

The Texas Southern Tigers basketball team is the basketball team that represents Texas Southern University in Houston, Texas, United States. The team currently competes in the Southwestern Athletic Conference. They are currently led by 1st year head coach Corey Lowery Texas Southern has appeared in the NCAA tournament 11 times, and most recently in 2023. The Tigers play their home games at the Health and Physical Education Arena.

== Notable win ==
The Texas Southern Tigers defeated perennial power and nationally ranked Michigan State Spartans on December 20, 2014 in East Lansing, Michigan. The Tigers won in overtime with a score of 71–64. TSU is the first HBCU team to beat a team that went on to reach the Final Four that same season.

== Basketball rivalries ==
=== Prairie View A&M basketball rivalry ===
The Texas Southern-Prairie View A&M rivalry is the highest attended and most anticipated basketball series in the SWAC. In February 2015, the game at Texas Southern University had an attendance of 7,500+.

=== Southern University basketball rivalry ===
Since the 1990s, Texas Southern and Southern have been top contenders for the SWAC Championship every year. As a result, matchups between the schools are heavily anticipated and competitive.

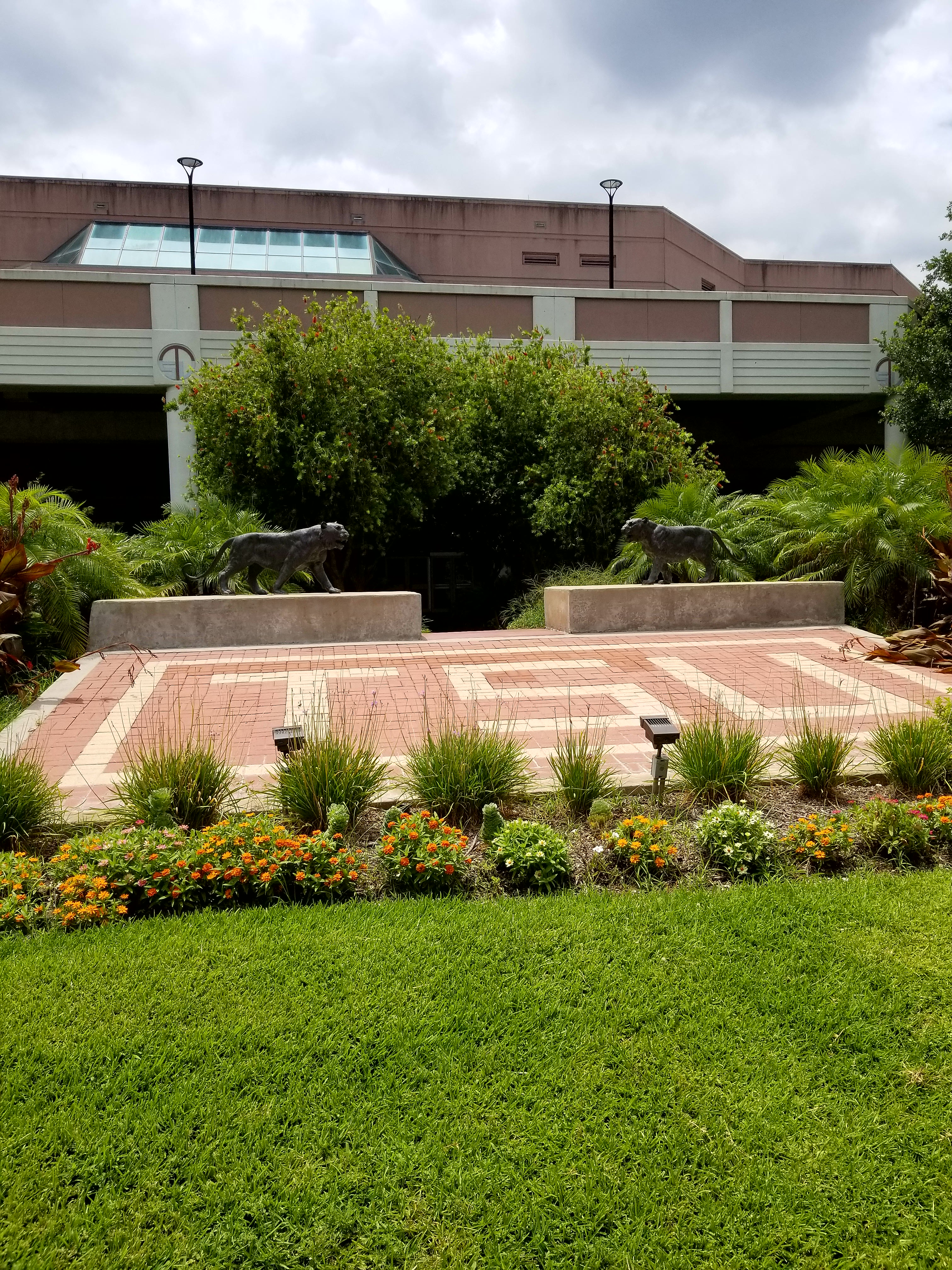
Home of TSU Basketball (H&PE Arena)

== Postseason results ==
=== NCAA tournament results ===
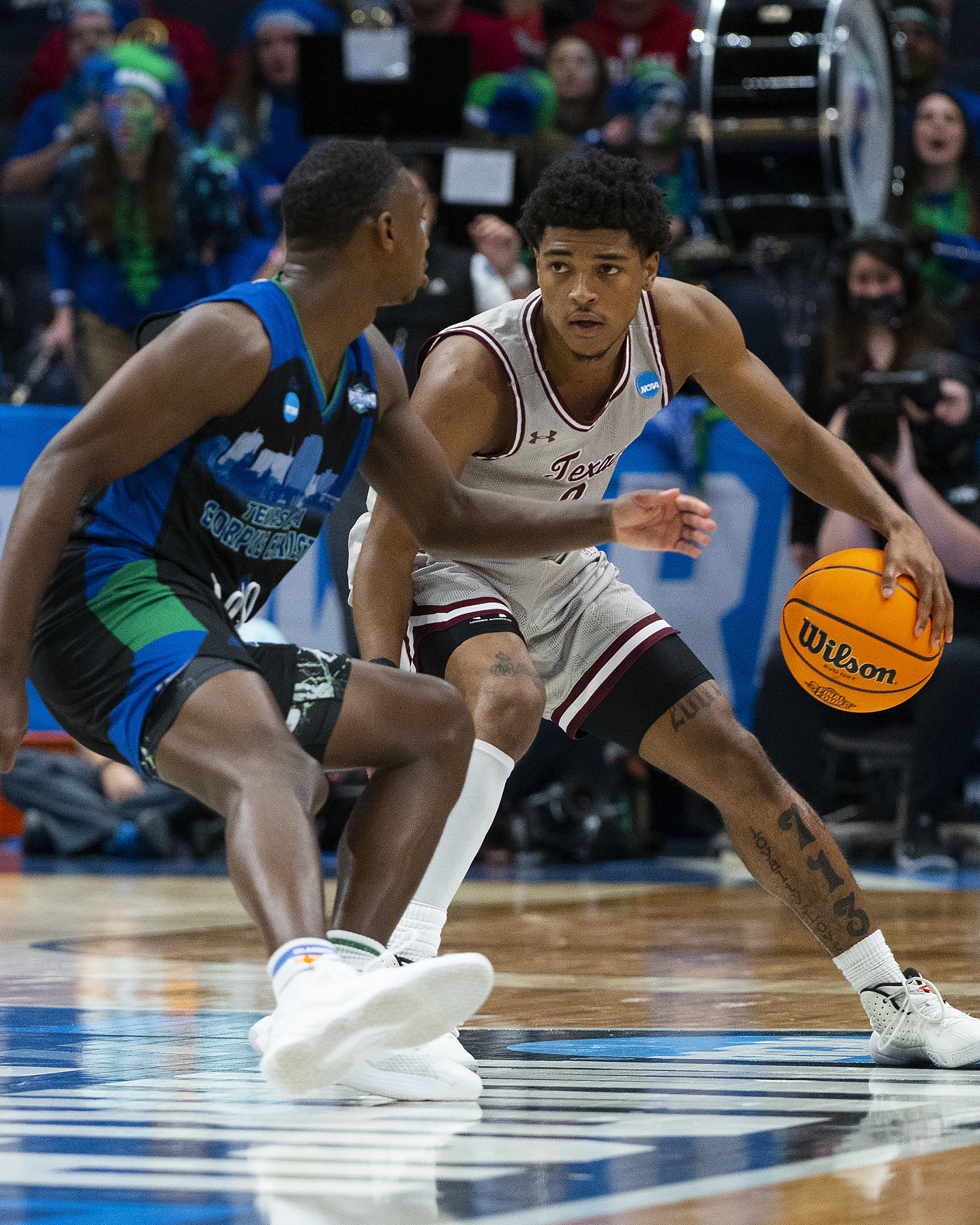
TSU's PJ Henry during the 2022 NCAA Division I men's basketball tournament

The Tigers have appeared in eleven NCAA Tournaments, the most in the conference. Their combined record is 3–11, tying them with Alcorn State for the most wins by a SWAC school in the tournament.

Year	Seed	Round	Opponent	Result
1990	#14	First Round	#3 Georgetown	L 52–70
1994	#15	First Round	#2 Duke	L 70–82
1995	#15	First Round	#2 Arkansas	L 78–79
2003	#16	Opening Round	#16 UNC Asheville	L 84–92^{OT}
2014	#16	First Four	#16 Cal Poly	L 69–81
2015	#15	First Round	#2 Arizona	L 72–93
2017	#16	First Round	#1 North Carolina	L 64–103
2018	#16	First Four; First Round	#16 North Carolina Central #1 Xavier	W 64–46; L 83–102
2021	#16	First Four; First Round	#16 Mount St. Mary's #1 Michigan	W 60–52; L 66–82
2022	#16	First Four; First Round	#16 Texas A&M–Corpus Christi #1 Kansas	W 76–67; L 56–83
2023	#16	First Four	#16 Fairleigh Dickinson	L 61–84

=== NIT results ===
The Tigers have appeared in two National Invitation Tournament (NIT). Their combined record is 0–2.

Year	Round	Opponent	Result
2011	First Round	Colorado	L 74–88
2016	First Round	Valparaiso	L 73–84

=== CIT results ===
The Tigers have appeared in the CollegeInsider.com Postseason Tournament (CIT), two times. Their record is 3–2.

Year	Round	Opponent	Result
2019	First Round; Second Round; Quarterfinals; Semifinals	New Orleans; UT–Rio Grande Valley; Louisiana–Monroe; Green Bay	W 95–89^{OT} W 94–85; W 108–102^{3OT} L 86–87^{OT}
2024	First Round	Tarleton	L 71–82

=== NAIA tournament results ===
The Tigers have appeared in the NAIA Tournament seven times. Their combined record is 18–6. They were NAIA National Champions in 1977.

Year	Round	Opponent	Result
1955	First Round; Second Round	Adrian; Gustavus Adolphus	W 102–83; L 55–67
1956	First Round; Second Round; Quarterfinals; Semifinals; National Championship Game	Hastings; Rockhust; Midwestern State; Wheaton; McNeese State	W 108–61; W 64–61; W 85–82; W 82–73; L 55–60
1957	First Round; Second Round; Quarterfinals	New Haven State; Ball State; Pacific Lutheran	W 67–66; W 97–72; L 72–91
1958	First Round; Second Round; Quarterfinals; Semifinals; National 3rd Place Game	Oklahoma Baptist; Drury; Coe; Tennessee State; Georgetown (KY)	W 79–68; W 91–61; W 98–78; L 85–101; W 121–109
1971	First Round	Fairmont State	L 78–79
1976	First Round; Second Round; Quarterfinals	West Florida; Fairmont State; Coppin State	W 81–59; W 82–75; L 77–88
1977	First Round; Second Round; Quarterfinals; Semifinals; National Championship Game	Central State; Wisconsin Parkside; East Texas State; Grand Valley State; Campbell	W 89–65; W 82–80; W 87–68; W 69–62; W 71–44

== Notable players ==
- Orlando Coleman (born 1992), basketball player for the Apollon Patras of the Greek Basket League
- Jeremy Combs (born 1995), basketball player for Israeli team Hapoel Ramat Gan Givatayim
- Marvin Jones (born 1993), basketball player in the Israeli Basketball Premier League
- Joirdon Nicholas (born 1999), basketball player for Maccabi Ashdod in the Israeli Basketball Premier League
