= 1971 NAIA basketball tournament =

College basketball tournament

1971 NAIA men's basketball tournament
- Season: 1970–71
- Teams: 32
- Finals site: Municipal Auditorium; Kansas City, Missouri
- Champions: Kentucky State (2nd title, 2nd title game, 2nd Final Four)
- Runner-up: Eastern Michigan (1st title game, 1st Final Four)
- Semifinalists: Elizabeth City State (2 Final Four); Fairmont State (3 Final Four)
- MVP: Travis Grant (Kentucky State)

The 1971 NAIA men's basketball tournament was held in March at Municipal Auditorium in Kansas City, Missouri. The 34th annual NAIA basketball tournament featured 32 teams playing in a single-elimination format.

The championship game featured Kentucky State University for the second time. It was the fourth time since seeding began in 1957 that the number one team won the tournament.

== Awards and honors ==
- Leading scorer:
- Leading rebounder:
- Player of the Year: est. 1994

== 1971 NAIA bracket ==
First round	Second round
1	Kentucky State	100
-	St. Thomas (Minn.)	66
1	Kentucky State	73
16	Central Washington State	59
-	Doane (Neb.)	73
16	Central Washington State	98
TOP TIER
9	Grambling State (La.)	88
-	Mansfield State (Pa.)	78
9	Grambling State	77*
-	Glassboro State	75
-	Glassboro State (N.J.)	71
8	East Central State (Okla.)	60
5	Indiana (Pa.)	81
-	Eastern New Mexico	72
5	Indiana	72
12	Elizabeth City State	74
-	Western New England (Mass.)	76
12	Elizabeth City State (N.C.)	90
TOP TIER
13	Illinois Wesleyan	76
-	Northern State (S.D.)	88
-	Northern State	62
4	Stephen F. Austin State	99
-	North Carolina-Asheville	73
4	Stephen F. Austin State (Tex.)	91
3	Eau Claire State (Wis.)	66
-	Southern State (Ark.)	50
3	Eau Claire State	97
14	Earlham	76
-	Lewis & Clark (Ore.)	83
14	Earlham (Ind.)	105
BOTTOM TIER
11	Whittier (Calif.)	65
-	Sacred Heart (Kan.)	59
11	Whittier	70
6	Eastern Michigan	71*
-	Ohio Dominican	81
6	Eastern Michigan	119
7	North Carolina A&T	70
-	Drury (Mo.)	53
7	North Carolina A&T	86*
10	Jackson State	73
-	Northwestern (Iowa)	91
10	Jackson State (Miss)	96
BOTTOM TIER
15	Augusta State (Ga.)	71
-	Great Falls (Mont.)	75
-	Great Falls	80
2	Fairmont State	83
-	Texas Southern	78
2	Fairmont State (W.Va.)	79

Elite Eight
1	Kentucky State	93
9	Grambling State	81
12	Elizabeth City State	90
4	Stephen F. Austin State	88
3	Eau Claire State	80
6	Eastern Michigan	87
7	North Carolina A&T	74
2	Fairmont State	78

NAIA national semifinals
1	Kentucky State	104
12	Elizabeth City State	91
6	Eastern Michigan	89
2	Fairmont State	78

NAIA national championship
1	Kentucky State	102
6	Eastern Michigan	82

- * denotes overtime.

=== Third-place game ===
The third-place game featured the losing national semifinalist teams to determine 3rd and 4th places in the tournament. This game was played until 1988.

NAIA third-place game
12	Elizabeth City State	88*
2	Fairmont State	87

== See also ==
- 1971 NCAA University Division basketball tournament
- 1971 NCAA College Division basketball tournament
