= ERACE =

Organization in New Orleans

- Founded: 1993
- Founder: Brenda Thompson and Rhoda Faust
- Purpose: Racism
- Location: New Orleans, Louisiana
- Website: https://www.eracismneworleans.org/

ERACE, also known as the Eracism Foundation, is an anti-racism organization created in New Orleans, Louisiana, in 1993 by Brenda Thompson and Rhoda Faust (respectively Black and White) in response to racist statements in letters to the editors of the Times-Picayune series "Together Apart/The Myth of Race". They created the ERACISM bumper sticker and started free, facilitated biracial discussions.

The organization seeks "ways, through person to person communication, to show that we are committed to treating fellow human beings of all colors with love and respect". Over 150,000 stickers have been distributed all over the world and over 1,200 free discussions have been held. The organization still has its home base in New Orleans and now has a chapter in Atlanta, Georgia. It does not endorse political candidates or engage in partisan politics. It is solely supported by donations and is run entirely by volunteers. Its slogan is "All colors with love and respect."

In the 1990s, the Christian music group dc Talk coincidentally founded an anti-racism foundation with a nearly identical title: the E.R.A.C.E. Foundation (Eliminating Racism and Creating Equality). Its title doubles as an acronym and a pun.
