= 1959 NAIA basketball tournament =

College basketball tournament

1959 NAIA men's basketball tournament
- Season: 1958–59
- Teams: 32
- Finals site: Municipal Auditorium; Kansas City, Missouri
- Champions: Tennessee State (3rd title, 3rd title game, 3rd Final Four)
- Runner-up: Pacific Lutheran (1st title game, 2nd Final Four)
- Semifinalists: Southwest Texas State (2nd Final Four); Fort Hays State (1st Final Four)
- Coach of the year: Bob Davis (Georgetown (Ky.))
- Charles Stevenson Hustle Award: Roger Iverson (Pacific Lutheran (Wash.))
- MVP: Dick Barnett (Tennessee State)

The 1959 NAIA men's basketball tournament was held in March at Municipal Auditorium in Kansas City, Missouri. The 22nd annual NAIA basketball tournament featured 32 teams playing in a single-elimination format. The 1959 Tournament is the first tournament to use the 16-seed system, which was used until the 2015.

The championship game again featured Tennessee State University. The Tigers defeated the Lutes of Pacific Lutheran University. It would be the first time any school would win three consecutive tournaments; a feat only repeated once, by Kentucky State, in 1970, 1971, and 1972. It was also the first tournament that didn't feature an upset in the championship game and first time a "true" number 1 seed won the tournament since seeding began in 1957.

== Awards and honors ==
Many of the records set by the 1959 tournament have been broken, and many of the awards were established much later:

- Leading scorer est. 1963
- Leading rebounder est. 1963
- Player of the Year est. 1994
- Most consecutive tournament victories; continues: 18 overall; 5 in 1959, Tennessee State, 1957-58-59-60
- Most rebounds: 32, Ken Remley, West Virginia Wesleyan vs. Whittier (Calif.)
- All-time leading scorer; second appearance: Charles Sharp, 5th Southwest Texas State (1957,59,60) 12 games, 118 field goals, 69 free throws, 305 total points, 25.4 average per game
- All-time leading scorers; final appearance: Dick Barnett, 3rd, Tennessee State (1956,57,58,59) 18 games, 186 field goals, 79 free throws, 451 total points 25.1 average per game, Charles Curtis, 8th, Pacific Lutheran (Wash.) (1956,57,58,59) 14 games 101 field goals, 85 free throws, 287 total points, 20.5 average per game, Roger Iverson, 20th, Pacific Lutheran (1956,57,58,59) 14 games, 109 field goals, 23 free throws, 241 total points, 17.2 average per game, and John Barnhill, 21st, Tennessee State (1956,57,58,59) 17 games, 104 field goals, 27 free throws, 235 total points, 13.8 average per game.

== 1959 NAIA bracket ==
First round	Second round
1	Tennessee State	75
-	Nebraska Wesleyan	57
1	Tennessee State	89
9	Youngstown	80
9	Youngstown (Ohio)	85
-	Northern State (S.D.)	76
TOP TIER
13	Culver-Stockton (Mo.)	66
-	Fairleigh Dickinson (N.J.)	77
-	Fairleigh-Dickinson	64
8	Illinois State Normal	68
-	Troy State (Ala.)	50
8	Illinois State Normal	98
5	Southwest Texas State	93
-	Linfield (Ore.)	61
5	Southwest Texas State	61
12	Westminster (Pa.)	58
-	Connecticut Teachers	76
12	Westminster (Pa.)	79
TOP TIER
-	Northern Michigan	67
16	Lenoir-Rhyne (N.C.)	90
16	Lenoir-Rhyne	88
4	Grambling State	78
-	Christian Brothers (Tenn.)	70
4	Grambling State (La.)	81
3	Pacific Lutheran (Wash.)	78
-	Western Montana	60
3	Pacific Lutheran	68
14	Central State (Okla.)	57
-	Kentucky State	65
14	Central State (Okla.)	72
BOTTOM TIER
11	Platteville State (Wis.)	84
-	Georgia Teachers	91
-	Georgia Teachers	73
6	Indiana State	70
-	Morningside (Iowa)	67
6	Indiana State	87
15	Fort Hays State (Kan.)	73
-	Westminster (Utah)	60
15	Fort Hays State	59
-	Arkansas State Teachers	48
7	Pikeville (Ky.)	67
-	Arkansas State Teachers	70
BOTTOM TIER
-	Austin (Texas)	79
10	Minnesota-Duluth	87
10	Minnesota-Duluth	75
2	West Virginia Wesleyan	90
-	Whittier (Calif.)	64
2	West Virginia Wesleyan	84

Elite Eight
1	Tennessee State	131
8	Illinois State Normal	74
5	Southwest Texas State	80
16	Lenoir-Rhyne	78
3	Pacific Lutheran	97
-	Georgia Teachers	65
15	Fort Hays State	98
2	West Virginia Wesleyan	83

NAIA national semifinals
1	Tennessee State	64
5	Southwest Texas State	62
3	Pacific Lutheran	80
15	Fort Hays State	71

NAIA national championship
1	Tennessee State	97
3	Pacific Lutheran	87

=== Third-place game ===
The third-place game featured the losing teams from the national semifinalist to determine 3rd and 4th places in the tournament. This game was played until 1988.

NAIA third-place game
5	Southwest Texas State	87
15	Fort Hays State	80

== See also ==
- 1959 NCAA University Division basketball tournament
- 1959 NCAA College Division basketball tournament
