= Dick Barnett =

American basketball player (1936–2025)

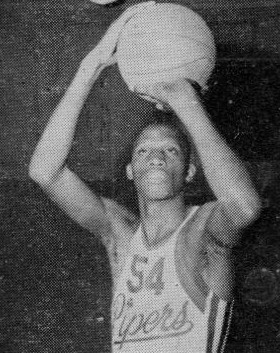

Personal information
- Born: October 2, 1936 Gary, Indiana, U.S.
- Died: April 27, 2025 (aged 88) Largo, Florida, U.S.
- Listed height: 6 ft 4 in (1.93 m)
- Listed weight: 190 lb (86 kg)

Career information
- High school: Theodore Roosevelt (Gary, Indiana)
- College: Tennessee State (1955–1959)
- NBA draft: 1959: 1st round, 4th overall pick
- Drafted by: Syracuse Nationals
- Playing career: 1959–1973
- Position: Shooting guard
- Number: 5, 12

Career history
- 1959–1961: Syracuse Nationals
- 1961–1962: Cleveland Pipers
- 1962–1965: Los Angeles Lakers
- 1965–1973: New York Knicks

Career highlights
- 2× NBA champion (1970, 1973); NBA All-Star (1968); ABL champion (1962); All-ABL First Team (1962); No. 12 retired by New York Knicks; 3× NAIA champion (1957–1959); 3× AP Little College All-American (1957–1959); 2× UPI Little College All-American (1958, 1959); 2× NAIA tournament MVP (1958, 1959)

Career NBA statistics
- Points: 15,358 (15.8 ppg)
- Rebounds: 2,812 (2.9 rpg)
- Assists: 2,729 (2.8 apg)
- Stats at NBA.com
- Stats at Basketball Reference
- Basketball Hall of Fame
- Collegiate Basketball Hall of Fame

Richard Barnett (October 2, 1936 – April 27, 2025) was an American professional basketball player who was a shooting guard in the National Basketball Association (NBA) for the Syracuse Nationals, Los Angeles Lakers, and New York Knicks. He won two NBA championships with the Knicks. Barnett was also a member of the Cleveland Pipers in the American Basketball League. He played college basketball for the Tennessee A&I State Tigers. Barnett was inducted into the Naismith Memorial Basketball Hall of Fame in 2024.

== Early years, family and education ==
Barnett was born in Gary, Indiana, on October 2, 1936 and later attended Theodore Roosevelt High School. His father was a steel worker, and his mother worked at a candy store. As a youth, Dick Barnett found work at a steel mill as well as making deliveries.

He became one of the best basketball players in the state of Indiana. His senior year, he led his team to the state basketball championship, which was the first final where two predominantly African American basketball squads faced each other. The team lost to Crispus Attucks High School and their future NBA star Oscar Robertson. He received All-state honors.

Barnett attended Tennessee A&I State College (now Tennessee State University), a historically black school. He did not graduate from there, but later he earned his bachelor's degree from Cal Poly Pomona. Years later, he earned an MBA from New York University and then a PhD in education from Fordham University.

== College athletic career ==
Barnett accepted a basketball scholarship from Tennessee A&I State College (now Tennessee State University), to play under coach John McLendon. As a freshman, he was given the nickname "Dick the Skull". He was known for his trademark "question mark" jump shot, with an unusual technique of kicking his legs back as he released the ball with his left hand, taunting the defenders by saying, "Too late; Fall back baby".

He became a three-time Associated Press Little College All-American, helping the Tigers to a 36-game winning streak and three consecutive National Association of Intercollegiate Athletics (NAIA) national championships. He received back-to-back most valuable player honors in the 1958 and 1959 NAIA tournaments. Tennessee A&I became the first historically black college to win an integrated men's basketball title.

Barnett graduated as the school's All-time scorer with 3,209 points for a 23.6 average in 136 games, while also recording 1,571 career rebounds for an 11.6 average, a career shooting percentage of 44.8 and 80.0 from the free throw line.

In 1986, he was inducted into the NAIA Hall of Fame. In 1990, the school retired his No. 12 Jersey. In 1993, he was inducted into the Indiana Basketball Hall of Fame. In 2005, he was inducted into the Tennessee Sports Hall of Fame. In 2007, he was inducted into the National Collegiate Basketball Hall of Fame, along with his coach John McLendon. In 2012, he was named to the NAIA 75th Anniversary All-Star Team. In 2016, he was inducted into the Small College Basketball Hall of Fame. In 2019, the 1957–59 Tennessee A&I Tigers men's basketball team was inducted into the Naismith Basketball Hall of Fame.

== Professional basketball career ==
=== Syracuse Nationals ===
Barnett was selected by the Syracuse Nationals (now the Philadelphia 76ers) in the first round (4th overall) of the 1959 NBA draft. He was used in a sixth man role behind guards Larry Costello and Hal Greer. As a rookie, he averaged 12.4 points per game. In the 1960–61 season, he scored 16.9 points, which ranked seventh among the league's backcourt players.

=== Cleveland Pipers ===
In 1961, he signed with the Cleveland Pipers of the American Basketball League (ABL), which were owned by George Steinbrenner (the future owner of the New York Yankees) and coached by John McLendon. He was a part of the 1961–62 ABL Championship team.

On December 21, 1961, the Nationals won a court order barring him from playing that season in the rival American Basketball League.

=== Los Angeles Lakers ===
On September 7, 1962, the Syracuse Nationals sold his player rights to the Los Angeles Lakers, for $35,000, which at the time was the highest player-for-money transaction in league history. He was also used in a sixth man role with the Lakers, behind Elgin Baylor and Jerry West. He helped the team win the Western Division title after West missed 27 games with a leg injury.

Famous Laker announcer Chick Hearn nicknamed him "Fall Back Baby". He averaged 16.8 points, 3.0 rebounds and 2.7 assists during his three seasons with the team.

=== New York Knicks ===
On October 14, 1965, Barnett was traded to the New York Knicks in exchange for Bob Boozer and cash considerations. In his first season, he led the team in scoring with a 23.1 average. In 1968, he made his only All-Star appearance.

In 1970, he helped the Knicks beat the Lakers for the NBA title. In 1973, he contributed to the team winning a second championship against the Lakers. He was released on October 23, 1973. He scored 15,358 regular season points in his career. In 1990, the Knicks retired his No. 12 jersey in the rafters of Madison Square Garden.

== Career after athletics ==
Barnett taught Sports Management at St. John's University in New York City from 2003 to 2007.

== In the media ==
Barnett was the subject of the 2022 documentary film The Dream Whisperer which chronicles the Tennessee A&I Tigers teams that won three NAIA basketball championships between 1957 and 1959.

== NBA career statistics ==
Legend
GP	Games played	GS	Games started	MPG	Minutes per game
FG%	Field goal percentage	3P%	3-point field goal percentage	FT%	Free throw percentage
RPG	Rebounds per game	APG	Assists per game	SPG	Steals per game
BPG	Blocks per game	PPG	Points per game	**Bold**	Career high
†	Won an NBA championship	*	Led the league

=== Regular season ===
Year	Team	GP	GS	MPG	FG%	3P%	FT%	RPG	APG	SPG	BPG	PPG
1959–60	Syracuse	57	–	21.7	.412	–	.711	2.7	2.8	–	–	12.4
1960–61	Syracuse	78	–	26.5	.452	–	.712	3.6	2.8	–	–	16.9
1962–63	L.A. Lakers	80*	–	31.8	.471	–	**.815**	3.0	2.8	–	–	18.0
1963–64	L.A. Lakers	78	–	33.6	.452	–	.773	3.2	3.1	–	–	18.4
1964–65	L.A. Lakers	74	–	27.4	.413	–	.799	2.7	2.1	–	–	13.8
1965–66	New York	79	–	34.5	.469	–	.772	**4.1**	3.5	–	–	**23.1**
1966–67	New York	67	–	29.4	.478	–	.783	3.4	2.4	–	–	17.0
1967–68	New York	81	–	30.7	**.482**	–	.780	2.9	3.0	–	–	18.0
1968–69	New York	**82**	–	**36.0**	.463	–	.774	3.1	3.5	–	–	17.6
1969–70†	New York	**82***	–	33.8	.475	–	.714	2.7	**3.6**	–	–	14.9
1970–71	New York	**82**	–	34.7	.456	–	.694	2.9	2.7	–	–	15.5
1971–72	New York	79	–	28.6	.437	–	.753	1.9	2.5	–	–	12.2
1972–73†	New York	51	–	10.1	.389	–	.533	0.8	1.0	–	–	3.8
1973–74	New York	5	–	11.6	.385	–	.667	0.8	1.2	**0.2**	**0.0**	4.4
Career		971	–	29.8	.456	–	.761	2.9	2.8	0.2	0.0	15.8
All-Star		1	0	22.0	.583	–	.500	0.0	1.0	–	–	15.0

=== Playoffs ===
Year	Team	GP	GS	MPG	FG%	3P%	FT%	RPG	APG	SPG	BPG	PPG
1960	Syracuse	3	–	21.3	.316	–	**.857**	**4.7**	1.3	–	–	10.0
1961	Syracuse	8	–	28.3	.438	–	.722	4.5	1.5	–	–	15.5
1963	L.A. Lakers	13	–	28.5	.470	–	.794	2.9	1.6	–	–	16.8
1964	L.A. Lakers	5	–	30.8	.404	–	.844	1.6	3.4	–	–	13.8
1965	L.A. Lakers	10	–	28.7	.480	–	.795	3.0	3.3	–	–	17.5
1968	New York	6	–	35.2	**.521**	–	.724	4.5	**3.5**	–	–	**23.8**
1969	New York	10	–	**40.2**	.399	–	.685	3.5	2.7	–	–	16.7
1970†	New York	**19**	–	37.6	.468	–	.776	2.1	3.4	–	–	16.9
1971	New York	12	–	37.9	.477	–	.698	3.2	3.0	–	–	19.5
1972	New York	12	–	10.9	.469	–	.417	0.7	0.8	–	–	4.3
1973†	New York	4	–	4.3	.500	–	–	0.0	0.5	–	–	1.5
Career		102	–	29.7	.458	–	.748	2.7	2.4	–	–	15.1

== Personal life and death ==
Barnett was known for his sharp wit, being a snappy dresser, and his love of card playing, especially poker.

On April 27, 2025, it was announced that Barnett had died overnight in his sleep in a senior living center in Largo, Florida, at the age of 88.

== See also ==
- 1957 NAIA Division I men's basketball tournament
- 1958 NAIA Division I men's basketball tournament
- 1959 NAIA Division I men's basketball tournament
- NAIA Basketball Tournament Most Valuable Player
