= 1958 NAIA basketball tournament =

College basketball tournament

1958 NAIA men's basketball tournament
- Season: 1957–58
- Teams: 32
- Finals site: Municipal Auditorium, Kansas City, Missouri
- Champions: Tennessee State (2nd title, 2nd title game, 2nd Final Four)
- Runner-up: Western Illinois (2nd title game, 3rd Final Four)
- Semifinalists: Texas Southern University (2nd Final Four); Georgetown College (Ky.) (1st Final Four)
- Coach of the year: John McClendon (Tennessee State)
- Charles Stevenson Hustle Award: Bill McAfoos (Western Illinois)
- MVP: Dick Barnett (Tennessee State)

The 1958 NAIA men's basketball tournament was held in March at Municipal Auditorium in Kansas City, Missouri. The 21st annual NAIA basketball tournament featured 32 teams playing in a single-elimination format.

The championship game featured returning champions, Tennessee State University who defeated the Western Illinois University. The Tigers won over the Leathernecks, it would be the third time a team won back-to-back championships. Tennessee State is the 5th school to win 2 National Titles, joining University of Central Missouri, Hamline University, Indiana State University and Southwest Missouri State. It was the second year in a row with an upset in the Championship Game. The 3rd-place game featured Texas Southern University and Georgetown College (Ky.) It was the first year the Charles Stevenson Hustle Award was awarded. It went to Bill McAfoos of Western Illinois.

== Awards and honors ==
Many of the records set by the 1958 tournament have been broken, and many of the awards were established much later:

- Leading scorer est. 1963
- Leading rebounder est. 1963
- Player of the Year est. 1994
- Most consecutive tournament victories; continues: 18 overall; 5 in 1958, Tennessee State, 1957-58-59-60
- All-time leading scorers; third appearance: Dick Barnett, 3rd, Tennessee State (1956,57,58,59) 18 games, 186 field goals, 79 free throws, 451 total points 25.1 average per game, Charles Curtis, 8th, Pacific Lutheran (Wash.) (1956,57,58,59) 14 games 101 field goals, 85 free throws, 287 total points, 20.5 average per game, Roger Iverson, 20th, Pacific Lutheran (1956,57,58,59) 14 games, 109 field goals, 23 free throws, 241 total points, 17.2 average per game, and John Barnhill, 21st, Tennessee State (1956,57,58,59) 17 games, 104 field goals, 27 free throws, 235 total points, 13.8 average per game.
- All-time leading scorer; final appearance: Bennie Swain, 6th Texas Southern (1955,56,57,58) 15 games, 119 field goals, 64 free throws, 302 total points, 20.1 average per game.

== 1958 NAIA bracket ==
First round
1 | Western Illinois | 74
- | Georgia Teachers | 62
- | Pasadena (Calif.) | 80
- | Hastings (Neb.) | 55
- | Platteville State (Wis.) | 77
- | Austin (Texas) | 59
- | Quincy (Ill.) | 68
8 | Youngstown (Ohio) | 88
5 | West Virginia Wesleyan | 81
- | Arkansas Tech | 75
- | Indiana State (Pa.) | 96
- | Troy State (Ala.) | 73
- | Georgetown (Ky.) | 93
- | Rider | 76
- | Eastern New Mexico | 63
4 | Pacific Lutheran (Wash.) | 76
3 | Tennessee State | 113
- | Northern Michigan | 45
- | Anderson (Ind.) | 102
- | Union (Tenn.) | 86
7 | East Texas State | 66
- | Minnesota-Duluth | 59
- | Northern State (S.D.) | 71
- | St. Benedict's (Kan.) | 52
- | Texas Southern | 79
- | Oklahoma Baptist | 68
- | Lenoir-Rhyne (N.C.) | 73
6 | Drury (Mo.) | 78
- | Western Montana | 86
- | Assumption (Mass.) | 73
- | Portland | 61
2 | Coe (Iowa) | 63

Second round
1 | Western Illinois | 83
- | Pasadena | 80
- | Platteville State | 63
8 | Youngstown | 74
5 | West Virginia Wesleyan | 93
- | Indiana State (Pa.) | 82
- | Georgetown | 92
4 | Pacific Lutheran | 91*
3 | Tennessee State | 77
- | Anderson | 56
7 | East Texas State | 63
- | Northern State | 57
- | Texas Southern | 91
6 | Drury | 61
- | Western Montana | 69
2 | Coe | 103

Elite Eight
1 | Western Illinois | 70
8 | Youngstown | 67
5 | West Virginia Wesleyan | 74
- | Georgetown | 83
3 | Tennessee State | 81
- | East Texas State | 62
- | Texas Southern | 98
2 | Coe | 78

NAIA national semifinals
1 | Western Illinois | 86
- | Georgetown | 81
3 | Tennessee State | 110
- | Texas Southern | 85

NAIA national championship
1 | Western Illinois | 73
3 | Tennessee State | 85

- * denotes overtime.

=== 3rd-place game ===
The third-place game featured the losing teams from the national semifinals to determine 3rd and 4th places in the tournament. This game was played until 1988.

| NAIA third-place game |
| - | Georgetown | 109 |
| - | Texas Southern | 121 |

== See also ==
- 1958 NCAA University Division basketball tournament
- 1958 NCAA College Division basketball tournament
