= 1970 NAIA basketball tournament =

College basketball tournament

1970 NAIA men's basketball tournament
- Season: 1969–70
- Teams: 32
- Finals site: Municipal Auditorium; Kansas City, Missouri
- Champions: Kentucky State (1st title, 1st title game, 1st Final Four)
- Runner-up: Central Washington (1st title game, 3rd Final Four)
- Semifinalists: Eastern New Mexico (2nd Final Four); Guilford (1st Final Four)
- Coach of the year: Dean Nicholson (Central Washington)
- Charles Stevenson Hustle Award: David Allen (Central Washington)
- MVP: Greg Hyder (Eastern New Mexico)
- Top scorer: Travis Grant (Kentucky State) (137 points)

The 1970 NAIA men's basketball tournament was held in March at Municipal Auditorium in Kansas City, Missouri. The 33rd annual NAIA basketball tournament featured 32 teams playing in a single-elimination format.

Kentucky State would win the first of three straight National Championship titles, becoming the second team to win three in a row, and the third team to win three titles.

The 3rd-place game would go into overtime for the second time in tournament history. The 6th seeded Eastern New Mexico State Greyhounds beat the 8th seeded Guilford Quakers 77-72 in one overtime.

== Awards and honors ==
- Leading scorer: Travis Grant, Kentucky State; 5 games, 57 field goals, 23 free throws, 137 total points (27.4 average points per game)
- Leading rebounder: Elmore Smith, Kentucky State & Greg Hyder, Eastern New Mexico; 5 games, 65 rebounds, (13 average rebounds per game)
- Player of the Year: est. 1994
- Most field goals made; career; 223; Travis Grant, Kentucky State, (1970, 71, 72)
- Most career points; individual: 518, Travis Grant, Kentucky State, (1970, 71, 72)
- All-time leading scorer; first appearance: Travis Grant, 1st (1970, 71, 72) 15 games, 223 field goals, 72 free throws, 518 points (34.5 average points per game)

== 1970 NAIA bracket ==
First round	Second round
1	Stephen F. Austin (TX)	100
-	South Carolina State	86
1	Stephen F. Austin	74
16	Augusta State	71
-	Monmouth (NJ)	64
16	Augusta State (GA)	85
TOP TIER
9	Eastern Michigan	108
-	East Central State (Okla.)	85
9	Eastern Michigan	85
8	Guilford	89
-	Wayne State (Neb.)	73
8	Guilford (N.C.)	90
5	Central State (Ohio)	69
-	St. Thomas (Minn.)	60
5	Central State (Ohio)	83
-	Wiley	77
-	Wiley (Tex.)	77
12	Drury (Mo.)	75
TOP TIER
13	Eau Claire State (Wis.)	88
-	Eastern Montana	81
13	Eau Claire State	65
4	Kentucky State	73
-	Illinois Wesleyan	56
4	Kentucky State	64
3	Central Washington State	77
-	St. Benedict's (Kan.)	65
3	Central Washington State	66
14	Wartburg	58
-	Northern State (S.D.)	78
14	Wartburg (Iowa)	91
BOTTOM TIER
11	Hanover (Ind.)	88
-	Arkansas Tech	94
-	Arkansas Tech	81
6	Eastern New Mexico	84
-	Whittier (Calif.)	66
6	Eastern New Mexico	80
7	Jackson State (Miss.)	89
-	Campbell (N.C.)	65
7	Jackson State	90
10	Northeast Louisiana	83
-	Linfield (Ore.)	72
10	Northeast Louisiana	78
BOTTOM TIER
15	Morris Harvey (W.Va.)	99
-	Western New England (Mass.)	76
15	Morris Harvey	78
2	Maryland State	88
-	California State (Pa.)	67
2	Maryland State	101

Elite Eight
1	Stephen F. Austin	94
-	Guilford	100
5	Central State (Ohio)	56
4	Kentucky State	66
3	Central Washington State	72
7	Jackson State	70
6	Eastern New Mexico	76
2	Maryland State	74*

NAIA national semifinals
-	Guilford	90
4	Kentucky State	108
3	Central Washington State	54
6	Eastern New Mexico	53

NAIA national championship
4	Kentucky State	79
3	Central Washington State	71

- * denotes overtime.

=== Third-place game ===
The third-place game featured the losing teams from the national semifinalist to determine 3rd and 4th places in the tournament. This game was played until 1988.

NAIA third-place game
-	Guilford	72*
6	Eastern New Mexico	77

== See also ==
- 1970 NCAA University Division basketball tournament
- 1970 NCAA College Division basketball tournament
