= 1957 NAIA basketball tournament =

North American college sports championship

1957 NAIA men's basketball tournament
- Season: 1956–57
- Teams: 32
- Finals site: Municipal Auditorium; Kansas City, Missouri
- Champions: Tennessee State (1st title, 1st title game, 1st Final Four)
- Runner-up: Southeastern State (2nd title game, 3rd Final Four)
- Semifinalists: Pacific Lutheran (1st Final Four); Eastern Illinois (1st Final Four)
- Coach of the year: Bloomer Sullivan (Southeastern Oklahoma State)
- MVP: Jim Spivey (Southeastern Oklahoma State)

The 1957 NAIA basketball tournament was held in March at Municipal Auditorium in Kansas City, Missouri. The 20th annual NAIA basketball tournament featured 32 teams playing in a single-elimination format.

This would be the first tournament to have seeded teams. This also means that this is the first tournament to have an 'upset'. The first upset in tournament history was when the 3 seeded West Virginia Tech lost to Villa Madonna, predecessor to today's Thomas More of Kentucky, 93–91. There were three upsets this year, including the championship game. The NAIA seeded teams 21 years prior to the NCAA Division I men's basketball tournament. The NAIA would adjust seeding to 16 seed system, in 1959. In 2016 the seeds would be adjust again, each bracket would be ranked 1-8, with the overall number 1 in the Naismith Bracket.

The championship game featured Tennessee State and Southeastern State (OK). With Tennessee State's win, they became the first historically black institution to win a collegiate basketball national championship. This would be the first of three national championship titles for Tennessee State.

The 3rd place game featured Pacific Lutheran defeating Eastern Illinois.

== Awards and honors ==
Many of the records set by the 1957 tournament have been broken, and many of the awards were established much later:

- Leading scorer est. 1963
- Leading rebounder est. 1963
- Charles Stevenson Hustle Award est. 1958
- Player of the Year est. 1994
- Most free throws made; career: 120 free throws made by Jim Spivey of Southeastern Oklahoma State (1954,55,56,57).
- Most free throws made; single-game, team: 48, Southeastern Oklahoma State vs. Southwest Texas State
- Most free throws made in one tournament; individual: 68 free throws made by Jim Spivey of Southeastern Oklahoma State (1954,55,56,57).
- Most free throws made in one tournament; team: 153, Southeastern Oklahoma State
- Most consecutive tournament victories; record start: 18 overall, 5 in 1957, Tennessee State, 1957-58-59-60
- Top single-game performances: Jim Spivey, 4th, Southeastern Oklahoma State vs. Eastern Illinois, 20 field goals, 13 free throws and 53 total points; Jim Spivey 13th, Southeastern Oklahoma State vs Southwest Texas State, 14 field goals, 18 free throws and 46 total points; Jim Spivey 20th, Southeastern Oklahoma State vs. Tennessee State, 14 field goals 15 free throws and 43 total points.
- All-time leading scorer; first appearance: Charles Sharp, 5th Southwest Texas State (1957,59,60) 12 games, 118 field goals, 69 free throws, 305 total points, 25.4 average per game
- All-time leading scorers; second appearance: Dick Barnett, 3rd, Tennessee State (1956,57,58,59) 18 games, 186 field goals, 79 free throws, 451 total points 25.1 average per game, Charles Curtis, 8th, Pacific Lutheran (Wash.) (1956,57,58,59) 14 games 101 field goals, 85 free throws, 287 total points, 20.5 average per game, Roger Iverson, 20th, Pacific Lutheran (1956,57,58,59) 14 games, 109 field goals, 23 free throws, 241 total points, 17.2 average per game, and John Barnhill, 21st, Tennessee State (1956,57,58,59) 17 games, 104 field goals, 27 free throws, 235 total points, 13.8 average per game.
- All-time leading scorer; third appearance: Bennie Swain, 6th Texas Southern (1955,56,57,58) 15 games, 119 field goals, 64 free throws, 302 total points, 20.1 average per game.
- All-time leading scorer; final appearance: James Spivey, 4th, Southeastern Oklahoma (1954,55,56,57) 13 games, 133 field goals, 120 free throws, 386 total points, 29.7 average per game.

== Bracket ==
First round	Second round
1	Pacific Lutheran	76
Elon	61
1	Pacific Lutheran	105
Stetson	83
Stetson	100
Wayne State (NE)	84
TOP TIER
Ball State	98
Troy State	70
Ball State	72
8	Texas Southern	97
New Haven State	66
8	Texas Southern	67
5	Portland	77
Austin Peay State	65
5	Portland	70
Tennessee State	87
Tennessee State	87
Adrian	69
TOP TIER
William Jewell	70
Adelphi	69*
William Jewell	67
4	Western Illinois State	80
Southern State	70
4	Western Illinois State	101
3	West Virginia Tech	91
Villa Madonna	93
Villa Madonna	78
Eastern Illinois State	110
Eastern Illinois State	88
New Mexico Highlands	76
BOTTOM TIER
Stevens Point State	93
Millersville State	85
Stevens Point State	69
6	Hamline	81
Wayland Baptist	72
6	Hamline	75
7	Southeastern State	82
Northwest Nazarene	58
7	Southeastern State	98
Southwest Texas State	78
Southwest Texas State	104
Upper Iowa	71
BOTTOM TIER
Emporia State	82
Northern State (SD)	66
Emporia State	74
2	Youngstown	80
Westmont	75
2	Youngstown	81

Elite Eight
1	Pacific Lutheran	91
8	Texas Southern	72
Tennessee State	90
4	Western Illinois State	88
Eastern Illinois State	88
6	Hamline	83
7	Southeastern State	69
2	Youngstown	65

NAIA national semifinals
1	Pacific Lutheran	70
Tennessee State	71
Eastern Illinois State	81
7	Southeastern State	95

NAIA national championship
Tennessee State	92
7	Southeastern State	73
NAIA third-place game
1	Pacific Lutheran	87
Eastern Illinois State	85

- denotes overtime

== See also ==
- 1957 NCAA University Division basketball tournament
- 1957 NCAA College Division basketball tournament
- 1957 National Invitation Tournament
