= List of Portland Pilots men's basketball seasons =

This is a list of seasons completed by the Portland Pilots men's basketball team since 1922–23.

== Seasons ==
Record table
Season	Coach	Overall	Conference	Standing	Postseason
Clipper Smith (Independent) (1922–1925)
1922–23	Clipper Smith	7–9			
1923–24	Clipper Smith	20–7			
1924–25	Clipper Smith	16–2			
Clipper Smith:		43–18 (.705)	– (–)		
Vincent F. Harrington (Independent) (1925–1927)
1925–26	Vincent F. Harrington	5–12			
1926–27	Vincent F. Harrington	8–6			
Vincent F. Harrington:		13–18 (.419)	– (–)		
Gene Murphy (Independent) (1927–1928)
1927–28	Gene Murphy	3–3			
Edmond Fiene (Independent) (1928–1934)
1928–29	Edmond Fiene	12–8			
1929–30	Edmond Fiene	15–7			
1930–31	Edmond Fiene	8–10			
1931–32	Edmond Fiene	21–9			
1932–33	Edmond Fiene	12–6			
1933–34	Edmond Fiene	8–11			
Edmond Fiene:		76–51 (.598)	– (–)		
Edwin Fitzpatrick (Independent) (1934–1942)
1934–35	Edwin Fitzpatrick	9–9			
1935–36	Edwin Fitzpatrick	13–12			
1936–37	Edwin Fitzpatrick	18–8			
1937–38	Edwin Fitzpatrick	8–10			
1938–39	Edwin Fitzpatrick	13–9			
1939–40	Edwin Fitzpatrick	16–4			
1940–41	Edwin Fitzpatrick	15–9			
1941–42	Edwin Fitzpatrick	14–7			
Edwin Fitzpatrick:		106–68 (.609)	– (–)		
Robert L. Mathews (Independent) (1942–1943)
1942–43	Robert L. Mathews	8–8			
no team () (1943–1945)
Len Yandle (Independent) (1945–1946)
1945–46	Len Yandle	10–14			
Mush Torson (Independent) (1946–1954)
1946–47	Mush Torson	13–18			
1947–48	Mush Torson	15–19			
1948–49	Mush Torson	20–10			NAIB Tournament (1st round)
1949–50	Mush Torson	21–12			NAIB Tournament (2nd round)
1950–51	Mush Torson	23–6			NAIB Tournament (1st round)
1951–52	Mush Torson	24–11			NAIB Tournament (semi-finals)
1952–53	Mush Torson	16–14			NAIB Tournament (1st round)
1953–54	Mush Torson	9–19			
Mush Torson:		141–109 (.564)	– (–)		
Art McLarney (Independent) (1954–1955)
1954–55	Art McLarney	9–13			
Mike Tichy (Independent) (1955–1955)
1954–55	Mike Tichy	4–5			
Al Negratti (Independent) (1955–1967)
1955–56	Al Negratti	20–8			
1956–57	Al Negratti	18–12			
1957–58	Al Negratti	18–11			
1958–59	Al Negratti	19–8			NCAA Tournament First Round
1959–60	Al Negratti	11–15			
1960–61	Al Negratti	16–9			
1961–62	Al Negratti	8–18			
1962–63	Al Negratti	8–18			
1963–64	Al Negratti	17–9			
1964–65	Al Negratti	12–13			
1965–66	Al Negratti	6–19			
1966–67	Al Negratti	10–16			
Al Negratti:		163–156 (.511)	– (–)		
Bill Turner (Independent) (1967–1969)
1967–68	Bill Turner	5–21			
1968–69	Bill Turner	3–23			
Bill Turner:		8–46 (.148)	– (–)		
Joe Etzel (Independent) (1969–1970)
1969–70	Joe Etzel	4–22			
Jack Avina (Independent) (1970–1976)
1970–71	Jack Avina	5–21			
1971–72	Jack Avina	10–16			
1972–73	Jack Avina	9–19			
1973–74	Jack Avina	15–11			
1974–75	Jack Avina	13–16			
1975–76	Jack Avina	9–18			
Jack Avina (West Coast Athletic Conference) (1976–1987)
1976–77	Jack Avina	11–15	6–8	5th	
1977–78	Jack Avina	19–8	9–5	3rd	
1978–79	Jack Avina	18–10	5–9	T–6th	
1979–80	Jack Avina	17–11	9–7	T–5th	
1980–81	Jack Avina	17–10	7–7	T–4th	
1981–82	Jack Avina	17–10	9–5	3rd	
1982–83	Jack Avina	10–18	4–8	6th	
1983–84	Jack Avina	11–17	2–10	7th	
1984–85	Jack Avina	14–14	3–9	T–6th	
1985–86	Jack Avina	13–15	4–10	6th	
1986–87	Jack Avina	14–14	6–8	T–4th	
Jack Avina:		222–243 (.477)	64–86 (.427)		
Larry Steele (West Coast Athletic Conference) (1987–1989)
1987–88	Larry Steele	6–22	1–13	8th	
1988–89	Larry Steele	2–26	2–12	T–7th	
Larry Steele (West Coast Conference) (1989–1994)
1989–90	Larry Steele	11–17	7–7	4th	
1990–91	Larry Steele	5–23	3–11	8th	
1991–92	Larry Steele	10–18	3–11	8th	
1992–93	Larry Steele	9–18	3–11	7th	
1993–94	Larry Steele	13–17	6–8	T–5th	
Larry Steele:		56–141 (.284)	25–73 (.255)		
Rob Chavez (West Coast Conference) (1994–2001)
1994–95	Rob Chavez	21–8	10–4	T–2nd	
1995–96	Rob Chavez	19–11	7–7	5th	NCAA First Round
1996–97	Rob Chavez	9–18	4–10	T–6th	
1997–98	Rob Chavez	14–13	7–7	T–4th	
1998–99	Rob Chavez	9–18	3–11	8th	
1999–2000	Rob Chavez	10–18	4–10	6th	
2000–01	Rob Chavez	11–17	4–10	7th	
Rob Chavez:		93–103 (.474)	39–59 (.398)		
Michael Holton (West Coast Conference) (2001–2006)
2001–02	Michael Holton	6–24	2–12	T–7th	
2002–03	Michael Holton	11–17	4–10	T–6th	
2003–04	Michael Holton	11–17	5–9	T–6th	
2004–05	Michael Holton	15–15	4–10	7th	
2005–06	Michael Holton	11–18	5–9	T–6th	
Michael Holton:		54–91 (.372)	20–50 (.286)		
Eric Reveno (West Coast Conference) (2006–2016)
2006–07	Eric Reveno	9–23	4–10	T–7th	
2007–08	Eric Reveno	9–22	3–11	7th	
2008–09	Eric Reveno	19–13	9–5	3rd	CIT First Round
2009–10	Eric Reveno	21–11	10–4	3rd	CIT First Round
2010–11	Eric Reveno	20–12	7–7	5th	CIT First Round
2011–12	Eric Reveno	7–24	3–13	8th	
2012–13	Eric Reveno	11–21	4–12	T–7th	
2013–14	Eric Reveno	15–16	7–11	6th	
2014–15	Eric Reveno	17–16	7–11	T–6th	CIT First Round
2015–16	Eric Reveno	12–20	6–12	T–7th	
Eric Reveno:		140–178 (.440)	60–96 (.385)		
Terry Porter (West Coast Conference) (2016–2021)
2016–17	Terry Porter	11–22	2–16	10th	
2017–18	Terry Porter	10–22	4–14	9th	
2018–19	Terry Porter	7–25	0–16	10th	
2019–20	Terry Porter	9–23	1–15	10th	
2020–21	Terry Porter	6–11	0–8		
Terry Porter:		43–103 (.295)	7–69 (.092)		
Ben Johnson (West Coast Conference) (2021–2021)
2020–21	Ben Johnson	0–4	0–3	10th	
Shantay Legans (West Coast Conference) (2021–present)
2021–22	Shantay Legans	19–15	7–7	6th	TBC quarterfinal
2022–23	Shantay Legans	13–18	5–11	8th	
2023–24	Shantay Legans	12–21	5–11	T–6th	
2024–25	Shantay Legans	12–20	7–11	8th	
2025–26	Shantay Legans	15–19	6–12	T–9th	
2026–27	Shantay Legans	0–0	0–0		
Shantay Legans:		72–94 (.434)	30–52 (.366)		
Total:		1268–1488 (.460)			
National champion Postseason invitational champion Conference regular season champion Conference regular season and conference tournament champion Division regular season champion Division regular season and conference tournament champion Conference tournament champion
