= John Longfellow =

American basketball player and coach

Biographical details
- Born: September 20, 1901; Leesburg, Indiana, U.S.
- Died: November 8, 1977 (aged 76); Elkhart, Indiana, U.S.
- Education: Manchester

Coaching career (HC unless noted)
- 1922–1924: Leesburg HS
- 1924–1928: Nappannee HS
- 1928–1929: Hartford City HS
- 1929–1948: Elkhart HS
- 1948–1954: Indiana State

Head coaching record
- Overall: 122–64 (college)
- Tournaments: 16-3

Accomplishments and honors

Championships
- 1949 Mid-West Tournament; 1950 NAIA State (Indiana) Title; 1950 NAIA National Title; 1951 Pan-American Games Gold Medal; 1952 NAIA Regional Title; 1953 NAIA District 21 Title; 1954 NAIA District 21 Title

Awards
- NAIA Hall of Fame (1960); Indiana Basketball Hall of Fame (1967); Indiana State University Hall of Fame (1984)

John Landis Longfellow (September 20, 1901 – November 8, 1977) was an American basketball coach and player. He is best known as the National Title-winning head men's basketball coach at Indiana State University, as well as leading the USA National Team to a gold medal in the 1951 Pan-Am Games.

Born in Warsaw, Indiana, Longfellow was a notable Indiana high school coach for the Leesburg Blue Blazers, the Nappanee Bulldogs, and the Hartford City Airedales. However, his greatest success came with the Elkhart Blazers. All told, his teams won over 375 games and 24 state tourney titles in 19 years of coaching; two of his best players were the Brothers Patanelli, Matt Patanelli and Joe Patanelli.

He moved to Indiana State University, replacing the legendary John Wooden. In his first season, he led the Sycamores to the NAIA National Tournament in Kansas City, where they finished 4th. In 1950, the Sycamores won the NAIA National Title. Based on their finish, the eligible (those returning for the next season) Sycamores and Coach Longfellow were invited to represent the United States in the 1951 Pan-American Games. Longfellow served as co-head coach and led the American squad to the gold medal, the first of many basketball gold medals in the Pan-American Games for the USA National Team.

While at Indiana State, he coached some of their most successful players: Duane Klueh, Dick Atha, Don McDonald, Sam Richardson, Lenny Rzeszewski, and Bob Royer. He is currently tied (with Glenn M. Curtis in 4th place in career coaching victories; Curtis does lead in winning percentage (73.1% to 65.6%). Stress-related heart problems led to his retirement from coaching early in the 1954–55 season; he remained as the Athletic Director until he retired from the university in 1959.

He was inducted into the NAIA Hall of Fame in 1960; the Indiana Basketball Hall of Fame in 1967; the Indiana State University Athletic Hall of Fame in 1984. In 2000, his 1949-50 NAIA National Title Team was inducted into the Indiana State University Hall of Fame.

== Head coaching record ==
Record table
Season	Team	Overall	Conference	Standing	Postseason
Indiana State Sycamores (Indiana Intercollegiate Conference) (1948–1950)
1948–49	Indiana State	24–8	7–1	1st	NAIA National Semifinals
1949–50	Indiana State	27–8	7–2	1st	NAIA Champions
Indiana State Sycamores (Indiana Collegiate Conference) (1950–1954)
1950–51	Indiana State	15–10	8–4	1st	
1951–52	Indiana State	19–10	7–5	2nd	NAIA Second Round
1952–53	Indiana State	23–8	8–4	2nd	NAIA Semifinals
1953–54	Indiana State	12–15	5–7		NAIA First Round
1954–55	Indiana State	2–5	1–1		
Indiana State:		122–64 (.656)	43–24 (.642)		
Total:		122–64 (.656)			
National champion Postseason invitational champion Conference regular season champion Conference regular season and conference tournament champion Division regular season champion Division regular season and conference tournament champion Conference tournament champion
