= NAIA men's basketball championship =

College basketball tournament

- Current season, competition or edition: 2026 NAIA men's basketball tournament
- Formerly: National college basketball tournament (1937–1981)
- Sport: College basketball
- Founded: 1937; 89 years ago
- Founder: James Naismith
- Motto: Passion. Tradition. History.
- Divisions: 1; 2 (1992–2020)
- No. of teams: 64 (2022–present); 32 (1992–2020); 48 (2021)
- Venues: Municipal Auditorium (1937–1974, 2002–present); Kemper Arena (1975–1993); Mabee Center (1994–1998); Reynolds Center (1999); Tulsa Convention Center (2000–2001); Montgomery Fieldhouse (1992–1998); Idaho Center (1998–1999); Keeter Gymnasium (2000–2017); Sanford Pentagon (2018–2020)
- Most recent champion: Freed–Hardeman (2nd)
- Most titles: D-I: Oklahoma City (6); D-II: Bethel (IN), Cornerstone, Indiana Wesleyan, and Oregon Tech (3 each)
- Broadcasters: CBS College Sports Network (national); ESPN 3 (national); TWC Sports Channel (Kansas City area); Victory Sports Network (national)
- Related competitions: NAIA women's basketball championship
- Website: naia.org/sports/mbkb

The NAIA men's basketball national championship has been held annually by the National Association of Intercollegiate Athletics since 1937 to determine the national champion of men's college basketball among its members in the United States and Canada.

The tournament was established by James Naismith to crown a national champion for smaller colleges and universities and has been held every year since, with the exceptions of 1944 (due to World War II) and 2020 (due to the COVID-19 pandemic).

Since 2022, the tournament has featured 64 teams, with teams beginning play at one of sixteen regional sites with the winners of those regionals playing at the final venue.

From 1992 to 2020, the NAIA sponsored two championships, one for its Division I members and another for those in its Division II. The Division I tournament was played in Kansas City, Missouri while the Division II tournament moved locations several times (it finished, in 2020, at the Sanford Pentagon in Sioux Falls, South Dakota). During this time, the NAIA tournaments featured 32 teams with the entire events contested at one location in one week (rather than multiple locations over a series of weekends).

After the 2020 tournaments were cancelled, however, they were merged back into a single tournament, which initially featured 48 teams in 2021 before expanding to 64 teams in 2022.

All tournament games can be watched online through the official NAIA provider StretchInternet.

Freed–Hardeman are the reigning national champions, winning their second NAIA national title in 2026.

== History ==
The Men's Basketball Championship is mostly played at the Municipal Auditorium in Kansas City, Missouri. It has been held in Kansas City every year since the tournament began except from 1994 to 2001, when it was played in Tulsa, Oklahoma, and in 2020, when no tournament was held. Kansas City will continue to host until at least 2024.

In 2018, the NAIA announced a new format for the 2021 tournament after the merger of D-I and D-II. Under the new format, the men's and women's tournaments each involve 64 teams (the first post-COVID tournaments in 2021 had 48 teams). The first two rounds are played at 16 separate sites, with only the 16 winners at these sites advancing to Kansas City.

The tournament MVP has been presented with the Chuck Taylor Most Valuable Player award since 1939. In 1948, the NAIA became the first national organization to open their intercollegiate postseason to black student-athletes due primarily to the media attention surrounding the Manhattan Jaspers. Manhattan, who had an all-white team, learned of the NAIA rule that prohibited blacks from participating in the tournament, and after asking the NAIA to rescind the rule, the NAIA refused and Manhattan withdrew from the tournament. "The battle might have ended there but for a man named Harry Henshel, who was a member of the U.S. Olympic basketball committee. One of the reasons that the NAIA tournament was so prestigious was that the champion was invited to compete at the Olympic trials in New York City in late March. (The other teams invited were the two NCAA finalists, three teams from the Amateur Athletic Union, the winner of the National Invitation Tournament, and a YMCA team.)" After reading in the New York papers that blacks could not participate in the tournament, Henshel suggested to the media that the NAIA national champion be eliminated from Olympic consideration. NAIA officials read Hershel’s statement in the papers and quickly took a telegraphic poll amongst its members the following day that rescinded the racial ban. In 1947, Coach John Wooden of Indiana State refused the invitation to the NAIA National Tournament primarily because Clarence J. Walker, the only black player on his team could not participate. Because of the stance taken by Manhattan and Harry Hansel, in 1948, Coach Wooden was able to take Walker to the tournament who became the first African-American student-athlete to play in the NAIA tournament. Walker, a vital role player, helped the Sycamores finish as the NAIA's national finalist. In 1957, Tennessee State became the first historically black college to win a national championship, and the first team to win three consecutive tournaments. As of 2017, Kentucky State is the only other school to do so (1970, 1971, 1972). Oklahoma City holds the record for the most tournament championships with six. OCU also holds the record for most national championship titles in NAIA women's basketball.

== Results ==
- From 1937 to 1991, it was a single division
- From 1992, it became the "Division I", returning to a single division in 2021.

NAIA Basketball Championship
Edition	Year	Location	Arena	Championship			Third-place game		
Edition	Year	Location	Arena	Champion	Score	Runner-up	Third place	Score	Fourth place
1	1937	Kansas City, MO	Municipal Auditorium	Central Missouri State	35–24 (Note: Lowest scoring game.)	Morningside	Southwestern (KS)	46–38	Arkansas State Teachers
2	1938	Kansas City, MO	Municipal Auditorium	Central Missouri State	45–30	Roanoke	Murray State	33–24	Washburn
3	1939	Kansas City, MO	Municipal Auditorium	Southwestern (KS)	32–31	San Diego State	Glenville State	42–26	Peru State
4	1940	Kansas City, MO	Municipal Auditorium	Tarkio	52–31	San Diego State	Delta State	45–26	Hamline
5	1941	Kansas City, MO	Municipal Auditorium	San Diego State	36–32	Murray State	West Texas State	43–35	Santa Barbara State
6	1942	Kansas City, MO	Municipal Auditorium	Hamline	33–31	Southeastern State (OK)	Pittsburg State	58–47	Central Missouri State
7	1943	Kansas City, MO	Municipal Auditorium	Southeast Missouri State	34–32	Northwest Missouri State	North Texas State	59–55 ^{OT}	Murray State
–	1944	(No Tournament held)							
8	1945	Kansas City, MO	Municipal Auditorium	Loyola New Orleans	49–36	Pepperdine	Eastern Kentucky State	56–49	Southern Illinois Normal
9	1946	Kansas City, MO	Municipal Auditorium	Southern Illinois Normal	49–40	Indiana State	Pepperdine	82–55	Loyola New Orleans
10	1947	Kansas City, MO	Municipal Auditorium	Marshall	73–59	Mankato State	Arizona State–Flagstaff	47–38	Emporia State
11	1948	Kansas City, MO	Municipal Auditorium	Louisville	82–70	Indiana State	Hamline	59–58	Xavier (OH)
12	1949	Kansas City, MO	Municipal Auditorium	Hamline	57–46	Regis	Beloit	67–59	Indiana State
13	1950	Kansas City, MO	Municipal Auditorium	Indiana State	61–47	East Central State (OK)	Central Methodist	80–67	Tampa
14	1951	Kansas City, MO	Municipal Auditorium	Hamline	69–61	Millikin	Baldwin–Wallace	82–76	Regis
15	1952	Kansas City, MO	Municipal Auditorium	Southwest Missouri State	73–64	Murray State	Southwest Texas State	78–68	Portland
16	1953	Kansas City, MO	Municipal Auditorium	Southwest Missouri State	79–71	Hamline	Indiana State	74–71	East Texas State
17	1954	Kansas City, MO	Municipal Auditorium	St. Benedict's (KS)	62–56	Western Illinois State	Southwest Missouri State	75–61	Arkansas Tech
18	1955	Kansas City, MO	Municipal Auditorium	East Texas State	71–54	Southeastern Oklahoma State	Western Illinois State	77–74	Arkansas Tech
19	1956	Kansas City, MO	Municipal Auditorium	McNeese State	60–55	Texas Southern	Pittsburg State	77–70	Wheaton (IL)
20	1957	Kansas City, MO	Municipal Auditorium	Tennessee A&I	92–73	Southeastern State (OK)	Pacific Lutheran	87–85	Eastern Illinois State
21	1958	Kansas City, MO	Municipal Auditorium	Tennessee A&I	85–73	Western Illinois	Texas Southern	121–109	Georgetown (KY)
22	1959	Kansas City, MO	Municipal Auditorium	Tennessee A&I	97–87	Pacific Lutheran	Southwest Texas State	87–80	Fort Hays State
23	1960	Kansas City, MO	Municipal Auditorium	Southwest Texas State	66–44	Westminster (PA)	Tennessee A&M	100–65	William Jewell
24	1961	Kansas City, MO	Municipal Auditorium	Grambling	95–75	Georgetown (KY)	Northern Michigan	101–84	Westminster (PA)
25	1962	Kansas City, MO	Municipal Auditorium	Prairie View A&M	62–53	Westminster (PA)	Southeastern State (OK)	76–62	Western Illinois
26	1963	Kansas City, MO	Municipal Auditorium	Pan American	73–62	Western Carolina	Grambling	107–86	Fort Hays State
27	1964	Kansas City, MO	Municipal Auditorium	Rockhurst	66–56	Pan American	Carson–Newman	73–60	Kansas State Teachers
28	1965	Kansas City, MO	Municipal Auditorium	Central State (OH)	85–51	Oklahoma Baptist	Ouachita Baptist	78–71	Fairmont State
29	1966	Kansas City, MO	Municipal Auditorium	Oklahoma Baptist	88–59	Georgia Southern	Grambling	110–110	Virginia State–Norfolk
30	1967	Kansas City, MO	Municipal Auditorium	St. Benedict's (KS)	71–65	Oklahoma Baptist	Central Washington State	106–92	Morris Harvey
31	1968	Kansas City, MO	Municipal Auditorium	Central State (OH)	51–48	Fairmont State	Oshkosh State	102–68	Westminster (PA)
32	1969	Kansas City, MO	Municipal Auditorium	Eastern New Mexico	99–76	Maryland State	Central Washington State	96–82	Elizabeth City State
33	1970	Kansas City, MO	Municipal Auditorium	Kentucky State	79–71	Central Washington State	Eastern New Mexico	77–72 ^{OT}	Guilford
34	1971	Kansas City, MO	Municipal Auditorium	Kentucky State	102–82	Eastern Michigan	Elizabeth City State	88–87 ^{OT}	Fairmont State
35	1972	Kansas City, MO	Municipal Auditorium	Kentucky State	71–62	Wisconsin–Eau Claire	Stephen F. Austin	94–91	Gardner–Webb
36	1973	Kansas City, MO	Municipal Auditorium	Guilford	99–96	Maryland–Eastern Shore	Augustana (IL)	96–93	Slippery Rock State
37	1974	Kansas City, MO	Municipal Auditorium	West Georgia	97–79	Alcorn State	Kentucky State	95–79	St. Mary's (TX)
38	1975	Kansas City, MO	Kemper Arena	Grand Canyon	65–54	Midwestern	Alcorn State	76–74	St. Mary's (TX)
39	1976	Kansas City, MO	Kemper Arena	Coppin State	96–91	Henderson State	Marymount (KS)	78–75	Lincoln Memorial
40	1977	Kansas City, MO	Kemper Arena	Texas Southern	71–44	Campbell	Henderson State	96–73	Grand Valley State
41	1978	Kansas City, MO	Kemper Arena	Grand Canyon	79–75	Kearney State	Quincy	87–73	East Texas State
42	1979	Kansas City, MO	Kemper Arena	Drury	60–54	Henderson State	Southwest Texas State	101–88	Midwestern State
43	1980	Kansas City, MO	Kemper Arena	Cameron	84–77	Alabama State	Huron	59–54	Wisconsin–Eau Claire
44	1981	Kansas City, MO	Kemper Arena	Bethany Nazarene	86–85 ^{OT}	Alabama-Huntsville	Wisconsin–Eau Claire	90–60	Hillsdale
45	1982	Kansas City, MO	Kemper Arena	South Carolina–Spartanburg	51–38	Biola	Hampton	98–94	Kearney State
46	1983	Kansas City, MO	Kemper Arena	College of Charleston	57–53	West Virginia Wesleyan	Fort Hays State	85–76	Chaminade
47	1984	Kansas City, MO	Kemper Arena	Fort Hays State	48–46 ^{OT}	Wisconsin–Stevens Point	Chicago State	86–82 ^{OT}	Westmont
48	1985	Kansas City, MO	Kemper Arena	Fort Hays State	82–80 ^{OT}	Wayland Baptist	Marycrest	108–94	Central Washington State
49	1986	Kansas City, MO	Kemper Arena	David Lipscomb	67–54	Arkansas-Monticello	Southeastern Oklahoma State	75–74	St. Thomas Aquinas
50	1987	Kansas City, MO	Kemper Arena	Washburn	79–77	West Virginia State	Central Washington State	76–69	Georgetown (KY)
51	1988	Kansas City, MO	Kemper Arena	Grand Canyon	88–86 ^{OT}	Auburn Montgomery	College of Charleston	89–61	Waynesburg
52	1989	Kansas City, MO	Kemper Arena	St. Mary's (TX)	61–58	East Central	Central Washington State & Wisconsin–Eau Claire		
53	1990	Kansas City, MO	Kemper Arena	Birmingham–Southern	88–80	Wisconsin–Eau Claire	David Lipscomb & Georgetown (KY)		
54	1991	Kansas City, MO	Kemper Arena	Oklahoma City	77–74	Central Arkansas	Pfeiffer & Taylor		
55	1992	Kansas City, MO	Kemper Arena	Oklahoma City	82–73 ^{OT}	Central Arkansas	BYU Hawaii & Pfeiffer		
56	1993	Kansas City, MO	Kemper Arena	Hawaii Pacific	88–83	Oklahoma Baptist	Georgetown (KY) & Midwestern State		
57	1994	Tulsa, OK	Mabee Center	Oklahoma City	99–81	Life	Midwestern State & Oklahoma Baptist		
58	1995	Tulsa, OK	Mabee Center	Birmingham–Southern	92–76	Pfeiffer	Arkansas Tech & Belmont		
59	1996	Tulsa, OK	Mabee Center	Oklahoma City	86–80	Georgetown (KY)	Belmont & Lipscomb		
60	1997	Tulsa, OK	Mabee Center	Life	73–64	Oklahoma Baptist	Cumberland (KY) & Point Park		
61	1998	Tulsa, OK	Mabee Center	Georgetown (KY)	83–69	Southern Nazarene	Azusa Pacific & Park (MO)		
62	1999	Tulsa, OK	Donald W. Reynolds Center	Life	63–60	Mobile	Azusa Pacific & Westmont		
63	2000	Tulsa, OK	Tulsa Convention Center	Life	61–59	Georgetown (KY)	Biola & Olivet Nazarene		
64	2001	Tulsa, OK	Tulsa Convention Center	Faulkner	63–59	USAO	Christian Heritage College & Pikeville		
65	2002	Kansas City, MO	Municipal Auditorium	USAO	96–79	Oklahoma Baptist	Azusa Pacific & Barat		
66	2003	Kansas City, MO	Municipal Auditorium	Concordia–Irvine	88–84 ^{OT}	Mountain State	Georgetown (KY) & McKendree		
67	2004	Kansas City, MO	Municipal Auditorium	Mountain State	74–70	Concordia Irvine	Georgetown (KY) & Mobile		
68	2005	Kansas City, MO	Municipal Auditorium	John Brown	65–55	Azusa Pacific	Carroll (MT) & Robert Morris (IL)		
69	2006	Kansas City, MO	Municipal Auditorium	Texas Wesleyan	67–65	Oklahoma City	Oklahoma Baptist & Robert Morris (IL)		
70	2007	Kansas City, MO	Municipal Auditorium	Oklahoma City	79–71	Concordia–Irvine	Faulkner & Robert Morris (IL)		
71	2008	Kansas City, MO	Municipal Auditorium	Oklahoma City	75–72	Mountain State	Campbellsville & Georgetown (KY)		
72	2009	Kansas City, MO	Municipal Auditorium	Rocky Mountain	77–61	Columbia (MO)	MidAmerica Nazarene & Robert Morris (IL)		
73	2010	Kansas City, MO	Municipal Auditorium	Oklahoma Baptist	84–83	Azusa Pacific	Robert Morris (IL) & Southern Polytechnic State		
74	2011	Kansas City, MO	Municipal Auditorium	Pikeville	83–76 ^{OT}	Mountain State	Georgetown (KY) & Martin Methodist		
75	2012	Kansas City, MO	Municipal Auditorium	Concordia–Irvine	72–69	Oklahoma Baptist	Mountain State & Shorter		
76	2013	Kansas City, MO	Municipal Auditorium	Georgetown (KY)	88–62	Southwestern Assemblies of God	Lindsey Wilson & LSU Shreveport		
77	2014	Kansas City, MO	Municipal Auditorium	Vanguard	70–65	Emmanuel (GA)	MidAmerica Nazarene & St. Gregory's		
78	2015	Kansas City, MO	Municipal Auditorium	Dalton State	71–53	Westmont	Hope International & Talladega		
79	2016	Kansas City, MO	Municipal Auditorium	Mid-America Christian	100–99 ^{OT} (Note: Highest scoring game.)	Georgetown (KY)	Campbellsville & MidAmerica Nazarene		
80	2017	Kansas City, MO	Municipal Auditorium	Texas Wesleyan	86–76	Life	LSU Alexandria & William Penn		
81	2018	Kansas City, MO	Municipal Auditorium	Graceland	83–80 ^{OT}	LSU Alexandria	LSU Shreveport & William Penn		
82	2019	Kansas City, MO	Municipal Auditorium	Georgetown (KY)	68–48	Carroll (MT)	William Carey & Lewis–Clark State		
–	2020	(No tournament due to the COVID-19 pandemic)							
83	2021 (Note: New tournament format.)	Kansas City, MO	Municipal Auditorium	Shawnee State	74–68	Lewis–Clark State	SAGU & Saint Francis (IN)		
84	2022	Kansas City, MO	Municipal Auditorium	Loyola New Orleans	71–56	Talladega	Thomas More & Arizona Christian		
85	2023	Kansas City, MO	Municipal Auditorium	College of Idaho	73–71	Indiana Tech	Ottawa (AZ) & Georgetown (KY)		
86	2024	Kansas City, MO	Municipal Auditorium	Freed–Hardeman	71–67	Langston	Grace & College of Idaho		
87	2025	Kansas City, MO	Municipal Auditorium	College of Idaho (2)	93–65	Oklahoma Wesleyan	Arizona Christian & Freed–Hardeman		
88	2026	Kansas City, MO	Municipal Auditorium	Freed–Hardeman (2)	76–71	Langston	Ave Maria & Benedictine Mesa		

== Champions ==
- Division II titles are not included in this list.
National championships among active programs: 6, 3, 2, 1

=== Active NAIA programs ===
Team	Titles	Years
Oklahoma City	6	1991, 1992, 1994, 1996, 2007, 2008
Life	3	1997, 1999, 2000
Georgetown (KY)	3	1998, 2013, 2019
Benedictine	2	1954, 1967
Freed–Hardeman	2	2024, 2026
Loyola New Orleans	2	1945, 2022
College of Idaho	2	2023, 2025
Texas Wesleyan	2	2006, 2017
Shawnee State	1	2021
Graceland	1	2018
Mid-America Christian	1	2016
Dalton State	1	2015
Pikeville	1	2011
Rocky Mountain	1	2009
John Brown	1	2005
USAO	1	2002
Faulkner	1	2001
Southwestern (KS)	1	1939

=== Former NAIA programs ===
Team	Titles	Years
Hamline	3	1942, 1949, 1951
Tennessee State	3	1957, 1958, 1959
Kentucky State	3	1970, 1971, 1972
Grand Canyon	3	1975, 1978, 1988
Concordia Irvine	2	2003, 2012
Oklahoma Baptist	2	1966, 2010
Birmingham–Southern	2	1990, 1995
Fort Hays State	2	1984, 1985
Central State (OH)	2	1965, 1968
Missouri State	2	1952, 1953
Central Missouri	2	1937, 1938
Vanguard	1	2014
Mountain State	1	2004
Hawaii Pacific	1	1993
St. Mary's (TX)	1	1989
Washburn	1	1987
Lipscomb	1	1986
College of Charleston	1	1983
USC Upstate	1	1982
Southern Nazarene	1	1981
Cameron	1	1980
Drury	1	1979
Texas Southern	1	1977
Coppin State	1	1976
West Georgia	1	1974
Guilford	1	1973
Eastern New Mexico	1	1969
Rockhurst	1	1964
UT Rio Grande Valley (Note: Pan American, later known as UT Pan American, ceased to exist in 2015, when the merger of UTPA with UT Brownsville took full effect. All history and records of the UTPA athletic program were transferred to the successor institution, UT Rio Grande Valley.)	1	1963
Prairie View A&M	1	1962
Grambling State	1	1961
Texas State	1	1960
McNeese	1	1956
East Texas A&M	1	1955
Indiana State	1	1950
Louisville	1	1948
Marshall	1	1947
Southern Illinois	1	1946
Southeast Missouri State	1	1943
San Diego State	1	1941
Tarkio	1	1940

== See also ==
- Chuck Taylor Most Valuable Player Award
- NAIA Division II men's basketball championship (1992–2020)
- NAIA women's basketball championship
- NAIA Division II women's basketball championship (1992–2020)
- NCAA Division I men's basketball tournament
- NCAA Division II men's basketball tournament
- NCAA Division III men's basketball tournament
