= 1948–49 Indiana State Sycamores men's basketball team =

American college basketball season

1948–49 Indiana State Sycamores men's basketball

Indiana Intercollegiate Conference champions

NAIA Men's Division I Tournament, Semi-Finalist
- Conference: Indiana Intercollegiate Conference
- Record: 24–8 (8–0 IIC)
- Head coach: John Longfellow
- Home arena: Indiana State Teacher's College Gymnasium

In the 1948–49 Indiana State Sycamores men's basketball season, the Sycamores were led by coach John Longfellow, NAIB All-American Duane Klueh and future NBA players, John Hazen and Bob Royer. They lost to Regis (CO) in 2OT in the NAIA National Semi-finals. The Sycamores finished as the National 4th place team with record of 24–8. This season represented Indiana State's 3rd NAIA Final Four.

== Regular season ==
During the 1948–49 season, Indiana State finished the regular season to finish 21–6, 7–0 in the Indiana Intercollegiate Conference; they won by an average of 16 points per game, scoring over 2,000 points. They finished the season at 24–8; the second highest win total in school history (at that time).

Coach John Longfellow's first team raced out of the gate, winning 9 of their first 12 games; including the mid-season Mid-Western Tournament over Oklahoma City Univ, Delta State (Miss) and Northeast Missouri. They won their 3rd consecutive Indiana Intercollegiate Conference title, qualifying for the NAIA Tournament.

Reserved seats were $1.20 per game for adults; ($11.75 in 2013 prices). Children were admitted for 60 cents! In 2013–14, many reserved seats for Indiana State games are available for $10.00.

== Post-season ==
In 1949, Longfellow's first basketball team won the Indiana Intercollegiate Conference title and received an invitation to the National Association of Intercollegiate Basketball (NAIB) National Tournament in Kansas City. Playing for his third season was Clarence Walker, an African-American from East Chicago, Indiana., who integrated the NAIA tournament the season prior under John Wooden. That year, Walker became the first African-American to play in any post-season intercollegiate basketball tournament, as the NIT and NCAA tournaments did not integrate until after 1950.

In Kansas City they won their first three games, winning their third game on a long Lenny Rzeszewski field goal with 3 seconds remaining in the game. but dropped a stunning double-overtime game to Regis, the surprise team of the tourney. The next day, in a re-match, following a December game, Beloit (WI) beat an exhausted Indiana State team to claim National 3rd place honors. Lenny Rzeszewski was named to the NAIB All-American and All-Tournament teams, joining him on both teams was Bob Royer, who was made his 3rd All-Tournament team.

== Roster ==
The Sycamores were led by All-American Lenny Rzeszewski, Duane Klueh averaged 15.6 ppg, Don McDonald had a 10.5 average and Bob Royer posted an 11.5 ppg average. The starting lineup featured four future 1,000 career point scorers; Klueh, Don McDonald, the 1950 Chuck Taylor Award-winner Lenny Rzeszewski, and Bob Royer. The roster also included future Indiana Basketball Hall of Famer, Jim Powers, who became high school coach to actor Michael Warren.

SENIORS

- #72 Bob Brady – Forward (South Bend, Indiana)
- #54 Duane Klueh – Guard (Terre Haute, Indiana)
- #7_ Dave Pressler –
- #34 Bob Royer – Guard (Bowling Green, Indiana)
- #73 Max Woolsey – Guard (Linton, Indiana)

JUNIORS

- #77 Jim Berger – Guard (Jasper, Indiana)
- #57 Dan Dimich – Forward/Center (South Bend, Indiana)
- #45 Gene Edmonds – Center
- #52 John Hazen – Forward
- #92 Buren Hooper – (Bruceville, Indiana)
- #33 Bill Jagodzinski – (South Bend, Indiana)
- #75 Jerry Kunkel – Guard (Jasper, Indiana)
- #69 Len Rzeszewski – Guard (South Bend, Indiana)
- #56 Don McDonald – Center (Fontanet, Indiana)
- #55 Jim Powers – Forward (South Bend, Indiana)
- #32 Clarence Walker – Guard (East Chicago, Indiana)

SOPHOMORES

- #59 Floyd Foster –

COACHES

- Head Coach John Longfellow – Future NAIA Champion and Hall of Fame Coach

== NAIA basketball tournament ==
- Kansas City Nationals
  - Indiana State 60, Eastern New Mexico 42
  - Indiana State 78, Loyola (MD) 58
- Elite Eight
  - Indiana State 67, Emporia State (KS) 66
  - Indiana State 45, Regis (CO) 48 (2OT)
- 3rd Place Game
  - Indiana State 59 Beloit (WI) 67

== Awards and honors ==
Len Rzeszewski – All-American (NAIB); All-NAIB Tourney
Bob Royer – All-American (NAIB); All-NAIB Tourney
