= 1945–46 Portland Pilots men's basketball team =

American college basketball season

1945–46 Portland Pilots men's basketball
- Record: 10–14 (n/a )
- Head coach: Len Yandle (1st season)
- Home arena: Howard Hall

The 1945–46 Portland Pilots men's basketball team represented the University of Portland during the 1945-46 NAIA men's basketball season. The Pilots, led by first-year head coach Len Yandle, played their home games at Howard Hall.

The 1945–46 season marked the resumption of men's basketball by the University of Portland after having been discontinued in 1943 because of World War II.

The Pilots went 10-14 in all games and 9-9 in inter-collegiate play. One week after the end of the season, the University of Portland announced that Yandle's contract would not be renewed, and that Mush Torson would be his replacement as head coach.

== Roster ==
1945–46 Portland Pilots men's basketball team
Players
Coaches

Pos.	#	Name	Height	Weight	Year	Previous school	Hometown
G		Jim Albers	—	—	Fr	Grant HS	Portland, Oregon
F		Pinky Albers	—	—	Fr	?	?
G		Arnold Borho	5 ft 9 in (1.75 m)	—	Fr	?	Nekoma, North Dakota
C		Chuck Daly	6 ft 3 in (1.91 m)	—		?	?
F		Bob Gardner	6 ft 0 in (1.83 m)	185 lb (84 kg)		?	Castle Rock, Washington
C		Jack Goetze	6 ft 3 in (1.91 m)	180 lb (82 kg)		Jefferson HS	Portland, Oregon
G	11	Danny Harrington	—	160 lb (73 kg)	Fr	Columbia Prep	Portland, Oregon
F		Don Hawe	—	—		?	?
F		Don Kelly	—	—		?	?
G		Hugh Lacey	—	—		?	?
C		Bill Leary	—	—	So	?	?
F		Dave Lebenzon	—	—		Lincoln HS	Portland, Oregon
G		Jim Manion	5 ft 11 in (1.8 m)	—		?	Anaconda, Montana
G	7	Dick Meechan	—	145 lb (66 kg)	Fr	?	Payette, Idaho
G	13	Don Nelson	5 ft 10 in (1.78 m)	155 lb (70 kg)		?	Springs, Colorado
G		John L. Sullivan	—	—		St. Helens HS	St. Helens, Oregon
G		Rudy Vuksich	—	—		Benson Tech HS	Portland, Oregon

Head coach

- Len Yandle (Southern Oregon Normal School)

Assistant coach(es)

Legend

- (C) Team captain
- (S) Suspended
- (I) Ineligible
- (W) Walk-on
- Injured
- Current redshirt

== Schedule and results ==
Date time, TV	Rank^{#}	Opponent^{#}	Result	Record	Site city, state
Pre-season
December 8, 1945		Oregon	L 30–49	0–1	Howard Hall; Portland, OR
December 12, 1945		Camp Adair	L 37–44	0–2	? Corvallis, OR
December 15, 1945		Willamette	W 47–30	1–2	Howard Hall; Portland, OR
December 20, 1945		Pacific	W 46–35	2–2	Howard Hall; Portland, OR
December 27, 1945		Farragut Naval Center	L 38–45	2–3	? Farragut, ID
December 28, 1945		Washington State	L 49–72	2–4	Bohler Gymnasium; Pullman, WA
January 7, 1946		Camp Adair	L 31–32	2–5	Howard Hall; Portland, OR
Regular season
January 9, 1946		Willamette	L 49–57	2–6	Willamette Gymnasium; Salem, OR
January 15, 1946		Pacific	W 51–37	3–6	? Forest Grove, OR
January 19, 1946		Lewis & Clark	W 71–21	4–6	Collins View gymnasium Portland, OR
January 21, 1946		College of Idaho	W 73–27	5–6	Howard Hall; Portland, OR
January 22, 1946		College of Idaho	W 49–30	6–6	Howard Hall; Portland, OR
January 26, 1946		Linfield	L 50–60	6–7	Howard Hall; Portland, OR
January 30, 1946		Pacific	W 45–37	7–7	? Forest Grove, OR
February 1, 1946		British Columbia	L 46–70	7–8	Howard Hall; Portland, OR
February 2, 1946		British Columbia	L 38–52	7–9	Howard Hall; Portland, OR
February 8, 1946		British Columbia	L 38–82	7–10	? Vancouver, BC
February 9, 1946		British Columbia	L 46–72	7–11	? Vancouver, BC
February 13, 1946		Olympia Elks	L 41–61	7–12	? Olympia, WA
February 16, 1946		Portland Police	W 53–43	8–12	Howard Hall; Portland, OR
February 19, 1946		Lewis & Clark	W 51–31	9–12	? Portland, OR
February 20, 1946		Linfield	W 59–56	10–12	Riley Gymnasium; McMinnville, OR
February 21, 1946		Northwest Insulators	L 37–59	10–13	Howard Hall; Portland, OR
February 23, 1946		Pacific	L 62–66	10–14	Howard Hall; Portland, OR
*Non-conference game. ^{#}Rankings from AP Poll. (#) Tournament seedings in parentheses.
