= Angelo State Rams and Rambelles =

Intercollegiate sports teams of Angelo State University

- University: Angelo State University
- Conference: LSC (primary)
- NCAA: Division II
- Athletic director: James Reid
- Location: San Angelo, Texas
- Varsity teams: 13 (5 men's, 8 women's)
- Football stadium: LeGrand Stadium at 1st Community Credit Union Field
- Basketball arena: Junell Center-Stephens Arena
- Baseball stadium: Foster Field at 1st Community Credit Union Stadium
- Softball stadium: Mayer Field
- Soccer stadium: ASU Soccer Field
- Tennis venue: ASU Tennis Complex
- Mascot: Roscoe and Bella, Dominic is a live mascot
- Nickname: Rams
- Website: angelosports.com

Team NCAA championships
- 3

The Angelo State Rams and Rambelles, also known as ASU Rams and Rambelles, are the athletic teams that represent Angelo State University, located in San Angelo, Texas, in intercollegiate sports at the Division II level of the National Collegiate Athletic Association (NCAA), primarily competing in the Lone Star Conference (LSC) since the 1968–69 academic year. Prior to becoming a four-year institution, Angelo State previously competed in the National Junior College Athletic Association (NJCAA) until after the 1963–64 academic year. The men's teams are the Rams and the women's teams are the Rambelles.

Angelo State competes in 13 intercollegiate varsity sports: Men's sports include baseball, basketball, cross country, football and track & field; while women's sports include basketball, cross country, golf, soccer, softball, soccer, tennis, track & field and volleyball.

== Sports sponsored ==
Men's sports	Women's sports
Baseball	Basketball
Basketball	Cross country
Cross country	Golf
Football	Softball
Track and field^{1}	Soccer
	Tennis
	Track and field^{1}
	Volleyball
^{1} – Track and field includes both indoor and outdoor

== Programs ==
=== Baseball ===
The Rams Baseball team plays at Foster Field. Built in 1999 The $4.5m field features 4,200 permanent seats making it the largest on campus Baseball stadium in NCAA Division II. It also includes a Triple-A lighting system and an 82-foot (25 m) wide, 21 feet (6.4 m) high LED scoreboard complete with a high-definition video screen, making it also the largest in Division II. The on campus field was shared with the local minor league San Angelo Colts.

=== Basketball ===
The Rams' and Rambelles' basketball teams, as well as the Rambelles' volleyball team, play at Stephens Arena located inside the Junell Center. The arena accommodates audiences of up to 6,500, the fourth largest in all NCAA Division II athletics, and features a 9x12 foot video screen, the largest of its kind in the Lone Star Conference.

=== Football ===
The Rams football team plays its home games at LeGrand Stadium at 1st Community Credit Union Field located behind the Junell Center. The rams football team moved there starting with the 2014 season and play their home games on campus for the first time in the school's history.

=== Softball ===
The Rambelles softball field, Mayer Field, was completed in 2001. The field features two dugout facilities that include team bathrooms and washrooms, team benches, bag and bat storage areas. The field also includes a pressbox overlooking home plate with seating for six, a concession stand as well as a complete sound and public address system and a deluxe inning-by-inning scoreboard and a mini-athletic training facility with an area for pre-game preparation and injury treatment at the field. The softball field was updated in 2015 adding more seating.

=== Track & field ===
The Rams track and field team compete at the LeGrand Sports Complex. The complex features a 400-meter all-weather track with 200-meter straightaway, throwing areas, full press box facilities and seating for 3,000 people. The facility has been the site for the 1988, 1991, 1992, 2002 and 2009 NCAA Division II Outdoor Track and Field Championships.

== Facilities ==
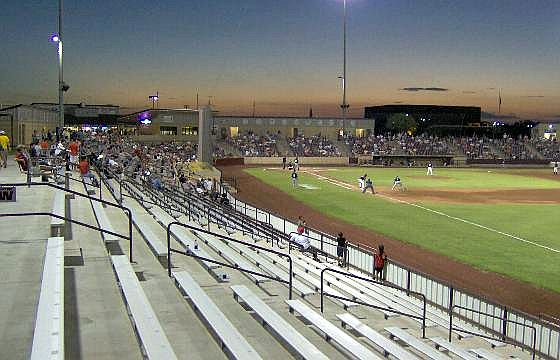
Foster Field, baseball venue

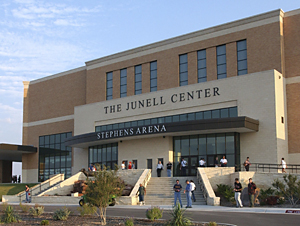
Junell Center

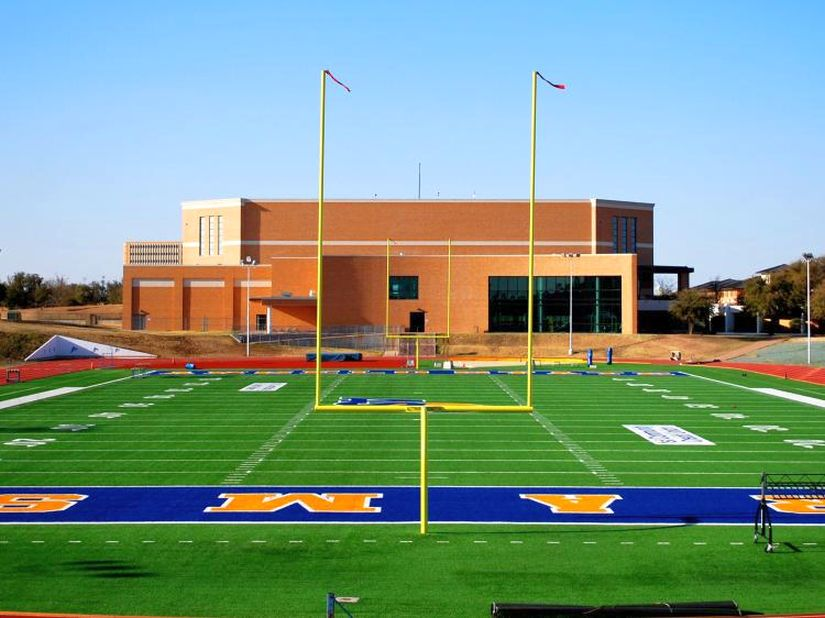
LeGrand Football Stadium

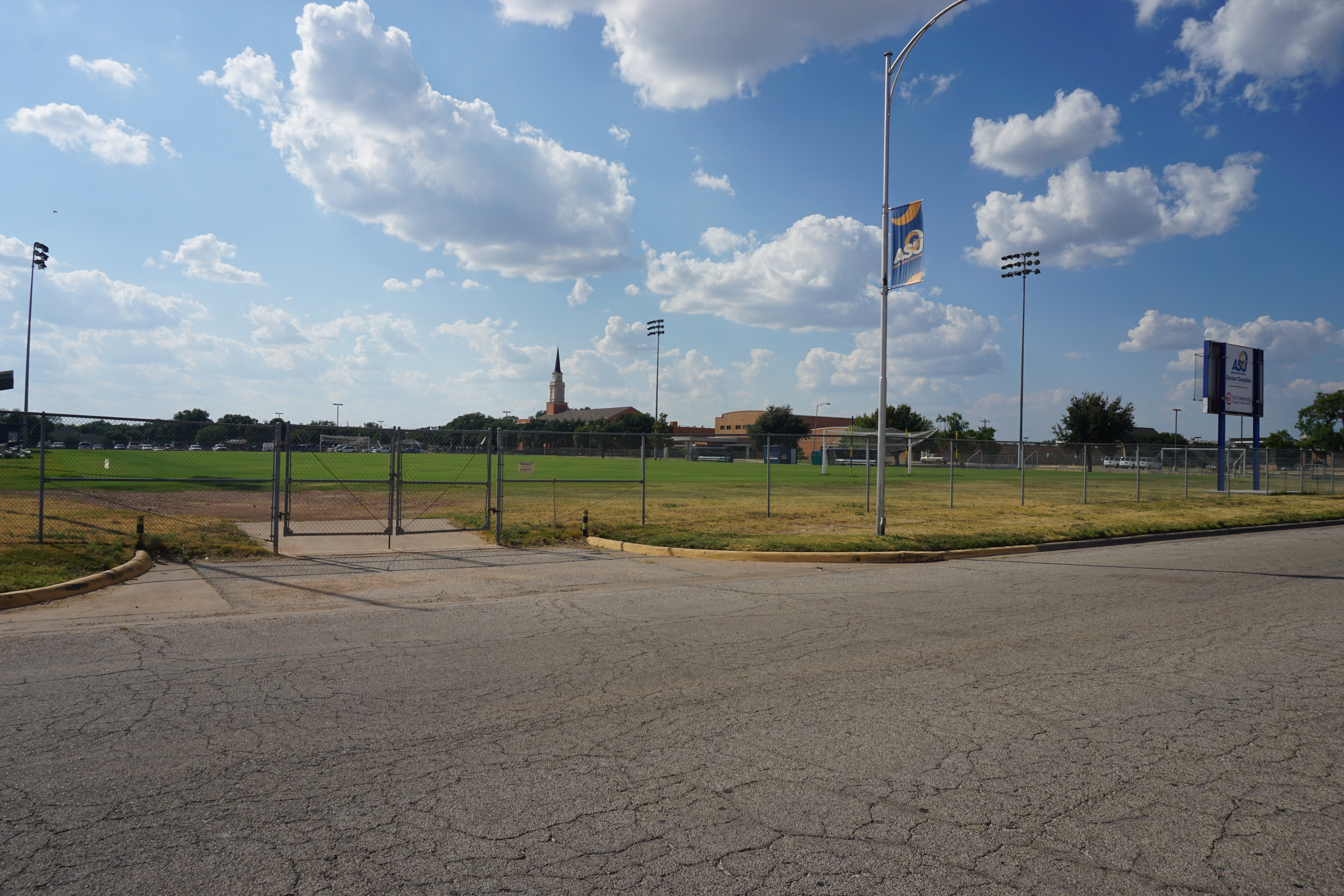
Soccer stadium

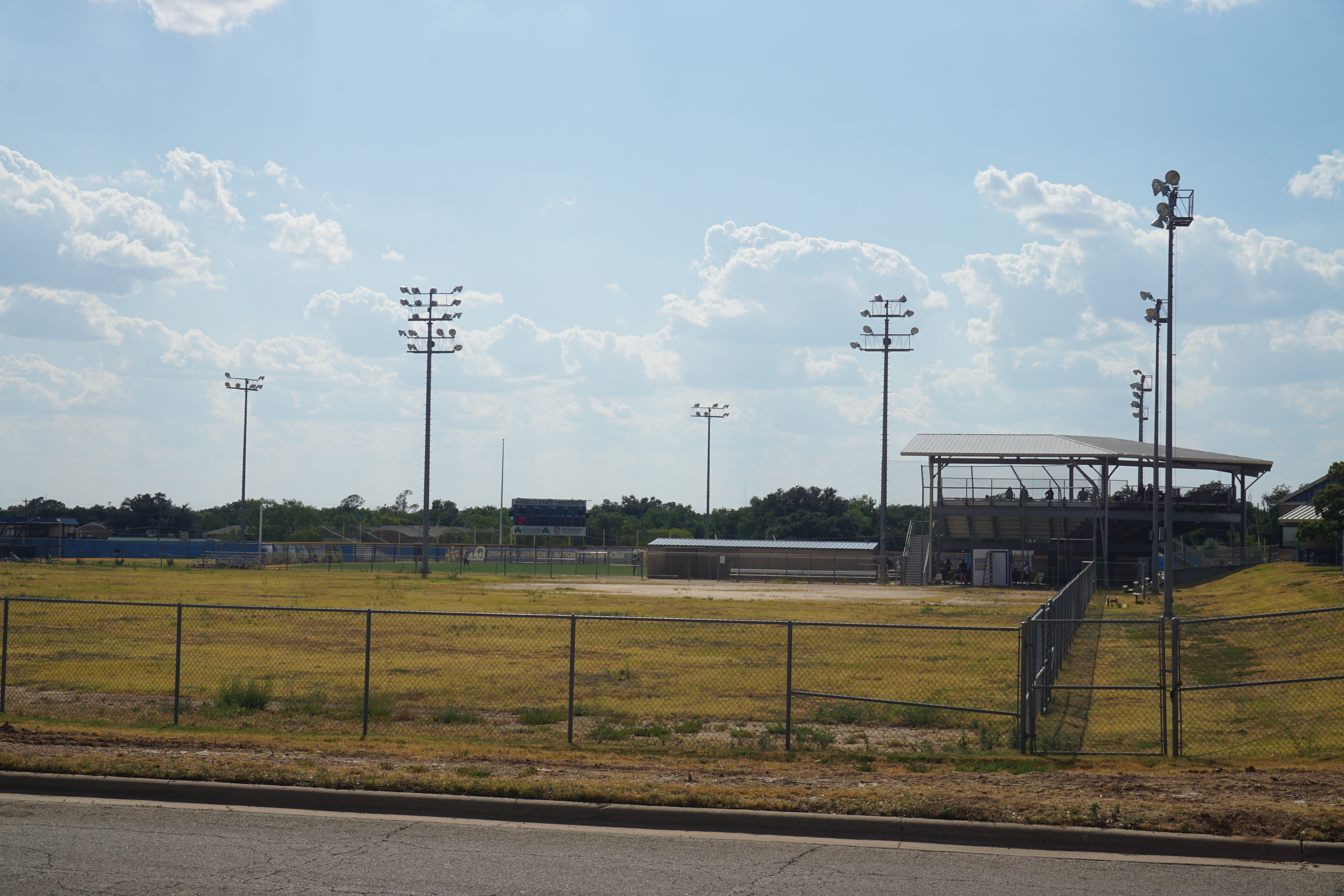
Softball complex

== Accomplishments ==
Men's basketball

- 1957 Rams NJCAA National Championship

Football

- 1978 Rams NAIA Division I National Championship

Softball

- 2004 Rambelles NCAA Division II National Championship

Track & field

- 2010 Rambelles NCAA Division II National Championship

Baseball

- 2023 Rams NCAA Division II National Championship
