= 1947–48 Indiana State Sycamores men's basketball team =

American college basketball season

1947–48 Indiana State Sycamores men's basketball

Indiana Intercollegiate Conference champions

NAIA Men's Division I Tournament, Finalist
- Conference: Indiana Intercollegiate Conference
- Record: 29–7 (7–0 IIC)
- Head coach: John Wooden
- Assistant coaches: Ed Powell; Stan Jacobs
- Home arena: Indiana State Teacher's College Gymnasium

In 1947–48 Indiana State Sycamores men's basketball season, the Sycamores were led by coach John Wooden, NAIB All-American Duane Klueh and future NBA players, John Hazen and Bob Royer. The Sycamores finished as the national runner-up with a record of 27–7; they lost to Louisville by a score of 82–70 in the title game. This season represented Indiana State's second NAIA Final Four, its second national title game and its second national runner-up finish.

== Regular season ==
During the 1947–48 season, Indiana State finished the regular season to finish 23–6, 7–0 in the Indiana Intercollegiate Conference; they won by an average of 18 points per game, setting a new school scoring record, (2,287 points). They finished the season at 29–7; the second highest win total in school history.

Coach John Wooden's second team sprinted out of the gate, winning 11 of their first 12 games; including the mid-season Mid-Western Tournament over Georgetown (KY), Southeastern Oklahoma and Northeast Missouri. They won their 2nd consecutive Indiana Intercollegiate Conference title, qualifying for the NAIA Tournament.

== Post-season ==
In 1947, Wooden's first basketball team won the Indiana Intercollegiate Conference title and received an invitation to the National Association of Intercollegiate Basketball (NAIB) National Tournament in Kansas City. Wooden refused the invitation, citing the NAIB's policy banning African American players; one of Wooden's players was Clarence Walker, an African-American from East Chicago, Indiana.

In 1948, after winning their 2nd Conference title, Indiana State was again invited to the NAIB tournament; the NAIB had reversed its policy banning African-American players that year, and Wooden coached his team to the NAIB National Tournament final, losing to Louisville. This was the only championship game a Wooden-coached team ever lost. That year, Walker became the first African-American to play in any post-season intercollegiate basketball tournament, as the NIT and NCAA tournaments did not integrate until after 1950.

In Kansas City they won their first five games to reach the NAIA Finals. In game 3 vs. San Jose State, the Sycamores were trailing in the second half when Bob Royer, sparked a rally, the Sycamores would win by 7 to reach the Semifinals vs. Hamline. Duane Klueh received several honors at the end of regular season. He won the Chuck Taylor Award as the Most Valuable Player of the Year in the NAIA, he was also selected to the NAIA All-American team. Joining him on the All-Tournament Team was Bob Royer, who was making his 2nd All-Tournament team. Royer was again a member of the All-Tournament Team in 1949 as Indiana State finished 4th in the tournament.

== Roster ==
The Sycamores were led by All-American Klueh, the NAIA Player of the Year, with 17.6 average. He was followed by Don McDonald's 9.4 average. The starting lineup featured four future 1,000 career point scorers; Klueh, Don McDonald, the 1950 Chuck Taylor Award-winner Lenny Rzeszewski, and Bob Royer. The roster also included future Indiana Basketball Hall of Famer, Jim Powers, who became high school coach to UCLA All-American Michael Warren.

Seniors

- #74 Charles Austin (Effingham, Illinois)

Juniors

- #72 Bob Brady - Forward (South Bend, Indiana)
- #54 Duane Klueh - Guard (Indiana State Laboratory School, Terre Haute, Indiana)
- #7_ Dave Presslor - ( )
- #34 Bob Royer - Guard (Bowling Green High School, Bowling Green, Indiana)
- #73 Max Woolsey - (Linton High School, Linton, Indiana)

Sophomores

- #77 Jim Berger - Guard (Jasper High School, Jasper, Indiana)
- #57 Dan Dimich – Forward (South Bend, Indiana)
- #45 Gene Edmonds - ( )
- #52 John Hazen - Forward (South Bend Central High School, South Bend, Indiana)
- #92 Buren Hooper - Center (Bruceville High School, Bruceville, Indiana)
- #33 Bill Jagodzinski (South Bend Central High School, South Bend, Indiana)
- #75 Jerry Kunkel – Guard (Jasper High School, Jasper, Indiana)
- #69 Len Rzeszewski – Guard (South Bend Central High School, South Bend, Indiana)
- #56 Don McDonald – Center (Fontanet High School, Fontanet, Indiana)
- #55 Jim Powers – Forward (South Bend Central High School, South Bend, Indiana)
- #32 Clarence Walker – Guard (East Chicago, Indiana)

Coaches

- Head coach John Wooden - Future 10-time NCAA Champion coach
- Assistant coach Edwin Powell - Future UCLA Assistant and Loyola Marymount Head Coach

== NAIA basketball tournament ==
- Terre Haute District 21
  - Indiana State 85, Hanover (Ind.) 66
  - Indiana State 73, Evansville (Ind.) 61
- Kansas City Nationals
  - Indiana State 72, St. Francis (PA.) 40
  - Indiana State 82, Brigham Young 68
- Elite Eight
  - Indiana State 59, San Jose State 52
- National Semi-Finals
  - Indiana State 66, Hamline 65 (OT)
- National Championship
  - Louisville 82, Indiana State 70

== Awards and honors ==
- Duane Klueh, Consensus NAIA All-American teams
- Duane Klueh – 1948 Chuck Taylor Award
- Bob Royer – 1948 NAIA All-Tournament Team
- John R. Wooden, Indiana College Coach of the Year
