= Ed Messbarger =

American basketball coach (1932–2014)

Biographical details
- Born: July 26, 1932
- Died: June 30, 2014 (aged 81); San Angelo, Texas
- Education: Northwest Missouri State

Coaching career (HC unless noted)
- 1957–1960: Benedictine Heights
- 1960–1963: Dallas
- 1963–1978: St. Mary's (TX)
- 1978–1998: Angelo State

Head coaching record
- Overall: 630–518

Accomplishments and honors

Awards
- NAIA Coach of the Year (1974,1975,1990); NAIA Hall of Fame

Edward Joseph Messbarger (July 26, 1932 – June 30, 2014) was an American college basketball coach. Messbarger amassed over 600 wins as head coach at Benedictine Heights College in Tulsa Oklahoma, the University of Dallas, Saint Mary's University, Texas and Angelo State University.

Messbarger coached at St. Mary's University from 1963 to 1978, coaching the Rattlers to four NAIA tournaments (in 1964, 1967, 1974 and 1975) and produced the future NBA player Robert Reid. Moving to Angelo State, Messbarger won 267 games in twenty seasons with the Rams. He led the program to two Lone Star Conference titles and was twice named conference coach of the year before retiring in 1998.

Messbarger died in his home in San Angelo, Texas, on June 30, 2014.

== Head coaching record ==
Record table
Season	Team	Overall	Conference	Standing	Postseason
Dallas (1960–1963)
St. Mary’s (TX) (Big State Conference) (1963–1978)
1963–64	St. Mary's	22–9	8–2	1st	NAIA Tournament Elite Eight
1964–65	St. Mary's	10–11	5–3		
1965–66	St. Mary's	14–11	7–3		
1966–67	St. Mary's	22–9	8–2	1st	NAIA Tournament Elite Eight
1967–68	St. Mary's	18–11	10–0	1st	District IV finals
1968–69	St. Mary's	12–13	8–2	1st	District IV finals
1969–70	St. Mary's	20–5	10–0	1st	District IV finals
1970–71	St. Mary's	17–9	8–2	1st	District IV finals
1971–72	St. Mary's	17–12	10–2	1st	District IV finals
1972–73	St. Mary's	23–7	12–0	1st	District IV finals
1973–74	St. Mary's	24–9	11–1	1st	NAIA Tournament Final Four
1974–75	St. Mary's	26–7	12–0	1st	NAIA Tournament Final Four
1975–76	St. Mary's	22–6	10–2	1st	District IV finals
1976–77	St. Mary's	23–6	11–1	1st	District IV finals
1977–78	St. Mary's	16–10	8–2	1st	District IV semifinals
Angelo State (Lone Star Conference) (1978–1998)
Total:		630–518			
National champion Postseason invitational champion Conference regular season champion Conference regular season and conference tournament champion Division regular season champion Division regular season and conference tournament champion Conference tournament champion
