= Clarence J. Walker =

American basketball player, teacher, counselor, and administrator

Personal information
- Born: September 23, 1928 Washington, D.C., U.S.
- Died: June 10, 1989 (aged 60) East Chicago, Indiana, U.S.
- Listed height: 5 ft 10 in (1.78 m)
- Listed weight: 157 lb (71 kg)

Career information
- High school: East Chicago Washington (East Chicago, Indiana)
- College: Indiana State (1946–1950)
- Position: Guard

Career highlights
- NAIB National champion (1950); NAIB National Semi-Finals (1949); NAIB National Finalist (1948); Indiana Basketball Hall of Fame member (2022)

Clarence J. Walker (September 23, 1928 – June 10, 1989) was an American college basketball player and, later, a high school teacher, counselor and administrator. He was also a long-time tennis instructor at a number of clubs in Chicago and its Indiana suburbs.

In 1948, he was the first African-American collegiate basketball player to appear in a post-season tournament. He would participate in three post-season tournaments, winning a National Title in 1950.

== High school career ==
Clarence Walker attended Washington High School in East Chicago, Indiana where he played for Johnnie Baratto. In 1946, his senior year, he and Ray Ragelis led the Senators to record of 24–3 winning both a Sectional title and a Regional Championship (Final Sixteen) in the IHSAA State Tournament; they bowed out of the tournament, falling to Culver High School by two points, in the Semi-State. He was also a teammate of Vince Boryla.

== College career ==
After high school, Walker attended Indiana State University, located in Terre Haute, Indiana. He played basketball under head coach John Wooden (1946–1948) and John Longfellow (1948–1950). In 1947, Indiana State refused a NAIB tournament invitation since the tournament did not allow black players to participate, and the team did not want to participate without Walker. The NAIB changed their rules for the 1948 season and Walker's Sycamores made it to the tournament's final, losing to Louisville. Walker helped lead the Sycamores to three consecutive IIC Championships and three NAIB (now NAIA) Tournaments. His Indiana State teams recorded a cumulative record of 95–31 (.754); a 30–4 (.882) in IIC play, including 4 conference titles, the 1950 NAIB National Title; the 1948 NAIB National Title-game and the 1949 NAIB National Title-final four during their four seasons of varsity play.

== Post-college ==
Walker served in the U.S. Army and was a veteran of the Korean War; he was wounded, awarded the Purple Heart, National Defense Service Medal, Korean Service Medal and the United Nations Korea Medal. He returned to in his hometown and embarked on a successful high school teaching career, spending 35 years with the East Chicago City Schools, retiring as an Assistant Superintendent. He was a tennis instructor at a number of clubs and fitness centers in and around Chicago.

In November, 2021; Walker's induction as part of the 60th Class of the Indiana Basketball Hall of Fame was announced.
