= Chiles Center =

Arena in Portland, Oregon, U.S.

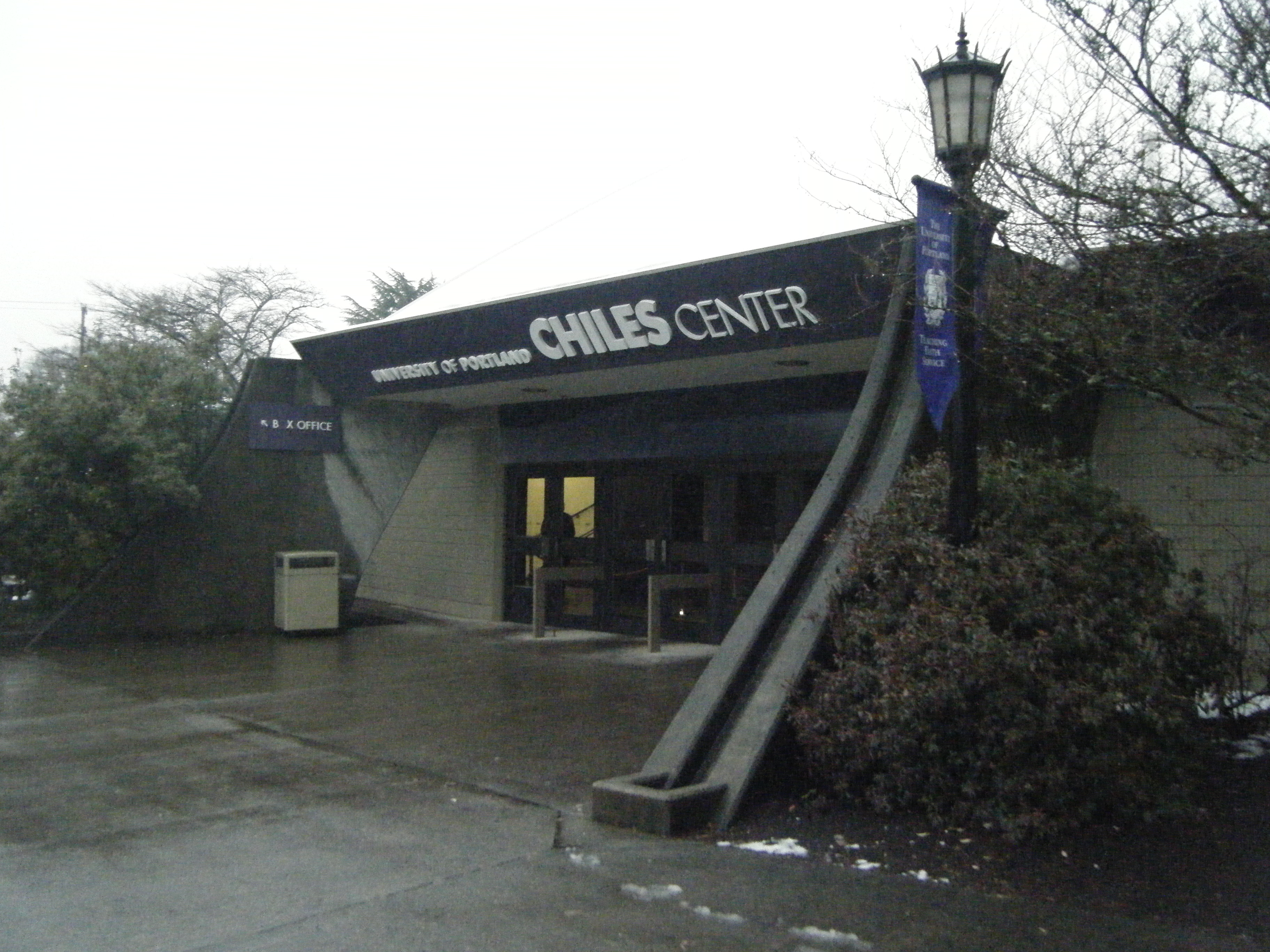

- Location within Portland, Oregon Location within Oregon Location within the United States
- Full name: The Earle A. & Virginia H. Chiles Center
- Location: University Park, Portland, Oregon
- Coordinates: 45.575°N 122.728°W
- Owner: University of Portland
- Capacity: 4,852

Construction
- Groundbreaking: May 18, 1983
- Opened: October 20, 1984

Tenants
- Portland Pilots (NCAA) (1984–present); OSAA Class 6A State Basketball Championships (1997–1998, 2015–present); Rip City Remix (NBA G League) (2023–present)

The Earle A. & Virginia H. Chiles Center is a 4,852-seat multi-purpose arena in Portland, Oregon, United States. The arena opened in 1984. It is home to the University of Portland Pilots men's and women's basketball teams as well as the women's volleyball team. It hosted the West Coast Conference men's basketball tournament in 1992 and 2007. Starting with the 2023–2024 season, the Chiles Center hosts the Portland Trail Blazers' NBA G League team, the Rip City Remix.

The arena is also used for other athletic tournaments as well as for concerts and other special events such as high school graduations. It contains 20,000 square feet (1,900 m^{2}) of arena floor space.

== History ==
Construction on the center began in 1983 with an endowment from the Chiles Foundation, replacing Howard Hall. The new facility opened on October 20, 1984, and was dedicated and blessed by the Archbishop of Portland, Cornelius M. Power. One of the first events at the Chiles Center was a re-election campaign speech by President Ronald Reagan, who visited the campus on October 23, 1984.

In 2006, the school completed $1 million in upgrades to the women's locker rooms, followed by renovations of the weight room in 2008. In 2010, the scoreboard over center court was replaced with a new center-hung video system. In addition to the video system, two new basketball scoreboards were installed along with three-sided shot clocks. The school plans to continue renovations, as well as some expansion, with a $2 million project on upgrading the men's locker rooms, as well as expansions and the construction of a study center for student athletes. In 2023, the school received a further $5 million from the Chiles Foundation towards renovation and maintenance of the arena.

== Gallery ==
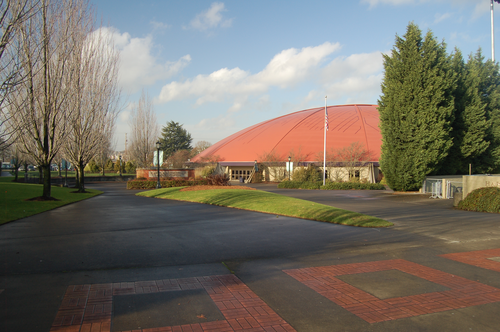
Exterior of the Chiles Center in 2007

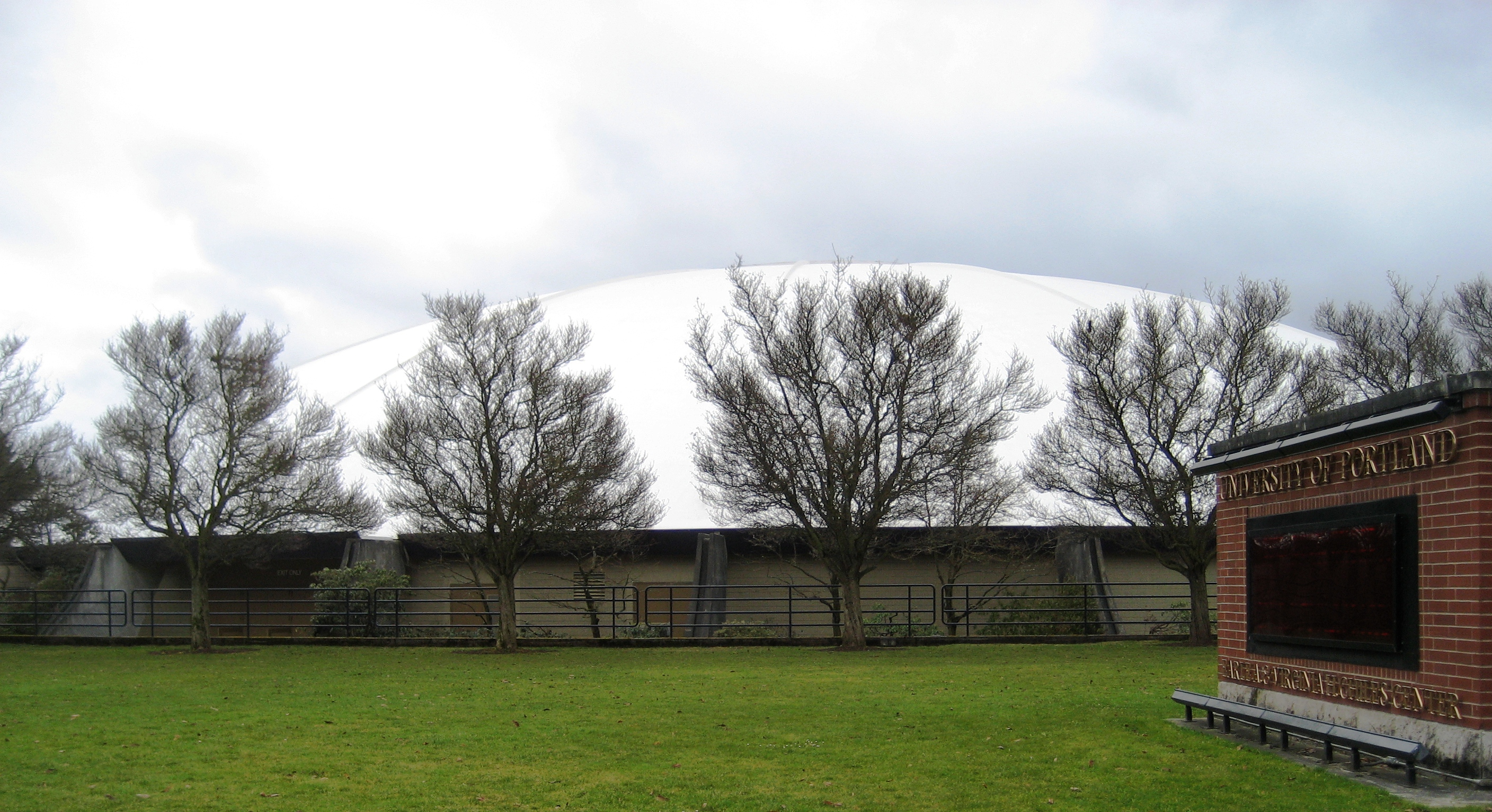
Exterior of the Chiles Center from Willamette Blvd. in 2009

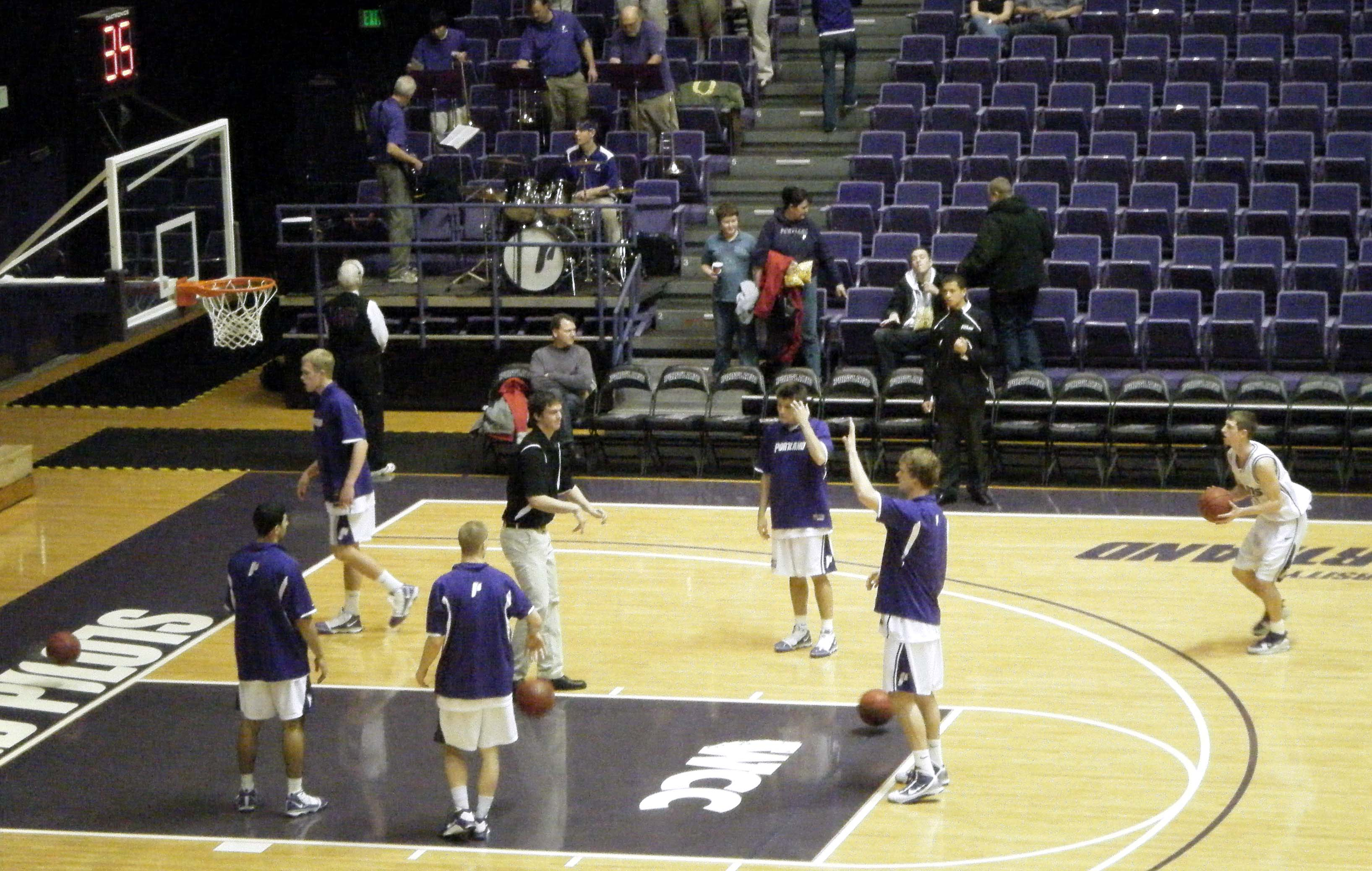
The Portland Pilots Men's Basketball Team warming up inside the Chiles Center in 2009

== See also ==
- List of sports venues in Portland, Oregon
- List of NCAA Division I basketball arenas
