= John Hazen =

John Hazen may refer to:

- John Douglas Hazen, politician in New Brunswick, Canada
- John Hazen (basketball), American basketball player
