= Central Arkansas Bears basketball =

Central Arkansas Bears men's basketball
2026–27 Central Arkansas Bears basketball team
- University: University of Central Arkansas
- Head coach: John Shulman (3rd season)
- Location: Conway, Arkansas
- Arena: Farris Center (capacity: 6,000)
- Conference: UAC
- Nickname: Bears
- Colors: Purple and gray

NCAA Division I tournament round of 32
- 2005*

NCAA Division I tournament appearances
- 2005*

Conference regular-season champions
- 2026
- * at the Division II level

For information on all University of Central Arkansas sports, see Central Arkansas Bears and Sugar Bears
For information about the Central Arkansas women's team, see Central Arkansas Sugar Bears basketball.

The Central Arkansas Bears basketball team represents the University of Central Arkansas (UCA) in NCAA Division I men's basketball competition. UCA currently plays in the United Athletic Conference, which it joined in 2026 after 15 seasons as a member of the Southland Conference. The Bears play home games at the Farris Center located on the UCA campus in Conway, Arkansas and are currently led by head coach John Shulman.

Prior to competition at the NCAA Division I level, the Bears also competed in the NAIA and NCAA Division II. At the NCAA Division I level, the Bears have never qualified for the NCAA tournament.

== Postseason ==
=== NCAA Division II Tournament ===
Year	Round	Opponent	Result
2005	Regional Quarterfinals; Regional semifinals	West Georgia; Lynn	W 74–71; L 69–73

=== NAIA Tournament ===
The Bears have appeared in 15 NAIA tournaments. Their combined record is 13–16.

Year	Round	Opponent	Result
1937	Quarterfinals; Semifinals; 3rd-place game	Saint Benedict's; Morningside; Southwestern (KS)	W 34–33; L 33–40; L 38–46
1938	First round	Central State (OK)	L 34–43
1940	First round	Kansas Wesleyan	L 33–45
1942	First round	Pittsburg State	L 34–37
1946	First round	Pepperdine	L 37–63
1948	First round	Manhattan	L 60–65
1959	First round Second Round	Pikeville; Fort Hays State	W 70–67; L 48–59
1961	First round	Westminster (PA)	L 60–68
1974	First round	Hanover	L 83–87
1975	First round	Alcorn State	L 77–88
1980	First round Second Round; Quarterfinals	Augsburg; Rockhurst; Alabama State	W 67–61; W 54–53; L 53–67
1990	First round Second Round	Paul Quinn; David Lipscomb	W 62–53; L 66–70
1991	First round Second Round; Quarterfinals; Semifinals; National Championship Game	Olivet Nazarene; Rio Grande; Athens State; Taylor; Oklahoma City	W 75–66; W 99–67; W 95–64; W 66–60; L 74–77
1992	First round Second Round; Quarterfinals; Semifinals; National Championship Game	Charleston (WV); Spring Hill; Erskine; BYU Hawaiʻi; Oklahoma City	W 77–70; W 87–83; W 74–62; W 72–65; L 73–82
1993	First round	Central Washington	L 66–78

=== CBI results ===
The Bears have appeared in the College Basketball Invitational (CBI) one time. Their record is 1–1.

Year	Round	Opponent	Result
2018	First round Quarterfinals	Seattle; Jacksonville State	W 92–90^{OT} L 59–80

== Retired numbers ==
No.	Player	Pos.	Tenure	No. ret.	Ref.
33	Scottie Pippen (Note: Member of the Naismith Memorial Basketball Hall of Fame.)	SF	1983–1987	Jan 2010	
