= 1937 National Intercollegiate Basketball Tournament =

College basketball tournament

- Teams: 8
- Finals site: Municipal Auditorium, Kansas City, Missouri
- Champions: Central Missouri State (1st title, 1st title game, 1st Final Four)
- Runner-up: Morningside (1st title game, 1st Final Four)
- Semifinalists: Southwestern (KS) (1st Fab Four); Arkansas State Teachers (1st Fab Four)

The 1937 NAIA men's basketball tournament was held in March at Municipal Auditorium in Kansas City, Missouri. The first annual National Association of Intercollegiate Athletics (NAIA) basketball tournament featured eight teams playing in a single-elimination format. In 1938, it would expand to its current size of 32 teams.

This tournament is unique because it was started two years prior to the NCAA men's tournament and one year before the National Invitation Tournament, and all the teams play over a series of six days instead of several weekends. The compactness of the tournament has given it the nickname "college basketball's toughest tournament".

It began when Dr. James Naismith, Emil S. Liston, Frank Cramer, and local leaders formed the National College Basketball Tournament, which was staged at Municipal Auditorium in Kansas City, Missouri. The goal of the tournament was to establish a forum for small colleges and universities to determine a national basketball champion.

The first championship game featured Central Missouri State University defeating Morningside College 35–24. It is also the lowest scoring championship game in tournament history.

== Awards and honors ==
Many of the records set by the 1937 tournament have been broken, and many of the awards were established much later:

- Leading scorer est. 1963
- Leading rebounder est. 1963
- Chuck Taylor Most Valuable Player est. 1939
- Charles Stevenson Hustle Award est. 1958
- Coach of the Year est. 1954
- Player of the Year est. 1994

== Bracket ==
First round
Southwestern (KS)	54
Dakota Wesleyan	26
Luther	38
Central Missouri State	56
Arkansas State Teachers	34
St. Benedict's	33
Baker	21
Morningside	29

Semifinals
Southwestern (KS)	24
Central Missouri State	38
Arkansas State Teachers	33
Morningside	40

NAIA national championship
Central Missouri State	35
Morningside	24
NAIA Third Place
Southwestern (KS)	46
Arkansas State Teachers	38

The third place game featured the losing teams from the national semifinals to determine 3rd and 4th places in the tournament. This game was played until 1988.
