= Angelo State Rams basketball =

Basketball team in NCAA Division II

Angelo State Rams
- University: Angelo State University
- Head coach: Vinay Patel (5th season)
- Conference: Lone Star Conference
- Location: San Angelo, Texas
- Arena: Stephens Arena (capacity: 6,500)
- Nickname: Rams
- Colors: Blue and gold

Uniforms
Home	Away	Alternate

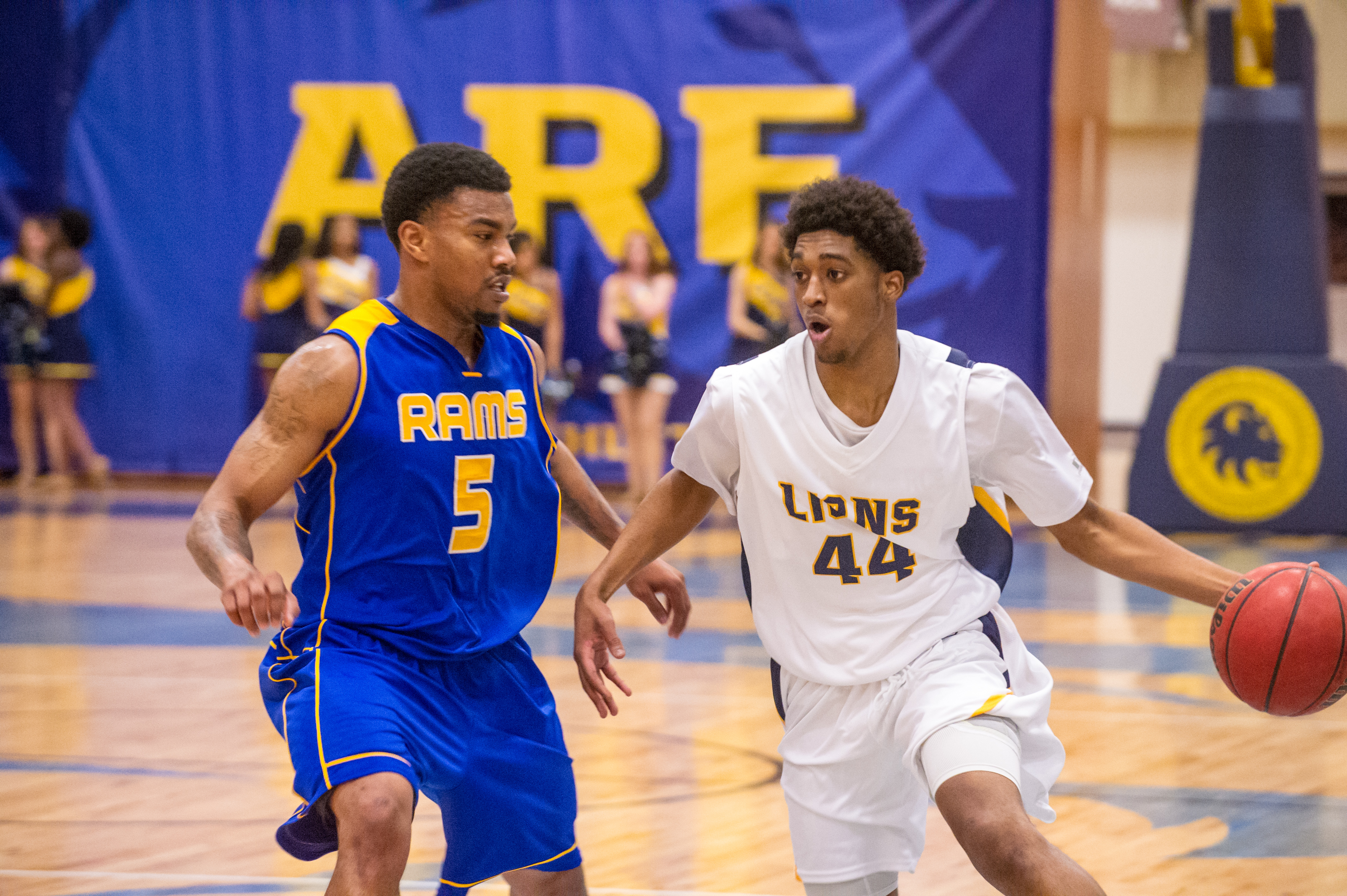
The Rams men's basketball team in action against the Texas A&M–Commerce Lions in 2015

The Angelo State Rams basketball team represents Angelo State University in men's college basketball. They compete at the NCAA Division II level and are members of the Lone Star Conference. The Rams play home games at Stephens Arena, a 6,500-capacity arena in San Angelo, Texas, on the campus of Angelo State University. Vinay Patel is the current coach.

== Head coaches ==
Coach	Years	Record	Percentage
Phil George	1964–1978	176–171	.507
Ed Messbarger	1978–1998	261–289	.475
Joe Esposito	1998–2006	188–99	.655
John Greene	2006	0–4	.000
Fred Rike	2006–2012	60–75	.444
Chris Beard	2013–2015	47–15	.758
Cinco Boone	2015–2022	129–67	.658
Vinay Patel	2022–present	62–30	.674

== Championships ==
Angelo State University basketball has experienced many highlights since its beginning in 1923 as San Angelo College, the high point being a national championship in 1957 as a member of the NJCAA. Since the creation and joining of the NCAA, Angelo State has made multiple playoff appearances, and has been crowned Lone Star Conference champions in 1984, 1988, 1989 and 2001.

== Rams in the NBA draft ==
- Marcus Hubbard – Milwaukee Bucks
- Greg Wolff – Houston Rockets

== Rams in international basketball ==
- Chris Jones (born 1993), basketball player for Maccabi Tel Aviv of the Israeli Basketball Premier League
