= 1949–50 Indiana State Sycamores men's basketball team =

American college basketball season

1949–50 Indiana State Sycamores men's basketball

Indiana Intercollegiate Conference champions

NAIA Men's Division I Tournament, Champion
- Conference: Indiana Intercollegiate Conference
- Record: 27–8 (7–2 IIC)
- Head coach: John Longfellow
- Home arena: Indiana State Teacher's College Gymnasium

The 1949–50 Indiana State Sycamores men's basketball season is considered one of the greatest in the school's history. The Sycamore's were led by NAIB All-American Lenny Len Rzeszewski. He led them to the national title game versus East Central Oklahoma and ended the season as the National Champion with a record of 27–8. This season was Indiana State's 4th NAIA Final Four, its 3rd National Title game and its 1st National Championship.

== Regular season ==
During the 1949–50 season, Indiana State finished the regular season 20–8, 7–2 in the Indiana Intercollegiate Conference. They won on average by over 10 points per game, dropping a hard-fought battle to the national ranked (# 2) Duquesne Dukes on the road.

They won 4 of 5 during their Christmas vacation road-trip before kicking off the conference schedule.

They won the NAIA Regional Championship by downing Hanover and Evansville and qualified for the NAIA tournament.

Once in Kansas City they ran the table winning their first NAIA National title (after twice finishing 2nd.) Len Rzeszewski received several honors at the end of regular season including the Chuck Taylor Award as the Most Valuable Player of the Year in the NAIA. He was also selected to the NAIA All-American team.

== Roster ==
The Sycamores were led by Rzeszewski, the NAIA Player of the Year and his 13.4 average. He was followed by Don McDonald's 13.2 average. The starting lineup also included Jim Powers, Bob Gilbert and Clarence Walker. The remainder of the roster consisted of Dan Dimich, Bill Jagodzinski, Jim Berger, Jim Hans, and Jerry Kunkel.

SENIORS

- #76 Dan Dimich – Forward (South Bend, Indiana)
- #55 Bill Jagodzinski - Guard (South Bend, Indiana)
- #75 Jerry Kunkel – Forward (Jasper, Indiana)
- #34 Ed Longfellow – Guard (Elkhart, Indiana)
- #69 Len Rzeszewski – Guard (South Bend, Indiana)
- #74 Don McDonald – Center (Fontanet, Indiana)
- #72 Jim Powers – Forward (South Bend, Indiana)
- #32 Clarence Walker – Guard (East Chicago, Indiana)

JUNIORS

- #92 Jim Berger – Guard (Jasper, Indiana)
- #58 Richard "Blondie" Campbell – Guard (Elkhart, Indiana)
- #73 Bob Gilbert – Center
- #82 Buren Hooper – Forward (Bruceville, Indiana)
- #54 Max Hungerford – Guard
- #56 Dick Pattengale – Forward
- #57 Jack Reece – Forward
- #77 John Scott – Forward

SOPHOMORES

- #33 Gene Lambdin – Guard

FRESHMEN

- #81 Jim Hans – Guard (South Bend, Indiana)

== NAIA basketball tournament ==
- Terre Haute Regionals
  - Indiana State 85, Hanover 66
  - Indiana State 73, Evansville 61
- Kansas City National Quarter-finals
  - Indiana State 65, Delta State (Miss.) 59
  - Indiana State 87, Arkansas Tech 79
- National Semi-finals
  - Indiana State 61, Baldwin-Wallace 39
  - Indiana State 73, Tampa 69

*National Championship

- Indiana State 61, East Central 57

== Awards and honors ==
- Lenny Rzeszewski, Consensus NAIA All-American teams
- Lenny Rzeszewski – 1950 Chuck Taylor Award
- Dan Dimich – 1950 NAIA All-Tournament Team
- Don McDonald – 1950 NAIA All-Tournament Team
- John L. Longfellow, Indiana College Coach of the Year
