= John Hazen (basketball) =

American basketball player

Personal information
- Born: March 2, 1927 South Bend, Indiana
- Died: October 21, 1998 (aged 71) Rochester, Minnesota
- Listed height: 6 ft 2 in (1.88 m)
- Listed weight: 172 lb (78 kg)

Career information
- High school: South Bend Central (South Bend, Indiana)
- College: Indiana State (1946–1948)
- BAA draft: 1948: undrafted
- Position: Guard
- Number: 10, 3

Career history
- 1948: Boston Celtics
- 1949: Hartford Hurricanes
- 1949: Manchester Guards

Career NBA statistics
- Points: 18 (3.0 ppg)
- Assists: 3 (0.5 apg)
- Stats at NBA.com
- Stats at Basketball Reference

John William Hazen (March 2, 1927 – October 21, 1998) was an American professional basketball player. A 6'2" guard from Indiana State University, Hazen played one season (1948–1949) in the Basketball Association of America as a member of the Boston Celtics. The Celtics coach was future Hall of Famer Doggie Julian He averaged 3.0 points per game and 0.5 assists per game. Hazen spent approximately half of the 1948–49 season with the Harford Hurricanes, as well as spending some time on the roster of the EBL-Ct's Manchester Guards.

Hazen attended Central High School in South Bend, Indiana, just missing the opportunity to play for John Wooden, they would meet later at Indiana State. After completing high school, Hazen served in the US Army Air Forces during World War II; following the war, he enrolled at Indiana State Teacher's College.

While at Indiana State University, Hazen was a 2-year letterman for the Sycamores, helping the team reach the NAIA Men's Division I Tournament, finishing as National Finalist in 1948. During his collegiate career, the Sycamores recorded a record of 44–15 (.746), won two IIC titles and an NAIA District title.

Hazen played for Glenn M. Curtis as a freshman and the legendary John Wooden as a sophomore and junior.

Though the statistical records are intermittent, Hazen scored over 100 points during his collegiate career. Two of his teammates, Duane Klueh and Bob Royer also had NBA careers.

The 1948 season marked the beginning of integrated post-season tournament play, as Clarence Walker and Indiana State broke the barrier.

== BAA career statistics ==
Legend
GP	Games played
FG%	Field-goal percentage
FT%	Free-throw percentage
APG	Assists per game
PPG	Points per game

=== Regular season ===
Year	Team	GP	FG%	FT%	APG	PPG
1948–49	Boston	6	.353	.857	.5	3.0
Career		6	.353	.857	.5	3.0
