= 1975 NAIA basketball tournament =

1975 NAIA men's basketball tournament
- Season: 1974–75
- Teams: 32
- Finals site: Kemper Arena; Kansas City, Missouri
- Champions: Grand Canyon (1 title, 1 title game, 1 Final Four)
- Runner-up: Midwestern State (1 title game, 1 Final Four)
- Semifinalists: Alcorn State (2 Final Four); St. Mary's (TX) (2 Final Four)
- Coach of the year: Ed Messbarger (St. Mary’s (Texas))
- Charles Stevenson Hustle Award: Tom Kropp (Kearney State (NE))
- MVP: Bayard Forrest (Grand Canyon (AZ))
- Top scorer: John McGill (Alcorn State (Miss.)) ( points)

The 1975 NAIA men's basketball tournament was held in March at Kemper Arena in Kansas City, Missouri. The 38th annual NAIA basketball tournament featured 32 teams playing in a single-elimination format. This would be the first tournament played in Kemper Arena. Kemper would host the NAIA Tournament until 1993, when the NAIA would move the tournament and its offices to Tulsa.

== Awards and honors ==
- Leading scorer: John McGill, Alcorn State (Miss.)
- Leading rebounder:
- Player of the Year: est. 1994

== 1975 NAIA bracket ==
First round	Second round
1	Kentucky State	77
-	Malone (Ohio)	85
-	Malone	80
16	Tri-State	63
-	Husson (Maine)	78
16	Tri-State (Ind.)	96
TOP TIER
9	Edinboro State (Pa.)	94
-	Palm Beach Atlantic (Fla.)	86
9	Edinboro State	79
8	Alcorn State	85
-	Central Arkansas	77
8	Alcorn State (Miss.)	88
5	Grand Canyon (Ariz.)	83
-	Willamette (Ore.)	60
5	Grand Canyon	66
12	Illinois Wesleyan	63
-	Montevallo (Ala.)	67
12	Illinois Wesleyan	76
TOP TIER
13	Wisconsin–Parkside	57
-	Morningside (Iowa)	54
13	Wisconsin–Parkside	51
4	Marymount	48
-	Monmouth (N.J.)	72
4	Marymount (Kan.)	86
3	St. Mary's (Tex.)	75
-	Newberry (S.C.)	59
3	St. Mary's	75
-	Millersville	59
-	Millersville State (Pa.)	82
14	Ferris State (Mich.)	81
BOTTOM TIER
11	Winston-Salem State (N.C.)	82
-	Eastern Montana	75
11	Winston-Salem State	57
6	Central Washington State	56
-	East Central State (Okla.)	65
6	Central Washington State	76
7	Midwestern State (Tex.)	89
-	United States International (Calif.)	62
7	Midwestern State	90
10	Norfolk State	87
-	William Jewell (Mo.)	64
10	Norfolk State (Va.)	83
BOTTOM TIER
15	Winona State (Minn.)	93
-	Bryant (R.I.)	72
15	Winona State	84
2	Fairmont State	102
-	Kearney State (Neb.)	86
2	Fairmont State (W.Va.)	94

Elite Eight
-	Malone	87
8	Alcorn State	101
13	Wisconsin–Parkside	54
5	Grand Canyon	70
3	St. Mary's	67
11	Winston-Salem State	59
7	Midwestern State	85
2	Fairmont State	80

NAIA national semifinals
8	Alcorn State	68
5	Grand Canyon	88
7	Midwestern State	65
3	St. Mary's	60

NAIA national championship
5	Grand Canyon	65
7	Midwestern State	54

=== Third-place game ===
The third-place game featured the losing teams from the national semifinalist to determine 3rd and 4th places in the tournament. This game was played until 1988. This particular Consolation Game between Alcorn State and St. Mary's was rematch of a 1974 Semifinal game (Alcorn State won both games).

NAIA third-place game
8	Alcorn State	76
3	St. Mary's	74

== See also ==
- 1975 NCAA Division I men's basketball tournament
- 1975 NCAA Division II men's basketball tournament
- 1975 NCAA Division III men's basketball tournament
