= Junell Center =

Multi-purpose arena in San Angelo, Texas

Junnel Center/Stephens Arena
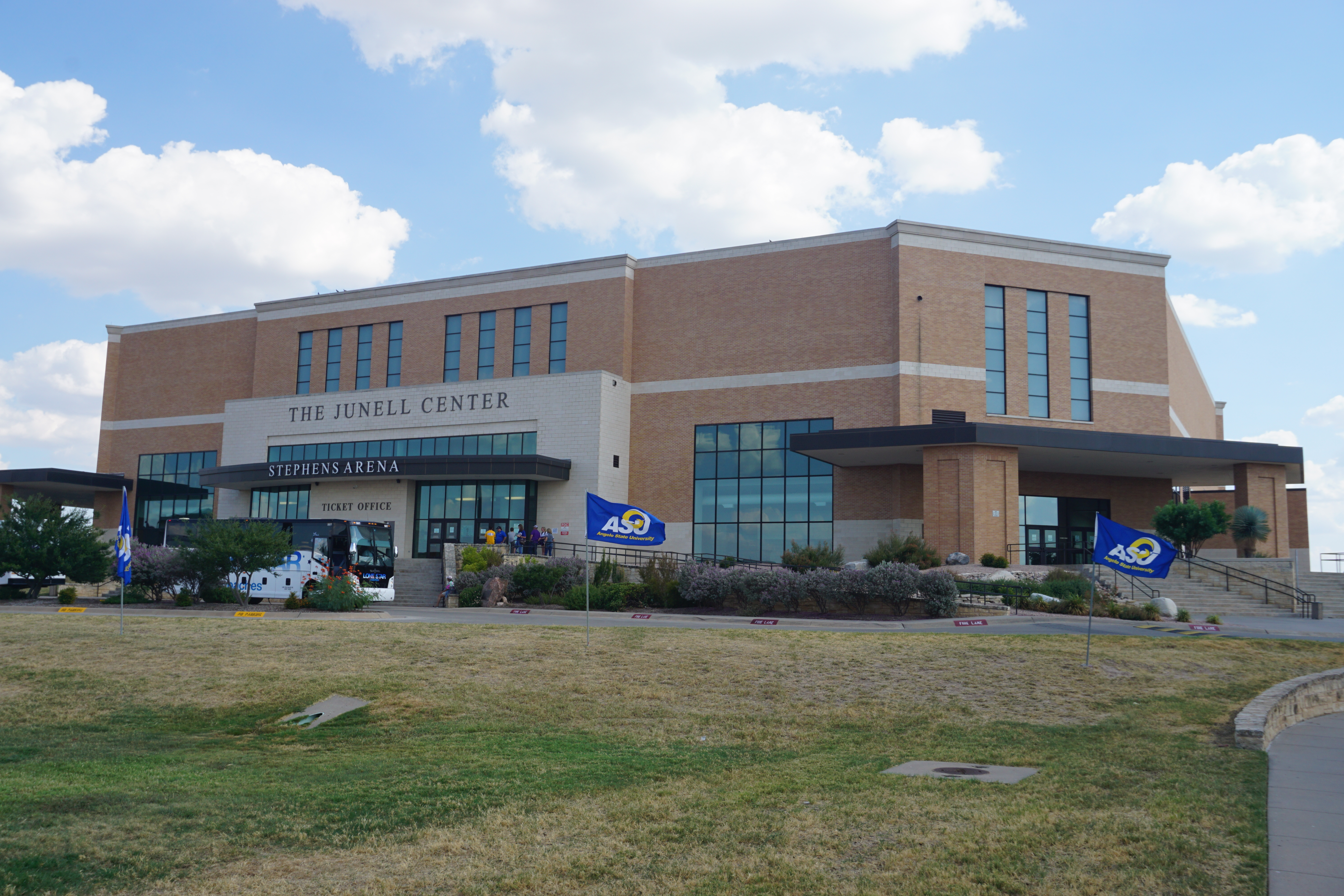
- Stephens Arena San Angelo, Texas.
- Interactive map of Junnel Center/Stephens Arena
- Location: 2235 South Jackson Street; San Angelo, Texas 76909
- Coordinates: 31.437323°N 100.458094°W
- Owner: Angelo State University
- Operator: Angelo State University
- Capacity: 6,500

Construction
- Opened: 2002
- Cost: $22 million

Tenants
- Angelo State University; Men's & Women's Basketball; Women's Volleyball

Junell Center/Stephens Arena is a 6,500 seat multi-purpose arena in San Angelo, Texas. Built in 2001, the arena is owned and operated by Angelo State University. It is the home of the Angelo State Rams and Rambelles basketball teams and the Rambelles volleyball team.

It features a 9x12 foot video screen and an Honors Lounge housed in the Junell Center, overlooking the Stephens Arena floor. A Hall of Fame concourse heralds the accomplishments of ASU athletes through the ages.

In addition to athletics it features speaking engagements, distinguished lecture series, cultural programs, exhibitions as many community activities that are staged in this facility. Angelo State frequently holds concerts at the arena. Groups that have played there include Maroon 5, Baby Bash, Miranda Lambert, Hoobastank, Dj Dmoney, Lostprophets, Chingy and Dierks Bentley.
