= 1944 NAIA basketball tournament =

College basketball tournament

1944 NAIA men's basketball tournament
- Teams: 0
- Finals site: Municipal Auditorium scheduled Kansas City, Missouri
- Champions: None
- Runner-up: None
- Semifinalists: None; None
- Chuck Taylor MVP: Not awarded
- Attendance: 0

The 1944 NAIA men's basketball tournament was not held due to the United States' involvement in World War II. It would resume with the 8th annual 1945 NAIA Division I men's basketball tournament the following year.
