= NCAA Track and Field Championship =

NCAA Track and Field Championship may refer to:

In the United States:

- NCAA Men's Outdoor Track and Field Championship
  - NCAA Men's Division I Outdoor Track and Field Championships
  - NCAA Men's Division II Outdoor Track and Field Championships
  - NCAA Men's Division III Outdoor Track and Field Championships
- NCAA Men's Indoor Track and Field Championship
  - NCAA Men's Division I Indoor Track and Field Championships
  - NCAA Men's Division II Indoor Track and Field Championships
  - NCAA Men's Division III Indoor Track and Field Championships
- NCAA Women's Outdoor Track and Field Championship
  - NCAA Women's Division I Outdoor Track and Field Championships
  - NCAA Women's Division II Outdoor Track and Field Championships
  - NCAA Women's Division III Outdoor Track and Field Championships
- NCAA Women's Indoor Track and Field Championship
  - NCAA Women's Division I Indoor Track and Field Championships
  - NCAA Women's Division II Indoor Track and Field Championships
  - NCAA Women's Division III Indoor Track and Field Championships

In the Philippines:

- NCAA Track and Field Championship (Philippines)
