= 1974 NAIA basketball tournament =

College basketball tournament

1974 NAIA men's basketball tournament
- Season: 1973–74
- Teams: 32
- Finals site: Municipal Auditorium; Kansas City, Missouri
- Champions: West Georgia (1 title, 1 title game, 1 Final Four)
- Runner-up: Alcorn State (1 title game, 1 Final Four)
- Semifinalists: St. Mary's (TX) (1 Final Four); Kentucky State (4 (other 3 Champs of NAIA) Final Four)
- Coach of the year: Roger Kaiser (West Georgia)
- Charles Stevenson Hustle Award: George Harris (St. Mary's (TX))
- MVP: Foots Walker (West Georgia)

The 1974 NAIA men's basketball tournament was held in March at Municipal Auditorium in Kansas City, Missouri. The 37th annual NAIA basketball tournament featured 32 teams playing in a single-elimination format. It would be the last tournament to be played in Municipal until 2002. In 1975, it would be held in the new Kemper Arena. Kemper would host the NAIA Tournament until 1993, when the NAIA would move the tournament and its offices to Tulsa.

== Awards and honors ==
- Leading scorer:
- Leading rebounder:
- Player of the Year: est. 1994

== 1974 NAIA bracket ==
First round	Second round
1	Fairmont State (W.V.)	92
-	Cameron (Okla.)	88
1	Fairmont State	55
16	St. Mary's	71
-	Keene State (N.H.)	66
16	St. Mary's (Tex.)	95
TOP TIER
9	Wisconsin-Eau Claire	50
-	Washburn (Kan.)	67
-	Washburn	55
8	Augustana	57
-	Wartburg (Iowa)	64
8	Augustana (Ill.)	85
5	Hanover (Ind.)	87
-	State College of Arkansas	83
5	Hanover	85
12	Northwestern State	76
-	Millersville State (Pa.)	76
12	Northwestern State (La.)	95
TOP TIER
13	Missouri Western State	96
-	Monmouth (N.J.)	84
13	Missouri Western State	72
4	Alcorn State	80
-	Central Washington State	55
4	Alcorn State (Miss.)	93
3	Gardner–Webb (N.C.)	91
-	Oregon Tech	56
3	Gardner–Webb	101
14	West Georgia	116
-	Huron (S.D.)	71
14	West Georgia	102
BOTTOM TIER
11	Azusa Pacific (California)	74
-	Indiana (Pa.)	79
-	Indiana	66
6	Grand Canyon	65
-	Virginia State	65
6	Grand Canyon (Ariz.)	69
7	Midwestern (Tex.)	77
-	Defiance (Ohio)	63
7	Midwestern	92
10	St. Thomas	78
-	Grand Valley State (Mich.)	71
10	St. Thomas (Minn.)	95
BOTTOM TIER
15	Hastings (Neb.)	96
-	Roger Williams (R.I.)	61
15	Hastings	57
2	Kentucky State	75
-	Erskine (S.C.)	69
2	Kentucky State	82

Elite Eight
16	St. Mary's	74
8	Augustana	65
5	Hanover	102
4	Alcorn State	107*
14	West Georgia	102
-	Indiana	69
7	Midwestern	74
2	Kentucky State	80

NAIA national semifinals
16	St. Mary's	71
4	Alcorn State	76
14	West Georgia	79
2	Kentucky State	75

NAIA national championship
4	Alcorn State	79
14	West Georgia	97

- * denotes double overtime.

=== Third-place game ===
The third-place game featured the losing teams from the national semifinalist to determine 3rd and 4th places in the tournament. This game was played until 1988.

NAIA third-place game
16	St. Mary's (TX)	79
2	Kentucky State	95

== See also ==
- 1974 NCAA Division I basketball tournament
- 1974 NCAA Division II basketball tournament
