= Columbia Prep (Portland, Oregon) =

Columbia Preparatory School was a Roman Catholic boys high school in Portland, Oregon that was affiliated with the University of Portland from 1901 to 1955. The school was known colloquially as Columbia Prep.

The high school and the university (which was originally called "Columbia University") shared the same administration and faculty from 1901 to 1935 and the same campus from 1901 to 1948. When the university changed its name to the University of Portland in 1935, the high school retained its original name.

For the 1948–49 school year, the school moved from the university campus to a new campus at 3701 Southwest Shattuck Road in Portland.

The school closed in 1955 because the Congregation of the Holy Cross, which had founded the school and run it throughout its existence, could no longer afford to maintain it. During its final school year, the high school enrolled 195 male students.

The athletic teams of Columbia Prep were named the Crusaders.
