= 1952–53 Indiana State Sycamores men's basketball team =

American college basketball season

1952–53 Indiana State Sycamores men's basketball

NAIA District 21 champions

NAIA men's Division I tournament, semi-finalist
- Conference: Indiana Collegiate Conference
- Record: 23–8 (6–4 ICC)
- Head coach: John Longfellow
- Assistant coach: Paul Stemm
- Home arena: Indiana State Teacher's College Gymnasium

In the 1952–53 Indiana State Sycamores men's basketball season, the Sycamores were led by coach John Longfellow, NAIB All-American Dick Atha and All-Indiana Collegiate Conference players Roger Adkins, Cliff Murray and Sam Richardson. They participated in their 8th NAIA Tourney. The Sycamores finished as the National Third Place team, with their victory over East Texas State and finished with a record of 23–8. This season represented Indiana State's 5th NAIA Final Four and its 1st National Third Place finish.

== Regular season ==
During the 1952–53 season, Indiana State finished the regular season to finish 17–7, 6–4 in the Indiana Collegiate Conference; they won by an average of 14 points per game, and set a new school scoring record, (2,321 points). They broke the 100-point mark twice; scoring 106 points (vs. Kansas Wesleyan in the Midwest Tournament) and 101 vs. Manchester (IN). They finished the season at 23–8, the fourth-highest win total in school history to that point.

Coach John Longfellow's fifth team raced out of the gate, opening the season with 8 consecutive wins. They began conference play with a record of 8–1, the sole loss coming in the mid-season Mid-Western Tournament to Indiana Central. They placed 2nd in the Indiana Collegiate Conference title race and won the NAIA District 21 tourney, qualifying for the NAIA National Tournament.

== Post-season ==
In 1953, Longfellow's fifth basketball team finished second in the Indiana Collegiate Conference title, won the NAIA District 21 title and received an invitation to the National Association of Intercollegiate Basketball (NAIB) National Tournament in Kansas City; this was Longfellow's fourth trip to the National Tournament and the eighth for Indiana State. In Kansas City, the stormed into the National Quarterfinals winning their first three games by an average 26 points, scoring 100 or more in each game; they dropped the semifinal game to defending champion Southwest Missouri State but rallied for a win over East Texas State to finish 3rd Nationally. Southwest Missouri State would successfully defend their 1952 title; becoming the second time to win consecutive titles. The Sycamores were the top scoring team in the tourney, compiling a total of 458 pts, a 91.6 avg.

Dick Atha received several honors at the end of regular season. He was selected to the NAIA All-American team, the Helms Foundation All-American team and was named 1st team All-Indiana Collegiate Conference. Joining him on the all-conference team was Roger Adkins.

== Roster ==
The Sycamores were led by All-American Atha and Roger Adkins' with 14.9 averages. They were followed by Jim Crockom's 12.7 average. The starting lineup featured two future 1,000 career point scorers; Atha and Richardson. The roster also included a future well-known basketball coach in Indiana high circles, Basil Sfreddo - as the 6th man, Sfreddo would go on to coach the legendary George McGinnis at Indianapolis' George Washington High. Austin "Pete" Pritchett would go on to statewide fame as a girls high school coach, winning 2 IHSAA State Titles and was inducted into the Indiana Basketball Hall of Fame.

No.	Name	Position	Ht.	Year	Hometown
32	Sam Richardson	G	6–4	So.	South Bend, Indiana
33	Cliff Murray	F	6–2	Sr.	Elkhart, Indiana
34	Russell Blackburn	G	6–2	Fr.	Oolitic, Indiana
50	Dick Atha	G	6–2	Jr.	Otterbein, Indiana
54	Basil Sfreddo	F	6–2	Jr.	Bruceville, Indiana
55	Roger Adkins	G	6–0	Sr.	Martinsville, Indiana
56	Dale Smith	G	5–11	Jr.	Flora, Illinois
57	Jim Cox	G	5–11	So.	Winchester, Indiana
58	Tom Smith	C	6–4	Sr.	Huntingburg, Indiana
72	Jerry Ferguson	F	6–3	Sr.	Terre Haute, Indiana
73	Jim Crockum	F	6–4	Jr.	Ventura, California
74	Wayne Parker	G	6–3	So.	Robinson, Illinois
75	Charles Miller	F	6–3	Sr.	Louisville, Kentucky
76	Pete Pritchett	F	6–3	Fr.	Oolitic, Indiana
77	Dick Richmond	G	6–1	Fr.	Terre Haute, Indiana
81	Clarence Disney	F	6–2	S0.	Terre Haute, Indiana
82	Forrest Dunnuck	G	5–10	So.	Nappanee, Indiana
92	Dick Spear	C	6–8	So.	Monon, Indiana

Coaches

- Head coach John Longfellow - NAIA Champion and Hall of Fame coach
- Assistant coach - Paul Stemm

== Schedule and results ==
Date time, TV	Rank^{#}	Opponent^{#}	Result	Record	Site city, state
Regular Season
12/4/1952*		at Hanover College	W 61-53	1-0	Hanover, Indiana
12/6/1952*		at Concordia-St. Louis	W 57-51	2-0	Clayton, Missouri
12/9/1952*		at DePauw	W 61-58	3-0	Greencastle, Indiana
12/11/1952*		Oakland City College	W 86-59	4-0	ISTC Gymnasium; Terre Haute, Indiana
12/16/1952*		Eastern Illinois State	W 77-69	5-0	ISTC Gymnasium; Terre Haute, Indiana
12/18/1952		vs. Valparaiso	W 69-55	6-0	ISTC Gymnasium; Terre Haute, Indiana
12/27/1952*		Kansas Weleyan; Mid-West Tournament	W 106-75	7-0	ISTC Gymnasium; Terre Haute, Indiana
12/29/1978*		at Franklin College (IN); Mid-West Tournament	W 76-61	8-0	ISTC Gymnasium; Terre Haute, Indiana
12/30/1952*		Indiana Central College; Mid-West Tournament Finals	L 72-77	8-1	ISTC Gymnasium; Terre Haute, Indiana
1/8/1953*		DePauw	W 81-75	9-1	ISTC Gymnasium; Terre Haute, Indiana
1/10/1953		at Butler	L 64-78	9-2 (0-1)	Butler Fieldhouse; Indianapolis, Indiana
1/15/1953		Indiana State_Muncee	W 63-61	10-2 (2-1)	ISTC Gymnasium; Terre Haute, Indiana
1/17/1953		Evansville College	L 74-79	10-3 (2-2)	Evansville Armory; Evansville, Indiana
1/22/1953		St. Joseph’s (IN)	W 83-69	11-3 (3-2)	ISTC Gymnasium; Terre Haute, Indiana
1/24/1953		at Northern Illinois	L 64-72	11-4 (3-2)	DeKalb, Illinois
1/30/1953	No. 5	at Indiana State_Muncee	L 61-80	11-5 (3-3)	Ball Gymnasium; Muncee, Indiana
1/31/1953		at Valparaiso	W 75-67	12-5 (4-3)	Hilltop Gymnasium; Valparaiso, Indiana
2/5/1953		Evansville College	W 80-65	13-5 (5-3)	ISTC Gymnasium; Terre Haute, Indiana
2/7/1953		Manchester College	W 101-76	14-5 (5-3)	ISTC Gymnasium; Terre Haute, Indiana
2/10/1953	No. 2	at St. Joseph’s (IN)	L 53-57	14-6 (5-4)	Scharfman Fieldhouse; Rensselaer, Indiana
2/12/1953	No. 2	at Butler	W 56-51	15-6 (6-4)	ISTC Gymnasium; Terre Haute, Indiana
2/17/1953*		Eastern Illinois State	W 71-67	16-6 (6-4)	Health Education Building; Charleston, Illinois
2/21/1953*	No. 2	at Washington-St. Louis	W 63-58	17-6 (6-4)	ISTC Gymnasium; Terre Haute, Indiana
2/27/1953*		Southern Illinois	L 58-76	17-7 (6-4)	Davies Gym; Carbondale, Illinois
3/3/1953*		Indiana Central College; NAIA District 21 playoffs	W 87-64	18-7 (6-4)	ISTC Gymnasium; Terre Haute, Indiana
3/4/1953		Evansville College; NAIA District 21 playoffs	W 62-59	19-7 (6-4)	ISTC Gymnasium; Terre Haute, Indiana
3/9/1953*		Midwestern State (TX); NAIA Nationals – first round	W 100-76	20-7 (6-4)	Municipal Auditorium; Kansas City, Missouri
3/10/1953*		Arkansas Tech; NAIA Nationals – second round	W 100-82	21-7 (6-4)	Municipal Auditorium; Kansas City, Missouri
3/11/1953*		vs. Findlay College; NAIA Nationals – Elite Eight	W 106-70	22-7 (6-4)	Municipal Auditorium; Kansas City, Missouri
3/13/1953*		vs. Southwest Missouri State; NAIA National Semifinals	L 78-84	21-8 (6-4)	Municipal Auditorium; Kansas City, Missouri
3/14/1953*		vs. Eastern Texas; NAIA National Consolation Game	W 74-71	23-8 (6-4)	Municipal Auditorium; Kansas City, Missouri
*Non-conference game. ^{#}Rankings from AP Poll. (#) Tournament seedings in parentheses.

== Awards and honors ==
- Dick Atha - Consensus NAIA All-American teams
- Dick Atha – 1953 NAIA All-Tournament Team
