= 1948 NAIA basketball tournament =

College basketball tournament

1948 NAIA men's basketball tournament
- Teams: 32
- Finals site: Municipal Auditorium, Kansas City, Missouri
- Champions: Louisville (1st title, 1st title game, 1st Final Four)
- Runner-up: Indiana State (2nd title game, 2nd Final Four)
- Semifinalists: Hamline (3rd Final Four); Xavier (1st Final Four)
- MVP: Duane Klueh (Indiana State)
- Top scorer: Duane Klueh (Indiana State) (96 points)

The 1948 NAIA basketball tournament was held in March at Municipal Auditorium in Kansas City, Missouri. The 11th annual NAIA basketball tournament featured 32 teams playing in a single-elimination format.

The championship game featured Louisville beating Indiana State, 82–70.

The only school to have won national titles in both the NAIA and NCAA Division I is Louisville. Uniquely, Indiana State has finished as the National Runner-up in the NAIA (1946 and 1948), the NCAA Division I (1979) and the NCAA Division II (1968) tournaments. Indiana State won the NAIA in 1950.

The tournament was the first intercollegiate postseason to feature a black student-athlete, Clarence J. Walker of Indiana State under coach John Wooden. Wooden had withdrawn from the 1947 tournament because the NAIB would not allow Walker to play.

== Awards and honors ==
Many of the records set by the 1948 tournament have been broken, and many of the awards were established much later:

- Leading scorer est. 1963
- Leading rebounder est. 1963
- Charles Stevenson Hustle Award est. 1958
- Coach of the Year est. 1954
- Player of the Year est. 1994
- All-time scoring leader; second appearance: Harold Haskins, 12th, Hamline (Minn.) (1947,48,49,50), 14 games, 104 field goals, 72 free throws, 280 total points, 20.0 average per game.

== Bracket ==
First round	Second round
Marshall	72
Peru State	53
Marshall	72*
San Jose State	74
San Jose State	64
Iowa State Teachers	58
TOP TIER
Brigham Young	66
Delta State	61*
Brigham Young	68
Indiana State	82
Indiana State	72
St. Francis (PA)	40
Southern Illinois	54
Southern Oregon State	50
Southern Illinois	42
Manhattan	52
Manhattan	65
Arkansas State Teachers	60
TOP TIER
Gonzaga	46
Texas Wesleyan	45
Gonzaga	55
Hamline	70
Hamline	85
Mercer	41
Louisville	63
South Dakota State	60
Louisville	82
Emporia State	66
Emporia State	65
Loyola Maryland	57
BOTTOM TIER
Lawrence Tech	76
Appalachian State	48
Lawrence Tech	62
Beloit	78
Beloit	84
East Central State	60
Connecticut Teachers	63
Montana	52
Connecticut Teachers	35
Xavier	57
Xavier (OH)	67
Northwestern State (LA)	43
BOTTOM TIER
Mankato State	49
Denver	46
Mankato State	54
Arizona State-Tempe	53
Arizona State-Tempe	68
NE Missouri State	66

Elite Eight
San Jose State	52
Indiana State	59
Manhattan	51
Hamline	60
Louisville	85
Beloit	76
Xavier	63
Mankato State	50

NAIA national semifinals
Indiana State	66
Hamline	65*
Louisville	56
Xavier	49

NAIA national championship
Indiana State	70
Louisville	82
NAIA third-place game
Hamline	59
Xavier	58

- * denotes overtime.

== See also ==
- 1948 NCAA basketball tournament
- 1948 National Invitation Tournament
