= 1953 NAIA basketball tournament =

College basketball tournament

1953 NAIA men's basketball tournament
- Season: 1952–53
- Teams: 32
- Finals site: Municipal Auditorium; Kansas City, Missouri
- Champions: Southwest Missouri State (2nd title, 2nd title game, 2nd Final Four)
- Runner-up: Hamline (4th title game, 6th Final Four)
- Semifinalists: Indiana State (5th Final Four); East Texas State (1st Final Four)
- MVP: Jerry Anderson (Southwest Missouri State)

The 1953 NAIA basketball tournament was held in March at Municipal Auditorium in Kansas City, Missouri. The 16th annual NAIA basketball tournament featured 32 teams playing in a single-elimination format.

The championship game would feature Southwest Missouri State, now Missouri State University, and Hamline (10th appearance in tournament). The Bears were coached by Bob Vanatta. The championship game was the first time that these two teams had ever met in the tournament. The Bears would defeat the Pipers to win another national championship, 79–71.

It was the first time since 1937 and 1938, the first two years of the tournament, that the same team would win the national championship title. (The first two tournaments were also won by a Missouri university, Central Missouri State.)

Playing for third place were Indiana State and East Texas State, now Texas A&M University–Commerce. It was the first time that these two teams had played each other. The Sycamores defeated the Lions by a score of 74 to 71.

The 1953 tournament would be Hamline's first, and only, second place title as well as Indiana State's first, and only, third place title, making them the first two schools to win, outright, first, second, third, and fourth places in the NAIA tournament (Georgetown (KY) the only other school to have that honor).

It is the last year without the Coach of the Year Award. 1953 is the first tournament to feature a Nazarene University (Pasadena, now Point Loma Nazarene). Perennial staples to the tournament, only a handful of years have been absence of a Nazarene University playing. There were two games in which all-time top performances would be recorded.

== Awards and honors ==
Many of the records set by the 1953 tournament have been broken, and many of the awards were established much later:

- Leading Scorer Award est. 1963
- Leading Rebounder Award est. 1963
- Charles Stevenson Hustle Award est. 1958
- Coach of the Year est. 1954
- Player of the Year est. 1994
- Top single-game performances: 3rd Harold Wolfe of Findlay (Ohio) playing against Pasadena (Calif.) scored 25 field goals and 4 free throws totaling 54 points for one game. Findlay won the game.
- Top single-game performances: 22nd Pete Kinkead of Geneva (Pa.) playing against Tennessee State, scored 14 field goals and 15 free throws totaling 43 points for one game. Geneva did not win the game.
- All-time scoring leader; first appearance: James Miller, 18th, East Texas State (1953,54,55), 13 games, 103 field goals, 40 free throws, totaling 246 points, 18.9 average per game.
- All-time scoring leader; second appearance: E.C. O’Neal, 9th, Arkansas Tech (1952,53,54,55), 13 games, 122 field goals, 43 free throws, totaling 287 points, 22.1 average per game.
- All-time scoring leaders; final appearance: Lloyd Thorgaard, 10th, Hamline (Minn.) (1950,51,52,53), 15 games, 111 field goals, 61 free throws, 283 total points, 18.9 average per game; James Fritsche, 14th, Hamline (Minn.) (1950,51,52,53), 15 games, 113 field goals, 46 free throws, 272 total points, 18.1 average per game.

== Bracket ==
First round	Second round
Eastern Illinois State	84
Morris Harvey	67
Eastern Illinois State	86
Hamline	88
Hamline	89
Louisiana Tech	80
TOP TIER
Mississippi Southern	106
River Falls State	72
Mississippi Southern	94
Loyola (Md.)	83
Loyola Maryland	66
Portland	64
East Texas State	57
Adrian	40
East Texas State	85
St. Peter's	68
St. Peter's	81
Southwestern State (OK)	60
TOP TIER
St. Benedict's (KS)	69
North Dakota	66
St. Benedict's	56
Tennessee A&I State	79
Tennessee A&I State	89
Geneva	88
SW Missouri State	95
Gonzaga	74
Southwest Missouri State	98
Stetson	71
Stetson	75
State College of Iowa	57
BOTTOM TIER
Nebraska Wesleyan	83
Arnold	62
Nebraska Wesleyan	83
Arizona State-Tempe	71
Arizona State-Tempe	81
East Tennessee State	79
Pasadena	107
Ricks	72
Pasadena	93
Findlay	96
Findlay	80
Adams State	63
BOTTOM TIER
Arkansas Tech	85
East Carolina	81
Arkansas Tech	81
Indiana State	100
Midwestern	76
Indiana State	100

Elite Eight
Hamline	102
Mississippi Southern	92
East Texas State	72
Tennessee A&I State	67
Southwest Missouri State	78
Nebraska Wesleyan	74
Findlay	70
Indiana State	106

NAIA national semifinals
Hamline	73
East Texas State	71
Southwest Missouri State	84
Indiana State	78

NAIA national championship
Hamline	71
Southwest Missouri State	79
NAIA third-place game
East Texas State	71
Indiana State	74

== See also ==
- 1953 NCAA basketball tournament
- 1953 National Invitation Tournament
