= Mush Torson =

James Mariel "Mush" Torson (October 17, 1907 – September 20, 1986) was the head men's basketball coach of the University of Portland from 1946 to 1954, leading the Pilots to five post-season tournaments and an overall record of 141–109.

A native of Berkeley, California, Torson graduated from Oregon State College in 1931, and was the boys' basketball coach at Grant High School in Portland, Oregon from 1937 to 1946 before being hired by the University of Portland on March 1, 1946.

Torson has been elected to the Oregon Sports Hall of Fame, the Portland Interscholastic League Hall of Fame, and the Grant High School Athletic Hall of Fame.
