= Howard Hall (Portland, Oregon) =

Arena in Portland, Oregon, U.S.

- Location within Portland, Oregon Location within Oregon Location within the United States
- Location: University Park, Portland, Oregon
- Coordinates: 45.575°N 122.728°W
- Owner: University of Portland

Construction
- Groundbreaking: November 20, 1927
- Built: 1927–1928
- Opened: February 19, 1928
- Closed: 2015
- Demolished: 2017

Tenant
- Portland Pilots (NCAA) (1928–1984)

Howard Hall was a multi-purpose gymnasium in Portland, Oregon, United States. The arena opened in 1928. It was home to the University of Portland Pilots men's and women's basketball teams until 1984, then continued to serve as the university's student gymnasium for three decades more.

== History ==
Construction on the gymnasium began in 1927, and the facility was opened in 1928. It was named after Roman Catholic Archbishop Edward Howard, who was then the bishop of the diocese of Portland, Oregon.

== See also ==
- List of sports venues in Portland, Oregon
- List of NCAA Division I basketball arenas
