= 1950 NAIA basketball tournament =

College basketball tournament

1950 NAIA men's basketball tournament
- Season: 1949–50
- Teams: 32
- Finals site: Municipal Auditorium; Kansas City, Missouri
- Champions: Indiana State (1st title, 3rd title game, 4th Final Four)
- Runner-up: East Central State (1st title game, 1st Final Four)
- Semifinalists: Central Methodist (1st Final Four); Tampa (1st Final Four)
- MVP: Clemens "Lenny" Rzeszewski (Indiana State)

The 1950 NAIA basketball tournament was held in March at Municipal Auditorium in Kansas City, Missouri. The 13th annual NAIA basketball tournament featured 32 teams playing in a single-elimination format.

The championship game featured Indiana State and East Central State. It was the first time these two teams had met in the tournament history. The Sycamores defeated the Tigers, 61-57.

This would be Indiana State's highest finish in their 12 career appearances in the NAIA tournament. Winning the championship puts them in a unique group to place 1st, 2nd, 3rd, and 4th. Also Indiana State finally gets a win after 2 times as runner-up. Uniquely, Indiana State has finished as the National Runner-up in the NAIA (1946 and 1948), the NCAA Division I (1979) and the NCAA Division II (1968) tournaments.

== Awards and honors ==
Many of the records set by the 1950 tournament have been broken, and many of the awards were established much later:

- Leading scorer est. 1963
- Leading rebounder est. 1963
- Charles Stevenson Hustle Award est. 1958
- All-Tournament Team: Len Rzeszewski, Dan Dimich, Don McDonald - Indiana State; Stacey Howell, Claude Overton - East Central (Okla)
- Coach of the Year est. 1954
- Player of the Year est. 1994
- All-time scoring leaders; first appearance: Lloyd Thorgaard, 10th, Hamline (Minn.) (1950,51,52,53), 15 games, 111 field goals, 61 free throws, 283 total points, 18.9 average per game; James Fritsche, 14th, Hamline (Minn.) (1950,51,52,53), 15 games, 113 field goals, 46 free throws, 272 total points, 18.1 average per game.
- All-time scoring leader; final appearance: Harold Haskins, 12th, Hamline (Minn.) (1947,48,49,50), 14 games, 104 field goals, 72 free throws, 280 total points, 20.0 average per game.

== Bracket ==
First round	Second round
Hamline	74
Regis	66
Hamline	66
Central College	76
Central (MO)	68
Peru State	59
TOP TIER
Portland	48
Montana	47
Portland	43
Central Washington State	51
Central Washington State	61
Murray State	55
Brooklyn	79
Appalachian State	75
Brooklyn	64
Puget Sound	47
Puget Sound	70
Southeastern Louisiana	68*
TOP TIER
East Central State (OK)	70
Kansas Wesleyan	68
East Central State	75
River Falls State	64
River Falls State)	80
Eastern Illinois State	68
Westminster (PA)	70
Connecticut Teachers	62
Westminster	75
Davis & Elkins	85
Davis & Elkins	79
St. Thomas (MN)	55
BOTTOM TIER
Tampa	85
New Mexico A&M	75
Tampa	69
Pepperdine	61
Pepperdine	54
American	53
East Texas State	55
South Dakota	54
East Texas State	62
Baldwin-Wallace	82
Baldwin-Wallace	84
Kalamazoo	83
BOTTOM TIER
Arkansas Tech	75
Morningside	74
Arkansas Tech	79
Indiana State	87
Indiana State	65
Delta State	59

Elite Eight
Central College	65
Central Washington State	55
Brooklyn	52
East Central State	84
Davis & Elkins	69
Tampa	81
Baldwin-Wallace	39
Indiana State	61

NAIA national semifinals
Central College	54
East Central State	57
Tampa	69
Indiana State	73

NAIA national championship
East Central State	57
Indiana State	61
NAIA third-place game
Central College	80
Tampa	67

- * Denotes overtime.

== See also ==
- 1950 NCAA basketball tournament
- 1950 National Invitation Tournament
