= Lenny Rzeszewski =

American basketball player and coach

Personal information
- Born: November 6, 1923 South Bend, Indiana, U.S.
- Died: November 7, 2013 (aged 90) New Carlisle, Indiana, U.S.
- Listed height: 6 ft 1 in (1.85 m)
- Listed weight: 185 lb (84 kg)

Career information
- High school: South Bend Central (South Bend, Indiana)
- College: Indiana State (1946–1950)
- NBA draft: 1950: 4th round, 40th overall pick
- Drafted by: Fort Wayne Pistons
- Position: Guard

Career highlights
- NAIA All-American (1949); NAIA tournament MVP (1950)
- Stats at Basketball Reference

Clemens L. "Lenny" Rzeszewski (November 6, 1923 – November 7, 2013) was an American college basketball player and, later, a high school coach.

== High school career ==
Lenny Rzeszewski attended South Bend Central High School in South Bend, Indiana where he played for John Wooden. In 1941, his senior year, Rzeszewski was member of the school team that went 26–3, and would reach the semistate championship game, where they fell to Gary Froebel High School by one point.

== College career ==
After high school, Lenny attended Indiana State University, located in Terre Haute, Indiana. He played basketball under head coach John Wooden and John Longfellow; he finished his career with 1,175 points. He helped lead the Sycamores to three consecutive IIC Championships and three NAIB (now NAIA) Tournaments. He was a member of the "South Bend Shuttle," as he and four fellow South Bend products — Jim Powers, Dan Dimich, Bob Brady and Bill Jagodzinski all played at Indiana State. These players led the Sycamores to a record of 95-31 (.754); a 30-4 (.882) in IIC play, including 4 conference titles, the 1950 NAIB National Title; the 1948 NAIB National Title-game and the 1949 NAIB National Title-final four during their four seasons of varsity play. In 1950, his senior season, Lenny led the Sycamores to the NAIB National Title; he was named the Chuck Taylor Award winner and to the All-Tourney team as the Sycamores clinched the National Title.

== Post-college ==
Rzeszewski was selected as the 40th overall pick in the fourth round of the 1950 NBA draft by the Fort Wayne Pistons. He did not appear in a game but returned to in his hometown and embarked on a successful high school coaching career in basketball, baseball and cross-country. He was the head coach at South Bend James Whitcomb Riley High from 1958 to 1964 where he amassed a record of 52–77. Coach Rzeszewski was also a successful Baseball Coach at South Bend LaSalle for several years and in 1984 they were ranked number 1 heading into sectional play.
