= Bob Royer =

American basketball player

Personal information
- Born: October 15, 1927 Brazil, Indiana, U.S.
- Died: May 30, 1973 (aged 45) Lafayette, Indiana, U.S.
- Listed height: 5 ft 10 in (1.78 m)
- Listed weight: 155 lb (70 kg)

Career information
- High school: Bowling Green (Bowling Green, Indiana)
- College: Indiana State (1946–1949)
- NBA draft: 1949: 8th round, –
- Drafted by: Providence Steamrollers
- Playing career: 1949–1950
- Position: Guard
- Number: 23

Career history
- 1949–1950: Denver Nuggets

Career highlights
- NAIA All-American (1949)

Career NBA statistics
- Points: 197 (4.7 ppg)
- Assists: 85 (2.0 apg)
- Stats at NBA.com
- Stats at Basketball Reference

Robert Dee Royer (October 15, 1927 – May 30, 1973) was an American professional basketball player. Royer was selected in the eighth round in the 1949 BAA Draft by the Providence Steamrollers. He played for the Denver Nuggets in 1949–50 before ending his NBA career after one season.

== Playing career ==
Royer attended Bowling Green High School in Bowling Green, Indiana. While at Indiana State University, Royer was a 3-year letterman for the Sycamores, helping the team reach the NAIB Finals, finishing as National Finalist in 1946 and 1948 and 4th place in 1949. He was named to the All-Tourney team in each of those Tourneys. During his collegiate career, the Sycamores recorded a record of 72-22 (.766), won three IIC titles and three NAIA District titles.

Royer played for Glenn M. Curtis as a freshman, the legendary John Wooden as a sophomore and junior, and John Longfellow during his senior season in 1949.

Royer is scored 1,173 points during his collegiate career; he was named the Most Valuable Player of the 1948-49 Midwest Collegiate Basketball Tournament.

== Later life and death ==
After his basketball career, Royer worked as a real estate salesman and investment counsellor. He also coached basketball at high schools in Indiana.

On May 29, 1973, Royer went to the workplace of Elizabeth Darling, a woman he had been having an affair with, and shot her to death with two guns. Royer had wanted her to marry him and threatened her when she rejected him. Royer fled the scene, and on the next day, he committed suicide next to his car with a shotgun blast to his chest.

== Career statistics ==
Legend
GP	Games played	GS	Games started	MPG	Minutes per game
FG%	Field goal percentage	3P%	3-point field goal percentage	FT%	Free throw percentage
RPG	Rebounds per game	APG	Assists per game	SPG	Steals per game
BPG	Blocks per game	PPG	Points per game	**Bold**	Career high

=== NBA ===
==== Regular season ====
Year	Team	GP	FG%	FT%	APG	PPG
1949–50	Denver	42	.338	.707	2.0	4.7
