= 1949 NAIA basketball tournament =

College basketball tournament

1949 NAIA men's basketball tournament
- Season: 1948–49
- Teams: 32
- Finals site: Municipal Auditorium; Kansas City, Missouri
- Champions: Hamline (2nd title, 2nd title game, 4th Final Four)
- Runner-up: Regis (1st title game, 1st Final Four)
- Semifinalists: Beloit (1st Final Four); Indiana State (3rd Final Four)
- MVP: Hal Haskins (Hamline)

The 1949 NAIA basketball tournament was held in March at Municipal Auditorium in Kansas City, Missouri. The 12th annual NAIA basketball tournament featured 32 teams playing in a single-elimination format.

The championship game featured Hamline defeating Regis, 57–46.

Hamline's championship win would make them the first team to win two non-consecutive tournaments (1942, and 1949). Regis, in their first tournament appearance, would finish as the National Runner-Up, but it would be the highest finish Regis would ever see of the 5 tournament appearances. Regis would make it back to the NAIA Semifinals in 1951, only to finish in fourth place.

== Awards and honors ==
Many of the records set by the 1949 tournament have been broken, and many of the awards were established much later:

- Leading scorer est. 1963
- Leading rebounder est. 1963
- Charles Stevenson Hustle Award est. 1958
- Coach of the Year est. 1954
- Player of the Year est. 1994
- All-time scoring leader; third appearance: Harold Haskins, 12th, Hamline (Minn.) (1947,48,49,50), 14 games, 104 field goals, 72 free throws, 280 total points, 20.0 average per game.

== Bracket ==
First round	Second round
Hamline	76
Arkansas State	43
Hamline	83
Indiana Central	66
Indiana Central	72
Connecticut Teachers	59
TOP TIER
Texas Tech	79
Western Montana	43
Texas Tech	62
North Dakota	57
North Dakota	70
Hawaii	53
SW Missouri State	59
Portland	56
SW Missouri State	47
Beloit	66
Beloit	96
Waynesburg	56
TOP TIER
Eastern Illinois State	89
Miami (FL)	73
Eastern Illinois State	81
San Jose State	75
San Jose State	63
Lawrence Tech	52
Loyola Maryland	79
Cedarville	67
Loyola Maryland	58
Indiana State	78
Indiana State	60
Eastern New Mexico	42
BOTTOM TIER
Iowa State Teachers	65
River Falls State	64
Iowa State Teachers	49
Emporia State	63
Emporia State	67
Delta State	57
Regis	71
Erskine	47
Regis	53
St. Thomas (MN)	52
St. Thomas (MN)	74
Peru State	44
BOTTOM TIER
Northwestern State (LA)	70
Puget Sound	58
Northwestern State (LA)	59
Brigham Young	57
Brigham Young	79
Northwestern State (OK)	50

Elite Eight
Hamline	80
Texas Tech	56
Beloit	65
Eastern Illinois State	64
Indiana State	67
Emporia State	66
Regis	56
Northwestern State (LA)	51

NAIA national semifinals
Hamline	52
Beloit	43
Indiana State	45**
Regis	48

NAIA national championship
Hamline	57
Regis	46
NAIA third-place game
Beloit	67
Indiana State	59

- * denotes each overtime.

== See also ==
- 1949 NCAA basketball tournament
- 1949 National Invitation Tournament
