= Phoenix Suns draft history =

The draft history of the Phoenix Suns.

== Key ==
Abbreviation	Meaning	Abbreviation	Meaning
G	Guard	PG	Point guard
SG	Shooting guard	F	Forward
SF	Small forward	PF	Power forward
C	Center		

Naismith Basketball Hall of Famer	First overall NBA draft pick	Selected for an NBA All-Star Game

== Selections ==
Year	Round	Pick	Name	Nationality	Position	From
1968	1	8	Gary Gregor	United States		South Carolina
1968	2	21	Dick Cunningham	United States		Murray State
1968	3	36	Art Beatty			American
1968	4	49	Rich Jones	United States		Memphis State
1968	5	64	Harry Holines			Denver
1968	6	77	Rod Knowles			Davidson
1968	7	92	Charles Parks			Idaho State
1968	8	105	Brian Clare			Denver
1968	9	120	Merv Jackson	United States		Utah
1968	10	133	Lee Davis	United States		North Carolina Central
1968	11	147	Ron Boone	United States		Idaho State
1968	12	160	Bill Davis			Arizona
1968	13	171	Pat Hobart			California (Pennsylvania)
1969	1	2	Neal Walk	United States		Florida
1969	2	23	Gene Williams			Kansas State
1969	3	30	Floyd Kerr			Colorado State
1969	3	33	Lamar Green			Morehead State
1969	3	39	Lloyd Kerr			Colorado State
1969	4	44	Dennis Stewart			Michigan
1969	5	58	Rich Jones	United States		Michigan
1969	6	72	Dan Sadlier			Dayton
1969	7	86	Bill Sweek			UCLA
1969	8	100	Bob Edwards			Arizona State
1969	9	114	Steve Jennings			USC
1969	10	128	Rick Abrahamson			Oregon
1969	11	142	Fred Lind			Duke
1969	12	156	Bob Miller			Toledo
1969	13	169	Andy White			UTEP
1969	14	180	Marv Schmidt			Western New Mexico
1969	15	189	Bob Beamon	United States		UTEP
1969	16	195	Wayne Huckel			Davidson
1969	17	201	Howie Dickenman (Note: Listed as Howie Dickerman in the 1968 draft.)			Central Connecticut State
1969	18	207	Al Nuness			Minnesota
1969	19	212	Bill Davis			Kentucky State
1969	20	216	Jim Plump			Northern Arizona
1970	1	10	Greg Howard			New Mexico
1970	2	27	Fred Taylor	United States		Texas-Pan American
1970	2	29	Joe DePre			St. John's
1970	3	44	Greg McDivitt			Ohio
1970	3	48	Vann Williford	United States		North Carolina State
1970	4	61	Bob Lienhard	United States		Georgia
1970	5	78	John Canine			Ohio
1970	6	95	Joe Thomas	United States		Marquette
1970	7	112	Heyward Dotson			Columbia
1970	8	129	Steve Patterson	United States		UCLA
1970	9	146	Carl Ashley			Wyoming
1970	10	163	Gerhardus Schreur			Arizona State
1970	11	178	Jim Walls			Clark College
1970	12	190	Ric Cobb			Marquette
1970	13	200	Fred Carpenter			Hawaii
1970	14	210	Chad Calabria			Iowa
1970	15	219	Walt Williams			Miami (OH)
1971	1	14	John Roche			South Carolina
1971	3	48	Dennis Layton			USC
1971	4	65	Walter Szczerbiak			George Washington
1971	5	82	Ken Gardner			Utah
1971	5	84	Bob Kissane			Holy Cross
1971	6	99	William Graham			Kentucky State
1971	7	116	Ralph Brateris			Trenton State
1971	8	133	Vernell Ellzy			Florida State
1971	9	149	Mike Johnson			Kansas State
1971	10	165	Tom Newell			Hawaii
1971	11	179	Paul Leitz			Western Carolina
1971	12	192	Floyd Mason			Alcorn State
1971	13	204	Ron Dorsey			Tennessee State
1971	14	213	Ken Booker			UCLA
1971	15	222	Curtis Carter			Bishop College
1972	1	4	Corky Calhoun			Pennsylvania
1972	3	33	Scott English			UTEP
1972	3	34	Don Buse			Evansville
1972	3	42	Claude Terry			Stanford
1972	4	59	Matt Gantt			St. Bonaventure
1972	5	75	Wardell Dyson			Shaw College
1972	6	92	Charles Edge			Le Moyne
1972	7	109	Bernie Fryer			Brigham Young
1972	8	125	Russell Golden			Jackson State
1972	9	140	Bill Kennedy			Arizona State
1972	10	153	Al Vilchek			Louisville
1972	11	164	John Belcher			Arkansas State
1972	12	172	Mark Soderberg			Utah
1972	13	179	Kelly Utley			Shaw College
1972	14	186	Ray Golson			West Texas State
1973	1	8	Mike Bantom			St. Joseph's
1973	2	33	Gary Melchionni			Duke
1973	3	42	Joe Reaves			Bethel
1973	3	43	Steve Mitchell			Kansas State
1973	4	60	Ronnie Robinson			Memphis State
1973	5	77	Clinton Harris			Iowa State
1973	6	94	Gene Doyle			Holy Cross
1973	7	111	Jerry Bisbano			Southwest Louisiana
1973	8	128	Jim Owens			Arizona State
1973	9	144	Sandy Smith			Winston-Salem
1973	10	158	Claude White			Elmhurst College
1973	11	170	Lynn Greer			Virginia State College
1973	12	179	Lyman Williamson			Samford College
1973	13	186	Kalevi Sarkalahti	Finland		Brigham Young
1974	1	4	John Shumate			Notre Dame
1974	2	31	Fred Saunders			Syracuse
1974	3	40	George Gervin			Eastern Michigan
1974	3	49	Earl Williams			Winston-Salem
1974	4	58	Randy Allen			Indiana (PA)
1974	5	76	Ralph Bobik			Creighton
1974	6	94	Collis Temple			LSU
1974	7	112	Clyde Dickey			Boise State
1974	8	130	Tom Holland			Oklahoma
1974	9	148	Ted Evans			Oklahoma
1974	10	165	Mark Wasley			Arizona State
1975	1	4	Alvan Adams			Oklahoma
1975	1	16	Ricky Sobers			UNLV
1975	2	35	Allen Murphy			Louisville
1975	2	36	Jimmy Dan Conner			Kentucky
1975	3	54	Bayard Forrest			Grand Canyon
1975	4	58	Sam McCants			Oral Roberts
1975	5	76	Joe Pace			Coppin State
1975	6	94	Biff Burrell			USC
1975	7	112	Dave Edmunds			West Georgia
1975	8	130	Jack Schrader			Arizona State
1975	9	147	Owen Brown			Maryland
1975	10	163	Mike Moon			Arizona State
1976	1	10	Ron Lee			Oregon
1976	2	30	Al Fleming			Arizona
1976	2	33	Butch Feher			Vanderbilt
1976	3	45	Ira Terrell			Southern Methodist
1976	4	62	Paul Miller			Oregon State
1976	5	79	Ralph Walker			St. Mary's (CA)
1976	6	97	Carl Brown			Eastern Kentucky
1976	7	115	Brad Warble			Eastern Illinois
1976	8	133	Tom DeBerry			Northern Arizona
1976	9	150	John Irving			Hofstra
1976	10	166	Gary Jackson			Arizona State
1977	1	5	Walter Davis			North Carolina
1977	3	66	Mike Bratz			Stanford
1977	4	71	Greg Griffin			Idaho State
1977	5	93	Cecil Rellford			St. John's
1977	6	115	Billy McKinney			Northwestern
1977	7	136	Alvin Scott			Oral Roberts
1977	8	156	Alvin Joseph			Oral Roberts
1978	1	19	Marty Byrnes			Syracuse
1978	3	63	Joel Kramer			San Diego State
1978	4	85	Bob Miller			Cincinnati
1978	4	88	Wayne Smith			UC-Irvine
1978	5	107	Andre Wakefield			Loyola-Chicago
1978	6	128	Charles Thompson			Houston
1978	7	149	Steve Malovic			San Diego State
1978	8	167	George Fowler			Pacific
1978	9	184	Nate Stokes			Grand Canyon
1978	10	199	Lewis Cohen		PG	Cal Poly
1979	1	22	Kyle Macy			Kentucky
1979	2	24	Johnny High			Nevada-Reno
1979	3	64	Al Green	United States; Australia		LSU
1979	4	86	Malcolm Cesare			Florida
1979	5	107	Mark Eaton			Cypress JC
1979	6	127	Dale Shackelford			Syracuse
1979	7	147	Ollie Matson			Pepperdine
1979	8	165	Charles Jones			Albany State
1979	9	196	Hosea Champine			Robert Morris (PA)
1979	10	215	Korky Nelson			Santa Clara
1980	2	42	Kimberly Belton			Stanford
1980	3	59	John Campbell			Clemson
1980	3	65	Doug True			UC-Berkeley
1980	4	88	Leroy Stampley			Loyola-Illinois
1980	5	111	Mark Stevens			Northern Arizona
1980	6	134	Coby Leavitt			Utah
1980	7	157	Ron Williams	United States		Western Montana
1980	8	175	Jim Connolly			La Salle
1980	9	196	Keith French			North Park
1980	10	211	Randy Carroll			Kansas
1981	1	20	Larry Nance	United States		Clemson
1981	3	62	Sam Clancy			Pittsburgh
1981	3	66	Craig Dykema			Long Beach State
1981	5	112	Paul Heuerman			Michigan
1981	6	135	Pete Harris	United States		Northeastern
1981	7	158	David Williams	United States		Southern
1981	8	180	Steve Risley			Indiana
1981	9	200	Brian Johnson			Colorado
1981	10	220	Felton Sealey			Oregon
1982	1	15	David Thirdkill	United States		Bradley
1982	2	39	Kevin Magee	United States		UC-Irvine
1982	3	61	Charles Pittman	United States		Maryland
1982	4	86	Rory White	United States		South Alabama
1982	5	108	Marvin McCrary			Missouri
1982	6	130	Jake Bethany			Hardin Simmons
1982	7	155	Phil Ward			UNC-Charlotte
1982	8	177	Rick Elrod			Georgetown (KY)
1982	9	199	Ken Lyles			Washington
1982	10	221	Dale Wilkinson	United States		Idaho State
1983	2	28	Rod Foster	United States		UCLA
1983	2	45	Paul Williams			Arizona State
1983	3	51	Dereck Whittenburg			N.C. State
1983	4	89	Sam Mosley			Nevada-Reno
1983	5	113	Rick Lamb			Illinois State
1983	6	135	Edward Bona			Fordham
1983	7	159	Fred Brown	United States		Virginia Comm.
1983	8	181	Mike Mulquin			Villanova
1983	9	204	Joe Dykstra			Western Illinois
1983	10	224	Bo Overton	United States		Oklahoma
1984	1	13	Jay Humphries	United States		Colorado
1984	2	36	Charles Jones	United States		Louisville
1984	3	59	Murray Jarman			Clemson
1984	4	82	Jeff Collins			UNLV
1984	5	105	Bill Flye			Richmond
1984	6	128	Herman Veal			Maryland
1984	7	151	Raymond Crenshaw			Oklahoma State
1984	8	174	Mark Fothergill			Maryland
1984	9	196	Buddy Cox			Bellarmine
1984	10	218	Ezra Hill			Liberty Baptist
1985	1	10	Ed Pinckney	United States		Villanova
1985	2	32	Nick Vanos	United States		Santa Clara
1985	3	56	Jerry Everett			Lamar
1985	4	78	Granger Hall	United States		Temple
1985	5	102	Shawn Campbell			Weber State
1985	6	124	Charles Rayne			Temple
1985	7	148	Georgi Glouchkov	Bulgaria		Akademik Varna (Bulgaria)
1986	1	6	William Bedford	United States		Memphis State
1986	2	31	Joe Ward	United States		Dayton
1986	2	39	Rafael Addison	United States		Syracuse
1986	2	46	Jeff Hornacek	United States		Iowa State
1986	3	55	Kenny Gattison	United States		Old Dominion
1986	4	77	Grant Gondrezick	United States		Pepperdine
1986	5	101	Greg Spurling			Carson-Newman
1986	6	123	Jim McCaffrey			Holy Cross
1986	7	147	Damon Goodwin			Dayton
1987	1	2	Armon Gilliam	United States		UNLV
1987	2	46	Bruce Dalrymple			Georgia Tech
1987	3	53	Winston Crite	United States		Texas A&M
1987	4	76	Steve Beck	United States		Arizona State
1987	5	99	Brent Counts			Pacific
1987	6	122	Marcel Boyce			Akron
1987	7	145	Ron Singleton			Grand Canyon University
1988	1	7	Tim Perry	United States		Temple
1988	1	14	Dan Majerle	United States		Central Michigan
1988	2	28	Andrew Lang	United States		Arkansas
1988	2	38	Dean Garrett	United States		Indiana
1988	2	50	Steve Kerr	United States		Arizona
1988	3	55	Rodney Johns			Grand Canyon
1989	1	24	Anthony Cook (Note: Cook traded to Detroit for Kenny Battle (#27 overall pick) and Micheal Williams)	United States		Arizona
1989	2	46	Ricky Blanton	United States		LSU
1989	2	51	Mike Morrison			Loyola Marymount
1989	2	52	Greg Grant	United States		Trenton State
1990	1	21	Jayson Williams	United States		St. John's
1990	2	31	Negele Knight	United States		Dayton
1990	2	48	Cedric Ceballos	United States		Cal State Fullerton
1990	2	50	Miloš Babić (Note: Traded to Cleveland for Stefano Rusconi.)	Yugoslavia (now Serbia)		Tennessee Tech
1991	2	32	Chad Gallagher	United States		Creighton
1991	2	46	Richard Dumas	United States		Oklahoma State
1991	2	50	Joey Wright	United States		Texas
1992	1	22	Oliver Miller	United States		Arkansas
1992	2	48	Brian Davis	United States		Duke
1992	2	49	Ron Ellis			Louisiana Tech
1993	1	27	Malcolm Mackey	United States		Georgia Tech
1993	2	49	Mark Buford			Mississippi Valley State
1993	2	54	Byron Wilson			Utah
1994	1	23	Wesley Person	United States		Auburn
1994	2	29	Antonio Lang	United States		Duke
1994	2	50	Charles Claxton	United States		Georgia
1994	2	52	Anthony Goldwire	United States		Houston
1995	1	21	Michael Finley	United States		Wisconsin
1995	1	27	Mario Bennett	United States		Arizona State
1995	2	56	Chris Carr	United States		Southern Illinois
1996	1	15	Steve Nash	Canada		Santa Clara
1996	2	39	Russ Millard	United States		Iowa
1996	2	43	Ben Davis	United States		Arizona
1997	2	42	Stephen Jackson	United States		Oak Hill High School (VA)
1999	1	9	Shawn Marion	United States		UNLV
2000	1	25	Iakovos "Jake" Tsakalidis	Greece; Georgia		AEK Athens (Greece)
2001	2	51	Alton Ford	United States		Houston
2002	1	9	Amaré Stoudemire	United States		Cypress Creek High School (FL)
2002	1	22	Casey Jacobsen	United States		Stanford
2003	1	17	Žarko Čabarkapa	Serbia and Montenegro (now Serbia & Montenegro)		Budućnost Podgorica (Serbia & Montenegro)
2004	1	7	Luol Deng (Note: Traded to Chicago for Jackson Vroman, cash and a 2005 first round pick (Nate Robinson was later selected).)	Sudan (now South Sudan (Note: Luol Deng was born in the city of Wau, which at the time of the draft was a part of Sudan. Wau became a part of South Sudan when South Sudan decided to declare for independence in 2011.)); United Kingdom	SF	Duke
2005	1	21	Nate Robinson (Note: Traded to New York with Quentin Richardson and future considerations for Kurt Thomas and the draft rights to Dijon Thompson.)	United States	PG	Washington
2005	2	57	Marcin Gortat	Poland	C	RheinEnergie Köln (Germany)
2006	1	21	Rajon Rondo (Note: With Brian Grant to Boston Celtics for a 2007 first round pick (Rudy Fernández was later selected).)	United States	PG	Kentucky
2006	1	27	Sergio Rodríguez (Note: With James Jones to Portland Trail Blazers for cash.)	Spain	PG	Adecco Estudiantes (Spain)
2007	1	24	Rudy Fernández (Note: On June 28, 2006, Phoenix acquired Cleveland's 2007 first-round draft pick from Boston in exchange for Brian Grant, the draft rights to Rajon Rondo and cash considerations. Previously, Boston acquired a 2007 first-round draft pick on February 24, 2005 from Cleveland in exchange for Jiří Welsch. Phoenix used the 24th pick to draft Rudy Fernández.) (Note: Portland acquired James Jones and the draft rights to 24th pick Rudy Fernández from Phoenix in exchange for cash considerations. The trade was finalized on July 11, 2007.)	Spain	G	Joventut Badalona (Spain)
2007	1	29	Alando Tucker	United States	F	Wisconsin
2007	2	59	D. J. Strawberry	United States	G	Maryland
2008	1	15	Robin Lopez (Note: On August 19, 2005, Phoenix acquired 2006 and 2008 first-round draft picks and Boris Diaw from Atlanta in exchange for Joe Johnson. Phoenix used the pick to draft Robin Lopez.)	United States	F	Stanford
2008	2	48	Malik Hairston (Note: San Antonio acquired the draft rights to 48th pick Malik Hairston, a second-round draft pick in 2009, and cash considerations from Phoenix in exchange for the draft rights to 45th pick Goran Dragić.) (Note: On September 17, 2002, Phoenix acquired a 2008 second-round draft pick from Cleveland in exchange for Milt Palacio. Phoenix used the pick to draft Malik Hairston.)	United States	G	Oregon
2009	1	14	Earl Clark	United States	SF	Louisville
2009	2	48	Taylor Griffin	United States	SF	Oklahoma
2009	2	57	Emir Preldžič (Note: On July 20, 2007, Phoenix acquired Orlando's 2009 second-round draft pick from Oklahoma City (as Seattle) in exchange for 2008 and 2010 first-round draft picks and Kurt Thomas. Previously, Oklahoma City (as Seattle) acquired a 2009 second-round draft pick on July 11, 2007 from Orlando in exchange for Rashard Lewis. Phoenix used the 57th pick to draft Emir Preldžič.) (Note: Cleveland acquired the draft rights to 57th pick Emir Preldžič from Phoenix in exchange for cash considerations.)	Bosnia and Herzegovina; Slovenia; Turkey (Note: Emir Preldžič was born in Bosnia and Herzegovina, but also has Slovenian citizenship and originally competed internationally for Slovenia. However, as of 2014, he has also gained Turkish citizenship and has competed internationally for Turkey instead.)	SF	Fenerbahçe Ülker (Turkey)
2010	2	46	Gani Lawal (Note: On December 10, 2008, Phoenix acquired Jason Richardson, Jared Dudley and a 2010 second-round pick from Charlotte in exchange for Raja Bell, Boris Diaw and Sean Singletary. The Suns used the 46th pick to draft Gani Lawal.)	United States	PF	Georgia Tech
2010	2	60	Dwayne Collins (Note: On June 25, 2009, Phoenix acquired Ben Wallace, Aleksandar Pavlović, a 2010 second-round pick and cash considerations from Cleveland in exchange for Shaquille O'Neal. The Suns used the 60th pick to draft Dwayne Collins.)	United States	PF	Miami (FL)
2011	1	13	Markieff Morris	United States	PF	Kansas
2012	1	13	Kendall Marshall	United States	PG	North Carolina
2013	1	5	Alex Len	Ukraine	C	Maryland
2013	1	30	Nemanja Nedović	Serbia	SG/PG	Liteuvos Rytas (Lithuania)
2013	2	57	Alex Oriakhi	United States	PF	Missouri
2014	1	14	T. J. Warren	United States	SF	North Carolina State
2014	1	18	Tyler Ennis	Canada	PG	Syracuse
2014	1	27	Bogdan Bogdanović	Serbia	SG	Partizan Belgrade (Serbia)
2014	2	50	Alec Brown	United States	C/PF	Wisconsin–Green Bay
2015	1	13	Devin Booker	United States	SG	Kentucky
2015	2	44	Andrew Harrison (Note: On June 26, 2015, Phoenix acquired Jon Leuer from the Memphis Grizzlies in exchange for the draft rights of Andrew Harrison.)	United States	PG	Kentucky
2016	1	4	Dragan Bender	Croatia (Note: Dragan Bender was born in Bosnia and Herzegovina, but competes internationally for Croatia.)	PF/C	Maccabi Tel Aviv (Israel)
2016	1	13	Georgios Papagiannis	Greece	C	Panathinaikos Athens (Greece)
2016	1	28	Skal Labissière	Haiti	PF/C	Kentucky
2016	2	34	Tyler Ulis	United States	PG	Kentucky
2017	1	4	Josh Jackson	United States	SF	Kansas
2017	2	32	Davon Reed	United States	SG	Miami (FL)
2017	2	54	Alec Peters	United States	PF/SF	Valparaiso
2018	1	1	Deandre Ayton	Bahamas	C	Arizona
2018	1	16	Zhaire Smith	United States	SG	Texas Tech
2018	2	31	Élie Okobo	France	PG	Élan Béarnais Pau-Lacq-Orthez (France)
2018	2	59	George King	United States	SG	Colorado
2019	1	6	Jarrett Culver	United States	SG	Texas Tech
2019	2	32	KZ Okpala	United States	SF	Stanford
2020	1	10	Jalen Smith	United States	PF	Maryland
2021	1	29	Day'Ron Sharpe	United States	C	North Carolina
2023	2	52	Toumani Camara	Belgium	SF/PF	Dayton
2024	1	28	Ryan Dunn	United States	SF	Virginia
2024	2	40	Oso Ighodaro	United States	C/PF	Marquette
2025	1	10	Khaman Maluach	South Sudan	C	Duke
2025	2	31	Rasheer Fleming	United States	PF	Saint Joseph's
2025	2	41	Koby Brea	United States	SG	Kentucky
2026	1	30	Koa Peat	United States	PF	Arizona
