= Grand Canyon Antelopes men's basketball statistical leaders =

The Grand Canyon Anelopes men's basketball statistical leaders are individual statistical leaders of the Grand Canyon Antelopes men's basketball program in various categories, including points, rebounds, assists, steals, and blocks. Within those areas, the lists identify single-game, single-season, and career leaders. The Antelopes represent Grand Canyon University (GCU) in the NCAA Division I Mountain West Conference.

GCU began competing in intercollegiate basketball in 1949, the year of its founding, as a member of the National Association of Intercollegiate Athletics (NAIA). GCU did not join the NCAA until 1991, playing in Division II until moving to Division I in 2013. This history is significant because the official recording of statistics began at different times in different organizations, as well as different NCAA divisions. The NAIA record books do not indicate when the organization began officially recording statistics on a national basis, but its current records (as of 2020–21) for single-game and single-season assists were both set in 1972–73, and the career record for blocks dates to 1975. The NCAA has recorded scoring statistics throughout the "modern era" of basketball, which it defines as starting with the 1937–38 season, the first after the center jump after each made field goal was abolished. Individual rebounding was first recorded in 1950–51, as were individual assists. While rebounding has been recorded in every subsequent season, the NCAA stopped recording individual assists after the 1951–52 season. Assists were not reinstated as an official statistic in Division I until the 1983–84 season. By the time GCU joined the NCAA, assists were officially being recorded in Division II, with that practice having started in 1988–89. However, blocks and steals were not recorded in D-II until 1992–93, four seasons after they were first recorded in D-I.

Grand Canyon's record book includes players in all named statistics, regardless of whether they were officially recorded by any of the governing bodies in which the school was a member. That said, the record book does not generally list records from before the 1950s, as records from before this period are often incomplete and inconsistent. Since scoring was much lower in this era, and teams played much fewer games during a typical season, it is likely that few or no players from this era would appear on these lists anyway. These lists are updated through the end of the 2020–21 season.

== Scoring ==
Career
Rank	Player	Points	Seasons
1	Bayard Forrest	2,195	1972–73 1973–74 1974–75 1975–76
2	Joshua Braun	1,714	2014–15 2015–16 2016–17 2017–18
3	Alessandro Lever	1,629	2017–18 2018–19 2019–20 2020–21
4	Duane Gagnon	1,490	1965–66 1966–67 1967–68 1968–69
	Rayshon Harrison	1,490	2022–23 2023–24 2024–25
6	Jim Irvine	1,420	1970–71 1971–72 1972–73 1973–74
7	Doug Baker	1,373	1955–56 1956–57 1957–58 1958–59
8	Jovan Blacksher Jr.	1,354	2019–20 2020–21 2021–22 2022–23 2023–24
9	Gabe McGlothan	1,329	2020–21 2021–22 2022–23 2023–24
10	Chad Briscoe	1,313	1991–92 1992–93

Season
Rank	Player	Points	Season
1	Chad Briscoe	747	1992–93
2	Ron Singleton	726	1986–87
3	Tyon Grant-Foster	684	2023–24
4	Wayne Bateman	654	1966–67
5	Dana Pope	642	1993–94
6	Rodney Johns	640	1987–88
	Rayshon Harrison	640	2022–23
8	Bayard Forrest	602	1974–75
9	DeWayne Russell	593	2016–17
10	Kevin Warren	582	1984–85

Single game
Rank	Player	Points	Season	Opponent
1	Ron Singleton	46	1986–87	Western New Mexico
2	Chad Briscoe	44	1992–93	Bridgeport
	Ben Lindsey	44	1961–62	La Verne
4	Doug Baker	43	1956–57	La Verne
5	DeWayne Russell	42	2016–17	Louisville

== Rebounds ==
Career
Rank	Player	Rebounds	Seasons
1	Bayard Forrest	1,544	1972–73 1973–74 1974–75 1975–76
2	T.C. Dean	1,063	1956–57 1957–58 1958–59
3	Jim Rice	891	1967–68 1968–69 1969–70 1970–71
4	Bill Price	862	1976–77 1977–78 1978–79 1979–80
5	Gabe McGlothan	855	2020–21 2021–22 2022–23 2023–24
6	Duane Gagnon	847	1965–66 1966–67 1967–68 1968–69
7	Ben Lindsey	827	1959–60 1960–61 1961–62
8	Bob Hill	810	1952–53 1953–54 1954–55 1955–56
9	Melvin Rising	781	1952–53 1953–54 1954–55 1955–56
10	Jim Irvine	764	1970–71 1971–72 1972–73 1973–74

Season
Rank	Player	Rebounds	Season
1	Bayard Forrest	420	1972–73
2	Bayard Forrest	415	1974–75
3	T.C. Dean	402	1957–58
4	Bayard Forrest	384	1973–74
5	Killian Larson	348	2012–13
6	Ben Lindsey	342	1959–60
7	T.C. Dean	341	1958–59
8	Cecil Scroggins	333	1986–87
9	Bayard Forrest	325	1975–76
10	T.C. Dean	320	1956–57

Single game
Rank	Player	Rebounds	Season	Opponent
1	T.C. Dean	26	1957–58	Phoenix College
2	Bayard Forrest	24	1972–73	Claremont Mudd

== Assists ==
Career
Rank	Player	Assists	Seasons
1	Craig Johnson	455	1987–88 1988–89
2	Jovan Blacksher Jr.	433	2019–20 2020–21 2021–22 2022–23 2023–24
3	DeWayne Russell	423	2014–15 2015–16 2016–17
4	Bayard Forrest	421	1972–73 1973–74 1974–75 1975–76
5	Ryan Nelson	387	2004–05 2005–06
6	Rayshon Harrison	359	2022–23 2023–24 2024–25
7	Chester Hayes	292	1990–91 1991–92 1992–93 1993–94

Season
Rank	Player	Assists	Season
1	Ryan Nelson	263	2005–06
2	Craig Johnson	228	1987–88
3	Craig Johnson	227	1988–89
4	Rodney Johns	185	1987–88
5	DeWayne Russell	182	2015–16

Single game
Rank	Player	Assists	Season	Opponent
1	Ryan Nelson	20	2005–06	Notre Dame de Namur
2	Elbert Meeks	14	1993–94	Southern Colorado
	Elbert Meeks	14	1992–93	Chico State
	Craig Johnson	14	1988–89	Colorado Christian

== Steals ==
Career
Rank	Player	Steals	Seasons
1	Jim Irvine	210	1970–71 1971–72 1972–73 1973–74
2	Kenny Archbold	198	1994–95 1995–96 1996–97
3	David Everett	192	1971–72 1973–74 1974–75 1975–76
4	Jovan Blacksher Jr.	177	2019–20 2020–21 2021–22 2022–23 2023–24
5	Rodney Johns	161	1986–87 1987–88
6	Chad Briscoe	155	1991–92 1992–93

Season
Rank	Player	Steals	Season
1	Rodney Johns	97	1987–88
2	Chad Briscoe	90	1992–93
3	Kenny Archbold	86	1996–97
4	Joey Allison	81	1990–91
5	Nate Stokes	79	1977–78

Single game
Rank	Player	Steals	Season	Opponent
1	Jeff Fudge	10	1985–86	The Master's College

== Blocks ==
Career
Rank	Player	Blocks	Seasons
1	Horacio Llamas	172	1994–95 1995–96
2	Nathan Hansen	150	1995–96 1996–97 1997–98
3	Bryan Lee	147	2003–04 2004–05 2005–06 2006–07
4	Joshua Ondigo	137	1988–89 1989–90 1990–91 1991–92
5	Andre Hall	94	1997–98 1998–99

Season
Rank	Player	Blocks	Season
1	Horacio Llamas	106	1995–96
2	Horacio Llamas	66	1994–95
3	Bryan Lee	64	2006–07
4	Braylon Pickrel	63	2011–12
	Nathan Hansen	63	1997–98

Single game
Rank	Player	Blocks	Season	Opponent
1	Horacio Llamas	10	1995–96	Clarke
