= List of Memphis Tigers in the NBA =

This is a list of Memphis Tigers men's basketball players who played in the National Basketball Association.

== Current NBA players ==
As of the 2025–26 NBA Season, six former Tigers are currently signed to NBA rosters.

- Precious Achiuwa, Sacramento Kings
- Jalen Duren, Detroit Pistons
- Josh Minott, Boston Celtics
- Nae'Qwan Tomlin, Cleveland Cavaliers
- David Jones Garcia, San Antonio Spurs
- Moussa Cisse, Dallas Mavericks

== All-time list of Memphis Tigers in the NBA & NBA draft ==
Since the NBA draft began in 1947, Memphis has produced 14 first-round picks, including 8 top-ten picks and one number-one pick (Derrick Rose). Three former Tigers have been named NBA All-Stars: Larry Kenon (twice), Penny Hardaway (4 times), and Derrick Rose (3 times). Four have gone on to win the NBA Championship: Win Wilfong with the St. Louis Hawks in 1958, William Bedford with the Detroit Pistons in 1990, Earl Barron with the Miami Heat in 2006, and James Wiseman with the Golden State Warriors in 2022.

In 2010, Memphis became the second college to produce two consecutive NBA Rookie of the Year winners: Derrick Rose in 2009 and Tyreke Evans in 2010 (the first being North Carolina with winners Walter Davis in 1978 and Phil Ford in 1979). In 2011, Rose became the first former Tiger to be named the NBA Most Valuable Player.

Many Memphis players since the 1960s that have gone undrafted or had unsuccessful NBA careers have also played in professional leagues in Europe, Asia and/or Latin America.

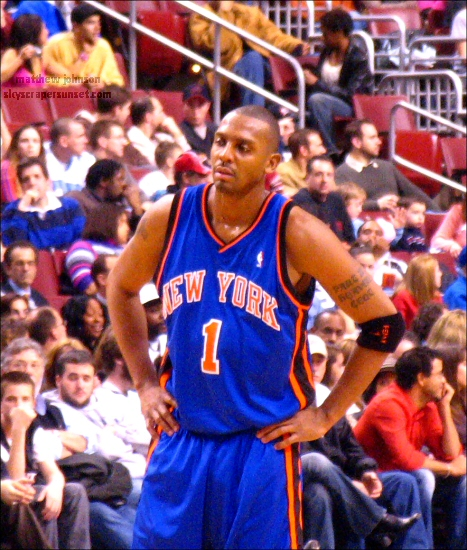
Penny Hardaway playing for the New York Knicks (2004–2006)

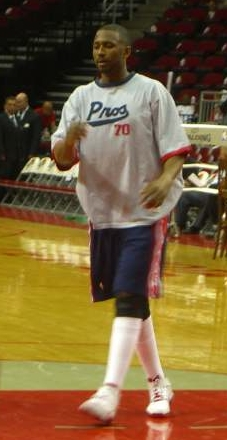
Lorenzen Wright playing for the Memphis Grizzlies (2001–2006)

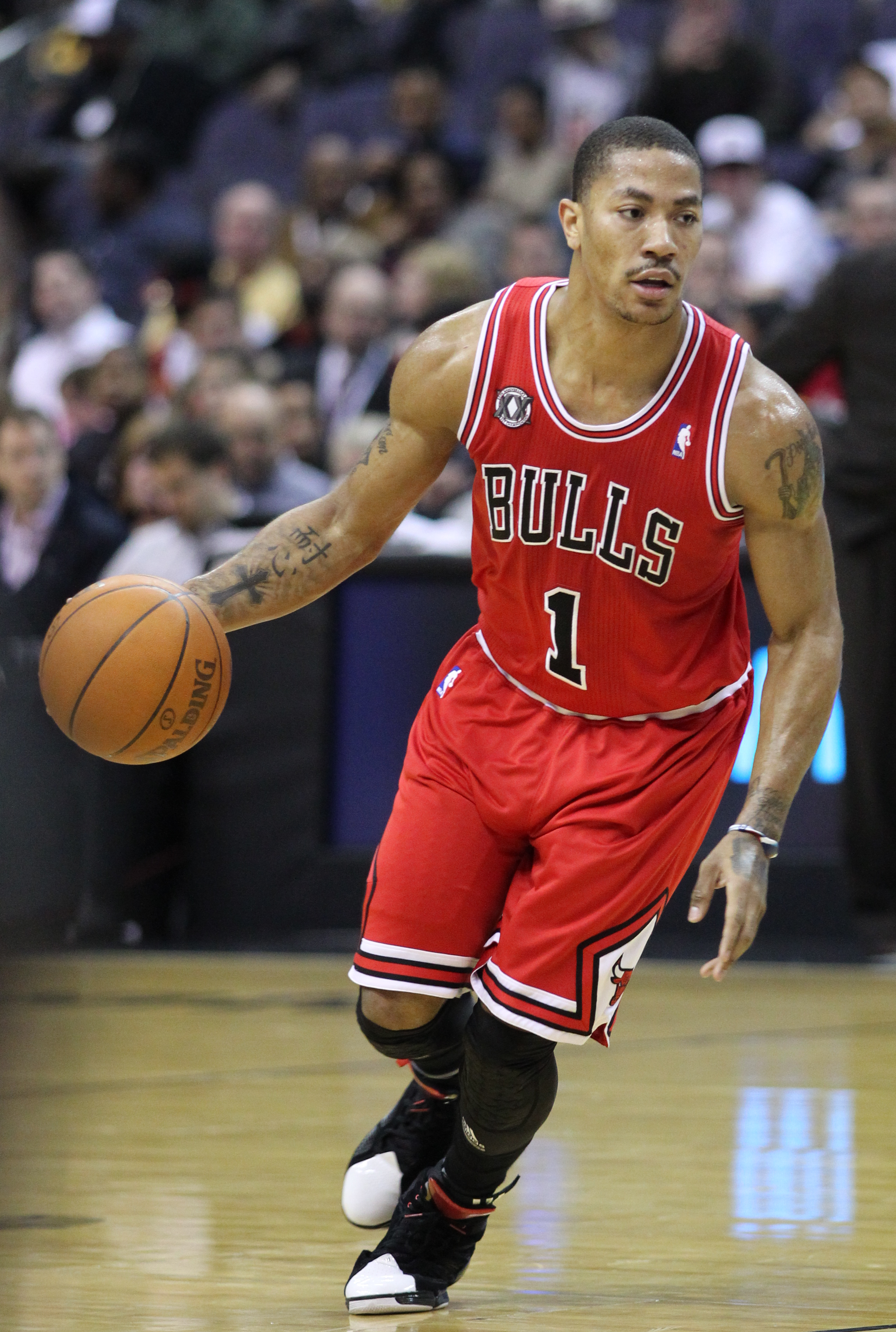
Derrick Rose playing for the Chicago Bulls (2008–2016)

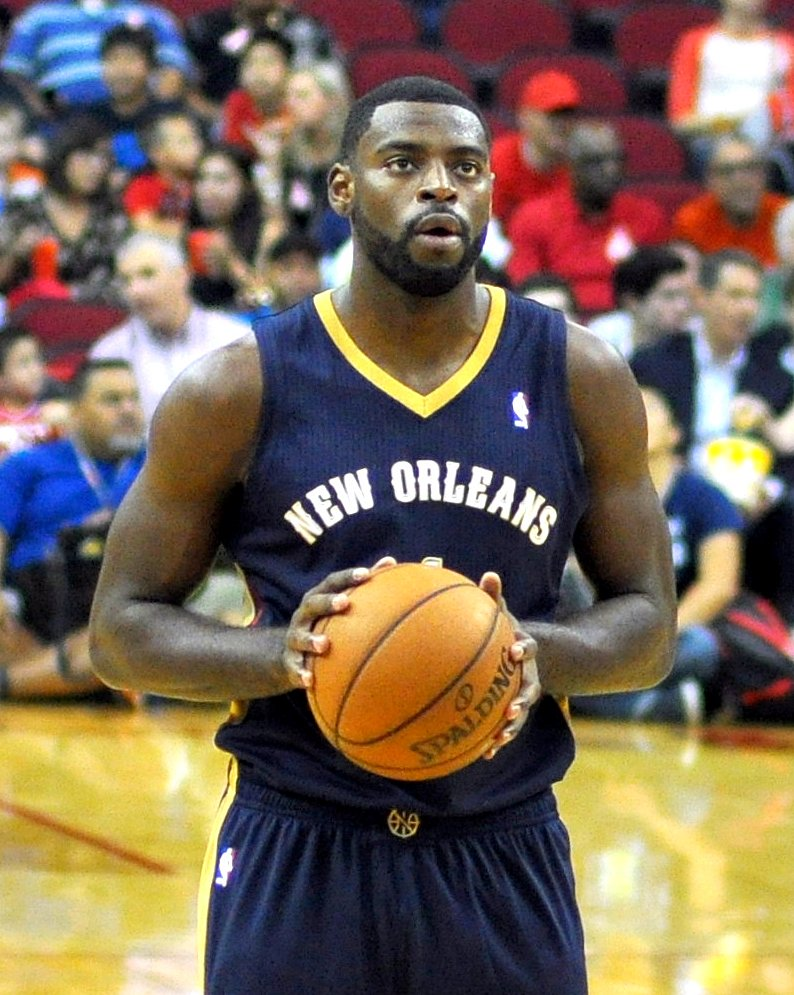
Tyreke Evans playing for the New Orleans Pelicans (2013–2017)

NBA players who attended Memphis
Player	Year	Round	Pick	Team	Seasons	Years active (NBA & ABA)	Achievements
Win Wilfong	1957	1	4th	St. Louis Hawks	4	1957–1961	1958 NBA Champion
Jim Hackaday^{[e]}	1959	3	17th	Philadelphia Warriors			
Orby Arnold^{[e]}	1959	7	53rd	St. Louis Hawks			
George Price^{[e]}	1960	8	58th	New York Knicks			
Wayne Yates	1961	1	5th	Los Angeles Lakers	1	1961–1962	
Lowery Kirk^{[e]}	1961	4	34th	Cincinnati Royals			
Hunter Beckman^{[e]}	1963	7	58th	Cincinnati Royals			
George Kirk^{[e]}	1964	5	42nd	Cincinnati Royals			
Bob Neumann^{[e]}	1964	10	83rd	Cincinnati Royals			
Mike Butler^{[a]}	1968	10	121st	San Diego Rockets	4	1968–1972	
Rich Jones^{[a]}^{[b]}	1969	5	58th	Phoenix Suns	7	1970–1977	
James Douglas^{[e]}	1971	16	226th	Buffalo Braves			
Doug Holcomb^{[e]}	1972	6	94th	Boston Celtics			
Ronnie Robinson^{[a]}	1973	4	60th	Phoenix Suns	2	1973–1975	
Larry Kenon^{[a]}^{[c]}	1973	3	50th	Detroit Pistons	10	1973–1983	2x NBA All-Star
Larry Finch^{[a]}	1973	4	68th	Los Angeles Lakers	2	1973–1975	
Bill Cook^{[e]}	1976	3	49th	Washington Bullets			
Marion Hillard^{[e]}	1976	4	65th	Washington Bullets			
James Bradley^{[e]}	1979	2	35th	Atlanta Hawks			
Rodney Lee^{[e]}	1979	8	150th	Detroit Pistons			
Dennis Isbell^{[e]}	1981	5	100th	San Diego Clippers			
Hank McDowell	1981	5	102nd	Golden State Warriors	5	1981–1986	
Otis Jackson^{[e]}	1982	8	174th	New Jersey Nets			
Chris Faggi^{[e]}	1982	8	179th	San Antonio Spurs			
Bobby Parks^{[e]}	1984	3	58th	Atlanta Hawks			
Phillip Haynes^{[e]}	1984	6	121st	Los Angeles Clippers			
Keith Lee	1985	1	11th	Chicago Bulls	4	1985–1989	
Baskerville Holmes^{[e]}	1986	3	68th	Milwaukee Bucks			
Andre Turner	1986	3	69th	Los Angeles Lakers	6	1986–1992	
William Bedford	1986	1	6th	Phoenix Suns	7	1986–1993	1990 NBA Champion
Vincent Askew	1987	2	39th	Philadelphia 76ers	9	1987–1988, 1990–1998	
Sylvester Gray	1988	2	35th	Miami Heat	1	1988–1989	
Dwight Boyd^{[e]}	1988	3	66th	Denver Nuggets			
Elliot Perry	1991	2	37th	Los Angeles Clippers	9	1991–1992, 1994–2002	
Penny Hardaway	1993	1	3rd	Golden State Warriors	14	1993–2007	4x NBA All-Star, 2x All-NBA First Team, All-NBA Third Team
Todd Mundt	1995	undrafted	n/a	Boston Celtics	1	1995–1996	
David Vaughn III	1995	1	25th	Orlando Magic	4	1995–1999	
Lorenzen Wright	1996	1	7th	Los Angeles Clippers	13	1996–2009	
Cedric Henderson	1997	2	44th	Cleveland Cavaliers	5	1997–2002	
Chris Garner	1997	undrafted	n/a	Toronto Raptors	2	1997–1998, 2001	
Dajuan Wagner	2002	1	6th	Cleveland Cavaliers	4	2002–2006	
Antonio Burks	2004	2	37th	Orlando Magic	2	2004–2006	
Earl Barron	2005	undrafted	n/a	Miami Heat	3	2005–2006, 2010–2012	2006 NBA Champion
Shawne Williams	2006	1	17th	Indiana Pacers	9	2006–2015	
Rodney Carney	2006	1	16th	Chicago Bulls	5	2006–2011	
Darius Washington Jr.	2007	undrafted	n/a	San Antonio Spurs	1	2007	
Chris Douglas-Roberts	2008	2	40th	New Jersey Nets	7	2008–2015	
Joey Dorsey	2008	2	33rd	Portland Trail Blazers	3	2008–2011	
Derrick Rose	2008	1	1st	Chicago Bulls	16	2008–2024	2011 NBA MVP, 3x NBA All-Star, All-NBA First Team, 2009 NBA Rookie of the Year
Tyreke Evans	2009	1	4th	Sacramento Kings	10	2009–2019	2010 NBA Rookie of the Year
Robert Dozier^{[e]}	2009	2	60th	Miami Heat			
Antonio Anderson	2009	undrafted	n/a	Oklahoma City Thunder	1	2010	
Elliot Williams	2010	1	22nd	Portland Trail Blazers	6	2010–2016	
Will Barton	2012	2	40th	Portland Trail Blazers	11	2012–2023	
D.J. Stephens	2013	undrafted	n/a	Milwaukee Bucks	2	2014, 2018	
Adonis Thomas	2013	undrafted	n/a	Orlando Magic	1	2014	
Tarik Black^{[d]}	2014	undrafted	n/a	Houston Rockets	4	2014–2018	
Jeremiah Martin	2019	undrafted	n/a	Brooklyn Nets	1	2020–2021	
James Wiseman	2020	1	2nd	Golden State Warriors	5	2020–2025	2022 NBA Champion
**Precious Achiuwa**	2020	1	20th	Miami Heat	5	2020–present	
**Jalen Duren**	2022	1	13th	Charlotte Hornets	3	2022–present	
**Josh Minott**	2022	2	45th	Charlotte Hornets	3	2022–present	
Lester Quiñones	2022	undrafted	n/a	Golden State Warriors	2	2022–2024	
Damion Baugh^{[d]}	2023	undrafted	n/a	Charlotte Hornets	1	2025	
Emoni Bates^{[d]}	2023	2	19th	Cleveland Cavaliers	2	2023–2025	
Boogie Ellis^{[d]}	2024	undrafted	n/a	Sacramento Kings	1	2024	
**Nae'Qwan Tomlin**	2024	undrafted	n/a	Cleveland Cavaliers	2	2025–present	
**David Jones Garcia**	2024	undrafted	n/a	San Antonio Spiurs	1	2025–present	
**Moussa Cisse**	2025	undrafted	n/a	Dallas Mavericks	1	2025–present	

currently active players are in bold

- **^{a}** Player chose to play professionally in the American Basketball Association (ABA), which existed from 1967 to 1976.
- **^{b}** Rich Jones was originally drafted by the Phoenix Suns in 1968 in the fourth round as the 49th pick, but opted not to play. In 1969, he was drafted again by the Suns but chose instead to play in the ABA for the Dallas Chaparrals. He would eventually play in the NBA in 1976 when the New Jersey Nets joined as part of the NBA-ABA merger.
- **^{c}** Larry Kenon moved to the NBA after the San Antonio Spurs joined the NBA in 1976, as part of the NBA-ABA merger.
- **^{d}** These players began their careers at the University of Memphis
  - Tarik Black played at Memphis from 2010 to 2013 and transferred to Kansas for his senior season.
  - Damion Baugh played at Memphis from 2019 to 2021 and transferred to TCU for his senior and 5th seasons.
  - Emoni Bates played at Memphis from 2021 to 2022 and transferred to Eastern Michigan for his sophomore season.
  - Boogie Ellis played at Memphis from 2019 to 2021 and transferred to USC for his redshirt sophomore, junior and senior seasons.
- **^{e}** Player was drafted but never played an NBA game.
