= 1988 NAIA men's basketball tournament =

Men's basketball tournament in 1988

- Teams: 32
- Finals site: Kemper Arena; Kansas City, Missouri
- Champions: Grand Canyon (AZ) (3 title, 3 title game, 3 Fab Four)
- Runner-up: Auburn-Montgomery (1 title game, 1 Fab Four)
- Semifinalists: Charleston (SC) (2 Final Four); Waynesburg (PA) (1 Final Four)
- Charles Stevenson Hustle Award: Shawn McCallister (Waynesburg (PA))
- Chuck Taylor MVP: Rodney Johns (Grand Canyon)

The 1988 NAIA men's basketball tournament was held in March at Kemper Arena in Kansas City, Missouri. The 51st annual NAIA basketball tournament featured 32 teams playing in a single-elimination format.

This was the last time that a third-place game (featuring the losing national semifinalist teams) determined 3rd and 4th places in the tournament on the court.

== Awards and honors ==
- Leading scorers: Reginald Henderson Rodney Johns
- Leading rebounder:
- Player of the Year: est. 1994.

== Bracket ==
First round	Second round
1	St. Thomas Aquinas (N.Y.)	93
-	Hillsdale (Mich.)	83
1	St. Thomas Aquinas	84
16	Wisconsin–Eau Claire	69
16	Wisconsin–Eau Claire	74
-	Westmont (Calif.)	59
TOP TIER
9	College of Charleston (S.C.)	78
-	Defiance (Ohio)	62
9	Charleston (S.C.)	73'
-	Ozarks (Ark.)	59
8	Transylvania (Ky.)	75
-	Ozarks (Ark.)	79*
5	William Jewell (Mo.)	68
-	Georgia College	55
12	Western Washington	70
5	William Jewell	89
12	Western Washington	80
-	West Virginia Tech	67
TOP TIER
13	Grace (Ind.)	97
-	Paul Quinn (Tex.)	89
-	Grace	66
4	Auburn-Montgomery	73
4	Auburn–Montgomery (Ala.)	79'
-	Hawaii Pacific	69
3	David Lipscomb (Tenn.)	89
-	East Texas Baptist	63
3	David Lipscomb	108
14	College of Idaho	123
14	College of Idaho	88
-	Southern Nazarene (Okla.)	75
BOTTOM TIER
11	Grand Canyon (Ariz.)	103
-	Hastings (Neb.)	75
11	Grand Canyon	101
6	Fort Hays State	95
6	Fort Hays State (Kan.)	95
-	Belmont Abbey (N.C.)	63
7	McKendree (Ill.)	124
-	Huron (S.D.)	107
7	McKendree	79
-	Dordt	86
10	Mobile (Ala.)	71
-	Dordt (Iowa)	86
BOTTOM TIER
15	Minnesota Duluth	70
-	Eastern (Pa.)	42
15	Minnesota-Duluth	64
2	Waynesburg	68
2	Waynesburg (Pa.)	83
-	Franklin Pierce (N.H.)	72

Elite Eight
9	Charleston (S.C.)	81
1	St. Thomas Aquinas	61
5	William Jewell	49
4	Auburn-Montgomery	51
11	Grand Canyon	99*
14	College of Idaho	96
-	Dordt	66
2	Waynesburg	87

NAIA national semifinals
9	Charleston (S.C.)	70
4	Auburn-Montgomery	74
11	Grand Canyon	108
2	Waynesburg	106

NAIA national championship
4	Auburn-Montgomery	86
11	Grand Canyon	89*
NAIA third-place game
9	Charleston (S.C.)	89
2	Waynesburg	61

- * denotes overtime.

== See also ==
- 1988 NCAA Division I men's basketball tournament
- 1988 NCAA Division II men's basketball tournament
- 1988 NCAA Division III men's basketball tournament
- 1988 NAIA women's basketball tournament
