= Mike Jones (basketball, born 1967) =

American basketball player (born 1967)

Personal information
- Born: February 10, 1967 (age 59) Columbus, Georgia
- Listed height: 6 ft 7 in (2.01 m)

Career information
- High school: Oak Hill Academy (Mouth of Wilson, Virginia)
- College: Auburn (1985–1988)
- NBA draft: 1988: 3rd round, 63rd overall pick
- Drafted by: Milwaukee Bucks
- Playing career: 1988–2006
- Position: Small forward

Career history
- 1987–1988: Pensacola Tornados
- 1988: Jersey Shore Bucs
- 1988–1989: PAOK Thessaloniki
- 1989–1990: Aris Thessaloniki
- 1990–1992: EB Pau Orthez
- 1992–1993: FC Barcelona
- 1993–1994: Pitch Cholet
- 1994–1995: EB Pau Orthez
- 1995–1996: Hapoel Holon
- 1996: CB Murcia
- 1996–1998: Peñarol de Mar del Plata
- 1998–2001: Apollon Limassol BC
- 2000–2001: Shanghai Sharks
- 2001–2003: Welcome Montevideo
- 2003–2004: Asteras Limassol
- 2004–2005: Digenis Akritas Morphou
- 2005–2006: Apollon Limassol BC

Career highlights
- First-team Parade All-American (1985)
- Stats at Basketball Reference

Mike Fritzthadus Jones (born February 10, 1967) is an American former professional basketball player.

== High school career ==
Born in Phoenix, Arizona, Jones was named a First-Team Parade All-American, while at Oak Hill Academy, in Mouth of Wilson, Virginia.

== College career ==
Jones played college basketball at Auburn University, in Auburn, Alabama, with the Auburn Tigers. Jones was a sixth man on the 1985-86 Auburn Tigers Elite Eight team with Chuck Person and Chris Morris, then moved up to starter then next season after Person graduated and left for the NBA. Jones averaged 15.8 points and 7.2 rebounds, leading the Tigers to the NCAA Tournament where they lost in the second round to eventual champion Indiana. Jones had a career high 30 points in the loss to Indiana.

Jones got off to an impressive start the next season, 1987-88. He was averaging 21.9 points per game, but seven games into the season he was dismissed from the team for being academically ineligible.

== Professional career ==
Jones was selected by the Milwaukee Bucks in the third round (63rd pick overall) of the 1988 NBA draft. He played for the Jersey Shore Bucs of the United States Basketball League (USBL). He then moved to Europe to play with the Greek club PAOK in 1988. In 1990, he played with the Greek club Aris at the 1990 Euroleague Final Four.

Jones won the French League championship in 1992, and the French Cup title in 1991 and 1992, while playing with Pau Orthez. In the 1992–93 season, he played with FC Barcelona in both the Korać Cup and the Spanish ACB League.

Jones also played for Cholet Cedex Basket, CB Murcia, Hapoel Holon, Peñarol Mar del Plata, the Omaha Racers (CBA), Apollon Limassol, Welcome Montevideo, Asteras Limassol, and Digenis Akritas Morphou.
