= Rodney Johns =

American basketball player (1964–1995)

- Johns in 1988

Personal information
- Born: October 13, 1964 Phoenix, Arizona, U.S.
- Died: December 5, 1995 (aged 31) Phoenix, Arizona, U.S.
- Listed height: 6 ft 1 in (1.85 m)
- Listed weight: 202 lb (92 kg)

Career information
- High school: Phoenix Union (Phoenix, Arizona)
- College: Scottsdale CC (1982–1983); South Mountain CC (1983–1984); Grand Canyon (1986–1988)
- NBA draft: 1988: 3rd round, 55th overall pick
- Drafted by: Phoenix Suns
- Position: Point guard
- Coaching career: 1990–1993

Career history

Playing
- 1989: Altos Auckland

Coaching
- 1990–1993: Grand Canyon (assistant)

Career highlights
- NAIA champion (1988); NAIA tournament MVP (1988)
- Stats at Basketball Reference

Rodney Glenn Johns Sr. (October 13, 1964 – December 5, 1995) was an American professional basketball player. He played college basketball for the Scottsdale CC Fighting Artichokes, South Mountain CC Cougars and Grand Canyon Antelopes. Johns led the Antelopes to the NAIA men's basketball championship in 1988 and was selected as the most valuable player of the tournament.

Johns was selected in the third round of the 1988 NBA draft by his hometown Phoenix Suns but did not make the team. He played professionally in New Zealand for one season and then returned to Grand Canyon where he became an assistant coach for the Antelopes from 1990 to 1993. Johns desired a career in coaching but was unable to find another position. On December 5, 1995, he drove his car at a high speed into a wall in Phoenix, Arizona, killing himself and his sister, Deborah Peters, who was a passenger.

== Early life ==
Johns was born in Phoenix, Arizona, and raised in the Matthew Henson housing project. He lived with his mother, Mary Conerly, and two brothers. Johns described the area where his family lived as "the ghetto."

Johns attended Phoenix Union High School where he played basketball. Johns was a late bloomer who was "chunky and slow" as a sophomore. He turned himself into the starting power forward and led the junior varsity team to a 19–1 record during the 1981–82 season.

Johns also played on the football team at Phoenix Union until his senior year.

Johns graduated from Phoenix Union as part of the last class before it closed in 1982.

== College career ==
Johns attended four colleges in six seasons. He spent the 1982–83 season at Scottsdale Community College; he decided to transfer because he grew tired of making the commute from his home in Phoenix to the campus in Scottsdale. He enrolled at South Mountain Community College. Johns dropped out of school for a year until he earned enough credits to transfer to College of Santa Fe in 1985 but did not like the college and quit early in the season.

Johns transferred to Grand Canyon University in 1986 to play for the Antelopes, and was coached by Paul Westphal. Johns spoke adamantly of Westphal who he believed "gave [him] the total perspective, on the basketball floor and off." He played the first 28 games of the 1986–87 season but had to sit out the second semester due to his stint at the College of Santa Fe.

Johns played primarily as a point guard for the Antelopes but was also utilised as a shooting guard and in both forward positions by Westphal. He had averaged 12.9 points per game during the 1987–88 regular season before he boosted his average to 30.2 points during a five-game run in the 1988 NAIA men's basketball tournament. Johns scored 41 points in the championship game to defeat the Auburn Montgomery Warhawks 88–86, including the winning basket when he hit a jump shot with two seconds remaining in overtime. Johns was selected as the Chuck Taylor Most Valuable Player for his tournament performance.

Johns graduated with a degree in criminal justice. The 1987–88 Antelopes men's basketball team was inducted into the Grand Canyon Athletics Hall of Fame in 1989.

== Professional career ==
Johns was selected in the third round of the 1988 NBA draft by the Phoenix Suns. He signed with the Suns on September 27, 1988, after he performed well during pre-camp workouts and was considered as a strong candidate to make the team. Johns struggled during four preseason games with the Suns where he scored 12 points but committed 15 turnovers. He was waived by the Suns on November 1, 1988.

The Suns sent Johns to New Zealand, where he played for Altos Auckland during the 1989 season. He also played in semiprofessional leagues.

== Post-playing career ==
Johns returned to the Grand Canyon Antelopes as an assistant coach in 1990. Johns served in the position until 1993, when he chose to leave on his own accord. He worked as a substitute teacher in the Phoenix Union High School District. Johns had aspirations of becoming a coach but was unable to find a position.

Johns stayed in contact with Westphal who tried to help him secure a permanent job. Westphal arranged a position for Johns as a security guard at America West Arena but Johns did not show up. Westphal reflected: "The last period of his life, he was not acting like himself. We were concerned." In the week before his death, Johns visited his high school basketball coach to enquire about a job as a security guard and claimed that he would get his position at Grand Canyon back.

== Personal life ==
Johns had five children with multiple women. His mother claimed that he was able to take responsibility of his children but financial problems would get him down. Johns did not openly share his feelings to others with the exception of his sister, Deborah Peters, with whom he was close. He lived between his mother's house and with a girlfriend.

== Death ==
On December 5, 1995, Johns left the house of his mother and drove away in his 1987 Cadillac with Peters as a passenger. Near the housing project where he was raised, police claimed that Johns ran a stop sign and drove into a concrete retaining wall at over 80 miles per hour (130 km/h). Johns and Peters were both killed on impact. The reason for Johns killing himself was not known by his family.

Johns' son, Tamarcus, was a high school basketball prospect who experienced legal troubles and academic difficulties while dealing with the suicide of his father.
