= The Havocs (GCU student section) =

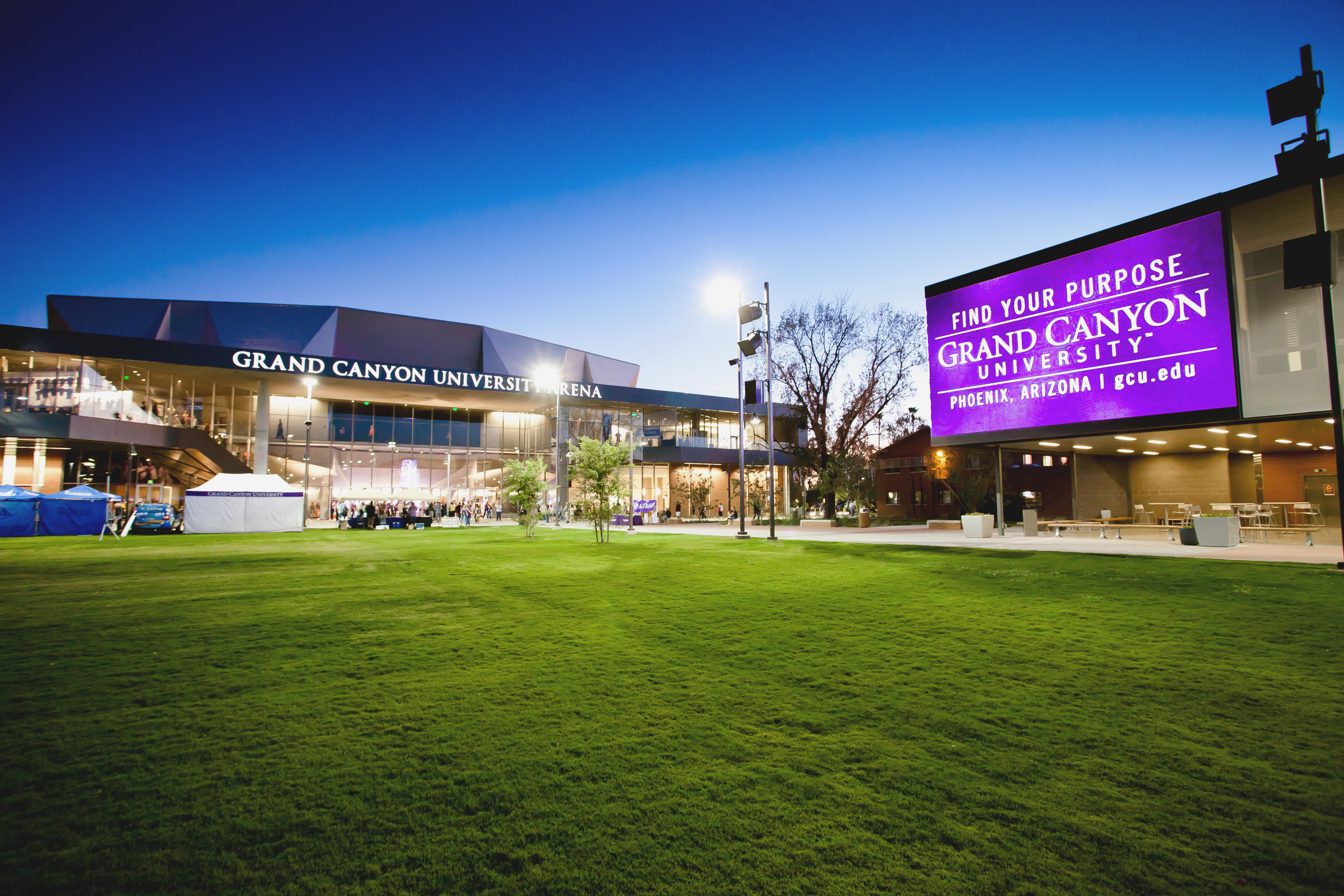
The Havocs have raised the national profile of Global Credit Union Arena.

The Havocs represent the student section of the teams that support the Grand Canyon Antelopes athletic teams at Grand Canyon University.

Known primarily for their support of the men's basketball team, the Havocs have gained national recognition as one of the best student sections in college basketball and have been dubbed "the biggest party in college basketball."

During home men's basketball games, the Havocs take up the majority of the east sideline at Global Credit Union Arena as well as the south baseline near the opposing bench.

== Recognition ==
The first publication to give national-level acclaim to the growing profile of the Havocs was SB Nation and writer Mark Sandritter in January 2016 in an article titled "The student section at Grand Canyon University is the biggest party in college basketball."

College basketball hall of fame coach Rick Pitino gave the Havocs more praise when his Louisville team visited on December 3, 2016. Pitino said, "In my 40 plus years, this was the toughest crowd I've ever faced ... whether we go to Duke, Kentucky, nothing was as tough as that environment tonight ... they have more students than come to one of our games."

NBA star Donovan Mitchell, who also played at GCU while at Louisville, doubled down on the praise in January 2018 on a podcast with Michael Rapaport. Mitchell said, "I'm going to give a shoutout to Grand Canyon University ... the craziest place I've ever played ... every single student knew exactly what to do on beat ... that beats Michigan State, beats at Kentucky, beats at Miami when it was crazy, at Pitt when it was crazy, it beats at Syracuse, it doesn't matter, at Carolina." He later tweeted in 2019, @spidadmitchell (November 21, 2019). "I've been saying this the craziest arena I've ever played in!" (Tweet) – via Twitter.

The Havocs have received national acclaim from SB Nation, USA Today, The Athletic, The Washington Post and ESPN.

College basketball writer Andy Katz included the Havocs in his list of top-10 student sections in 2023.

The Havocs have helped create "one of the loudest college basketball environments in the nation."

== Early history ==
The Havocs began in the early 2010s shortly after the opening of Global Credit Union Arena and coinciding with the university's jump to NCAA Division I. Originally labeled the Monsoon, the student section began with spots for about 165 students. The Monsoon grew and the Havocs formed as the most passionate group of the Monsoon. The concept was consolidated to one expanding group called the Havocs, exploding to upwards of 4,000 students per game over a span of a few years.

== Traditions ==
- Camp Elliott is the name of the turfed area in front of the arena where students pitch tents and wait for the best seats for big games and Midnight Madness.
- The Purple Pregame Party refers to the five-minute pregame routine that includes coordinated dances, spirit programs waving flags and students dancing to songs and unraveling banners.

== See also ==
- Grand Canyon Antelopes
- Grand Canyon Antelopes men's basketball
- Global Credit Union Arena
