= Bandon Senior High School =

Bandon High School
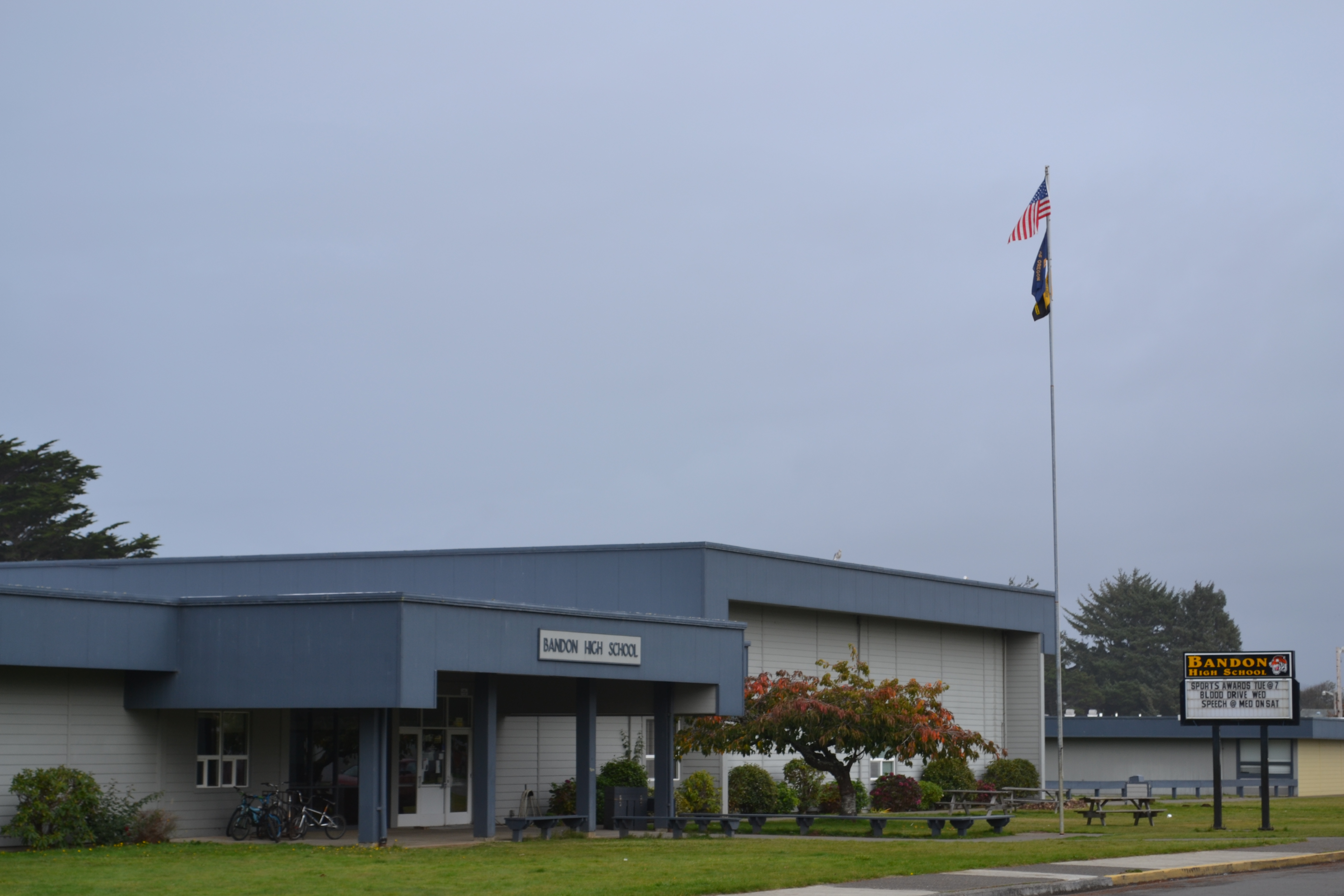

Location
- 550 9th Street SW; Bandon, (Coos County), Oregon 97411; United States; 43.114739°N 124.42044°W

Information
- Type: Public
- School district: Bandon School District
- Principal: Sam Dockery
- Teaching staff: 16.97 (FTE)
- Grades: 9-12
- Enrollment: 212 (2024–2025)
- Student to teacher ratio: 12.49
- Campus: Suburban
- Colors: Black, gold, and Columbia blue
- Athletics conference: OSAA Sunset Conference 3A-4
- Mascot: Tiger
- Team name: Bandon Tigers
- Rival: Myrtle Point High School

Bandon High School is the only public high school in Bandon, Oregon, United States.

== History ==
Bandon School District #54 was established in 1886. The first Bandon High School was originally built in 1888, on a bluff overlooking the Coquille River known as Coast Guard Hill. The school was located there until 1908 when a newer building was built, which is now Ocean Crest Elementary. From 1922 to 1950, Bandon High School was located on the east side of town, near what is currently the Bandon High School baseball field. In 1950 a new building was built near the current Harbor Lights Middle school gym. An arsonist burned that building to the ground on January 1, 1974. For the next few months, classes were held in various buildings in Bandon until the current Bandon High School building was completed in the fall of 1975.

== Academics ==
In 2008, 84% of the school's seniors received a high school diploma. Of 58 students, 49 graduated, two dropped out, one received a modified diploma, and six were still in high school the following year.

In 2024, Bandon was awarded the OSAA Cup for overall excellence in athletics, academics, activities and sportsmanship for the first time in school history. Bandon finished with 2,495 points, ranking above Class 2A ranks.

== Athletics ==
Bandon has won state titles in girls track, band and finished atop the Academic All-State standings for girls' track as well. Their sports teams, the Tigers, advanced to the state playoffs in football, boys' basketball, baseball, and boys' and girls' cross country.

=== State championships ===
- Band: 2016, 2023, 2024, 2025
- Boys Cross Country: 2016
- Boys Golf: 2018, 2024, 2025, 2026
- Boys Track & Field: 2018, 2022
- Football: 1950, 1968
- Girls Cross Country: 2021
- Girls Track & Field: 2023, 2024
- Speech & Debate: 2001, 2005, 2009, 2022, 2025
