= Bayard Forrest =

American basketball player (born 1954)

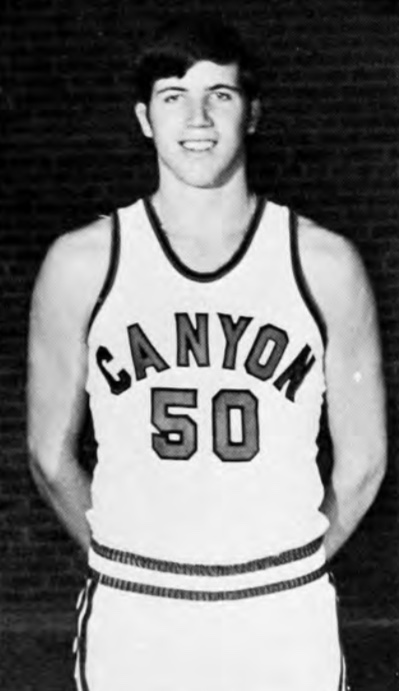
- Forrest as a freshman at Grand Canyon

Personal information
- Born: July 8, 1954 (age 72) San Jose, California, U.S.
- Listed height: 6 ft 10 in (2.08 m)
- Listed weight: 235 lb (107 kg)

Career information
- High school: Bandon (Bandon, Oregon)
- College: Grand Canyon (1972–1976)
- NBA draft: 1976: 2nd round, 19th overall pick
- Drafted by: Seattle SuperSonics
- Playing career: 1977–1979
- Position: Center
- Number: 35

Career history
- 1977–1979: Phoenix Suns

Career highlights
- NAIA champion (1975); NAIA tournament MVP (1975); 3× First-team NAIA All-American (1974–1976)
- Stats at NBA.com
- Stats at Basketball Reference

Bayard Forrest (born July 8, 1954) is a retired American professional basketball player. He was a 6'10", 235 lb center who played at Grand Canyon University before being drafted by the Seattle SuperSonics in the 1976 NBA draft. Forrest never played for the Sonics, but he played one season for Athletes in Action and two seasons for the Phoenix Suns before retiring in 1980 due to injury.

== College career ==
Forrest attended Grand Canyon University, a member of the National Association of Intercollegiate Athletics (NAIA). Forrest declined offers from Oregon State University, Arizona State University, and the University of Hawaii because he wanted to go to a Christian school. Forrest lead Grand Canyon to the 1975 NAIA Division I men's basketball tournament, where they defeated Midwestern State University 65–54 in the championship. In the championship game, Forrest had 16 points, 12 rebounds, six assists, and four blocked shots, and was named the tournament's Most Valuable Player. In his four years at Grand Canyon, he averaged 18 points a game and 12.7 rebounds a game, while shooting 53.5% from the field.

== Professional career ==
Forrest was selected in the second round (19th pick overall) in the 1976 NBA draft by the Seattle SuperSonics. Forrest turned down the Sonics in favor of Athletes in Action and later signed with the Phoenix Suns in 1977.

Forrest served as a back-up for veteran center Alvan Adams in the 1978 and 1979 seasons. The Suns reached the Western Conference Finals in the 1979 NBA Playoffs, which saw Forrest play an expanded with an injured Adams unavailable for the first six games of the series. While in Phoenix, he averaged 15.3 minutes, 4.1 points, 4.2 rebounds and 2.2 assists per game. He retired on June 7, 1980.

Before Forrest was drafted by the Sonics, he was selected by the Phoenix Suns in the third round (54th overall) of the 1975 NBA draft and by the San Antonio Spurs in the 6th round (56th overall) of the 1975 ABA Draft. He chose to play the final season of his college career instead.

== Personal ==
Forrest's nephew, Caleb (born 1986), played four years of college basketball at Washington State University.

== Career statistics ==
Legend
GP	Games played	GS	Games started	MPG	Minutes per game
FG%	Field goal percentage	3P%	3-point field goal percentage	FT%	Free throw percentage
RPG	Rebounds per game	APG	Assists per game	SPG	Steals per game
BPG	Blocks per game	PPG	Points per game	**Bold**	Career high

=== NBA ===
==== Regular season ====
Year	Team	GP	MPG	FG%	FT%	RPG	APG	SPG	BPG	PPG
1977–78	Phoenix	64	13.9	**.466**	.476	3.9	2.0	**.4**	**.5**	**4.2**
1978–79	Phoenix	**75**	**16.6**	.434	**.539**	**4.2**	**2.2**	**.4**	**.5**	4.0
Career		139	15.3	.449	.509	4.1	2.1	.4	.5	4.1

==== Playoffs ====
Year	Team	GP	MPG	FG%	FT%	RPG	APG	SPG	BPG	PPG
1978	Phoenix	1	3.0	**1.000**	–	.0	.0	.0	.0	**2.0**
1979	Phoenix	**14**	**7.9**	.556	**.200**	**2.1**	**.8**	**.3**	**.1**	1.6
Career		15	7.5	.579	.200	1.9	.7	.3	.1	1.6
