= Dwight Boyd =

American basketball player

Memphis Tigers
- Title: Chief of staff
- League: American Athletic Conference

Personal information
- Born: September 19, 1966 (age 60) Memphis, Tennessee, U.S.
- Listed height: 6 ft 3 in (1.91 m)
- Listed weight: 195 lb (88 kg)

Career information
- High school: Kirby (Memphis, Tennessee)
- College: Memphis (1984–1988)
- NBA draft: 1988: 3rd round, 66th overall pick
- Drafted by: Denver Nuggets
- Position: Shooting guard

Career history
- 1989: Rapid City Thrillers
- Stats at Basketball Reference

Dwight Edward Boyd (born September 19, 1966) is an American former professional basketball player who is the chief of staff for the Memphis Tigers. He played college basketball for the Tigers from 1984 to 1988 and was selected in the 1988 NBA draft by the Denver Nuggets. Boyd played professionally for the Rapid City Thrillers in the Continental Basketball Association (CBA).

Boyd spent over 20 years working in the marketing division for PepsiCo. He returned to the University of Memphis in 2012 to work in its athletic department. Boyd was appointed as director of player personnel for the men's basketball team in 2018. He was elevated to chief of staff in 2021.

== High school career ==
Boyd attended Kirby High School in Memphis, Tennessee. He averaged 21.7 points per game during his senior season. He chose to play for the Tigers at the Memphis State University (now University of Memphis) because he would "be better off at home" and lived only 10 minutes away from campus.

== College basketball career ==
Boyd played four seasons with the Tigers from 1984 to 1988. He played with the Tigers in the Final Four of the 1985 NCAA tournament. Boyd averaged a team-high 15.2 points and set a Tigers single-season free throw percentage record (89.5%) during his senior season in 1987–88. He scored 1,249 points during his Tigers career and left the team as its 12th all-time leading scorer.

== Professional basketball career ==
Boyd realized he would not be highly sought after by professional teams after he had a conversation with his father and Tigers head coach Larry Finch during his junior season. He worked as a salesman at a car dealership after he finished his basketball career in May 1988 while he progressed toward achieving his degree in food administration from Memphis State University.

Boyd was expected to be a second round selection in the 1988 NBA draft. He fell to the third round where he was selected by the Denver Nuggets as the 66th pick. Boyd stated in an interview after the draft: "It didn't concern me who drafted me. I just wanted to get the chance to play." He did not report to the Nuggets training camp in October 1988 due to "personal reasons." Boyd was recruited by the Rapid City Thrillers of the Continental Basketball Association (CBA) for the 1988–89 season but he decided to focus on the completion of his degree which he accomplished in 1989.

On May 31, 1989, the Thrillers announced that Boyd had made an oral agreement to play for them during the 1989–90 season. Boyd played for the Nuggets in the Midwest Rookie Review league in 1989 but was not invited to their training camp. He played for the San Antonio Spurs at the Summer Pro League in August 1989. Boyd joined the Thrillers for their training camp in September. He appeared in five games with the Thrillers and averaged 5 points per game. On December 6, Boyd was placed on the reserved list by the Thrillers. On January 13, 1990, his rights were traded to the Cedar Rapids Silver Bullets but the team did not expect Boyd to report.

== Post-playing career ==
Boyd worked at PepsiCo for 22 years in their marketing division.

In 2012, Boyd returned to the University of Memphis as the director of the M Club, the letterwinners association of the athletic department. He moved to the Tiger Scholarship Fund as its assistant athletic director for community relations. Boyd earned his Master of Arts in liberal studies from the University of Memphis in 2015.

In 2018, Boyd was appointed as director of player personnel for the Tigers men's basketball team by head coach Penny Hardaway. His role was to monitor the academic progress of team members and mentor them on their life after basketball. In 2021, he was elevated to the position of chief of staff.

== Personal life ==
Boyd married Lenora Jett on August 29, 1987. His daughter, Lakira, played for the Middle Tennessee Blue Raiders.

Boyd is a Christian.
