= Joe Reaves =

American basketball player

Personal information
- Born: May 27, 1950 (age 76) Bolivar, Tennessee, U.S.
- Listed height: 6 ft 5 in (1.96 m)
- Listed weight: 210 lb (95 kg)

Career information
- High school: Bolivar Central (Bolivar, Tennessee)
- College: Bethel (Tennessee) (1969–1973)
- NBA draft: 1973: 3rd round, 42nd overall pick
- Drafted by: Phoenix Suns
- Position: Small forward
- Number: 24, 25

Career history
- 1973: Phoenix Suns
- 1973–1974: Memphis Tams
- Stats at NBA.com
- Stats at Basketball Reference

Joe L. Reaves (born May 27, 1950) is an American former professional basketball small forward who played parts of the 1973–74 season in both the National Basketball Association (NBA) and the American Basketball Association (ABA). He attended Bethel College where he was drafted in the third round of the 1973 NBA draft by the Phoenix Suns. He played seven games for the Suns until he was waived on November 27, 1973. He later signed with the Memphis Tams of the ABA.

== Career statistics ==
Legend
GP	Games played	GS	Games started	MPG	Minutes per game
FG%	Field goal percentage	3P%	3-point field goal percentage	FT%	Free throw percentage
RPG	Rebounds per game	APG	Assists per game	SPG	Steals per game
BPG	Blocks per game	PPG	Points per game	**Bold**	Career high

=== NBA/ABA ===
==== Regular season ====
Year	Team	GP	MPG	FG%	3P%	FT%	RPG	APG	SPG	BPG	PPG
1973–74	Phoenix (NBA)	7	5.4	**.545**		.364	1.1	.1	.0	.3	2.3
1973–74	Memphis (ABA)	**12**	**14.3**	.429	–	**.667**	**3.8**	**.5**	**.2**	**.6**	**5.3**
Career (overall)		19	11.1	.444	–	.471	2.8	.4	.1	.5	4.2
