= 1988 NBA draft =

Basketball player selection

General information
- Sport: Basketball
- Date: June 28, 1988
- Location: Felt Forum, Madison Square Garden (New York City, New York)
- Network: Superstation TBS

Overview
- 75 total selections in 3 rounds
- League: NBA
- First selection: Danny Manning (Los Angeles Clippers)
- Hall of Famers: 1: SG Mitch Richmond

The 1988 NBA draft took place on June 28, 1988, in New York City, New York. The length was reduced from seven rounds in the previous year to three rounds. This was also the first draft for the Charlotte Hornets and Miami Heat, prior to their inaugural season.

Danny Manning was picked first overall by the Los Angeles Clippers and later became a two-time All-Star and a Sixth Man of the Year winner. However, injuries prevented him from fulfilling his potential, despite playing 15 seasons. Mitch Richmond, the fifth pick, went on to earn six All-Star and five All-NBA team selections, while also winning Rookie of the Year. Other notable selections include All-Stars Rik Smits, Hersey Hawkins and Dan Majerle, as well as nine-time NBA champion Steve Kerr, who achieved championship success as a player (five championships) and as a coach (four championships).

== Draft ==
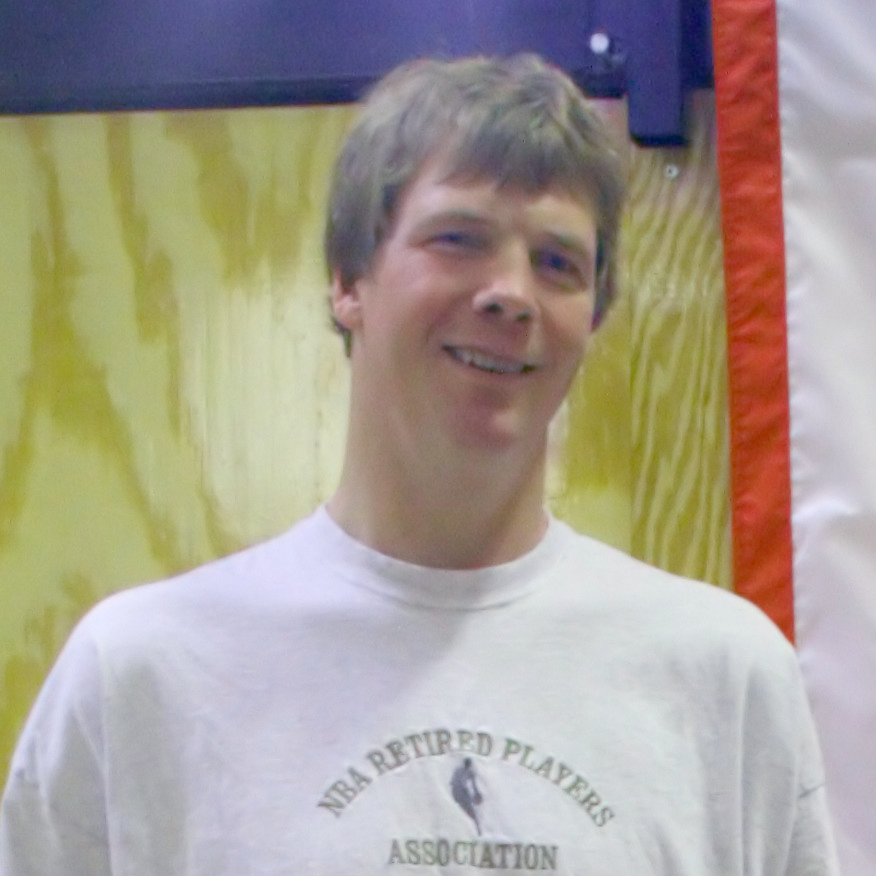
Rik Smits, the 2nd pick

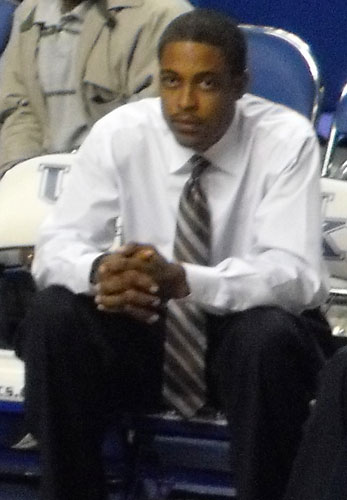
Rod Strickland, the 19th pick

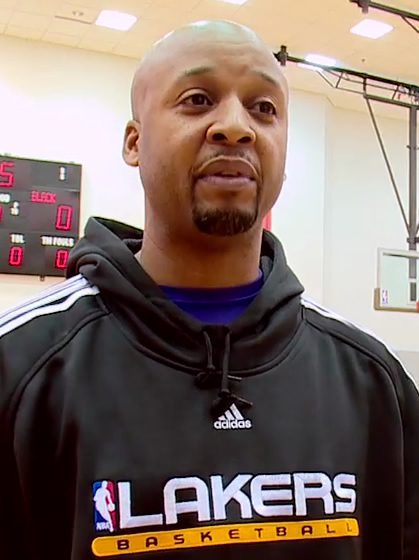
Brian Shaw, the 24th pick

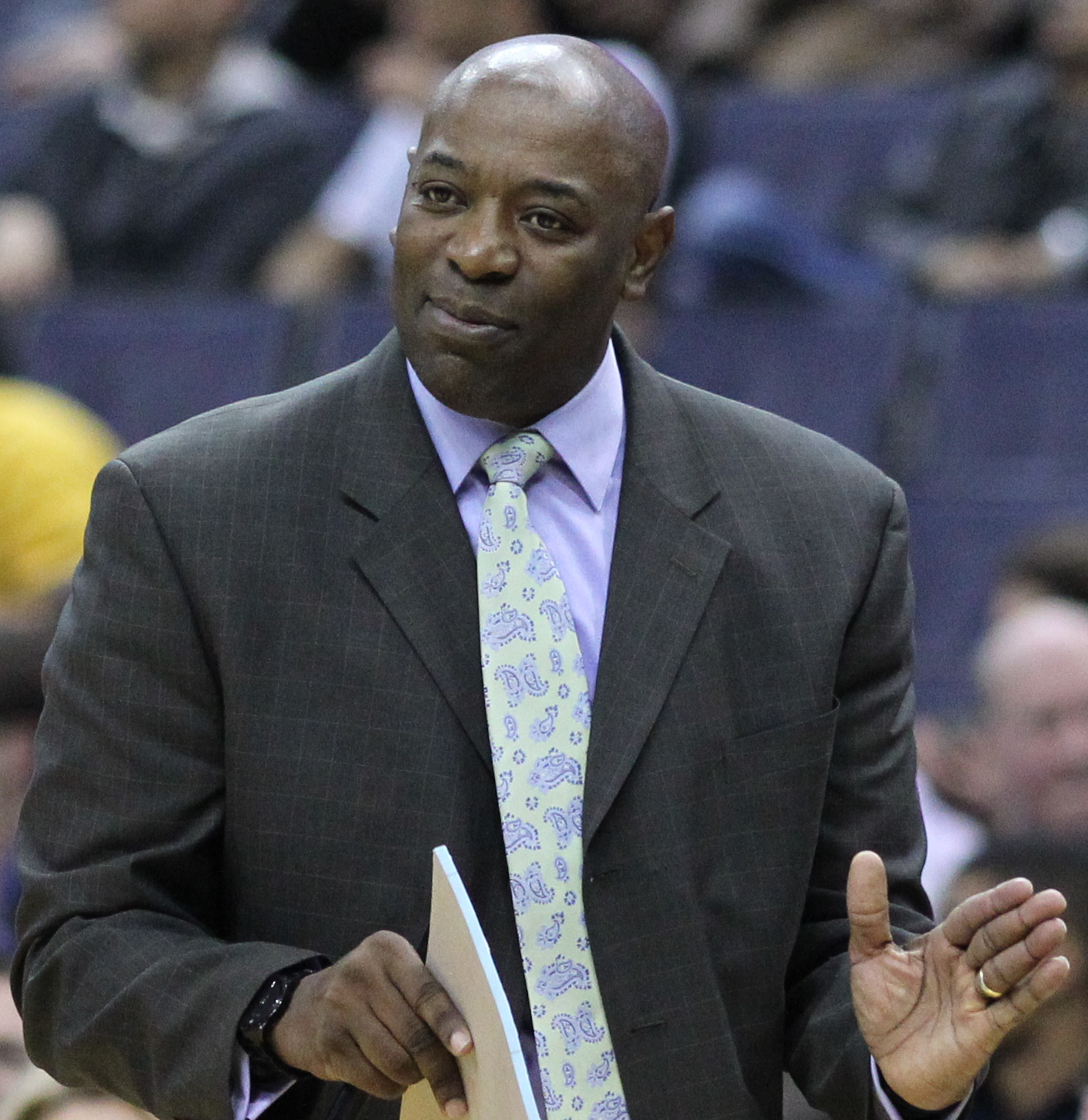
Keith Smart, the 41st pick

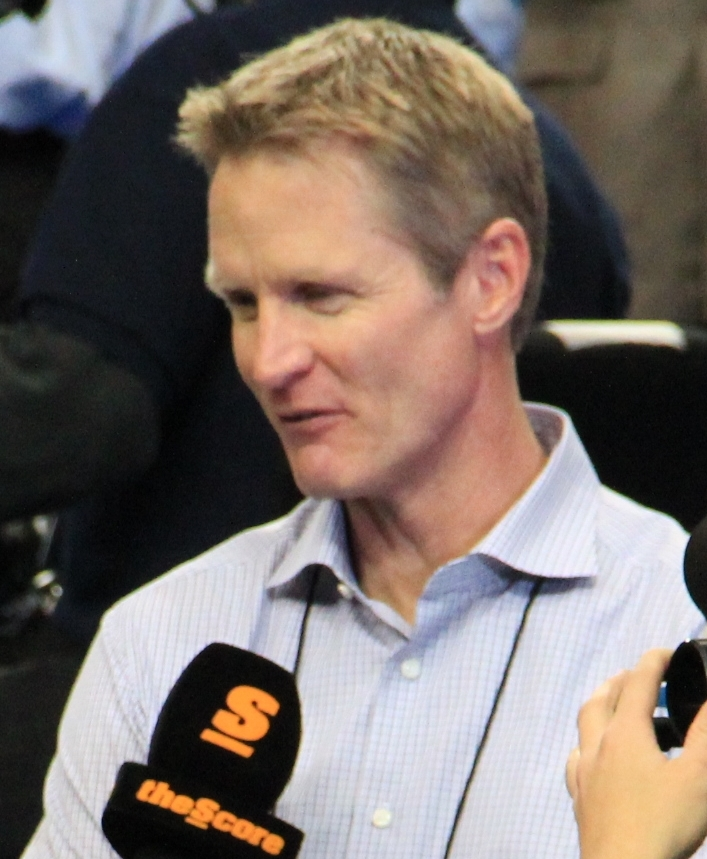
Steve Kerr, the 50th pick

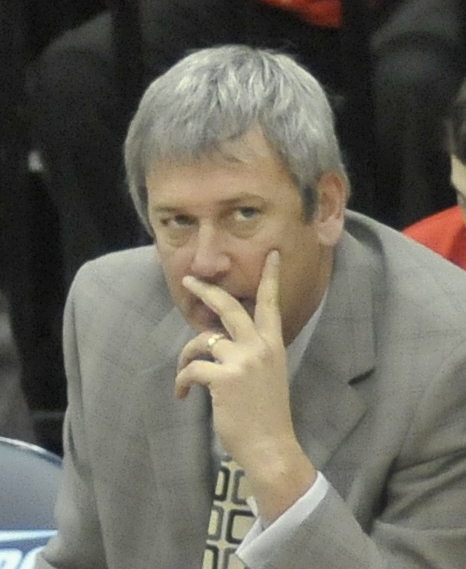
Craig Neal, the 71st pick

PG	Point guard	SG	Shooting guard	SF	Small forward	PF	Power forward	C	Center

^	Denotes player who has been inducted to the Naismith Memorial Basketball Hall of Fame
*	Denotes player who has been selected for at least one All-Star Game and All-NBA Team
^{+}	Denotes player who has been selected for at least one All-Star Game
^{x}	Denotes player who has been selected for at least one All-NBA Team
^{#}	Denotes player who has never appeared in an NBA regular-season or playoff game
^{~}	Denotes player who has been selected as Rookie of the Year

Round	Pick	Player	Position	Nationality (Note: Nationality indicates the player's national team or representative nationality. If a player has not competed at the international level, then the nationality indicates the national team which the player is eligible to represent according to FIBA rules.)	Team	School/club team
1	1	Danny Manning^{+}	PF	United States	Los Angeles Clippers	Kansas (Sr.)
1	2	Rik Smits^{+}	C	Netherlands	Indiana Pacers	Marist (Sr.)
1	3	Charles Smith	PF	United States	Philadelphia 76ers (traded to L.A. Clippers)	Pittsburgh (Sr.)
1	4	Chris Morris	SF	United States	New Jersey Nets	Auburn (Sr.)
1	5	Mitch Richmond^~	SG	United States	Golden State Warriors	Kansas State (Sr.)
1	6	Hersey Hawkins^{+}	SG	United States	Los Angeles Clippers (from Sacramento, traded to Philadelphia)	Bradley (Sr.)
1	7	Tim Perry	F	United States	Phoenix Suns	Temple (Sr.)
1	8	Rex Chapman	SG	United States	Charlotte Hornets	Kentucky (So.)
1	9	Rony Seikaly	C	Lebanon	Miami Heat	Syracuse (Sr.)
1	10	Willie Anderson	SG	United States	San Antonio Spurs	Georgia (Sr.)
1	11	Will Perdue	C	United States	Chicago Bulls (from New York)	Vanderbilt (Sr.)
1	12	Harvey Grant	SF	United States	Washington Bullets	Oklahoma (Sr.)
1	13	Jeff Grayer	SG/SF	United States	Milwaukee Bucks	Iowa State (Sr.)
1	14	Dan Majerle^{+}	SF	United States	Phoenix Suns (from Cleveland)	Central Michigan (Sr.)
1	15	Gary Grant	PG	United States	Seattle SuperSonics	Michigan (Sr.)
1	16	Derrick Chievous	SG	United States	Houston Rockets	Missouri (Sr.)
1	17	Eric Leckner	C	United States	Utah Jazz	Wyoming (Sr.)
1	18	Ricky Berry	SG	United States	Sacramento Kings (from Atlanta)	San Jose State (Sr.)
1	19	Rod Strickland^{x}	PG	United States	New York Knicks (from Chicago)	DePaul (Jr.)
1	20	Kevin Edwards	SG	United States	Miami Heat (from Dallas)^{[a]}	DePaul (Sr.)
1	21	Mark Bryant	PF	United States	Portland Trail Blazers	Seton Hall (Sr.)
1	22	Randolph Keys	SF	United States	Cleveland Cavaliers (from Detroit via Phoenix)	Southern Miss (Sr.)
1	23	Jerome Lane	PF	United States	Denver Nuggets	Pittsburgh (Jr.)
1	24	Brian Shaw	SG	United States	Boston Celtics	UC Santa Barbara (Sr.)
1	25	David Rivers	PG	United States	Los Angeles Lakers	Notre Dame (Sr.)
2	26	Rolando Ferreira	C	Brazil	Portland Trail Blazers	Houston (Sr.)
2	27	Shelton Jones	F	United States	San Antonio Spurs	St. John's (Sr.)
2	28	Andrew Lang	C	United States	Phoenix Suns	Arkansas (Sr.)
2	29	Vinny Del Negro	SG	United States	Sacramento Kings	NC State (Sr.)
2	30	Fennis Dembo	PF	United States	Detroit Pistons	Wyoming (Sr.)
2	31	Everette Stephens	G	United States	Philadelphia 76ers	Purdue (Sr.)
2	32	Charles Shackleford	F/C	United States	New Jersey Nets	NC State (Sr.)
2	33	Grant Long	F	United States	Miami Heat	Eastern Michigan (Sr.)
2	34	Tom Tolbert	F/C	United States	Charlotte Hornets	Arizona (Sr.)
2	35	Sylvester Gray	F	United States	Miami Heat (from New York via Chicago, Seattle, and Boston)^{[b]}	Memphis State (So.)
2	36	Ledell Eackles	G/F	United States	Washington Bullets	New Orleans (Sr.)
2	37	Greg Butler	C	United States	New York Knicks	Stanford (Sr.)
2	38	Dean Garrett	C	United States	Phoenix Suns (from Cleveland)	Indiana (Sr.)
2	39	Tito Horford	C	Dominican Republic	Milwaukee Bucks	Miami (FL) (So.)
2	40	Orlando Graham	F	United States	Miami Heat (from Seattle)^{[c]}	Auburn-Montgomery (Sr.)
2	41	Keith Smart	G	United States	Golden State Warriors	Indiana (Sr.)
2	42	Jeff Moe^{#}	SG	United States	Utah Jazz	Iowa (Sr.)
2	43	Todd Mitchell	F	United States	Denver Nuggets	Purdue (Sr.)
2	44	Anthony Taylor	G	United States	Atlanta Hawks	Oregon (Sr)
2	45	Tom Garrick	G	United States	Los Angeles Clippers	Rhode Island (Sr.)
2	46	Morlon Wiley	G	United States	Dallas Mavericks	Long Beach State (Sr.)
2	47	Vernon Maxwell	SG	United States	Denver Nuggets	Florida (Sr.)
2	48	Micheal Williams	G	United States	Detroit Pistons	Baylor (Sr.)
2	49	José Vargas^{#}	C/PF	Dominican Republic	Dallas Mavericks	LSU (Sr.)
2	50	Steve Kerr	PG	United States	Phoenix Suns	Arizona (Sr.)
3	51	Rob Lock	F	United States	Los Angeles Clippers	Kentucky (Sr.)
3	52	Derrick Hamilton^{#}	SF	United States	New Jersey Nets	Southern Miss (Sr.)
3	53	Anthony Mason*	SF/PF	United States	Portland Trail Blazers (from Golden State)	Tennessee State (Sr.)
3	54	Jorge González^{#}	C	Argentina	Atlanta Hawks (from Sacramento)	Sport Club de Cañada de Gómez (Argentina) 1966
3	55	Rodney Johns^{#}	PG	United States	Phoenix Suns	Grand Canyon (Sr.)
3	56	Barry Sumpter	F/C	United States	San Antonio Spurs	Austin Peay (Sr.)
3	57	Hernán Montenegro^{#}	PF/C	Argentina	Philadelphia 76ers	Olimpo (Argentina)
3	58	Jeff Moore^{#}	PF	United States	Charlotte Hornets	Auburn (Sr.)
3	59	Nate Johnston	F	United States	Miami Heat	Tampa (Sr.)
3	60	Ed Davender^{#}	PG	United States	Washington Bullets	Kentucky (Sr.)
3	61	Herbert Crook ^{#}	SF/SG	United States	Indiana Pacers	Louisville (Sr.)
3	62	Derrick Lewis^{#}	PF	United States	Chicago Bulls (from New York)	Maryland (Sr.)
3	63	Mike Jones^{#}	PF	United States	Milwaukee Bucks	Auburn (Jr.)
3	64	Winston Bennett	F	United States	Cleveland Cavaliers	Kentucky (Sr.)
3	65	Corey Gaines	G	United States	Seattle SuperSonics	Loyola Marymount (Sr.)
3	66	Dwight Boyd^{#}	SG	United States	Denver Nuggets (from Houston)	Memphis State (Sr.)
3	67	Ricky Grace	G	Australia	Utah Jazz	Oklahoma (Sr.)
3	68	Darryl Middleton^{#}	PF	United States	Atlanta Hawks	Baylor (Sr.)
3	69	Phil Stinnie^{#}	PF	United States	New York Knicks (from Chicago)	VCU (Sr.)
3	70	Jerry Johnson^{#}	PG	United States	Dallas Mavericks	Florida Southern (Sr.)
3	71	Craig Neal	G	United States	Portland Trail Blazers	Georgia Tech (Sr.)
3	72	Lee Johnson	PF	United States	Detroit Pistons	Norfolk State (Sr.)
3	73	Michael Anderson	G	United States	Indiana Pacers (from Denver via L.A. Clippers)	Drexel (Sr.)
3	74	Gerald Paddio	F/G	United States	Boston Celtics	UNLV (Sr.)
3	75	Archie Marshall^{#}	SF	United States	San Antonio Spurs (from L.A. Lakers)	Kansas (Sr.)

== Notable undrafted players ==
This section is for players who were eligible for the 1988 NBA draft, did not get selected, but still later appeared in at least one NBA regular season or postseason game.

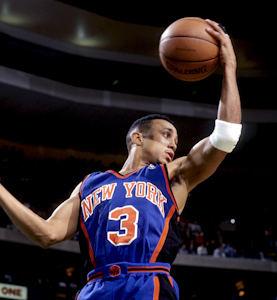
John Starks was undrafted but had a successful career, including an appearance in the 1994 NBA All-Star Game.

Player	Position	Nationality	School/Club team
Lloyd Daniels	SG	United States	Waitemata Dolphins (New Zealand)
Wayne Engelstad	PF	United States	UC Irvine (Sr.)
Duane Ferrell	SF	United States	Georgia Tech (Sr.)
Ben Gillery	C	United States	Georgetown (Sr.)
Henry James	PF/SF	United States	St. Mary's (TX) (Sr.)
Avery Johnson	PG	United States	Southern (Sr.)
Bill Jones	PF	United States	Iowa (Sr.)
Tim Legler	SG	United States	La Salle (Sr.)
Carlton McKinney	SG	United States	SMU (Sr.)
Tracy Moore	SG/SF	United States	Tulsa (Sr.)
Richard Morton	PG	United States	Cal State Fullerton (Sr.)
Žarko Paspalj	SF	Yugoslavia	KK Partizan (Yugoslavia)
Ramon Rivas	C	Puerto Rico	Temple (Sr.)
John Starks^{+}	SG	United States	Oklahoma State (Sr.)
Henry Turner	SG/SF	United States	Cal State Fullerton (Sr.)
João Vianna	PF	Brazil	C.A. Monte Líbano (Brazil)
Gary Voce	PF	Jamaica	Notre Dame (Sr.)

== Notes ==
- ^{a} On June 23, 1988, the Heat received the 1988 NBA Draft first-round draft pick from the Dallas Mavericks for not picking centers Bill Wennington and Uwe Blab or guard Steve Alford in the 1988 NBA expansion draft.
- ^{c} On June 23, 1988, the Heat received the 1988 NBA Draft second-round draft pick from the Seattle SuperSonics for not selecting guard Danny Young in the 1988 NBA Expansion Draft.

== Early entrants ==
=== College underclassmen ===
For the sixth year in a row and the tenth time in eleven years, no college underclassman would withdraw their entry into the NBA draft. Not only that, for the third time in a row, there would be at least one player that qualified for the status of "college underclassman" while playing professional basketball overseas. In this case, three players ended up qualifying for this case with Lloyd Daniels leaving Mt. San Antonio College to play for the Waitemata Dolphins in New Zealand, the Argentinian born Hernán Montenegro leaving Louisiana State University to play for Olimpo de Bahía Blanca in his home land of Argentina, and Eddie Pope leaving the University of Southern Mississippi to play for Saint-Étienne Basket in France. If you include those three players, the number of college underclassmen increases from nine to twelve total players for this year. Regardless, the following college basketball players successfully applied for early draft entrance.

- (United States) Marvin Alexander – F, Memphis (junior)
- (United States) Rex Chapman – G, Kentucky (sophomore)
- (United States) Sylvester Gray – F, Memphis (sophomore)
- (Dominican Republic) Tito Horford – C, Miami (Florida) (sophomore)
- (United States) Mike Jones – F, Auburn (junior)
- (United States) Jerome Lane – F, Pittsburgh (junior)
- (United States) Dwayne Lewis – G, Marshall (junior)
- (United States) Charles Shackleford – F/C, NC State (junior)
- (United States) Rod Strickland – G, DePaul (junior)

=== Other eligible players ===
This would be the third year in a row with at least one player that previously played in college entering the NBA draft as an underclassman. However, it would be the second year in a row where multiple players would qualify for such a feat and the first where none of the underclassmen players would play in Italy after the previous two drafts had a player go to Italy first before being drafted. It was also the second year where a foreign-born player would qualify as an underclassman while also playing for an international team and the first time it happened while said player was playing for what would be considered his home nation.

Player	Team	Note	Ref.
(United States) Lloyd Daniels	Waitemata Dolphins (New Zealand)	Left Mt. San Antonio College in 1987; playing professionally since the 1987–88 season	
(Argentina) Hernán Montenegro	Olimpo de Bahía Blanca (Argentina)	Left LSU in 1987; playing professionally since the 1987–88 season	
(United States) Eddie Pope	Saint-Étienne Basket (France)	Left Southern Miss in 1986; playing professionally since the 1987–88 season	

== Invited attendees ==
The 1988 NBA draft is considered to be the eleventh NBA draft to have utilized what's properly considered the "green room" experience for NBA prospects. The NBA's green room is a staging area where anticipated draftees often sit with their families and representatives, waiting for their names to be called on draft night. Often being positioned either in front of or to the side of the podium (in this case, being positioned in the Madison Square Garden's Felt Forum for the seventh year in a row), once a player heard his name, he would walk to the podium to shake hands and take promotional photos with the NBA commissioner. From there, the players often conducted interviews with various media outlets while backstage. From there, the players often conducted interviews with various media outlets while backstage. However, once the NBA draft started to air nationally on TV starting with the 1980 NBA draft, the green room evolved from players waiting to hear their name called and then shaking hands with these select players who were often called to the hotel to take promotional pictures with the NBA commissioner a day or two after the draft concluded to having players in real-time waiting to hear their names called up and then shaking hands with David Stern, the NBA's commissioner at the time. The NBA compiled its list of green room invites through collective voting by the NBA's team presidents and general managers alike, which in this year's case belonged to only what they believed were the top 17 prospects at the time. Despite the large amount of invites, two notable absences from this group include Dan Majerle from Central Michigan University and Anthony Mason from Tennessee State University, with Shelton Jones waiting into the second round himself. Even so, the following players were invited to attend this year's draft festivities live and in person.

- (United States) Mark Bryant – PF, Seton Hall
- (United States) Rex Chapman – SG, Kentucky
- (United States) Harvey Grant – SF, Oklahoma
- (United States) Gary Grant – PG, Michigan
- (United States) Jeff Grayer – SG/SF, Iowa State
- (United States) Hersey Hawkins – SG, Bradley
- (United States) Shelton Jones – SF, St. John's
- (United States) Danny Manning – PF, Kansas
- (United States) Chris Morris – SF, Auburn
- (United States) Will Perdue – C, Vanderbilt
- (United States) Tim Perry – PF/C, Temple
- (United States) Mitch Richmond – SG, Kansas State
- (United States) David Rivers – PG, Notre Dame
- (Lebanon) / (United States) Rony Seikaly – C, Syracuse
- (United States) Charles Smith – PF, Pittsburgh
- (Netherlands) Rik Smits – C, Marist
- (United States) Rod Strickland – PG, DePaul

== See also ==
- List of first overall NBA draft picks
