= Grand Canyon Antelopes men's basketball =

NCAA Division I team

2026–27 Grand Canyon Antelopes men's basketball team
- University: Grand Canyon University
- Head coach: Bryce Drew (7th season)
- Location: Phoenix, Arizona
- Arena: Global Credit Union Arena (capacity: 7,000)
- Conference: Mountain West
- Nickname: Antelopes
- Colors: Purple, black, and white
- Student section: The Havocs

NCAA Division I tournament round of 32
- Division I: 2024; Division II: 1992, 1993, 1996, 1997, 2007

NCAA Division I tournament appearances
- Division I: 2021, 2023, 2024, 2025; Division II: 1992, 1993, 1994, 1995, 1996, 1997, 1998, 2007, 2012, 2013

NAIA tournament champions
- 1975, 1978, 1988

Conference tournament champions
- CCAA: 1994 WAC: 2021, 2023, 2024, 2025

Conference regular-season champions
- Pacific West: 2007 WAC: 2021, 2024

Uniforms
Home	Away

The Grand Canyon Antelopes men's basketball team represents Grand Canyon University in Phoenix, Arizona. They are a member of the Mountain West Conference. They are led by head coach Bryce Drew and play their home games at Global Credit Union Arena. They made the jump to NCAA Division I and joined the WAC on July 1, 2013. They joined the Mountain West on July 8, 2025, one year earlier than their expected 2026 departure.

During their time as a member of the NAIA, they were national champions in 1975, 1978, and 1988. Since joining Division I in 2013–14, the Antelopes have appeared four times in the NCAA Tournament, most recently in 2025.

== History ==
Grand Canyon College was founded in 1949. In their first year, they hired Howard Mansfield as coach of the Antelopes basketball team, the first sports team sponsored by the school.

The Antelopes played in the National Association of Intercollegiate Athletics (NAIA) through the 1989–90 season before moving up to NCAA Division II for the 1990–91 season.

In March 2013, former Phoenix Suns shooting guard Dan Majerle became the 13th men's basketball coach. Majerle oversaw GCU's transition into NCAA Division I basketball in the WAC. The Antelopes began playing in Division I for the 2013–14 season, and became a full member eligible for postseason play in the 2017–2018 season.

In March 2020, Majerle was fired after seven seasons as head coach of GCU's men's basketball team. In May 2020, Majerle sued the university for breach of contract, alleging that the university did not give reason to terminate him or make any severance payments. The lawsuit was dismissed the following year with an unclear resolution.

On March 17, 2020, Bryce Drew was named the new GCU men's basketball head coach. Immediately prior to arriving at GCU, he was head coach of the Vanderbilt University men's basketball team.

== Postseason ==
=== NCAA Division I tournament results ===
Grand Canyon has appeared in four NCAA Division I tournaments. Their combined record is 1–4.

Year	Seed	Round	Opponent	Result
2021	#15	First Round	#2 Iowa	L 74–86
2023	#14	First Round	#3 Gonzaga	L 70–82
2024	#12	First Round; Second Round	#5 Saint Mary's #4 Alabama	W 75–66; L 61–72
2025	#13	First Round	#4 Maryland	L 49–81

=== NCAA Division II tournament results ===
The Antelopes have appeared in ten NCAA Division II tournaments. Their combined record is 5–10.

Year	Round	Opponent	Result
1992	Regional Quarterfinals; Regional 3rd-place game	UC Riverside; Chico State	L 61–74; W 88–87
1993	Regional Quarterfinals; Regional 3rd-place game	Cal State Bakersfield; Chico State	L 68–98; W 103–98
1994	Regional Quarterfinals	San Francisco State	L 79–84 ^{OT}
1995	Regional Quarterfinals	UC Davis	L 88–92 ^{OT}
1996	Regional Quarterfinals; Regional semifinals	Alaska-Anchorage; Cal State Bakersfield	W 105–96 ^{OT} L 65–71
1997	Regional Quarterfinals; Regional semifinals	UC Davis; Cal State Bakersfield	W 78–66; L 70–80
1998	Regional Quarterfinals	Cal State Los Angeles	L 58–53
2007	Regional Quarterfinals; Regional semifinals	Seattle Pacific; Humboldt State	W 87–65; L 81–95
2012	Regional Quarterfinals	Western Washington	L 73–79
2013	Regional Quarterfinals	Seattle Pacific	L 59–85

=== NAIA tournament results ===
The Antelopes have appeared in 10 NAIA tournaments. Their combined record is 18–7 and they are three-time NAIA national champions (1975, 1978, 1988).

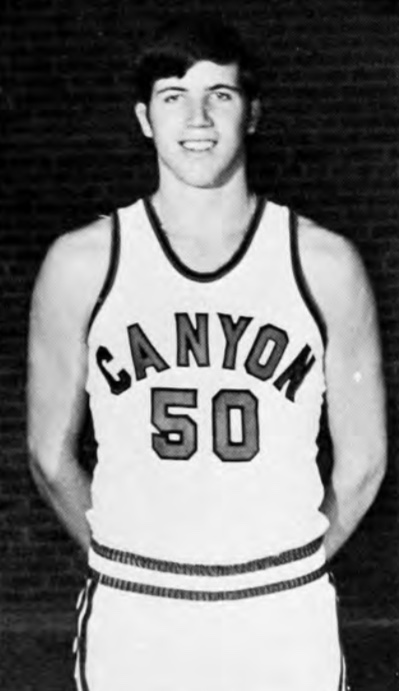
Bayard Forrest led the Antelopes to the 1975 national title.

Year	Round	Opponent	Result
1973	First round	Winona State	L 64–70
1974	First round Second Round	Virginia State; Indiana (PA)	W 67–65; L 65–66
1975	First round Second Round; Quarterfinals; Semifinals; National Championship Game	Willamette; Illinois Wesleyan; Wisconsin-Parkside; Alcorn State; Midwestern State	W 83–60; W 66–63; W 70–54; W 88–68; W 65–54
1976	First round Second Round	Central State (OH); Newberry	W 57–52; L 58–65
1978	First round Second Round; Quarterfinals; Semifinals; National Championship Game	Cumberland; Hawaiʻi-Hilo; Central State (OH); Texas A&M-Commerce; Nebraska-Kearney	W 70–64; W 83–67; W 88–82 ^{5OT} W 74–69; W 79–75
1979	First round	Marymount (KS)	L 74–79
1980	First round	Clarion	L 75–83
1988	First round Second Round; Quarterfinals; Semifinals; National Championship Game	Hastings; Fort Hays State; College of Idaho; Waynesburg; Auburn-Montgomery	W 103–75; W 101–95; W 99–96 ^{OT} W 108–106; W 88–86 ^{OT}
1989	First round	Western Montana	L 65–79
1990	First round Second Round	Briar Cliff; South Carolina-Upstate	W 72–66; L 69–75

=== CIT results ===
The Antelopes have appeared in three Division I CollegeInsider.com Postseason Tournament (CIT) Tournaments. Their combined record is 2–3.

Year	Round	Opponent	Result
2014	First Round	Pacific	L 67–69
2015	First Round	Northern Arizona	L 70–75
2016	First Round; Second Round; Quarterfinals	South Carolina State; Jackson State; Coastal Carolina	W 78–74; W 64–54; L 58–60

=== CBI results ===
The Antelopes have appeared in the Division I College Basketball Invitational (CBI) two times. Their combined record is 0–2.

Year	Round	Opponent	Result
2018	First Round	Mercer	L 73–78
2019	First Round	West Virginia	L 63–77

== Record year-by-year ==
Record table
Season	Coach	Overall	Conference	Standing	Postseason
Grand Canyon (Great Northwest Conference) (1949–1994)
1990–1991	Leighton McCrary	19–11	5–3		
1991–1992	Leighton McCrary	21–7	7–3		
1992–1993	Leighton McCrary	20–11	7–5		
1993–1994	Leighton McCrary	14–15	6–6		
Grand Canyon (California Collegiate Athletic Association) (1994–2004)
1994–1995	Leighton McCrary	17–11	8–4	2nd of 7	NCAA first round
1995–1996	Leighton McCrary	23–6	8–4	2nd of 7	NCAA second round
1996–1997	Leighton McCrary	23–6	9–3	2nd of 7	NCAA second round
1997–1998	Leighton McCrary	17–10	6–6	T–2nd of 7	NCAA first round
1998–1999	Leighton McCrary	16–11	12–10	6th of 12	
1999–2000	Leighton McCrary	15–14	11–11	T–7th of 12	
2000–2001	Leighton McCrary	9–17	9–13	T–8th of 12	
2001–2002	Leighton McCrary	10–17	8–14	9th of 12	
2002–2003	Leighton McCrary	9–18	7–15	9th of 12	
2003–2004	Leighton McCrary	3–24	2–20	12th of 12	
Grand Canyon (Pacific West Conference) (2004–2013)
2004–2005	Scott Mossman	13–16			
2005–2006	Scott Mossman	19–8			
2006–2007	Scott Mossman	21–8	13–2	1st of 7	NCAA second round
2007–2008	Scott Mossman	12–15	6–12	T–5th of 7	
2008–2009	Dan Nichols	14–14	5–7	5th of 7	
2009–2010	Russ Pennell	16–16	10–6	4th of 9	
2010–2011	Russ Pennell	14–12	9–7	4th of 9	
2011–2012	Russ Pennell	19–8	13–5	3rd of 10	NCAA first round
2012–2013	Russ Pennell	23–8	14–4	3rd of 14	NCAA first round
Grand Canyon (Western Athletic Conference) (2013–2025)
2013–14	Dan Majerle	15–15	10–6	3rd	CIT first round
2014–15	Dan Majerle	17–15	8–6	T–2nd	CIT first round
2015–16	Dan Majerle	27–7	11–3	2nd	CIT Quarterfinals
2016–17	Dan Majerle	22–9	11–3	T–2nd	
2017–18	Dan Majerle	22–12	9–5	3rd	CBI First round
2018–19	Dan Majerle	20–14	10–6	3rd	CBI First round
2019–20	Dan Majerle	13–17	8–8	T–5th	
2020–21	Bryce Drew	17–7	9–3	T–1st	NCAA Division I Round of 64
2021–22	Bryce Drew	23–8	13–5	T–4th	
2022–23	Bryce Drew	24–12	11–7	T–4th	NCAA Division I Round of 64
2023–24	Bryce Drew	30–5	17–3	1st	NCAA Division I Round of 32
2024–25	Bryce Drew	26–8	15–3	2nd	NCAA Division I Round of 64
Grand Canyon (Mountain West Conference) (2025–present)
2025–26	Bryce Drew				
Total:		1,220–740	?–??		
National champion Postseason invitational champion Conference regular season champion Conference regular season and conference tournament champion Division regular season champion Division regular season and conference tournament champion Conference tournament champion

* Ineligible for NCAA Tournament during transition to Division I from 2013–2017 seasons.

== Antelopes in the NBA, G League and Summer League ==
8 former Grand Canyon players have played at least one game in the NBA , G League or NBA Summer Camp.

Name	Years Played	Team
Bayard Forrest	1977-1979	Phoenix Suns
Horacio Llamas	1996-1997, 1997-1998	Sioux Falls Skyforce, Phoenix Suns
Sean Miller-Moore	2023-2024	Westchester Knicks
Gabe McGlothan	2024–2025, 2025-2026, 2026- Present	Grand Rapids Gold, Noblesville Boom, Indiana Pacers (Preseason), Maine Celtics
Chance McMillian	2025-2026	Santa Cruz Warriors
Ray Harrison	2025-2026	Long Island Nets
Tyon Grant-Foster	2026	San Antonio Spurs Summer League
Jaden Henley	2026	Detroit Pistons Summer League
