= Grand Canyon University =

Christian university in Phoenix, Arizona, US

Coordinates: 33°30′45″N 112°7′48″W

- Former name: Grand Canyon College (August 1949 – May 1989)
- Motto: Find Your Purpose
- Type: Private university
- Established: August 1, 1949; 77 years ago
- Accreditation: HLC
- Religious affiliation: Non-denominational Christian (formerly Southern Baptist Convention)
- President: Brian Mueller
- Provost: Randy Gibb
- Academic staff: 659 full-time faculty, 6,025 part-time faculty
- Students: 113,257 (fall 2024)
- Undergraduates: 75,936 (fall 2024)
- Postgraduates: 37,321 (fall 2024)
- Location: Phoenix, Arizona, U.S.
- Campus: 300 acres (120 hectares); Large city
- Colors: Purple, black, and white
- Nickname: Antelopes ("Lopes")
- Sporting affiliations: NCAA Division I – Mountain West; MPSF
- Mascot: Thunder the Antelope
- Website: gcu.edu

Grand Canyon University (GCU) is a private Christian university in Phoenix, Arizona, United States. The university offers degrees in over 200 areas of study and is administratively divided into nine colleges. As of 2024, more than 113,000 students were enrolled online and in person, making it one of the largest Christian universities by enrollment.

The Arizona Southern Baptist Convention established the institution in 1949 as Grand Canyon College. During the 1999–2000 academic year, the university ended its affiliation with the Southern Baptist Convention, and became non-denominational Christian. The university competes as the Grand Canyon Antelopes in NCAA Division I athletics as a member of the Mountain West Conference.

Having become the first for-profit Christian college in the United States in 2004, Grand Canyon has faced controversy over its for-profit status, and over its subsequent attempts to be reclassified as non-profit, which were approved by the United States Department of Education in 2025. It has also faced lawsuits from LGBTQ employees over claims of denial of spousal benefits.

== History ==
=== Founding ===
Grand Canyon College was founded as a nonprofit institution in 1949 in Prescott, Arizona, by the Arizona Southern Baptist Convention. The institution was founded so local Baptists could obtain college degrees without going east to a Baptist college in Texas or Oklahoma.

On October 8, 1951, Grand Canyon College relocated to its current location in Phoenix.

In 1984, the college's trustees voted to transition the college to a university for the school's 40th anniversary in 1989, becoming Grand Canyon University. At this time, it also changed governance from the Southern Baptist Convention to the GCU Board of Trustees.

=== For-profit restructuring ===
Suffering financial and other difficulties in the early 21st century, the school's trustees authorized its sale in 2004 to California-based Significant Education, LLC, making it the first for-profit Christian college in the United States. Significant Education was a subsidiary of education entrepreneur Michael K. Clifford's company. Clifford became managing director of the privatized institution, with the former board of trustees serving in an advisory role. Significant Education became a corporation in 2005, publicly traded under the name Grand Canyon Education, Inc. in 2008. GCE trades on NASDAQ under the ticker symbol "LOPE".

After the infusion of capital, Grand Canyon University's size increased. After having fewer than 1,000 students enrolled in 2008, the university had 17,500 students in the spring of 2017. A 2015 economic impact study revealed that the university was adding about $1 billion to the state's economy each year during its expansion. In February 2017, then Arizona Governor Doug Ducey said that the neighborhoods surrounding the university had experienced a 30% increase in housing values and a 30% decrease in crime rates.

By 2014, GCU students' accumulated student loan debt was estimated at more than $5.9 billion.

Citing GCU's controversial for-profit status, Arizona State University initially declined to play against GCU in any sport. ASU eventually reversed its position, and sporting events between the two universities recommenced in 2020.

=== Attempts to return to nonprofit status ===
In the fall of 2014, the college announced the exploration of a return to nonprofit status. GCU's regional accreditation body, the Higher Learning Commission (HLC), initially rejected the university's petition for conversion to nonprofit status in 2016, stating that the school's proposed strategy, particularly its plan to outsource some of its activities (such as curriculum development and student support services) to outside vendors, did not meet the criteria for such a conversion. In 2018, GCU submitted another application to HLC to change to nonprofit status. This application was accepted on July 1, 2018. Although several organizations, including the IRS and the HLC, approved the transition, the U.S. Department of Education continued to classify the university as a for-profit university. The government specifically alleged that GCU was a captive client to Grand Canyon Education and operated for the benefit of a for-profit company's shareholders. Grand Canyon Education has also been accused of engaging in securities law fraud in relation to GCU.

Grand Canyon University was alleged to have switched from for-profit to nonprofit status due to its yearly $9.2 million property tax bill. Numerous school officials said this was unsustainable and a key reason the switch was made. Some critics of for-profit education criticized the relationship between GCU and GCE as too intertwined.

In 2021, a federal judge dismissed a lawsuit by GCU that claimed the university did not receive all the CARES Act relief funds to which it was entitled because it was a nonprofit entity. The same year, GCU sued the U.S. Department of Education after being denied nonprofit status twice. The suit was initially dismissed in 2022 after a federal district judge rejected the university's claims.

In October 2023, a GCU press release alleged that there was a concerted effort by the U.S. Department of Education, Federal Trade Commission, and Department of Veterans Affairs to punish the school for attempting to gain nonprofit status.

In November 2024, the United States Court of Appeals for the Ninth Circuit overturned the district judge's decision and ruled, by a unanimous 3–0 decision, that the U.S. Department of Education erred in denying GCU nonprofit status by applying the wrong standard of assessment. The Department of Education was ordered to reevaluate according to a different standard and the university was reclassified in December 2025 as a not-for-profit institution.

=== Regulatory sanctions ===
In 2008, the federal government sued GCU for paying enrollment counselors according to how many students they had enrolled while at the same time accepting federal financial aid, a violation of the Department of Education's incentive compensation ban. GCU reached a settlement in the case, and was forced to pay a $5.2 million fine to a former employee and the government.

In 2023 the Department of Education fined the company $37.7 million for deceiving students about the cost of doctoral degrees. The department alleged that 78% of students graduating in those programs paid about 25% more than the cost that GCU represented, with much of the extra charges accumulating from additional "continuation classes" for completing the dissertation requirement; only 2% paid the represented cost. The school disputed the allegation, claiming in addition that it provides more information than is legally required. In addition to the fine, the department imposed conditions on the school to continue participating in the federal student aid programs. In May 2025, the Department of Education rescinded the fine, following an executive order by Donald Trump directing the closure of the department, though a class action lawsuit representing doctoral students was allowed to continue.

Also in 2023, the Federal Trade Commission (FTC) filed a federal lawsuit alleging that GCU deceived prospective doctoral students about the cost of its program and its for-profit status. The suit asserted that GCU paid 60% of its revenues to the for-profit Grand Canyon Education company and was the company's most significant source of revenue. The university and company had the same CEO. In August 2025, the FTC dropped the lawsuit after a unanimous 3-0 vote.

== Campuses ==
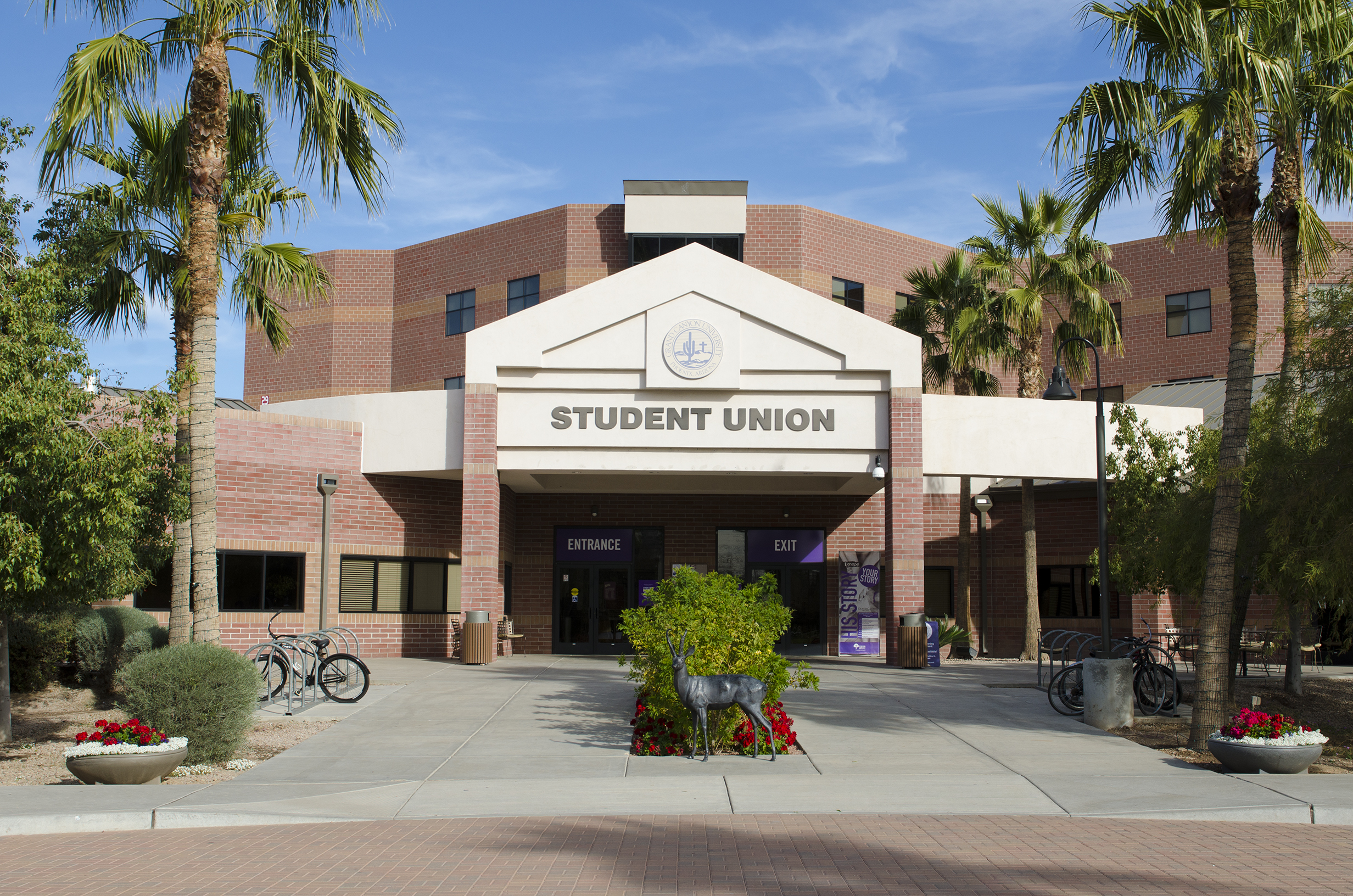
Student Union on Camelback Road

=== Main campus in Phoenix ===
In 2006, the college spent $150 million to renovate the campus, adding a brick promenade, an aquatics center, and a café.

In 2009, GCU began work on a $60 million campus expansion project, including a 500-bed dormitory, a 55,000-square-foot (5,100 m^{2}) fitness and recreation center, 125-classroom facility, food court and bowling alley, and a 5,000-seat arena. The GCU Arena, which opened on September 2, 2011, is used for concerts, speakers, and other events. The arena is also home to the college's men's and women's basketball teams and women's volleyball games. The arena was expanded to 7,000 seats in 2014. GCU offers several fast food restaurants, coffee shops, student union, cafeteria, video game room, and six-lane bowling alley for student recreation. In August 2016, the university announced the establishment of the GCU Police Department.

In August 2016, GCU announced its 10 in 2 initiative, the building of 10 on-campus athletic facilities in a two-year span. Highlights of the project included new facilities for the university's soccer, baseball, softball, tennis and beach volleyball programs. It also included a sports medicine expansion, an equipment room expansion, practice facilities for the basketball and golf programs, and a student-athlete academic center.

=== Accelerated Nursing learning sites ===
In 2020, the university opened its first two Accelerated Nursing (ABSN) locations, in Sun City and Tucson.

On May 9, 2022, GCU opened an ABSN location in Sandy, Utah.

GCU's fourth ABSN location is in Henderson, Nevada.

On September 7, 2023, GCU announced the opening of its fifth ABSN location in Chandler, Arizona.

GCU opened its 6th ABSN location, in Phoenix's West Valley, with a grand opening ceremony on September 18, 2023.

Another ABSN satellite campus is in Meridian, Idaho.

The eighth and most recently opened ABSN location is in St. Louis, Missouri.

== Academics ==
Grand Canyon University offers over 200 bachelor's, master's, and doctoral degree programs through its 10 colleges:

- Colangelo College of Business
- College of Doctoral Studies
- College of Education
- College of Engineering, and Technology
- College of Arts and Media
- College of Humanities and Social Sciences
- College of Nursing and Health Care Professions
- College of Natural Sciences
- College of Theology
- Honors College

In the fall of 2016, the university opened an online seminary. In the fall of 2023, the seminary began offering in-person courses as well.

In April 2017, Arizona nursing board officials censured GCU after the school's nursing programs fell below 80% graduation rate for two consecutive years. GCU said it would implement a plan to increase graduation rates. Three months later, the nursing board announced it was pleased with the "tremendous improvements" the university had shown to addressing all concerns. In 2018, the Arizona State Board of Nursing censured GCU's nursing program due to the number of first-time students failing to pass the registered nursing exam and after numerous complaints by students and faculty. In the second quarter of 2018, GCU nursing students posted a 95.65% first-time pass rate on the National Council Licensure Examination (NCLEX). This led to a year-to-date rate of 92.86%, higher than the Arizona Board of Nursing's year-to-date statewide average of 91.89%.

== Athletics ==
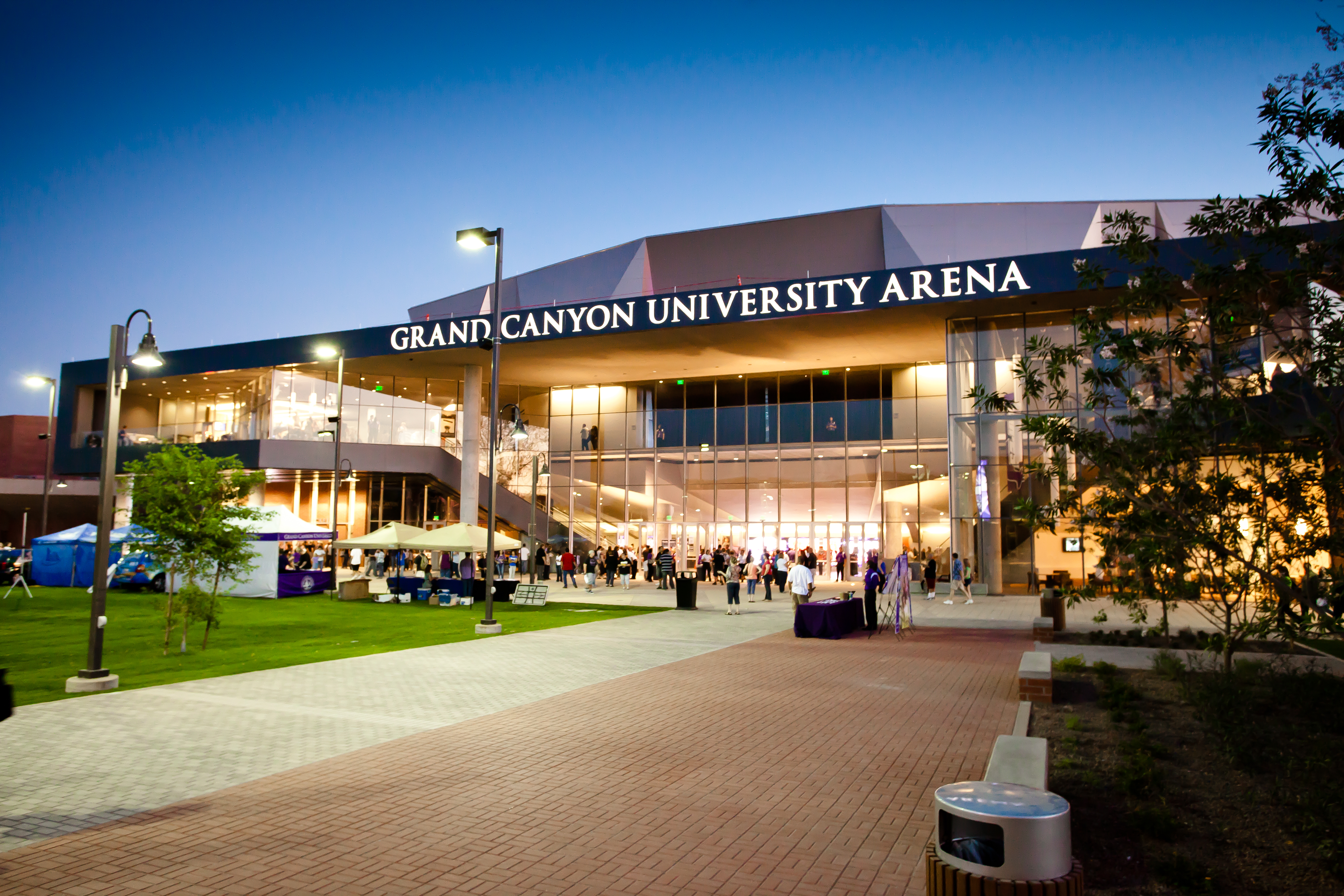
Global Credit Union Arena is GCU's primary athletic venue for basketball and volleyball.

Grand Canyon is primarily a member of the Mountain West Conference, joining for the 2025–26 academic year. GCU was previously in the Western Athletic Conference for 12 years, joining for the 2013–14 academic year. Of GCU's 20 athletic programs, 19 compete in the Mountain West with beach volleyball playing in the Mountain Pacific Sports Federation.

On May 10, 2024, GCU announced it would be moving to the West Coast Conference for its primary conference affiliation beginning in July 2025. Following WCC flagship school Gonzaga's departure from the WCC, GCU declined its invitation to the conference and announced a move to the Mountain West Conference on November 1, 2024, for no later than 2026. GCU joined the conference on July 8, 2025.

During its 12 years in the WAC, GCU was the conference's most successful athletics program by winning the WAC Commissioner's Cup seven times from 2017 to 2025. GCU claimed 76 conference championships while in the WAC.

GCU has won 10 national championships with two coming at the NCAA Division II level and eight as members of NAIA with three in men's basketball, four in baseball and one in women's tennis.

For men's basketball, Global Credit Union Arena has been filled above capacity and GCU's student section, the Havocs, has gained national notoriety as "the biggest party in college basketball." College basketball hall of fame coach Rick Pitino called GCU the "toughest crowd I've ever faced" after his team won by nine at GCU on December 3, 2016.

GCU has sponsored intercollegiate athletics since the school's inception in 1949, starting with just men's basketball. It was an NAIA member until 1990, NCAA Division II until 2013 and has been NCAA Division I since 2013.

Grand Canyon also offers a large club sports offering.

=== Roller hockey ===
GCU Roller Hockey's inaugural season took place during 2022–23. The team and program were established by Aydin Schwetz in the summer of 2022. GCU Roller Hockey is a member of the NCRHA Division I, with the majority of their games played in the Western Collegiate Roller Hockey League. The on-campus roller hockey rink at Grand Canyon University was fully funded by the NHL Arizona Coyotes.

In only its second season (2023–24), the GCU Lopes emerged as the NCRHA Division I Champions. They triumphed over the undefeated Lindenwood Lions with a 2–1 victory in triple-overtime. The championship game was held on April 20, 2024, at the Norway Savings Bank Arena in Auburn, Maine.

== Accreditation, rankings, and statistics ==
Academic rankings

National
- U.S. News & World Report: 392-434
- Washington Monthly: 193

Grand Canyon University is accredited by the Higher Learning Commission (HLC). According to the HLC, Grand Canyon College entered candidacy for accreditation in 1961. By 1968 the school was regionally accredited by the North Central Association of Colleges and Schools, HLC's predecessor. It successfully renewed its 10-year comprehensive evaluation in 2017. GCU colleges and programs also hold additional accreditations from the Accreditation Council for Business Schools and Programs (ACBSP), the Commission on Collegiate Nursing Education (CCNE), the Arizona State Board of Education, and the Commission on Accreditation of Athletic Training Education (CAATE).

In 2025, U.S. News & World Report ranked GCU No.392-434 out of 436 "National Universities".

In 2024, Washington Monthly ranked Grand Canyon University 193rd among 438 national universities in the U.S. based on Grand Canyon's contribution to the public good, as measured by social mobility, research, and promoting public service.

In the 2024/2025 academic year, the university's acceptance rate for undergraduate programs was 78.9%, and, of those admitted, 18% enrolled. The freshman retention rate was 61%.

== LGBTQ issues ==
In 2015, the ACLU of Arizona advocated on behalf of two Grand Canyon University employees whose same-sex spouses were denied health insurance and other employee spouse benefits. In response, Grand Canyon University changed its policy to allow employees in same-sex marriages to receive equal marriage benefits, and reiterated its "sincerely held religious belief that marriage is a sacred union between a man and a woman."

The College of Theology does not outright ban LGBTQ students, but theology students are required to follow a code of conduct that prohibits sexual activity outside of heterosexual marriage.

== Notable alumni ==
- Anthony Birchak, wrestler and mixed martial artist
- Asnage Castelly, Olympic wrestler
- Henry Cejudo, mixed martial artist
- Chad Curtis, professional baseball player
- Bill Engvall, comedian
- Efraín Escudero, wrestler and mixed martial artist
- Tiffany Espensen, actress
- Bayard Forrest, professional basketball player
- Grandy Glaze, professional basketball player
- Steve Green, musician
- Blake Hawksworth, professional baseball player
- Niki Jackson, professional soccer player
- Killian Larson, professional basketball player
- Horacio Llamas, professional basketball player
- Randy McCament, professional baseball player
- Josh McDermitt, actor and comedian
- Rachel Mitchell, attorney
- Pierson Ohl, professional baseball player
- Cody Ransom, professional baseball player
- Tim Salmon, professional baseball player
- Ina Salter, politician and educator
- Rick Singer, organizer of the Varsity Blues scandal
- Moriah Smallbone (née Peters), musician
- Randy Soderman, professional soccer player
- Quentin Stanerson, politician
- David Stapleton, professional baseball player
- Zac Thornton, professional baseball player
- Kevin Warren, professional football executive and college athletics commissioner
- Christine Weidinger, operatic soprano
- James White, theologian and minister
- Jack Wilson, professional baseball player
- Jacob Wilson, professional baseball player
