= 2005 in basketball =

The following are the basketball events of the year 2005 throughout the world.

== Championships ==
=== Professional ===
- Men
  - NBA: San Antonio Spurs over the Detroit Pistons 4-3. MVP: Tim Duncan
    - See also 2004–05 NBA season, 2005 NBA Playoffs, 2005 NBA Finals, 2005 NBA draft, 2005 NBA All-Star Game
  - EuroBasket 2005: Greece 78, Germany 62
  - EuroLeague:
    - Maccabi Tel Aviv defeated TAU Cerámica 90-78 in the final
  - Philippine Basketball Association 2004–05 season:
    - Barangay Ginebra Kings over the Talk N' Text Phone Pals 4-2 in the Philippine Cup Finals
    - San Miguel Beermen over the Talk N' Text Phone Pals 4-1 in the Fiesta Conference Finals
- Women
  - WNBA: Sacramento Monarchs over the Connecticut Sun 3-1. MVP: Yolanda Griffith
    - see also 2005 WNBA season, 2005 WNBA Playoffs, 2005 WNBA Finals, 2005 WNBA draft, 2005 WNBA All-Star Game
  - Eurobasket Women: Czech Republic 72, Russia 70

=== College ===
- Men
  - (United States) NCAA
    - NCAA Division I: North Carolina 75, Illinois 70
    - NIT: South Carolina 60, Saint Joseph's 57
    - NCAA Division II: Virginia Union 63, Bryant 58
    - NCAA Division III: Wisconsin–Stevens Point 73, Rochester 49
  - (United States) NAIA
    - NAIA Division I John Brown (Ark.) 65, Azusa Pacific (Cal.) 55
    - NAIA Division II Walsh (Ohio) 81, Concordia (Neb.) 70
- Women
  - (United States) NCAA
    - NCAA Division I: Baylor 84, Michigan State 62
    - WNIT: Southwest Missouri State 78, West Virginia 70
    - NCAA Division II: Washburn 70, Seattle Pacific 53
    - NCAA Division III: Millikin 70, Randolph-Macon 50
  - (United States) NAIA
    - NAIA Division I Union (Tenn.) 67, Oklahoma City 63
    - NAIA Division II Morningside (Iowa) 75, Cedarville (Ohio) 65
  - (United States) NJCAA
    - Division I: Central Arizona College Coolidge, Ariz. 83, College of Southern Idaho, Twin Falls 50
    - Division II: Monroe Community College, N.Y 62, Illinois Central College, East Peoria, Ill. 46
    - Division III: Anoka-Ramsey Community College, Minn 64, Monroe College, New York 60
- Philippines
  - (Philippines) UAAP
    - UAAP Men's: FEU Tamaraws over La Salle Green Archers, 2-0
    - NCAA Seniors: Letran Knights over PCU Dolphins, 2-1
    - UAAP Women's: Ateneo Lady Eagles over Adamson Lady Falcons 2-0
    - NCAA Juniors: San Sebastian Staglets over San Beda Red Cubs 2-0
    - UAAP Juniors: DLSZ Junior Archers over UPIS Junior Maroons 2-0

== Awards and honors ==
=== Naismith Memorial Basketball Hall of Fame ===
- Class of 2005:
  - Jim Boeheim
  - Hubert "Hubie" Brown
  - Jim Calhoun
  - Sue Gunter
  - Hortencia de Fatima Marcari

=== Women's Basketball Hall of Fame ===
- Class of 2005
  - Joe Ciampi
  - Kelli Litsch
  - Hunter Low
  - Edna Tarbutton
  - Dixie Woodall
  - Lynette Woodard

=== Professional ===
  - Men
    - NBA Most Valuable Player Award: Steve Nash
    - NBA Rookie of the Year Award: Emeka Okafor
    - NBA Defensive Player of the Year Award: Ben Wallace
    - FIBA Europe Player of the Year Award: Dirk Nowitzki, Dallas Mavericks and Germany
    - Euroscar: Dirk Nowitzki, Dallas Mavericks and Germany
    - Mr. Europa: Dirk Nowitzki, Dallas Mavericks and Germany
  - Women
    - WNBA Most Valuable Player Award: Sheryl Swoopes, Houston Comets
    - WNBA Defensive Player of the Year Award: Tamika Catchings, Indiana Fever
    - WNBA Rookie of the Year Award: Temeka Johnson, Washington Mystics
    - WNBA Most Improved Player Award: Nicole Powell, Sacramento Monarchs
    - Kim Perrot Sportsmanship Award: Taj McWilliams-Franklin, Connecticut Sun
    - WNBA Coach of the Year Award: John Whisenant, Sacramento Monarchs
    - WNBA All-Star Game MVP: Sheryl Swoopes, Houston Comets
    - WNBA Finals Most Valuable Player Award: Yolanda Griffith, Sacramento Monarchs
    - FIBA Europe Player of the Year Award: Maria Stepanova, CSKA Samara, Connecticut Sun, and Russia

=== Collegiate ===
- Combined
  - Legends of Coaching Award: Jim Calhoun, Connecticut
- Men
  - John R. Wooden Award: Andrew Bogut, Utah
  - Naismith College Coach of the Year: Bruce Weber, Illinois
  - Frances Pomeroy Naismith Award: Nate Robinson, Washington
  - Associated Press College Basketball Player of the Year: Andrew Bogut, Utah
  - NCAA basketball tournament Most Outstanding Player: Joakim Noah, Florida
  - USBWA National Freshman of the Year: Marvin Williams, North Carolina
  - Associated Press College Basketball Coach of the Year: Tubby Smith, Kentucky
  - Naismith Outstanding Contribution to Basketball: Everett Case
- Women
  - John R. Wooden Award: Seimone Augustus, LSU
  - Naismith College Player of the Year: Seimone Augustus, LSU
  - Naismith College Coach of the Year: Pokey Chatman, LSU
  - Wade Trophy: Seimone Augustus, LSU
  - Frances Pomeroy Naismith Award: Tan White, Mississippi State
  - Associated Press Women's College Basketball Player of the Year: Seimone Augustus, LSU
  - NCAA basketball tournament Most Outstanding Player: Sophia Young, Baylor
  - Basketball Academic All-America Team: Kate Endress, Ball State
  - Carol Eckman Award: Bonnie Henrickson, Kansas
  - USBWA National Freshman of the Year: Candice Wiggins, Stanford
  - USBWA National Freshman of the Year: Tasha Humphrey, Georgia
  - Associated Press College Basketball Coach of the Year: Joanne P. McCallie, Michigan State
  - List of Senior CLASS Award women's basketball winners: Kendra Wecker, Kansas State
  - Nancy Lieberman Award: Temeka Johnson, LSU
  - Naismith Outstanding Contribution to Basketball: Leon Barmore

== Movies ==
- Coach Carter
- Rebound (film)

== Deaths ==
- March 17 — Norm Mager, NBA player (Baltimore Bullets) and college champion (CCNY) (born 1926)
- March 19 – Greg Cook, American college player (LSU) (born 1958)
- April 11 — Doug Peden, Canadian Olympic silver medalist (1936) (born 1916)
- April 14 — Chet Aubuchon, American BAA player (Detroit Falcons) (born 1916)
- April 18 — Clarence Gaines, Basketball Hall of Fame coach (born 1923)
- May 1 — George Mikan, Basketball Hall of Fame player (born 1924)
- June 4 — Banks McFadden, American college coach (Clemson Tigers) (born 1917)
- June 29 — Marc Freiberger, American Olympic gold medalist (1952) (born 1928)
- August 4 — Sue Gunter, women's coach for Louisiana State University for 22 seasons (born 1939)
- August 16 — Aleksandr Gomelsky, Basketball Hall of Fame coach (born 1928)
- August 18 — Kenyon Jones, American player (born 1977)
- August 25 — Teo Cruz, Puerto Rican BSN player, five-time Olympian (born 1942)
- September 5 — Hank Anderson, American college coach (Gonzaga, Montana State) (born 1920)
- September 22 — Lee Huber, American NBL player (Akron Goodyear Wingfoots) (born 1919)
- September 26 — Shawntinice Polk, Arizona Wildcats women's player (born 1983)
- October 12 — Erwin Graf, American NBL player (Sheboygan Red Skins) (born 1917)
- October 15 — Jason Collier, Atlanta Hawks center (born 1977)
- November 23 — Nate Hawthorne, NBA player (Los Angeles Lakers, Phoenix Suns) (born 1951)
- December 18 — Bill Coulthard, Canadian Olympic player (1952) (born 1923)
- December 27 — Giancarlo Primo, Italian coach and FIBA Hall of Fame member (born 1924)

== See also ==
- Timeline of women's basketball
