= 2015 NAIA Division I men's basketball tournament =

- Teams: 32
- Finals site: Municipal Auditorium; Kansas City, Missouri
- Champions: Dalton State (1 title, 1 title game, 1 Fab Four)
- Runner-up: Westmont (1 title game, 1 Fab Four)
- Semifinalists: Taladega (1 Final Four); Hope International (1 Final Four)

The 2015 Buffalo Funds - NAIA Division I men's basketball tournament was held in March at Municipal Auditorium in Kansas City, Missouri. The 78th annual NAIA basketball tournament featured 32 teams playing in a single-elimination format. 2015 tournament would bring four new teams to the NAIA national semifinals. The first tournament since 2005 tournament to do so. (It would be the 8th time in tournament history this has happened; previous years were the inaugural year 1937, 1945, 1947, 1965, 1969, 2001, 2005). As of 2018, it is the most recent tournament to do so.

== 2015 awards ==
- Most consecutive tournament appearances: 24th, Georgetown (KY)
- Most tournament appearances: 34th, Georgetown (KY)

== Bracket ==
First round | Second round
1 | Hope International | 70
WVU Tech | 67
1 | Hope International | 82
Montana Western | 72
16 | Benedictine | 77
Montana Western | 80
Naismith Bracket
9 | LSU Alexandria | 47
Cumberlands | 55
Cumberlands | 59
8 | Martin Methodist | 73
Southwestern Assemblies of God University | 56
8 | Martin Methodist | 74
5 | Campbellsville | 88
LSU Shreveport | 80
5 | Campbellsville | 61
Westmont | 65
Westmont | 77
12 | Lewis-Clark State | 60
Cramer Bracket
13 | Mid-America Christian | 84
Xavier (Louisiana) | 70
13 | Mid-America Christian | 81
Missouri Valley | 72
Missouri Valley | '71*
4 | Freed-Hardeman | 69
3 | Cal State San Marcos | 85
Philander Smith | 79
3 | Cal State San Marcos | 61
Arizona Christian | 59
Arizona Christian | 94
14 | Georgetown | 82
Duer Bracket
11 | Wayland Baptist | 66
Evangel | 67
Evangel | 74
6 | Dalton State | 85
Wiley College | 86
6 | Dalton State | 97
7 | Pikeville | 94
Bethel University (TN) | 86
7 | Pikeville | 97*
10 | Concordia | 93
Oklahoma City University | 62
10 | Concordia (CA) | 74
Lister Bracket
15 | Columbia | 68
Our Lady of the Lake | 74
Our Lady of the Lake | 70
2 | Talladega | 79
Rocky Mountain | 63
2 | Talladega | 74

Quarterfinals
1 | Hope International | 74
8 | Martin Methodist | 62
Westmont | 78
13 | Mid-America Christian | 66
3 | Cal State San Marcos | 76
6 | Dalton State | 80*
7 | Pikeville | 62
2 | Talladega | 64

Semifinals
1 | Hope International | 69
Westmont | 70
6 | Dalton State | 64
2 | Talladega | 54

NAIA national championship
Westmont | 53
6 | Dalton State | 71

- denotes overtime

== See also ==
- 2015 NAIA Division I women's basketball tournament
- 2015 NCAA Division I men's basketball tournament
- 2015 NCAA Division II men's basketball tournament
- 2015 NCAA Division III men's basketball tournament
- 2015 NAIA Division II men's basketball tournament
