= 2005 National Invitation Tournament =

Annual NCAA basketball competition

- Season: 2004–05
- Teams: 40
- Finals site: Madison Square Garden, New York City
- Champions: South Carolina Gamecocks (1st title)
- Runner-up: Saint Joseph's Hawks (2nd title game)
- Semifinalists: Maryland Terrapins (2nd semifinal); Memphis Tigers (4th semifinal)
- Winning coach: Dave Odom (2nd title)
- MVP: Carlos Powell (South Carolina)

The 2005 National Invitation Tournament was the 2005 edition of the annual NCAA college basketball competition. South Carolina defeated Saint Joseph's, 60–57, to earn the program's first NIT title.

== Selected teams ==
Below is a list of the 40 teams selected for the tournament.

School	Conference	Record	Appearance	Last bid
Arizona State	Pac-10	18–12	9th	2002
Boston University	America East	20–8	5th	2004
Buffalo	MAC	22–9	1st	Never
Cal State Fullerton	Big West	19–10	3rd	1987
Clemson	ACC	16–15	12th	1999
Davidson	Southern	21–8	4th	1996
Denver	Sun Belt	20–10	2nd	1959
DePaul	C-USA	19–10	15th	2003
Drexel	CAA	17–11	4th	2004
Georgetown	Big East	17–12	19th	2003
Hofstra	Colonial	21–8	2nd	1999
Holy Cross	Patriot	24–6	12th	1990
Houston	C-USA	18–13	8th	2002
Indiana	Big Ten	15–13	4th	1985
Kent State	MAC	20–12	7th	2004
Marquette	C-USA	19–11	15th	2004
Maryland	ACC	16–12	5th	1990
Memphis	C-USA	19–15	16th	2002
Miami (FL)	ACC	16–12	7th	2001
Miami (OH)	MAC	19–10	5th	1996
Missouri	Big 12	16–16	7th	2004
Northeastern	America East	21–9	1st	Never
Notre Dame	Big East	17–11	9th	2004
Oral Roberts	Mid-Con	25–7	7th	1997
Oregon State	Pac-10	18–14	4th	1987
Rice	WAC	19–11	5th	2004
Saint Joseph's	Atlantic 10	19–11	13th	2002
San Francisco	West Coast	16–13	5th	1976
South Carolina	SEC	15–13	9th	2002
Southwest Missouri State	Missouri Valley	18–12	6th	2000
Temple	Atlantic 10	16–13	16th	2004
Texas A&M	Big 12	19–9	6th	1994
TCU	C-USA	19–13	6th	1999
UNLV	Mountain West	16–13	9th	2004
Vanderbilt	SEC	18–13	10th	2002
VCU	Colonial	19–12	4th	1993
Virginia Tech	ACC	15–13	8th	1995
Western Kentucky	Sun Belt	21–8	12th	1992
Western Michigan	MAC	19–12	3rd	2003
Wichita State	Missouri Valley	20–9	10th	2004

== Bracket ==
Below are the four first round brackets, along with the four-team championship bracket.

Opening Round
Davidson	77
VCU	62
SW Missouri State	105
Rice	82

First Round
Western Michigan	54
Marquette	40
TCU	60
Miami (OH)	58
Maryland	85
Oral Roberts	72
Davidson	82
SW Missouri State	71

Second Round
Western Michigan	76
TCU	78^{OT}
Maryland	78
Davidson	63

Quarterfinals
TCU	73
Maryland	85

Opening Round
Cal State Fullerton	85
Oregon State	83
San Francisco	69
Denver	67

First Round
Cal State Fullerton	85
San Francisco	69
Georgetown	64
Boston University	34
UNLV	89
Arizona State	78
South Carolina	69
Miami (FL)	67

Second Round
Cal State Fullerton	57
Georgetown	74
UNLV	66
South Carolina	77

Quarterfinals
Georgetown	66
South Carolina	69

Opening Round
Wichita State	85
Houston	69
Western Kentucky	88
Kent State	80^{OT}

First Round
Memphis	90
Northeastern	65
Virginia Tech	60
Temple	50
Vanderbilt	67
Indiana	60
Wichita State	84
Western Kentucky	81

Second Round
Memphis	83
Virginia Tech	62
Vanderbilt	65
Wichita State	63

Quarterfinals
Memphis	81
Vanderbilt	68

Opening Round
Saint Joseph's	53
Hofstra	44
Buffalo	81
Drexel	76^{OT}

First Round
Saint Joseph's	55
Buffalo	50
Holy Cross	78
Notre Dame	73
Texas A&M	82
Clemson	74
DePaul	75
Missouri	70

Second Round
Saint Joseph's	68
Holy Cross	60
Texas A&M	75
DePaul	72

Quarterfinals
Saint Joseph's	58
Texas A&M	51

=== Semifinals & finals ===
Semifinals
Maryland	67
South Carolina	75
Saint Joseph's	70
Memphis	58

Finals
South Carolina	60
Saint Joseph's	57

== See also ==
- 2005 Women's National Invitation Tournament
- 2005 NCAA Division I men's basketball tournament
- 2005 NCAA Division II men's basketball tournament
- 2005 NCAA Division III men's basketball tournament
- 2005 NCAA Division I women's basketball tournament
- 2005 NAIA Division I men's basketball tournament
- 2005 NAIA Division II men's basketball tournament
