= Fred Lewis (basketball, born 1921) =

American basketball player (1921–1994)

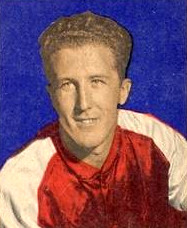
- Lewis in 1948

Personal information
- Born: January 6, 1921 Brooklyn, New York, U.S.
- Died: December 27, 1994 (aged 73) Sacramento, California, U.S.
- Listed height: 6 ft 2 in (1.88 m)
- Listed weight: 195 lb (88 kg)

Career information
- High school: James Madison (Brooklyn, New York)
- College: LIU Brooklyn (1940–1943); Eastern Kentucky (1944–1946)
- Playing career: 1945–1952
- Position: Forward / guard
- Number: 20, 5, 11
- Coaching career: 1947–1985

Career history

Playing
- 1946–1948: Sheboygan Red Skins
- 1947: Birmingham Skyhawks
- 1947–1948: Sheboygan Red Skins
- 1948: Indianapolis Kautskys
- 1948: Indianapolis Jets
- 1948–1949: Baltimore Bullets
- 1949–1950: Philadelphia Warriors
- 1950: Hartford Hurricanes
- 1950–1951: Meriden
- 1951–1952: Washington Capitols

Coaching
- 1947: Birmingham Skyhawks
- 1950–1953: Amityville HS (NY)
- 1953–1956: Hawaii (assistant)
- 1956–1957: Southern Illinois (assistant)
- 1957–1962: Southern Miss
- 1962–1968: Syracuse
- 1984–1985: Sacramento State

Career highlights
- All-NBL First Team (1947); NBL Rookie of the Year (1947); NAIA tournament MVP (1945)
- Stats at NBA.com
- Stats at Basketball Reference

Frederick Bott Lewis Jr. (January 6, 1921 – December 27, 1994) was an American professional basketball player and coach who was the head basketball coach at Syracuse University from 1962 to 1968.

== Playing ==
=== College ===
Lewis played college basketball at LIU Brooklyn. After serving in the United States Marine Corps during World War II, he resumed his career at Eastern Kentucky. He led Eastern Kentucky to an appearance in the 1945 NAIA basketball tournament and was named the tourney's most valuable player. He was the NAIA's fifth leading scorer during the 1945–1946 season and led Eastern Kentucky to another tournament appearance.

=== Professional ===
In 1946, Lewis signed a three-year contract to play for the Sheboygan Red Skins of the National Basketball League. He left the team in 1947 to become the player-coach of the Birmingham team in the Professional Basketball League of America. The league folded on November 13, 1947 and Lewis rejoined the Red Skins on December 4. On February 12, 1948, his contract was sold to the Indianapolis Kautskys.

Indianapolis moved to the Basketball Association of America in 1948. On November 19, 1948, Lewis and Hal Tidrick were traded to the Baltimore Bullets for John Mahnken. Lewis averaged 11.4 points over 53 games for the Bullets that year. During the 1949 offseason, Lewis' right hand was wounded by a .22 caliber bullet in a hunting accident. He played 18 games for the Bullets in 1949, but averaged only 3.5 points. He was released by the club and signed by the Philadelphia Warriors that December. He played 16 games for the Warriors and averaged 3.4 points per game. He finished the season with the Hartford Hurricanes of the American Basketball League.

Lewis played for the Meriden club in the Eastern Basketball League during the 1950–51 season and the Washington Capitols of the American Basketball League during the 1951–52 season.

== Coaching ==
From 1950 to 1953, Lewis coached at Amityville High School, where he compiled a 63–40 record. He then served as an assistant coach at the University of Hawaiʻi at Mānoa (1953–1956) and Southern Illinois (1956–1957). From 1957 to 1962, Lewis coached at University of Southern Mississippi, where he compiled an 89–38 record.

Lewis was the head basketball coach at Syracuse University from 1962 to 1968. He compiled a 91–57 (.615) record during his tenure. He took his team to the National Invitation Tournament two years after the team finished the season with a record of 2–22. One of his teams almost became the first team in NCAA history to average 100 or more points per game. Lewis's 1965–66 team, led by Dave Bing, participated in the NCAA Tournament and won against Davidson College in the first round before Syracuse lost to Duke University.

Lewis left Syracuse in 1968 to become the athletic director at California State University, Sacramento. On December 1, 1969, Lewis and physical education department chairman Merle Rousey were fired after athletic department faculty members protested their policies. He remained at the school as a professor and served as the school's interim men's basketball coach during the 1984–85 season. He died in Sacramento, California on December 27, 1994.

== BAA/NBA career statistics ==
Legend
GP	Games played	FG%	Field-goal percentage
FT%	Free-throw percentage	APG	Assists per game
PPG	Points per game	**Bold**	Career high

=== Regular season ===
Year	Team	GP	FG%	FT%	APG	PPG
1948–49	Indianapolis	8	.270	.708	**2.4**	9.9
1948–49	Baltimore	**53**	**.335**	.771	1.7	**11.4**
1949–50	Baltimore	18	.227	.684	1.0	3.5
1949–50	Philadelphia	16	.284	**.923**	.4	3.4
Career		95	.312	.765	1.4	8.4

=== Playoffs ===
Year	Team	GP	FG%	FT%	APG	PPG
1949	Baltimore	3	.429	.700	1.0	12.3
Career		3	.429	.700	1.0	12.3
