= Julian Wright =

American basketball player (born 1987)

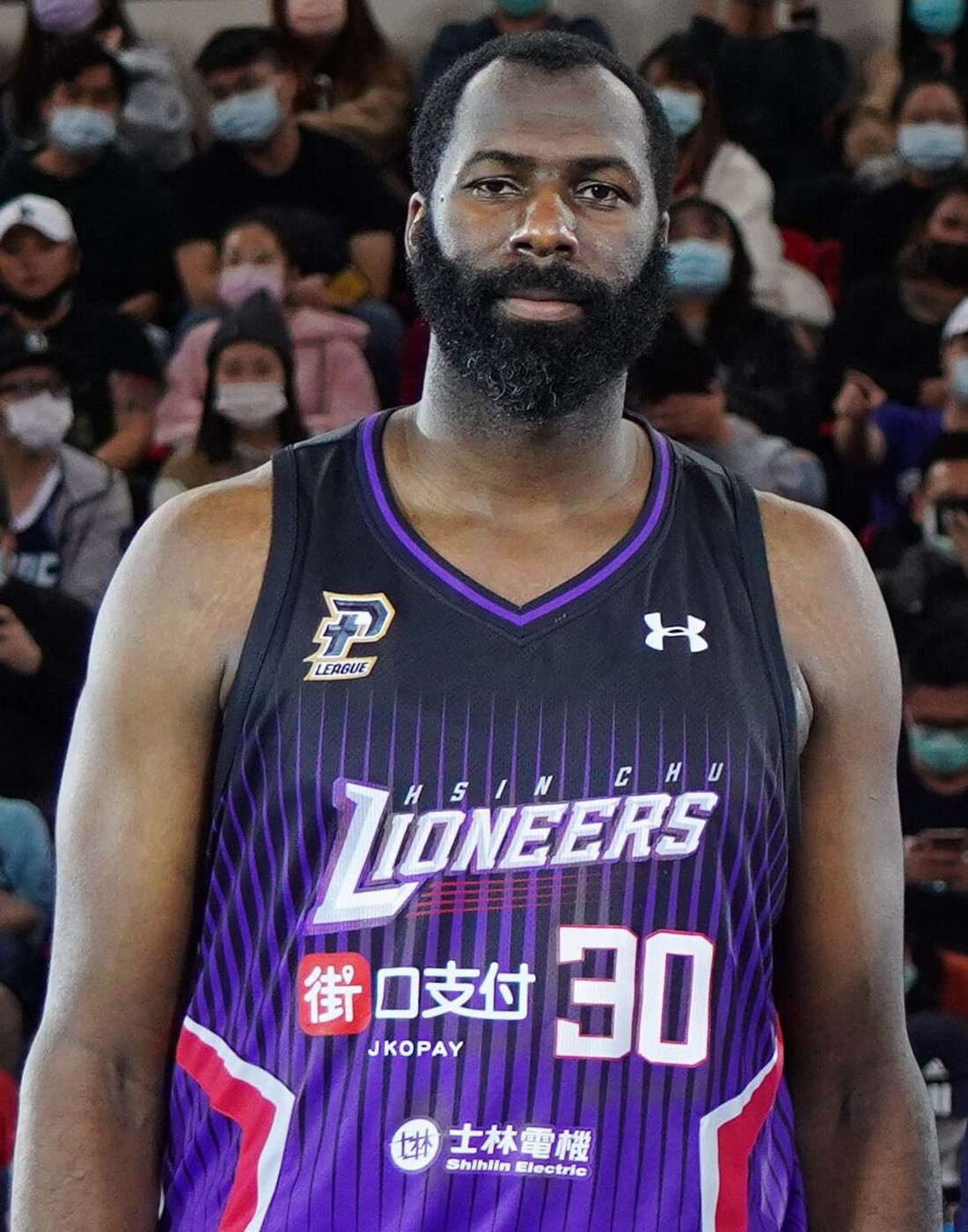
- Wright with the Hsinchu JKO Lioneers in 2021

Personal information
- Born: May 20, 1987 (age 39) Chicago Heights, Illinois, U.S.
- Listed height: 6 ft 8 in (2.03 m)
- Listed weight: 236 lb (107 kg)

Career information
- High school: Homewood-Flossmoor (Flossmoor, Illinois)
- College: Kansas (2005–2007)
- NBA draft: 2007: 1st round, 13th overall pick
- Drafted by: New Orleans Hornets
- Playing career: 2007–2022
- Position: Power forward / center
- Number: 32, 14, 30

Career history
- 2007–2010: New Orleans Hornets
- 2010–2011: Toronto Raptors
- 2012: Austin Toros
- 2012–2013: Maccabi Rishon LeZion
- 2013–2014: Krasnye Krylia
- 2014: Panathinaikos
- 2015: Bnei Herzliya
- 2015: Cangrejeros de Santurce
- 2015–2016: Trento
- 2016–2017: Trabzonspor
- 2017–2018: Reggiana
- 2018–2019: Metropolitans 92
- 2020–2021: Hsinchu JKO Lioneers
- 2021–2022: Taichung Wagor Suns
- 2022: Plateros de Fresnillo

Career highlights
- All-EuroCup Second Team (2016); NBA D-League champion (2012); Turkish League All-Star (2017); Turkish League All-Star MVP (2017); Israeli League Rebounding Leader (2015); Third-team All-American – NABC (2007); First-team All-Big 12 (2007); Big 12 All-Freshman team (2006); Second-team Parade All-American (2005); McDonald's All-American (2005); Illinois Mr. Basketball (2005)
- Stats at NBA.com
- Stats at Basketball Reference

Julian Emil-Jamaal Wright (born May 20, 1987) is an American former professional basketball player. He played college basketball for the Kansas Jayhawks. In 2014–15, he was the top rebounder in the Israel Basketball Premier League.

== High school career ==
Julian Wright played competitive basketball at Homewood-Flossmoor High School in Flossmoor, Illinois. There he led the Vikings to second place in the IHSA state AA tournament his junior year, losing to Peoria Central in the championship game, who were led by future NBA player Shaun Livingston. In 2005, he was selected to the McDonald's All-American team, and he was rated among the top ten basketball players in his class by several recruiting services) due to his talent and versatility. At 6'8" and 225 lb (102 kg), Wright combines good size with excellent athleticism and skills, which allowed him to play numerous positions in high school, including shooting guard, small forward, and power forward.

== College career ==
Wright entered the 2005–06 season for the Kansas Jayhawks as the pre-season freshman of the year in the Big 12 Conference. Though he did not start at the beginning of the season, he quickly played his way into the starting power forward slot. His superior athleticism often allowed him to score baskets simply by virtue of his beating the defense down the court. A highlight of his freshman campaign may have been against the Texas Longhorns in the Big 12 Tournament Championship game when he put an exclamation mark on KU's win with two magnificent breakaway slam dunks in the closing minutes of the game. During his freshman season, Wright averaged 8.5 points per game, but he was praised more for his ability to help his team without scoring. He was named to the All-Big 12 tournament Team and the All-Big 12 Freshman Team along with fellow Kansas freshmen Brandon Rush and Mario Chalmers. During the 2007 tournament, he was again placed on the All-Tournament Team. Wright garnered national attention for a 33-point performance against the Missouri Tigers.

For his play during the 2006–07 season, Wright was named a third-team All-American by the National Association of Basketball Coaches.

Despite statements to the contrary, on Monday, April 9, 2007, Wright announced that he was making himself eligible for the NBA draft. He hired an agent, making him ineligible to return to school prior to the draft.

== Professional career ==
Wright was selected as the 13th overall selection in the 2007 NBA draft by the New Orleans Hornets. In his rookie season in the NBA, Wright averaged 3.9 points per game and 2.1 rebounds per game. On October 26, 2009, the Hornets picked up the option on Wright's contract for the 2010–11 season.

On August 11, 2010, Wright was traded to the Toronto Raptors for Marco Belinelli.

Wright signed with the Austin Toros of the NBA D-League in February 2012.

In October 2012, Wright signed with Maccabi Rishon LeZion of Israel.

In September 2013, he signed with Krasnye Krylia of the VTB United League.

On October 16, 2014, he signed with Panathinaikos of the Greek League. On December 31, 2014, Panathinaikos decided to terminate his contract.

On January 9, 2015, he signed with Bnei Herzliya of the Israeli Premier League for the rest of the season. In 2014–15, he was the top rebounder in the Israel Basketball Premier League.

On June 8, he signed with Cangrejeros de Santurce of Puerto Rico for the rest of the 2015 BSN season.

On August 4, 2015, Wright joined Italian Serie A side Dolomiti Energia Trento for the 2015–16 season.

On July 17, 2016, Wright signed with Turkish club Trabzonspor. On May 1, 2017, he parted ways with Trabzonspor after averaging 13.3 points, 7.7 rebounds and 2.9 assists per game. Three days later, he signed with Italian club Pallacanestro Reggiana for the rest of the 2016–17 Lega Basket Serie A season.

On September 21, 2017, Pallacanestro Reggiana announced the return of Wright.

On August 30, 2018, Wright signed with Levallois Metropolitans in France. However, in February 2019, Wright left Levallois after a dispute with the team. He later posted a video on Linkedin explaining the situation.

On September 29, 2020, Wright signed with the Hsinchu Lioneers of the P.League.

On December 21, 2021, Wright signed with the Taichung Wagor Suns of the T1 League.

One May 25, 2022, Wright was drafted by 3's Company as the fifth overall pick in the 2022 BIG3 draft.

== NBA career statistics ==
Legend
GP	Games played	GS	Games started	MPG	Minutes per game
FG%	Field goal percentage	3P%	3-point field goal percentage	FT%	Free throw percentage
RPG	Rebounds per game	APG	Assists per game	SPG	Steals per game
BPG	Blocks per game	PPG	Points per game	**Bold**	Career high

=== Regular season ===
Year	Team	GP	GS	MPG	FG%	3P%	FT%	RPG	APG	SPG	BPG	PPG
2007–08	New Orleans	57	1	11.2	**.533**	**.417**	**.635**	2.1	.7	.5	.2	3.9
2008–09	New Orleans	54	**19**	14.3	.466	.095	.567	**2.8**	**.8**	**.6**	**.4**	**4.4**
2009–10	New Orleans	**68**	14	12.8	.500	.333	.610	2.1	.6	.4	.3	3.8
2010–11	Toronto	52	6	**14.7**	.512	.200	.512	2.3	1.1	**.8**	**.4**	3.6
Career		231	40	13.2	.499	.262	.584	2.3	.8	.6	.3	3.9

=== Playoffs ===
Year	Team	GP	GS	MPG	FG%	3P%	FT%	RPG	APG	SPG	BPG	PPG
2008	New Orleans	**11**	0	**11.9**	**.455**	**.222**	**.833**	**1.6**	**.5**	**.9**	.1	**4.3**
2009	New Orleans	4	0	8.0	.429	.000	.500	1.5	**.5**	.0	**.3**	2.0
Career		15	0	10.9	.451	.222	.700	1.6	.5	.7	.1	3.7

== Personal life ==
His hometown is Chicago Heights, Illinois and he attended Homewood-Flossmoor High School class of 2005.

Wright is a bowling hobbyist, and was described by the Kansas City Star as having bowled at the University of Kansas's Jay Bowl "at least one night a week". He owns both a bowling ball and bowling shoes, the latter of which are KU's blue and crimson colors.

== Awards and highlights ==
High school

- McDonald's All-American (2005)
- Illinois Mr. Basketball (2005)

NBA

- Led 2008 NBA Playoffs in Steal Pct.

Awards and achievements
Preceded by Shaun Livingston	Illinois Mr. Basketball Award Winner; 2005	Succeeded by Jon Scheyer
