= 2018 NAIA Division I men's basketball tournament =

College basketball tournament

- Teams: 32
- Finals site: Municipal Auditorium, Kansas City, Missouri
- Champions: Graceland Yellowjackets (1 title, 1 title game, 1 Fab Four)
- Runner-up: Alexandria State Generals
- Semifinalists: William Penn Statesmen; Shreveport State Pilots
- Coach of the year: Craig Doty (Graceland (Iowa))
- Charles Stevenson Hustle Award: Dom Robinson (Montana Western)
- Chuck Taylor MVP: LT Davis (Graceland)
- Attendance: Championship game: 6,377
- Top scorer: Jordin Williams (LSU Alexandria) (31 points)

The 2018 NAIA Division I men's basketball tournament was held in March at Municipal Auditorium in Kansas City, Missouri. The 81st annual NAIA basketball tournament features 32 teams playing in a single-elimination format. The opening game round started on March 14, and the National Championship Game was played on March 20. As of 2018, 576 schools have participated in the NAIA Men's Tournament. 48 states, all but Alaska and Wyoming have been represented.

The Tournament Final saw the Graceland Yellowjackets beat the Generals of LSU–Alexandria 83 to 80 in overtime, with the winning 3-point basket made from the right sideline as the game clock expired. It was the first overtime final since 2016, and the ninth overtime final in tournament history. This was Graceland University’s first appearance in the national tournament, and first championship. LSU Alexandria also marked its first appearance in the tournament. The most recent previous first appearance champion was Dalton State (Ga.) in 2015. Graceland became the first team with double-digit losses to win the title since John Brown (Ark.) in 2005. Graceland was the first team from the Heart of America Athletic Conference to compete in the championship final.

Including the 2018 championship, the last 11 national champions have been different, with Texas Wesleyan taking the 2017 trophy. Six of those champions in the last nine years – Mid-America Christian, Dalton State (Ga.), Vanguard (Calif.), Pikeville (Ky.), Rocky Mountain (Mont.) and Graceland – were winners for the first time in school history.

== Awards and honors ==
- Player of the Year: Ryan Imhoff Carroll (Mont.)
- Most consecutive tournament appearances: 27th, Georgetown (KY)
- Most tournament appearances: 37th, Georgetown (KY)
- Dr. James Naismith: Emil S. Liston
- Team Sportsmanship Award: Montana State-Northern
- Chuck Walden Memorial Award: Scott Thompson and Julia Robinson, Tricension
- NABC-NAIA Coach of the Year: Kelvin Starr, The Master's (Calif.)

== 2018 NAIA bracket ==
First round March 14–15	Second round March 16
1	The Master's (CA)	104
8	Peru State (NE)	106*
8	Peru State (NE)	77
4	LSU Alexandria (LA)	98
4	LSU Alexandria (LA)	77
5	Lewis-Clark State (ID)	71
NAISMITH BRACKET; March 14
3	Georgetown (KY)	79
6	Central Baptist (AR)	74
3	Georgetown (KY)	91
2	Oklahoma City	83
2	Oklahoma City	62
7	Xavier (LA)	50
1	William Penn (IA)	68
8	Science & Arts (OK)	63
1	William Penn (IA)	68*
4	Dalton State (GA)	64
4	Dalton State (GA)	62
5	Cumberlands (KY)	60
CRAMER BRACKET; March 15
3	Hope International (CA)	60
6	Our Lady of the Lake (TX)	68
6	Our Lady of the Lake (TX)	64*
2	Carroll (MT)	62
2	Carroll (MT)	61
7	Lindsey Wilson (KY)	53
1	Pikeville (KY)	61
8	Langston (OK)	63
8	Langston (OK)	59
5	Graceland (IA)	67
4	Texas Wesleyan	61
5	Graceland (IA)	70
DUER BRACKET; March 15
3	Montana Western	105
6	SAGU (TX)	96
3	Montana Western	75
7	Campbellsville (KY)	72
2	Columbia (MO)	66
7	Campbellsville (KY)	75
1	LSU Shreveport (LA)	72
8	Harris-Stowe State (MO)	63
1	LSU Shreveport (LA)	70
5	Dillard (LA)	67
4	Westmont (CA)	71
5	Dillard (LA)	74
LISTON BRACKET; March 14
3	William Carey (MS)	67
6	Life (GA)	68
6	Life (GA)	43
7	Wayland Baptist (TX)	65
2	Central Methodist	44
7	Wayland Baptist (TX)	68

Quarterfinals; March 17
4	LSU Alexandria (LA)	87
3	Georgetown (KY)	66
1	William Penn (IA)	89
6	Our Lady of the Lake (TX)	76
5	Graceland (IA)	86
3	Montana Western	76
1	LSU Shreveport (LA)	71
7	Wayland Baptist (TX)	66

National Semifinals; March 19
4	LSU Alexandria (LA)	84
1	William Penn (IA)	75
5	Graceland (IA)	87
1	LSU Shreveport (LA)	80

National Championship; March 20
4	LSU Alexandria (LA)	80
5	Graceland (IA)	83*

- denotes overtime.

== See also ==
- 2018 NAIA Division I women's basketball tournament
- 2018 NCAA Division I men's basketball tournament
- 2018 NCAA Division II men's basketball tournament
- 2018 NCAA Division III men's basketball tournament
- 2018 NAIA Division II men's basketball tournament
