= 2001 NAIA Division I women's basketball tournament =

- Teams: 32
- Finals site: Oman Arena, Jackson, Tennessee
- Champions: Oklahoma City Stars (4th title, 4th title game, 4th Fab Four)
- Runner-up: Auburn Montgomery Warhawks (1st title game, 2nd Fab Four)
- Semifinalists: Lewis–Clark State Warriors (1st Fab Four); Southern Nazarene Crimson Storm (10th Fab Four)
- Coach of the year: Janell Jones (Oklahoma City)
- Player of the year: Rachel Stark (Oklahoma Baptist)
- Charles Stevenson Hustle Award: April Pearson (Union (TN))
- Chuck Taylor MVP: Taiwo Rafiu (Oklahoma City)
- Top scorer: Taiwo Rafiu (Oklahoma City) (88 points)

The 2001 NAIA Division I women's basketball tournament was the tournament held by the NAIA to determine the national champion of women's college basketball among its Division I members in the United States and Canada for the 2000–01 basketball season.

Two-time defending champions Oklahoma City defeated Auburn Montgomery in the championship game, 69–52, to claim the Stars' fourth NAIA national title. This would go on to be the third of four consecutive titles for Oklahoma City.

The tournament was played at the Oman Arena in Jackson, Tennessee.

== Qualification ==
The tournament field remained fixed at thirty-two teams, with the top sixteen teams receiving seeds.

The tournament continued to utilize a simple single-elimination format.

== Bracket ==
First round
1 | Oklahoma City | 81
Westmont | 38
Western Montana | 63
16 | North Georgia | 56
9 | Freed–Hardeman | 83
Voorhees | 58
Wayland Baptist | 67
8 | Georgetown (KY) | 81
5 | Lewis–Clark State | 84
Trevecca Nazarene | 72
Brewton–Parker | 64
12 | Cumberlands (KY) | 70
13 | Oklahoma Christian | 68
Houston Baptist | 70*
Dillard | 67
4 | The Master's | 55
3 | Auburn Montgomery | 59
Indiana–South Bend | 43
Central State (OH) | 66
14 | Azusa Pacific | 61
11 | Campbellsville | 69
Oklahoma Baptist | 70
Hannibal–LaGrange | 62
6 | Union (TN) | 74
7 | Southern Nazarene | 81
Jarvis Christian | 57
Brescia | 73
10 | Montana State Northern | 85
15 | Xavier Louisiana | 63
Lambuth | 90
Georgia Southwestern | 60
2 | Life | 67

Second round
1 | Oklahoma City | 85
Western Montana | 51
9 | Freed–Hardeman | 56
8 | Georgetown (KY) | 61
5 | Lewis–Clark State | 71
4 | Cumberlands (KY) | 63
Houston Baptist | 72
Dillard | 66
3 | Auburn Montgomery | 72
Central State (OH) | 63
Oklahoma Baptist | 56
6 | Union (TN) | 66
7 | Southern Nazarene | 71
10 | Montana State Northern | 52
Lambuth | 62
2 | Life | 72

Elite Eight
1 | Oklahoma City | 83
8 | Georgetown (KY) | 69
5 | Lewis–Clark State | 84
Houston Baptist | 82
3 | Auburn Montgomery | 55
6 | Union (TN) | 52
7 | Southern Nazarene | 65
2 | Life | 60

Final Four
1 | Oklahoma City | 72
5 | Lewis–Clark State | 55
3 | Auburn Montgomery | 53
7 | Southern Nazarene | 49

National championship
1 | Oklahoma City | 69
3 | Auburn Montgomery | 52

== See also ==
- 2001 NAIA Division I men's basketball tournament
- 2001 NCAA Division I women's basketball tournament
- 2001 NCAA Division II women's basketball tournament
- 2001 NCAA Division III women's basketball tournament
- 2001 NAIA Division II women's basketball tournament
