= Darrel Brown (basketball) =

American basketball player

Personal information
- Born: March 14, 1923 Eureka, California
- Died: October 7, 1990 (aged 67)
- Listed height: 6 ft 2 in (1.88 m)
- Listed weight: 175 lb (79 kg)

Career information
- College: Humboldt State (1941–1943, 1946–1947); Pacific (1943–1944)
- BAA draft: 1948: – round, –
- Drafted by: Baltimore Bullets
- Playing career: 1948–1949
- Position: Forward
- Number: 4

Career history
- 1948–1949: Baltimore Bullets
- Stats at NBA.com
- Stats at Basketball Reference

Darrel Keith Brown (March 14, 1923 – October 7, 1990) was an American professional basketball player.

== Career ==
Brown played collegiately for the College of the Pacific and Humboldt State University. He was selected by the Baltimore Bullets in the 1948 BAA draft, and played three games for the Bullets during the 1948–49 BAA season.

== BAA career statistics ==
Legend
GP	Games played
FG%	Field-goal percentage
FT%	Free-throw percentage
APG	Assists per game
PPG	Points per game

=== Regular season ===
Year	Team	GP	FG%	FT%	APG	PPG
1948–49	Baltimore	3	.333	.000	.0	1.3
Career		3	.333	.000	.0	1.3
