= Dalton State College =

Public college in Dalton, Georgia, U.S.

Coordinates: 34.775°N 85.003°W

- Former names: Dalton Junior College (1963–1987); Dalton College (1987–1998)
- Type: Public college
- Established: 1963; 63 years ago
- Parent institution: University System of Georgia
- Endowment: $25.3 million
- President: John Fuchko, III
- Faculty: 160 (full-time), 72 (part-time)
- Students: 5,047(2012)
- Undergraduates: 5,987 (2010)
- Location: Dalton, Georgia, United States
- Campus: Small city, 146 acres (0.59 km^{2})
- Colors: Blue & Silver
- Nickname: Roadrunners
- Sporting affiliations: NAIA – SSAC
- Website: daltonstate.edu

Dalton State College (DSC or Dalton State) is a public college in Dalton, Georgia, United States. It is part of the University System of Georgia. Founded in 1963 as a junior college, the college became a four-year institution in 1998. Dalton State is accredited by the Southern Association of Colleges and Schools (SACS).

== History ==
The college was founded as Dalton Junior College in July 1963 and opened in September 1967. It offered programs designed to provide the first two years of college work for students preparing to transfer to four-year degree-granting institutions. The addition of a technical division in 1976 also enabled the school to serve students wishing to develop work skills at the certificate or associate degree level. In 1987, the Board of Regents of the University System of Georgia removed the word "Junior" from the college's name and it became Dalton College.

In 1998, the University System of Georgia upgraded Dalton College to four-year status under a new name, Dalton State College, and authorized it to offer bachelor's degrees. The first bachelor's programs began that year, in business and technology.

In 2009, Dalton State opened an extended campus in Ellijay called the Dalton State Gilmer County Center. More than 200 students enrolled for the spring semester. Dalton State also opened its first on-campus residential housing, Dalton State at Wood Valley.

Today, Dalton State College offers baccalaureate degrees in accounting, biology, chemistry, communication, criminal justice, early childhood education, English, history, interdisciplinary studies, management, management information systems, marketing systems, mathematics, operations management, psychology, social work, and technology management. The college also offers 22 associate degree and several certificate programs.

== Academics ==
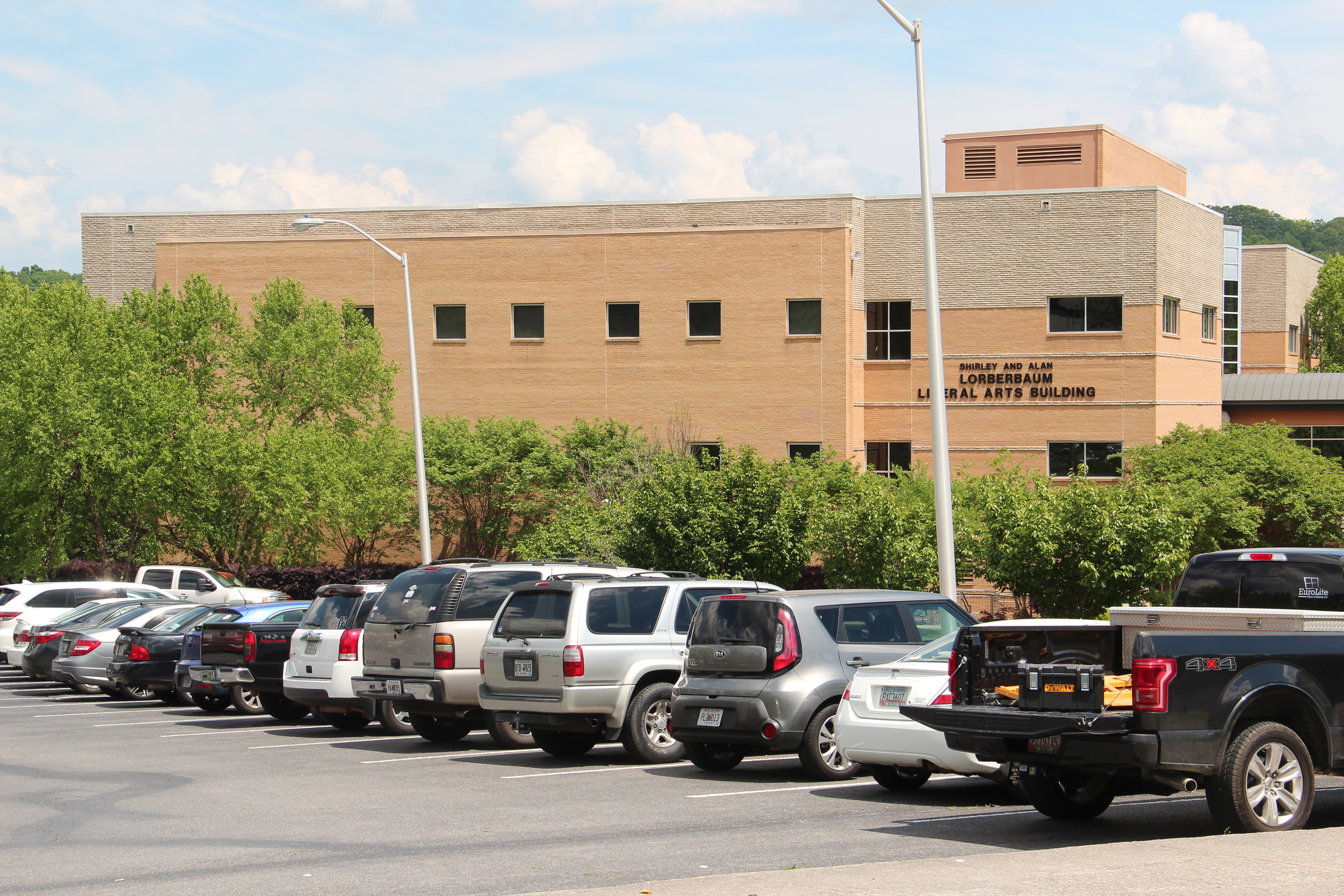
Lorberbaum Liberal Arts Building

Dalton State College is accredited by the Commission on Colleges of the Southern Association of Colleges and Schools. The Early Childhood Education program is accredited by the National Council for Accreditation of Teacher Education (NCATE). The Social Work program is accredited by the Council on Social Work Education (CSWE). The C. Lamar and Ann Wright School of Business programs received initial accreditation by Association to Advance Collegiate Schools of Business (AACSB) in January 2010.

== Campus ==
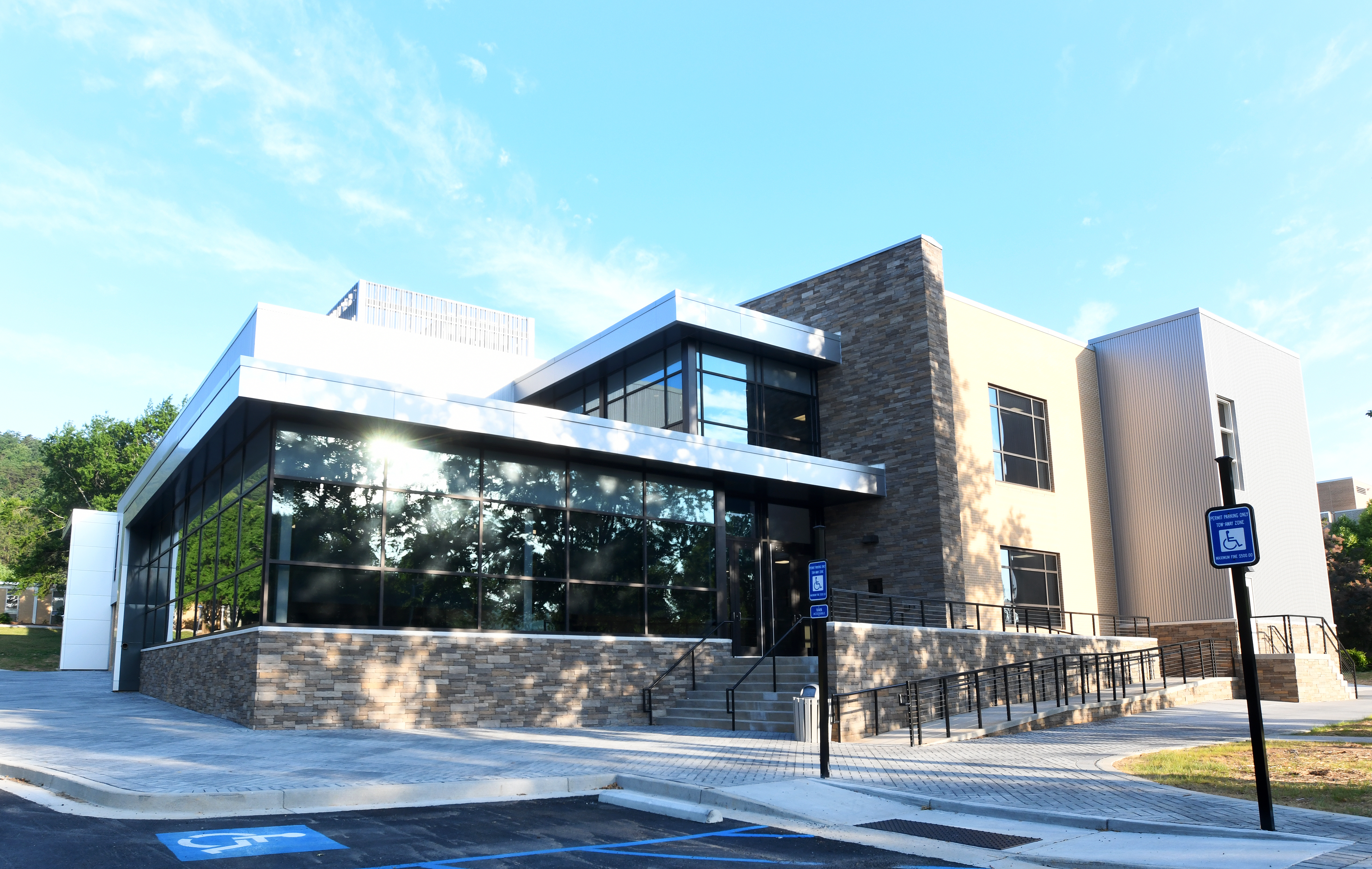
Dalton State College's Wright School of Business

The Dalton State College main campus consists of 146 acres (0.59 km^{2}) on I-75 in Whitfield County, Georgia, 30 miles south of Chattanooga and 80 miles north of Atlanta. An additional campus exists in Ellijay, Georgia, southeast of the main campus.

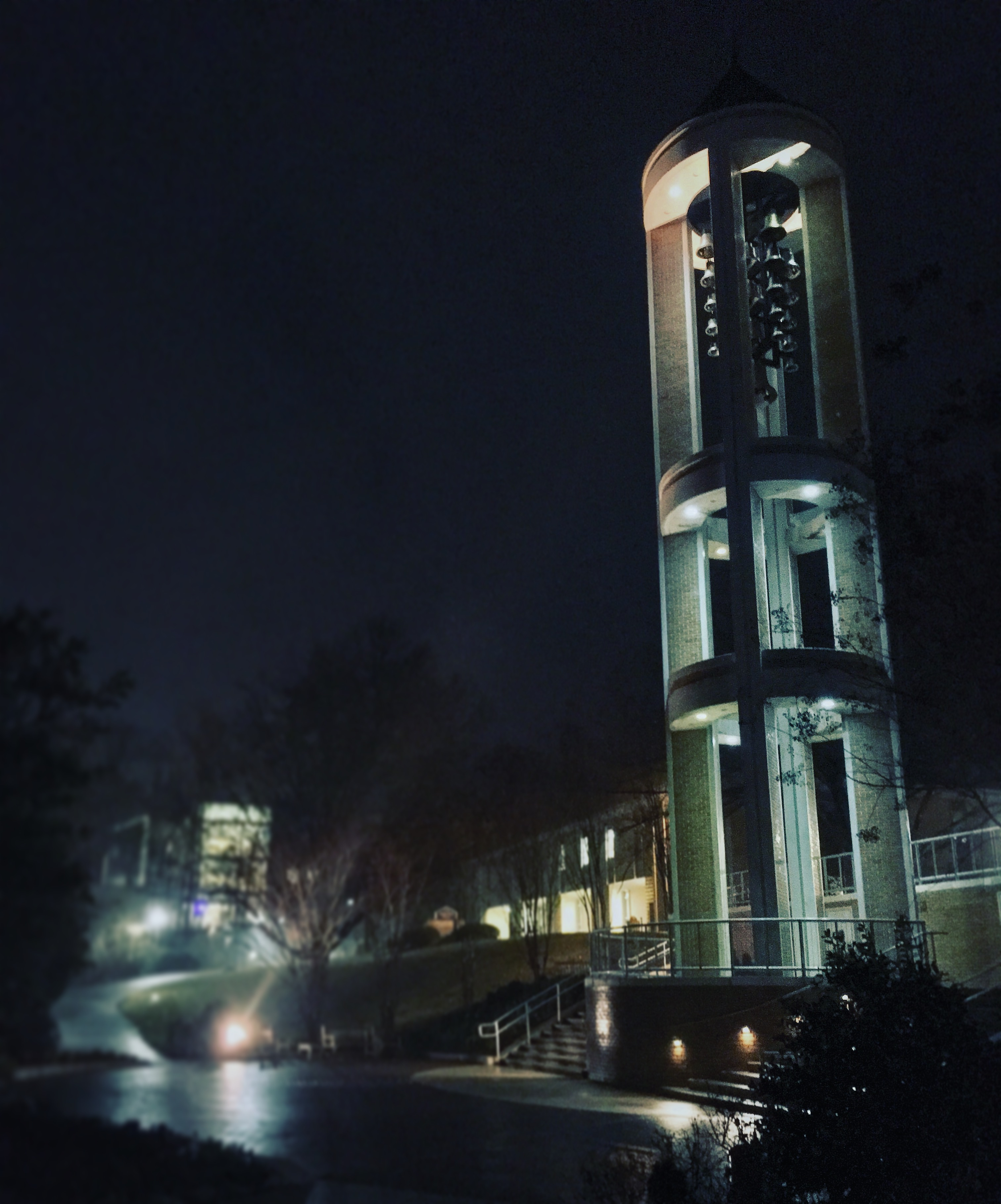
Dalton State Bell Tower viewed from the north at night

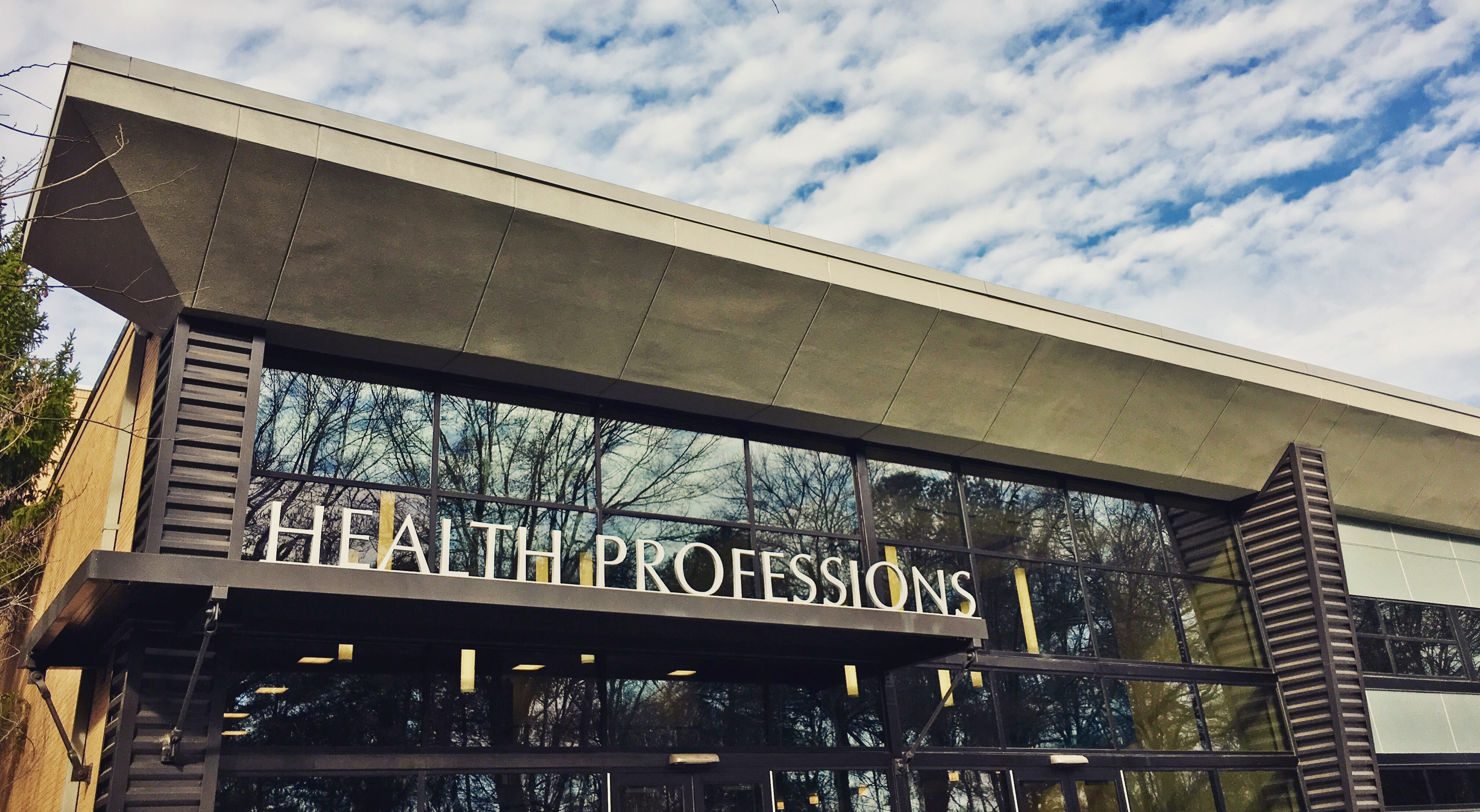
Health Professions Building

== Demographics ==
The almost 5,000 traditional and non-traditional students are from a 10-county service area of Northwest Georgia in addition to 38 foreign countries. The average student age is 24; females make up 62 percent of the student population. On-campus housing has been offered since fall 2009.

== Athletics ==
The Dalton State athletics teams are called the Roadrunners. The college is a member of the National Association of Intercollegiate Athletics (NAIA), primarily competing in the Southern States Athletic Conference (SSAC; formerly known as Georgia–Alabama–Carolina Conference (GACC) until after the 2003–04 school year) since the 2014–15 academic year. The Roadrunners previously competed as an NAIA Independent within the Association of Independent Institutions (AII) from 2012–13 (when the school began its athletics program and joined the NAIA) to 2013–14.

Dalton State competes in seven intercollegiate varsity sports: Men's sports include basketball, golf and soccer; while women's sports include cross country, golf, soccer and track & field.

=== Nickname ===
The Dalton State mascot is the roadrunner. This mascot was chosen by the first men's basketball head coach, Melvin Ottinger in 1967. Ottinger was actually inspired by the successful Warner Bros. cartoon character. Originally listed as "Road Runner", the animation studio sent a letter ordering them to stop using the term due to copyright issues. This was fixed by combining the two words into one.

=== History ===
Dalton State College began an athletics program in 2014. The men's basketball team won the NAIA National Championship in 2015 on their second season within the organization.

The athletics program was reorganized in 2017 in order to bring the program into compliance with Title IX requirements and to reduce costs. As part of the reorganization, volleyball, men's cross country, and men's and women's tennis were dropped from the program and women's track and field was added.

== Student life ==
Undergraduate demographics as of Fall 2023
Race and ethnicity	Total
White	51%
Hispanic	37%
Black	4%
Asian	2%
Two or more races	2%
Unknown	2%
International student	1%
Economic diversity
Low-income (Note: The percentage of students who received an income-based federal Pell grant intended for low-income students.)	53%
Affluent (Note: The percentage of students who are a part of the American middle class at the bare minimum.)	47%

The Campus Activities Board (CAB) is a student-run organization that strives to enhance the Dalton State College student experience through quality entertainment, creative programming and community involvement. Its stated goal is to strengthen the missions of both the Office of Student Life and Dalton State College by providing a variety of social, recreational, cultural and educational programs.

Through the expertise of an appointed student executive board, CAB works to ensure leadership development, networking with the college community, building campus traditions and school spirit.

Alpha Kappa Lambda became the first men's fraternity on campus when it received its charter on 7 April 2014. Delta Chi began colonizing on campus in fall 2015, becoming the second IFC fraternity on campus. Alpha Omicron Pi, colonized in spring 2014, is the first National Panhellenic Conference sorority on campus. Alpha Sigma Tau was the second sorority on campus, chartered in spring 2016.

== Student housing ==
In fall 2016, Dalton State opened new dormitories. Mashburn Hall holds 363 beds and replaced the Wood Valley complex, on-campus apartments that previously housed 160 students.
