= 2015 NAIA Division I women's basketball tournament =

- Teams: 32
- Finals site: Independence Events Center, Independence, Missouri
- Champions: Oklahoma City Stars (8th title, 11th title game, 13th Fab Four)
- Runner-up: Campbellsville Tigers (1st title game, 1st Fab Four)
- Semifinalists: Freed–Hardeman Lions (6th Fab Four); Westmont Warriors (2nd Fab Four)
- Coach of the year: Latricia Trammell (Oklahoma City)
- Player of the year: Hayley Newby (Freed–Hardeman)
- Charles Stevenson Hustle Award: Chelsea Craig (Campbellsville)
- Chuck Taylor MVP: Yvonte Neal (Oklahoma City)
- Top scorer: Tayla Foster (Bethel (TN)) (85 points)

The 2015 NAIA Division I women's basketball tournament was the tournament held by the NAIA to determine the national champion of women's college basketball among its Division I members in the United States and Canada for the 2014–15 basketball season.

Defending champions Oklahoma City defeated Campbellsville in the championship game, 80–63, to claim the Stars' eighth NAIA national title.

The tournament was played at the Independence Events Center in Independence, Missouri.

== Qualification ==
The tournament field remained fixed at thirty-two teams, which were sorted into four quadrants of eight teams each. Within each quadrant, teams were seeded sequentially from one to eight based on record and season performance.

The tournament continued to utilize a simple single-elimination format.

== Bracket ==
First round
1	Oklahoma City	63
8	Lewis–Clark State	61
5	Shawnee State	69
4	The Master's	57
3	Langston	80
6	Pikeville	71
7	Great Falls	73
2	Loyola New Orleans	54
2	Oklahoma Baptist	52
7	Baker (KS)	47
6	Martin Methodist	67
3	Our Lady of the Lake	83
4	Westmont	74
5	Lyon (AR)	63
8	Cumberland (TN)	38
1	Westminster (UT)	53
1	Freed–Hardeman	64
8	Cal State San Marcos	54
5	Wiley	61
4	Benedictine (KS)	63
3	Montana State Northern	60
6	Lindsey Wilson	42
7	Southern New Orleans	84
2	Vanguard	56
2	Bethel (TN)	62
7	William Woods	61
6	Carroll (MT)	48
3	Concordia Irvine	59
4	MidAmerica Nazarene	72
5	Wayland Baptist	69
8	LSU Shreveport	46
1	Campbellsville	55

Second round
1	Oklahoma City	87
5	Shawnee State	68
3	Langston	69
7	Great Falls	72
2	Oklahoma Baptist	77
3	Our Lady of the Lake	75
4	Westmont	68
1	Westminster (UT)	59
1	Freed–Hardeman	69
4	Benedictine (KS)	62
3	Montana State Northern	73
2	Southern New Orleans	54
2	Bethel (TN)	86*
3	Concordia Irvine	85
4	MidAmerica Nazarene	45
1	Campbellsville	52

Quarterfinals
1	Oklahoma City	88
7	Great Falls	52
2	Oklahoma Baptist	81
4	Westmont	83***
1	Freed–Hardeman	63
3	Montana State Northern	50
2	Bethel (TN)	64
1	Campbellsville	73

Semifinals
1	Oklahoma City	77
4	Westmont	57
1	Freed–Hardeman	52
1	Campbellsville	56

National championship
1	Oklahoma City	80
1	Campbellsville	63

== See also ==
- 2015 NAIA Division I men's basketball tournament
- 2015 NCAA Division I women's basketball tournament
- 2015 NCAA Division II women's basketball tournament
- 2015 NCAA Division III women's basketball tournament
- 2015 NAIA Division II women's basketball tournament
