= 1948–49 Baltimore Bullets season =

- Head coach: Buddy Jeannette
- Arena: Baltimore Coliseum

Results
- Record: 29–31 (.483)
- Place: Division: 3rd (Eastern)
- Playoff finish: East Division Semifinals (eliminated 1–2)
- Stats at Basketball Reference

Local media
- Television: WMAR-TV
- Radio: WITH

The 1948–49 BAA season was the Bullets' 2nd season in the NBA/BAA and their fifth overall season including the time they spent in the American Basketball League. Entering this season, the Bullets sought to officially acquire their third professional league championship in four seasons when combining their results from both the ABL and the BAA (though they would have personally considered this season their shot at four straight professional league championships due to them personally considering themselves the 1947 ABL champions for their overwhelming record as protest for that league's initial decision to constantly delay their playoff series of matches so many times beforehand). Despite entering this season as defending champions, the Bullets would end their second season in the BAA with a losing record of 29–31, though it was still good enough for a third place spot in the Eastern Division semifinal round. When entering the final playoffs ever holding the BAA's name, the Bullets ended up getting eliminated by the New York Knickerbockers 2–1 in the first round of what later ended up becoming the Bullets' second-to-last playoff appearance in league history, as well as their first of many seasons where they would end up having losing seasons going forward with their existence after previously being considered champions of both the ABL and BAA before the BAA would merge with the NBL to become the modern-day NBA.

== Draft picks ==
Round	Pick	Player	Position	Nationality	College
1	6	Walt Budko	F/C	United States	Columbia
–	–	Jim Black	–	United States	Occidental
–	–	Darrell Brown	F	United States	Humboldt State
–	–	Robert Carroll	–	United States	West Virginia
–	–	Jake Carter	F/C	United States	East Texas State
–	–	Marvin English	–	United States	Newberry
–	–	Gene Fellmoth	–	United States	Wittenberg
–	–	J.W. Fullerton	–	United States	Arkansas State
–	–	Marshall Gemberling	–	United States	Lebanon Valley
–	–	Vince Hansen	–	United States	Washington State
–	–	Joe Holland	F	United States	Kentucky
–	–	Wayne Jones	–	United States	American International
–	–	Dan Kraus	G	United States	Georgetown
–	–	Herb Krautblatt	G	United States	Rider
–	–	Paul Marcincin	–	United States	Moravian

== Roster ==
Baltimore Bullets roster
Players

Pos.	No.	Player	Height	Weight	DOB	From
F	4	Darrell Brown	6 ft 2 in (1.88 m)	175 lb (79 kg)	1923-03-14	Cal Poly Humboldt
F/C	12	Walt Budko	6 ft 5 in (1.96 m)	220 lb (100 kg)	1925-07-30	Columbia
G/F	8	Johnny Ezersky	6 ft 3 in (1.91 m)	175 lb (79 kg)		Rhode Island
F		Doug Holcomb	6 ft 4 in (1.93 m)	200 lb (91 kg)	1925-02-09	Wisconsin
G	6	Buddy Jeannette	5 ft 11 in (1.80 m)	175 lb (79 kg)	1917-09-15	Washington & Jefferson
G	15	Dan Kraus	6 ft 0 in (1.83 m)	195 lb (88 kg)	1923-02-13	Georgetown
G	9	Herb Krautblatt	6 ft 1 in (1.85 m)	190 lb (86 kg)	1926-11-19	Rider
G/F	5	Fred Lewis	6 ft 2 in (1.88 m)	195 lb (88 kg)	1921-01-06	Eastern Kentucky
C	7	John Mahnken	6 ft 8 in (2.03 m)	220 lb (100 kg)	1922-06-16	Georgetown
F/C		Don Martin	6 ft 7 in (2.01 m)	210 lb (95 kg)	1920-02-07	Central Missouri
F/C	14	Leo Mogus	6 ft 4 in (1.93 m)	190 lb (86 kg)	1921-04-13	Youngstown State
F/C	10	Jake Pelkington	6 ft 6 in (1.98 m)	220 lb (100 kg)	1916-01-03	Manhattan
G/F	8	Howie Rader	6 ft 1 in (1.85 m)	190 lb (86 kg)	1921-03-29	Long Island
G/F	14	Ray Ramsey	6 ft 2 in (1.88 m)	165 lb (75 kg)	1921-07-18	Bradley
G/F	3	Chick Reiser	5 ft 11 in (1.80 m)	165 lb (75 kg)	1914-12-17	NYU
F/C	11	Connie Simmons	6 ft 8 in (2.03 m)	222 lb (101 kg)	1925-03-15	Flushing HS (NY)
G/F	5	Stan Stutz	5 ft 10 in (1.78 m)	170 lb (77 kg)	1920-04-14	Rhode Island
G	9	Sid Tanenbaum	6 ft 0 in (1.83 m)	160 lb (73 kg)	1925-10-08	NYU
G/F	4	Hal Tidrick	6 ft 1 in (1.85 m)	190 lb (86 kg)	1915-08-04	Washington & Jefferson
F/C	15	Jack Toomay	6 ft 6 in (1.98 m)	215 lb (98 kg)	1922-08-09	Pacific
F	9	Irv Torgoff	6 ft 2 in (1.88 m)	192 lb (87 kg)	1917-03-06	Long Island

Coaches
Head coach

Buddy Jeannette

Legend
- (DP) Unsigned draft pick
- (FA) Free agent
- (S) Suspended
- Injured

Roster

== Regular season ==
=== Season standings ===
#	Eastern Division				
#	Team	W	L	PCT	GB
1	x-Washington Capitols	38	22	.633	–
2	x-New York Knicks	32	28	.533	6
3	x-Baltimore Bullets	29	31	.483	9
4	x-Philadelphia Warriors	28	32	.467	10
5	Boston Celtics	25	35	.417	13
6	Providence Steamrollers	12	48	.200	26

=== Game log ===
#	Date	Opponent	Score	High points	Record
1	November 4	Minneapolis	72–84	Connie Simmons (19)	0–1
2	November 6	@ Chicago	69–82	Mahnken, Stutz (17)	0–2
3	November 7	@ Fort Wayne	78–77	Chick Reiser (20)	1–2
4	November 9	@ Indianapolis	65–64	Buddy Jeannette (22)	2–2
5	November 11	Washington	68–70	Walt Budko (15)	2–3
6	November 13	@ New York	87–91	Walt Budko (22)	2–4
7	November 18	New York	55–67	Connie Simmons (15)	2–5
8	November 19	vs St. Louis	72–82	Connie Simmons (20)	2–6
9	November 20	@ St. Louis	85–64	Hal Tidrick (14)	3–6
10	November 21	@ Minneapolis	81–94	Lewis, Simmons (17)	3–7
11	November 23	@ Rochester	90–108	Connie Simmons (28)	3–8
12	November 25	Fort Wayne	69–64	Fred Lewis (16)	4–8
13	November 27	@ Providence	91–71	Connie Simmons (21)	5–8
14	December 2	Indianapolis	90–78	Reiser, Simmons (15)	6–8
15	December 4	@ Washington	82–83	Connie Simmons (22)	6–9
16	December 8	@ Philadelphia	83–78	Connie Simmons (19)	7–9
17	December 9	Philadelphia	92–91	Hal Tidrick (17)	8–9
18	December 11	@ New York	71–72	Jake Pelkington (21)	8–10
19	December 13	vs Chicago	70–75	Walt Budko (20)	8–11
20	December 14	vs Indianapolis	88–75	Hal Tidrick (24)	9–11
21	December 16	St. Louis	82–85 (OT)	Simmons, Tidrick (17)	9–12
22	December 17	@ Boston	74–63	Lewis, Reiser (16)	10–12
23	December 23	Chicago	96–89	Fred Lewis (20)	11–12
24	December 25	@ Providence	88–83	Connie Simmons (23)	12–12
25	December 29	Providence	88–98	Connie Simmons (25)	12–13
26	December 30	Rochester	100–89	Connie Simmons (23)	13–13
27	January 1	Boston	72–67	Fred Lewis (16)	14–13
28	January 4	@ Boston	69–75	Fred Lewis (17)	14–14
29	January 5	@ Washington	88–68	Connie Simmons (18)	15–14
30	January 6	Philadelphia	93–88	Connie Simmons (25)	16–14
31	January 8	@ New York	83–81	Chick Reiser (23)	17–14
32	January 12	Washington	106–92	Stanley Stutz (27)	18–14
33	January 13	Rochester	85–102	Jake Pelkington (27)	18–15
34	January 15	@ Philadelphia	87–94	Budko, Pelkington (16)	18–16
35	January 20	New York	82–68	Connie Simmons (21)	19–16
36	January 22	@ Providence	86–89	Connie Simmons (15)	19–17
37	January 26	Washington	96–86	Connie Simmons (28)	20–17
38	January 27	Providence	89–95	Fred Lewis (20)	20–18
39	January 29	@ Rochester	86–90	Jake Pelkington (30)	20–19
40	January 30	@ Fort Wayne	93–78	Connie Simmons (23)	21–19
41	February 2	@ Chicago	67–77	Chick Reiser (19)	21–20
42	February 3	Boston	84–76	Pelkington, Tidrick (17)	22–20
43	February 5	Indianapolis	87–75	Walt Budko (18)	23–20
44	February 7	@ Boston	83–95	Jake Pelkington (24)	23–21
45	February 10	Rochester	76–90	Chick Reiser (25)	23–22
46	February 12	@ St. Louis	73–74	Hal Tidrick (15)	23–23
47	February 13	@ Minneapolis	74–91	Connie Simmons (14)	23–24
48	February 15	@ Indianapolis	82–69	Sid Tanenbaum (18)	24–24
49	February 16	@ Fort Wayne	68–84	Chick Reiser (15)	24–25
50	February 17	Providence	100–102	Stanley Stutz (24)	24–26
51	February 19	@ Washington	88–92	Jake Pelkington (17)	24–27
52	February 24	Chicago	68–87	Jake Pelkington (14)	24–28
53	February 26	Minneapolis	114–115 (2OT)	Jake Pelkington (33)	24–29
54	March 3	St. Louis	94–66	Hal Tidrick (21)	25–29
55	March 5	Philadelphia	99–85	Stanley Stutz (21)	26–29
56	March 10	New York	94–99	Jake Pelkington (18)	26–30
57	March 12	Boston	89–77	Sid Tanenbaum (21)	27–30
58	March 15	@ Philadelphia	76–84	Jake Pelkington (13)	27–31
59	March 17	Minneapolis	101–67	Chick Reiser (23)	28–31
60	March 19	Fort Wayne	99–79	Connie Simmons (21)	29–31

== BAA Playoffs ==
=== BAA East Division Semifinals ===
(2) New York Knicks vs. (3) Baltimore Bullets: Knicks win series 2-1

- Game 1 @ New York: Baltimore 82, New York 81
- Game 2 @ Baltimore: New York 84, Baltimore 74
- Game 3 @ New York: New York 103, Baltimore 99 (OT)

Last Playoff Meeting: 1948 BAA Quarterfinals (Baltimore won 2–1)

== Player statistics ==
Legend
GP	Games played	GS	Games started	MPG	Minutes per game
FG%	Field-goal percentage	3P%	3-point field-goal percentage	FT%	Free-throw percentage
RPG	Rebounds per game	APG	Assists per game	SPG	Steals per game
BPG	Blocks per game	PPG	Points per game
