= 2005 NAIA Division II men's basketball tournament =

- Teams: 32
- Finals site: Keeter Gymnasium; Point Lookout, Missouri
- Champions: Walsh Cavaliers (1st title, 1st title game, 2nd Fab Four)
- Runner-up: Concordia Nebraska Bulldogs (1st title game, 2nd Fab Four)
- Semifinalists: Cedarville Yellow Jackets (1st Fab Four); Oregon Tech Owls (3rd Fab Four)
- Charles Stevenson Hustle Award: Jason Jisa (Concordia Nebraska)
- Chuck Taylor MVP: Robert Whaley (Walsh)
- Top scorer: Robert Whaley (Walsh) (114 points)

The 2005 NAIA Division II men's basketball tournament was the tournament held by the NAIA to determine the national champion of men's college basketball among its Division II members in the United States and Canada for the 2004–05 basketball season.

Walsh defeated Concordia Nebraska in the championship game, 81–70, to claim the Cavaliers' first NAIA national title.

The tournament was played at Keeter Gymnasium on the campus of the College of the Ozarks in Point Lookout, Missouri.

== Qualification ==
The tournament field remained fixed at thirty-two teams, and the top sixteen teams were seeded.

The tournament continued to utilize a single-elimination format.

== Bracket ==
First round
1	William Jewell	84
Tennessee Wesleyan	57
Minot State	90
16	Cedarville	98**
9	Huntington (IN)	76
Newman	85
Saint Ambrose	74
8	Southern Oregon	85
5	Cornerstone	95
Friends (KS)	64
IU Southeast	59
12	Dominican California	61
13	Flagler	82
Albertson	70
Trinity Christian	69
4	Concordia Nebraska	74
3	Saint Vincent	89
Johnson & Wales Denver	75
College of the Ozarks	76
14	Indiana Tech	81
11	Taylor	66
MidAmerica Nazarene	71
Mayville State	60
6	Oregon Tech	67
7	Walsh	68
Tabor	62
Bluefield (VA)	66
10	Embry–Riddle (FL)	73
15	Bellevue (NE)	68
Western Baptist	65
Fisher (MA)	70
2	Northwestern (IA)	107

Second round
1	William Jewell	60
16	Cedarville	67
Newman	67
8	Southern Oregon	70
5	Cornerstone	76
12	Dominican California	62
13	Flagler	63
4	Concordia Nebraska	70
3	Saint Vincent	85
14	Indiana Tech	95*
MidAmerica Nazarene	48
6	Oregon Tech	58
7	Walsh	73
10	Embry–Riddle (FL)	71
15	Bellevue (NE)	69
2	Northwestern (IA)	72

Quarterfinals
16	Cedarville	66
8	Southern Oregon	64
5	Cornerstone	68
4	Concordia Nebraska	71
14	Indiana Tech	63
6	Oregon Tech	78
7	Walsh	68
2	Northwestern (IA)	61

Semifinals
16	Cedarville	56
4	Concordia Nebraska	62
6	Oregon Tech	70
7	Walsh	77

National championship
4	Concordia Nebraska	70
7	Walsh	81

== See also ==
- 2005 NAIA Division I men's basketball tournament
- 2005 NCAA Division I men's basketball tournament
- 2005 NCAA Division II men's basketball tournament
- 2005 NCAA Division III men's basketball tournament
- 2005 NAIA Division II women's basketball tournament
