= Herb Krautblatt =

American basketball player (1926–1999)

Personal information
- Born: November 19, 1926 Newark, New Jersey, U.S.
- Died: February 10, 1999 (aged 72)
- Listed height: 6 ft 1 in (1.85 m)
- Listed weight: 190 lb (86 kg)

Career information
- College: Rider (1944–1948)
- BAA draft: 1948: — round, —
- Drafted by: Baltimore Bullets
- Playing career: 1948–1951
- Position: Guard
- Number: 9

Career history
- 1948: Baltimore Bullets
- 1948–1949: Trenton Tigers
- 1949–1950: Hartford Hurricanes
- 1950–1951: Paterson Crescents

Career BAA statistics
- Points: 13 (1.3 ppg)
- Assists: 4 (0.4 apg)
- Stats at NBA.com
- Stats at Basketball Reference

Herbert Krautblatt (November 19, 1926 – February 10, 1999) was an American professional basketball player. Krautblatt was selected in the 1948 BAA Draft by the Baltimore Bullets. He played for the Bullets in 1948–49 before ending his Basketball Association of America career after just 10 games.

== BAA career statistics ==
Legend
GP	Games played
FG%	Field-goal percentage
FT%	Free-throw percentage
APG	Assists per game
PPG	Points per game

=== Regular season ===
Year	Team	GP	FG%	FT%	APG	PPG
1948–49	Baltimore	10	.222	.455	.4	1.3
Career		10	.222	.455	.4	1.3
