= 1961 NAIA basketball tournament =

College basketball tournament

1961 NAIA men's basketball tournament
- Season: 1960–61
- Teams: 32
- Finals site: Municipal Auditorium; Kansas City, Missouri
- Champions: Grambling Tigers (1st title, 1st title game, 1st Final Four)
- Runner-up: Georgetown Tigers (1st title game, 2nd Final Four)
- Semifinalists: Northern Michigan Wildcats (1st Final Four); Westminster Titans (2nd Final Four)
- Coach of the year: Rex Pyles (Alderson Broaddus)
- Charles Stevenson Hustle Award: Dick Vories (Georgetown (KY))
- MVP: Charles Hardnett (Grambling)

The 1961 NAIA men's basketball tournament was held in March at Municipal Auditorium in Kansas City, Missouri. The 24th annual NAIA basketball tournament featured 32 teams playing in a single-elimination format. The championship game featured the 13th seeded Grambling and the third seeded Georgetown. For the first time since seeding, in 1958, the third-place game featured the first and second seeds, Northern Michigan, and Westminster.

== Awards and honors ==
Many of the records set by the 1961 tournament have been broken, and many of the awards were established much later:

- Leading scorer: est. 1963
- Leading rebounder: est. 1963
- Player of the Year: est. 1994
- All-time leading scorer; first appearance: Willis Reed, 16th Grambling (1961,63,64), 12 games 108 field goals 39 free throws 265 total points, 22.8 average per
- All-time leading scorer; second appearance: Hershell West, 15th Grambling (1960,61,63), 13 games, 116 field goals, 37 free throws, 269 total points, 20.7 average per game.

== 1961 NAIA bracket ==
First round	Second round
1	Westminster (PA)	68
-	Arkansas State Teachers	60
1	Westminster (PA)	85
16	Newberry	73
-	Simpson	58
16	Newberry	64
TOP TIER
9	Winston-Salem State	95
-	Westminster (UT)	70
9	Winston-Salem State	86
-	West Virginia State	76
-	West Virginia State	90
8	Whitworth	89
5	Anderson (IN)	85
-	St. Bernard	77
5	Anderson (IN)	86
12	Emporia State	81*
-	Northern State	72
12	Emporia State	77
TOP TIER
13	Grambling	107
-	Linfield	85
13	Grambling	80
-	Peru State	60
-	Peru State	72
4	Oglethorpe	65
3	Georgetown (KY)	88
-	Western Montana	76
3	Georgetown (KY)	59
14	Redlands	57
-	Savannah State	80
14	Redlands	89
BOTTOM TIER
-	Gustavus Adolphus	63
10	Illinois Wesleyan	79
10	Illinois Wesleyan	62
7	Central State (OK)	84
7	Central State (OK)	80
-	St. Norbert	73
-	East Texas Baptist	70
6	Steubenville	68
-	East Texas Baptist	59
11	Southwest Texas State	61
11	Southwest Texas State	70
-	Central Connecticut State	59
BOTTOM TIER
15	Maryland State	74
-	Missouri Valley	89
-	Missouri Valley	63
2	Northern Michigan	79
-	Carson–Newman	60
2	Northern Michigan	69

Elite Eight
1	Westminster (PA)	35
9	Winston-Salem State	33
5	Anderson (IN)	54
13	Grambling	62
3	Georgetown (KY)	84
7	Central State (OK)	83
11	Southwest Texas State	75
2	Northern Michigan	80

NAIA national semifinals
1	Westminster (PA)	44
13	Grambling	45
3	Georgetown (KY)	101
2	Northern Michigan	67

NAIA national championship
13	Grambling	95
3	Georgetown (KY)	75

- * denotes overtime.

=== Third-place game ===
The third-place game featured the losing teams from the national semifinalist to determine third and fourth places in the tournament. This game was played until 1988.

NAIA third-place game
1	Westminster (PA)	84
2	Northern Michigan	101

== See also ==
- 1961 NCAA University Division basketball tournament
- 1961 NCAA College Division basketball tournament
