= 2005 NAIA Division I men's basketball tournament =

College basketball tournament

- Teams: 32
- Finals site: Municipal Auditorium, Kansas City, Missouri
- Champions: John Brown (1 title)
- Runner-up: Azusa Pacific (1 title game)
- Semifinalists: Carroll (MT) (1 Final Four); Robert Morris (IL) (1 Final Four)
- Coach of the year: Bill Odell (Azusa Pacific)
- Player of the year: Jarred Merrill (Oklahoma Christian)
- Charles Stevenson Hustle Award: Quinton Gibson (Robert Morris (IL))
- Chuck Taylor MVP: Brandon Cole (John Brown)
- Top scorer: Daniel Rose (Biola) (66 points)

The 2005 Buffalo Funds - NAIA Division I men's basketball tournament was held from March 16 to 22 at Municipal Auditorium in Kansas City, Missouri. The sixty-eighth annual NAIA basketball tournament featured 32 teams playing in a single-elimination format. The 2005 National Champions were the unranked John Brown University who defeated the 9th ranked Azusa Pacific University by a score of 65 to 55. The other NAIA National semifinalists were Carroll College (MT) and Robert Morris College (IL).

2005 tournament would bring four new teams to the NAIA national semifinals. The first tournament since 2001 tournament to do so. (It would be the 7th time in tournament history this has happened; previous years were the inaugural year 1937, 1945, 1947, 1965, 1969, 2001).

== Awards and honors ==
- Leading scorer: Daniel Rose, Biola in 3 games Rose scored a total of 66 points, including 26 field goals and 14 free throws to average 22.0 points per game.
- Leading rebounder: Mersad Terzic, Mountain State in 3 games Terzic earned 31 rebounds averaging 10.3 rebounds per game
- Most consecutive tournament appearances: 14th, Georgetown (KY)
- Most tournament appearances: Georgetown (KY), 24th of 28, appearances to the NAIA Tournament.

== Bracket ==
First round March 16 and 17	Second round March 18
1	Mountain State	77
–	Columbia (MO)	50
1	Mountain State	88
–	Trevecca Nazarene	65
–	Lewis–Clark State	71
16	Trevecca Nazarene	79
TOP TIER; March 16
9	Azusa Pacific	88
–	Houston Baptist	72
9	Azusa Pacific	100
8	Oklahoma Christian	93*
–	Brescia	63*
8	Oklahoma Christian	72
5	Georgetown (KY)	84
–	Georgia Southwestern State	62
5	Georgetown (KY)	87
–	Oklahoma Baptist	75
–	Oklahoma Baptist	75
12	Westminster (UT)	60
TOP TIER; March 16
13	Lubbock Christian	66
–	California Baptist	77
–	California Baptist	71
4	Robert Morris (IL)	105
–	Xavier (LA)	79
4	Robert Morris (IL)	81
3	Lindsey Wilson	69
–	Faulkner	63
3	Lindsey Wilson	68
14	St. Xavier	78
–	Langston	55
14	St. Xavier	72
BOTTOM TIER; March 17
11	Concordia (CA)	72
–	Carroll (MT)	85
–	Carroll (MT)	66
–	Oklahoma City	65
–	Oklahoma City	77
6	Mobile	74
7	Union (TN)	72
–	John Brown	84
–	John Brown	61
10	LSU–Shreveport	56
–	Cumberland (KY)	75*
10	LSU Shreveport	79
BOTTOM TIER; March 17
15	Missouri Baptist	70
–	Biola	76
–	Biola	65
2	Southern Poly	63
–	Voorhees	74
2	Southern Poly	88

Elite Eight; March 19
1	Mountain State	66
9	Azusa Pacific	82
5	Georgetown (KY)	87
4	Robert Morris (IL)	99
14	St. Xavier	57
–	Carroll	76
–	John Brown	58
–	Biola	56

NAIA national semifinals March 21
9	Azusa Pacific	96
4	Robert Morris (IL)	88
–	Carroll (MT)	60
–	John Brown	73

NAIA national championship March 22
9	Azusa Pacific	55
–	John Brown	65

* denotes overtime

== See also ==
- 2005 NAIA Division I women's basketball tournament
- 2005 NCAA Division I men's basketball tournament
- 2005 NCAA Division II men's basketball tournament
- 2005 NCAA Division III men's basketball tournament
- 2005 NAIA Division II men's basketball tournament
