= Taiwo Rafiu =

Nigerian basketball player

Taiwo Rafiu (born 18 June 1972 in Lagos State) is a Nigerian women's basketball player. She attended Oklahoma City University in the United States and with the Nigeria women's national basketball team at the 2004 Summer Olympics.
