= 2005 NAIA Division I women's basketball tournament =

- Teams: 32
- Finals site: Oman Arena, Jackson, Tennessee
- Champions: Union University Bulldogs (2nd title, 4th title game, 6th Fab Four)
- Runner-up: Oklahoma City Stars (8th title game, 8th Fab Four)
- Semifinalists: Houston Baptist Huskies (2nd Fab Four); Point Loma Nazarene (1st Fab Four)
- Coach of the year: Mark Campbell (Union (TN))
- Player of the year: Stephanie Clark and Lisa Faulkner (Union (TN), Vanguard)
- Charles Stevenson Hustle Award: Monica Elliot (Union (TN))
- Chuck Taylor MVP: Stephanie Clark (Union (TN))
- Top scorer: Kelly Schmidt (Vanguard) (84 points)

The 2005 NAIA Division I women's basketball tournament was the tournament held by the NAIA to determine the national champion of women's college basketball among its Division I members in the United States and Canada for the 2004–05 basketball season.

Union (TN), playing in its home town of Jackson, defeated Oklahoma City in the championship game, 67–63, to claim the Bulldogs' second NAIA national title and first since 1998.

The tournament was played at the Oman Arena in Jackson, Tennessee.

== Qualification ==
The tournament field remained fixed at thirty-two teams, which were sorted into one of four quadrants and seeded from 1 to 8 within each quadrant.

The tournament continued to utilize a simple single-elimination format.

== Bracket ==
First round
1	Vanguard	79
8	Edward Waters	44
5	Mobile	67
4	Carroll (MT)	72
3	North Georgia	64
6	Campbellsville	47
7	Lubbock Christian	55
2	Union (TN)	77
2	Point Loma Nazarene	73
7	Saint Xavier	54
6	Lee (TN)	55
3	Columbia (MO)	66
4	Oklahoma Christian	75
5	Montana Western	62
8	Texas Wesleyan	64
1	Freed–Hardeman	73
1	Oklahoma City	87
8	Lewis–Clark State	80
5	Azusa Pacific	93
4	Brewton–Parker	74
3	Trevecca Nazarene	71
6	Cumberlands (KY)	68
7	Loyola New Orleans	55
2	Southern Nazarene	86
2	The Master's	71
7	Oklahoma Baptist	65
6	McKendree	54
3	Georgetown (KY)	77
4	Xavier Louisiana	50
5	Cumberland (TN)	63
8	Indiana–South Bend	49
1	Houston Baptist	64

Second round
1	Vanguard	82
4	Carroll (MT)	71
3	North Georgia	75
2	Union (TN)	83
2	Point Loma Nazarene	88
3	Columbia (MO)	77
4	Oklahoma Christian	69
1	Freed–Hardeman	83
1	Oklahoma City	106
4	Brewton–Parker	58
3	Trevecca Nazarene	80
2	Southern Nazarene	64
2	The Master's	67
3	Georgetown (KY)	69
5	Cumberland (TN)	59
1	Houston Baptist	86

Elite Eight
1	Vanguard	72
2	Union (TN)	87
2	Point Loma Nazarene	59
1	Freed–Hardeman	42
1	Oklahoma City	71
3	Trevecca Nazarene	62
3	Georgetown (KY)	66
1	Houston Baptist	68

Final Four
2	Union (TN)	84
2	Point Loma Nazarene	58
1	Oklahoma City	81
1	Houston Baptist	74

National championship
2	Union (TN)	67
1	Oklahoma City	63

== See also ==
- 2005 NAIA Division I men's basketball tournament
- 2005 NCAA Division I women's basketball tournament
- 2005 NCAA Division II women's basketball tournament
- 2005 NCAA Division III women's basketball tournament
- 2005 NAIA Division II women's basketball tournament
