= 2001 NAIA Division I men's basketball tournament =

College basketball tournament

- Teams: 32
- Finals site: Tulsa Convention Center; Tulsa, Oklahoma
- Champions: Faulkner (1st title)
- Runner-up: USAO (1st title game)
- Semifinalists: Christian Heritage (1st Final Four); Pikeville (1st Final Four)
- Coach of the year: Jim Sanderson (Faulkner)
- Player of the year: Collier Mills (Transylvania)
- Charles Stevenson Hustle Award: Rich Reinebach (Christian Heritage)
- Chuck Taylor MVP: Paul Little (Faulkner)
- Top scorer: DuJuan Brown (Oklahoma Baptist) (78 points)

The 64th NAIA Division I men's basketball tournament was held in March at the Tulsa Convention Center in Tulsa, Oklahoma. It was the second tournament held in the Tulsa Convention Center and the last tournament to be held in Tulsa, Oklahoma. The 64th annual NAIA basketball tournament featured 32 teams playing in a single-elimination format. 2001 would bring four new teams to the NAIA national semifinals. The first tournament since 1969 tournament to do so. (It would be the 6th time in tournament history this has happened; previous years were the inaugural year 1937, 1945, 1947, 1965, 1969). It surpasses the 15 year gap between a fresh set of semi-finalist that was between 1947-1969. It would be the only time this would happen outside of Kansas City.

In the end, Faulkner University would win out over University of Science and Arts of Oklahoma, with a score of 63 to 59. The others rookies in the semifinals were Pikeville College and Christian Heritage (Calif.). USAO would eventually come back and win in 2002 national tournament.

== Awards and honors ==
- Leading scorer: DuJuan Brown, Oklahoma Baptist, in 3 games DuJuan scored 34 field goals, 8 FT, totaling 78 points, (avg 26.0/game)
- Leading rebounder: Randy Hughes, USAO in 5 games Randy grabbed 56 rebounds (avg 11.2/game)
- Most consecutive tournament appearances: 10th, Georgetown (KY)
- Most tournament appearances: Georgetown (KY), 20th of 28, appearances to the NAIA Tournament.

== 2001 NAIA bracket ==
First round	Second round
1	Transylvania	82
-	Trevecca Nazarene	68
1	Transylvania	67
16	Christian Heritage	77
16	Christian Heritage	73
-	Barber–Scotia	59
TOP TIER
-	Georgetown (KY)	95
9	Auburn Montgomery	85
-	Georgetown (KY)	91**
-	Lubbock Christian	92
-	Lubbock Christian	63
8	St. Xavier	62
5	Columbia (MO)	75
-	Union (TN)	66
5	Columbia (MO)	43
12	Spring Hill	69
12	Spring Hill	72
-	Life	63
TOP TIER
13	Biola	74
-	Westminster (UT)	53
13	Biola	72*
4	USAO	75
4	USAO	79
-	Cumberlands	64
3	Houston Baptist	66
-	Martin Methodist	67
-	Martin Methodist	72
14	Pikeville	82
-	Dillard	71
14	Pikeville	78
BOTTOM TIER
11	Carroll (MT)	69
-	Oklahoma Baptist	72
-	Oklahoma Baptist	82
-	Southern Tech	74
-	Southern Tech	86
6	College of West Virginia	59
7	Lee	92
-	Campbellsville	87
7	Lee	98
10	Faulkner	108
-	McKendree	76
10	Faulkner	78
BOTTOM TIER
15	Xavier (LA)	69
-	Oklahoma City	91
-	Oklahoma City	54
2	Azusa Pacific	94
-	Edward Waters	70
2	Azusa Pacific	82

Elite Eight
16	Christian Heritage	75
-	Lubbock Christian	61
12	Spring Hill	57
4	USAO	63
14	Pikeville	88
-	Oklahoma Baptist	83
10	Faulkner	79
2	Azusa Pacific	75

NAIA national semifinals
16	Christian Heritage	88
4	USAO	99
14	Pikeville	59
10	Faulkner	63

NAIA national championship
4	USAO	59
10	Faulkner	63

- * denotes each overtime.

== See also ==
- 2001 NAIA Division I women's basketball tournament
- 2001 NCAA Division I men's basketball tournament
- 2001 NCAA Division II men's basketball tournament
- 2001 NCAA Division III men's basketball tournament
- 2001 NAIA Division II men's basketball tournament
