= 2005 NCAA Division III women's basketball tournament =

- Teams: 50
- Finals site: Jane P. Batten Student Center, Virginia Beach, Virginia
- Champions: Millikin Big Blue (1st title)
- Runner-up: Randolph-Macon Yellow Jackets (1st title game)
- Third place: Southern Maine Huskies (4th Final Four)
- Fourth place: Scranton Royals (7th Final Four)
- Winning coach: Lori Kerans (1st title)
- MOP: Joanna Conner (Millikin)
- Attendance: 31,839

The 2005 NCAA Division III women's basketball tournament was the 24th annual tournament hosted by the NCAA to determine the national champion of Division III women's collegiate basketball in the United States.

Millikin defeated Randolph-Macon in the championship game, 70–50, to claim the Big Blue's first Division III national title.

The championship rounds were hosted by Virginia Wesleyan College from March 18–19 at the Jane P. Batten Student Center in Virginia Beach, Virginia.

== Bracket ==
=== Top left sectional ===
First round March 2, 2005; Campus sites
Salem State	41
Emmanuel (MA)	43
Ithaca*	64
Colby-Sawyer	46
Maine Maritime	67
Southern Maine*	83
Richard Stockton	60
Springfield*	64
Wesleyan (CT)*	64
Chestnut Hill	46

Second round March 5, 2005; Campus sites
Bates*	83
Emmanuel (GA)	64
Ithaca	52
Southern Maine*	55
Mount Saint Mary*	60
Springfield	66
Wesleyan (CT)	73
Staten Island*	64

Sectional semifinals March 11, 2005; Gorham, ME
Bates	64
Southern Maine	67
Springfield	62
Wesleyan (CT)	56

Sectional finals March 12, 2005; Gorham, ME
Southern Maine	80
Springfield	69

=== Bottom left sectional ===
First round March 2, 2005; Campus sites
Webster	35
Washington St. Louis*	62
Ripon*	62
Rockford	57
Edgewood	59
UW Stout	70
Franklin	60
Calvin*	74
Baldwin-Wallace*	46
Denison	51

Second round March 5, 2005; Campus sites
Millikin*	67
Washington St. Louis	58
Ripon	57
UW Stout*	65
DePauw*	63
Calvin	72
Denison	44
Albion*	63

Sectional semifinals March 11, 2005; Grand Rapids, MI
Millikin	59
UW Stout	56
Calvin	64
Albion	56

Sectional finals March 12, 2005; Grand Rapids, MI
Millikin	63
Calvin	56

=== Top right sectional ===
First round March 2, 2005; Campus sites
Frostburg State	64
McDaniel*	71
Dickinson*	50
Westminster (PA)	54
Washington & Jefferson	54
William Smith*	68
Brockport State	38
Alvernia*	60

Second round March 5, 2005; Campus sites
Scranton*	72
McDaniel	69
Westminster (PA)	46
Messiah	69
Oswego State*	58
William Smith	68
Alvernia	46
Bowdoin*	69

Sectional semifinals March 11, 2005; Scranton, PA
Scranton	64
Messiah	43
William Smith	51
Bowdoin	63

Sectional finals March 12, 2005; Scranton, PA
Scranton	49
Bowdoin	43

=== Bottom right sectional ===
First round March 2, 2005; Campus sites
Simpson	63
Saint Benedict*	80
Chapman*	72
Cal Lutheran	65
Mary Washington	69
Maryville (TN)*	66
Howard Payne*	55
Trinity (TX)	57

Second round March 5, 2005; Campus sites
Buena Vista*	71
Saint Benedict	77
Chapman	55
George Fox*	86
Randolph-Macon*	89
Mary Washington	76
Trinity (TX)*	79
Greensboro	64

Sectional semifinals March 11, 2005; Ashland, VA
Saint Benedict	69
George Fox	74
Randolph-Macon	82
Trinity (TX)	79

Sectional finals March 12, 2005; Ashland, VA
George Fox	51
Randolph-Macon	63

=== Final Four ===
Final Four; March 18, 2005
Southern Maine	60
Millikin	66
Scranton	65
Randolph-Macon	70

National championship March 19, 2005
Millikin	70
Randolph-Macon	50
Third place
Southern Maine	55
Scranton	53

== All-tournament team ==
- Joanna Conner, Millikin
- Audrey Minott, Millikin
- Lindsay Ippel, Millikin
- Megan Silva, Randolph-Macon
- Megan Myles, Southern Maine

== See also ==
- 2005 NCAA Division I women's basketball tournament
- 2005 NCAA Division II women's basketball tournament
- 2005 NAIA Division I women's basketball tournament
- 2005 NAIA Division II women's basketball tournament
- 2005 NCAA Division III men's basketball tournament
