= Hal Tidrick =

American basketball player

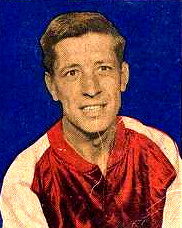
- Tidrick in 1948

Personal information
- Born: August 4, 1915 Ohio, U.S.
- Died: April 2, 1974 (aged 58)
- Listed height: 6 ft 1 in (1.85 m)
- Listed weight: 190 lb (86 kg)

Career information
- High school: Martins Ferry (Martins Ferry, Ohio)
- College: Washington & Jefferson (1938–1941)
- Playing career: 1945–1949
- Position: Forward / guard
- Number: 20, 4

Career history
- 1945: Sheboygan Red Skins
- 1946–1948: Toledo Jeeps
- 1948–1949: Indianapolis Jets
- 1948–1949: Baltimore Bullets
- 1951–1952: Washington Capitols

Career highlights
- All-NBL Second Team (1947)

Career statistics
- Points: 552
- Assists: 101
- Stats at NBA.com
- Stats at Basketball Reference

Howard Benjamin "Hal" Tidrick (August 4, 1915 – April 2, 1974) was an American professional basketball player. He played for the Indianapolis Jets and the Baltimore Bullets of the Basketball Association of America (BAA). He attended college at Washington & Jefferson College.

== BAA career statistics ==
Legend
GP	Games played	FG%	Field-goal percentage
FT%	Free-throw percentage	APG	Assists per game
PPG	Points per game	**Bold**	Career high

=== Regular season ===
Year	Team	GP	FG%	FT%	APG	PPG
1948–49	Indianapolis	8	.179	.778	1.4	4.8
1948–49	Baltimore	**53**	**.332**	**.802**	**1.7**	**9.7**
Career		61	.315	.800	1.7	9.0

=== Playoffs ===
Year	Team	GP	FG%	FT%	APG	PPG
1948–49	Baltimore	3	.263	.600	.3	4.3
Career		3	.263	.600	.3	4.3
