= 1965 NAIA basketball tournament =

College basketball tournament

1965 NAIA men's basketball tournament
- Season: 1964–65
- Teams: 32
- Finals site: Municipal Auditorium; Kansas City, Missouri
- Champions: Central State (Ohio) (1st title, 1st title game, 1st Final Four)
- Runner-up: Oklahoma Baptist (1st title game, 1st Final Four)
- Semifinalists: Ouachita Baptist (Ark.) (1st Final Four); Fairmont State (W.Va.) (1st Final Four)
- Coach of the year: Dick Campbell (Carson-Newman (Tenn.))
- Charles Stevenson Hustle Award: David Kossover (Ouachita Baptist (Ark.))
- MVP: Ken Wilburn (Central State (Ohio))
- Top scorer: Al Tucker (Oklahoma Baptist) (125 points)

The 1965 NAIA men's basketball tournament was held in March at Municipal Auditorium in Kansas City, Missouri. The 28th annual NAIA basketball tournament featured 32 teams playing in a single-elimination format. This is the first tournament since 1947 tournament to feature four new teams to the NAIA Semifinals. (It would be the 4th time since 1937 this has happened; previous years were the inaugural year 1937, 1945, and 1947). It was the longest gap up until it was eclipsed by the gap between 1969-2001 which featured 1 or more repeating semi-finalist each year. It was the second time the number one seed has won the tournament.

== Awards and honors ==
- Leading scorer: Al Tucker, Oklahoma Baptist; 5 games, 43 field goals, 39 free throws, 125 total points (25.0 average points per game)
- Leading rebounder: Ken Wilburn, Central State (Ohio); 5 games, 90 total rebounds (18.0 average rebounds per game)
- Player of the Year: est. 1994
- All-time leading scorer; first appearance: Al Tucker 2nd, Oklahoma Baptist (1965,66,67); 15 games, 177 field goals, 117 free throws, 471 total points (31.4 points per game).

== 1965 NAIA bracket ==
First round	Second round
1	Central State (Ohio)	78
-	Jacksonville (Fla.)	57
1	Central State (Ohio)	75
16	Midwestern	61
-	Valley City State (N.D.)	57
16	Midwestern (Texas)	102
TOP TIER
9	Augsburg College (Minn.)	107
-	Central Connecticut State	87
9	Augsburg	66
8	Hastings	65
-	Northern Michigan	89*
8	Hastings College (Neb.)	95
5	St. Benedict's (Kan.)	75
-	Maryland State	73
5	St. Benedict's	101
-	Albany State	74
-	Albany State (Ga.)	74
12	Transylvania (Ky.)	57
TOP TIER
13	Alliance College (Pa.)	86
-	Stephen F. Austin (Texas)	61
13	Alliance	69
-	Fairmont State	83
-	Fairmont State (W. Va.)	94
4	Upper Iowa	90
3	Southern-Baton Rouge (La.)	94
-	Indiana Tech	77
3	Southern	97
-	Eastern Montana	86
-	Eastern Montana	63
14	Central Washington State	61
BOTTOM TIER
-	Ouachita Baptist (Ark.)	83
10	Lincoln (Mo.)	76
-	Ouachita Baptist	77
-	Lewis	61
7	Mansfield State (Pa.)	74
-	Lewis (Ill.)	90
-	California Western	57
6	High Point (N.C.)	79
6	High Point	62
11	Winston-Salem State	78
11	Winston-Salem State (N.C.)	87
-	St. Norbert (Wis.)	69
BOTTOM TIER
15	Oklahoma Baptist	87
-	Linfield (Ore.)	84
15	Oklahoma Baptist	95
2	Southwestern Louisiana	82
-	Southern Colorado State	59
2	Southwestern Louisiana	66

Elite Eight
1	Central State (Ohio)	66
9	Augsburg	57
5	St. Benedict's	87
-	Fairmont State	103
3	Southern	64
-	Ouachita Baptist	65
11	Winston-Salem State	62
15	Oklahoma Baptist	71

NAIA national semifinals
1	Central State (Ohio)	91
-	Fairmont State	75
-	Ouachita Baptist	53
15	Oklahoma Baptist	66

NAIA national championship
1	Central State (Ohio)	85
15	Oklahoma Baptist	51

- * denotes overtime.

=== Third-place game ===
The third-place game featured the losing teams from the national semifinalist to determine 3rd and 4th places in the tournament. This game was played until 1988.

NAIA third-place game
-	Fairmont State	71
-	Ouachita Baptist	78

== See also ==
- 1965 NCAA University Division basketball tournament
- 1965 NCAA College Division basketball tournament
