= 1969 NAIA basketball tournament =

College basketball tournament

1969 NAIA men's basketball tournament
- Season: 1968–69
- Teams: 32
- Finals site: Municipal Auditorium; Kansas City, Missouri
- Champions: Eastern New Mexico (1st title, 1st title game, 1st Final Four)
- Runner-up: Maryland State (1st title game, 1st Final Four)
- Semifinalists: Central Washington (1st Final Four); Elizabeth City (1st Final Four)
- Coach of the year: Joe Retton (Fairmont State (W.Va.))
- Charles Stevenson Hustle Award: Larry Vanzant (Eastern New Mexico)
- MVP: Jake Ford (Maryland State)
- Top scorer: Jake Ford (Maryland State) (156 points)

The 1969 NAIA men's basketball tournament was held in March at Municipal Auditorium in Kansas City, Missouri. The 32nd annual NAIA basketball tournament featured 32 teams playing in a single-elimination format. This is the first tournament since 1965 tournament to feature four new teams to the NAIA Semifinals. (It would be the 5th time since 1937 this has happened; previous years were the inaugural year 1937, 1945, 1947, 1965.) This would not happen again until 2001.

== Awards and honors ==
- Leading scorer: Jake Ford, Maryland State; 5 games, 52 field goals, 52 free throws, 156 total points (31.2 average points per game)
- Leading rebounder: Bruce Sanderson, Central Washington; 5 games, 65 total rebounds (13.0 average rebounds per game)
- Player of the Year: est. 1994
- Most tournament appearances: Georgetown (Ky.), 8th of 28, appearances to the NAIA Tournament

== 1969 NAIA bracket ==
First round | Second round
1 | Fairmont State (W.Va.) | 93
- | Indiana Central | 75
1 | Fairmont State | 72
16 | Washburn | 74
- | Western Montana | 68
16 | Washburn (Kan.) | 90
TOP TIER
9 | Elizabeth City (N.C.) | 86
- | Valdosta State (Ga.) | 78
9 | Elizabeth City | 88
8 | Southwestern Oklahoma | 81
- | Yankton (S.D.) | 91
8 | Southwestern Oklahoma State | 100
5 | Eastern Michigan | 87
- | Georgetown (Ky.) | 85
5 | Eastern Michigan | 69
12 | Eastern New Mexico | 77
- | Millikin (Ill.) | 71
12 | Eastern New Mexico | 89
TOP TIER
13 | Whittier (Calif.) | 77
- | Corpus Christi (Tex.) | 66
13 | Whittier | 82
4 | High Point | 100
- | Missouri-St. Louis | 90
4 | High Point (N.C.) | 102
3 | Central State (Ohio) | 59
- | Monmouth (N.J.) | 63
Monmouth | 115
- | Asheville-Biltmore | 81
- | Asheville-Biltmore (N.C.) | 86
14 | Grambling State (La.) | 74
BOTTOM TIER
10 | Linfield (Ore.) | 80
- | Stout State (Wis.) | 113
- | Wisconsin-Stout | 83
- | Maryland State | 85
- | Maryland State | 99
7 | Wartburg (Iowa) | 90
6 | Gannon (Pa.) | 81
- | Jackson State (Miss.) | 58
6 | Gannon | 78
11 | Henderson State | 80
- | St. John's (Minn.) | 76
11 | Henderson State (Ark.) | 78
BOTTOM TIER
15 | Central Washington State | 92
- | New Haven (Conn.) | 82
15 | Central Washington | 96
2 | Howard Payne | 74
- | Wayne State (Neb.) | 70
2 | Howard Payne (Tex.) | 94

Elite Eight
16 | Washburn | 88
9 | Elizabeth City | 90
12 | Eastern New Mexico | 77
- | High Point | 73
Monmouth | 94
- | Maryland State | 99
11 | Henderson State | 64
15 | Central Washington | 96

NAIA national semifinals
9 | Elizabeth City | 72
12 | Eastern New Mexico | 75
- | Maryland State | 93
15 | Central Washington | 87

NAIA national championship
12 | Eastern New Mexico | 99
- | Maryland State | 76

=== Third-place game ===
The third-place game featured the losing teams from the national semifinalist to determine 3rd and 4th places in the tournament. This game was played until 1988.

| NAIA third-place game |
| 9 | Elizabeth City | 82 |
| 15 | Central Washington | 96 |

== See also ==
- 1969 NCAA University Division basketball tournament
- 1969 NCAA College Division basketball tournament
