= 2005 NCAA Division II men's basketball tournament =

Basketball tournament

- Teams: 64
- Finals site: Ralph Engelstad Arena, Grand Forks, North Dakota
- Champions: Virginia Union Panthers (3rd title)
- Runner-up: Bryant Bulldogs (1st title game)
- Semifinalists: Lynn Fighting Knights (2nd Final Four); Tarleton State Texans (1st Final Four)
- Winning coach: Dave Robbins (3rd title)
- MOP: Antwan Walton (Virginia Union)
- Attendance: 32,938

The 2005 NCAA Division II men's basketball tournament involved 64 schools playing in a single-elimination tournament to determine the national champion of men's NCAA Division II college basketball as the culmination of the 2004–05 NCAA Division II men's basketball season. It was won by Virginia Union University and VUU's Antwan Walton was the Most Outstanding Player. The Elite Eight, national semifinals, and championship were played at Ralph Engelstad Arena in Grand Forks, North Dakota.

2005 NCAA Division II Men's sites - regionals (cyan) Elite Eight (red)

== Regionals ==
=== Northeast – Waltham, Massachusetts ===
Location: Dana Center Host: Bentley College

First round Round of 64; March 12
1	Bentley	85
8	Queens (NY)	68
4	Southern New Hampshire	80
5	St. Rose	71
6	Bryant	69
3	Adelphi	48
7	Bloomfield	79
2	St. Anselm	77

Regional semifinal Round of 32; March 13
1	Bentley	90
4	Southern New Hampshire	84
6	Bryant	76
7	Bloomfield	59

Regional Final; Sweet 16; March 15
1	Bentley	64
6	Bryant	74

=== East - Misenheimer, North Carolina ===
Location: Merner Gym Host: Pfeiffer University

First round Round of 64; March 12
1	Pfeiffer	110
8	Wheeling Jesuit	94
4	Salem International	72
5	Alderson Broaddus	61
6	Indiana (PA)	76
3	Edinboro	73
2	Mount Olive	86
7	Millersville	78

Regional semifinal Round of 32; March 13
1	Pfeiffer	92
4	Salem International	105
6	Indiana (PA)	64
2	Mount Olive	72

Regional Final; Sweet 16; March 15
4	Salem International	73
2	Mount Olive	80

=== South Central - Commerce, Texas ===
Location: Texas A&M-Commerce Field House Host: Texas A&M University-Commerce

First round Round of 64; March 12
1	Texas A&M–Commerce	62
8	Southwestern Oklahoma	57
5	Central Oklahoma	84
4	Washburn	66
3	Pittsburg State	73
6	St. Mary's (TX)	59
7	Tarleton State	75
2	Central Missouri	72

Regional semifinal Round of 32; March 13
1	Texas A&M–Commerce	81
5	Central Oklahoma	73
3	Pittsburg State	59
7	Tarleton State	65

Regional Final; Sweet 16; March 15
1	Texas A&M–Commerce	70
7	Tarleton State	75

=== West - Bellingham, Washington ===
Location: Haggen Court at Sam Carver Gymnasium Host: Western Washington University

First round Round of 64; March 11
1	Western Washington	80
8	BYU–Hawaii	69
5	Alaska–Fairbanks	65
4	Cal State San Bernardino	59
3	Cal Poly Pomona	82
6	Seattle Pacific	77
2	Hawaii–Hilo	83
7	Chico State	81

Regional semifinal Round of 32; March 12
1	Western Washington	66
5	Alaska–Fairbanks	88
3	Cal Poly Pomona	73
2	Hawaii–Hilo	62

Regional Final; Sweet 16; March 14
5	Alaska–Fairbanks	75
3	Cal Poly Pomona	86

=== South - Boca Raton, Florida ===
Location: Count and Countess de Hoernle Sports and Cultural Center Host: Lynn University

First round Round of 64; March 12
1	Lynn	89
8	Lane	61
5	Central Arkansas	74
4	West Georgia	71
6	Eckerd	81
3	FGCU	79
2	Montevallo	74
7	Barry	48

Regional semifinal Round of 32; March 13
1	Lynn	73
5	Central Arkansas	69
6	Eckerd	62
2	Montevallo	65

Regional Final; Sweet 16; March 15
1	Lynn	67
2	Montevallo	54

=== Great Lakes - Findlay, Ohio ===
Location: Houdeshell Court at Croy Gymnasium Host: University of Findlay

First round Round of 64; March 12
1	Findlay	83
8	Quincy	73
5	Wayne State (MI)	56
4	SIUE	55
3	Ferris State	99
6	Indianapolis	79
2	Southern Indiana	67
7	Gannon	61

Regional semifinal Round of 32; March 13
1	Findlay	63
5	Wayne State	49
3	Ferris State	93
2	Southern Indiana	87

Regional Final; Sweet 16; March 15
1	Findlay	94
3	Ferris State	73

=== North Central - Denver, Colorado ===
Location: Auraria Events Center Host: Metropolitan State University

First round Round of 64; March 12
1	Metro State	83
8	Northern State	60
4	Minnesota State–Mankato	86
5	Fort Lewis	78
3	South Dakota	94
6	Nebraska–Kearney	84
7	Winona State	64
2	Nebraska–Omaha	58

Regional semifinal Round of 32; March 13
1	Metro State	85
4	Minnesota State–Mankato	64
3	South Dakota	73
7	Winona State	68

Regional Final; Sweet 16; March 15
1	Metro State	89
3	South Dakota	84

=== South Atlantic - Bowie, Maryland ===
Location: A.C. Jordan Arena Host: Bowie State University

First round Round of 64; March 12
1	Bowie State	84
8	Tusculum	72
5	Columbus State	83
4	Kennesaw State	78
3	South Carolina Upstate	63
6	Winston-Salem State	59
2	Virginia Union	85
7	Catawba	81

Regional semifinal Round of 32; March 13
1	Bowie State	84
5	Columbus State	72
3	South Carolina Upstate	67
2	Virginia Union	85

Regional Final; Sweet 16; March 15
1	Bowie State	64
2	Virginia Union	70

== Elite Eight – Grand Forks, North Dakota ==
Location: Ralph Engelstad Arena Host: University of North Dakota

National Quarterfinals; Elite Eight; March 23
Bryant	84
Mount Olive	69
Tarleton State	58
Cal Poly Pomona	56
Lynn	75
Findlay	56
Virginia Union	78
Metro State	63

National semifinals Final Four; March 24
Bryant	60
Tarleton State	55
Lynn	61
Virginia Union	76

National Championship; March 26
Bryant	58
Virginia Union	63

== All-tournament team ==
- Chris Burns (Bryant)
- Duan Crockett (Virginia Union)
- Luqman Jabaar (Virginia Union)
- John Williams (Bryant)
- Antwan Walton (Virginia Union)

== See also ==
- 2005 NCAA Division II women's basketball tournament
- 2005 NCAA Division I men's basketball tournament
- 2005 NCAA Division III men's basketball tournament
- 2005 NAIA Division I men's basketball tournament
- 2005 NAIA Division II men's basketball tournament
