= 2005 NCAA Division III men's basketball tournament =

American collegiate men's basketball tournament (2005)

- Teams: 48
- Finals site: , Salem, Virginia
- Champions: Wisconsin–Stevens Point (2nd title)
- Runner-up: Rochester (3rd title game)
- Semifinalists: Calvin (4th Final Four); York (PA) (1st Final Four)
- Winning coach: Jack Bennett (UWSP)
- MOP: Jason Kalsow (UWSP)
- Attendance: 47,640

The 2005 NCAA Division III men's basketball tournament was the 31st annual single-elimination tournament to determine the national champions of National Collegiate Athletic Association (NCAA) men's Division III collegiate basketball in the United States.

The field contained forty-eight teams, and each program was allocated to one of four sectionals. All sectional games were played on campus sites, while the national semifinals, third-place final, and championship finals were contested at the Salem Civic Center in Salem, Virginia.

Defending champions Wisconsin–Stevens Point defeated Rochester (NY), 73–49, in the championship, clinching their first national title. Stevens Point were the first men's Division III program to defend their national title since Wisconsin–Platteville in 1999.

The Pointers (29–3) were again coached by Jack Bennett.

Jason Kalsow, also from Stevens Point, was named Most Outstanding Player.

== Bracket ==
=== Top left sectional ===
First round
Hanover	69
Blackburn	49
Trinity (TX)	72
Texas–Dallas	66
Buena Vista	91
Edgewood	74
Gustavus Adolphus	56
Lawrence	70

Second round
Illinois Wesleyan	76
Hanover	81
Trinity (TX)	65
Pomona–Pitzer	53
Puget Sound	85
Buena Vista	82
Lawrence	45
UW–Stevens Point	79

Sectional semifinals
Hanover	65
Trinity (TX)	73
Puget Sound	63
UW–Stevens Point	81

Sectional finals
Trinity (TX)	55
UW–Stevens Point	61

=== Bottom left sectional ===
First round
Ursinus	66
City Tech	68
Albright	94
Mount St. Mary (NY)	84
Western Connecticut	73
Endicott	62
Virginia Wesleyan	76
New Jersey City	57

Second round
Ramapo	105
City Tech	60
Albright	55
King's (PA)	57
WPI	79
Western Connecticut	77
Virginia Wesleyan	80
York (PA)	90

Sectional semifinals
Ramapo	78
King's (PA)	85
WPI	80
York (PA)	99

Sectional finals
King's (PA)	58
York (PA)	70

=== Top right sectional ===
First round
Springfield	71
Norwich	56
Gwynedd–Mercy	70
Union (NY)	84
Salem State	74
Elms	71
Lebanon Valley	71
Penn State Behrend	53

Second round
Amherst	81
Springfield	68
Union (NY)	61
Rochester	79
Potsdam State	74*
Salem State	73
Lebanon Valley	58
St. John Fisher	66

Sectional semifinals
Amherst	62
Rochester	69
Potsdam State	67
St. John Fisher	43

Sectional finals
Rochester	67
Potsdam State	51

=== Bottom right sectional ===
First round
John Carroll	76
Bethany (WV)	48
Wooster	94
Baldwin Wallace	78
Wheaton (IL)	74
Calvin	75
Maryville (TN)	79
Methodist	64

Second round
Wittenberg	68
John Carroll	75**
Wooster	58
Albion	59
Aurora	59
Calvin	71
Maryville (TN)	62
Mississippi College	68

Sectional semifinals
John Carroll	79
Albion	80
Calvin	79
Mississippi College	60

Sectional finals
Albion	52
Calvin	60

=== Final Four ===
- Site: Salem Civic Center, Salem, Virginia

National semifinals
UW–Stevens Point	81
York (PA)	58
Rochester	65
Calvin	62

National championship
UW–Stevens Point	73
Rochester	49
National third-place
York (PA)	84
Calvin	98

== See also ==
- 2005 NCAA Division I men's basketball tournament
- 2005 NCAA Division II men's basketball tournament
- 2005 NCAA Division III women's basketball tournament
- 2005 NAIA Division I men's basketball tournament
