= 1945 NAIA basketball tournament =

College basketball tournament

1945 NAIA men's basketball tournament
- Teams: 16
- Finals site: Municipal Auditorium; Kansas City, Missouri
- Champions: Loyola New Orleans (1st title, 1st title game, 1st Final Four)
- Runner-up: Pepperdine (1st title game, 1st Final Four)
- Semifinalists: Eastern Kentucky (1st Final Four); Southern Illinois (1st Final Four)
- MVP: Fred Lewis (Eastern Kentucky)

The 1945 NAIA basketball tournament was held in March at Municipal Auditorium in Kansas City, Missouri. The 8th annual NAIA basketball tournament featured 16 teams playing in a single-elimination format, instead of the normal 32. It is the only tournament to feature only 16 teams.

The NAIA semifinals featured four new teams for the first time since the inaugural year, 1937.

The championship game featured Loyola New Orleans defeating Pepperdine 49–35. Loyola New Orleans would not go on to win another NAIA national title until 2022, 77 years later.

== Awards and honors ==
Many of the records set by the 1945 tournament have been broken, and many of the awards were established much later:

- Leading scorer est. 1963
- Leading rebounder est. 1963
- Charles Stevenson Hustle Award est. 1958
- Coach of the Year est. 1954
- Player of the Year est. 1994

== Bracket ==
First round	Elite Eight
Central (MO)	54
Eau Claire	36
Central (MO)	48*
Eastern Kentucky	50
Eastern Kentucky	64
Simpson	42
TOP TIER
West Texas State	54
Wichita State	43
West Texas State	45
Pepperdine	52
Pepperdine	77
Peru State	42
Central Normal (IN)	53
Catawba	39
Central Normal	43
Loyola New Orleans	50
Loyola New Orleans	53
Phillips	31
BOTTOM TIER
Southern Illinois	64
Washburn	49
Southern Illinois	61
Doane	44
Doane	54
Eastern Washington State	51

NAIA national semifinals
Eastern Kentucky	34
Pepperdine	52
Loyola New Orleans	37
Southern Illinois	35

NAIA national championship
Pepperdine	35
Loyola New Orleans	49
NAIA third-pace game
Eastern Kentucky	45
Southern Illinois	49

- * denotes overtime.

== See also ==
- 1945 NCAA basketball tournament
- 1945 National Invitation Tournament
